= Kaeden Kent =

American baseball player (born 2003)

San Francisco Giants
- Infielder
- Born: August 29, 2003 (age 23); Austin, Texas, U.S.
- Bats: Left Throws: Right
- Stats at Baseball Reference

Kaeden Thomas Kent (born August 29, 2003) is an American professional baseball infielder in the San Francisco Giants organization. He was drafted by the New York Yankees in the third round of the 2025 MLB draft.

== Amateur career ==
Kent attended Lake Travis High School in Austin, Texas, where he played baseball. He committed to play college baseball at Texas A&M University for the Aggies in 2022.

In 2023, his freshman year at Texas A&M, Kent appeared in 28 games, batting .265 with one home run. In 2024, the Aggies were invited to the NCAA tournament as Kent batted .327 with four home runs in 51 games. In the second game of the Bryan-College Station Super Regional against Oregon, he hit a grand slam as part of a nine-run outburst to bring the Aggies to the lead, clinching a spot in the 2024 Men's College World Series. Texas A&M would advance to the final round before losing to Tennessee in three games. Kent was named to the CWS All-Tournament Team as a designated hitter. In his junior year, he batted .279 with a career high of 13 home runs and 49 RBIs.

During his time at Texas A&M, he played in the Cape Cod Baseball League for the Chatham Anglers and the Brewster Whitecaps.

== Professional career ==
=== New York Yankees ===
The New York Yankees selected Kent with the 103rd overall pick in the third round of the 2025 Major League Baseball draft. He signed a contract worth $744,400 with the Yankees, his full slot value.

Kent made his professional debut with the High-A Hudson Valley Renegades in 2025. He hit his first professional home run on September 13, 2025, in a game against the Aberdeen IronBirds. He finished the 2025 season batting .186/.217/.265 with two home runs and 17 RBI. Kent started the 2026 season with Hudson Valley, batting .302/.359/.433 with six home runs and 43 RBI, as well as 20 stolen bases.

=== San Francisco Giants ===
On August 3, 2026, the Yankees traded Kent and Henry Lalane to the San Francisco Giants in exchange for Heliot Ramos.

== Personal life ==
Kent is the son of Hall of Fame player Jeff Kent, the youngest of four children. His brother, Colton, also played college baseball for Brigham Young University and the College of Southern Idaho.
