= Caleb Kilian =

American baseball player (born 1997)

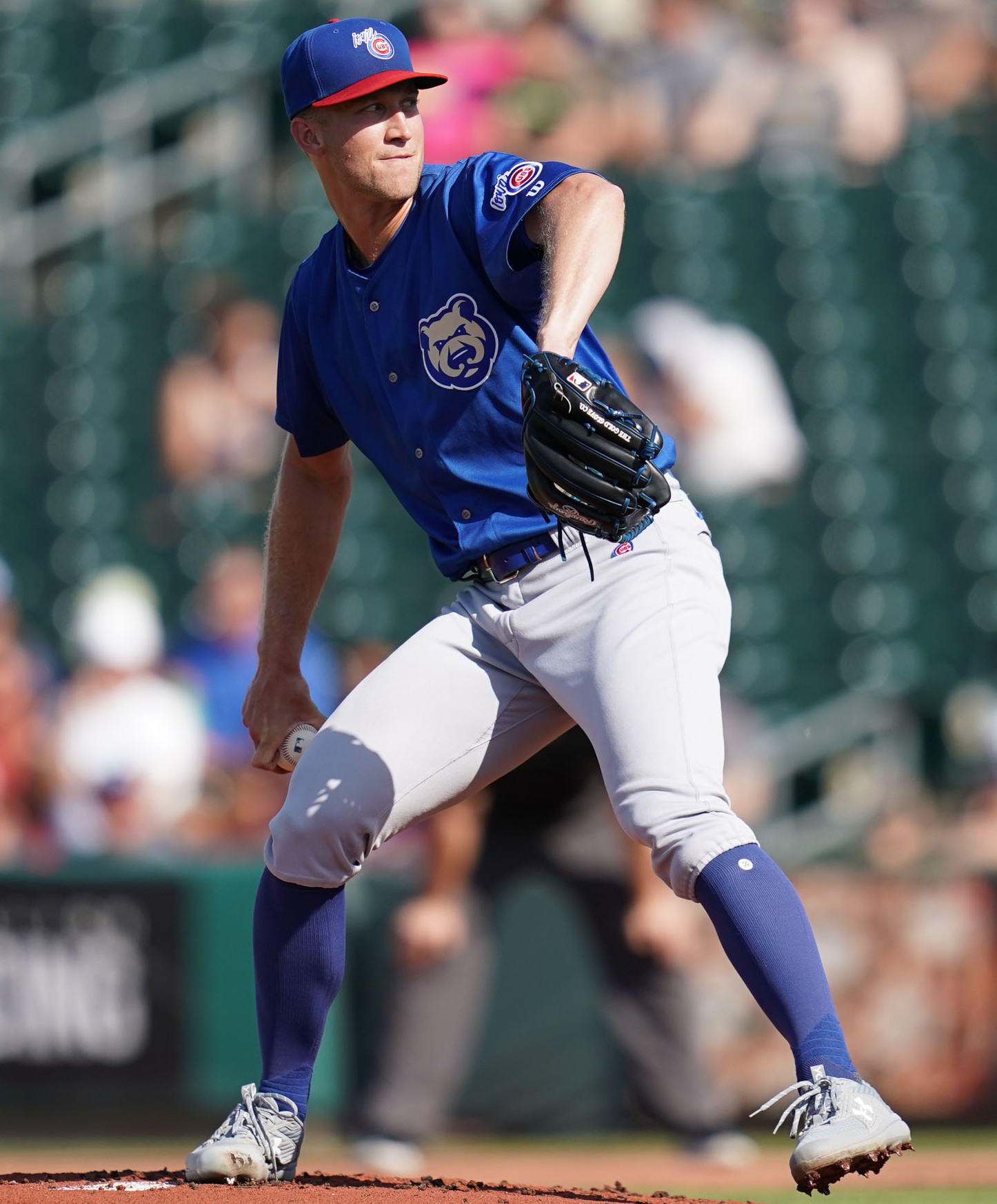
- Kilian with the Iowa Cubs in 2022

Philadelphia Phillies – No. 56
- Pitcher
- Born: June 2, 1997 (age 29); Anaheim, California, U.S.
- Bats: Right Throws: Right

MLB debut
- June 4, 2022, for the Chicago Cubs

MLB statistics (through 2026 season)
- Win–loss record: 4–11
- Earned-run average: 6.48
- Strikeouts: 77
- Stats at Baseball Reference

Teams
- Chicago Cubs (2022–2024); San Francisco Giants (2026); Philadelphia Phillies (2026–present)

Caleb John Kilian (born June 2, 1997) is an American professional baseball pitcher for the Philadelphia Phillies of Major League Baseball (MLB). He has previously played in MLB for the Chicago Cubs and San Francisco Giants.

== Amateur career ==
Kilian attended Flower Mound High School in Flower Mound, Texas, and Texas Tech University, where he played college baseball for the Texas Tech Red Raiders. He was drafted by the Baltimore Orioles in the 20th round of the 2018 Major League Baseball draft but did not sign and returned to Texas Tech. He was then drafted by the San Francisco Giants in the eighth round of the 2019 Major League Baseball draft and signed.

== Professional career ==
=== San Francisco Giants ===
Kilian spent his first professional season in 2019 with the rookie–level Arizona League Giants and Low–A Salem-Keizer Volcanoes and did not allow an earned run over 16 innings. He did not play in a game in 2020 due to the cancellation of the minor league season because of the COVID-19 pandemic. Kilian started 2021 with the High–A Eugene Emeralds before being promoted to the Double–A Richmond Flying Squirrels.

=== Chicago Cubs ===
On July 30, 2021, the San Francisco Giants traded Kilian and Alexander Canario to the Chicago Cubs for Kris Bryant. He was assigned to play for the Tennessee Smokies, but missed the final month of the 2021 season due to injury. Over 19 starts between Eugene, Richmond, and Tennessee, he went 7-4 with a 2.42 ERA and 112 strikeouts over 100 1/3 innings. After the season, Kilian played for the Mesa Solar Sox in the Arizona Fall League. He won the AFL Championship Game's MVP Award after throwing six perfect innings, retiring all 18 batters he faced. He opened the 2022 season with the Iowa Cubs.

On June 4, 2022, Kilian was selected to the 40-man roster and promoted to the major leagues for the first time to start against the St. Louis Cardinals. He made 3 starts for Chicago in his rookie campaign, struggling to an 0-2 record and 10.32 ERA with 9 strikeouts in 11 1/3 innings pitched.

Kilian was optioned to Triple-A Iowa to begin the 2023 season. He made three appearances for the big–league club, struggling to a 16.88 ERA with 5 strikeouts across 5 1/3 innings of work.

During spring training in 2024, Kilian strained his teres major muscle and missed the first months of the season. He was activated from the injured list on July 31. In 2 games (1 start) for the Cubs, Kilian posted an 0-1 record and 4.22 ERA with 7 strikeouts across 10 2/3 innings pitched.

Kilian was optioned to Triple-A Iowa to begin the 2025 season. After one start for Iowa, Kilian was designated for assignment by Chicago on April 10, 2025. He was released by the Cubs organization on April 13. Kilian re-signed with Chicago on a minor league contract on April 16. He made 11 appearances (one start) for South Bend and Iowa, accumulating a 1-1 record and 7.47 ERA with 14 strikeouts across 15 2/3 innings pitched. Kilian elected free agency following the season on November 6.

=== San Francisco Giants (second stint) ===
On December 14, 2025, Kilian signed a minor league contract with the San Francisco Giants. On March 25, 2026, the Giants selected Kilian's contract after he made the team's Opening Day roster. On April 18, Kilian recorded his first career win after tossing two scoreless innings of relief against the Washington Nationals. On May 4, he recorded his first career save, allowing one run on one hit with two strikeouts in the ninth inning against the San Diego Padres. Kilian made 45 appearances for San Francisco, compiling a 3–6 record and 4.26 ERA with 56 strikeouts and eight saves across 44 1/3 innings pitched.

=== Philadelphia Phillies ===
On August 3, 2026, the Giants traded Kilian and Luis Arráez to the Philadelphia Phillies in exchange for Ramon Marquez and Marty Gair. He made four appearances for Philadelphia, struggling to a 13.50 ERA with three strikeouts across 3 1/3 innings pitched. On August 10, Kilian was placed on the injured list due to a left oblique strain. He was transferred to the 60–day injured list on September 17, officially ending his season.
