= Heliot Ramos =

Puerto Rican baseball player (born 1999)

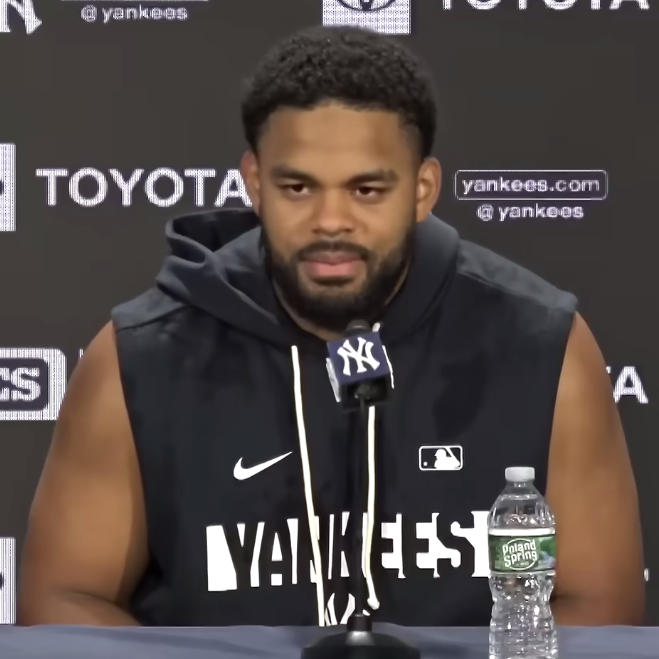
- Ramos with the New York Yankees in 2026

New York Yankees – No. 34
- Outfielder
- Born: September 7, 1999 (age 27); Maunabo, Puerto Rico
- Bats: Right Throws: Right

MLB debut
- April 10, 2022, for the San Francisco Giants

MLB statistics (through 2026 season)
- Batting average: .253
- Home runs: 57
- Runs batted in: 189
- Stats at Baseball Reference

Teams
- San Francisco Giants (2022–2026); New York Yankees (2026–present)

Career highlights and awards
- All-Star (2024)

Heliot Lemuel Ramos Lebrón (pronounced "Eliot"; born September 7, 1999) is a Puerto Rican professional baseball outfielder for the New York Yankees of Major League Baseball (MLB). He has previously played in MLB for the San Francisco Giants. Ramos was selected by the Giants in the first round of the 2017 MLB draft and made his MLB debut in 2022.

== Amateur career ==
Ramos attended Leadership Christian Academy in Guaynabo, Puerto Rico. He played for the Las Lomas Potros travel ball club in Puerto Rico. Ramos was the Most Valuable Player of the 2016 Under Armour All-America Baseball Game, a showcase of high school juniors and seniors that was held at Wrigley Field on July 23, 2016. He committed to play baseball at Florida International University, prior to signing his professional contract.

== Professional career ==
=== San Francisco Giants ===
==== 2017–18 ====
The San Francisco Giants selected Ramos in the first round, with the 19th overall selection, of the 2017 MLB draft. He signed for a signing bonus of $3,101,700.

Ramos began his professional career in 2017 with the Arizona League Giants of the Rookie-level Arizona League, based at the team's minor league complex in Scottsdale, Arizona. He was ranked first in the league with a .645 slugging percentage, 2nd with a .348 batting average, 8th with a .404 on-base percentage, 2nd with a 1.049 on base plus slugging percentage (OPS), and tied for 7th with six home runs in 138 at bats. Following the season, Baseball America named Ramos a 2017 Rookie-Level Classification All-Star, and he was one of only three outfielders selected among players in the four Rookie-level leagues. In the Giants' 2017 draft class, Baseball America rated Ramos as the Best Power Hitter, Best Defensive Player, and Best Athlete, and as having the Best Pro Debut. He was also named an Arizona League post-season All Star, and an MiLB.com Organization All Star. Ramos participated in the Giants' Instructional League following the 2017 season.

In 2018, Ramos played with the Augusta GreenJackets of the Single-A South Atlantic League. He hit .245/.313/.396 with 11 home runs and 52 RBIs, and 8 steals in 15 attempts, in 485 at bats over 124 games. He was a 2018 Futures Game selection.

==== 2019–22 ====
He began the 2019 season with the San Jose Giants of the High-A California League. Ramos was named to the 2019 All-Star Futures Game. With San Jose, he batted .306(4th in the California League)/.385(9th)/.500 in 294 at bats. In August, the Giants promoted Ramos, 19 years of age at the time, to the Richmond Flying Squirrels of the Double-A Eastern League. Over 389 at bats in 102 games between the two teams, Ramos slashed .290/.369/.481 with 16 home runs and 55 RBIs, and 8 steals in 18 attempts. He was an All Star Futures Game selection. He was named a California League mid-season and post-season All Star, and an MiLB.com Organization All Star. In the Arizona Fall League he batted .185/.250/.262 in 65 at bats.

In 2021, Ramos was selected to play in the All-Star Futures Game. In July 2021, Ramos was promoted to the Triple-A Sacramento River Cats. Across 449 at bats, while 5.7 years younger than the average player in the league, Ramos hit .254/.323/.416 with 15 steals in 19 attempts. Ramos was added to the 40-man roster following the season on November 19, 2021. He was ranked sixth in the Giants 2022 MLB Prospect Rankings.

In 2022, playing for Triple-A Sacramento, he batted .227/.305/.349 in 427 at bats, with 61 runs, 11 home runs, and 45 RBIs. He played 49 games in center field, 33 in right field, 21 in left field, and 8 at DH. The Giants promoted Ramos to the major leagues on April 10, 2022. With the Giants, he batted 2-for-20.

==== 2023 ====
On March 10, 2023, Ramos was optioned to Triple-A Sacramento to begin the 2023 season. He made 9 appearances for the Giants before being placed on the 60-day injured list on May 19 with a right oblique strain. On July 18, he was activated and optioned to Triple–A Sacramento. In 25 games for San Francisco, Ramos batted .179/.233/.304 with one home run and two RBI.

==== 2024 ====
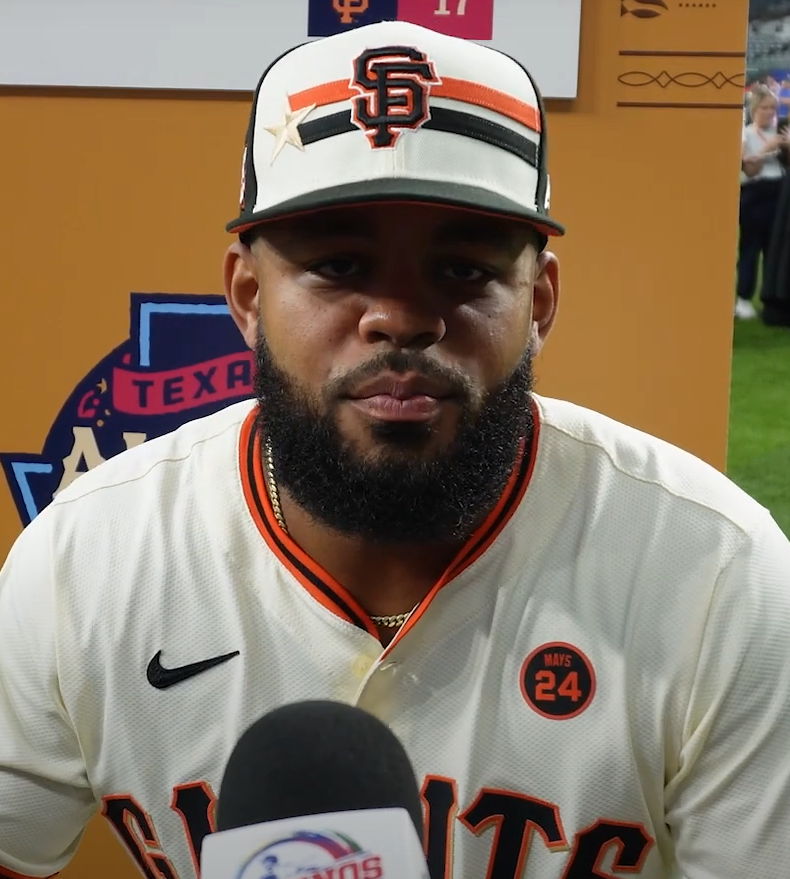
Ramos at the 2024 MLB All-Star Game

Ramos was optioned to Triple–A Sacramento to begin the 2024 season. In 30 games with the River Cats, he hit .296/.388/.565 with 8 home runs, 23 runs, and 21 RBIs. The Giants promoted Ramos to the major leagues once again on May 8, 2024, when Jorge Soler was placed on the 10-day injury list.

Ramos was selected to the 2024 MLB All-Star Game for the National League as a backup. At the time of his selection, he was hitting .299/.370/.517 with 12 home runs and 41 RBIs. He is the first homegrown Giants outfielder to make the All-Star game since Chili Davis in 1986.

On September 15, 2024, Ramos hit a ninth-inning, game-tying home run against Robert Suárez of the San Diego Padres, directly into McCovey Cove. This was the first "splash hit" by a right-handed batter in Oracle Park's 25-year history. The Giants lost the game 4–3 in 10 innings.

==== 2025 ====
On April 27, 2025, Ramos came up to lead off in the bottom of the 9th in a 2-2 game against the Texas Rangers. He hit a slow chopper which was fielded by Rangers pitcher Luke Jackson. Jackson then proceeded to throw the ball away allowing Ramos to advance to third. The ball would be thrown away again leading Ramos to walk the game off with a "Little League home run". Ramos played in 157 games for San Francisco during the regular season, slashing .256/.328/.400 with 21 home runs and 69 RBI.

==== 2026 ====
Ramos made 74 appearances for the Giants during the 2026 season, batting .264/.304/.424 with nine home runs, 34 RBI, and three stolen bases.

=== New York Yankees ===
On August 3, 2026, the Giants traded Ramos to the New York Yankees in exchange for Henry Lalane and Kaeden Kent.

== Personal life ==
Ramos is the younger brother of Héctor Ramos, a professional soccer player and the former all-time top scorer of the Puerto Rican national team. He is also the younger brother of Henry Ramos, also a professional baseball outfielder, who made his MLB debut in 2021 with the Arizona Diamondbacks.
