= Jesús Rodríguez (baseball) =

Venezuelan baseball player (born 2002)

San Francisco Giants – No. 79
- Catcher
- Born: April 23, 2002 (age 24); La Victoria, Venezuela
- Bats: Right Throws: Right

MLB debut
- May 4, 2026, for the San Francisco Giants

MLB statistics (through 2026 season)
- Batting average: .235
- Home runs: 2
- Runs batted in: 8

Teams
- San Francisco Giants (2026–present)

Jesús Eduardo Rodríguez (born April 23, 2002) is a Venezuelan professional baseball catcher for the San Francisco Giants of Major League Baseball (MLB). He made his MLB debut in 2026.

== Career ==
=== New York Yankees ===
On July 2, 2018, Rodríguez signed with the New York Yankees as an international free agent. He made his professional debut in 2019 with the Dominican Summer League Yankees. Rodríguez did not play in a game in 2020 due to the cancellation of the minor league season because of the COVID-19 pandemic.

Rodríguez returned to action in 2021 with the DSL Yankees, hitting .294/.397/.413 with no home runs, 22 RBI, and eight stolen bases across 39 appearances. He spent the 2022 campaign with the rookie–level Florida Complex League Yankees, playing in 37 games and batting .349/.434/.576 with four home runs, 24 RBI, and eight stolen bases. Rodríguez split 2023 between the Single–A Tampa Tarpons and High–A Hudson Valley Renegades. In 109 games for the two affiliates, he slashed .310/.399/.450 with career–highs in home runs (9), RBI (62), and stolen bases (21).

In 2024, Rodríguez played in 79 games split between High–A Hudson Valley and the Double–A Somerset Patriots, slashing .302/.375/.481 with 10 home runs, 47 RBI, and nine stolen bases. Following the season, the Yankees added Rodríguez to their 40-man roster to protect him from the Rule 5 draft.

Rodríguez was optioned to Double-A Somerset to begin the 2025 season, and was promoted to the Triple-A Scranton/Wilkes-Barre RailRiders after seven games. In 78 appearances for Scranton, he batted .317/.409/.430 with five home runs, 41 RBI, and 16 stolen bases.

=== San Francisco Giants ===
On July 31, 2025, the Yankees traded Rodríguez, Trystan Vrieling, Parks Harber, and Carlos De La Rosa to the San Francisco Giants in exchange for Camilo Doval. He made 39 appearances down the stretch for the Triple-A Sacramento River Cats, batting .322/.399/.401 with two home runs, 16 RBI, and four stolen bases.

Rodríguez was optioned to Triple-A Sacramento to begin the 2026 season. In 24 appearances for the River Cats, he batted .330/.400/.440 with two home runs, 14 RBI, and four stolen bases. On May 4, 2026, Rodríguez was promoted to the major leagues for the first time. On May 6 against the San Diego Padres, Rodríguez singled against Walker Buehler for his first career hit; later in the game, Rodríguez homered against Jeremiah Estrada for his first MLB home run. He made 22 appearances for San Francisco during his rookie campaign, batting .235/.316/.412 with two home runs, eight RBI, and one stolen base. On August 1, Rodríguez was placed on the injured list due to right elbow neuritis. He was transferred to the 60–day injured list on September 4, officially ending his season.
