= San Francisco Giants minor league players =

List of baseball players

Below are select minor league players, and the rosters of the minor league affiliates, of the San Francisco Giants:

== Players ==
=== Maui Ahuna ===
Maui Ahuna
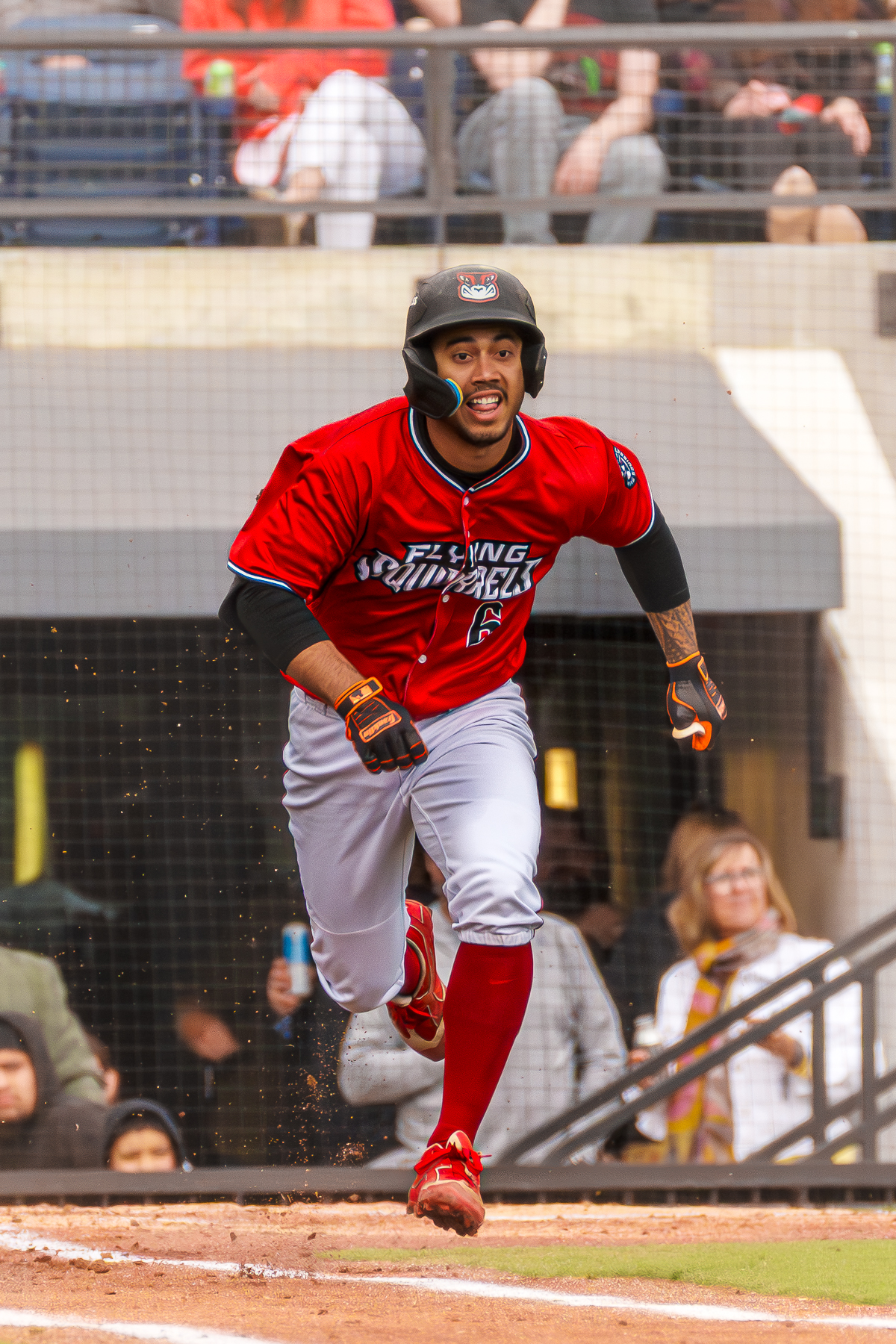
- Ahuna with Richmond Flying Squirrels in 2026

San Francisco Giants
- Shortstop
- Born: March 11, 2002 (age 24); Hilo, Hawaii, U.S.
- Bats: Left Throws: Right

Walter Clyde "Maui" Ahuna (born March 11, 2002) is an American professional baseball shortstop in the San Francisco Giants organization.

Ahuna went to Hilo High School, where he would play baseball. As a junior in 2019, he batted .531. After going unselected in the 2020 Major League Baseball draft he enrolled at Kansas University to play college baseball for the Kansas Jayhawks.

Ahuna went into the 2021 season being the Jayhawks' starting shortstop, and he was named the Big 12 Conference Newcomer of Week once during the season. He finished the season having started fifty games while batting .316 with one home run, 25 RBIs, and 11 doubles. That summer, he played for both the Burlington Sock Puppets of the Appalachian League and the Falmouth Commodores of the Cape Cod Baseball League. Ahuna returned as the Jayhawks' starting shortstop for the 2022 season. Over 53 games, he hit .396 with eight home runs, 48 RBIs, and 16 doubles. Following the season's end, Ahuna announced he would be entering the transfer portal. He then announced he would be transferring to the University of Tennessee. He briefly returned to play for Falmouth that summer alongside playing for the USA Baseball Collegiate National Team.

Ahuna did not play with Tennessee during the first eight games of the 2023 season, as he had to wait through a compliance delay. He was later ruled eligible. He appeared in 53 games for Tennessee and hit .312 with eight home runs and 42 RBIs.

Ahuna was selected by the San Francisco Giants in the fourth round, with the 117th overall selection, of the 2023 Major League Baseball draft. On July 25, 2023, Ahuna signed with the Giants for a below slot deal worth $500,000.

Ahuna made his professional debut in 2024 with the Arizona Complex League Giants and also played with the San Jose Giants. He was placed on the injured list twice during the season. Over 34 games, he hit .268 with four home runs and 23 RBIs. Ahuna played the 2025 season with the ACL Giants, San Jose, and the Eugene Emeralds, batting .269 with five home runs, 36 RBIs, and 22 doubles over 63 games between the three teams. He missed time due to injury, including a hip injury and recovery from Tommy John surgery. After the season, he was assigned to play in the Arizona Fall League with the Scottsdale Scorpions

- Career statistics from MLB · ESPN · Baseball Reference (Minors)
- Kansas Jayhawks bio
- Tennessee Volunteers bio

=== Josh Bostick ===
Josh Bostick

San Francisco Giants
- Pitcher
- Born: October 20, 2001 (age 25); Dallas, Texas, U.S.
- Bats: Right Throws: Right

Louis Sexton Bostick (born October 20, 2001) is an American professional baseball pitcher in the San Francisco Giants organization

Bostick played college baseball at Howard College, Hillsborough College and Grayson College. He was selected by the San Francisco Giants in the eighth round of the 2023 Major League Baseball draft. The Giants added him to their 40-man roster after the 2026 season.

- Career statistics from Baseball Reference (Minors)

=== Jacob Bresnahan ===
Jacob Bresnahan

San Francisco Giants
- Pitcher
- Born: June 27, 2005 (age 21); Renton, Washington, U.S.
- Bats: Left Throws: Left

Jacob Daniel Lee Bresnahan (born June 27, 2005) is an American professional baseball pitcher in the San Francisco Giants organization.

Bresnahan attended Sumner High School in Sumner, Washington. As a senior in 2023, he had a 9-1 win-loss record with a 0.88 earned run average (ERA) alongside batting .393 with four home runs. He committed to play college baseball at the University of Oregon.

Bresnahan was selected by the Cleveland Guardians in the 13th round of the 2023 Major League Baseball draft. He signed with the team and made his professional debut with the Rookie-level Arizona Complex League Guardians with whom he pitched four innings. He was assigned back to the ACL Guardians to open the 2024 season and promoted to the Single-A Lynchburg Hillcats during the season. With the ACL Guardians, he was named ACL Pitcher of the Year with a 2.54 ERA over 11 starts.

On July 30, 2024, Bresnahan and a player to be named later were traded to the San Francisco Giants in exchange for Alex Cobb. The Giants assigned him to the Single-A San Jose Giants. Across 19 total starts for the 2024 season with the ACL Guardians, Lynchburg, and San Jose, he had a 1–7 record, a 5.04 ERA, and 87 strikeouts. Bresnahan was assigned to San Jose for the 2025 season and made 22 starts in which he pitched to a 9–3 record, a 2.61 ERA, and 124 strikeouts over 93 innings. He was named the California League Pitcher of the Year. He was assigned to the High-A Eugene Emeralds to open the 2026 season with whom he started 20 games and went 7–3 with a 2.92 ERA and 118 strikeouts across 98 2/3 innings. In late August, he was promoted to the Double-A Richmond Flying Squirrels. Across three starts with Richmond to end the season, Bresnahan had a 5.06 ERA and 17 strikeouts over 16 innings.

- Career statistics from Baseball Reference (Minors)

=== Jack Choate ===
Jack Choate

San Francisco Giants
- Pitcher
- Born: April 18, 2001 (age 25); Miami, Florida, U.S.
- Bats: Left Throws: Left

Jack Choate (born April 18, 2001) is an American professional baseball pitcher in the San Francisco Giants organization.

Choate attended Westborough High School in Westborough, Massachusetts, and played college baseball at Assumption University. As a junior at Assumption in 2022, Choate appeared in 13 games and pitched to a 2.43 ERA. After the season, he was selected by the San Francisco Giants in the ninth round of the 2022 Major League Baseball draft.

Choate made his professional debut after signing with the Arizona Complex League Giants, pitching a total of four innings. He was assigned to the San Jose Giants to begin the 2023 season before he was promoted to the Eugene Emeralds. Over 18 games (ten starts) between the two teams, Choate went 3–3 with a 2.25 ERA and 87 strikeouts over 68 innings. He was assigned to play in the Arizona Fall League after the season. Choate returned to Eugene to open the 2024 season and was promoted to the Richmond Flying Squirrels in early August. He started a total of 26 games between both teams, going 2–7 with a 3.79 ERA and 128 strikeouts. Choate played with Richmond in 2025, appearing in 29 games (24 starts) and pitching to a 4–6 record, a 3.51 ERA and 123 strikeouts over 102 2/3 innings. He returned to Richmond for the 2026 season and made 33 appearances in which he went 6–3 with a 4.38 ERA and 65 strikeouts across 51 1/3 innings.

- Career statistics from MLB · Baseball Reference (Minors)
- Assumption Greyhounds bio

=== Jakob Christian ===
Jakob Christian

San Francisco Giants
- First baseman
- Born: September 17, 2002 (age 24); San Diego, California, U.S.
- Bats: Right Throws: Right

Jakob Cameron Max Christian (born September 17, 2002) is an American professional baseball first baseman in the San Francisco Giants organization.

Christian attended St. Augustine High School in San Diego and played two seasons of college baseball at Point Loma Nazarene University. In 2023, he was named the NCAA Division II Ron Lenz Player of the Year after setting Point Loma Nazarene single-season records for home runs with 28 and RBI with 70. In 2023, he played collegiate summer baseball with the Yarmouth–Dennis Red Sox of the Cape Cod Baseball League. He transferred to the University of San Diego for his junior year in 2024. In his lone season at San Diego, Christian hit .364 with 26 home runs and 67 RBI and was named the West Coast Conference Player of the Year. He was also named an All-American, making him the first San Diego player since Kris Bryant to earn the honor.

Christian was selected by the San Francisco Giants in the fifth round of the 2024 Major League Baseball draft. He made his professional debut in 2024 with the Single-A San Jose Giants with whom he appeared in nine games. In 2025, he played for San Jose and the High-A Eugene Emeralds and batted .279 with 14 home runs, 74 RBI, 28 doubles and 15 stolen bases across 93 games. Christian returned to Eugene for the 2026 season and hit .253 with nine home runs and 36 RBI across 55 games while missing time due to injury.

- Career statistics from Baseball Reference (Minors)
- San Diego Toreros bio

=== Trevor Cohen ===
Trevor Cohen

San Francisco Giants
- Outfielder
- Born: October 29, 2003 (age 23); Galloway, New Jersey, U.S.
- Bats: Left Throws: Left

Trevor Ryan Cohen (born October 29, 2003) is an American professional baseball outfielder in the San Francisco Giants organization.

Cohen attended Holy Spirit High School in Absecon, New Jersey and played three seasons of college baseball at Rutgers University for the Scarlet Knights. In 2025, his junior season at Rutgers, Cohen played in 57 games and batted .387 with two home runs, 36 RBI, 19 stolen bases, and a Rutgers single-season record 24 doubles. After the season, he attended the MLB Draft Combine at Chase Field.

Cohen was selected by the San Francisco Giants in the third round with the 85th overall pick of the 2025 Major League Baseball draft. He made his professional debut after signing with the Single-A San Jose Giants with whom he batted .327 with one home run across 28 games, including a .438 batting average during the California League playoffs. Cohen was assigned to the High-A Eugene Emeralds to start the 2026 season. In July, he was promoted to the Double-A Richmond Flying Squirrels. Across 129 games between the two teams, Cohen batted .298 with six home runs, 53 RBI, and 46 stolen bases. His 161 hits were third most in the minor leagues.

- Career statistics from Baseball Reference (Minors)
- Rutgers Scarlet Knights bio

=== Robert Cranz ===
Robert Cranz

San Francisco Giants
- Pitcher
- Born: May 28, 2003 (age 23); Keller, Texas, U.S.
- Bats: Right Throws: Right

Robert Thomas Cranz (born May 28, 2003) is an American professional baseball pitcher in the Washington Nationals organization.

Cranz attended Keller High School in Keller, Texas and graduated in 2021. He played two seasons of college baseball at Wichita State University before transferring to Oklahoma State University for the 2024 season. In Cranz's lone season at Oklahoma State, he made 30 relief appearances and had a 1.63 ERA with 59 strikeouts.

Cranz was selected by the Washington Nationals in the seventh round of the 2024 Major League Baseball draft. He signed with the Nationals for $190,000. He made his professional debut after signing with the Single-A Fredericksburg Nationals with whom he made four scoreless relief appearances. In 2025, he began the season with Fredericksburg and was promoted to the High-A Wilmington Blue Rocks in July. He had a 1–3 record, a 2.02 ERA, 45 strikeouts and 11 saves across 35 2/3 innings pitched between both teams. Cranz returned to Wilmington to begin the 2026 season and was promoted to the Double-A Harrisburg Senators and Triple-A Rochester Red Wings during the season. He made 48 relief appearances between the three teams and went 4–5 with a 5.17 ERA and 76 strikeouts across 54 innings.

On November 6, 2026, Cranz was traded to the San Francisco Giants in exchange for Reiver Sanmartín.

- Career statistics from Baseball Reference (Minors)
- Oklahoma State Cowboys bio

=== Marty Gair ===
Marty Gair

San Francisco Giants
- Pitcher
- Born: July 17, 2003 (age 23); Troy, Michigan, U.S.
- Bats: Right Throws: Right

Martin Thomas Gair (born July 17, 2003) is an American professional baseball pitcher in the San Francisco Giants organization

Gair attended Cox Mill High School in Concord, North Carolina and played college baseball at the University of North Carolina at Wilmington and Florida SouthWestern State College. He was selected by the Philadelphia Phillies in the 13th round of the 2023 Major League Baseball draft.

On August 3, 2026, the Phillies traded Gair and Ramon Marquez to the San Francisco Giants in exchange for Luis Arráez and Caleb Kilian. The Giants added him to their 40-man roster after the 2026 season.

- Career statistics from Baseball Reference (Minors)

=== Josuar González ===
Josuar González

San Francisco Giants
- Shortstop
- Born: October 16, 2007 (age 19); San Cristobal, Dominican Republic
- Bats: Switch Throws: Right

Josuar De Jesus González (born October 16, 2007) is a Dominican professional baseball shortstop in the San Francisco Giants organization.

González was rated as one of the top international prospects in the 2025 class. In January 2025, he signed with the San Francisco Giants.

González made his professional debut with the Dominican Summer League Giants.

- Career statistics from Baseball Reference (Minors)

=== Parks Harber ===
Parks Harber

San Francisco Giants
- Third baseman
- Born: September 25, 2001 (age 25); Atlanta, Georgia, U.S.
- Bats: Right Throws: Right

Thomas Parks Harber (born September 25, 2001) is an American professional baseball third baseman in the San Francisco Giants organization.

Harber attended The Westminster Schools in Charlotte, North Carolina. He played three years of college baseball for the Georgia Bulldogs and one for the North Carolina Tar Heels. In 2022, he played collegiate summer baseball with the Brewster Whitecaps of the Cape Cod Baseball League.

Harber signed with the New York Yankees as an undrafted free agent in 2024. He made his professional debut that year with the Tampa Tarpons. He started 2025 with Tampa and was promoted to the Hudson Valley Renegades.

On July 31, 2025, the Yankees traded Harber, Trystan Vrieling, Jesús Rodríguez, and Carlos De La Rosa to the San Francisco Giants in exchange for Camilo Doval. He started his Giants career with the Eugene Emeralds. After the season, he played in the Arizona Fall League. Harber started the 2026 season with the Richmond Flying Squirrels.

- Career statistics from Baseball Reference (Minors)

=== Luis Hernández ===
Luis Hernández

San Francisco Giants
- Shortstop
- Born: December 13, 2008 (age 17); San Juan De Los Morros, Venezuela
- Bats: Right Throws: Right

Luis Hernández (born December 13, 2008) is a Dominican professional baseball shortstop in the San Francisco Giants organization.

Hernández played in the Liga Mayor de Béisbol Profesional (LMBP) when he was 15 and hit .346. He was rated as the top international prospect in the 2026 class and signed with the San Francisco Giants in January 2026.

Hernández made his professional debut with the Arizona Complex League Giants.

=== Henry Lalane ===
Henry Lalane

San Francisco Giants
- Pitcher
- Born: May 18, 2004 (age 22); The Bronx, New York, U.S.
- Bats: Left Throws: Left

Henry Luis Lalane (born May 18, 2004) is an American professional baseball pitcher in the San Francisco Giants organization.

Lalane was born in the Bronx, New York, and moved to the Dominican Republic when he was young. He signed with the New York Yankees as an international free agent in May 2021.

Lalane made his professional debut in 2021 with the Dominican Summer League Yankees and also pitched 2022 with them. In 2023, he played for the Florida Complex League Yankees.

On August 3, 2026, the Yankees traded Lalane and Kaeden Kent to the San Francisco Giants in exchange for Heliot Ramos.

- Career statistics from Baseball Reference (Minors)

=== Jhonny Level ===
Jhonny Level

San Francisco Giants
- Shortstop
- Born: March 29, 2007 (age 19); Cumaná, Venezuela
- Bats: Switch Throws: Right

Jhonny Jose Level (born March 29, 2007) is a Venezuelan professional baseball shortstop in the San Francisco Giants organization.

Level signed with the San Francisco Giants as an international free agent in 2024 for $997,500. He made his professional debut that year with the Rookie-level Dominican Summer League Giants and hit .275 with ten home runs and 46 RBI over 48 games.

Level was assigned to the Rookie-level Arizona Complex League Giants to open the 2025 season. In July, he was promoted to the Single-A San Jose Giants. Over 89 games played for the season, Level hit .269 with 12 home runs, 50 RBI, and 21 stolen bases. He returned to San Jose to open the 2026 season. Level hit .325 with ten home runs and 47 RBI across 44 games with San Jose and was subsequently promoted to the High-A Eugene Emeralds in early June. Across 69 games with Eugene, he batted .302 with eight home runs and 40 RBI.

- Career statistics from Baseball Reference (Minors)

=== Ramon Marquez ===
Ramon Marquez

San Francisco Giants
- Pitcher
- Born: September 19, 2005 (age 21); Phoenix, Arizona, U.S.
- Bats: Right Throws: Right

Ramon Marquez (born September 19, 2005) is an American professional baseball pitcher in the San Francisco Giants organization.

Marquez was born in Phoenix, Arizona but moved to Chihuahua with the goal to play professionally. As a relatively unknown prospect, he signed with the Philadelphia Phillies as an international free agent out of Mexico for $10,000 in January 2025. He spent his first professional season that year with the Florida Complex League Phillies and Clearwater Threshers.

Marquez started 2026 with Clearwater before being promoted to the Jersey Shore BlueClaws.

On August 3, 2026, the Phillies traded Marquez and Marty Gair to the San Francisco Giants in exchange for Luis Arráez and Caleb Kilian.

- Career statistics from Baseball Reference (Minors)

=== Walker Martin ===
Walker Martin

San Francisco Giants
- Shortstop
- Born: February 20, 2004 (age 22); Greeley, Colorado, U.S.
- Bats: Left Throws: Right

Walker Jace Martin (born February 20, 2004) is an American professional baseball shortstop in the San Francisco Giants organization.

Martin grew up in Eaton, Colorado and attended Eaton High School. He was named the Colorado Gatorade Player of the Year in 2023 after batting .633 with 75 RBIs and also led all high school players in the nation with 20 home runs. Martin was also the starting quarterback for Eaton's football team and passed for 2,076 yards and 34 touchdowns as the Reds won the state championship. He committed to play college baseball for the Arkansas Razorbacks prior to signing with the Giants.

Martin was selected by the San Francisco Giants with the 52nd overall pick in the 2023 Major League Baseball draft. He signed with the team on July 17 and received an over-slot signing bonus of $2.998 million.

Martin made his professional debut in late May 2024 with the Arizona Complex League Giants and was promoted to the San Jose Giants in August. Over 69 games between both teams, he batted .218 with eight home runs and 38 RBIs. He returned to San Jose in 2025. Over 108 games, Martin hit .234 with 12 home runs and 70 RBIs.

- Career statistics from Baseball Reference (Minors)

=== Keyner Martínez ===
Keyner Martínez

San Francisco Giants
- Pitcher
- Born: August 16, 2004 (age 22); Maracay, Venezuela
- Bats: Right Throws: Right

Keyner Nahem Martínez (born August 16, 2004) is a Venezuelan professional baseball pitcher in the San Francisco Giants organization.

Martínez signed with the San Francisco Giants as an international free agent in July 2023. He made his professional debut in 2024 with the Arizona Complex League Giants.

Martínez played 2025 with the ACL Giants and San Jose Giants and started 2026 with San Jose.

- Career statistics from Baseball Reference (Minors)

=== Miguel Méndez ===
Miguel Méndez

San Francisco Giants
- Pitcher
- Born: July 1, 2002 (age 24); San Juan de la Maguana, Dominican Republic
- Bats: Left Throws: Left

Miguel José Méndez (born July 1, 2002) is a Dominican professional baseball pitcher for the San Francisco Giants of Major League Baseball (MLB).

Méndez signed with the San Diego Padres as an international free agent in February 2021. He made his professional debut that year with the Dominican Summer League Padres. He pitched 2022 with the Arizona Complex League Padres and Fort Wayne TinCaps and 2023 with the Lake Elsinore Storm. After the 2023 season he pitched in the Arizona Fall League.

Méndez spent 2024 with Lake Elsinore and started 2025 with Lake Elsinore before being promoted to Fort Wayne and the Double-A San Antonio Missions. On November 18, 2025, the Padres added Méndez to their 40-man roster to protect him from the Rule 5 draft.

Méndez was optioned to Double-A San Antonio to begin the 2026 season.

On August 3, 2026, the Padres traded Méndez and Joniel Hernandez to the San Francisco Giants in exchange for Robbie Ray.

- Career statistics from Baseball Reference (Minors)

=== Diego Velasquez ===
Diego Velasquez
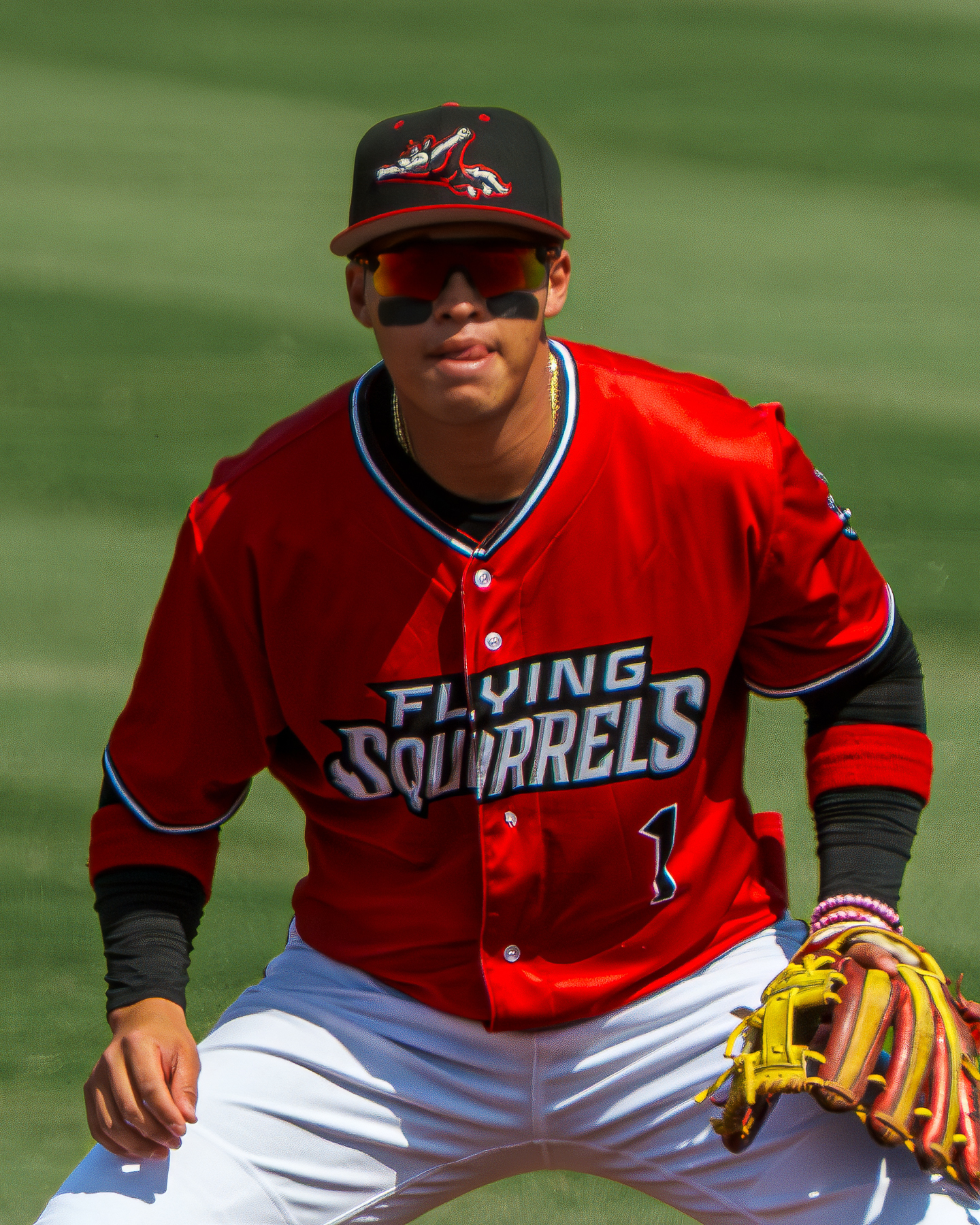

San Francisco Giants
- Shortstop
- Born: October 1, 2003 (age 23); Maracay, Venezuela
- Bats: Switch Throws: Right

Diego Jesus Velasquez (born October 1, 2003) is a Venezuelan professional baseball shortstop in the San Francisco Giants organization.

Velasquez signed with the San Francisco Giants on January 15, 2021, for a signing bonus of $900,000. He made his professional debut in 2021 with the Arizona Complex League Giants. Velasquez split the 2022 campaign between the ACL Giants and San Jose Giants, compiling a slash line of .251/.338/.315 with a home run and 20 RBI. He returned to San Jose for the 2023 season. Over 111 games with San Jose, he slashed .298/.387/.434 with 8 home runs, 69 RBI, and 23 stolen bases.

During the 2024 campaign, Velasquez split time between the High–A Eugene Emeralds and Double–A Richmond Flying Squirrels, compiling a slash line of .288/.368/.384 with four home runs, 46 RBI, and 21 stolen bases. He was assigned to Richmond to open the 2025 season.

- Career statistics from Baseball Reference (Minors)

=== Trystan Vrieling ===
Trystan Vrieling

San Francisco Giants
- Pitcher
- Born: October 2, 2000 (age 26); Lewiston, Idaho, U.S.
- Bats: Right Throws: Right

Trystan Blake Vrieling (born October 2, 2000) is an American professional baseball pitcher in the San Francisco Giants organization. He played college baseball for the Gonzaga Bulldogs.

Vrieling grew up in Kennewick, Washington and attended Kamiakin High School. He was named the Mid-Columbia Conference Pitcher of the Year as a senior.

Vrieling played college baseball at Gonzaga Bulldogs for three seasons. He made five appearances during his freshman season and had a 1.08 ERA in 8 1/3 innings pitched. As a sophomore, Vrieling had a 1–3 record with a 3.88 ERA and 66 strikeouts in 48 2/3 innings pitched over 22 appearances. He moved to the Bulldogs' starting rotation prior to the start of his junior season and went 4–4 with a 4.91 ERA and 107 strikeouts. In 2021, he played collegiate summer baseball with the Bourne Braves of the Cape Cod Baseball League.

Vrieling was selected in the third round of the 2022 Major League Baseball draft by the New York Yankees. He signed with the team on July 28, 2022, and received a $611,400 signing bonus. Vrieling was placed on the 60-day injured list at the beginning of the 2023 season after suffering an elbow injury during spring training.

On July 31, 2025, the Yankees traded Vrieling, Jesús Rodríguez, Parks Harber and Carlos De La Rosa to the San Francisco Giants in exchange for Camilo Doval.

- Career statistics from Baseball Reference (Minors)
- Gonzaga Bulldogs bio

=== Joe Whitman ===
Joe Whitman
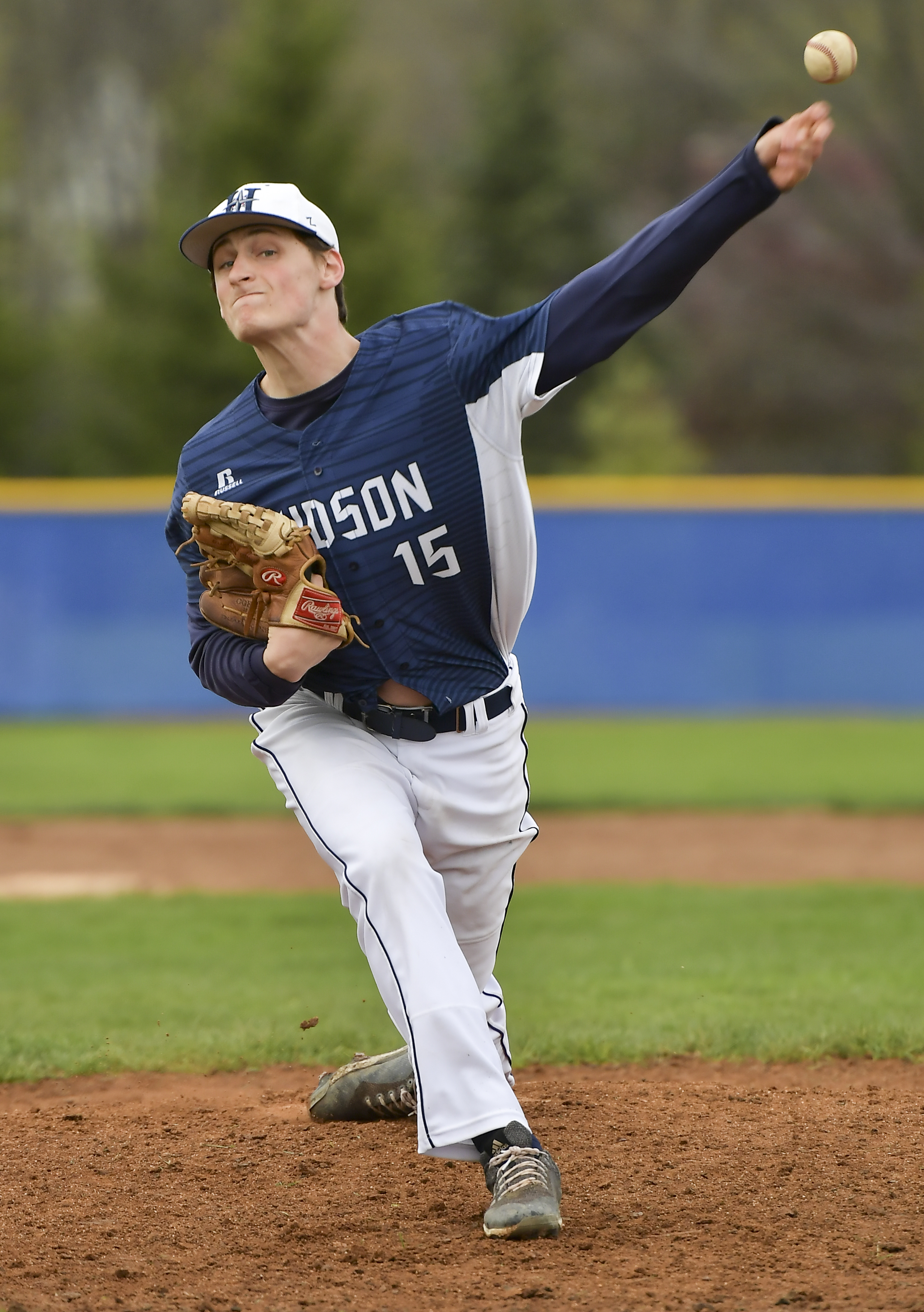
- Whitman with Hudson High School in 2019

San Francisco Giants
- Pitcher
- Born: September 17, 2001 (age 25); Akron, Ohio, U.S.
- Bats: Left Throws: Left

Joseph Daniel Whitman (born September 17, 2001) is an American professional baseball pitcher in the San Francisco Giants organization.

Whitman grew up in Hudson, Ohio, and attended Hudson High School, where he set the Ohio state record with ten saves as a junior in 2019. His senior season in 2020 was cancelled due to the COVID-19 pandemic.

Whitman began his collegiate baseball career at Purdue. He only pitched 5 2/3 innings over two seasons for the Boilermakers before transferring to Kent State. In his first season with the team in 2023, Whitman went 9–2 with a 2.56 ERA and 100 strikeouts. For his performance on the year, Whitman earned first team All-Mid-American Conference (MAC), and was named the MAC Pitcher of the Year. He was also named a first team All-American. In 2023, he played collegiate summer baseball with the Cotuit Kettleers of the Cape Cod Baseball League.

Whitman was selected by the San Francisco Giants with the 69th overall pick in the 2023 Major League Baseball draft. He signed with the Giants for $805,575.

Whitman made his professional debut after signing with the Arizona League Giants and also played with the San Jose Giants, pitching to a 1.86 ERA over six games. He split the 2024 season between San Jose and the Eugene Emeralds, starting 23 games and going 3–8 with a 4.63 ERA and 108 strikeouts over 103 innings. Whitman was assigned to the Richmond Flying Squirrels for the 2025 season.

- Career statistics from MLB · Baseball Reference (Minors)
- Purdue Boilermakers bio
- Kent State Golden Flashes bio

== Full Triple-A to Rookie League rosters ==
=== Triple-A ===
Sacramento River Cats roster
Players		Coaches/Other
Pitchers: 58 Will Bednar; 40 John Michael Bertrand; 40 Eric Cerantola; -- Reggie Crawford; -- Jason Foley; -- Blake Holub; 49 Logan Martin; 51 Darien Smith; 38 Dale Stanavich; 75 Tyler Vogel; 33 Trystan Vrieling; 56 Joe Whitman; 52 Nick Zwack	Catchers: 48 Fernando Gonzalez; 14 Adrián Sugastey; Infielders: 28 Parks Harber; 13 Charlie Szykowny; 26 Diego Velasquez; Outfielders: 12 Zane Zielinski	Manager: 45 Dave Brundage; Coaches: 8 Jolbert Cabrera (fundamentals); 16 Will Kahn (bullpen catcher); 31 P.J. Pilittere (hitting); 43 Alain Quijano (pitching); 50 Rob Riggins (assistant hitting); 7-day injured list; * On San Francisco Giants 40-man roster; ~ Development list; # Rehab assignment; ∞ Reserve list; ‡ Restricted list; § Suspended list; † Temporarily inactive list; Roster updated November 15, 2026; Transactions; → More rosters: MiLB • Pacific Coast League; → San Francisco Giants minor league players

=== Double-A ===
Richmond Flying Squirrels roster
Players		Coaches/Other
Pitchers: 32 Jacob Bresnahan; 48 Jack Choate; 43 Greg Farone; 18 Jackson Flora; 46 Marques Johnson; 53 Niko Mazza; 49 Charlie McDaniel; 37 Ben Peterson; 33 Shane Rademacher; 32 Tyler Switalski; 39 Ryan Vanderhei; 35 Mitch White	Catchers: 19 Ty Hanchey; 14 Jancel Villarroel; Infielders: 6 Maui Ahuna; 23 Jose Astudillo; 2 Sabin Ceballos; 15 Dayson Croes; 10 Zander Darby; 29 Kaeden Kent; 7 Gavin Kilen; 16 Jack Payton; Outfielders: 8 Trevor Cohen; 1 Lisbel Diaz; 5 Dakota Jordan; 13 Jean Carlos Sio	Manager: 12 Dennis Pelfrey; Coaches: 52 Tommy Everidge (hitting); 9 Mike Morris (bullpen); 17 Lipso Nava (fundamentals); 58 Paul Oseguera (pitching); 7-day injured list; * On San Francisco Giants 40-man roster; ~ Development list; # Rehab assignment; ∞ Reserve list; ‡ Restricted list; § Suspended list; † Temporarily inactive list; Roster updated November 17, 2026; Transactions; → More rosters: MiLB • Eastern League; → San Francisco Giants minor league players

=== High-A ===
Eugene Emeralds roster
Players		Coaches/Other
Pitchers: 16 Sam Bower; 54 Luis De La Torre; 52 Hunter Dryden; 53 Matt Dunaway; 39 Mauricio Estrella; 48 Jordan Gottesman; 14 Alix Hernandez; 17 Cole Hillier; 29 Gerelmi Maldonado; 16 Ramon Marquez; 28 Ubert Mejias; 48 Nate Nabholz; 13 Eric Nachtsheim; 41 Brayan Palencia; 45 Liam Simon; 43 Ryan Slater; 56 Cade Vernon; -- Esmerlin Vinicio; 33 Hayden Wynja	Catchers: 7 Charlie Muniz; 40 Daniel Rogers; Infielders: 6 Isaiah Barkett; 35 Robert Hipwell; 26 Hayden Jatczak; 9 Jhonny Level; 13 Walker Martin; 32 Dalton Wentz; Outfielders: 38 Damian Bravo; 26 Jakob Christian; 15 Cam Maldonado; 2 Jose Ortiz	Manager: 34 Jacob Heyward; Coaches: 61 Nate Keavy (fundamentals); 51 Braxton Lee (hitting); 10 Luis Pino (pitching); 7-day injured list; * On San Francisco Giants 40-man roster; ~ Development list; # Rehab assignment; ∞ Reserve list; ‡ Restricted list; § Suspended list; † Temporarily inactive list; Roster updated November 17, 2026; Transactions; → More rosters: MiLB • Northwest League; → San Francisco Giants minor league players

=== Single-A ===
San Jose Giants roster
Players		Coaches/Other
Pitchers: 28 Beau Bryans; 55 Ben Bybee; 31 Dylan Carter; 34 Argenis Cayama; 49 Samir Chires; 59 Cody Delvecchio; 46 Ricardo Estrada; 40 Alexander Fuentes; -- Drake George; 50 Evan Gray; 39 Ian Korn; 18 Chen-Hsun Lee; 37 Keyner Martínez; 43 Cooper McGrath; 15 Tony Neubeck; 48 Jose T. Perez; 41 Melvin Pineda; 54 Leandro Rodriguez; 32 Trey Seeley; 19 Fernando Vasquez	Catchers: 33 Junior Barajas; 17 Scott Gell; 2 Broedy Poppell; Infielders: 1 Josuar González; 39 Luis Hernández; 23 Jeremiah Jenkins; 35 Lorenzo Meola; 16 Luke Nixon; 6 Dario Reynoso; 15 Yosneiker Rivas; 7 Drew Smith; Outfielders: 15 Peyton Bonds; 9 Charlie Bussey III; 10 Angel Guzman; 57 Tanner Mally; 29 Andy Polanco; 26 Oliver Tejada	Manager: 12 Ydwin Villegas; Coaches: 58 Mike Marjama (hitting); 8 Drew Martinez (fundamentals); 45 Dan Runzler (pitching); 7-day injured list; * On San Francisco Giants 40-man roster; ~ Development list; # Rehab assignment; ∞ Reserve list; ‡ Restricted list; § Suspended list; † Temporarily inactive list; Roster updated November 2, 2026; Transactions; → More rosters: MiLB • California League; → San Francisco Giants minor league players

=== Rookie ===
Arizona Complex League Giants roster
Players		Coaches/Other
Pitchers: -- Carson Bolemon; -- Cody Brasch; -- Ryder Brooks; 32 Kendry Castro; 39 Carlos De La Rosa; 35 Dilan Fernandez; -- Colin Fisher; 41 Jose G. Gonzalez; 47 Alberto Laroche; -- Carlos Martinez; 14 Luke Mensik; -- Eric Nachtsheim; 40 Brayan Narvaez; -- Toran O'Harran; -- Gavin Perry; 31 Jose Rengel; 37 Johan Rodriguez; -- Alex Solis; -- Kaden Waechter; -- Kory Williams; -- Reid Worley; 52 Nien-Hsi Yang	Catchers: 13 Santiago Camacho; 33 Yohendry Sanchez; Infielders: -- Brody Acres; 9 Yulian Barreto; -- Mike Mancini; 23 Anthony Marquez; 5 Ryan Reckley; Outfielders: 18 Rayner Arias; 10 Carlos Concepcion; 7 Evan Estevez; 2 Luis Frias; -- Josiah Kemp; -- Carter Rust	Manager: 31 Jeremiah Knackstedt; Coaches: 23 Michael Blatchford (hitting); 43 Travis Ishikawa (hitting); 39 Joel Johnson (fundamentals); 6 Quinton McCracken (complex operations coordinator); 40 Mario Rodriguez (pitching); 29 Reuben St. Amand (bullpen catcher); 7-day injured list; * On San Francisco Giants 40-man roster; ~ Development list; # Rehab assignment; ∞ Reserve list; ‡ Restricted list; § Suspended list; † Temporarily inactive list; Roster updated November 15, 2026; Transactions; → More rosters: MiLB • Arizona Complex League; → San Francisco Giants minor league players

=== Foreign Rookie ===
Dominican Summer League Giants Black roster
Players		Coaches/Other
Pitchers: 23 Lender Bracho; 38 Brayan Cabello; 50 Omar Calcuran; 46 Simon Colmenares; 56 Luis Custodio; 10 Jose De La Rosa; 33 Randry De Leon; 54 Hector Dos Santos; 49 Rainiel Duran; 43 Alexis Gonzalez ‡; 39 Santiago Guerrero; 10 Luis Hernandez; 53 Jeremiah Jones; 37 Ebduar Loina; 34 Jose Meza; 35 Frank Quiroz; 45 Edwin Reynoso; 80 Moises Soto; 31 Carlos Toro; 46 Abraham Utrera; 40 Elkyns Villarreal	Catchers: 21 Diego Alambarrio; 32 Alessandro Duran; 19 Luis Padron; Infielders: 5 Alexander Camacaro; 6 Keiberg Camacaro; 18 Joniel Hernandez; 8 Nelson Lopez; 7 Dennys Riera; 16 Anthony Tandron; 0 Franco Willias; Outfielders: 12 Vinicius Dos Santos; 29 Rainer Espinoza; 9 Djean Macares; 14 Diego Villegas	Manager: -- Juan Ciriaco; Coaches: -- Crisford Adames (fundamentals); -- Jon Erhard (hitting); -- Osiris Matos (pitching); -- Hector Ortiz (fundamentals); 7-day injured list; * On San Francisco Giants 40-man roster; ~ Development list; # Rehab assignment; ∞ Reserve list; ‡ Restricted list; § Suspended list; † Temporarily inactive list; Roster updated November 3, 2026; Transactions; → More rosters: MiLB • Dominican Summer League; → San Francisco Giants minor league players

Dominican Summer League Giants Orange roster
Players		Coaches/Other
Pitchers: -- Winkel Del Rosario; 18 Alberto Gomez; -- Alexis Gonzalez; 65 Jose D. Gonzalez; 54 Mario Gonzalez; 48 Jhon Leon; 38 Jesus Lopez; 37 Frainer Mejias; 58 Iverson Paulino; 33 Alfonso Perez; 50 Josue Perez; 35 Johan Rengifo; 19 Maicol Santana; 72 Kelvin Silva; 40 Jose Trevizo	Catchers: 10 Deivis Colmenarez; 2 Jesus Hernandez; 6 Fernando Pena; 5 Andrés Rivero; Infielders: 26 Israel Alfonse; 1 Yoxander Benitez; 29 Omar Calcurian; 8 Albert Jimenez; 7 Yeison Oviedo; -- Jeremi Rodriguez; 17 Jonathan Valle; Outfielders: -- Ruben Bocio; 43 Ricardo Crespo; 3 Oscar Marin; 16 Angelo Ugueto; 21 Jose Valdez; 9 Leonardo Vargas; 23 Brandon Vasquez	Manager: Ian MacDonald; Coaches: Javier Francisco (fundamentals); Juan Parra (hitting); Darwin Peguero (pitching); 7-day injured list; * On San Francisco Giants 40-man roster; ~ Development list; # Rehab assignment; ∞ Reserve list; ‡ Restricted list; § Suspended list; † Temporarily inactive list; Roster updated November 3, 2026; Transactions; → More rosters: MiLB • Dominican Summer League; → San Francisco Giants minor league players
