= Camilo Doval =

Dominican baseball player (born 1997)

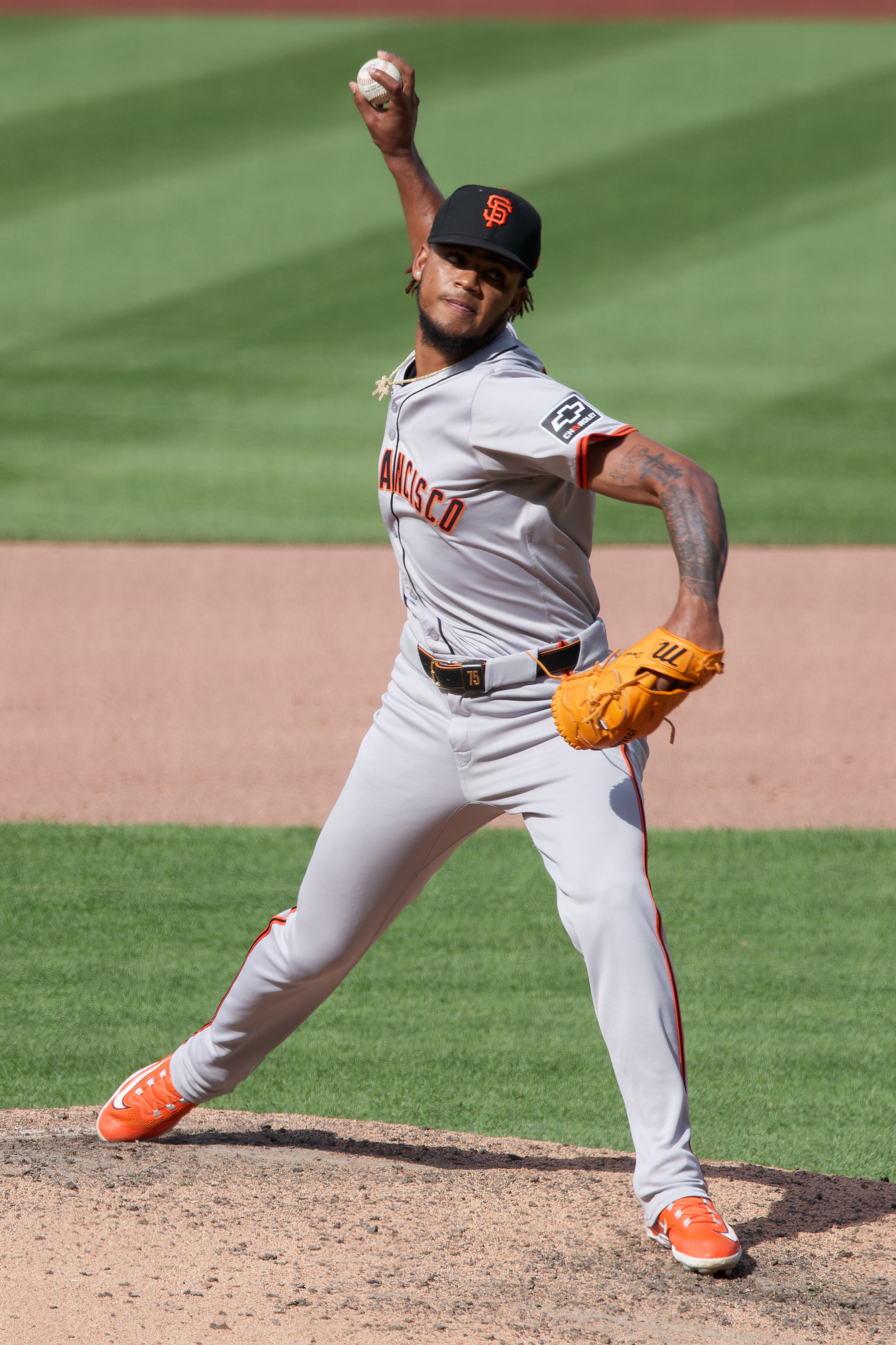
- Doval with the Giants in 2024

San Francisco Giants – No. 57
- Pitcher
- Born: July 4, 1997 (age 29); Yamasá, Dominican Republic
- Bats: Right Throws: Right

MLB debut
- April 18, 2021, for the San Francisco Giants

MLB statistics (through 2026 season)
- Win–loss record: 29–21
- Earned run average: 3.52
- Strikeouts: 420
- Saves: 109
- Stats at Baseball Reference

Teams
- San Francisco Giants (2021–2025); New York Yankees (2025–2026); Pittsburgh Pirates (2026); San Francisco Giants (2026–present)

Career highlights and awards
- All-Star (2023); NL saves leader (2023)
Medals
Men's baseball
Representing Dominican Republic
World Baseball Classic
Bronze medal – third place	2026 Miami	Team

Camilo Doval (born July 4, 1997) is a Dominican professional baseball pitcher for the San Francisco Giants of Major League Baseball (MLB). He has previously played in MLB for the New York Yankees and Pittsburgh Pirates. Doval signed with the Giants as an international free agent in 2015, and made his MLB debut with them in 2021. His fastball has reached 104.5 miles per hour (168.2 km/h).

== Early life ==
Camilo Doval was born on July 4, 1997, in Yamasá, Dominican Republic. His parents are Rosa, an elementary school teacher, and Sergio, a farmer, who have separated. He is the third of Rosa's four children, and has a combined 23 siblings and half-siblings, with whom he often communicates in a group chat on WhatsApp.

== Professional career ==
=== Minor leagues ===
Doval signed with the San Francisco Giants as an international free agent at 18 years of age in October 2015, for a signing bonus of $100,000. In 2016 as a pitcher he had a 2–0 win–loss record with one save and a 1.66 earned run average (ERA) for the Rookie-level DSL Giants in the Dominican Summer League. In 2017 he was 1–2 with one save and a 3.90 ERA, and had 14.2 strikeouts per 9 innings (2nd in the Arizona League) for the Rookie-level AZL Giants.

In 2018 he was 0–3 with a 3.06 ERA and had 11 saves (5th in the South Atlantic League) in 44 games (2nd), as he struck out 13.2 batters per 9 innings (3rd). Doval was a 2018 MiLB.com Organization All-Star, pitching for the Class A Augusta Greenjackets. In 2019 he was 3–5 with a 3.83 ERA in 45 relief appearances (3rd in the league) for the Class A-Advanced San Jose Giants, as he allowed only 6.6 hits per 9 innings and struck out 12.8 batters per 9 innings. He was a 2019 California League Mid-Season All-Star. Doval averaged 12.8 strikeouts per 9 innings in his first four minor league seasons.

Doval did not play in 2020 due to the cancellation of the Minor League Baseball season because of the COVID-19 pandemic. The Giants added him to their 40-man roster after the 2020 season.

He split 2021 between the Triple-A West Sacramento River Cats and the major league Giants. In July, pitching for the River Cats, Doval threw a pitch that was timed at 104.5 mph. For the 2021 season for the River Cats, he was 3–0 with one save and a 4.99 ERA, and averaged 12.9 strikeouts per 9 innings over 28 relief appearances covering 30.2 innings.

=== San Francisco Giants (2021–2025) ===
==== 2021 ====
On April 16, 2021, Doval was promoted to the major leagues for the first time. He made his MLB debut at 23 years of age on April 18, pitching a scoreless inning of relief with 2 strikeouts against the Miami Marlins.

In September 2021 he became the second Giants pitcher since Statcast started tracking in 2008 to throw a pitch faster than 102 mph, joining Brian Wilson. That same month, he became the youngest Giants pitcher, at 24 years and three months old, to record a save since Rod Beck in 1992. Doval was named the National League Reliever of the Month for September/October after throwing 14.1 scoreless innings. He struck out 20 and walked only three batters in those appearances, and by the end was serving as the team's closer.

In the 2021 regular season with the Giants, Doval was 5–1 with three saves and a 3.00 ERA. In 29 relief appearance he pitched 27 innings in which he struck out 37 batters, averaging 6.3 hits and 12.3 strikeouts per 9 innings with a 1.037 WHIP. His average fastball velocity of 98.6 mph was in the fastest 1% in MLB.

In the post-season, Doval threw a scoreless ninth inning against the Los Angeles Dodgers in a 4–0 win in Game 1 of the 2021 National League Division Series. He next pitched two perfect innings to save the Giants 1–0 win over the Dodgers in Game 3 of the NLDS. He became the first rookie to have a two-plus inning save in the postseason without allowing a baserunner since saves became an official statistic in 1969. It extended his scoreless streak to 19.1 innings, in which he allowed 8 hits, walked 3, and struck out 25.

==== 2022 ====
The 2022 season was Doval's first full season in the major leagues, and his first full season as the Giants' closer. He was 6–6 with 27 saves (6th in the NL) in 30 save opportunities, a 2.53 ERA in 68 relief appearances (6th) and 51 games finished (2nd), and in 67.2 innings struck out 80 batters. His average fastball velocity of 99 mph was in the fastest 1% in MLB.

He was again named the NL Reliever of the Month for September.

==== 2023 ====
Doval was named NL Reliever of the Month for May 2023, his third such career award. In 14 May appearances, he converted all 11 of his save opportunities over 13.2 innings while posting a 1.32 ERA and striking out 23.

On July 2, 2023, he was named to the NL All-Star team for the 2023 MLB All-Star Game. At the time of the selection, he led both leagues with 24 saves out of 26 opportunities and was 2-2 with a 1.89 ERA and 53 strikeouts over 38.0 innings pitched. Doval was the winning pitcher in the All-Star Game, becoming the eighth Giant to be the winning pitcher in the Midsummer Classic.

For the season, Doval recorded a league-high 39 saves and a 2.93 ERA in 67 2/3 innings pitched, with 87 strikeouts and 26 walks.

==== 2024 ====
In 2024, Doval appeared in 62 games for San Francisco, posting a 4.88 ERA with 78 strikeouts and 23 saves across 59 innings pitched. He struggled after the All-Star break, recording a 6.43 ERA in seven outings, while averaging 5.9 walks per nine innings on the season with five blown saves in 27 opportunities, and was optioned to Triple-A Sacramento on August 9, 2024. After the minimum 15-day period, Doval returned to the Giants on August 24, in a setup role pitching in the seventh or eighth inning.

==== 2025 ====
Doval started the 2025 season in a setup role for closer Ryan Walker. In late May, Doval reclaimed his closer role after Walker struggled. On June 5, 2025, against the San Diego Padres, Doval recorded his 100th career save as a closing pitcher as the Giants defeated the Padres 3–2. He made 47 appearances out of the bullpen for San Francisco, compiling a 4-2 record and 3.09 ERA with 50 strikeouts and 15 saves across 46 2/3 innings pitched.

=== New York Yankees ===
On July 31, 2025, the Giants traded Doval to the New York Yankees in exchange for Trystan Vrieling, Jesús Rodríguez, Parks Harber and Carlos De La Rosa.

=== Pittsburgh Pirates ===
On August 1, 2026, the Yankees traded Doval to the Pittsburgh Pirates in exchange for Omar Alfonzo and Luis Cruz. In 20 appearances for Pittsburgh, he logged an 0–1 record and 3.79 ERA with 23 strikeouts over 19 innings of work. Doval was designated for assignment by the Pirates on September 22.

=== San Francisco Giants (second stint) ===
On September 24, 2026, Doval was claimed off of waivers by the San Francisco Giants. On November 20, Doval signed a one-year, $6.3 million deal, avoiding arbitration in the process.

== Pitching style ==
His cutter has reached 104.5 miles per hour (168.2 km/h). He also throws a high-80s hard slider and an occasional change-up. In the middle of the 2022 season, Doval added a sinker averaging in the high-90s to his pitch repotoire. He throws from a very low, sidearm arm slot. He relied primarily on his 88 mph slider (against which batters hit .154), 99 mph cutter, and 98 mph sinker.

Unlike the name suggests, Doval's cutter moves to his arm side.

== Personal life ==
Doval has a son, born in 2020.
