= San Francisco Giants =

Major League Baseball franchise

- 2026 San Francisco Giants season

Logo	Cap insignia
- Established in 1883; Based in San Francisco since 1958

Major league affiliations
- National League (1883–present); West Division (1969–present)

Current uniform
- Retired numbers: NY; NY; 3; 4; 11; 20; 21; 22; 24; 25; 27; 30; 36; 44; 42

Colors
- Black, orange, metallic gold, cream

Name
- San Francisco Giants (1958–present); New York Giants (1885–1957); New York Gothams (1883–1884)

Nicknames
- The G-Men; Los Gigantes; The Orange and Black

Ballpark
- Oracle Park (2000–present); Candlestick Park (1960–1999); Seals Stadium (1958–1959); Hilltop Park (1911); Polo Grounds III (1891–1957); Polo Grounds II (1889–1890); St. George Cricket Grounds (1889); Oakland Park (1889); Polo Grounds I (1883–1888)

Major league titles
- World Series titles (8): 1905; 1921; 1922; 1933; 1954; 2010; 2012; 2014
- NL pennants (23): 1888; 1889; 1904; 1905; 1911; 1912; 1913; 1917; 1921; 1922; 1923; 1924; 1933; 1936; 1937; 1951; 1954; 1962; 1989; 2002; 2010; 2012; 2014
- West division titles (9): 1971; 1987; 1989; 1997; 2000; 2003; 2010; 2012; 2021
- Temple Cup (1): 1894
- Pre-modern World Series (2): 1888; 1889
- Wild card berths (3): 2002; 2014; 2016

Front office
- Principal owners: Charles B. Johnson; Greg E. Johnson (Chairman)
- President: Larry Baer
- President of baseball operations: Buster Posey
- General manager: Zack Minasian
- Manager: Tony Vitello
- Website: mlb.com/giants

The San Francisco Giants are an American professional baseball team based in San Francisco. The Giants compete in Major League Baseball (MLB) as a member club of the National League (NL) West Division. Founded in 1883 as the New York Gothams, the team was renamed the New York Giants three years later, eventually relocating from New York City to San Francisco in 1958. The Giants play their home games at Oracle Park in San Francisco.

The franchise is one of the oldest and most successful in professional baseball, with more wins than any other franchise in Major League Baseball history. The team was the first major-league organization based in New York City, most memorably playing home games at several iterations of the Polo Grounds. The Giants have played in the World Series 20 times and have won 23 National League pennants; they held the record for the most NL pennants from 2012 to 2020. Their eight World Series championships are the third-most in the NL, and are the sixth-most of any franchise.

The franchise won 17 pennants and five World Series championships while in New York, led by managers John McGraw, Bill Terry, and Leo Durocher. New York-era star players including Christy Mathewson, Carl Hubbell, Mel Ott, and Willie Mays join 63 other Giants in the Baseball Hall of Fame, the most of any franchise. The Giants' rivalry with the Los Angeles Dodgers, one of the longest-standing and most famed rivalries in American sports, began in New York and continued when both teams relocated to California in 1958.

Despite the efforts of Mays and Barry Bonds, regarded as two of baseball's all-time best players, the Giants endured a 56-year championship drought following the move west, a stretch that included three World Series losses. The drought finally ended in the early 2010s; under manager Bruce Bochy, the Giants embraced sabermetrics and eventually formed a baseball dynasty that saw them win the World Series in 2010, 2012, and 2014, making the Giants the second team in NL history to win three championships in five years.

Through 2025, the franchise's all-time record is 11,622–10,100–163 (.535). Since moving to San Francisco in 1958, the Giants have an overall win–loss record of 5,555–5,202–6 (.517) through the end of 2025.

== History ==
=== New York Giants ===
The Giants originated in New York City as the New York Gothams in 1883, and were known as the New York Giants from 1885 until the team relocated to San Francisco after the 1957 season. During most of their 75 seasons in New York City, the Giants played home games at various incarnations of the Polo Grounds in Upper Manhattan.

Numerous inductees of the National Baseball Hall of Fame and Museum played for the New York Giants, including John McGraw, Christy Mathewson, Mel Ott, Bill Terry, Willie Mays, Monte Irvin, and Travis Jackson. During the club's tenure in New York, they produced five of the franchise's eight World Series wins (1905, 1921, 1922, 1933, 1954) and 17 of its 23 National League pennants. Famous moments in the Giants' New York history include the 1922 World Series, in which the Giants swept the Yankees in four games, the 1951 home run by New York Giants outfielder and third baseman Bobby Thomson known as the "Shot Heard 'Round the World", and the defensive feat by Mays during Game 1 of the 1954 World Series known as "the Catch".

The Giants had intense rivalries with their fellow New York teams, the New York Yankees and the Brooklyn Dodgers. The Giants faced the Yankees in six World Series and played the league rival Dodgers multiple times per season. Games between any two of these three teams were known collectively as the Subway Series. The Dodgers-Giants rivalry continues, as both teams moved to California after the 1957 season, with the Dodgers relocating to Los Angeles. The New York Giants of the National Football League (NFL) are named after the team.

=== San Francisco Giants ===
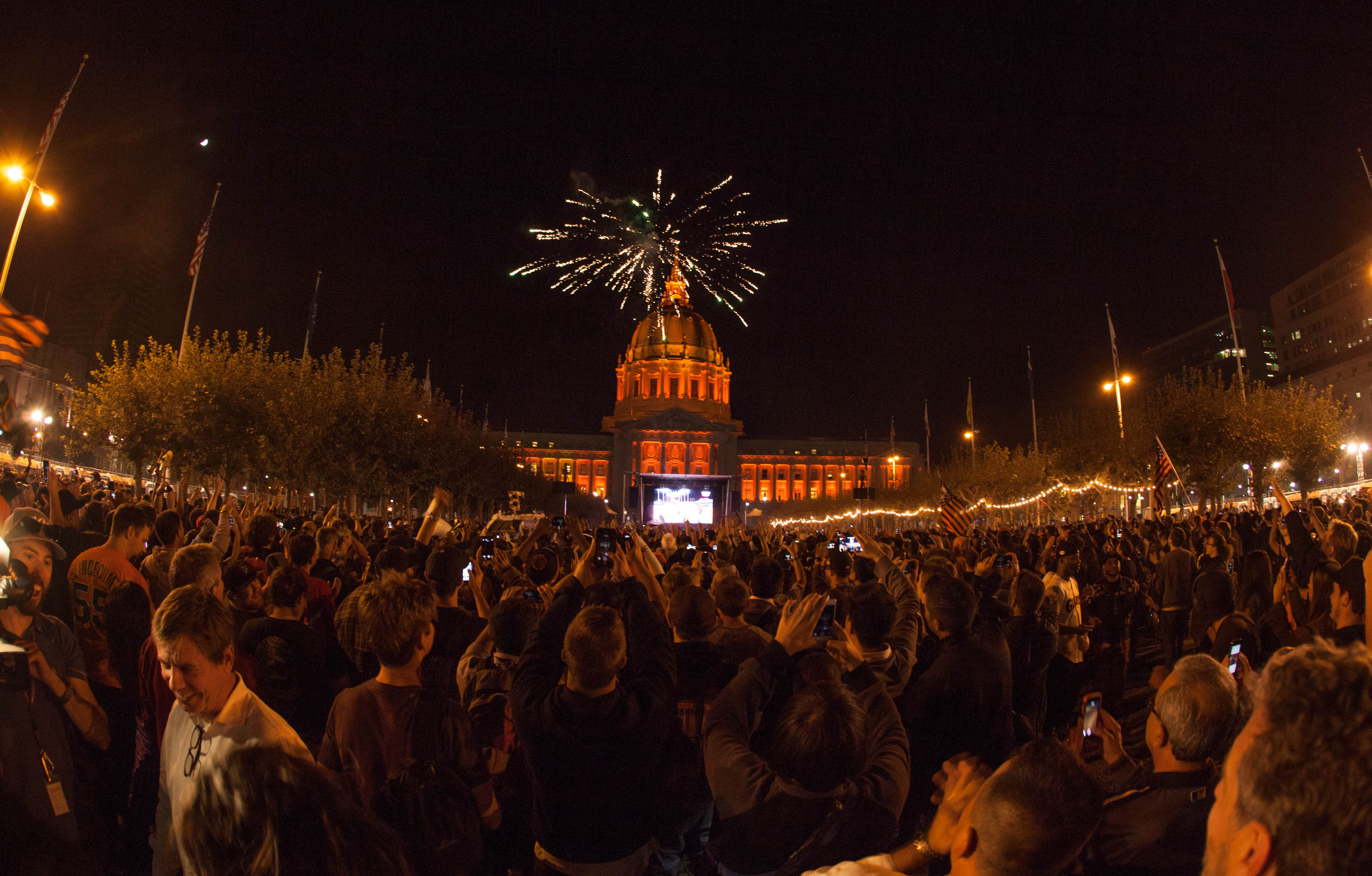
Fans celebrating the Giants' 2014 World Series victory at San Francisco City Hall

The Giants, along with their rival Los Angeles Dodgers, became the first Major League Baseball teams to play on the West Coast. On April 15, 1958, the Giants played their first game in San Francisco, defeating the former Brooklyn and now Los Angeles Dodgers, 8–0. The Giants played for two seasons at Seals Stadium (from 1931 to 1957, the stadium was the home of the PCL's San Francisco Seals) before moving to Candlestick Park in 1960. The Giants played at Candlestick Park until 1999, before opening Pacific Bell Park (now known as Oracle Park) in 2000, where the Giants currently play.

The Giants struggled to sustain consistent success in their first 50 years in San Francisco. They made nine playoff appearances and won three NL pennants between 1958 and 2009. The Giants lost the 1962 World Series in seven games to the New York Yankees. The Giants were swept in the 1989 World Series by their cross-Bay rival Oakland Athletics, a series best known for the 1989 Loma Prieta earthquake, which caused a 10-day delay between Games 2 and 3. The Giants also lost the 2002 World Series to the Anaheim Angels. One of the team's biggest highlights during this time was the 2001 season, in which outfielder Barry Bonds hit 73 home runs, breaking the record for most home runs in a season. In 2007, Bonds would surpass Hank Aaron's career record of 755 home runs. Bonds finished his career with 762 home runs (586 hit with the Giants), which is still the MLB record.

The Giants won three World Series championships in 2010, 2012, and 2014, giving the team eight total World Series titles, including the five won as the New York Giants when they still played in New York.

Players inducted into the National Baseball Hall of Fame and Museum as members of the San Francisco Giants include CF Willie Mays, 1B Orlando Cepeda, P Juan Marichal, 1B Willie McCovey, and P Gaylord Perry. In a 2026 survey measuring the percentage of spectators wearing team merchandise at MLB teams, San Francisco Giants fans ranked fifth among MLB fanbases, with 40.7% of fans observed wearing team merchandise.

== Uniforms ==
=== 1958–1972 ===
Upon moving to San Francisco, the Giants kept the same uniform they wore in New York, save for two changes. The cap logo now had an interlocking "SF" in orange, while the road uniform now featured "San Francisco" in black block letters with orange trim. Neckline, pants and sleeves feature thin black and orange stripes.

=== 1973–1976 ===
Changing to double-knit polyester, the Giants made a few noticeable changes to their uniform. The color scheme on the letters was changed to orange with black trim, and player names were added on the back. The cap logo remained the same.

=== 1977–1982 ===
For the 1977 season, the Giants switched to pullover uniforms. "Giants" on the home uniform was changed from serifed block lettering to cursive script, and the color scheme returned to black with orange trim. The road uniform became orange, with letters in black with white trim. Neck and sleeve stripes are in black, orange and white. Both uniforms received chest numbers. The standard cap was changed to feature an orange brim.

The 1978 season saw the Giants add a black alternate uniform, an inverse of their road orange uniform. All three uniforms now featured the "Giants" script previously exclusive to the home uniform.

=== 1983–1993 ===
Before the 1983 season, the Giants returned to a traditional buttoned uniform designed by Sidjakov Berman & Gomez. This design returned to the classic look they wore early in their San Francisco tenure, but with a few exceptions. The lettering became more rounded (save for the player's name), the neck stripes were removed, and the interlocking "SF" and black piping was added on the road gray uniform. The caps returned to an all-black design.

=== 1994–1999 ===
In 1994, the Giants made a few changes to their uniform. The road uniform reverted to "San Francisco" in front and removed the piping. The front of both uniforms returned to stylized block letters with pointed edges, but kept the rounded numbers. The "SF" on the cap was also changed to reflect the lettering change.

=== 2000–present ===
Coinciding with the move to Oracle Park (then Pacific Bell Park) in 2000, the Giants unveiled new uniforms which were aesthetically close to the style they originally wore in their early years. On each uniform, numbers returned to a block letter style.

==== Home ====
The base of the home uniform was changed to cream. The "Giants" wordmark kept the same stylized block letter treatment but the arrangement was changed from a vertical to a radial arch. Neck stripes also returned with this uniform. Gold drop shadows were also added. A sleeve patch containing the team logo and the words "San Francisco Baseball Club" was also featured.

==== Road ====
The gray road uniform returned to the classic "San Francisco" wordmark used in the 1960s, though in 2005 gold drop shadows were also added. This uniform was then tweaked to include black piping in 2012. Two sleeve patches were used. Between 2000 and 2010, the patch featured "SF" in orange letters in front of a baseball, with the full name added within a black circle. In 2011, this was changed to the sleeve patch used on the home uniform. Until 2020, only the road uniform featured player names; since 2021, all Giants uniforms have player names on the back.

==== Black alternate ====
In 2001, the Giants added a road and home alternate black uniform. Each uniform shared the same design as their home and road counterparts, with the exception of the road alternate receiving gold drop shadows. The home design was dropped after only one season, and the road version was retired the following year. Both sets were worn with an all-black cap but with the squatchee in black (the primary cap has an orange squatchee) and the "SF" wordmark changed to black with orange trim.

In 2015, the Giants unveiled a new black alternate uniform to be used on select Saturday home games. This set has the interlocking "SF" in front along with orange piping and a new sleeve patch containing the Golden Gate Bridge atop the "Giants" wordmark. Initially, the letters were in black with orange trim, but this was changed to orange with black trim and orange drop shadows. In 2025, the Giants began wearing this uniform on select road games as well.

In 2026, the Giants updated their black uniform, incorporating Latin American-inspired imagery and gray accents. The chest wordmark featured the Spanish translation of the team name ("Gigantes") with the font largely based on the home uniforms they wore from 1983 to 1993. Both the wordmark, sleeve stripes and numbers incorporated a step fret design. A new sleeve patch incorporated a diamond featuring the full Spanish-oriented team name, step fret patterns and a crossed pair of baseball bats. A special black cap was worn with this uniform, featuring a gray panel with the interlocking "SF" accented by a step fret in the bottom. This uniform would be worn during Saturday home games.

==== Orange alternate ====
Before the 2010 season, the Giants unveiled a new orange alternate uniform to be used on Friday home games. Initially, this design was similar to the home uniform save for a trim change to cream, but in 2011, the sleeve patch was changed to the one previously used on the team's road uniform. In 2014, the orange alternate were tweaked slightly, adding black piping and a new sleeve patch featuring the interlocking "SF" logo, and returning to the script "Giants" lettering previously used in the late 1970s. This design is usually paired with a black cap with orange brim featuring the "SF" logo.

==== Road alternate ====
Between 2012 and 2019, the Giants wore a second gray road uniform. This design was similar to the primary roads, but with the "SF" in place of the city name (a nod to the 1983–1993 road uniforms).

==== City Connect ====
In 2021, Major League Baseball and Nike introduced the "City Connect" program, with teams wearing special uniforms that reflect the pride and personality of their community. The Giants' version is a white base with orange accents, featuring the stylized "G" in an orange/white gradient. The gradient represents the San Francisco fog that envelopes the Bay Area many months per year. An orange silhouette of the Golden Gate Bridge is printed on the sleeves. The uniform is paired with an all-orange cap with the "SF" in orange with white trim. The uniforms are usually worn on Tuesday home games. In 2025, Nike announced they were making changes the "City Connect" program, the Giants are confirmed to be changing their "City Connect" uniform for the 2025 Major League Baseball season.

On April 8th, 2025, the Giants unveiled their City Connect 2.0s. They are called a "remix". The jerseys are a dark gray/black, and feature "Giants" in a script wordmark outlined in a purple and orange gradient. The sleeves will feature a special glove design which says "San Francisco Giants Est 1958” in a style which is very reminiscent of San Francisco rock music posters from the 1960s. Also on the jersey are the waves which the team is calling "sound waves" which are "pressed like grooves on vinyl" that permeate the jersey. Front jersey numbers are orange, in a whimsical font. The hat highlights the "SF" in the same font, with a gradient bill. The pants are white with gradient piping.

== Rivalries ==
The Giants' rivalry with the Los Angeles Dodgers dates back to when the two teams were based in New York, as does their rivalry with the New York Yankees. The Dodger and Giants rivalry is one of the longest and fiercest rivalries in sports history. Their rivalry with the Oakland Athletics (now Athletics baseball club since leaving Oakland) dates back to when the Giants were in New York and the A's were in Philadelphia and played each other in the 1905, 1911, & 1913 World Series, and was renewed in 1968 when the A's moved from Kansas City and the teams again played each other in the earthquake-interrupted 1989 Bay Bridge World Series. The Giants share a high divisional rivalry with fellow National League West member Arizona Diamondbacks. The 2010 NLCS inaugurated a Giants rivalry with the Philadelphia Phillies after confrontations between Jonathan Sánchez and Chase Utley, and between Ramón Ramírez and Shane Victorino. However, with the Philadelphia Phillies dropping off as one of the premier teams of the National League, this rivalry has died down since 2010 and 2011. Another rivalry that has intensified recently is with the St. Louis Cardinals, whom the team has faced 4 times in the NLCS.

The rivalry between the New York Giants and Chicago Cubs in the early 20th century was once regarded as one of the most heated in baseball, with Merkle's Boner leading to a 1908 season-ending matchup in New York of particular note. That historical rivalry was revisited when the Giants beat the Cubs in the 1989 National League Championship Series, in their tiebreaker game in Chicago at the end of the 1998 season, on June 6, 2012, in a "Turn Back The Century" game in which both teams wore replica 1912 uniforms, and in the 2016 National League Division Series in which the Cubs won.

=== Los Angeles Dodgers ===
The Giants-Dodgers rivalry is one of the longest-standing rivalries in team sports.

The Giants-Dodgers feud began in the late 19th century when both clubs were based in New York City, with the Dodgers based in Brooklyn and the Giants playing at the Polo Grounds in upper Manhattan. After the 1957 season, Dodgers owner Walter O'Malley decided to move the team to Los Angeles primarily for financial reasons. Along the way, he managed to convince Giants owner Horace Stoneham (who was considering moving his team to Minnesota) to preserve the rivalry by taking his team to San Francisco as well. New York baseball fans were stunned and heartbroken by the move. Given that the cities of Los Angeles and San Francisco have long been competitors in economic, cultural and political arenas, their new California venues became fertile ground for transplantation of the ancient rivalry. In the wake of the Giants' and Dodgers' leaving New York, a new ballclub was born in 1962 in Queens: The New York Mets. The team's colors (blue and orange) were an homage to the recently departed teams.

Both teams' having endured for over a century while leaping across an entire continent, as well as the rivalry's growth from cross-city to cross-state, have led to its being considered one of the greatest in sports history.

The Giants-Dodgers rivalry has seen both teams enjoy periods of success at the expense of the other. While the Giants have more total wins and head-to-head wins in their overall franchise histories, the Dodgers have more total wins and head-to-head wins since the two teams moved to California in 1958. The Dodgers have also won the National League West 14 more times than the Giants since the start of division play in 1969. Both teams have made the postseason as a National League wild card three times. The Giants won their first world championship in California in 2010, while the Dodgers won their most recent world title in 2025. As of the end of the 2025 baseball season, the Los Angeles Dodgers lead the San Francisco Giants in California World Series triumphs, 8–3, whereas in 20th-century New York, the Giants led the Dodgers in World Series championships, 5–1. Overall, the Dodgers lead the Giants 9-8 in total World Series championships.

=== Oakland Athletics ===
A geographic rivalry with the cross-Bay American League Athletics greatly increased with the 1989 World Series, nicknamed the "Battle of the Bay", which Oakland swept (and which was interrupted by the Loma Prieta earthquake moments before the scheduled start of Game 3 in San Francisco). This dates back to when the Giants and Athletics were rivals, when the Giants were in New York and the Athletics in Philadelphia. They met in the 1905, 1911, and 1913 World Series. In addition, the introduction of interleague play in 1997 has pitted the two teams against each other for usually six games every season since 1997, three in each city (but only four in 2013, two in each city). Before 1997, they played each other only in Cactus League spring training. Their interleague play wins and losses (63–57 in favor of the A's) have been fairly evenly divided despite differences in league, style of play, stadium, payroll, fan base stereotypes, media coverage and World Series records, all of which have heightened the rivalry in recent years. The intensity of the rivalry and how it is understood varies among Bay Area fans. A's fans generally view the Giants as a hated rival, while Giants fans generally view the A's as a friendly rival much lower on the scale. This is most likely due to the A's lack of a historical rival, while the Giants have their heated rivalry with the Dodgers. Some Bay Area fans are fans of both teams. The "split hats" that feature the logos of both teams best embodies the shared fan base. Other Bay Area fans view the competition between the two teams as a "friendly rivalry", with little actual hatred compared to similar ones such as the Subway Series (New York Mets vs. New York Yankees), the Crosstown Classic (Chicago Cubs vs. Chicago White Sox) and the Freeway Series (Los Angeles Dodgers vs. Los Angeles Angels).

The Giants and A's enjoyed a limited rivalry at the start of the 20th century before the Yankees began to dominate after the acquisition of Babe Ruth in 1920, when the Giants were in New York and the A's were in Philadelphia. The teams were managed by legendary leaders John McGraw and Connie Mack, who were considered not only friendly rivals but the premier managers during that era, especially in view of their longevity (Mack for 50 years, McGraw for 30) since both were majority owners. Each team played in five of the first 15 World Series (tying them with the Red Sox and Cubs for most World Series appearances during that time period). As the New York Giants and the Philadelphia A's, they met in three World Series, with the Giants winning in 1905 and the A's in 1911 & 1913. After becoming the San Francisco Giants and Oakland A's, they met in a fourth Series in 1989 resulting in the A's last world championship (as of 2024).

=== New York Yankees ===
Though in different leagues, the Giants have also been historical rivals of the Yankees, starting in New York before the Giants moved to the West Coast. Before the institution of interleague play in 1997, the two teams had little opportunity to play each other except in seven World Series: 1921, 1922, 1923, 1936, 1937, 1951 and 1962, the Yankees winning last five of the seven Series. The teams have met five times in regular season interleague play: In 2002 at the old Yankee Stadium, in 2007 at Oracle Park (then known as AT&T Park), in 2013, 2016, and 2023 at the current Yankee Stadium, and in 2019 at Oracle Park. The teams' next regular season meetings will occur yearly, with the advent of the balanced schedule format introduced in 2023.

In his July 4, 1939, farewell speech ending with the renowned "Today, I consider myself the luckiest man on the face of the earth", Yankee slugger Lou Gehrig, who played in 2,130 consecutive games, declared that the Giants were a team he "would give his right arm to beat, and vice versa".

== Baseball Hall of Famers ==
As of 2025, the National Baseball Hall of Fame and Museum has inducted 67 representatives of the Giants (56 players and 11 managers) into the Hall of Fame, more than any other team in the history of baseball.

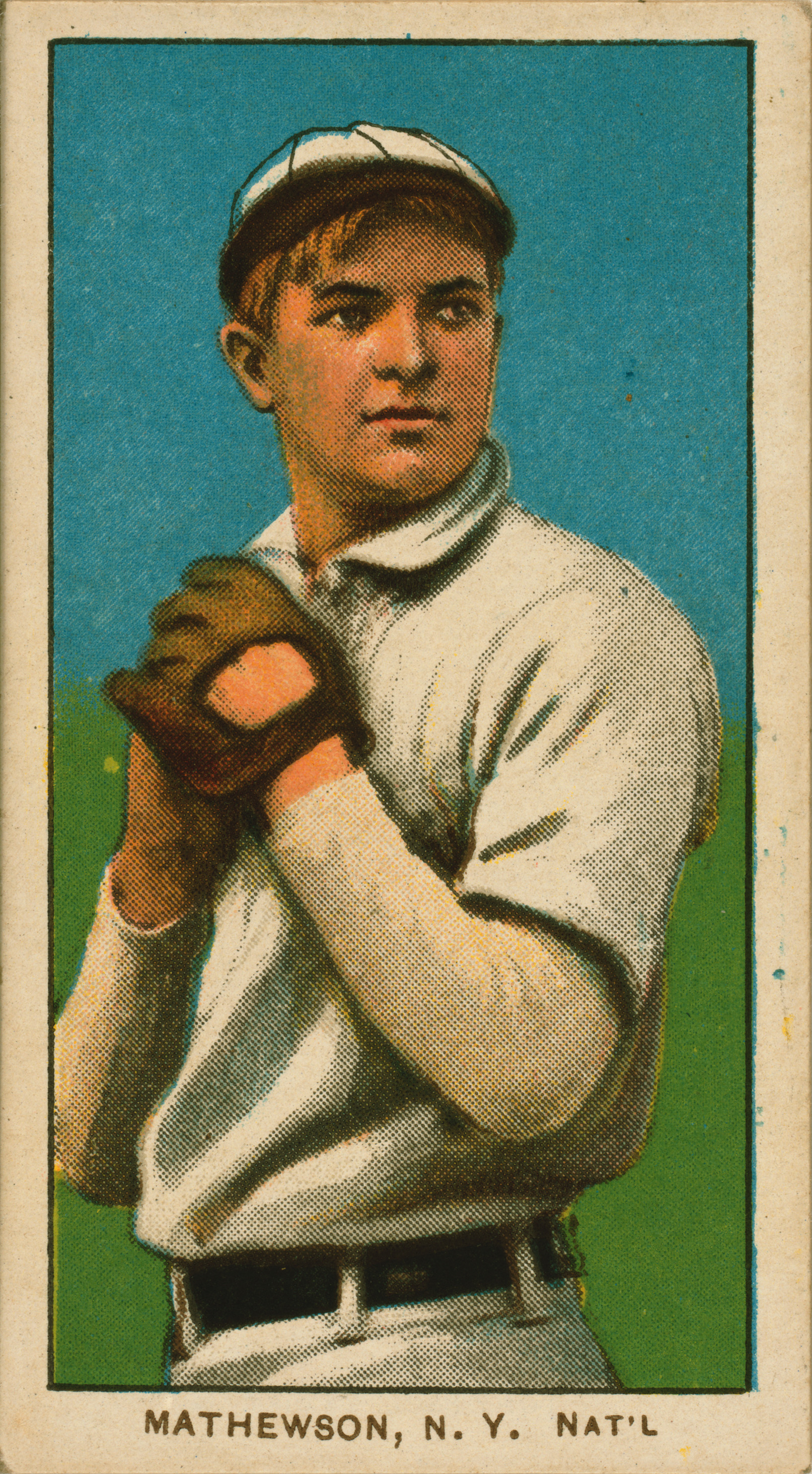
Christy Mathewson

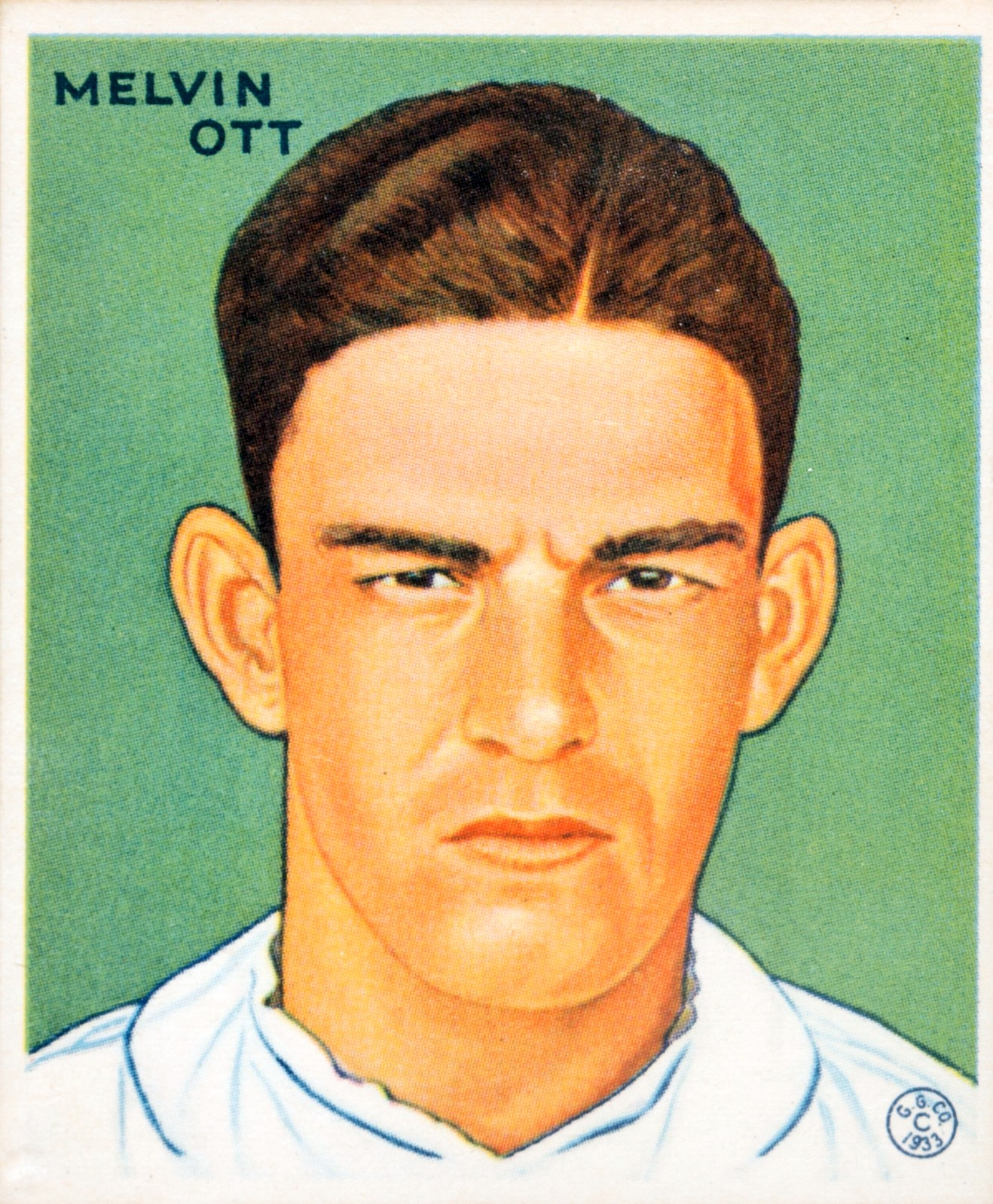
Mel Ott

San Francisco Giants Hall of Famers
Affiliation according to the National Baseball Hall of Fame and Museum
New York Gothams/Giants

Dave Bancroft
Jake Beckley
Roger Bresnahan *
Dan Brouthers
Jesse Burkett
**Roger Connor** *
**George Davis** *
Leo Durocher

**Buck Ewing** *
Frankie Frisch
Burleigh Grimes
Gabby Hartnett
Rogers Hornsby
Waite Hoyt
**Carl Hubbell** *
**Monte Irvin**
**Travis Jackson** *

**Tim Keefe** *
Willie Keeler
**George Kelly** *
King Kelly
Tony Lazzeri
**Freddie Lindstrom** *
Ernie Lombardi
**Rube Marquard** *
**Christy Mathewson** *

**Joe McGinnity** *
**John McGraw** *
Joe Medwick
Johnny Mize
Hank O'Day
**Jim O'Rourke** *
**Mel Ott** *
Edd Roush
Amos Rusie *

Ray Schalk
Red Schoendienst
**Bill Terry** *
John Montgomery Ward *
**Mickey Welch** *
**Hoyt Wilhelm**
Hack Wilson
**Ross Youngs** *

San Francisco Giants

Carlos Beltrán
Steve Carlton
Gary Carter

**Orlando Cepeda** *
Goose Gossage
Randy Johnson

**Jeff Kent** *
**Juan Marichal** *
**Willie Mays** *

**Willie McCovey** *
Joe Morgan
**Gaylord Perry** *

Frank Robinson
Duke Snider
Warren Spahn

- Players and managers listed in **bold** are depicted on their Hall of Fame plaques wearing a Giants or Gothams cap insignia.
- * New York / San Francisco Giants listed as primary team according to the Hall of Fame

=== Ford C. Frick Award recipients ===
San Francisco Giants Ford C. Frick Award recipients
Affiliation according to the National Baseball Hall of Fame and Museum

Ernie Harwell
**Russ Hodges**

Tim McCarver
Al Michaels

**Jon Miller**
Lindsey Nelson

**Lon Simmons**

- **Names in bold** received the award based primarily on their work as broadcasters for the Giants.
- * Played as Giants

=== Other ===
The following inducted members of the Hall of Fame played or managed for the Giants, but either played for the Giants and were inducted as a manager having never managed the Giants, or managed the Giants and were inducted as a player having never played for the Giants:

- Cap Anson – inducted as player, managed Giants in 1898.
- Hughie Jennings – inducted as player, managed Giants from 1924 to 1925.
- Bill McKechnie – inducted as manager, played for Giants in 1916.
- Frank Robinson – inducted as player, managed Giants from 1981 to 1984.
- Casey Stengel – inducted as manager, played for Giants from 1921 to 1923.

Broadcasters Russ Hodges, Lon Simmons, and Jon Miller are permanently honored in the Hall's "Scribes & Mikemen" exhibit as a result of winning the Ford C. Frick Award in 1980, 2004, and 2010 respectively. As with all Frick Award winners, none are officially recognized as an inducted member of the Hall of Fame.

=== Bay Area Sports Hall of Famers ===
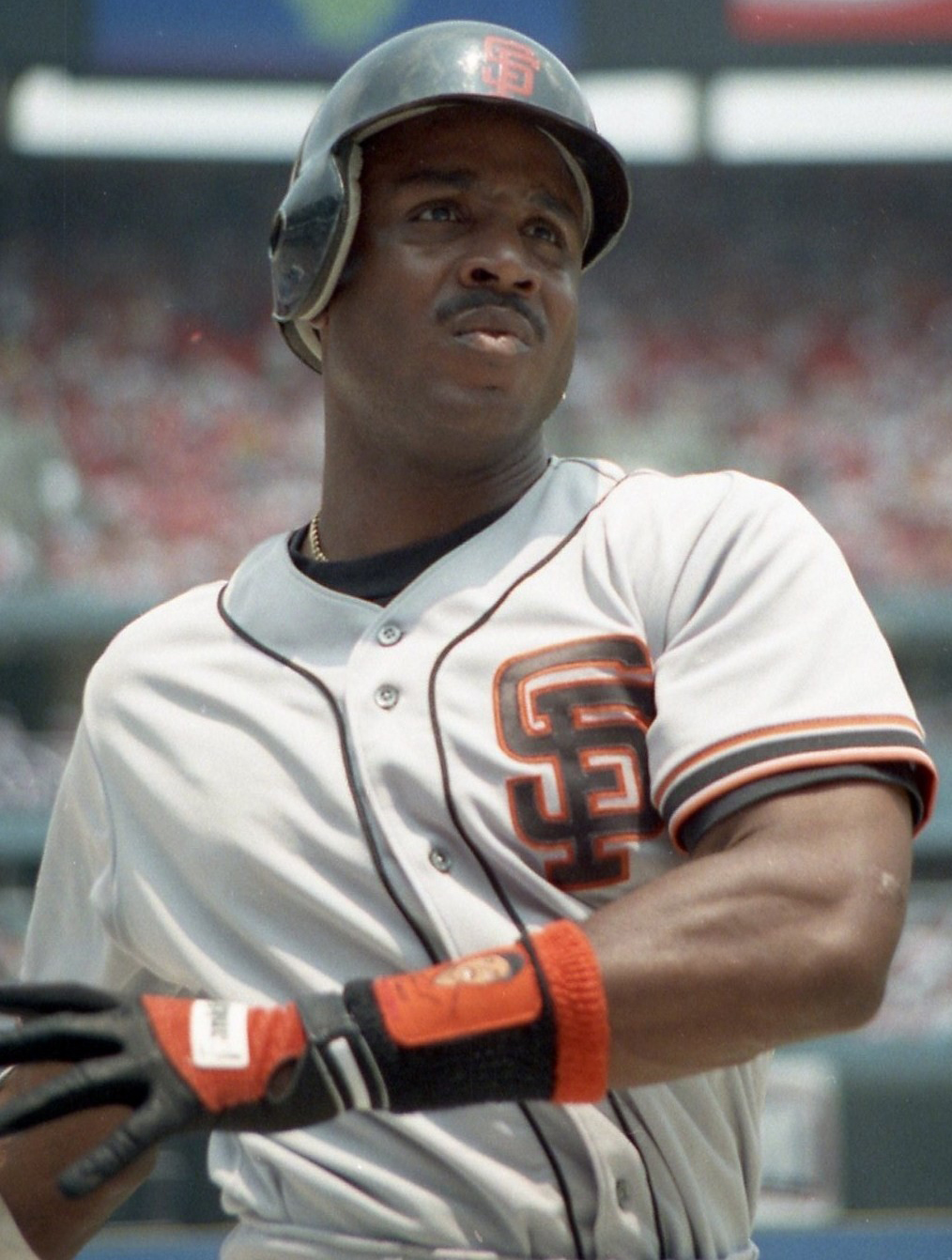
Barry Bonds

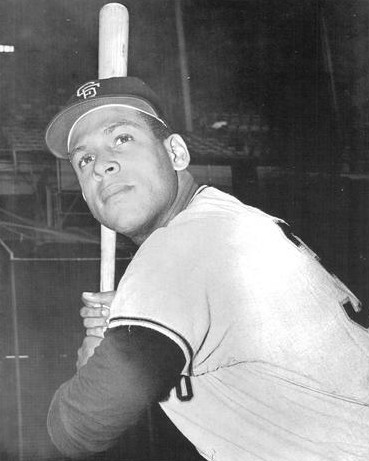
Orlando Cepeda

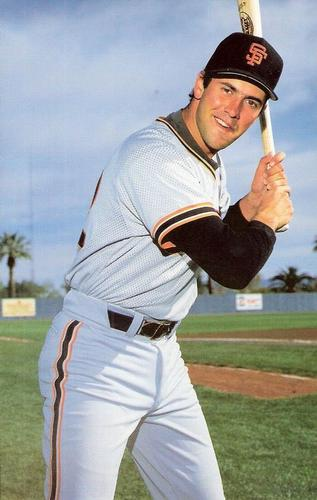
Will Clark

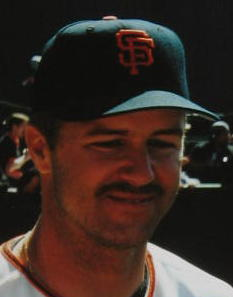
Jeff Kent

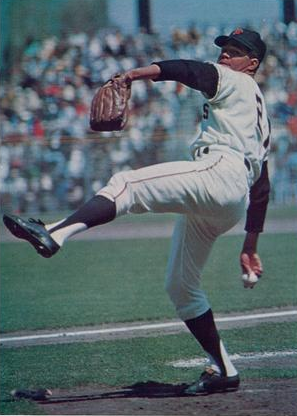
Juan Marichal

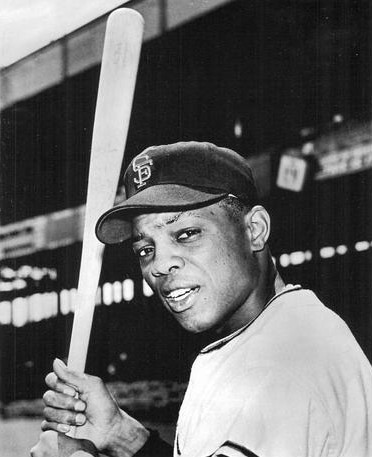
Willie Mays

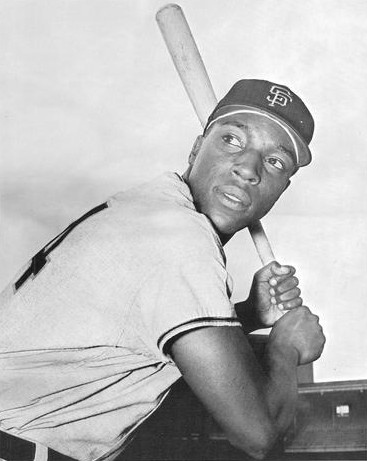
Willie McCovey

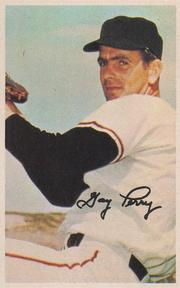
Gaylord Perry

**Giants in the Bay Area Sports Hall of Fame**
No.	Name	Position	Tenure	Notes
—	Bob Lurie	Owner	1976–1993	Born in San Francisco
—	Peter Magowan	Owner/President	1993–2008	Attended Stanford University
1, 18	Bill Rigney	IF; Manager	1946–1953; 1956–1960, 1976	Born and raised in Alameda
2	Dick Bartell	SS	1935–1938; 1941–1943, 1946	Grew up in Alameda
4	Ernie Lombardi	C	1943–1947	Elected mainly on his performance with Cincinnati Reds, grew up in Oakland
6	Tony Lazzeri	2B	1939	Elected mainly on his performance with New York Yankees, born and raised in San Francisco
8	Joe Morgan	2B	1981–1982	Elected mainly on his performance with Cincinnati Reds, raised in Oakland
9, 10, 60	Matt Williams	3B	1987–1996	
12	Dusty Baker	OF; Manager	1984; 1993–2002	
14	Vida Blue	P	1978–1981; 1985–1986	Elected mainly on his performance with Oakland A's
15	Bruce Bochy	Manager	2007–2019	Managed 2010, 2012, 2014 World Series winners
16	Lefty O'Doul	LF	1928; 1933–1934	Born in San Francisco
18, 43	Matt Cain	P	2005–2017	Pitched a perfect game in 2012
19, 33	Dave Righetti	P Coach	1991–1993; 2000–2017	Born and raised in San Jose
20	Frank Robinson	Manager	1981–1984	Elected mainly on his performance with Cincinnati Reds and Baltimore Orioles
21	Jeff Kent	2B	1997–2002	Attended UC Berkeley
22	Will Clark	1B	1986–1993	
24	Willie Mays	CF	1951–1952; 1954–1972	
25	Barry Bonds	LF	1993–2007	Grew up in San Carlos
27	Juan Marichal	P	1960–1973	
30	Orlando Cepeda	1B	1958–1966	
36	Gaylord Perry	P	1962–1971	
43	Dave Dravecky	P	1987–1989	
44	Willie McCovey	1B	1959–1973; 1977–1980	

=== Wall of Famers ===
The Giants Wall of Fame recognizes retired players whose records stand highest among their teammates on the basis of longevity and achievements.

Those honored have played a minimum of nine seasons for the San Francisco Giants, five seasons with at least one All-Star selection as a Giant, or won three World Series championships as a Giant.

Key
Year	Year inducted
**Bold**	Member of the Baseball Hall of Fame
†	Member of the Baseball Hall of Fame as a Giant

**San Francisco Giants Wall of Fame**
Year	No.	Name	Position(s)	Tenure
2008	23, 49	Felipe Alou	OF/1B; Manager	1958–1963; 2003–2006
2008	46	Gary Lavelle	P	1974–1984
2008	33	Jim Barr	P	1971–1978; 1982–1983
2008	10	Johnnie LeMaster	SS	1975–1985
2008	14, 24	**Willie Mays**^{†}	CF	1951–1952, 1954–1972
2008	47	Rod Beck	P	1991–1997
2008	00, 20, 26	Jeffrey Leonard	LF	1981–1988
2008	14	Vida Blue	P	1978–1981; 1985–1986
2008	8, 17, 19	Kirt Manwaring	C	1987–1996
2008	44	**Willie McCovey**^{†}	1B	1959–1973; 1977–1980
2008	42	Bobby Bolin	P	1961–1969
2008	27	**Juan Marichal**^{†}	P	1960–1973
2008	49	Jeff Brantley	P	1988–1993
2008	15, 22	Jack Clark	RF/1B	1975–1984
2008	29, 40	Mike McCormick	P	1956–1962; 1967–1970
2008	15, 19	Bob Brenly	C	1981–1988; 1989
2008	32, 33, 40, 51	John Burkett	P	1987; 1990–1994
2008	23, 37	Stu Miller	P	1957–1962
2008	25	Bobby Bonds	RF	1968–1974
2008	30	**Orlando Cepeda**^{†}	1B	1958–1966
2008	17, 39	Randy Moffitt	P	1972–1981
2008	38, 41	Greg Minton	P	1975–1987
2008	7, 9	Kevin Mitchell	LF	1987–1991
2008	22	Will Clark	1B	1986–1993
2008	34, 39	Mike Krukow	P	1983–1989
2008	12	Jim Davenport	3B; Manager	1958–1970; 1985
2008	26, 50	John Montefusco	P	1974–1980
2008	30, 33	Chili Davis	OF	1981–1987
2008	9, 10, 60	Matt Williams	3B	1987–1996
2008	31	Robb Nen	P	1998–2002
2008	2	Dick Dietz	C	1966–1971
2008	22, 28, 35, 36	**Gaylord Perry**^{†}	P	1962–1971
2008	41	Darrell Evans	3B/1B	1976–1983
2008	16	Jim Ray Hart	3B/LF	1963–1973
2008	48	Rick Reuschel	P	1987–1991
2008	6	J. T. Snow	1B	1997–2005; 2008
2008	23, 26, 29	Tito Fuentes	2B	1965–1974
2008	42, 45, 46	Kirk Rueter	P	1996–2005
2008	31, 43, 50, 52, 54	Scott Garrelts	P	1982–1991
2008	6	Robby Thompson	2B	1986–1996
2008	5, 51	Tom Haller	C	1961–1967
2008	2, 35	Chris Speier	SS	1971–1977; 1987–1989
2008	7, 14, 17	Atlee Hammaker	P	1982–1985; 1987–1990
2009	21	**Jeff Kent**^{†}	2B	1997–2002
2010	33, 35, 57	Rich Aurilia	SS	1995–2003; 2007–2009
2010	36, 55	Shawn Estes	P	1995–2001
2011	7, 56	Marvin Benard	OF	1995–2003
2011	29	Jason Schmidt	P	2001–2006
2017	25	Barry Bonds	LF	1993–2007
2018	18, 43	Matt Cain	P	2005–2017
2018	33, 38	Brian Wilson	P	2006–2012
2018	14, 32, 51	Ryan Vogelsong	P	2000–2001; 2011–2015
2019	—	Peter Magowan	Managing General Partner	1993–2008
2021	—	Bob Lurie	Owner	1976–1993
2022	8	Hunter Pence	RF	2012–2018; 2020
2023	—	Mike Murphy	Clubhouse Manager	1958–2023
2024	41	Jeremy Affeldt	P	2009–2015
2024	46	Santiago Casilla	P	2010–2016
2024	49	Javier López	P	2010–2016
2024	54	Sergio Romo	P	2008–2016
2026	9	Brandon Belt	1B	2011–2022
2026	35	Brandon Crawford	SS	2011–2023
2026	12	Joe Panik	2B	2014–2019
2026	28	Buster Posey	C	2009–2019; 2021
2026	56, 48	Pablo Sandoval	3B/1B	2008–2014; 2017–2020

=== Retired numbers ===
The Giants have retired 12 numbers in the history of the franchise, most recently Jeff Kent's number 21 in 2026.

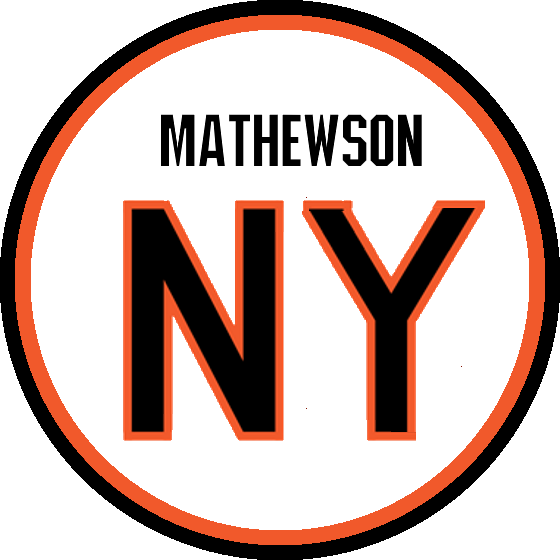
Christy
Mathewson
P

Honored
1988
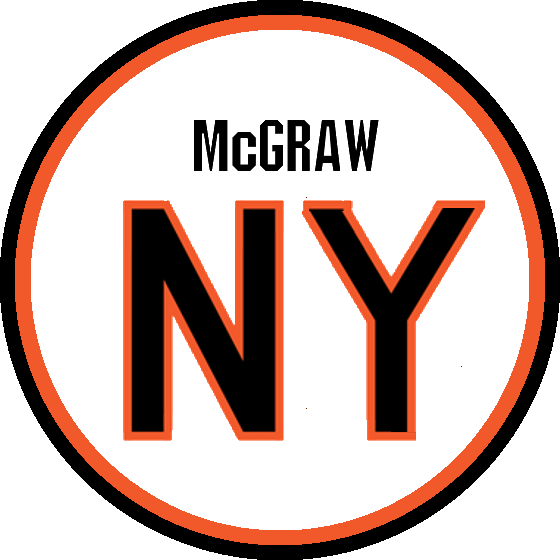
John
McGraw
3B
Mgr
Honored
1988
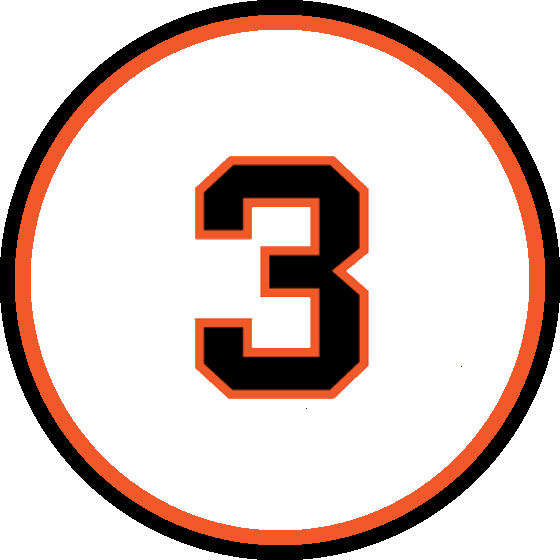
Bill
Terry
1B
Mgr, GM
Retired
1984
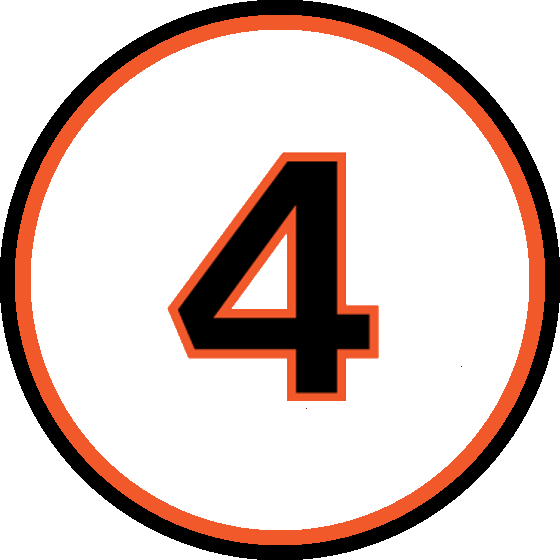
Mel
Ott
RF
Mgr
Retired
1949
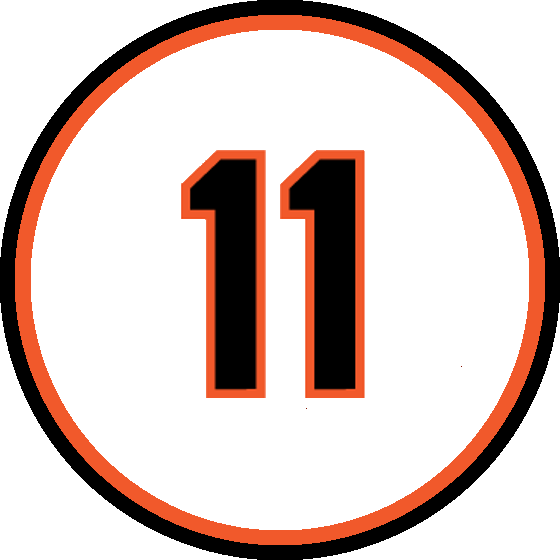
Carl
Hubbell
P

Retired
1944
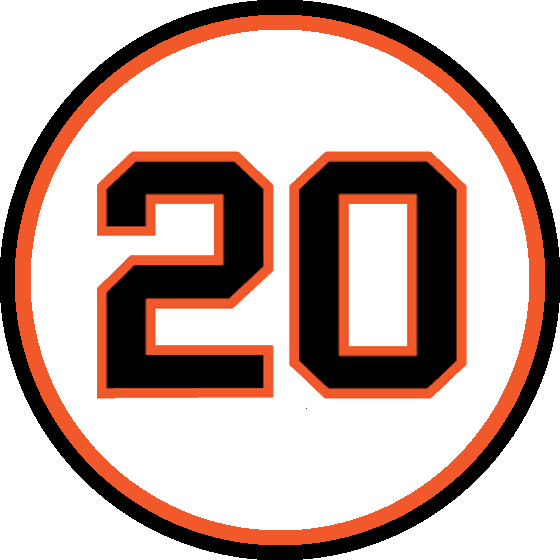
Monte
Irvin
LF

Retired June 26, 2010
Jeff
Kent
2B

Retired August 29, 2026
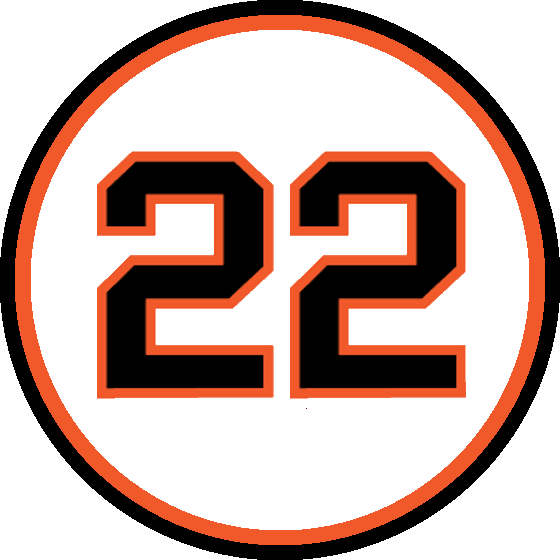
Will
Clark
1B

Retired July 30, 2022
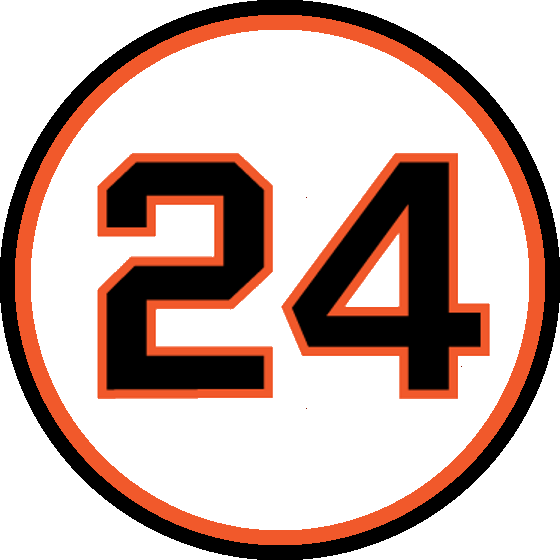
Willie
Mays
CF

Retired May 12, 1972
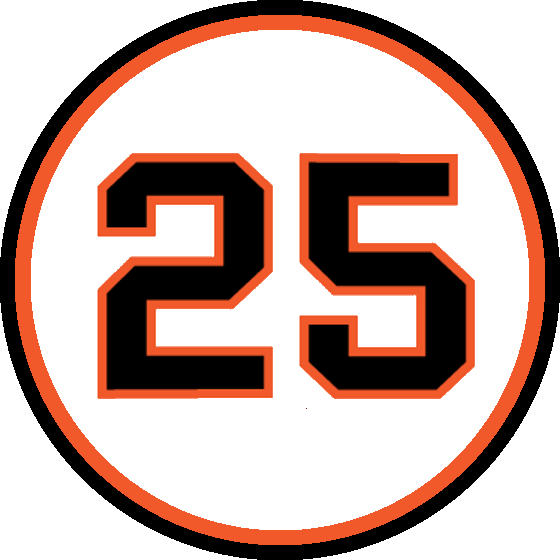
Barry
Bonds
LF

Retired August 11, 2018
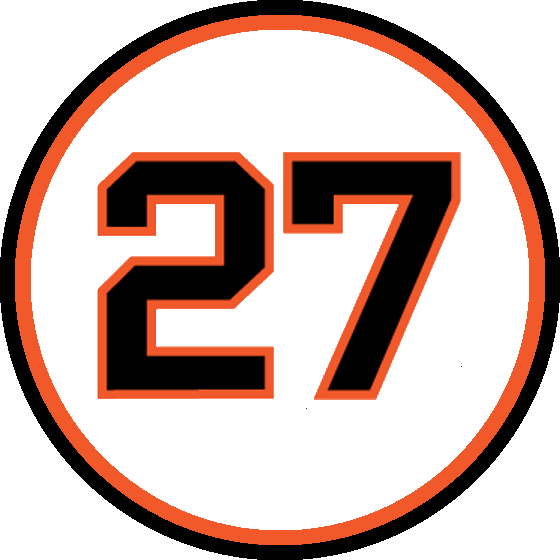
Juan
Marichal
P

Retired
1975
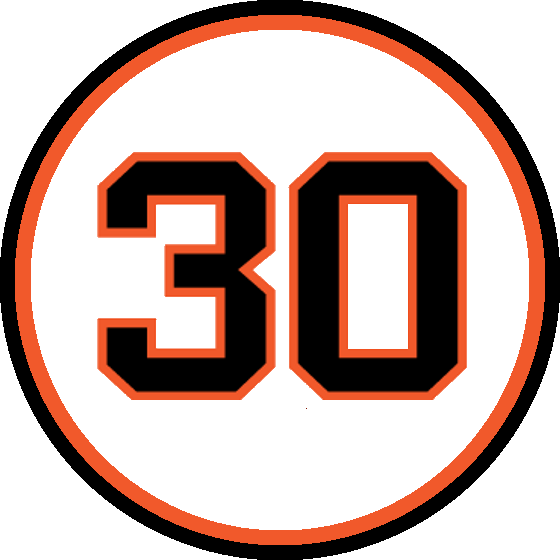
Orlando
Cepeda
1B

Retired July 11, 1999
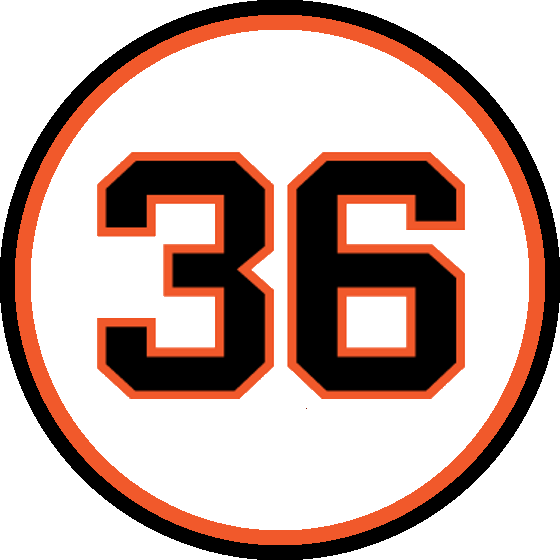
Gaylord
Perry
P

Retired July 23, 2005
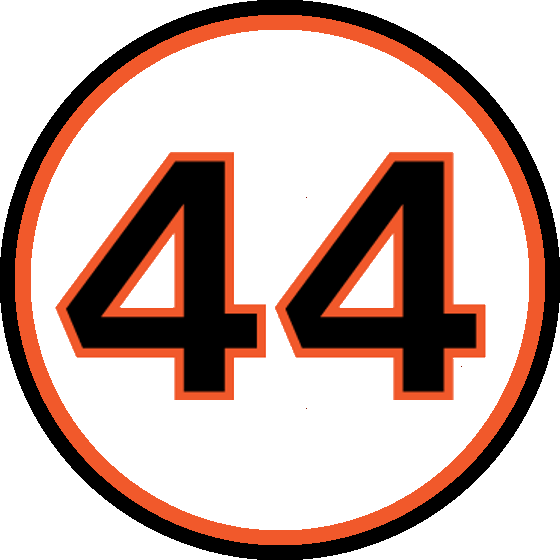
Willie
McCovey
1B

Retired September 21, 1980
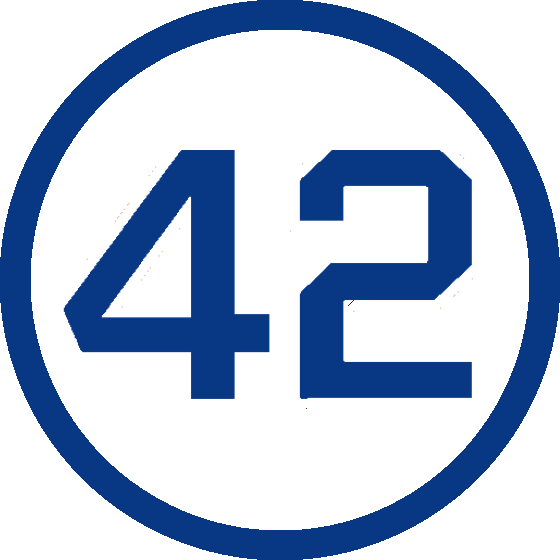
Jackie
Robinson*
–
All MLB
Honored April 15, 1997

* Retired throughout the major leagues; Robinson actually was traded to the Giants, but retired before playing a game for them.

Of the Giants whose numbers have been retired, all but Bonds and Clark have been elected to the National Baseball Hall of Fame. In 1944, Carl Hubbell (#11) became the first National Leaguer to have his number retired by his team. Bill Terry (#3), Mel Ott (#4), and Hubbell played or managed their entire careers for the New York Giants. Willie Mays (#24) began his career in New York, moving with the Giants to San Francisco in 1958; he did not play in most of 1952 and all of 1953 due to his service in the Korean War. Mathewson and McGraw are honored by the Giants, but played in an era before uniform numbers became standard in baseball.

The Giants had originally scheduled to retire Will Clark's #22 on July 11, 2020, but the ceremony was postponed until July 30, 2022, due to the COVID-19 pandemic.

=== Also honored ===
John McGraw (3B, 1902–06; manager, 1902–32) and Christy Mathewson (P, 1900–16), who were members of the New York Giants before the introduction of uniform numbers, have the letters "NY" displayed in place of a number.

Broadcasters Lon Simmons (1958–73, 1976–78, 1996–2002 & 2006), Russ Hodges (1949–70), and Jon Miller (1997–current) are each represented by an old-style radio microphone displayed in place of a number.

The Giants present the Willie Mac Award annually to the player that best exemplifies the spirit and leadership shown by Willie McCovey throughout his career.

== Team captains ==
The Giants have had ten official recorded captains over the years:

- Jack Doyle, 1902
- Dan McGann, 1903–1907
- Larry Doyle, 1908–16
- Gus Mancuso, 1937–38
- Mel Ott, 1939–47
- Alvin Dark, 1950–56
- Willie Mays, 1961–72
- Willie McCovey, 1977–80
- Darrell Evans, 1980–83
- Jack Clark, 1984

During the 2021 and 2022 season, player Brandon Belt gave himself the title of self-proclaimed captain, but this was not considered an official capacity.

== Season records ==
	Total Games	Wins	Losses	Win %
New York Gothams/Giants regular season record (1883–1957)	10,965	6,067	4,898	.553
San Francisco Giants regular season record (1958–present)	10,478	5,415	5,063	.517
All-time regular season record	21,443	11,482	9,961	.535
All-time post-season record^{[b]}	193	100	93	.518
All-time regular and post-season record	21,636	11,582	10,054	.535

Note: These statistics are current as of end of 2023 season.

== Home stadiums ==
=== New York ===
- Polo Grounds I (1883–1888)
- Oakland Park (1889)
- St. George Cricket Grounds (1889)
- Polo Grounds II (1889–1890)
- Polo Grounds III (1891–1957)
  - Hilltop Park (1911 due to 1911 fire)

=== San Francisco ===
- Seals Stadium (1958–1959 after moved to San Francisco)
- Candlestick Park (1960–1999)
- Oracle Park (2000–present), known as Pacific (Pac) Bell Park 2000-2003, SBC Park 2004-2005, AT&T Park 2006-2019, and since 2019 with its current name

== Roster ==
San Francisco Giants 2027 spring training roster
40-man roster		Non-roster invitees	Coaches / other
Pitchers: 60 Hayden Birdsong; 57 Camilo Doval; 68 Trent Harris; 31 Sam Hentges; 12 Adrian Houser; 87 Yunior Marte; 72 Trevor McDonald; -- Miguel Méndez; 45 Anthony Molina; 63 Joel Peguero; 83 Cesar Perdomo; 73 Randy Rodríguez; 65 Landen Roupp; 77 Carson Seymour; 66 Dylan Smith; 46 Blade Tidwell; 62 Logan Webb; 88 Carson Whisenhunt; -- Rowan Wick; 71 Matt Wilkinson; 67 Keaton Winn	Catchers: 61 Drew Cavanaugh; 79 Jesús Rodríguez; 6 Daniel Susac; Infielders: 2 Willy Adames; 26 Matt Chapman; 16 Rafael Devers; 50 Christian Koss; 7 Marcelo Mayer; Outfielders: 9 Harrison Bader; 91 Scott Bandura; 78 Víctor Bericoto; 53 Jonah Cox; 94 Bo Davidson; 0 Drew Gilbert; 52 Turner Hill; 51 Jung Hoo Lee; 10 Casey Schmitt; Designated hitters: 8 Bryce Eldridge		Manager: 23 Tony Vitello; Coaches: 85 Frank Anderson (pitching director); 96 Oscar Bernard (assistant hitting); 97 Alex Burg (field coordinator/catching); 75 Jesse Chavez (bullpen); 84 Justin Meccage (pitching); 81 Gary Pettis (third base); 82 Shane Robinson (first base); -- James Rowson (offensive coordinator); 33 Jayce Tingler (bench); 99 Taira Uematsu (quality control); 37 Ron Washington (infield); 92 Christian Wonders (assistant pitching); 98 Eliezer Zambrano (bullpen catcher); Vacant (hitting); 39 active, 0 inactive, 0 non-roster invitees; 7-, 10-, or 15-day injured list; * Not on active roster; ^{†} Suspended list; Roster, coaches, and NRIs updated November 15, 2026; Transactions • Depth chart; → All MLB rosters

== Minor league affiliations ==
The San Francisco Giants farm system consists of seven minor league affiliates.

Class	Team	League	Location	Ballpark	Affiliated
Triple-A	Sacramento River Cats	Pacific Coast League	West Sacramento, California	Sutter Health Park	2015
Double-A	Richmond Flying Squirrels	Eastern League	Richmond, Virginia	CarMax Park	2010
High-A	Eugene Emeralds	Northwest League	Eugene, Oregon	PK Park	2021
Single-A	San Jose Giants	California League	San Jose, California	Excite Ballpark	1988
Rookie	ACL Giants	Arizona Complex League	Scottsdale, Arizona	Scottsdale Stadium	2024
Rookie	DSL Giants Black	Dominican Summer League	Boca Chica, Santo Domingo	Rawling Foundation Complex	2021
Rookie	DSL Giants Orange	Dominican Summer League	Boca Chica, Santo Domingo	Rawling Foundation Complex	2021

== Radio and television ==
Giants' television telecasts are on NBC Sports Bay Area (cable) with select games simulcast on KNTV (broadcast). KNTV's broadcast contract with the Giants began in 2008, one year after the team and KTVU mutually ended a relationship that dated to 1961. Jon Miller regularly called the action on KNTV, which used to be exclusive to that channel up until 2021, while the announcing team for NBC Sports Bay Area (NBCSBA) telecasts is Duane Kuiper and Mike Krukow, affectionately known as "Kruk and Kuip" (pronounced "Kruke" and "Kype"). During the 2016 season, the Giants had an average 4.71 rating and 117,000 viewers on primetime TV broadcasts. Since the 2022 season, as Krukow is unable to travel with the team due to his inclusion body myositis, the pair only work home games and select road games, which the road games are done via "SplitKast" where Kuiper would be at the away ballpark and Krukow will be at the NBC Sports Bay Area studio in San Francisco. Shawn Estes, Javier López, and Hunter Pence serve as an alternate analysts for all other Giants road games with either Kuiper or Flemming.

The Giants' flagship radio station is KNBR (680 AM). KNBR's owner, Cumulus Media, is a limited partner in San Francisco Baseball Associates LP, the owner of the team. Jon Miller and Dave Flemming are the regular play-by-play announcers. Joe Ritzo and F.P. Santangelo serves as a backup play by play when Jon is absent and Dave is on TV. In addition to KNBR, the Giants can be heard throughout Northern California and parts of Nevada, Oregon, and Hawaii on the Giants Radio Network. Erwin Higueros and Tito Fuentes handle Spanish-language radio broadcasts on KXZM (93.7 FM).

== Fight song and other music ==
First used for Giants radio broadcasts on KSFO, the team's fight song "Bye, Bye Baby!" is currently used following any Giants home run. The song is played in the stadium, and an instrumental version is played on telecasts when the inning in which the home run was hit concludes. The title and chorus "Bye bye baby!" coming from famed former Giants broadcaster Russ Hodges, which was his home run call.

Following a Giants home win, Tony Bennett's "I Left My Heart in San Francisco" is played in Oracle Park in celebration.

== See also ==
- List of San Francisco Giants team records
- List of San Francisco Giants managers

Awards and achievements
Preceded by Pittsburgh Pirates; 1901–1903	National League champions New York Giants; 1905	Succeeded by Chicago Cubs; 1906–1908
Preceded by Boston Americans; 1903	World Series champions New York Giants; 1905	Succeeded by Chicago White Sox; 1906
Preceded by Chicago Cubs; 1910	National League champions New York Giants; 1911–1913	Succeeded by Boston Braves; 1914
Preceded by Brooklyn Robins; 1916	National League champions New York Giants; 1917	Succeeded by Chicago Cubs; 1918
Preceded by Brooklyn Robins; 1916	National League champions New York Giants; 1917	Succeeded by Chicago Cubs; 1918
Preceded by Brooklyn Robins; 1920	National League champions New York Giants; 1921–1924	Succeeded by Pittsburgh Pirates; 1925
Preceded by Cleveland Indians; 1920	World Series champions New York Giants; 1921–1922	Succeeded by New York Yankees; 1923
Preceded by Chicago Cubs; 1932	National League champions New York Giants; 1933	Succeeded by St. Louis Cardinals; 1934
Preceded by New York Yankees; 1932	World Series champions New York Giants; 1933	Succeeded by St. Louis Cardinals; 1934
Preceded by Chicago Cubs; 1935	National League champions New York Giants; 1936–1937	Succeeded by Chicago Cubs; 1938
Preceded by Philadelphia Phillies; 1950	National League champions New York Giants; 1951	Succeeded by Brooklyn Dodgers; 1952–1953
Preceded by Brooklyn Dodgers; 1952–1953	National League champions New York Giants; 1954	Succeeded by Brooklyn Dodgers; 1955–1956
Preceded by New York Yankees; 1949–1953	World Series champions New York Giants; 1954	Succeeded by Brooklyn Dodgers; 1955
Preceded by Cincinnati Reds; 1961	National League champions San Francisco Giants; 1962	Succeeded by Los Angeles Dodgers; 1963
Preceded by Los Angeles Dodgers; 1988	National League champions San Francisco Giants; 1989	Succeeded by Cincinnati Reds; 1990
Preceded by Arizona Diamondbacks; 2001	National League champions San Francisco Giants; 2002	Succeeded by Florida Marlins; 2003
Preceded by Philadelphia Phillies; 2009	National League champions San Francisco Giants; 2010	Succeeded by St. Louis Cardinals; 2011
Preceded by New York Yankees; 2009	World Series champions San Francisco Giants; 2010	Succeeded by St. Louis Cardinals; 2011
Preceded by St. Louis Cardinals; 2011	National League champions San Francisco Giants; 2012	Succeeded by St. Louis Cardinals; 2013
Preceded by St. Louis Cardinals; 2011	World Series champions San Francisco Giants; 2012	Succeeded by Boston Red Sox; 2013
Preceded by St. Louis Cardinals; 2013	National League champions San Francisco Giants; 2014	Succeeded by New York Mets; 2015
Preceded by Boston Red Sox; 2013	World Series champions San Francisco Giants; 2014	Succeeded by Kansas City Royals; 2015
