= 2025 San Francisco Giants season =

2025 San Francisco Giants
- League: National League
- Division: West
- Ballpark: Oracle Park
- City: San Francisco, California
- Record: 81–81 (.500)
- Divisional place: 3rd
- Owners: Charles B. Johnson (Majority shareholder); Greg E. Johnson (Chairman)
- President: Larry Baer
- President of baseball operations: Buster Posey
- General managers: Zack Minasian
- Managers: Bob Melvin
- Television: NBC Sports Bay Area/KNTV
- Radio: KNBR (104.5 FM and 680 AM)
- Stats: ESPN.com; Baseball Reference

The 2025 San Francisco Giants season was the 143rd season for the franchise in Major League Baseball, their 68th year in San Francisco, their 26th at Oracle Park, and the second and final season under manager Bob Melvin.

On June 15, the Giants traded for All-Star Rafael Devers from the Red Sox in exchange for Kyle Harrison, Jordan Hicks, James Tibbs III, and Jose Bello. However, the Giants could not capitalize off the momentum of the big trade, as they finished with a non-winning record for the eighth time in nine seasons. On the day after the season ended, the Giants fired manager Bob Melvin, after he posted a 161–163 record in two seasons with the team.

The San Francisco Giants drew an average home attendance of 36,121, the 7th-highest of all MLB teams.

== Events ==
=== Offseason ===
- November 1, 2024 − LHP Blake Snell exercised his 2025 opt-out clause, allowing him to become a free agent.
- November 2, 2024 − LHP Robbie Ray declined to exercise his opt-out clause, allowing him to remain with the team. INF Wilmer Flores exercised his option clause, allowing him to remain with the team.
- November 22, 2024 − The Giants avoided arbitration with RHP Austin Warren and OF Mike Yastrzemski agreeing to one-year deals. The Giants tendered the contracts on 1B/OF LaMonte Wade Jr., RHP Camilo Doval, and RHP Tyler Rogers. The Giants declined to tender the contracts on LHP Ethan Small and RHP Kai-Wei Teng, allowing them to become free agents.
- December 10, 2024 − The Giants signed SS Willy Adames to a 7-year contract.
- January 8, 2025 − The Giants claimed C Sam Huff off waivers. RHP Austin Warren was designated for assignment.
- January 9, 2025 − The Giants avoided arbitration with 1B/OF LaMonte Wade Jr., RHP Camilo Doval, and RHP Tyler Rogers.
- January 11, 2025 − The Giants signed RHP Justin Verlander to a one-year contract. C/OF Blake Sabol was designated for assignment.
- January 15, 2025 − The Giants traded C/OF Blake Sabol to Boston Red Sox for international bonus pool money.
- January 15, 2025 − The Giants traded RHP William Kempner to Miami Marlins for international bonus pool money.

=== Regular season ===
- June 8, 2025 − The Giants traded 1B/OF LaMonte Wade Jr. and cash considerations to Los Angeles Angels for a player to be named later or cash considerations.
- June 15, 2025 − The Giants traded LHP Kyle Harrison, RHP Jordan Hicks, OF James Tibbs III and RHP Jose Bello to the Boston Red Sox for 3B/DH Rafael Devers.
- July 30, 2025 − The Giants traded RHP Tyler Rogers to New York Mets for RHP José Buttó, RHP Blade Tidwell, and OF Drew Gilbert. RHP Sean Hjelle was designated for assignment.
- July 31, 2025 − The Giants traded RHP Camilo Doval to New York Yankees for RHP Trystan Vrieling, C/3B Jesus Rodriguez, 3B Parks Harber, and LHP Carlos De La Rosa.
- July 31, 2025 − The Giants traded OF Mike Yastrzemski to Kansas City Royals for RHP Yunior Marte.

== Season standings ==
=== National League West ===
NL West
Team	W	L	Pct.	GB	Home	Road
Los Angeles Dodgers	93	69	.574	—	52‍–‍29	41‍–‍40
San Diego Padres	90	72	.556	3	52‍–‍29	38‍–‍43
San Francisco Giants	81	81	.500	12	42‍–‍39	39‍–‍42
Arizona Diamondbacks	80	82	.494	13	43‍–‍38	37‍–‍44
Colorado Rockies	43	119	.265	50	25‍–‍56	18‍–‍63

=== National League Wild Card ===
Division leaders
Team	W	L	Pct.
Milwaukee Brewers	97	65	.599
Philadelphia Phillies	96	66	.593
Los Angeles Dodgers	93	69	.574

Wild Card teams (Top 3 teams qualify for postseason)
Team	W	L	Pct.	GB
Chicago Cubs	92	70	.568	+9
San Diego Padres	90	72	.556	+7
Cincinnati Reds	83	79	.512	—
New York Mets	83	79	.512	—
San Francisco Giants	81	81	.500	2
Arizona Diamondbacks	80	82	.494	3
Miami Marlins	79	83	.488	4
St. Louis Cardinals	78	84	.481	5
Atlanta Braves	76	86	.469	7
Pittsburgh Pirates	71	91	.438	12
Washington Nationals	66	96	.407	17
Colorado Rockies	43	119	.265	40

=== Record vs. opponents ===
==== Record vs. National League ====
2025 National League record Source: MLB Standings Grid – 2025
Team	AZ	ATL	CHC	CIN	COL	LAD	MIA	MIL	NYM	PHI	PIT	SD	SF	STL	WSH	AL
Arizona	—	4–2	3–4	2–4	8–5	6–7	3–3	4–3	3–3	3–3	2–4	5–8	7–6	3–3	2–4	25–23
Atlanta	2–4	—	2–4	5–2	4–2	1–5	8–5	2–4	8–5	5–8	2–4	1–6	1–5	4–2	9–4	22–26
Chicago	4–3	4–2	—	5–8	5–1	4–3	4–2	7–6	2–4	2–4	10–3	3–3	1–5	8–5	3–3	30–18
Cincinnati	4–2	2–5	8–5	—	5–1	1–5	3–4	5–8	4–2	3–3	7–6	4–2	3–3	6–7	2–4	26–22
Colorado	5–8	2–4	1–5	1–5	—	2–11	3–3	2–4	0–6	0–7	2–4	3–10	2–11	4–2	4–3	12–36
Los Angeles	7–6	5–1	3–4	5–1	11–2	—	5–1	0–6	3–4	2–4	2–4	9–4	9–4	2–4	3–3	27–21
Miami	3–3	5–8	2–4	4–3	3–3	1–5	—	3–3	7–6	4–9	4–3	3–3	4–2	3–3	7–6	26–22
Milwaukee	3–4	4–2	6–7	8–5	4–2	6–0	3–3	—	4–2	4–2	10–3	2–4	2–5	7–6	6–0	28–20
New York	3–3	5–8	4–2	2–4	6–0	4–3	6–7	2–4	—	7–6	2–4	2–4	4–2	5–2	7–6	24–24
Philadelphia	3–3	8–5	4–2	3–3	7–0	4–2	9–4	2–4	6–7	—	3–3	3–3	3–4	2–4	8–5	31–17
Pittsburgh	4–2	4–2	3–10	6–7	4–2	4–2	3–4	3–10	4–2	3–3	—	1–5	4–2	7–6	4–3	17–31
San Diego	8–5	6–1	3–3	2–4	10–3	4–9	3–3	4–2	4–2	3–3	5–1	—	10–3	4–3	4–2	20–28
San Francisco	6–7	5–1	5–1	3–3	11–2	4–9	2–4	5–2	2–4	4–3	2–4	3–10	—	2–4	3–3	24–24
St. Louis	3–3	2–4	5–8	7–6	2–4	4–2	3–3	6–7	2–5	4–2	6–7	3–4	4–2	—	5–1	22–26
Washington	4–2	4–9	3–3	4–2	3–4	3–3	6–7	0–6	6–7	5–8	3–4	2–4	3–3	1–5	—	19–29

Updated with the results of all games through September 28, 2025.

==== Record vs. American League ====
2025 National League record vs. American League Source: MLB Standings
Team	ATH	BAL	BOS	CWS	CLE	DET	HOU	KC	LAA	MIN	NYY	SEA	TB	TEX	TOR
Arizona	2–1	2–1	2–1	2–1	2–1	0–3	0–3	1–2	1–2	2–1	2–1	3–0	1–2	4–2	1–2
Atlanta	1–2	0–3	3–3	2–1	3–0	3–0	1–2	1–2	1–2	3–0	1–2	1–2	1–2	0–3	1–2
Chicago	3–0	2–1	2–1	5–1	3–0	1–2	1–2	1–2	3–0	1–2	2–1	1–2	2–1	2–1	1–2
Cincinnati	0–3	2–1	1–2	1–2	5–1	2–1	1–2	2–1	2–1	2–1	2–1	1–2	3–0	1–2	1–2
Colorado	1–2	1–2	0–3	1–2	1–2	0–3	2–4	0–3	2–1	2–1	1–2	0–3	1–2	0–3	0–3
Los Angeles	2–1	1–2	1–2	3–0	2–1	3–0	0–3	2–1	0–6	2–1	2–1	3–0	2–1	2–1	2–1
Miami	1–2	2–1	1–2	1–2	1–2	2–1	1–2	2–1	2–1	2–1	3–0	1–2	3–3	3–0	1–2
Milwaukee	2–1	2–1	3–0	2–1	1–2	2–1	2–1	2–1	3–0	4–2	0–3	2–1	1–2	0–3	2–1
New York	2–1	1–2	1–2	2–1	0–3	2–1	1–2	2–1	3–0	1–2	3–3	2–1	0–3	1–2	3–0
Philadelphia	2–1	2–1	2–1	1–2	2–1	2–1	0–3	2–1	1–2	2–1	2–1	3–0	3–0	3–0	4–2
Pittsburgh	2–1	0–3	2–1	0–3	0–3	4–2	1–2	0–3	2–1	1–2	1–2	0–3	1–2	1–2	2–1
San Diego	2–1	0–3	2–1	2–1	3–0	1–2	1–2	2–1	2–1	1–2	1–2	1–5	0–3	2–1	0–3
San Francisco	5–1	2–1	2–1	1–2	1–2	0–3	3–0	1–2	1–2	0–3	2–1	3–0	1–2	2–1	0–3
St. Louis	2–1	2–1	0–3	3–0	3–0	1–2	2–1	3–3	1–2	3–0	0–3	0–3	1–2	1–2	0–3
Washington	1–2	5–1	0–3	1–2	1–2	2–1	1–2	1–2	2–1	2–1	0–3	2–1	0–3	1–2	0–3

Updated with the results of all games through September 28, 2025.

== Game log ==
=== Regular season ===
Legend
	Giants win
	Giants loss
	Postponement
	Eliminated from playoff contention
**Bold**	Giants team member

2025 Game Log: 81–81 (Home: 42–39; Away: 39–42)
March/April: 19–12 (Home: 9–4; Away: 10–8)

#	Date	Opponent	Score	Win	Loss	Save	Stadium	Attendance	Record
1	March 27	@ Reds	6–4	**Rogers** (1–0)	Gibaut (0–1)	**Walker** (1)	Great American Ball Park	43,876	1–0
2	March 29	@ Reds	2–3	Lodolo (1–0)	**Bivens** (0–1)	Pagán (1)	Great American Ball Park	40,200	1–1
3	March 30	@ Reds	6–3	**Ray** (1–0)	Martinez (0–1)	**Doval** (1)	Great American Ball Park	14,089	2–1
4	March 31	@ Astros	7–2	**Hicks** (1–0)	Blanco (0–1)	—	Daikin Park	28,324	3–1
5	April 1	@ Astros	3–1	**Webb** (1–0)	Wesneski (0–1)	**Walker** (2)	Daikin Park	30,314	4–1
6	April 2	@ Astros	6–3	**Rodríguez** (1–0)	Valdez (1–1)	**Doval** (2)	Daikin Park	24,114	5–1
7	April 4	Mariners	10–9 (11)	**Bivens** (1–1)	Vargas (0–1)	—	**Oracle Park**	40,865	6–1
8	April 5	Mariners	4–1	**Ray** (2–0)	Miller (0–2)	**Walker** (3)	**Oracle Park**	40,886	7–1
9	April 6	Mariners	5–4	**Doval** (1–0)	Santos (0–1)	—	**Oracle Park**	41,060	8–1
10	April 7	Reds	0–2	Greene (1–1)	**Doval** (1–1)	Santillan (1)	**Oracle Park**	30,138	8–2
11	April 8	Reds	0–1	Lodolo (2–1)	**Roupp** (0–1)	Pagán (2)	**Oracle Park**	30,261	8–3
12	April 9	Reds	8–6 (10)	**Miller** (1–0)	Pagán (0–1)	—	**Oracle Park**	35,186	9–3
13	April 11	@ Yankees	9–1 (6)	**Ray** (3–0)	Stroman (0–1)	—	Yankee Stadium	35,286	10–3
14	April 12	@ Yankees	4–8	Warren (1–0)	**Hicks** (1–1)	—	Yankee Stadium	35,455	10–4
15	April 13	@ Yankees	5–4	**Webb** (2–0)	Rodón (1–3)	**Walker** (4)	Yankee Stadium	36,449	11–4
16	April 14	@ Phillies	10–4	**Roupp** (1–1)	Walker (1–1)	—	Citizens Bank Park	40,636	12–4
17	April 15	@ Phillies	4–6	Kerkering (2–1)	**Verlander** (0–1)	Strahm (1)	Citizens Bank Park	38,119	12–5
18	April 16	@ Phillies	11–4	**Trivino** (1–0)	Nola (0–4)	—	Citizens Bank Park	38,532	13–5
19	April 17	@ Phillies	4–6	Sánchez (2–0)	**Hicks** (1–2)	Alvarado (4)	Citizens Bank Park	41,321	13–6
20	April 18	@ Angels	0–2	Anderson (2–0)	**Webb** (2–1)	Jansen (5)	Angel Stadium	43,912	13–7
21	April 19	@ Angels	3–2	**Roupp** (2–1)	Hendricks (0–2)	**Walker** (5)	Angel Stadium	44,374	14–7
22	April 20	@ Angels	4–5	Darrell-Hicks (1–0)	**Walker** (0–1)	—	Angel Stadium	36,026	14–8
23	April 21	Brewers	5–2	**Birdsong** (1–0)	Anderson (1–1)	**Doval** (3)	**Oracle Park**	31,758	15–8
24	April 22	Brewers	3–11	Quintana (3–0)	**Hicks** (1–3)	—	**Oracle Park**	28,573	15–9
25	April 23	Brewers	4–2	**Webb** (3–1)	Peralta (2–2)	**Doval** (4)	**Oracle Park**	29,049	16–9
26	April 24	Brewers	6–5	**Rogers** (2–0)	Alexander (1–2)	**Doval** (5)	**Oracle Park**	28,592	17–9
27	April 25	Rangers	0–2	Eovaldi (2–2)	**Verlander** (0–2)	Jackson (8)	**Oracle Park**	40,080	17–10
28	April 26	Rangers	3–2	**Walker** (1–1)	Webb (2–1)	—	**Oracle Park**	40,153	18–10
29	April 27	Rangers	3–2	**Doval** (2–1)	Jackson (0–3)	—	**Oracle Park**	40,118	19–10
30	April 29	@ Padres	4–7	Pivetta (5–1)	**Webb** (3–2)	Suárez (11)	Petco Park	47,345	19–11
31	April 30	@ Padres	3–5	King (4–1)	**Roupp** (2–2)	Suárez (12)	Petco Park	37,698	19–12

May: 13–14 (Home: 8–5; Away: 5–9)

#	Date	Opponent	Score	Win	Loss	Save	Stadium	Attendance	Record
32	May 1	Rockies	3–4	Chivilli (1–2)	**Rogers** (2–1)	Agnos (2)	**Oracle Park**	27,198	19–13
33	May 2	Rockies	4–0	**Ray** (4–0)	Senzatela (1–5)	—	**Oracle Park**	35,036	20–13
34	May 3	Rockies	6–3	**Rodríguez** (2–0)	Bird (0–1)	**Walker** (6)	**Oracle Park**	40,049	21–13
35	May 4	Rockies	9–3	**Webb** (4–2)	Márquez (0–6)	—	**Oracle Park**	41,087	22–13
36	May 5	@ Cubs	2–9	Boyd (3–2)	**Roupp** (2–3)	—	Wrigley Field	36,834	22–14
37	May 6	@ Cubs	14–5 (11)	**Miller** (2–0)	Pressly (2–2)	—	Wrigley Field	37,303	23–14
38	May 7	@ Cubs	3–1	**Ray** (5–0)	Brown (3–3)	**Walker** (7)	Wrigley Field	31,889	24–14
39	May 9	@ Twins	1–3	Paddack (1–3)	**Hicks** (1–4)	Coulombe (2)	Target Field	21,744	24–15
40	May 10	@ Twins	1–2	Ryan (3–2)	**Webb** (4–3)	Durán (7)	Target Field	23,813	24–16
41	May 10	@ Twins	6–7 (10)	Durán (1–0)	**Walker** (1–2)	—	Target Field	23,551	24–17
42	May 12	Diamondbacks	1–2	Kelly (4–2)	**Verlander** (0–3)	Miller (2)	**Oracle Park**	27,387	24–18
43	May 13	Diamondbacks	10–6	**Ray** (6–0)	Pfaadt (6–3)	—	**Oracle Park**	30,960	25–18
44	May 14	Diamondbacks	7–8	Thompson (1–0)	**Hicks** (1–5)	Miller (3)	**Oracle Park**	30,078	25–19
45	May 16	Athletics	9–1	**Webb** (5–3)	Sears (4–3)	—	**Oracle Park**	41,112	26–19
46	May 17	Athletics	1–0 (10)	**Doval** (3–1)	Miller (0–2)	—	**Oracle Park**	40,448	27–19
47	May 18	Athletics	3–2	**Rodríguez** (3–0)	Ferguson (0–2)	**Walker** (8)	**Oracle Park**	40,051	28–19
48	May 19	Royals	1–3	Bubic (5–2)	**Rogers** (2–2)	Estévez (14)	**Oracle Park**	28,432	28–20
49	May 20	Royals	3–2	**Birdsong** (2–0)	Lorenzen (3–5)	**Walker** (9)	**Oracle Park**	32,118	29–20
50	May 21	Royals	4–8	Bowlan (1–0)	**Webb** (5–4)	—	**Oracle Park**	29,064	29–21
51	May 23	@ Nationals	4–0	**Roupp** (3–3)	Gore (2–5)	—	Nationals Park	19,195	30–21
52	May 24	@ Nationals	0–3	Irvin (4–1)	**Harrison** (0–1)	López (1)	Nationals Park	36,873	30–22
53	May 25	@ Nationals	3–2	**Ray** (7–0)	Soroka (1–3)	**Walker** (10)	Nationals Park	31,581	31–22
54	May 26	@ Tigers	1–3	Monetero (2–1)	**Birdsong** (2–1)	Vest (6)	Comerica Park	31,640	31–23
55	May 27	@ Tigers	1–3	Flaherty (3–6)	**Webb** (5–5)	Vest (7)	Comerica Park	21,092	31–24
56	May 28	@ Tigers	3–4	Hanifee (3–2)	**Roupp** (3–4)	Kahnle (7)	Comerica Park	31,602	31–25
57	May 30	@ Marlins	2–0	**Harrison** (1–1)	Quantrill (3–5)	**Doval** (6)	LoanDepot Park	10,361	32–25
58	May 31	@ Marlins	0–1	Cabrera (2–1)	**Ray** (7–1)	Faucher (4)	LoanDepot Park	12,387	32–26

June: 13–14 (Home: 8–8; Away: 5–6)

#	Date	Opponent	Score	Win	Loss	Save	Stadium	Attendance	Record
59	June 1	@ Marlins	4–2	**Birdsong** (3–1)	Weathers (1–1)	**Doval** (7)	LoanDepot Park	13,422	33–26
60	June 2	Padres	0–1 (10)	Suárez (1–1)	**Walker** (1–3)	—	**Oracle Park**	35,680	33–27
61	June 3	Padres	2–3 (10)	Matsui (1–1)	**Bivens** (1–2)	Estrada (2)	**Oracle Park**	35,522	33–28
62	June 4	Padres	6–5	**Hjelle** (1–0)	Adam (5–2)	**Rodríguez** (1)	**Oracle Park**	34,821	34–28
63	June 5	Padres	3–2	**Ray** (8–1)	Cease (1–5)	**Doval** (8)	**Oracle Park**	37,436	35–28
64	June 6	Braves	5–4 (10)	**Bivens** (2–2)	Johnson (1–2)	—	**Oracle Park**	39,153	36–28
65	June 7	Braves	3–2	**Rogers** (3–2)	Johnson (1–3)	—	**Oracle Park**	35,162	37–28
66	June 8	Braves	4–3	**Roupp** (4–4)	Strider (0–5)	**Doval** (9)	**Oracle Park**	41,026	38–28
67	June 10	@ Rockies	6–5	**Miller** (3–0)	Agnos (0–3)	**Doval** (10)	Coors Field	24,553	39–28
68	June 11	@ Rockies	10–7	**Beck** (1–0)	Kinley (0–3)	—	Coors Field	23,532	40–28
69	June 12	@ Rockies	7–8	Halvorsen (1–1)	**Rodríguez** (3–1)	—	Coors Field	28,168	40–29
70	June 13	@ Dodgers	6–2	**Webb** (6–5)	Yamamoto (6–5)	—	Dodger Stadium	53,022	41–29
71	June 14	@ Dodgers	5–11	Kershaw (2–0)	**Roupp** (4–5)	—	Dodger Stadium	51,548	41–30
72	June 15	@ Dodgers	4–5	May (4–4)	**Lucchesi** (0–1)	Scott (13)	Dodger Stadium	53,980	41–31
73	June 17	Guardians	2–3	Cecconi (2–3)	**Ray** (8–2)	Clase (15)	**Oracle Park**	36,222	41–32
74	June 18	Guardians	2–4	Allen (5–4)	**Verlander** (0–4)	Clase (16)	**Oracle Park**	34,055	41–33
75	June 19	Guardians	2–1	**Webb** (7–5)	Festa (1–1)	**Doval** (11)	**Oracle Park**	40,093	42–33
76	June 20	Red Sox	5–7	Bernardino (3–2)	**Hjelle** (1–1)	Chapman (14)	**Oracle Park**	40,169	42–34
77	June 21	Red Sox	3–2	**Roupp** (5–5)	Bello (3–2)	**Doval** (12)	**Oracle Park**	39,027	43–34
78	June 22	Red Sox	9–5	**Miller** (4–0)	Weissert (2–2)	—	**Oracle Park**	40,350	44–34
79	June 24	Marlins	2–4	Gibson (2–3)	**Verlander** (0–5)	Faucher (8)	**Oracle Park**	28,643	44–35
80	June 25	Marlins	5–8 (10)	Faucher (3–2)	**Doval** (3–2)	—	**Oracle Park**	31,712	44–36
81	June 26	Marlins	5–12	Simpson (1–0)	**Birdsong** (3–2)	—	**Oracle Park**	33,804	44–37
82	June 27	@ White Sox	3–1	**Roupp** (6–5)	Alexander (4–8)	**Doval** (13)	Rate Field	27,549	45–37
83	June 28	@ White Sox	0–1	Houser (3–2)	**Ray** (8–3)	Taylor (2)	Rate Field	20,090	45–38
84	June 29	@ White Sox	2–5	Gilbert (2–1)	**Miller** (4–1)	Vasil (2)	Rate Field	20,225	45–39
85	June 30	@ Diamondbacks	2–4	Curtiss (1–0)	**Webb** (7–6)	Miller (10)	Chase Field	18,963	45–40

July: 9–15 (Home: 3–9; Away: 6–6)

#	Date	Opponent	Score	Win	Loss	Save	Stadium	Attendance	Record
86	July 1	@ Diamondbacks	2–8	Gallen (6–9)	**Birdsong** (3–3)	—	Chase Field	19,455	45–41
87	July 2	@ Diamondbacks	6–5 (10)	**Doval** (4–2)	Miller (3–3)	—	Chase Field	17,840	46–41
88	July 3	@ Diamondbacks	7–2	**Ray** (9–3)	Pfaadt (8–6)	—	Chase Field	29,769	47–41
89	July 4	@ Athletics	2–11	Sears (7–7)	**Verlander** (0–6)	—	Sutter Health Park	12,322	47–42
90	July 5	@ Athletics	7–2	**Webb** (8–6)	Severino (2–10)	—	Sutter Health Park	12,298	48–42
91	July 6	@ Athletics	6–2	**Birdsong** (4–3)	Lopez (2–5)	—	Sutter Health Park	12,180	49–42
92	July 7	Phillies	3–1	**Rogers** (4–2)	Kerkering (5–4)	**Doval** (14)	**Oracle Park**	40,043	50–42
93	July 8	Phillies	4–3	**Walker** (2–3)	Romano (1–4)	—	**Oracle Park**	40,212	51–42
94	July 9	Phillies	0–13	Luzardo (8–5)	**Verlander** (0–7)	—	**Oracle Park**	37,334	51–43
95	July 11	Dodgers	8–7	**Webb** (9–6)	May (5–6)	**Doval** (15)	**Oracle Park**	40,785	52–43
96	July 12	Dodgers	1–2	Sheehan (1–0)	**Roupp** (6–6)	Scott (19)	**Oracle Park**	41,029	52–44
97	July 13	Dodgers	2–5 (11)	Casparius (7–3)	**Bivens** (2–3)	—	**Oracle Park**	41,048	52–45
–	July 15	**95th All-Star Game in Cumberland, GA**							
98	July 18	@ Blue Jays	0–4	Bassitt (10–4)	**Verlander** (0–8)	—	Rogers Centre	41,339	52–46
99	July 19	@ Blue Jays	3–6	Lauer (5–2)	**Webb** (9–7)	Hoffman (23)	Rogers Centre	42,015	52–47
100	July 20	@ Blue Jays	6–8	Berríos (6–4)	**Ray** (9–4)	Rodríguez (2)	Rogers Centre	41,693	52–48
101	July 21	@ Braves	5–9	Elder (4–6)	**Birdsong** (4–4)	—	Truist Park	34,857	52–49
102	July 22	@ Braves	9–0	**Roupp** (7–6)	Daniel (0–1)	—	Truist Park	36,433	53–49
103	July 23	@ Braves	9–3	**Verlander** (1–8)	Strider (4–8)	—	Truist Park	33,352	54–49
104	July 25	Mets	1–8	Holmes (9–5)	**Webb** (9–8)	—	**Oracle Park**	41,163	54–50
105	July 26	Mets	1–2	Peterson (7–4)	**Ray** (9–5)	Díaz (22)	**Oracle Park**	39,029	54–51
106	July 27	Mets	3–5	Buttó (3–1)	**Rodríguez** (3–2)	Díaz (23)	**Oracle Park**	40,124	54–52
107	July 28	Pirates	5–6	Ramírez (1–0)	**Seymour** (0–1)	Bednar (17)	**Oracle Park**	35,572	54–53
108	July 29	Pirates	1–3	Ashcraft (3–1)	**Rogers** (4–3)	Santana (6)	**Oracle Park**	38,142	54–54
109	July 30	Pirates	1–2 (10)	Mattson (3–1)	**Walker** (2–4)	—	**Oracle Park**	38,144	54–55

August: 14–14 (Home: 7–8; Away: 7–6)

#	Date	Opponent	Score	Win	Loss	Save	Stadium	Attendance	Record
110	August 1	@ Mets	4–3 (10)	**Walker** (3–4)	Díaz (5–1)	**Rodríguez** (2)	Citi Field	42,777	55–55
111	August 2	@ Mets	6–12	Garrett (3–4)	**Teng** (0–1)	—	Citi Field	43,455	55–56
112	August 3	@ Mets	12–4	**Whisenhunt** (1–0)	Montas (3–2)	—	Citi Field	42,876	56–56
113	August 4	@ Pirates	4–5	Moreta (1–0)	**Rodríguez** (3–3)	—	PNC Park	13,921	56–57
114	August 5	@ Pirates	8–1	**Webb** (10–8)	Burrows (1–4)	—	PNC Park	18,421	57–57
115	August 6	@ Pirates	4–2	**Walker** (4–4)	Santana (3–4)	**Rodríguez** (3)	PNC Park	14,005	58–57
116	August 8	Nationals	5–0	**Teng** (1–1)	Irvin (8–7)	—	**Oracle Park**	38,679	59–57
117	August 9	Nationals	2–4	Lord (3–6)	**Whisenhunt** (1–1)	Ferrer (1)	**Oracle Park**	38,742	59–58
118	August 10	Nationals	0–8	Gore (5–12)	**Verlander** (1–9)	—	**Oracle Park**	40,089	59–59
119	August 11	Padres	1–4	Darvish (2–3)	**Webb** (10–9)	Suárez (33)	**Oracle Park**	31,018	59–60
120	August 12	Padres	1–5	Adam (8–3)	**Ray** (9–6)	—	**Oracle Park**	35,186	59–61
121	August 13	Padres	1–11	Pivetta (12–4)	**Teng** (1–2)	—	**Oracle Park**	35,080	59–62
122	August 15	Rays	6–7	Uceta (8–2)	**Rodríguez** (3–4)	Fairbanks (21)	**Oracle Park**	34,172	59–63
123	August 16	Rays	1–2	Uceta (9–2)	**Buttó** (3–3)	Fairbanks (22)	**Oracle Park**	35,070	59–64
124	August 17	Rays	7–1	**Webb** (11–9)	Pepiot (8–10)	—	**Oracle Park**	38,876	60–64
125	August 18	@ Padres	4–3	**Ray** (10–6)	Cortés Jr. (1–2)	**Rodríguez** (4)	Petco Park	42,730	61–64
126	August 19	@ Padres	1–5	Pivetta (13–4)	**Teng** (1–3)	—	Petco Park	40,624	61–65
127	August 20	@ Padres	1–8	Sears (8–10)	**Roupp** (7–7)	—	Petco Park	42,589	61–66
128	August 21	@ Padres	4–8	Cease (6–11)	**Verlander** (1–10)	—	Petco Park	39,156	61–67
129	August 22	@ Brewers	4–5	Megill (5–2)	**Rodríguez** (3–5)	—	American Family Field	41,716	61–68
130	August 23	@ Brewers	7–1	**Webb** (12–9)	Anderson (2–5)	—	American Family Field	41,034	62–68
131	August 24	@ Brewers	4–3	**Buttó** (4–3)	Megill (5–3)	**Walker** (11)	American Family Field	42,053	63–68
132	August 26	Cubs	5–2	**Verlander** (2–10)	Boyd (12–7)	**Walker** (12)	**Oracle Park**	35,060	64–68
133	August 27	Cubs	12–3	**Whisenhunt** (2–1)	Rea (10–6)	—	**Oracle Park**	30,457	65–68
134	August 28	Cubs	4–3	**Walker** (5–4)	Palencia (1–4)	—	**Oracle Park**	32,187	66–68
135	August 29	Orioles	15–8	**Bivens** (3–3)	Kremer (9–10)	—	**Oracle Park**	40,043	67–68
136	August 30	Orioles	1–11	Rogers (8–2)	**Seymour** (0–2)	—	**Oracle Park**	37,711	67–69
137	August 31	Orioles	13–2	**Verlander** (3–10)	Sugano (10–7)	**Bivens** (1)	**Oracle Park**	39,220	68–69

September: 13–12 (Home: 7–5; Away: 6–7)

#	Date	Opponent	Score	Win	Loss	Save	Stadium	Attendance	Record
138	September 1	@ Rockies	8–2	**Teng** (2–3)	Dollander (2–12)	—	Coors Field	28,805	69–69
139	September 2	@ Rockies	7–4	**Webb** (13–9)	Freeland (3–14)	**Walker** (13)	Coors Field	18,934	70–69
140	September 3	@ Rockies	10–8	**Peguero** (1–0)	Peralta (1–3)	**Walker** (14)	Coors Field	19,802	71–69
141	September 5	@ Cardinals	8–2	**Seymour** (1–2)	McGreevy (6–3)	**Beck** (1)	Busch Stadium	25,837	72–69
142	September 6	@ Cardinals	2–3	O'Brien (3–0)	**Walker** (5–5)	—	Busch Stadium	26,085	72–70
143	September 7	@ Cardinals	3–4	Gray (13–8)	**Teng** (2–4)	O'Brien (3)	Busch Stadium	29,923	72–71
144	September 8	Diamondbacks	11–5	**Webb** (14–9)	Garcia (0–1)	—	**Oracle Park**	26,699	73–71
145	September 9	Diamondbacks	5–3	**Ray** (11–6)	Gallen (11–14)	**Walker** (15)	**Oracle Park**	30,883	74–71
146	September 10	Diamondbacks	3–5	Rodríguez (8–8)	**Seymour** (1–3)	—	**Oracle Park**	33,810	74–72
147	September 12	Dodgers	5–1 (10)	**Peguero** (2–0)	Treinen (1–4)	—	**Oracle Park**	40,509	75–72
148	September 13	Dodgers	7–13	Henriquez (1–1)	**Webb** (14–10)	—	**Oracle Park**	40,474	75–73
149	September 14	Dodgers	2–10	Glasnow (3–3)	**Ray** (11–7)	—	**Oracle Park**	40,112	75–74
150	September 15	@ Diamondbacks	1–8	Gallen (12–14)	**Gage** (0–1)	—	Chase Field	21,251	75–75
151	September 16	@ Diamondbacks	5–6	Saalfrank (2–1)	**Walker** (5–6)	—	Chase Field	28,431	75–76
152	September 17	@ Diamondbacks	5–1 (11)	**Peguero** (3–0)	Curtiss (3–2)	—	Chase Field	19,513	76–76
153	September 18	@ Dodgers	1–2	Dreyer (3–2)	**Webb** (14–11)	Vesia (5)	Dodger Stadium	41,225	76–77
154	September 19	@ Dodgers	3–6	Henriquez (2–1)	**Ray** (11–8)	Scott (22)	Dodger Stadium	53,037	76–78
155	September 20	@ Dodgers	5–7	Glasnow (4–3)	**Peguero** (3–1)	Dreyer (5)	Dodger Stadium	52,251	76–79
156	September 21	@ Dodgers	3–1	**Bivens** (4–3)	Treinen (1–7)	**Walker** (16)	Dodger Stadium	46,601	77–79
157	September 22	Cardinals	5–6	McGreevy (8–3)	**Verlander** (3–11)	Romero (8)	**Oracle Park**	31,301	77–80
158	September 23	Cardinals	8–9	Svanson (4–0)	**Walker** (5–7)	O'Brien (6)	**Oracle Park**	37,012	77–81
159	September 24	Cardinals	4–3	**Buttó** (5–3)	O'Brien (3–1)	**Beck** (2)	**Oracle Park**	32,409	78–81
160	September 26	Rockies	6–3	**McDonald** (1–0)	Márquez (3–16)	**Walker** (17)	**Oracle Park**	40,048	79–81
161	September 27	Rockies	4–3	**Verlander** (4–11)	Freeland (5–17)	**Bivens** (2)	**Oracle Park**	38,201	80–81
162	September 28	Rockies	4–0	**Webb** (15–11)	Brown (0–5)	**Bivens** (3)	**Oracle Park**	37,536	81–81

== Roster ==
2025 San Francisco Giants
Roster
Pitchers: 54 Scott Alexander; 43 Tristan Beck; 60 Hayden Birdsong; 76 Spencer Bivens; 47 Mason Black; 34 JT Brubaker; 70 José Buttó; 75 Camilo Doval; 93 Matt Gage; 45 Kyle Harrison; 12 Jordan Hicks; 64 Sean Hjelle; 57 Joey Lucchesi; 72 Trevor McDonald; 68 Erik Miller; 63 Joel Peguero; 38 Robbie Ray; 73 Randy Rodríguez; 71 Tyler Rogers; 65 Landen Roupp; 77 Carson Seymour; 66 Kai-Wei Teng; 56 Lou Trivino; 35 Justin Verlander; 74 Ryan Walker; 62 Logan Webb; 99 Carson Whisenhunt; 67 Keaton Winn	Catchers: 14 Patrick Bailey; 23 Sam Huff; 21 Andrew Knizner; 13 Logan Porter; Infielders: 2 Willy Adames; 39 Sergio Alcántara; 26 Matt Chapman; 16 Rafael Devers; 78 Bryce Eldridge; 49 Tyler Fitzgerald; 41 Wilmer Flores; 50 Christian Koss; 10 Casey Schmitt; 7 Dominic Smith; 32 David Villar; 31 LaMonte Wade Jr.; 0 Brett Wisely	Outfielders: 59 Jerar Encarnación; 61 Drew Gilbert; 56 Daniel Johnson; 51 Jung-hoo Lee; 29 Luis Matos; 58 Grant McCray; 17 Heliot Ramos; 5 Mike Yastrzemski	Manager: 6 Bob Melvin; Coaches: 81 Garvin Alston (bullpen); 96 Oscar Bernard (assistant hitting); 97 Alex Burg (catching); 95 Pat Burrell (hitting); 52 Ryan Christenson (bench); 91 Mark Hallberg (first base); 87 J. P. Martinez (pitching); 94 Damon Minor (assistant hitting); 99 Taira Uematsu (quality control coach); 9 Matt Williams (third base)

== Player stats ==
= Indicates team leader

= Indicates league leader

=== Batting ===
Note: G = Games played; AB = At bats; R = Runs scored; H = Hits; 2B = Doubles; 3B = Triples; HR = Home runs; RBI = Runs batted in; SB = Stolen bases; BB = Walks; AVG = Batting average; SLG = Slugging average

Player	G	AB	R	H	2B	3B	HR	RBI	SB	BB	AVG	SLG
Heliot Ramos	157	620	85	159	24	1	21	69	6	52	.256	.400
Willy Adames	160	591	94	133	22	2	30	87	12	80	.225	.421
Jung Hoo Lee	150	560	73	149	31	12	8	55	10	47	.266	.407
Matt Chapman	128	454	76	105	23	2	21	61	9	71	.231	.430
Wilmer Flores	125	419	44	101	10	0	16	71	1	34	.241	.379
Patrick Bailey	135	409	47	91	18	3	6	55	1	30	.222	.325
Rafael Devers	90	335	52	79	15	0	20	51	0	56	.236	.460
Mike Yastrzemski	96	321	38	74	14	1	8	28	6	47	.231	.355
Casey Schmitt	95	312	34	74	15	0	12	40	0	27	.237	.401
Tyler Fitzgerald	72	217	19	47	10	1	4	14	9	17	.217	.327
Dominic Smith	63	204	26	58	12	0	5	33	2	15	.284	.417
Christian Koss	74	174	25	46	9	0	3	23	4	9	.264	.368
Luis Matos	57	172	26	38	9	1	8	22	4	11	.221	.424
LaMonte Wade Jr.	50	144	12	24	8	2	1	15	0	21	.167	.271
Drew Gilbert	39	100	12	19	5	1	3	13	1	7	.190	.350
Andrew Knizner	33	77	12	17	1	1	1	5	0	7	.221	.299
Jerar Encarnación	19	55	5	11	3	0	2	7	1	1	.200	.364
Sam Huff	20	53	5	11	1	0	2	4	0	4	.208	.340
Brett Wisely	22	48	5	10	4	0	1	10	1	4	.208	.354
Daniel Johnson	14	29	5	5	2	0	1	1	1	2	.172	.345
Bryce Eldridge	10	28	1	3	2	0	0	4	0	7	.107	.179
Grant McCray	22	23	3	2	0	1	0	2	0	2	.091	.182
David Villar	9	20	4	4	1	0	0	1	0	4	.200	.250
Logan Porter	4	7	2	1	0	0	0	1	0	1	.143	.143
Sergio Alcántara	1	4	0	0	0	0	0	0	0	0	.000	.000
Totals	162	5375	705	1261	239	28	173	672	68	556	.235	.386

Source:Baseball Reference

=== Pitching ===
Note: W = Wins; L = Losses; ERA = Earned run average; G = Games pitched; GS = Games started; SV = Saves; IP = Innings pitched; H = Hits allowed; R = Runs allowed; ER = Earned runs; BB = Walks allowed; SO = Strikeouts

Player	W	L	ERA	G	GS	SV	IP	H	R	ER	BB	SO
Logan Webb	15	11	3.22	34	34	0	207.0	210	82	74	46	224
Robbie Ray	11	8	3.65	32	32	0	182.1	148	81	74	73	186
Justin Verlander	4	11	3.85	29	29	0	152.0	155	74	65	52	137
Landen Roupp	7	7	3.80	22	22	0	106.2	113	55	45	45	102
Spencer Bivens	4	3	4.00	54	0	3	81.0	83	42	36	25	61
Hayden Birdsong	4	4	4.80	21	10	0	65.2	61	42	35	37	68
Ryan Walker	5	7	4.11	68	0	17	61.1	60	32	28	18	60
Tristan Beck	1	0	4.61	31	1	2	56.2	47	29	29	16	41
Randy Rodríguez	3	5	1.78	50	0	4	50.2	34	12	10	11	67
Tyler Rogers	4	3	1.80	53	0	0	50.0	39	11	10	4	38
Jordan Hicks	1	5	6.47	13	9	0	48.2	55	36	35	20	43
Camilo Doval	4	2	3.09	47	0	15	46.2	32	20	16	24	50
Joey Lucchesi	0	1	3.76	38	0	0	38.1	35	17	16	12	31
Carson Seymour	1	3	4.75	16	3	0	36.0	37	21	19	13	26
Erik Miller	4	1	1.50	36	0	0	30.0	24	5	5	20	22
Kai-Wei Teng	2	4	6.37	8	7	0	29.2	29	24	21	17	39
Matt Gage	0	1	3.91	27	2	0	25.1	28	11	11	10	24
Kyle Harrison	1	1	4.56	8	4	0	23.2	21	12	12	9	25
Carson Whisenhunt	2	1	5.01	5	5	0	23.1	22	14	13	12	16
Joel Peguero	3	1	2.42	17	0	0	22.1	15	7	6	8	17
José Buttó	2	1	4.50	21	0	0	20.0	19	10	10	10	17
Trevor McDonald	1	0	3.60	3	2	0	15.0	14	6	6	2	14
Sean Hjelle	1	1	7.80	12	1	0	15.0	21	13	13	9	11
JT Brubaker	0	0	4.26	5	1	0	12.2	13	6	6	3	12
Lou Trivino	1	0	5.84	11	0	0	12.1	11	8	8	5	11
Keaton Winn	0	0	4.50	7	0	0	10.0	12	5	5	2	9
Mason Black	0	0	6.75	1	0	0	4.0	5	5	3	0	5
Christian Koss	0	0	0.00	4	0	0	4.0	4	0	0	0	0
Scott Alexander	0	0	6.75	2	0	0	1.1	3	1	1	2	2
Logan Porter	0	0	9.00	1	0	0	1.0	2	1	1	0	0
Mike Yastrzemski	0	0	18.00	1	0	0	1.0	2	2	2	1	0
Totals	81	81	3.86	162	162	41	1433.2	1354	684	615	506	1358

Source:Baseball Reference

== Farm system ==
Level	Team	League	Division	Manager	Record Type	Record
AAA	Sacramento River Cats	Pacific Coast League	West	Dave Brundage	Regular	77–73 (.513)
AA	Richmond Flying Squirrels	Eastern League	Southwest	Dennis Pelfrey	Regular	56–79 (.415)
High-A	Eugene Emeralds	Northwest League	N/A	Jeremiah Knackstedt	Regular	81–51 (.614)
Low-A	San Jose Giants	California League	North	Jeremiah Knackstedt	Regular	81–51 (.614)
Rookie	ACL Giants	Arizona Complex League	East	Jacob Heyward	Regular	42–18 (.700)
Foreign Rookie	DSL Giants Black	Dominican Summer League	San Pedro	Juan Ciriaco	Regular	33–23 (.589)
Foreign Rookie	DSL Giants Orange	Dominican Summer League	Northeast	Drew Martinez	Regular	35–19 (.648)

== Major League Baseball draft ==
The 2025 MLB Draft was held July 13–14, 2025 in Cumberland, Georgia, home of the 2025 MLB All-Star Game. The Giants made 18 selections in the draft after forfeting their second and fifth round selections by signing Willy Adames in December 2024.

2025 draft picks

Round	Pick	Name	Position†	School	Year	Signed	Bonus
1	13	Gavin Kilen	SS	Tennessee	College Junior	Yes	$5,250,000
3	85	Trevor Cohen	OF	Rutgers	College Junior	Yes	$847,500
4	116	Lorenzo Meola	SS	Stetson	College Junior	Yes	$652,200
6	176	Jordan Gottesman	LHP	Northeastern	College (redshirt) Senior	Yes	$197,500
7	206	Cam Maldonado	OF	Northeastern	College Junior	Yes	$287,400
8	236	Ben Bybee	RHP	Arkansas	College Junior	Yes	$229,500
9	266	Reid Worley	RHP	Cherokee (GA) High School	High School Senior	Yes	$747,500
10	296	Isaiah Barkett	3B	Stetson	College Junior	Yes	$172,500
11	326	Rod Barajas Jr.	C	Saddleback Community College	Junior College J3	Yes	$247,500
12	356	Cody Delvecchio	RHP	UCLA	College Junior	Yes	$150,000
13	386	Broedy Poppell	C	Florida A&M	College Senior	Yes	$50,000
14	416	Trey Seeley	RHP	Hope International University	College Senior	Yes	$25,000
15	446	Damian Bravo	OF	Texas Tech	College Junior	Yes	$150,000
16	476	Garrett Langrell	RHP	Creighton	College Graduate Student	Yes	$50,000
17	506	Luke Mensik	RHP	Lincoln-Way Central High School	High School Senior	Yes	$482,500
18	536	Cooper McGrath	RHP	Northeastern	College Graduate Student	Yes	$10,000
19	566	Braydon Risley	LHP	Grayson College	Junior College J2	Yes	$100,000
20	596	Elijah McNeal	SS	Dublin High School	High School Senior	No	

† Positions are per MLB Draft Tracker.
