= Zach Agnos =

American baseball player (born 2000)

Colorado Rockies – No. 36
- Pitcher
- Born: August 15, 2000 (age 26); Haymarket, Virginia, U.S.
- Bats: Right Throws: Right

MLB debut
- April 20, 2025, for the Colorado Rockies

MLB statistics (through 2026 season)
- Win–loss record: 1–5
- Earned run average: 6.11
- Strikeouts: 77
- Stats at Baseball Reference

Teams
- Colorado Rockies (2025–present)
Medals
Men's baseball
Representing the United States
Haarlem Baseball Week
| Bronze medal – third place | 2022 | Team |

Zachary George Agnos (born August 15, 2000) is an American professional baseball pitcher for the Colorado Rockies of Major League Baseball (MLB). He played college baseball for the East Carolina Pirates as a two-way player. The Rockies selected Agnos in the 10th round of the 2022 MLB draft, and he made his MLB debut in 2025.

== Early life and amateur career ==
Agnos was born in Reston, Virginia and attended Battlefield High School. He lettered all four years as a two-way player (shortstop and pitcher). In 2020, he began attending East Carolina University as part of the Pirates baseball team. He also majored in business management.

During the pandemic-shortened 2020 season, he appeared in 17 games, slashing .246/.333/.277. Defensively, he did not commit an error in 34 chances, and he appeared as a right-handed relief pitcher in two games in which he did not allow a hit.

As a sophomore, Agnos played third base and appeared in all 61 Pirates games. He finished the season with a .268/.397/.439 slash line, with six home runs and 16 doubles. As a pitcher, Agnos allowed six runs in only 2 2/3 innings.

That summer, he played for the Bourne Braves of the Cape Cod Baseball League. While with the Braves, Agnos hoped to focus on pitching. He had asked manager Harvey Shapiro to pitch throughout the summer, but Shapiro had been hesitant to do so in an effort to rest Agnos' arm. However, the 2/3 innings Agnos threw in the Braves' final game caught scouts' attention as his fastball clocked between 93 and 95 mph.

When he returned to East Carolina, it was to focus on pitching in addition to his work as an infielder. In 2022, Agnos slashed .330/.405/.479 with seven home runs and 15 doubles. He was named a second-team All-American as a utility player by Baseball America and D1Baseball. His ERA dropped to 2.31 in 23 1/3 innings as he became more comfortable as a pitcher later in the season. He was 3–0 with 3 saves. He would play shortstop for most of the game in the infield, do a quick warmup with the third baseman, and then take the mound to close the game.

That summer, Agnos pitched for the U.S. collegiate national team in the Haarlem Baseball Week tournament, pitching 1 1/3 scoreless innings.

== Professional career ==
The Colorado Rockies selected Agnos as a pitcher in the 10th round, with the 296th overall selection of the 2022 Major League Baseball draft. He received a $165,000 signing bonus. He pitched once for the Arizona Complex League Rockies that summer, allowing a home run.

Agnos was the closer for the Low-A Fresno Grizzlies in 2023. He had a 2.06 ERA, 1.01 WHIP, 11.7 K/9 rate, and 2.2 BB/9 rate in 52 1/3 innings with 27 saves, which led Minor League Baseball. He was also named a California League All-Star.

In 2024, Agnos began the season with the High-A Spokane Indians. In 24 2/3 innings across 21 games, he had a 0.73 ERA and 0.69 WHIP with a 10.9 K/9 rate, 0.7 BB/9 rate, and 10 saves. In June, the Rockies promoted Agnos to the Double-A Hartford Yard Goats, where he posted a 1.95 ERA in 27 2/3 innings pitched. He finished the season with a combined 1.38 ERA across High-A and Double-A in 36 outings with 51 strikeouts.

Agnos was assigned to the Triple-A Albuquerque Isotopes to begin the 2025 season. On April 20, Agnos was selected to the 40-man roster and promoted to the major leagues for the first time and made his debut the same day. He did not allow a run in his first six outings, capping that streak with saves on April 30 and May 1.

On June 10, Agnos entered in the top of the ninth inning with a three-run lead over the San Francisco Giants for the save opportunity. He subsequently gave up a solo home run to Casey Schmitt to start the inning, then issued three walks and another hit while recording only 1 out and was charged with a loss. The next day, Agnos entered another close game, allowing an inherited runner to score the go-ahead run in another Giants, come-from-behind win. The two losing efforts nearly doubled his ERA from 2.79 to 5.48.

Agnos went on the injured list on July 27 with an elbow injury. He returned on September 24. He finished his rookie season with a 1–3 record with 4 saves, a 6.61.ERA, and 19 strikeouts in 31 1/3 innings.

== Personal life ==
Agnos's older brother Jake also pitched for the East Carolina Pirates. The New York Yankees selected Jake in the fourth round of the 2019 MLB draft, and he pitched in the minors for one season. Jake also pitched for the U.S. collegiate national team, throwing four perfect innings of relief against Cuba in Havana in 2018. They have two other siblings.
