= Logan Porter =

American baseball player (born 1995)

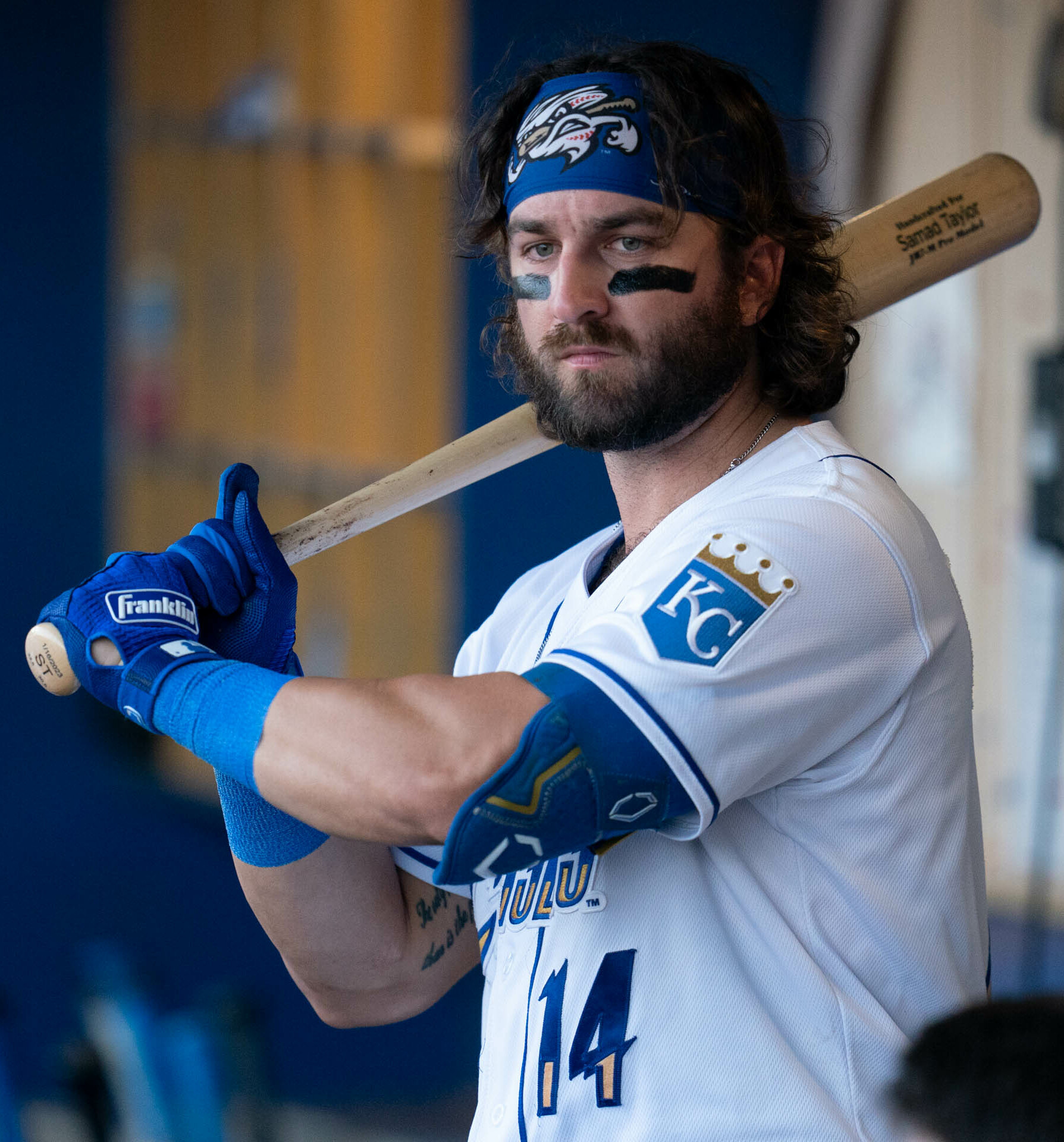
- Porter with the Omaha Storm Chasers in 2023

Los Angeles Angels – No. 33
- Catcher
- Born: July 12, 1995 (age 31); Phoenix, Arizona, U.S.
- Bats: Right Throws: Right

MLB debut
- September 12, 2023, for the Kansas City Royals

MLB statistics (through June 14, 2026)
- Batting average: .175
- Home runs: 1
- Runs batted in: 4
- Stats at Baseball Reference

Teams
- Kansas City Royals (2023); San Francisco Giants (2025–2026); Los Angeles Angels (2026–present)

Logan Porter (born July 12, 1995) is an American professional baseball catcher for the Los Angeles Angels of Major League Baseball (MLB). He has previously played in MLB for the Kansas City Royals and San Francisco Giants.

Porter was born in Phoenix, Arizona, and attended Valley Vista High School in Surprise. He began developing his skills as a baseball player before playing college baseball at Dixie State University and Northwestern Oklahoma State University.

== Career ==
=== Kansas City Royals ===
Porter was not selected in the 2018 Major League Baseball draft, and signed with the Kansas City Royals, who envisioned him as a bullpen catcher, as an undrafted free agent on June 18, 2018. He played in 34 games for the rookie–level Arizona League Royals, also appearing in one game for the Double–A Northwest Arkansas Naturals. In 126 plate appearances, Porter batted .317/.448/.475 with one home run and 16 RBI.

For the 2019 season, Porter played in 44 games for the rookie–level Burlington Royals, hitting .352/.481/.648 with 9 home runs and 37 RBI. He did not play in a game in 2020 due to the cancellation of the minor league season because of the COVID-19 pandemic.

Porter returned to action in 2021 with the High–A Quad Cities River Bandits. In 77 games, he hit .241/.368/.451 with new career–highs in home runs (14) and RBI (45). In 2022, Porter split the season between Double–A Northwest Arkansas and the Triple–A Omaha Storm Chasers. In 112 total games, he slashed .301/.442/.476 with 13 home runs and 62 RBI.

Porter spent the majority of the 2023 season with Triple–A Omaha, playing in 110 games and batting .232/.339/.377 with 13 home runs and 48 RBI. On September 11, 2023, Porter was selected to the 40-man roster and promoted to the major leagues for the first time. In 11 games for the Royals, he hit .194/.324/.323 with one home run and 3 RBI. On November 14, Porter was designated for assignment after multiple prospects were added to the roster.

Porter was non-tendered by the Royals on November 17, but re-signed with the team on a minor league contract the following day. In 32 games for Omaha in 2024, he hit .319/.428/.575 with six home runs and 22 RBI.

=== San Francisco Giants ===
On June 14, 2024, Porter was traded to the San Francisco Giants in exchange for cash considerations or a player to be named later. In 21 games for the Triple–A Sacramento River Cats, he batted .253/.329/.387 with two home runs and seven RBI. On July 16, Porter triggered the opt–out clause in his contract, giving the Giants 48 hours to add him to their roster or trade him to another team that will do the same. San Francisco declined to do so, and he was released by the organization on July 17.

=== New York Mets ===
On July 22, 2024, Porter signed a major league contract with the New York Mets. He appeared in four games for the Triple–A Syracuse Mets, going 1–for–15 (.067) with one home run and two RBI. Porter was designated for assignment following the acquisition of Huascar Brazobán on July 30. He cleared waivers and was sent outright to Syracuse on August 2. Porter elected free agency following the season on November 4.

=== San Francisco Giants (second stint) ===
On November 6, 2024, Porter signed a minor league contract with the San Francisco Giants. In 40 appearances for the Triple-A Sacramento River Cats, he batted .237/.350/.319 with two home runs, 13 RBI, and two stolen bases. On June 11, 2025, the Giants added Porter to their active roster after Patrick Bailey was placed on the injured list, and made his first start on June 12 against the Colorado Rockies. In four games for the Giants, he went 1-for-7 (.143) with one RBI and one walk. Porter was designated for assignment by San Francisco on July 3. On July 7, he elected free agency after clearing waivers and re-signed with San Francisco on a minor league contract.

On October 24, 2025, Porter re-signed with the Giants organization on a new minor league contract. His contract was selected on May 9, 2026, following the trade of Bailey to the Cleveland Guardians. Porter made his only appearance for San Francisco that day, pinch-running for Christian Koss and scoring on an Eric Haase single. On June 1, he was designated for assignment by the Giants. Porter elected free agency in lieu of an outright assignment to Sacramento on June 5.

=== Los Angeles Angels ===
On June 5, 2026, Porter signed a minor league contract with the Los Angeles Angels. He was assigned to the Triple-A Salt Lake Bees, but did not appear for them before having his contract selected by the Angels on June 10.
