= Randy Rodríguez =

Dominican baseball player (born 1999)

San Francisco Giants – No. 73
- Pitcher
- Born: September 5, 1999 (age 26); Santo Domingo, Dominican Republic
- Bats: Right Throws: Right

MLB debut
- May 4, 2024, for the San Francisco Giants

MLB statistics (through 2025 season)
- Win–loss record: 6–7
- Earned run average: 3.06
- Strikeouts: 120
- Stats at Baseball Reference

Teams
- San Francisco Giants (2024–present)

Career highlights and awards
- All-Star (2025)

Randy Alberto Rodríguez (born September 5, 1999) is a Dominican professional baseball pitcher for the San Francisco Giants of Major League Baseball (MLB). He made his MLB debut in 2024. Rodríguez was named to his first All-Star game in 2025.

== Career ==
=== Minor leagues ===
Rodríguez was born in Santo Domingo, Dominican Republic, and signed with the San Francisco Giants as an international free agent on July 2, 2017. He made his professional debut in 2018 with the Dominican Summer League Giants. Rodríguez spent the 2019 campaign with the rookie–level Arizona League Giants, compiling a 2–6 record and 5.40 ERA with 29 strikeouts across 25 innings of work. He did not play in a game in 2020 due to the cancellation of the minor league season because of the COVID-19 pandemic.

In 2021 for the San Jose Giants, Rodríguez had a 6–3 win–loss record with five holds, two saves, and a 1.74 earned run average (ERA) in 62 innings pitched across 32 relief appearances, and had 101 strikeouts (14.7 strikeouts per 9 innings). He held right-handed batters to a slash line of .158/.233/.188. He was named a CAL post-season All Star. On November 20, 2021, the Giants added Rodríguez to their 40-man roster to protect him from the Rule 5 draft.

In 2022 for the High–A Eugene Emeralds, Double–A Richmond Flying Squirrels, and Triple–A Sacramento River Cats, Rodríguez was a combined 2–5 with a 4.46 ERA in 27 games (13 starts) in which he pitched 66 2/3 innings and struck out 97 batters (13.1 strikeouts per 9 innings). He held right-handed batters to a slash line of .114/.253/.220. Rodríguez spent the 2023 campaign split between the rookie–level Arizona Complex League Giants, Richmond, and Sacramento. In 45 appearances for the three affiliates, he accumulated a 4.37 ERA with 84 strikeouts across 70 innings pitched.

Rodríguez was optioned to Triple–A Sacramento to begin the 2024 season.

=== San Francisco Giants ===
On May 2, 2024, Rodríguez was promoted to the major leagues for the first time. In 2024, he appeared in 35 games for the Giants, recording a 4.30 ERA in 52 1/3 innings pitched, with 18 walks and 53 strikeouts.

In 2025, Rodríguez was selected to the MLB All-Star Game after recording a 0.71 ERA over his first 38 innings for the Giants, the lowest mark among major league relievers. Rodríguez was the first non-closer reliever to make an All-Star team in Giants history. He recorded his first career save in the major leagues on June 5, 2025, against the San Diego Padres. Following the July 31 trade deadline, which saw incumbent closer Camilo Doval traded to the New York Yankees, Rodríguez was named as San Francisco's closer. In late August, Rodríguez was placed on the injured list with a right elbow sprain, and recommended for Tommy John surgery, which ended his 2025 season.
