= Ryan Walker (baseball) =

American baseball player (born 1995)

Milwaukee Brewers
- Pitcher
- Born: November 26, 1995 (age 30); Arlington, Washington, US
- Bats: Right Throws: Right

MLB debut
- May 21, 2023, for the San Francisco Giants

MLB statistics (through 2026 season)
- Win–loss record: 20–15
- Earned run average: 3.56
- Strikeouts: 260
- Stats at Baseball Reference

Teams
- San Francisco Giants (2023–2026)

Ryan Patrick Walker (born November 26, 1995) is an American professional baseball pitcher for the Milwaukee Brewers of Major League Baseball (MLB). He played college baseball at Washington State University, and was selected by the San Francisco Giants in the 31st round of the 2018 MLB draft. Walker made his MLB debut in 2023.

== High school and college ==
Walker attended Arlington High School in Arlington, Washington. Playing for the high school baseball team, as a freshman he was named All-Wesco Second Team as a utility player, as a junior he was named to the All-Wesco First Team as an infielder and to the Second Team as a pitcher, and in his senior year he was again named All-Wesco First Team pitcher as an infielder.

He then attended Washington State University, where he earned a bachelor's degree in criminal justice and played college baseball for the Washington State Cougars. As a freshman in 2015, he pitched in 25 games, and was 1–1 with a 2.72 ERA. As a sophomore in 2016, he pitched in 18 games and was 6–3 with 5 saves (10th in the conference) and a 2.40 ERA (fourth-lowest in the Pac-12), and was named All-Pac-12 Conference honorable mention and Pac-12 All-Academic honorable mention. As a junior in 2017, he pitched in 21 games and was 5–5 with one save and a 5.67 ERA, and was named Pac-12 Conference All-Academic honorable mention. As a senior in 2018, he pitched in 23 games out of the bullpen and was 4–4 with 5 saves (9th in the conference) and a 3.98 ERA, as he struck out 47 batters in 46.1 innings, and was named Pac-12 Conference All-Academic honorable mention.

== Professional career ==
=== San Francisco Giants ===
The San Francisco Giants selected Walker in the 31st round, with the 916th overall selection, of the 2018 Major League Baseball draft, and he signed. He spent his first professional season split between three affiliates, the rookie-level Arizona League Giants, the Low-A Salem-Keizer Volcanoes, and the High-A San Jose Giants. In 20 games between the three, Walker registered a 2.51 earned run average (ERA) with 31 strikeouts and three saves in 32 1/3 innings pitched.

He spent the entire 2019 season with the Single-A Augusta GreenJackets. He pitched in 37 games (8th in the South Atlantic League) and logging a 3.36 ERA with 61 strikeouts and seven saves in 59 innings of work. Walker did not play in a game in 2020, due to the cancellation of the minor league season because of the COVID-19 pandemic.

Walker returned to action in 2021, playing for the High-A Eugene Emeralds and Double-A Richmond Flying Squirrels. In 39 appearances, he posted a 3.65 ERA with 66 strikeouts in 49 1/3 innings pitched.

In 2022, Walker split the season between Richmond and the Triple-A Sacramento River Cats. In 50 combined appearances, Walker registered a 7–3 record and 3.74 ERA with 65 strikeouts and two saves in 53 innings pitched. He used a unique deceptive crossfire delivery, starting on the first base side of the pitching rubber and then stepping towards the third-base line and throwing across his body with a sidearm release, throwing a 94 mph sinker and an 82 mph slider.

Walker returned to Sacramento to begin the 2023 season, where he made 15 appearances and recorded an excellent 0.89 ERA with 23 strikeouts and one save in 20 1/3 innings pitched. On May 19, 2023, he was selected by the Giants to the 40-man roster and promoted to the major leagues for the first time. On May 21, 2023, Walker made his first major league appearance and earned his first major league victory, against the Miami Marlins.

On June 12, 2026, Walker, alongside teammates Landen Roupp and JT Brubaker each wrote the Bible passage Genesis 9:12–16 on their respective hats, which featured a rainbow Giants logo, during the Giants' Pride Night event. Following the game, all three were each reprimanded and issued warnings by MLB for writing on their caps. The players' protest drew criticism from local outlets and fans, given the region's long history with the LGBTQ community.

Walker was demoted to the Sacramento Triple-A team and on July 9, 2026, after posting a 7.52 ERA.

=== Milwaukee Brewers ===
On November 15, 2026, Walker was traded to the Milwaukee Brewers in exchange for Blake Holub and Gavin Perry.

== Personal life ==
On September 25, 2021, Walker married Alexis Dirige. They met while attending Washington State University, where Alexis played volleyball and set a school record for career digs. The two have two daughters.
