= Trevor McDonald (baseball) =

American baseball player (born 2001)

San Francisco Giants – No. 72
- Pitcher
- Born: February 26, 2001 (age 25); Mobile, Alabama, U.S.
- Bats: Right Throws: Right

MLB debut
- September 29, 2024, for the San Francisco Giants

MLB statistics (through 2026 season)
- Win–loss record: 4–7
- Earned run average: 4.38
- Strikeouts: 72
- Stats at Baseball Reference

Teams
- San Francisco Giants (2024–present)

Trevor Dale McDonald (born February 26, 2001) is an American professional baseball pitcher for the San Francisco Giants of Major League Baseball (MLB). He made his MLB debut in 2024.

== Career ==
McDonald attended George County High School in Lucedale, Mississippi. He was drafted by the San Francisco Giants in the 11th round, with the 326th overall selection, of the 2019 Major League Baseball draft. He was drafted while on a senior trip to Puerto Rico and got the call while on a beach. McDonald made his professional debut in 2019 pitching four innings for the rookie-level Arizona League Giants. He did not play in a game in 2020 due to the cancellation of the minor league season because of the COVID-19 pandemic.

MCcDonald spent 2021 with the Arizona Complex League Giants and San Jose Giants, for whom he was a combined 2-4 with a 4.09 ERA. He started 2022 with San Jose before being promoted to the Eugene Emeralds, and was a combined 6-3 with two saves and a 2.31 ERA in 90 1/3 innings in which he struck out 102 batters (10.2 strikeouts per 9 innings).

McDonald split 2023 between Eugene and the rookie–level ACL Giants, accumulating a 1.33 ERA with 51 strikeouts in 14 games (13 starts). On November 14, 2023, the Giants added McDonald to their 40-man roster to protect him from the Rule 5 draft. He was optioned to the Triple–A Sacramento River Cats to begin the 2024 season. In 23 games (20 starts) for Sacramento, the Double-A Richmond Flying Squirrels, Eugene, and the ACL Giants, McDonald compiled a 3-7 record and 4.40 ERA with 78 strikeouts across 86 innings pitched.

On September 29, 2024, the Giants promoted McDonald to the major leagues for the first time. He made his debut in the team's season finale against the St. Louis Cardinals, tossing three scoreless innings with one strikeout and one walk.

McDonald was optioned to Triple-A Sacramento to begin the 2025 season. The Giants promoted him to the major leagues on September 16. McDonald made his first career start on September 21, 2025 against the Los Angeles Dodgers, during which he pitched six scoreless innings. He was removed from the game after issuing a walk and two singles to lead off the seventh, which allowed a run to score. Five days later, on September 26, McDonald earned his first career win against the Colorado Rockies, allowing three runs, five hits, and no walks while striking out 10. He finished the year with a 1–0 record, a 1.50 ERA, and 14 strikeouts, having pitched a total of 18 innings in three appearances.

McDonald was again optioned to Triple-A Sacramento to begin the 2026 season. McDonald was called back up to San Francisco to spot start in a series opener against the San Diego Padres on May 4, 2026. McDonald pitched for seven innings, allowing a single run on two hits, no walks, and posted eight strikeouts. He made 14 starts for San Francisco, compiling a 3–7 record and 5.12 ERA with 57 strikeouts across 70 1/3 innings pitched. On July 24, McDonald was diagnosed with a moderate UCL sprain in his right elbow. On July 28, it was announced that McDonald would undergo Tommy John surgery, which ruled him out for the remainder of the season.

== Personal life ==
In December 2024, McDonald had his number retired by George County High School and received the key to the city of Lucedale.
