= Landen Roupp =

American baseball player (born 1998)

San Francisco Giants – No. 65
- Pitcher
- Born: September 10, 1998 (age 28); Rocky Mount, North Carolina, U.S.
- Bats: Right Throws: Right

MLB debut
- March 29, 2024, for the San Francisco Giants

MLB statistics (through 2026 season)
- Win–loss record: 17–23
- Earned run average: 3.87
- Strikeouts: 292
- Stats at Baseball Reference

Teams
- San Francisco Giants (2024–present)

Landen Brice Roupp (/ruːp/ ROOP; born September 10, 1998) is an American professional baseball pitcher for the San Francisco Giants of Major League Baseball (MLB). He made his MLB debut in 2024.

== Early life ==
Roupp was born on September 10, 1998, in Rocky Mount, North Carolina. He attended Faith Christian School in Rocky Mount where he played baseball.

== College career ==
Roupp played four seasons of college baseball at the University of North Carolina Wilmington (UNCW). In 2019, he played collegiate summer baseball with the Wareham Gatemen of the Cape Cod Baseball League. As a redshirt junior at UNCW in 2021, he started 15 games and went 8–5 with a 2.58 ERA and 118 strikeouts over 101 innings and was named the Colonial Athletic Association Pitcher of the Year.

== Professional career ==
=== Draft and minor leagues ===
After the season, he was selected by the San Francisco Giants in the 12th round of the 2021 Major League Baseball draft. Roupp signed with the Giants and made his professional debut with the Arizona Complex League Giants and was promoted to the San Jose Giants at the season's end. He pitched a total of eight innings between both teams. He opened the 2022 season with San Jose as a reliever before moving into the starting rotation and was promoted to the Eugene Emeralds and Richmond Flying Squirrels during the season. Over 26 games (14 starts) between the three teams, Roupp went 10–3 with a 2.60 ERA and 152 strikeouts over 107 1/3 innings. Roupp returned to Richmond to open the 2023 season, but made only ten starts and pitched only 31 innings, compiling a 1.74 ERA.

=== San Francisco Giants (2024–present) ===
On March 28, 2024, Roupp had his contract selected after making San Francisco's Opening Day roster. Roupp served as a long reliever in the bullpen before making his first major league start on his 26th birthday against the Milwaukee Brewers. Roupp finished the season with a 3.58 ERA in 23 games (4 starts) with 50 1/3 innings pitched.

Roupp was named to the Opening Day roster for a second consecutive year, earning the 5th-starter spot after a strong spring training. On July 25, 2025, Roupp was placed on the 15-day injured list due to inflammation in his right elbow. He was reactivated a month later following a rehab assignment with the Triple-A Sacramento River Cats. On August 20, only five days later, Roupp was hit in the right leg with a line drive during a start against the San Diego Padres, causing him to fall. While attempting to stand, he injured his left knee and had to be carted off the field. Roupp was diagnosed with a bone bruise and did not pitch again in 2025. He finished the season 7–7 over 22 starts, posting a 3.80 ERA across 106 2/3 innings while racking up 102 strikeouts.

On June 12, 2026, Roupp wrote the Bible passage Genesis 9:12–16 on his hat, which featured a rainbow Giants logo, during the Giants' Pride Night event. Following the game, he and teammates JT Brubaker and Ryan Walker were issued warnings by MLB for writing on their caps. Roupp's decision to display the Bible passage on his Pride Night hat drew criticism from some media outlets and fans.
