= Kai-Wei Teng =

Taiwanese baseball player (born 1998)

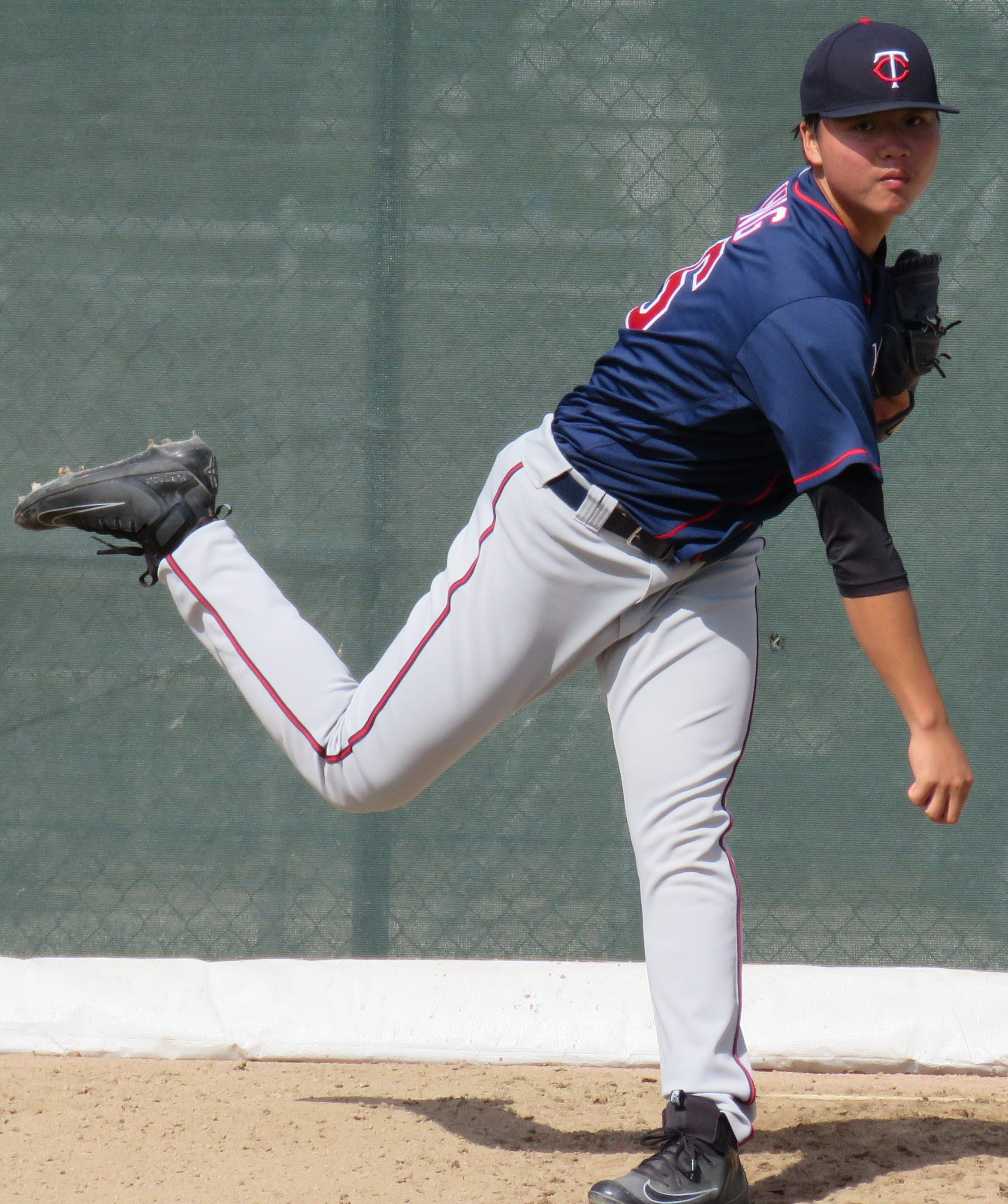
- Teng with the Minnesota Twins in 2018

Houston Astros – No. 17
- Pitcher
- Born: December 1, 1998 (age 27); Taichung, Taiwan
- Bats: Right Throws: Right

MLB debut
- March 31, 2024, for the San Francisco Giants

MLB statistics (through 2026 season)
- Win–loss record: 7–11
- Earned run average: 5.67
- Strikeouts: 119
- Stats at Baseball Reference

Teams
- San Francisco Giants (2024–2025); Houston Astros (2026–present)
Medals
Men's baseball
Representing Chinese Taipei
Asian Baseball Championship
Gold medal – first place	2019	Team

Kai-Wei Teng
- Traditional Chinese: 鄧愷威
- Simplified Chinese: 邓恺威
Transcriptions
Standard Mandarin
- Hanyu Pinyin: Deng Kaiwei
- Wade–Giles: Teng^{4} K'ai^{3}-wei^{1}
- IPA: [tə̂ŋ kʰàɪ.wéɪ]

Kai-Wei Teng (Chinese: 鄧愷威; Wade–Giles: Teng^{4} K'ai^{3}-wei^{1}; born December 1, 1998) is a Taiwanese professional baseball pitcher for the Houston Astros of Major League Baseball (MLB). He has previously played in MLB for the San Francisco Giants.

== Early life and education ==
Teng attended Shi Yuan Senior High School in Taichung before transferring to Kao-Yuan Vocational High School of Technology & Commerce in Kaohsiung. He enrolled at the National Taiwan Sport University.

== Career ==
=== Minnesota Twins ===
On October 20, 2017, the Minnesota Twins signed Teng for a $500,000 signing bonus. He made his professional debut with the rookie–level Gulf Coast League Twins in 2018, making 10 appearances (9 starts) and posting a 3.59 ERA with 47 strikeouts in 42 2/3 innings pitched.

He began the 2019 season with the Cedar Rapids Kernels of the Single–A Midwest League, and was named the league's pitcher of the week for the week ending July 14. In 9 games for Cedar Rapids, Teng logged a 4–0 record and 1.60 ERA.

=== San Francisco Giants ===
On July 31, 2019, the Twins traded Teng, Jaylin Davis, and Prelander Berroa to the San Francisco Giants in exchange for Sam Dyson. He made five starts for the Single–A Augusta GreenJackets, recording a 1.55 ERA with 39 strikeouts across 39 2/3 innings of work. Teng did not play in a game in 2020 due to the cancellation of the minor league season because of the COVID-19 pandemic.

On June 2, 2021, while pitching for the High–A Eugene Emeralds, he was suspended for 10 games after umpires found a foreign substance in his glove. In 21 starts for Eugene, Teng recorded a 4.33 ERA with 142 strikeouts in 95 2/3 innings of work. Teng spent the 2022 season with the Double–A Richmond Flying Squirrels, making 28 starts and registering a 6–12 record and 5.22 ERA with a career–high 169 strikeouts in 136 1/3 innings pitched.

Teng began the 2023 season back with Double–A Richmond, starting 12 games and posting a 4.75 ERA with 68 strikeouts in 47 1/3 innings of work. On June 18, 2023, he was promoted to the Triple–A Sacramento River Cats. In 17 games (16 starts) for Sacramento, Teng logged a 6–5 record and 4.22 ERA with 96 strikeouts across 76 innings pitched.

On November 14, 2023, the Giants added Teng to their 40-man roster to protect him from the Rule 5 draft. He spent some time in major league spring training, and was optioned to Triple–A Sacramento to begin the 2024 season. On March 29, 2024, Teng was promoted to the major leagues for the first time. Teng made his major league debut in relief of Daulton Jefferies, pitching three innings while yielding four hits and three runs. In 4 games during his rookie campaign, he struggled to a 9.82 ERA with 7 strikeouts over 11 innings of work. Teng was designated for assignment by San Francisco on November 19. On November 22, the Giants non–tendered Teng, making him a free agent.

On November 29, 2024, Teng re–signed with the Giants organization on a minor league contract. In 25 appearances for Triple-A Sacramento, he posted a 3–2 record and 3.67 ERA with 86 strikeouts and two saves over 54 innings of work. On August 1, 2025, the Giants selected Teng's contract, adding him to their active roster. Teng started his first game in the major leagues that night, pitching 3 1/3 innings in a loss against the New York Mets. Teng earned his first win on August 8, pitching five innings in relief of opener Matt Gage against the Washington Nationals. He made eight appearances (seven starts) for San Francisco during the year, accumulating a 2–4 record and 6.37 ERA with 39 strikeouts across 29 2/3 innings pitched.

=== Houston Astros ===
On January 29, 2026, Teng was traded to the Houston Astros in exchange for Jancel Villarroel. Teng made the Astros' Opening Day roster. Teng began the 2026 season in the Astros' bullpen, and had been shifted to the starting rotation by late April, where he remained through mid-June. The Astros faced the Detroit Tigers on June 15, and Teng and Hao-Yu Lee recorded the first head-to-head matchups between Taiwanese baseball players in Major League Baseball. Teng faced Lee twice, recording a strikeout and yielding a single. He was optioned to Triple A Sugarland on June 27 but the Astros rescinded the option on July 1 and placed Teng on the 15-day injured list with a right knee sprain. Up to that point in the season, Teng made 23 appearances, including 10 starts, and recorded an ERA of 4.36 with a 4–6 record. Teng was reactivated on July 18, and returned to action against the Baltimore Orioles on July 20. Teng made an additional 7 appearances for Houston for the remainder of the year. His total included a 4.76 ERA, 1.385 walks plus hits per inning pitched (WHIP), and 73 strikeouts over 73 2/3 innings pitched. He set career highs in appearances, innings pitched and strikeouts.

== International career ==
Teng played for the Taiwanese national team (Chinese Taipei) in the 2019 Asian Baseball Championship, pitching in the gold medal game against Japan, which Taiwan won. He was included on their roster for the 2023 World Baseball Classic. Teng declined to join Taiwan in the 2026 World Baseball Classic.

== See also ==
- List of Major League Baseball players from Taiwan
