= Carson Whisenhunt =

American baseball player (born 2000)

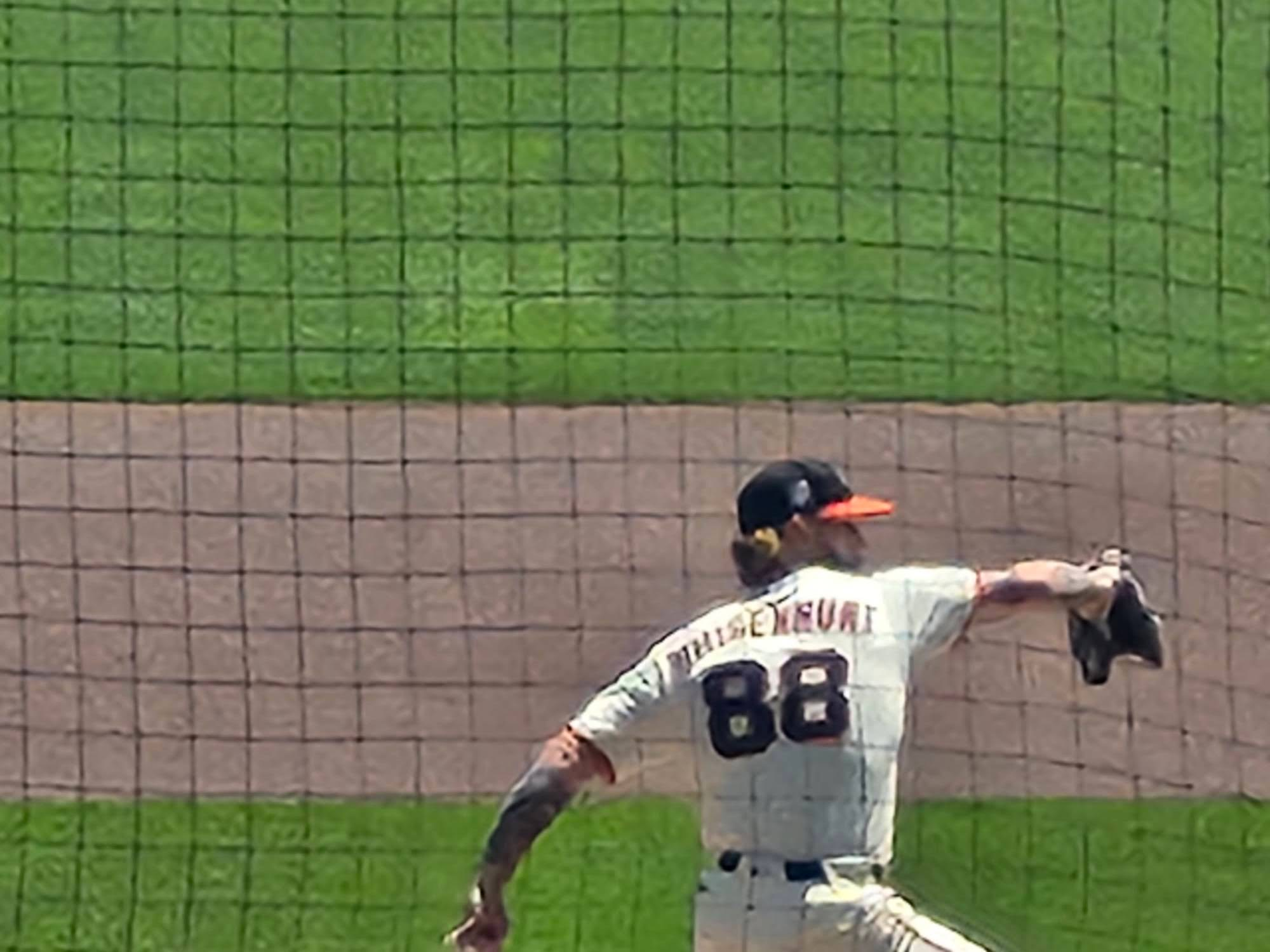
- Whisenhunt pitching with the San Francisco Giants

San Francisco Giants – No. 88
- Pitcher
- Born: October 20, 2000 (age 25); Winston-Salem, North Carolina, U.S.
- Bats: Left Throws: Left

MLB debut
- July 28, 2025, for the San Francisco Giants

MLB statistics (through 2026 season)
- Win–loss record: 5–5
- Earned run average: 5.90
- Strikeouts: 42
- Stats at Baseball Reference

Teams
- San Francisco Giants (2025–present)

Carson Lee Whisenhunt (born October 20, 2000) is an American professional baseball pitcher for the San Francisco Giants of Major League Baseball (MLB). He made his MLB debut in 2025.

== Early life ==
Carson Lee Whisenhunt was born on October 20, 2000, in Winston-Salem, North Carolina. Whisenhunt attended Davie County High School in Mocksville, North Carolina, where he played on their baseball team. He earned All-State honors as a senior in 2019.

== College career ==
Whisenhunt went unselected in the 2019 Major League Baseball draft and enrolled at East Carolina University to play college baseball. Whisenhunt made eight relief appearances as a freshman at East Carolina in 2020 before the season was cancelled due to the COVID-19 pandemic. That summer, he played in the Coastal Plain League for the High Point-Thomasville HiToms. For the 2021 season, he started 13 games and went 6–2 with a 3.77 ERA, 79 strikeouts, and 22 walks over 62 innings. After the season's end, he played for the USA Baseball Collegiate National Team. Whisenhunt opened the 2022 season as a top prospect for the upcoming draft. However, he was served a suspension by head coach Cliff Godwin to open the season. It was later announced that Whisenhunt had failed a performance-enhancing drug test, and was ruled ineligible for the whole season. Whisenhunt stated that the drug in question was a supplement "purchased at a nationwide nutrition store which resulted in a positive test." Following the end of the 2022 NCAA season, he played collegiate summer baseball in the Cape Cod Baseball League with the Chatham Anglers. Over four starts, he went 1–3 with a 7.88 ERA, 21 strikeouts, and six walks over 16 innings.

== Professional career ==
=== Draft and minor leagues ===
The San Francisco Giants selected Whisenhunt in the second round with the 65th overall pick of the 2022 Major League Baseball draft. He signed with the team for $1.87 million.

Whisenhunt made his professional debut with the Rookie-level Arizona Complex League Giants and was later promoted to the San Jose Giants of the Single-A California League. Over 7 2/3 innings between the two teams, he struck out 14 batters, walked one, and gave up no runs. He was selected to play in the Arizona Fall League for the Scottsdale Scorpions after the season. To open the 2023 season, he was assigned to San Jose. In late April, he was promoted to the Eugene Emeralds of the High-A Northwest League. On June 1, Whisenhunt was promoted to the Richmond Flying Squirrels of the Double-A Eastern League. He was selected to represent the Giants at the 2023 All-Star Futures Game. Over 16 starts between the three teams, Whisenhunt went 1–1 with a 2.45 ERA and 83 strikeouts over 58 2/3 innings. He was assigned to the Sacramento River Cats of the Triple-A Pacific Coast League to open the 2024 season. He missed time during the season with a foot injury and rehabbed with San Jose. Over 27 starts for the season, Whisenhunt went 3–5 with a 5.17 ERA and 141 strikeouts over 109 2/3 innings.

Whisenhunt was assigned to Sacramento to open the 2025 season, and was selected to represent the Giants at the 2025 All-Star Futures Game at Truist Park. In 18 appearances for Sacramento to begin the year, he logged an 8–5 record and 4.42 ERA with 86 strikeouts across 97 2/3 innings pitched. After the season, he was selected for the Pacific Coast League Pitcher of the Year Award.

=== San Francisco Giants (2025–present) ===
On July 28, 2025, the Giants selected Whisenhunt's contract and added him to the 40-man roster. He made his major league debut that day as the Giants' starting pitcher at Oracle Park against the Pittsburgh Pirates, giving up four runs and five hits over five innings alongside recording five strikeouts. Whisenhunt earned his first major league win at Citi Field against the New York Mets on August 3. On August 12, he was optioned back to Sacramento, and was then recalled back to the Giants on August 22. The Giants placed Whisenhunt on the 15-day injured list on August 31 with a back strain, which marked the end of his season. For the 2025 season, Whisenhunt started five games for the Giants and went 2-1 with a 5.01 ERA and 16 strikeouts over 23 1/3 innings.

Whisenhunt was optioned to Triple-A Sacramento to begin the 2026 season. He was recalled by the Giants for the first time on June 27, and was optioned and recalled multiple times during the season. He made eight total starts for San Francisco, compiling a 3–4 record and 6.49 ERA with 26 strikeouts across 34 2/3 innings pitched. On August 24, 2026, Whisenhunt exited a start against the Cincinnati Reds in visible discomfort. He was subsequently diagnosed with a torn ulnar collateral ligament in his left elbow, and was recommended for surgery. On August 26, Whisenhunt was placed on the 60–day injured list, officially ending his season.
