= Edgardo Henriquez =

Venezuelan baseball player (born 2002)

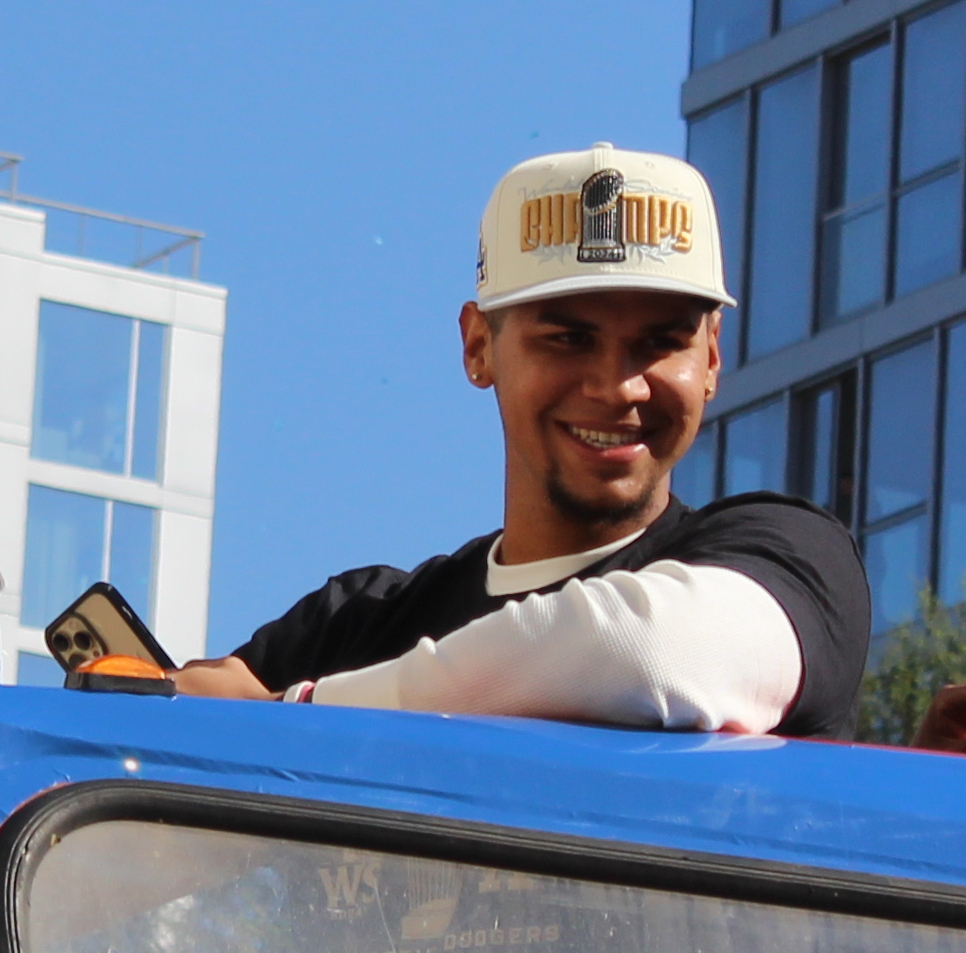

Los Angeles Dodgers – No. 60
- Pitcher
- Born: June 24, 2002 (age 24); Cumana, Venezuela
- Bats: Right Throws: Right

MLB debut
- September 24, 2024, for the Los Angeles Dodgers

MLB statistics (through 2026 season)
- Win–loss record: 6–2
- Earned run average: 2.73
- Strikeouts: 94
- Stats at Baseball Reference

Teams
- Los Angeles Dodgers (2024–present)

Career highlights and awards
- World Series champion (2025)

Edgardo Luis Henriquez (born June 24, 2002) is a Venezuelan professional baseball pitcher for the Los Angeles Dodgers of Major League Baseball (MLB).

== Career ==
Henriquez signed with the Los Angeles Dodgers as an international free agent on September 25, 2018. He made his professional debut in 2019 with the Dominican Summer League Dodgers. He did not pitch for a team in 2020 due to the cancellation of the minor league season because of the COVID-19 pandemic.

Henriquez played for the Arizona Complex League Dodgers and Rancho Cucamonga Quakes in 2021 (4.93 ERA in 34 2/3 innings over 13 games) and remained with Rancho Cucamonga in 2022 (4.54 ERA in 35 2/3 innings over 14 games). He missed the 2023 season after undergoing Tommy John surgery.

Henriquez returned from the injury in 2024 to pitch for Rancho Cucamonga (five games), Great Lakes Loons (eight games), Tulsa Drillers (16 games) and Oklahoma City Baseball Club (14 games). Between the four levels, he had a 2.72 ERA in 53 innings with 88 strikeouts.

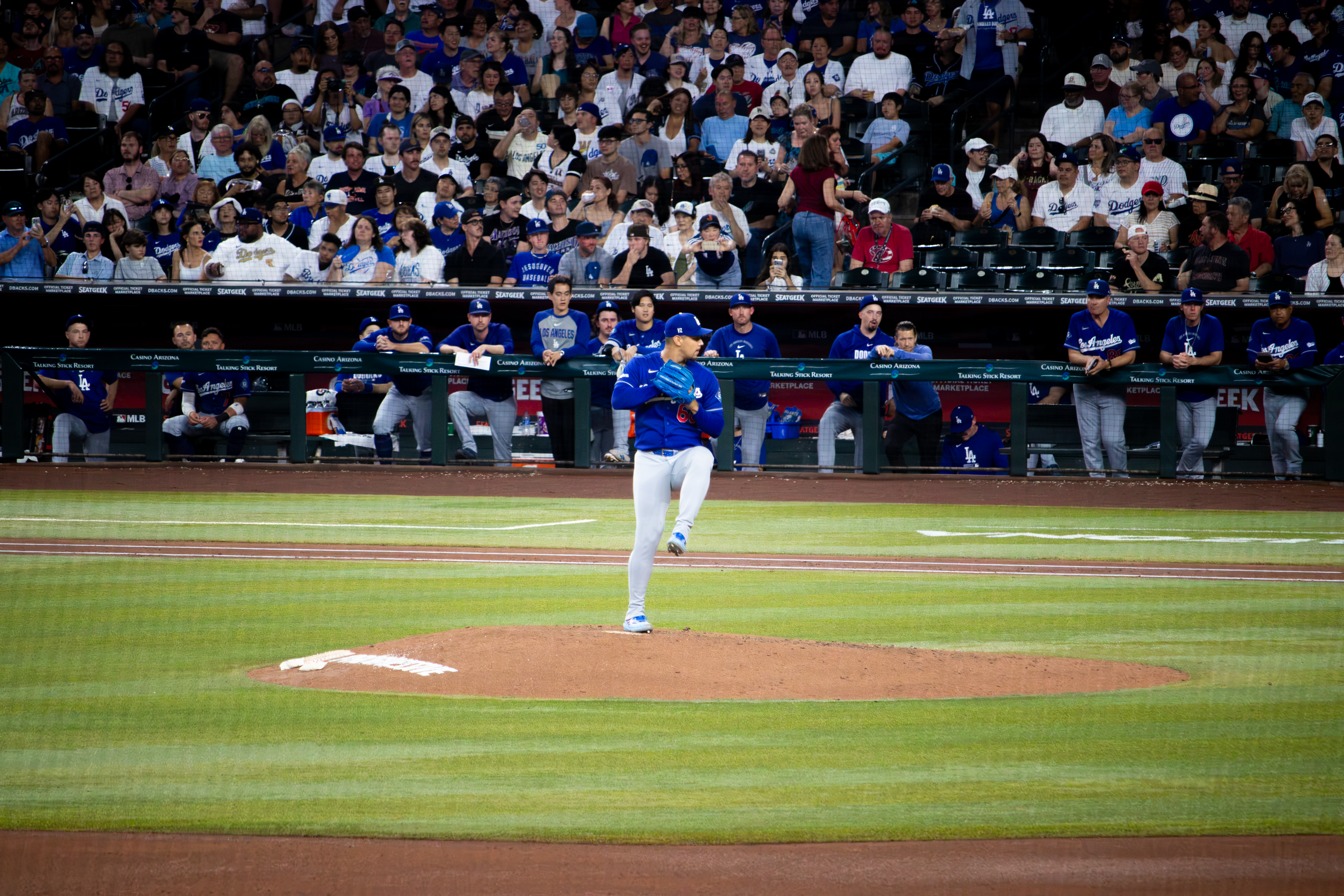
Henriquez pitching at Chase Field in 2026

Henriquez was promoted to the major leagues and made his MLB debut with one inning of relief against the San Diego Padres on September 24, 2024. He struck out the first batter he faced, Donovan Solano. Henriquez pitched in 3 1/3 innings over three games, and allowed one earned run while striking out five. He also pitched in five innings in the postseason, one in the Division Series and four in the National League Championship Series, allowing four earned runs on eight hits. He did not make the roster for the World Series.

Henriquez suffered an injury to his foot in spring training and began the 2025 season on the injured list; he was transferred to the 60-day injured list on April 18. On June 29, he was activated from the injured list and optioned to Triple-A Oklahoma City. In 22 games in the minors, Henriquez allowed 18 earned runs in 23 2/3 innings for a 7.23 ERA. Henriquez was called back up to the majors in late July and pitched 19 innings over 22 games for a 2.37 ERA. On September 13, he recorded his first career win, tossing a scoreless inning against the San Francisco Giants. He was included on the Dodgers' roster for the Wild Card Series against the Cincinnati Reds and made his only appearance of the series in the eighth inning of Game 1, where he allowed all three of his batters faced to reach base, eventually being charged with one earned run. He was left off of the Dodgers' rosters for the NLDS and NLCS before being included on the Dodgers' World Series roster. Henriquez made his World Series debut in the 13th inning of Game 3, where he struck out two batters in two scoreless innings of relief. He made one other appearance in the series, facing three batters in the seventh inning of Game 5, and allowing two walks and a base hit before being removed from the game.

Henriquez pitched 60 innings over 61 games for the Dodgers in the 2026 season, with a 4–1 record, 2.85 ERA, two saves and 71 strikeouts. He missed the last two weeks of the season with a back injury but returned for the postseason.

== See also ==
- List of Major League Baseball players from Venezuela
