= Matt Gage =

American baseball player (born 1993)

Free agent
- Pitcher
- Born: February 11, 1993 (age 33); Johnstown, New York, U.S.
- Bats: Left Throws: Left

MLB debut
- June 6, 2022, for the Toronto Blue Jays

MLB statistics (through 2026 season)
- Win–loss record: 4–3
- Earned run average: 3.69
- Strikeouts: 69
- Stats at Baseball Reference

Teams
- Toronto Blue Jays (2022); Houston Astros (2023); Detroit Tigers (2025); San Francisco Giants (2025–2026)

Matthew Robert Gage (born February 11, 1993) is an American professional baseball pitcher who is a free agent. He has previously played in Major League Baseball (MLB) for the Toronto Blue Jays, Houston Astros, Detroit Tigers and San Francisco Giants.

== Amateur career ==
A native of Johnstown, New York, Gage attended Broadalbin-Perth High School in Broadalbin, New York and played college baseball for Siena College. In three seasons with the Saints, Gage pitched to an 11–16 win–loss record, 3.99 earned run average (ERA), and 212 strikeouts in 248 1/3 innings. In 2013, he played collegiate summer baseball with the Chatham Anglers of the Cape Cod Baseball League and was named a league all-star.

== Professional career ==
=== San Francisco Giants ===
The San Francisco Giants selected Gage in the 10th round of the 2014 Major League Baseball draft. He was assigned to the Rookie-level Arizona League Giants for the remainder of the 2014 season, appearing in 13 games and posting a 2–0 record, 1.89 ERA, and 32 strikeouts. Gage began the 2015 season with the Class-A Augusta GreenJackets, and was later promoted to the Double-A Richmond Flying Squirrels. In total, Gage went 6–7 with a 4.27 ERA and 101 strikeouts in 116 total innings. He played the entire 2016 season with Richmond, making 23 starts and posting a 9–7 record, 3.38 ERA, and 106 strikeouts in 136 innings. Gage made his Triple-A debut in 2017, appearing in games for Richmond and the Sacramento River Cats. In a career-high 145 1/3 innings, he went 6–11 with a 4.21 ERA and 95 strikeouts, and was named a mid-season All-Star for Richmond. Gage began the 2018 season with Richmond, and made appearances in Sacramento, but struggled to a 6.45 ERA. He was released by the Giants organization on July 13, 2018.

=== New York Mets ===
On August 4, 2018, Gage signed a minor league contract with the New York Mets organization and played for both the Double-A Binghamton Rumble Ponies and the Triple-A Las Vegas 51s. In 20 combined appearances over the course of 2018, he posted a 7–11 won–loss record, 5.16 ERA, and 80 strikeouts in 103 innings. Gage elected free agency following the season on November 2.

=== Diablos Rojos del México ===
On April 3, 2019, Gage signed with the Diablos Rojos del México of the Mexican League. In 118 total innings, Gage went 10–4 with a 5.57 ERA and 106 strikeouts. Due to the COVID-19 pandemic's cancellation of the 2020 minor league season, Gage played independent baseball with the Eastern Reyes del Tigre of the Constellation Energy League. In 11 games, he recorded a 3.07 ERA with 16 strikeouts across 14 2/3 innings of work.

=== Arizona Diamondbacks ===
In the offseason Gage played for the Venados de Mazatlán of the Mexican Pacific Winter League, and on February 9, 2021, signed with the Arizona Diamondbacks organization. Now pitching exclusively as a reliever, Gage appeared in 43 games split between the Double-A Amarillo Sod Poodles and Triple-A Reno Aces. He posted a combined 4–1 record, 4.14 ERA, and 58 strikeouts in 45 2/3 innings.

=== Toronto Blue Jays ===
After returning to the Venados in the offseason, Gage signed a minor league contract with the Toronto Blue Jays on November 29, 2021, and was invited to spring training. Matt Buschmann, the Blue Jays director of pitching development and bullpen coach, recommended the team sign Gage, a former teammate. He began the season with the Triple-A Buffalo Bisons, where he went 1–2 with a 1.08 ERA in 16 2/3 innings before being called-up.

Gage was promoted to the majors for the first time on June 6, 2022, and made his debut that night with a scoreless inning of relief against the Kansas City Royals. His first major league strikeout was of Kyle Isbel. Gage made 11 total appearances for Toronto in his rookie campaign, logging a 1.38 ERA with 12 strikeouts in 13 innings pitched.

On January 31, 2023, Gage was designated for assignment by the Blue Jays and then released on February 6.

=== Houston Astros ===
On February 13, 2023, Gage was claimed off waivers by the Houston Astros and optioned to the Triple-A Sugar Land Space Cowboys to begin the 2023 season. In 34 games for Sugar Land, he was 1–1 with a 4.82 ERA. On May 2, he was recalled by the Astros to replace Luis García, who went on the injured list. In five games for the Astros, Gage posted a 2.70 ERA with eight strikeouts across 6 2/3 innings of work. On January 22, 2024, he was designated for assignment to make room for Josh Hader on the 40-man roster.

=== Los Angeles Dodgers ===
On January 29, 2024, Gage was claimed off waivers by the New York Yankees. One week later, the Yankees traded him and Christian Zazueta to the Los Angeles Dodgers in exchange for Caleb Ferguson. Gage was optioned to the Triple–A Oklahoma City Baseball Club to begin the 2024 season but instead was placed on the minor league injured list, then released on April 2. On April 6, Gage re–signed with the Dodgers on a minor league contract. On July 3, the Dodgers purchased his contract and added him back to the 40-man roster to prevent him from exercising his opt–out clause, but kept him in Oklahoma City on optional assignment. In 20 games, he was 1–3 with a 4.29 ERA.

=== New York Mets (second stint) ===
On July 7, 2024, Gage was traded to the New York Mets in exchange for cash considerations. He was called up on July 29 when fellow left-hander Jake Diekman was designated for assignment, but ultimately did not appear for the big league club. In 20 appearances for the Triple–A Syracuse Mets, he compiled a 3.92 ERA with 24 strikeouts and 6 saves across 20 2/3 innings pitched. On November 4, Gage was removed from the 40–man roster and sent outright to Syracuse. He elected free agency the same day.

=== Detroit Tigers ===
On December 21, 2024, Gage signed a minor league contract with the Detroit Tigers. In 23 appearances for the Triple-A Toledo Mud Hens, he posted a 1-1 record and 1.67 ERA with 28 strikeouts and three saves across 32 1/3 innings pitched. On June 12, 2025, the Tigers selected Gage's contract, adding him to their active roster. He made six scoreless appearances for Detroit, striking out three over 5 2/3 innings pitched. Gage was designated for assignment by the Tigers following the promotion of Dietrich Enns on June 26. He elected free agency after clearing waivers on July 1.

=== San Francisco Giants (second stint) ===
On July 2, 2025, Gage signed a minor league contract with the San Francisco Giants. He made five scoreless appearances for the Triple-A Sacramento River Cats, recording two wins and four strikeouts over 5 1/3 innings of work. On July 18, the Giants selected Gage's contract, adding him to their active roster. Gage made his first career start on July 27 against the New York Mets. Serving as an opener, he pitched for one inning, retiring Brandon Nimmo, Francisco Lindor, and Juan Soto on 10 pitches. Gage appeared in 27 games for the Giants in 2025, compiling a 0–1 record, a 3.91 ERA, and 24 strikeouts over 25 1/3 innings.

On July 4, 2026, Gage was placed on the injured list due to a flexor strain, and received a platelet-rich plasma injection. He was transferred to the 60–day injured list on August 2. Following the season, Gage cleared waivers and outrighted to AAA, becoming a minor league free agent in the process.

== Personal life ==
Gage's wife, Paige, played college softball at Siena College.
