= Joel Peguero =

Dominican baseball player (born 1997)

San Francisco Giants – No. 63
- Pitcher
- Born: May 5, 1997 (age 29); Santo Domingo, Dominican Republic
- Bats: Right Throws: Right

MLB debut
- August 21, 2025, for the San Francisco Giants

MLB statistics (through 2026 season)
- Win–loss record: 3-1
- Earned run average: 2.41
- Strikeouts: 22
- Stats at Baseball Reference

Teams
- San Francisco Giants (2025–present)

Joel Alberto Peguero (born May 5, 1997) is a Dominican professional baseball pitcher for the San Francisco Giants of Major League Baseball (MLB).

== Career ==
=== Tampa Bay Rays ===
On August 21, 2015, Peguero signed with the Tampa Bay Rays as an international free agent. He made his professional debut in 2016 with the Dominican Summer League Rays, recording a 3.43 ERA in 16 games. Peguero spent the next two seasons with the rookie-level Princeton Rays, posting a 3–5 record and 8.12 ERA with 31 strikeouts in 2017; in 2018 he made 14 appearances and struggled to a 1–2 record with 38 strikeouts and a 7.44 ERA.

Peguero spent the 2019 campaign with the Single-A Bowling Green Hot Rods. In 31 appearances out of the bullpen, he compiled a 3–4 record and 2.85 ERA with 44 strikeouts and 16 saves across 47 1/3 innings of work. Peguero did not play in a game in 2020 due to the cancellation of the minor league season because of the COVID-19 pandemic.

Peguero returned to action in 2021 with the Double-A Montgomery Biscuits and Triple-A Durham Bulls, pitching to a cumulative 4–8 record and 4.31 ERA with 52 strikeouts and three saves over 39 appearances. He began the 2022 season with Durham, recording a 4.58 ERA with 33 strikeouts in 32 games (four starts).

=== Colorado Rockies ===
On August 5, 2022, Peguero was traded to the Colorado Rockies. He made 18 appearances for the Triple-A Albuquerque Isotopes, registering a 1–0 record and 5.19 ERA with 19 strikeouts and one save across 17 1/3 innings of work. Peguero elected free agency following the season on November 10.

=== Washington Nationals ===
On January 3, 2023, Peguero signed a minor league contract with the Washington Nationals organization. He split the season between the Double-A Harrisburg Senators and Triple-A Rochester Red Wings, accumulating an aggregate 0–5 record and 4.62 ERA with 40 strikeouts and 10 saves across 50 2/3 innings pitched. Peguero elected free agency following the season on November 6.

=== Detroit Tigers ===
On January 22, 2024, Peguero signed a minor league contract with the Detroit Tigers organization. He made 43 appearances out of the bullpen for the Double-A Erie SeaWolves, compiling a 3–0 record and 3.14 ERA with 56 strikeouts and two saves across 51 2/3 innings pitched. Peguero elected free agency following the season on November 4.

=== San Francisco Giants ===
On November 15, 2024, Peguero signed a minor league contract with the San Francisco Giants organization. In 35 appearances for the Triple-A Sacramento River Cats, he logged a 2–2 record and 5.10 ERA with 46 strikeouts across 42 1/3 innings pitched. On August 10, 2025, Peguero was selected to the 40-man roster and promoted to the major leagues for the first time. Peguero made his major league debut on August 21, exactly 10 years after signing his first professional contract. He pitched two scoreless innings, striking out one while allowing two hits and one walk. On September 3, he recorded his first career win, tossing 1 1/3 scoreless innings against the Colorado Rockies. Peguero made 17 appearances dor the Giants during his rookie campaign, finishing the season with a 3–1 record, 2.42 ERA, and 17 strikeouts across 22 1/3 innings pitched.

Peguero made 11 appearances for San Francisco in 2026, recording a 2.38 ERA with five strikeouts across 11 1/3 innings pitched. On June 1, 2026, he was placed on the 60-day injured list due to a left hamstring strain. On August 23, the Giants announced that Peguero would miss the remainder of the season.

== Personal life ==
Peguero has three brothers and two sisters. He is married.
