= Hayden Birdsong =

American baseball player (born 2001)

San Francisco Giants – No. 60
- Pitcher
- Born: August 30, 2001 (age 24); Mattoon, Illinois, U.S.
- Bats: Right Throws: Right

MLB debut
- June 26, 2024, for the San Francisco Giants

MLB statistics (through 2025 season)
- Win–loss record: 9–10
- Earned run average: 4.77
- Strikeouts: 156
- Stats at Baseball Reference

Teams
- San Francisco Giants (2024–present)

Hayden Birdsong (born August 30, 2001) is an American professional baseball pitcher for the San Francisco Giants of Major League Baseball (MLB). He played college baseball for the Eastern Illinois Panthers and made his MLB debut in 2024.

== Amateur career ==
Birdsong attended Mattoon High School in Mattoon, Illinois, where he played baseball. As a junior in 2019, he helped Mattoon win the Apollo Conference Championship and was named to the All-Apollo Conference First Team.

He then played one season at Lake Land College in 2020, where in 15 innings over four games (three starts), he had a 7.20 ERA but struck out 20 batters before the season ended early due to the COVID-19 pandemic. Birdsong transferred to Eastern Illinois University to play for the Panthers. In 2021, he posted a 9.76 ERA in 27 2/3 innings. That summer, he played for the Danville Dans in the Prospect League, recording a 4.93 ERA in 18 appearances.

Birdsong showed significant improvement in 2022. Pitching primarily out of the bullpen, he led the team with a 3.35 ERA over 45 2/3 innings, earning a 5–4 record with 66 strikeouts, and was named First Team All-Ohio Valley Conference (OVC). He also led the OVC with a 1.40 ERA in conference games. Following his collegiate season and prior to the MLB draft, he pitched for the Lakeshore Chinooks in the Northwoods League, where he had a 2–0 record, one save, a 4.15 ERA, and 31 strikeouts in 17 1/3 innings over six appearances.

== Professional career ==
The San Francisco Giants drafted Birdsong in the sixth round, with the 196th overall selection, of the 2022 Major League Baseball draft, signing for an under-slot bonus of $187,500. He spent his first professional season with the rookie-level Arizona Complex League Giants and Single-A San Jose Giants, striking out 23 batters in 11 2/3 innings.

In 2023, Birdsong pitched across three levels (Low-A San Jose, High-A Eugene Emeralds, and Double-A Richmond Flying Squirrels), combining for a 2–5 record, a 3.31 ERA, and 149 strikeouts in 100 2/3 innings. His 3.31 ERA was the best among Giants minor leaguers with at least 100 innings pitched. On July 4, while pitching for Eugene, he threw five no-hit innings with a career-high 11 strikeouts as part of a combined no-hitter against the Tri-City Dust Devils.

Birdsong began the 2024 campaign with Double-A Richmond and was promoted to the Triple-A Sacramento River Cats after logging a 2.05 ERA with 61 strikeouts across 11 starts. On June 26, Birdsong was selected to the 40-man roster and promoted to the major leagues for the first time. He made his major league debut that same day at Oracle Park against the Chicago Cubs, starting the game and allowing three runs in 4 2/3 innings. He made 16 starts for the Giants in his rookie season, finishing with a 5–6 record and a 4.75 ERA with 88 strikeouts in 72 innings pitched in 2024.

Birdsong began the 2025 season in the Giants' bullpen, posting a 2.31 ERA in his first 11 relief appearances. On May 20, he made his first start of the season: against the Kansas City Royals, Birdsong pitched five scoreless innings, allowing five hits and no walks while striking out four, earning the win in a 3–2 Giants victory. He ultimately struggled in the starting role, recording a 6.17 ERA with 27 walks in 42 1/3 innings in 10 starts, and was optioned to Triple-A Sacramento on July 22, 2025.

On March 19, 2026, it was announced that Birdsong would miss the entirety of the season due to Tommy John surgery, the result of an elbow issue that lingered during spring training.

=== Pitching style ===
Birdsong is a 6-foot-4, 215-pound right-handed pitcher who throws four different pitches. His primary pitch is a four-seam fastball that sits in the mid-90s, typically 93-97 mph, and has been clocked as high as 99 mph, featuring riding and running action. His main off-speed pitch is a curveball in the upper-70s to low-80s with significant depth, considered his best bat-missing pitch. He also throws a slider in the mid-80s and a changeup. While initially developed as a starter by the Giants, he has also pitched as a reliever.

== Personal life ==
Birdsong's parents, Stacey and Paula, and sister, Hayley, attended his 2024 MLB debut in person.
