= Sam Huff (baseball) =

American baseball player (born 1998)

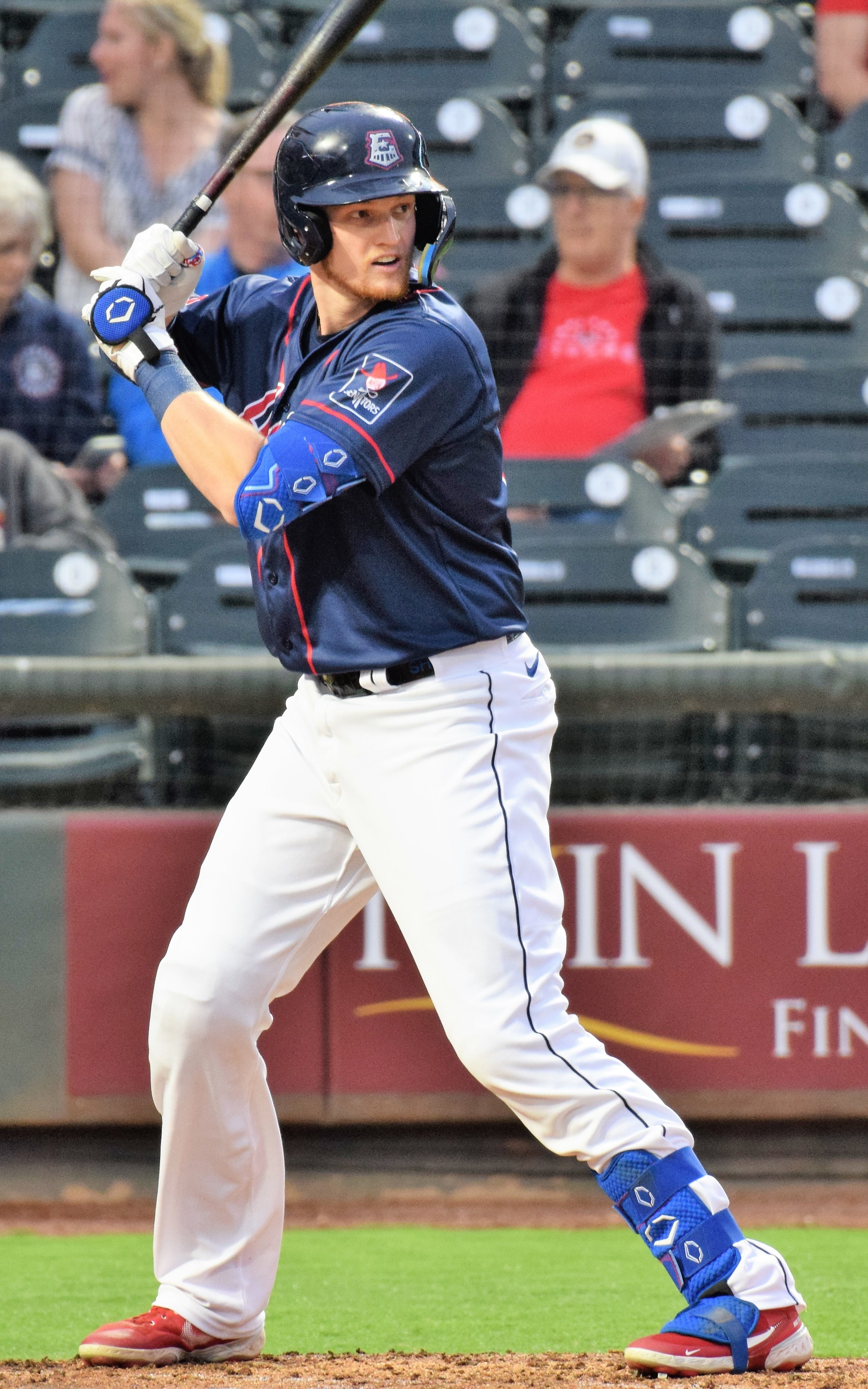
- Huff with the Round Rock Express in 2022

Free agent
- Catcher
- Born: January 14, 1998 (age 28); Phoenix, Arizona, U.S.
- Bats: Right Throws: Right

MLB debut
- September 11, 2020, for the Texas Rangers

MLB statistics (through 2026 season)
- Batting average: .232
- Home runs: 12
- Runs batted in: 25
- Stats at Baseball Reference

Teams
- Texas Rangers (2020, 2022–2024); San Francisco Giants (2025); Baltimore Orioles (2026)

Samuel Nicholas Huff (born January 14, 1998) is an American professional baseball catcher who is a free agent. He has previously played in Major League Baseball (MLB) for the Texas Rangers, San Francisco Giants, and Baltimore Orioles. He made his MLB debut in 2020.

== Amateur career ==
Huff attended Arcadia High School in Phoenix, Arizona. He was drafted by the Texas Rangers in the seventh round, with the 219th overall selection, of the 2016 Major League Baseball draft. He signed with the Rangers for a $225,000 signing bonus, forgoing a commitment to Grand Canyon University.

== Professional career ==
=== Texas Rangers (2016–2024) ===
==== Minor leagues ====
Huff spent his first two professional seasons with the Arizona League Rangers of the Rookie-level Arizona League, hitting .330/.436/.485 with one home run and 17 RBI in 2016, and .249/.329/.452 with nine home runs and 31 RBI in 2017. He played the 2018 season with the Hickory Crawdads of the Single–A South Atlantic League, hitting .241/.292/.439 with 18 home runs and 55 RBI. Huff opened 2019 back with Hickory, hitting .333/.368/.796 with 15 home runs and 29 RBI over 30 games. He was promoted to the Down East Wood Ducks of the High–A Carolina League on May 9. Huff was named to the 2019 All-Star Futures Game. Huff hit a two-run home run off of Ben Bowden in the seventh inning to tie the game, and was awarded the 2019 Futures Game Larry Doby Most Valuable Player award. Huff has named a 2019 Carolina League Year-End All-Star. Huff produced a .262/.326/.425 slash line with 13 home runs and 43 RBI for Down East.

==== Major leagues ====
On September 10, 2020, the Rangers selected Huff's contract and promoted him to the major leagues for the first time. He made his major league debut the next day against the Oakland Athletics. In 10 games for Texas in 2020, Huff hit .355/.394/.742 with three home runs and four RBI.

On April 23, 2021, it was announced that Huff would undergo surgery on April 28 to remove a "loose body" from his right knee, requiring eight weeks of recovery. On May 4, Huff was placed on the 60-day injured list as he recovered from the surgery. On July 17, Huff was activated off of the injured list.

Huff played 46 games in Double-A with the Frisco RoughRiders prior to being promoted to Triple-A Round Rock on September 23, 2021. In Frisco he hit an average of .237 with 10 home runs and 23 runs batted in. Following the 2021 season, Huff played for the Surprise Saguaros of the Arizona Fall League. Huff split the 2022 season between Texas and Round Rock. With Texas, he hit 240/.303/.372 with four home runs and 10 RBI over 44 games; with Round Rock, Huff hit .260/.336/.533 with 21 home runs and 50 RBI over 63 games played.

Huff was optioned to Triple-A Round Rock to begin the 2023 season. He played in 21 games for Texas. batting .256/.289/.512 with 3 home runs and 6 RBI. Huff was again optioned to Triple–A Round Rock to begin the 2024 season. He appeared in only 3 games for Texas in 2024, going 0–for–3 with 1 walk. Huff was designated for assignment by the Rangers on December 23, 2024.

=== San Francisco Giants (2025) ===
On January 8, 2025, Huff was claimed off waivers by the San Francisco Giants. In 20 appearances for San Francisco, he batted .208/.259/.340 with two home runs and four RBI. Huff was designated for assignment by the Giants on June 4. He cleared waivers and was sent outright to the Triple-A Sacramento River Cats on June 7. Huff elected free agency following the season on November 6.

=== Baltimore Orioles (2026–present) ===
On January 15, 2026, Huff signed a minor league contract with the Baltimore Orioles. He was assigned to the Triple-A Norfolk Tides to begin the regular season. On April 15, the Orioles selected Huff's contract, adding him to their active roster. He appeared in three games for Baltimore, going 2-for-9 (.222) with one RBI. Huff was designated for assignment by the Orioles on April 21, following Adley Rutschman's return from the injured list. He cleared waivers and elected free agency on April 25. Huff re-signed with the Orioles on a minor league contract the same day. On June 6, Baltimore selected Huff's contract, adding him back to their active roster. He recorded two hits in 14 at-bats for the Orioles prior to being designated for assignment on June 28. He cleared waivers on July 2, and elected free agency. The following day he re-signed with the Orioles on a new minor league contract. On July 19, Huff was added back to Baltimore's active roster. After going hitless across five additional appearances, Huff was designated for assignment again on July 27. He cleared waivers and was sent outright to Triple-A Norfolk on August 1. He elected free agency on September 29.
