= Jacob Heyward =

American baseball player (born 1995)

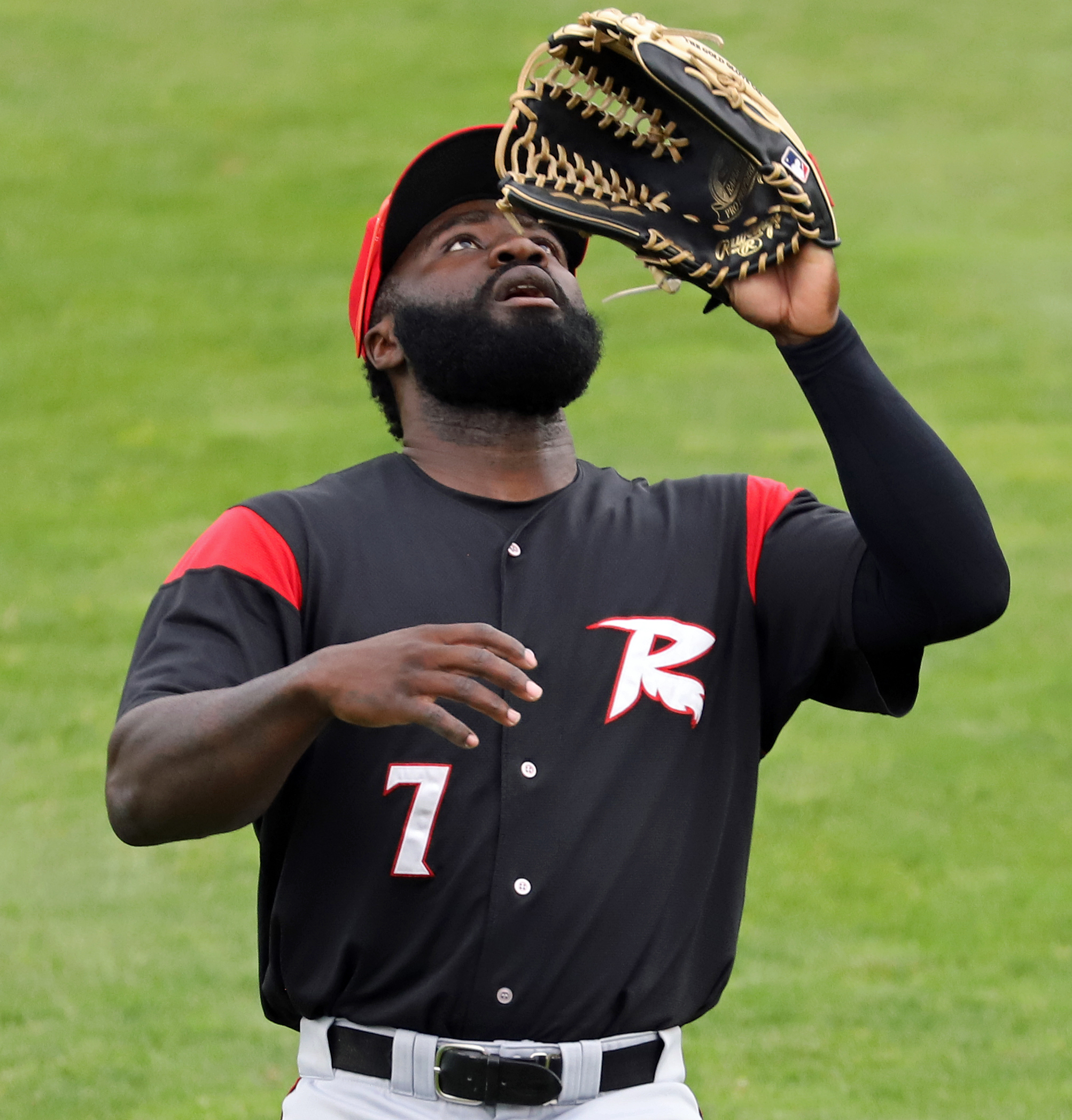
- Heyward with the Richmond Flying Squirrels in 2021
- Outfielder
- Born: August 1, 1995 (age 31); McDonough, Georgia, U.S.
- Bats: Right Throws: Right
- Stats at Baseball Reference

Jacob August Heyward (born August 1, 1995) is an American former professional baseball outfielder and current coach. He played college baseball at the University of Miami. He was selected by the San Francisco Giants in the 18th round of the 2016 Major League Baseball draft, and played with the organization through the 2022 season. Following the end of his playing career, Heyward remained with the Giants as a minor league coach.

== Amateur career ==
Heyward attended Eagle's Landing Christian Academy in McDonough, Georgia. In 2013, as a senior, he batted .331 with nine home runs and 42 RBIs and was drafted by the Atlanta Braves in the 38th round of the 2013 Major League Baseball draft. However, he did not sign and instead enrolled at the University of Miami where he played college baseball for the Miami Hurricanes.

In 2014, as a freshman at Miami, Heyward appeared in only 24 games. However, in 2015, his sophomore year, he broke out and emerged as Miami's starting left fielder, batting .327 with four home runs and 24 RBIs in 56 games. He also batted .355 in nine 2015 NCAA Division I baseball tournament games, including batting .455 in three games at the 2015 College World Series. Heyward returned in 2016 as the club's starting right fielder, hitting .242 with six home runs, 39 RBIs, and a .403 on-base percentage in 64 starts.

== Professional career ==
After his junior year, he was selected by the San Francisco Giants in the 18th round (545th overall) of the 2016 Major League Baseball draft. He signed and made his professional debut for the Rookie-level Arizona League Giants, batting .337 with one home run, 21 RBI, and ten stolen bases in 28 games. Heyward also played in four games for the Salem-Keizer Volcanoes at the end of the year. In 2017, he played for the Augusta GreenJackets where he batted .223/.317/.351 with ten home runs and 45 RBI in 107 games, and in 2018, Heyward spent a majority of the year with the San Jose Giants, hitting .258/.357/.415 with 12 home runs, 47 RBI, and 14 stolen bases in 112 games. He also played in two games for the Triple-A Sacramento River Cats to end the season.

Heyward began 2019 with the Double-A Richmond Flying Squirrels and was named an Eastern League All-Star, earning All-Star game MVP honors. He was selected to play in the Arizona Fall League for the Scottsdale Scorpions following the season. He was promoted to the Sacramento River Cats at the end of the season, and finished the year there. Over 127 games between the two clubs, Heyward slashed .211/.362/.348 with 11 home runs, 47 RBI, and 149 strikeouts in 388 at-bats.

Heyward then played for the Scottsdale Scorpions in the Arizona Fall League. He batted .184./.296/.421. Heyward did not play in a game in 2020 due to the cancellation of the minor league season because of the COVID-19 pandemic. In the 2021 season, he played for Richmond, and batted .208 with 71 strikeouts in 202 at-bats. In 2022, he returned to Richmond, and batted .201/.303/.337 with 11 home runs and 37 RBI. He elected free agency following the season on November 10, 2022.

== Coaching career ==
On March 8, 2023, the San Francisco Giants announced that Heyward had been hired to serve as the manager for one of their rookie-level affiliates. On January 15, 2026, the Giants announced that Heyward would manage their High-A affiliate, the Eugene Emeralds.

== Personal life ==
Heyward's brother, Jason, is a professional baseball outfielder.
