= Christian Koss =

American baseball player (born 1998)

Tampa Bay Rays
- Infielder
- Born: January 27, 1998 (age 28); Riverside, California, U.S.
- Bats: Right Throws: Right

MLB debut
- April 1, 2025, for the San Francisco Giants

MLB statistics (through 2026 season)
- Batting average: .239
- Home runs: 7
- Runs batted in: 35
- Stats at Baseball Reference

Teams
- San Francisco Giants (2025–2026)

Christian Koss (born January 27, 1998) is an American professional baseball infielder for the Tampa Bay Rays of Major League Baseball (MLB). He made his MLB debut in 2025 with the San Francisco Giants.

== Early life ==
Koss was born and grew up in Riverside, California, and attended John W. North High School. Koss attended the University of California, Irvine, and played college baseball for the UC Irvine Anteaters for three seasons. Following his freshman and sophomore seasons, he played collegiate summer baseball with the Yarmouth–Dennis Red Sox of the Cape Cod Baseball League and was named a league All-Star in 2018. Koss batted .307 with five home runs and 30 RBI in 54 games as a junior.

== Professional career ==
=== Colorado Rockies ===
Koss was drafted by the Colorado Rockies in the 12th round, with the 369th overall selection, of the 2019 Major League Baseball draft. He was subsequently assigned to the rookie-level Grand Junction Rockies, where he batted .332 with 11 home runs, 11 doubles, four triples, and 51 RBI. Koss did not play in a game in 2020 due to the cancellation of the minor league season because of the COVID-19 pandemic.

=== Boston Red Sox ===
On December 4, 2020, Koss was traded to the Boston Red Sox in exchange for Yoan Aybar. Koss spent the 2021 season with the High-A Greenville Drive and batted .271/.325/.451 with 15 home runs, 55 RBI, and 10 stolen bases across 104 games.

Koss was named to the Red Sox' 2022 spring training roster as a non-roster invitee. He began the season in Double-A with the Portland Sea Dogs. For the year, he played 125 total games for Portland, batting .260 with 17 home runs and 84 RBI. In 2023, Koss split time between Portland, the Triple-A Worcester Red Sox, and the rookie-level Florida Complex League Red Sox, batting a combined .235 with four home runs and 23 RBI in 79 games.

=== San Francisco Giants ===
On March 27, 2024, Koss was traded to the San Francisco Giants organization. He split the year between the rookie-level Arizona Complex League Giants, Double-A Richmond Flying Squirrels, and Triple-A Sacramento River Cats. In 88 appearances for the three affiliates, Koss batted a combined .299/.376/.496 with nine home runs, 47 RBI, and 13 stolen bases.

On March 26, 2025, the Giants selected Koss' contract after he made the team's Opening Day roster. On April 22, he made his first career pitching appearance, recording a scoreless inning of relief during an 11–3 blowout loss to the Milwaukee Brewers. On April 27, Koss recorded his first MLB run batted in with a single off of Texas Rangers reliever Jacob Latz, which scored Heliot Ramos. On May 13, Koss hit a go-ahead grand slam in the second inning of a game against the Arizona Diamondbacks. The hit, off of Brandon Pfaadt, was Koss' first career home run.

On June 2, 2026, Koss was diagnosed with a broken left wrist. On September 5, he had his first multi–homer game, hitting two home runs off New York Mets starter Zac Thornton. On November 17, the Giants designated Koss for assignment.

=== Tampa Bay Rays ===
On November 20, 2026, Koss was taded to the Tampa Bay Rays in exchange for minor league pitcher Cole Stokes.

== Personal life ==
Koss and his wife, Lauren, have one daughter.
