= Casey Schmitt =

American baseball player (born 1999)

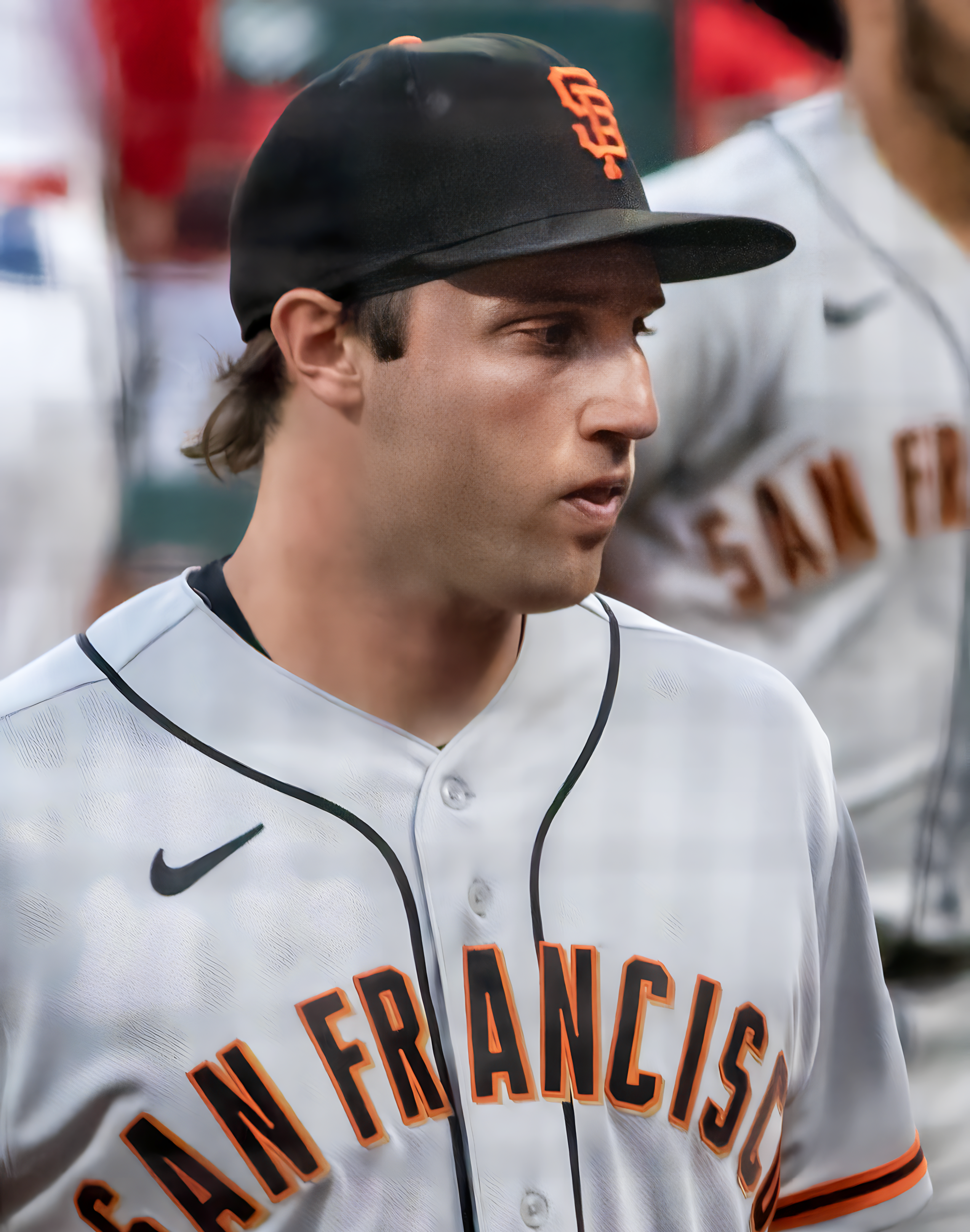
- Schmitt with the Giants in 2023

San Francisco Giants – No. 10
- Utility player
- Born: March 1, 1999 (age 27); San Diego, California, U.S.
- Bats: Right Throws: Right

MLB debut
- May 9, 2023, for the San Francisco Giants

MLB statistics (through 2026 season)
- Batting average: .244
- Home runs: 44
- Runs batted in: 141
- Stats at Baseball Reference

Teams
- San Francisco Giants (2023–present)

Casey Shawn Schmitt (born March 1, 1999) is an American professional baseball utility player for the San Francisco Giants of Major League Baseball (MLB). Schmitt played college baseball at San Diego State as both a pitcher and a third baseman. He was selected in the second round of the 2020 MLB draft by the Giants, and in 2022 he was named a Minor League Baseball Gold Glove, as the best defensive third baseman in the minor leagues. He made his MLB debut in 2023.

== Early life ==
Schmitt was born to Dan and Tina Schmitt and grew up in San Diego, California. He has one older brother named Nick. He attended Eastlake High School ('17) in Chula Vista, California, where he played baseball and was captain of the team in his senior year. He was Perfect Game Underclass High Honorable Mention in 2015 and 2016, batted .500 as a junior, and was named the 2016 Mesa League Athlete of the Year. In 2017 he was named Rawlings/Perfect Game All-America honorable mention, Perfect Game California All-Region First Team, and the third-best outfielder in California.

== College ==
Schmitt attended San Diego State University and played college baseball for the San Diego State Aztecs for three seasons as both a relief pitcher with a low-90s fastball and a third baseman. As a freshman, he set a school record with an 0.28 earned run average (ERA) and had nine saves and 24 strikeouts in 32 innings pitched. He was named a freshman First Team All-American by Baseball America and Collegiate Baseball Newspaper, and was named Mountain West Conference Championships Most Valuable Player.

As a sophomore, Schmitt was named second-team All-Mountain West Conference, after batting .315/.415/.450 in 200 at bats with 42 runs, five home runs, and 36 runs batted in (RBIs). and posting a 3–3 win–loss record with a 3.77 ERA, eight saves, and 44 strikeouts in 43 innings pitched. After the 2019 season, Schmitt played collegiate summer baseball for the Cotuit Kettleers of the Cape Cod Baseball League, where he was named a league all-star and the league's playoff most valuable player.

As a junior in 2020, Schmitt batted .323/.386/.452 with four doubles and two triples in 16 games, while tying for the national lead with six saves, before the season was cut short due to the coronavirus pandemic. He was named 2020 All-Mountain West. In his college career he played 126 games at third base, 6 games at shortstop, and 2 games at second base while pitching in 45 games (4 as a starter).

== Professional career ==
=== Minor leagues ===
The San Francisco Giants selected Schmitt in the second round (49th pick overall) of the 2020 Major League Baseball draft, and paid him a $1.15 million signing bonus. The Giants drafted him with the intention of him focusing solely on playing third base. Schmitt played third base for the San Jose Giants of Low-A West for the 2021 season and batted .247/.318/.406 in 251 at bats, with 36 runs, eight home runs, and 29 RBIs before suffering a season-ending injury in August, when a pitch fractured his left wrist. Baseball America named him the best infield arm and the best defensive infielder in the Giants system.

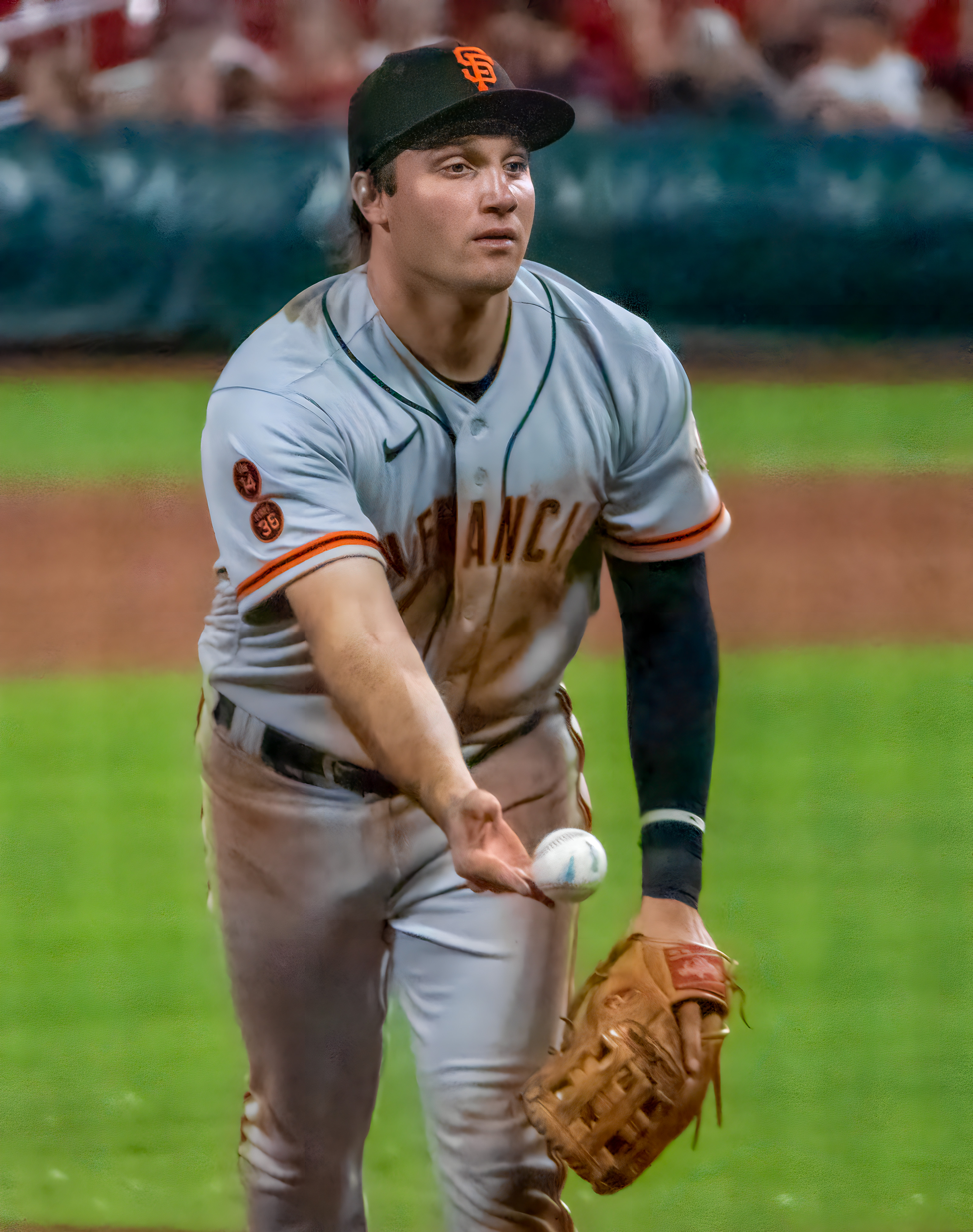
Schmitt makes a toss in St. Louis, 2023.

In 2022, playing for the High-A Eugene Emeralds, Double-A Richmond Flying Squirrels, and Triple-A Sacramento River Cats, Schmitt batted .293/.365/.489 in 468 at bats with 21 home runs and 78 RBIs. He played 83 games at third base, and also played 40 games at shortstop. With Eugene, in 333 at bats he was 7th in the Northwest League with 58 runs and 59 RBIs, and 3rd with 17 home runs. He was named an Northwest League post-season All Star, and a Pacific Coast League Gold Glove Award winner. Baseball America again named him the best infield arm and the best defensive infielder in the Giants system. He was also named the 2022 Minor League Baseball Gold Glove, as the best defensive third baseman in the minor leagues.

Schmitt was assigned to Triple-A Sacramento to begin the 2023 season. In 32 games, he batted .313/.352/.410 with one home run, 22 RBIs, and three stolen bases. He played 20 games at shortstop, 9 games at third base, and 3 games at second base.

=== Major leagues ===
On May 9, 2023, Schmitt was selected to the 40-man roster and made his major league debut. That same day, he hit his first major league home run, off Patrick Corbin of the Washington Nationals. In his first three games in the majors, Schmitt joined Willie McCovey as the only two players in franchise history to have eight hits in their first three games, he joined Joe DiMaggio as the only two players with at least eight hits, four RBI, and four runs scored in their first three games since the RBI became an official MLB stat in 1920, and he became the first shortstop in the modern era to have three straight multi-hit games to begin his career with each game including at least one extra-base hit. In 90 games during his rookie campaign, Schmitt batted .206/.256/.324 with five home runs and 30 RBI.

On February 20, 2024 Schmitt officially changed his number from 6 to 10 due to manager Bob Melvin taking 6. Schmitt was optioned to Triple–A Sacramento to begin the 2024 season, but was later called up on May 10th.

In June 2025, Schmitt became the first player in Giants history to hit two grand slams in consecutive games, doing so both times against the Los Angeles Dodgers. The first was against Dodgers ace Yoshinobu Yamamoto and the latter off position player Enrique Hernández. He made 95 appearances for San Francisco during the year, batting .237/.305/.401 with career-highs in home runs (12) and RBI (40). On December 2, Schmitt underwent surgery to remove a carpal boss from his left wrist.

Schmitt made 98 appearances for San Francisco during the 2026 campaign, batting .271/.301/.483 with 21 home runs, 55 RBI, and nine stolen bases. On July 28, 2026, Schmitt was placed on the injured list due to a torn meniscus in his left knee.
