= Arizona Complex League Giants =

- (1991–1994, 2000–present); Scottsdale, Arizona

Minor league affiliations
- Class: Rookie
- League: Arizona Complex League
- Division: East
- Previous leagues: Arizona League (1991–1994, 2000–2020)

Major league affiliations
- Team: San Francisco Giants

Minor league titles
- League titles (1): 2022 (ACL Giants Black)
- Division titles (3): 2010; 2022 (ACL Giants Black); 2025

Team data
- Name: ACL Giants
- Previous names: ACL Giants Black & Orange (2021–2023); AZL Giants Black & Orange (2018–2020); AZL Giants (1991–1994, 2000–2017)
- Ballpark: Scottsdale Stadium (2005–present)
- Owner/ Operator: San Francisco Giants
- Manager: Black: Jose Montilla; Orange: Jacob Heyward

The Arizona Complex League Giants are a professional baseball team competing as a Rookie-level affiliate of the San Francisco Giants in the Arizona Complex League of Minor League Baseball. The team plays its home games at Scottsdale Stadium in Scottsdale, Arizona. The team is composed mainly of players who are in their first year of professional baseball either as draftees or non-drafted free agents from the United States, Canada, Dominican Republic, Venezuela, and other countries.

== History ==
The team first competed in the Arizona League from 1991 to 1994, then was absent from the league until 2000. The team has been a member of the league continuously since 2000, fielding two squads in the league since 2018. The two squads are differentiated by Black and Orange suffixes. Prior to the 2021 season, the Arizona League was renamed as the Arizona Complex League (ACL).

The team played select games at their parent club's former minor league clubhouse at Indian School Park in Scottsdale up to 2019. Presently, select games are played at the Papago Park Baseball Complex in Phoenix where the recently built Giants Player Development Center is located (completed in 2022).

== Rosters ==
Arizona Complex League Giants roster
Players	Coaches/Other
Pitchers: -- Ben Bybee; 47 Samir Chires; -- Cody Delvecchio; 50 Marlon Franco; 43 Alexander Fuentes; 49 Alix Hernandez; -- Garrett Langrell; -- Chen-Hsun Lee; -- Cooper McGrath; -- Luke Mensik; 38 Jose Rengel; -- Braydon Risley; 40 Johan Rodriguez; -- Trey Seeley; -- Reid Worley; 53 Nien-Hsi Yang; Catchers: -- Junior Barajas; 18 Santiago Camacho; -- Broeddy Poppell; Infielders: -- Isaiah Barkett; -- Hayden Jatczak; Outfielders: 33 Rayner Arias; 5 Angel Guzman; 17 Andy Polanco; 13 Oliver Tejada	Manager Coaches: 23 Michael Blatchford (hitting); 26 Dalton Hurd (hitting); 39 Joel Johnson (fundamentals); 7-day injured list; * On San Francisco Giants 40-man roster; ~ Development list; # Rehab assignment; ∞ Reserve list; ‡ Restricted list; § Suspended list; † Temporarily inactive list; Roster updated March 28, 2026; Transactions; → More rosters: MiLB • Arizona Complex League; → San Francisco Giants minor league players

== Notable players ==
- Luis Matos (born 2002), outfielder for the San Francisco Giants
- Wade Meckler (born 2000), outfielder for the San Francisco Giants
- Hayden Birdsong (born 2001), pitcher for the San Francisco Giants
