= 2026 San Francisco Giants season =

2026 San Francisco Giants
- League: National League
- Division: West
- Ballpark: Oracle Park
- City: San Francisco, California
- Record: 65–97 (.401)
- Divisional place: 4th
- Owners: Charles B. Johnson (Majority shareholder); Greg E. Johnson (Chairman)
- President: Larry Baer
- President of baseball operations: Buster Posey
- General manager: Zack Minasian
- Manager: Tony Vitello
- Television: NBC Sports Bay Area/KNTV
- Radio: KNBR (104.5 FM and 680 AM)
- Stats: ESPN.com; Baseball Reference

The 2026 San Francisco Giants season was the 144th season for the franchise in Major League Baseball, their 69th year in San Francisco, and their 27th at Oracle Park.

This is the second season under President of Baseball Operations Buster Posey and general manager Zack Minasian and the first under new manager Tony Vitello, who is the first manager hired without any experience as a professional coach.

This was the last season for color analyst Mike Krukow, having spent 36 years in the Giants' broadcast booth as one half of popular "Kruk and Kuip" duo.

The Giants entered the season as playoff hopefuls, but started 6–12, their worst start since 2017. This included an opening weekend sweep by the New York Yankees, marking nine consecutive losses against them at Oracle Park. Despite pulling within two games of .500 at the end of April, the Giants never managed to cross that mark, going the full season without spending a day at or above for the first time since the 2017 season. On September 6, the Giants were eliminated from playoff contention for the 5th straight season.

On September 26, the Giants used reliever Camilo Doval out of the bullpen, becoming the 71st player to make an appearance for the team during the 2026 season. This tied the Major League record for most players used by a single team in a season, shared with the 2025 Atlanta Braves. At the end of the season, the Giants harbored 17 players on the 60-day injured list (IL), breaking a mark set by the 2021 Texas Rangers for most players on the 60-day IL at one time.

The Giants finished the season with a record of 65–97, for 4th place in the NL West.

== Offseason ==
=== Managerial change ===
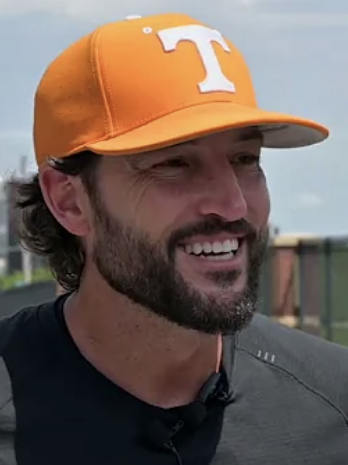
Manager Tony Vitello was hired on October 22.

Following the conclusion of the team's season, it was announced that manager Bob Melvin had been relieved of his duties. He finished his tenure with a 161–163 (.497) record in two seasons. The Giants were reported to interviewed longtime catcher and Los Angeles Angels front office special advisor Kurt Suzuki, former Baltimore Orioles manager Brandon Hyde, Kansas City Royals third-base coach Vance Wilson and former-Giants catcher Nick Hundley. However, on October 22, 2025, the Giants opted to hire University of Tennessee head coach Tony Vitello as their new manager, marking the first time a big league team has hired a manager directly from a college program without any experience as a professional coach.

=== Coaching staff changes ===
2026 San Francisco Giants coaching staff changes
Position	Previous coach(es)	Vacancy reason	Replacement(s)	Source(s)
Bench coach	Ryan Christenson, 2024–2025	Hired by the Athletics	Jayce Tingler	
Hitting coach	Pat Burrell, 2024–2025	Not retained	Hunter Mense	
Pitching coach	J.P. Martinez, 2025	Hired by the Atlanta Braves	Justin Meccage	
First base coach	Mark Hallberg, 2024–2025	Hired by the Minnesota Twins	Shane Robinson	
Third base coach	Matt Williams, 2024–2025	Not retained	Héctor Borg	
Third base coach	Héctor Borg, 2026	Reassigned	Ron Wotus (Interim, May 29–June 2); Gary Pettis (June 2–present)	
Bullpen coach	Garvin Alston, 2024–2025	Not retained	Jesse Chavez	
Assistant hitting coach	Damon Minor, 2025	Not retained	Vacant (Note: Previously shared with Oscar Benard, who remains as the lone Assistant hitting coach)	
Pitching director	Vacant (Note: Previously held by Brian Bannister from 2020–2023, left vacant since)		Frank Anderson	
Infield coach	Vacant		Ron Washington	

== Transactions ==
=== 2025 ===
==== November ====
- November 3, 2025 − The Giants declined to exercise their option on C Tom Murphy, allowing him to become a free agent.
- November 6, 2025 − The Giants claimed LHP Reiver Sanmartín and OF Justin Dean off waivers. RHP Mason Black was designated for assignment.
- November 11, 2025 − The Giants traded RHP Mason Black to the Kansas City Royals for RHP Logan Martin.
- November 21, 2025 − The Giants traded cash considerations to Miami Marlins for OF Joey Wiemer. C Andrew Knizner was designated for assignment.

==== December ====
- December 3, 2025 − The Giants signed LHP Sam Hentges to a one-year, $1.4 million contract.
- December 5, 2025 − INF Marco Luciano was claimed off waivers by the Pittsburgh Pirates.
- December 10, 2025 − The Giants traded C Miguel Caraballo and cash considerations to Minnesota Twins for C Daniel Susac.
- December 16, 2025 − The Giants signed RHP Jason Foley to a one-year, $2 million contract.
- December 17, 2025 − The Giants designated OF Joey Wiemer for assignment.
- December 19, 2025 − The Giants signed LHP Adrian Houser to a two-year, $22 million contract. OF Wade Meckler was designated for assignment.

=== 2026 ===
==== January ====
- January 5, 2026 − OF Joey Wiemer was claimed off waivers by the Washington Nationals.
- January 5, 2026 − The Giants signed RHP Tyler Mahle to a one-year, $10 million contract. OF Justin Dean was designated for assignment.
- January 7, 2026 − OF Wade Meckler was claimed off waivers by the Los Angeles Angels.
- January 13, 2026 − OF Justin Dean was claimed off waivers by the Chicago Cubs.
- January 22, 2026 − The Giants traded C Carlos Martinez to the Miami Marlins for international bonus pool money.
- January 29, 2026 − The Giants traded RHP Kai-Wei Teng to the Houston Astros for C Jancel Villarroel and international bonus pool money.
- January 30, 2026 − The Giants signed OF Harrison Bader to a two-year, $20.5 million contract.

==== February ====
- February 10, 2026 − The Giants signed INF Luis Arráez to a one-year, $12 million contract.
- February 13, 2026 − The Giants signed RHP Rowan Wick to a one-year, $780,000 contract with a $800,000 club option with a $100,000 buyout for 2027.
- February 15, 2026 − The Giants signed OF Will Brennan to a one-year, $900,000 contract.

==== March ====
- March 21, 2026 − The Giants signed LHP Ryan Borucki to a one-year, $1.5 million contract.
- March 25, 2026 − The Giants selected the contracts of RHP Caleb Kilian and OF Jared Oliva and designated OF Luis Matos for assignment.
- March 30, 2026 − The Giants acquired RHP Dylan Smith from the Detroit Tigers in exchange for cash considerations.
- March 30, 2026 − The Giants traded OF Luis Matos to the Milwaukee Brewers for cash considerations. IF Tyler Fitzgerald was designated for assignment.

==== April ====
- April 4, 2026 − The Giants traded INF Tyler Fitzgerald to the Toronto Blue Jays in exchange for cash considerations.
- April 15, 2026 − The Giants called up OFs Will Brennan and Drew Gilbert, placing OFs Harrison Bader and Jared Oliva on the 10-day IL
- April 21, 2026 − The Giants selected the contract of C Eric Haase. C Daniel Susac was placed on the 10-day injured list (IL) and RHP José Buttó was transferred to the 60-day IL.
- April 29, 2026 − The Giants selected the contract of RHP Gregory Santos. RHP Blade Tidwell was optioned and OF Jared Oliva was transferred to the 60-day IL.

==== May ====
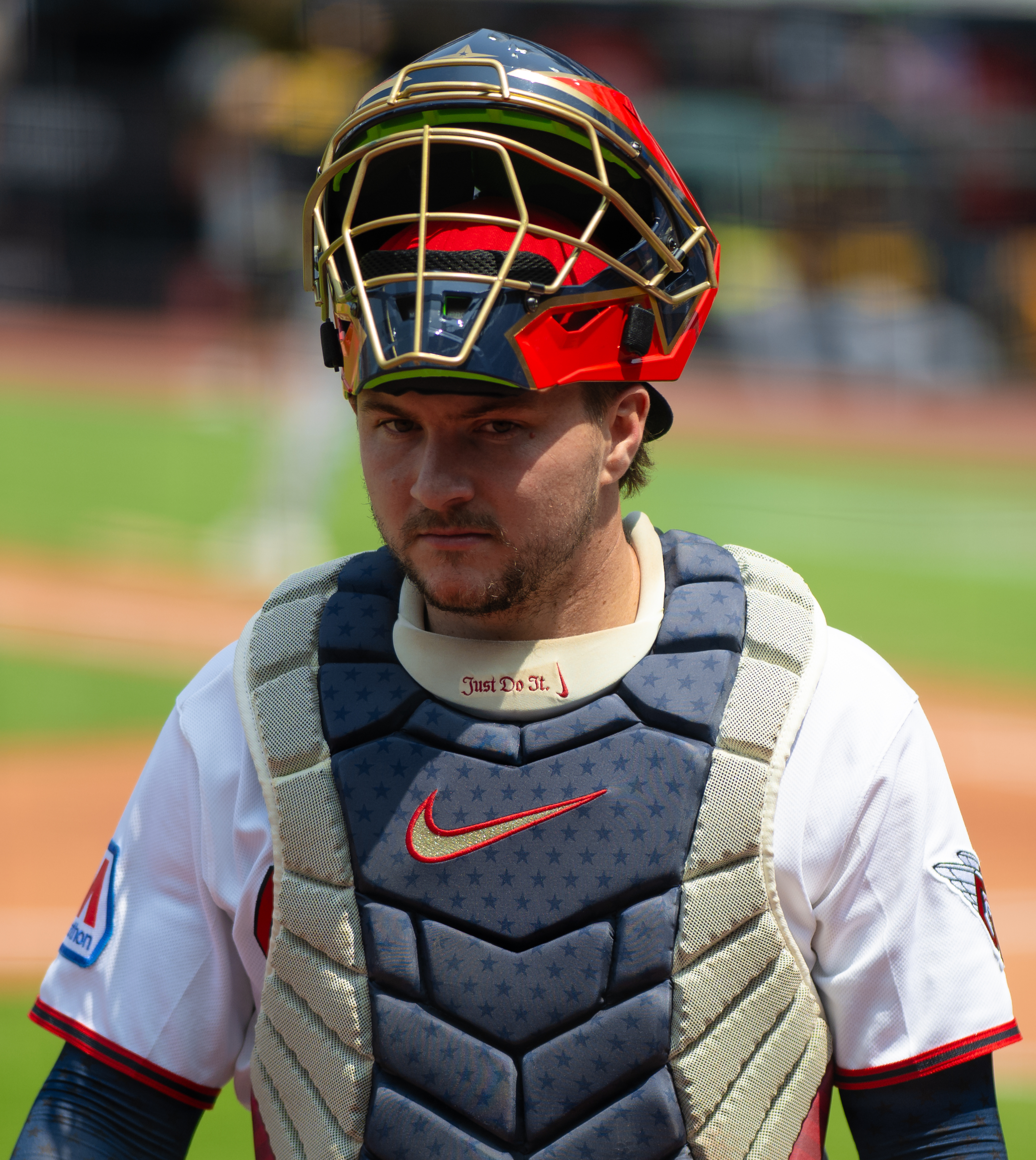
Catcher Patrick Bailey was traded to the Cleveland Guardians on May 9.

- May 4, 2026 − The Giants recalled RHP Trevor McDonald, DH Bryce Eldridge and C Jesús Rodríguez, placed LHP Erik Miller on the 15-day IL, optioned OF Will Brennan and designated OF Jerar Encarnación for assignment.
- May 5, 2026 − The Giants recalled RHP Joel Peguero and optioned RHP Trevor McDonald.
- May 9, 2026 − The Giants traded C Patrick Bailey to the Cleveland Guardians in exchange for LHP Matt Wilkinson and a Competitive Balance Round A pick (29th overall).
- May 9, 2026 − The Giants purchased the contract of C Logan Porter, recalled RHP Trevor McDonald and placed RHP Logan Webb on the 15-day IL.
- May 10, 2026 − OF Jerar Encarnación clears waivers and elects free agency.
- May 10, 2026 − The Giants activated LHP Sam Hentges, recalled RHP Dylan Smith and optioned RHPs Ryan Walker and Gregory Santos.
- May 11, 2026 − The Giants activated OF Harrison Bader, recalled RHP Tristan Beck and optioned C Logan Porter and RHP Dylan Smith.
- May 15, 2026 − The Giants activated C Daniel Susac and optioned INF Christian Koss.
- May 16, 2026 − The Giants activated LHP Erik Miller, recalled OF Will Brennan, optioned RHP Tristan Beck and placed OF Heliot Ramos on the 15-day IL.
- May 22, 2026 − The Giants placed OF Jung Hoo Lee on the 10-day IL and selected the contract of OF Víctor Bericoto.
- May 29, 2026 − The Giants activated RHP Logan Webb and OF Jung Hoo Lee from the IL, placed RHP Tyler Mahle on the 15-day IL and optioned OF Will Brennan.
- May 30, 2026 − The Giants placed OF Harrison Bader on the 10-day IL and recalled OF Will Brennan.
- May 31, 2026 − The Giants designated LHP Ryan Borucki for assignment, recalled RHP Tristan Beck, optioned OF Will Brennan and selected the contract of OF Jonah Cox.

==== June ====
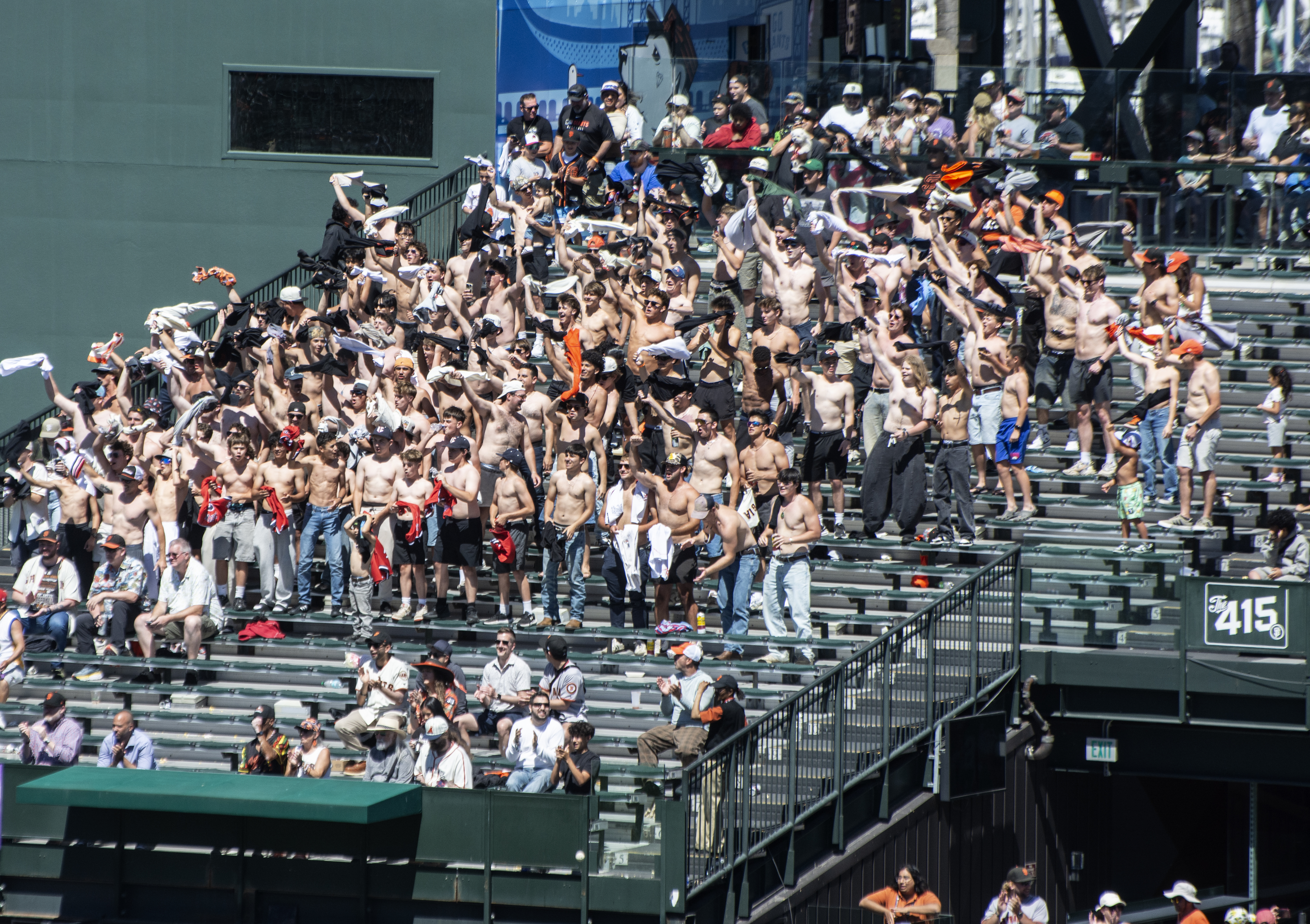
Fans at Oracle Park with "Tarps Off", June 2026

- June 1, 2026 − The Giants selected the contracts of INF Buddy Kennedy and RHP Wilkin Ramos, optioned C Jesús Rodríguez, placed RHP Joel Peguero the 60-day IL and designated C Logan Porter for assignment.
- June 3, 2026 − The Giants recalled RHP Dylan Smith and placed LHP Matt Gage on the 15-day IL.
- June 4, 2026 − C Logan Porter elected free agency.
- June 5, 2026 − The Giants optioned RHP Wilkin Ramos and recalled RHP Carson Seymour.
- June 6, 2026 − LHP Ryan Borucki was released.
- June 10, 2026 − The Giants optioned RHP Tristan Beck, activated LHP Reiver Sanmartín and designated OF Will Brennan for assignment.
- June 12, 2026 − The Giants recalled RHP Ryan Walker and optioned RHP Carson Seymour.
- June 14, 2026 − The Giants placed RHP Keaton Winn on the 15-day IL and recalled RHP Tristan Beck.
- June 17, 2026 − The Giants activated LHP Matt Gage from the 15-day IL, outrighted OF Will Brennan and recalled LHP Carson Whisenhunt and optioned LHP Reiver Sanmartín.
- June 18, 2026 − LHP Carson Whisenhunt was optioned.
- June 20, 2026 − OF Jared Oliva was designated for assignment.
- June 23, 2026 − OF Jared Oliva was claimed off waivers by the New York Mets.
- June 24, 2026 − The Giants activated RHP Tyler Mahle from the 15-day IL and optioned RHP Tristan Beck.
- June 26, 2026 − The Giants placed C Daniel Susac on the 10-day IL, selected the contract of C Drew Cavanaugh and designated RHP Wilkin Ramos for assignment.
- June 28, 2026 − The Giants activated OF Heliot Ramos from the 10-day IL and designated INF Buddy Kennedy for assignment.
- June 29, 2026 − The Giants traded INF Buddy Kennedy to the Seattle Mariners for cash considerations.

==== July ====
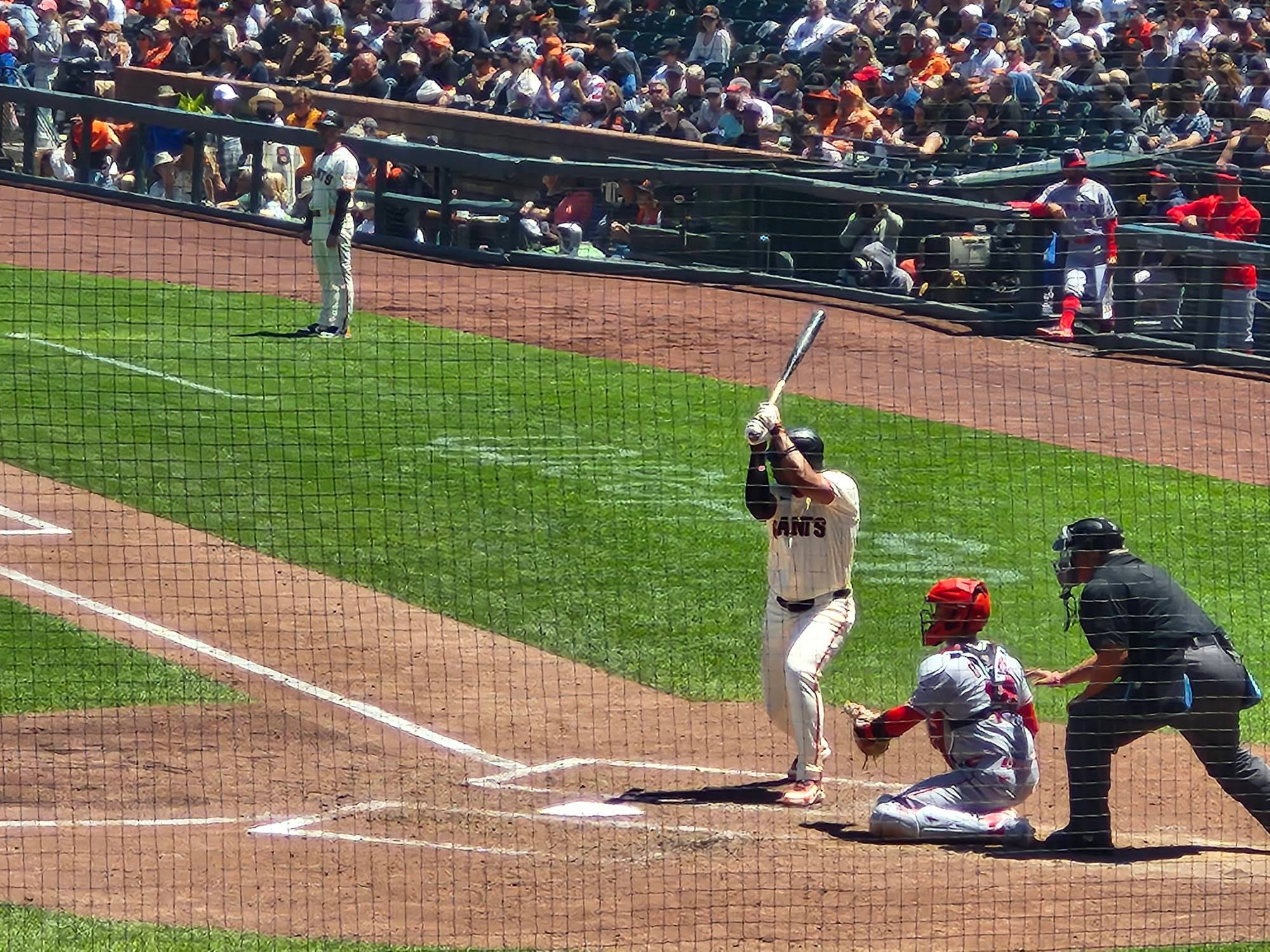
Rafael Devers hitting against the Los Angeles Angels on July 26.

- July 1, 2026 − The Giants placed INF Matt Chapman on the 10-day IL and recalled INF Christian Koss.
- July 2, 2026 − The Giants outrighted RHP Wilkin Ramos to AAA.
- July 4, 2026 − The Giants placed LHP Matt Gage on the 15-day IL and recalled RHP Spencer Bivens.
- July 6, 2026 − The Giants claimed RHP Eric Cerantola off waivers and outrighted RHP Gregory Santos.
- July 8, 2026 − The Giants placed OF Jonah Cox on the 10-day IL and recalled C Jesús Rodríguez.
- July 8, 2026 − RHP Gregory Santos elected free agency.
- July 10, 2026 − The Giants placed OF Victor Bericoto on the 10-day IL, activated RHP Keaton Winn from the 15-day IL, optioned LHP Carson Whisenhunt and recalled OF Grant McCray.
- July 12, 2026 − The Giants activated RHP Jason Foley from the 60-day IL and optioned RHP Spencer Bivens.
- July 15, 2026 − RHP Eric Cerantola was outrighted.
- July 17, 2026 − The Giants activated C Daniel Susac from the 10-day IL and designated C Eric Haase for assignment.
- July 21, 2026 − The Giants placed RHP Trevor McDonald on the 15-day IL and recalled RHP Tristan Beck.
- July 23, 2026 − The Giants released C Eric Haase.
- July 26, 2026 − The Giants optioned RHP Tristan Beck and recalled LHP Carson Whisenhunt.
- July 28, 2026 − The Giants placed INF Casey Schmitt on the 10-day IL and selected the contract of INF Osleivis Basabe.

==== August ====
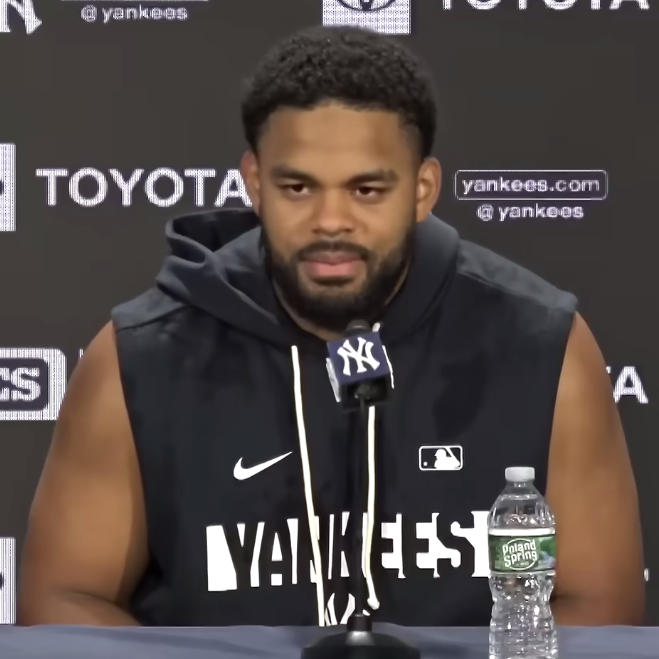
Former first-round pick Heliot Ramos was among the six players the Giants traded at the trade deadline

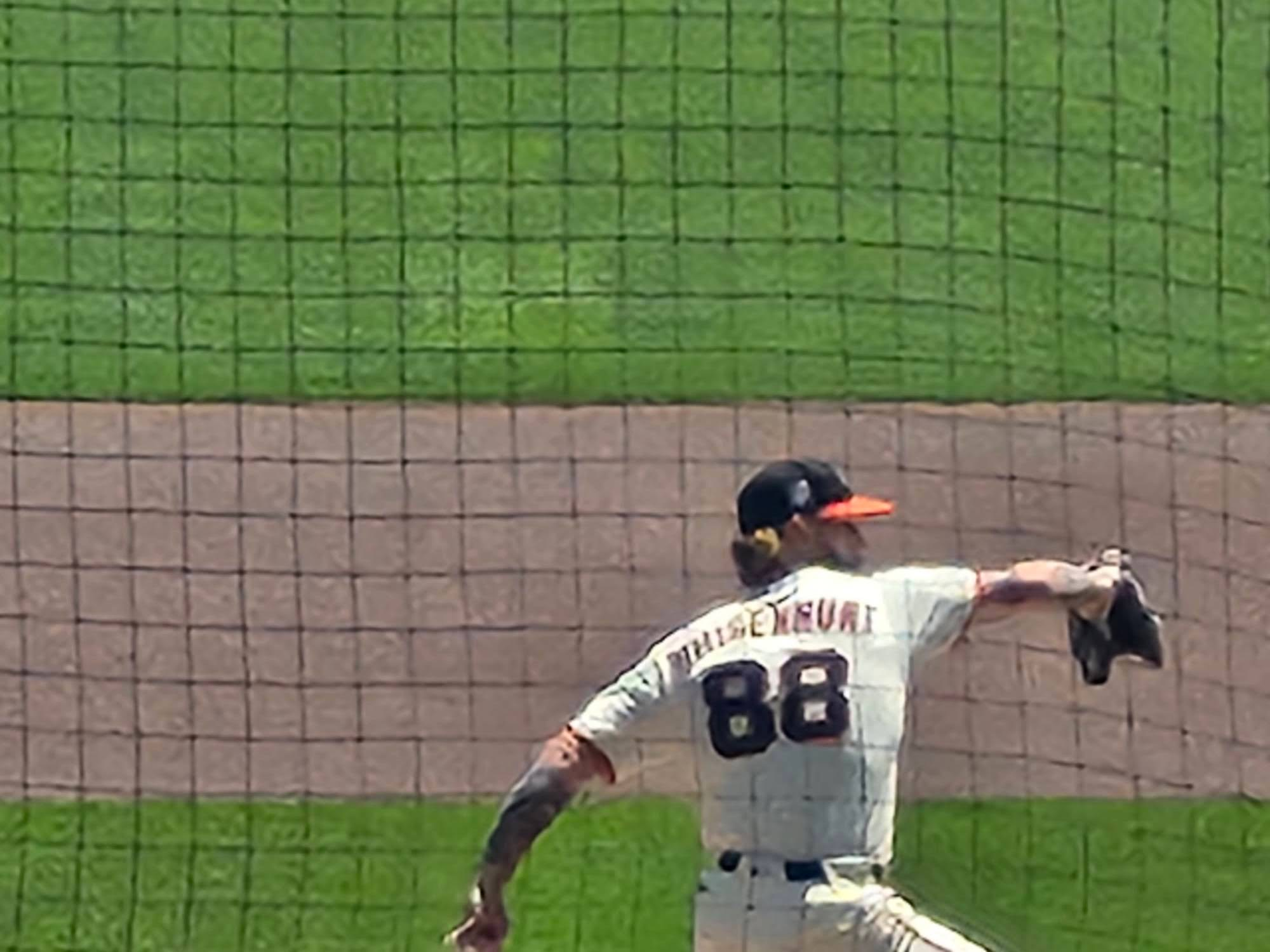
Carson Whisenhunt suffered a season-ending torn ulnar collateral ligament on August 24 and underwent Tommy John surgery on September 16

- August 1, 2026 − The Giants placed C Jesús Rodríguez on the 10-day IL and selected the contract of INF Nate Furman.
- August 2, 2026 − The Giants claimed INF Buddy Kennedy off waivers.
- August 2, 2026 − LHP Matt Gage was transferred to the 60-day IL.
- August 2, 2026 − The Giants traded RHP Tyler Mahle to the Atlanta Braves in exchange for RHP Anthony Molina.
- August 3, 2026 − The Giants traded INF Luis Arráez and RHP Caleb Kilian to the Philadelphia Phillies in exchange for RHP Ramon Marquez and RHP Marty Gair.
- August 3, 2026 − The Giants traded LHP Robbie Ray to the San Diego Padres in exchange for RHP Miguel Mendez and INF Joniel Hernandez.
- August 3, 2026 − The Giants traded OF Heliot Ramos to the New York Yankees in exchange for LHP Henry Lalane and INF Kaeden Kent.
- August 3, 2026 − The Giants traded LHP Erik Miller and OF Carlos Gutierrez to the Boston Red Sox in exchange for INF Marcelo Mayer.
- August 3, 2026 − The Giants recalled LHP Reiver Sanmartín, RHPs Tristan Beck and Carson Seymour and activated INF Buddy Kennedy.
- August 4, 2026 − The Giants selected the contract of INF Eddys Leonard and optioned OF Jonah Cox to AAA.
- August 7, 2026 − The Giants selected the contract of RHP Trent Harris and optioned RHP Tristan Beck.
- August 10, 2026 − The Giants placed C Daniel Susac on the 15-day IL and selected the contract of C Zach Morgan.
- August 11, 2026 − The Giants signed C Andrew Knizner to a one-year, $780,000 contract, activated OF Victor Bericoto, optioned C Zach Morgan and designated INF Eddys Leonard for assignment.
- August 13, 2026 − The Giants claimed INF Shay Whitcomb, selected the contract of OF Turner Hill and transferred INF Matt Chapman and RHP Trevor McDonald to the 60-day IL.
- August 14, 2026 − The Giants recalled OF Jonah Cox and optioned INF Nate Furman and OF Grant McCray.
- August 19, 2026 − The Giants claimed LHP Philip Abner off waivers.
- August 19, 2026 − The Giants selected the contract of LHP Matt Wilkinson, optioned LHP Reiver Sanmartín and transferred C Daniel Susac and OF Harrison Bader to the 60-day IL.
- August 20, 2026 − The Giants placed RHP Keaton Winn on the 15-day IL and recalled LHP Reiver Sanmartín.
- August 24, 2026 − The Giants placed DH Bryce Eldridge on the bereavement list, INF Willy Adames and OF Victor Bericoto on the 10-day IL, RHP JT Brubaker on the 15-day IL, optioned LHP Matt Wilkinson and recalled INF Nate Furman, OF Grant McCray, RHP Anthony Molina, RHP Ryan Walker and INF Shay Whitcomb.
- August 25, 2026 − The Giants placed LHP Carson Whisenhunt on the 15-day IL and recalled RHP Spencer Bivens.
- August 26, 2026 − The Giants selected the contract of RHP Braxton Roxby, placed RHP Adrian Houser on the 15-day IL and transferred LHP Carson Whisenhunt to the 60-day IL.
- August 27, 2026 − The Giants reinstated DH Bryce Eldridge from the bereavement list and designated INF Buddy Kennedy for assingment.
- August 29, 2026 − The Giants recalled LHP Matt Wilkinson, selected the contract of LHP Seth Lonsway and optioned RHP Spencer Bivens.
- August 29, 2026 − The Giants selected the contract of RHP Yunior Marte, optioned LHP Seth Lonsway and transferred INF Casey Schmitt to the 60-day IL.
- August 30, 2026 − The Giants placed LHP Sam Hentges on the 15-day IL.

==== September ====
- September 1, 2026 − The Giants recalled C Zach Morgan, selected the contract of LHP César Perdomo and transferred RHP Adrian Houser to the 60-day IL.
- September 3, 2026 − The Giants claimed INF Brett Harris off waivers and transferred RHP Keaton Winn to the 60-day IL.
- September 4, 2026 − The Giants claimed RHP Joel Kuhnel off waivers and transferred C Jesús Rodríguez to the 60-day IL.
- September 5, 2026 − The Giants recalled RHP Joel Kuhnel and optioned RHP Ryan Walker.
- September 7, 2026 − The Giants recalled LHP Philip Abner and optioned RHP Braxton Roxby.
- September 8, 2026 − The Giants recalled INF Brett Harris and optioned C Zach Morgan.
- September 9, 2026 − The Giants claimed RHP Duncan Davitt and designated RHP Spencer Bivens for assingment.
- September 12, 2026 − RHP Spencer Bivens was claimed off waivers by the Kansas City Royals.
- September 13, 2026 − The Giants selected the contract of OF Scott Bandura and placed INF Rafael Devers on the 60-day IL.
- September 18, 2026 − The Giants placed RHP Logan Webb on the 15-day IL, INF Nate Furman on the 10-day IL and recalled OF Víctor Bericoto and RHP Duncan Davitt.
- September 19, 2026 − The Giants placed LHP Reiver Sanmartín on the 15-day IL and activated LHP Sam Hentges.
- September 20, 2026 − The Giants recalled RHP Tristan Beck and optioned LHP Philip Abner.
- September 21, 2026 − The Giants activated INF Marcelo Mayer, selected the contract of OF Bo Davidson, placed DH Bryce Eldridge on the 7-day IL, OF Jung Hoo Lee on the 10-day IL and designated LHP Philip Abner for assingment.
- September 22, 2026 − The Giants placed RHP Blade Tidwell on the 15-day IL and recalled RHP Braxton Roxby.
- September 23, 2026 − LHP Philip Abner was claimed off waivers by the New York Mets.
- September 24, 2026 − The Giants claimed RHP Camilo Doval off waivers and transferred RHP Blade Tidwell to the 60-day IL.
- September 25, 2026 − The Giants activated RHP Camilo Doval and optioned LHP César Perdomo.
- September 26, 2026 − The Giants recalled LHP Seth Lonsway and optioned RHP Yunior Marte

== Spring training ==
=== World Baseball Classic ===
The 2026 World Baseball Classic (WBC) took place from March 5 to March 17, 2026. The following Giants players participated in the tournament:

Player	Position	National team
Luis Arráez	Infielder	Venezuela
Harrison Bader	Outfielder	Israel
Tristan Beck	Right-handed Pitcher	Great Britain
José Buttó	Right-handed Pitcher	Venezuela
Dayson Croes (minors)	Infielder	Netherlands
Jung-hoo Lee	Outfielder	South Korea
Heliot Ramos	Outfielder	Puerto Rico
Elian Rayo (minors)	Infielder	Nicaragua
Reiver Sanmartin	Left-handed Pitcher	Colombia
Logan Webb	Right-handed Pitcher	United States

In addition, the Giants hosted the United States in a pre-tournament warm-up game on March 3rd.

Friendly; Played over 10 innings	March 3	United States	15–1	San Francisco Giants	Scottsdale Stadium, Scottsdale, Arizona
Friendly; Played over 10 innings	13:05 MST	WP: Paul Skenes (1–0); HR: Alex Bregman (1); Roman Anthony (1)	Boxscore	LP: Adrian Houser (0–1)	Attendance: 9,720; Umpires: HP – Alfonso Márquez; 1B – Adrian Johnson; 2B – Scott Barry; 3B – Brian Walsh

=== Oracle Park Exhibition Series ===
On March 23 and March 24, 2026, the Giants hosted Mexican side Sultanes de Monterrey for a two-game exhibition series at Oracle Park. This marked the first time a Mexican club traveled to the United States to face an MLB club in an MLB ballpark.

Friendly	March 23	Sultanes de Monterrey	2–10	San Francisco Giants	Oracle Park, San Francisco
Friendly	18:46 PDT	LP: Stephen Tarpley (0–1)	Boxscore	WP: Tristan Beck (1–0); HR: Willy Adames (1); Bryce Eldridge (1); Tyler Fitzgerald (1)	Attendance: 24,830; Umpires: HP – Kellen Martin; 1B – Harley Acosta; 2B – Steven Rios Jr. 3B – Ty Krauss

Friendly	March 24	Sultanes de Monterrey	2–8	San Francisco Giants	Oracle Park, San Francisco
Friendly	18:45 PDT	LP: Justus Sheffield (0–1)	Boxscore	WP: Landen Roupp (1–0); HR: Jung-hoo Lee (1)	Attendance: 23,062; Umpires: HP – Steven Rios Jr. 1B – Ty Krauss; 2B – Kellen Martin; 3B – Harley Acosta

== Regular season ==
=== Opening day lineup ===
Order	No.	Player	Pos.
Batters
1	1	Luis Arráez	2B
2	26	Matt Chapman	3B
3	16	Rafael Devers	DH
4	2	Willy Adames	SS
5	51	Jung-hoo Lee	RF
6	17	Heliot Ramos	LF
7	10	Casey Schmitt	1B
8	14	Patrick Bailey	C
9	9	Harrison Bader	CF
Starting pitcher
—	62	Logan Webb	

=== Pride Night Controversy ===
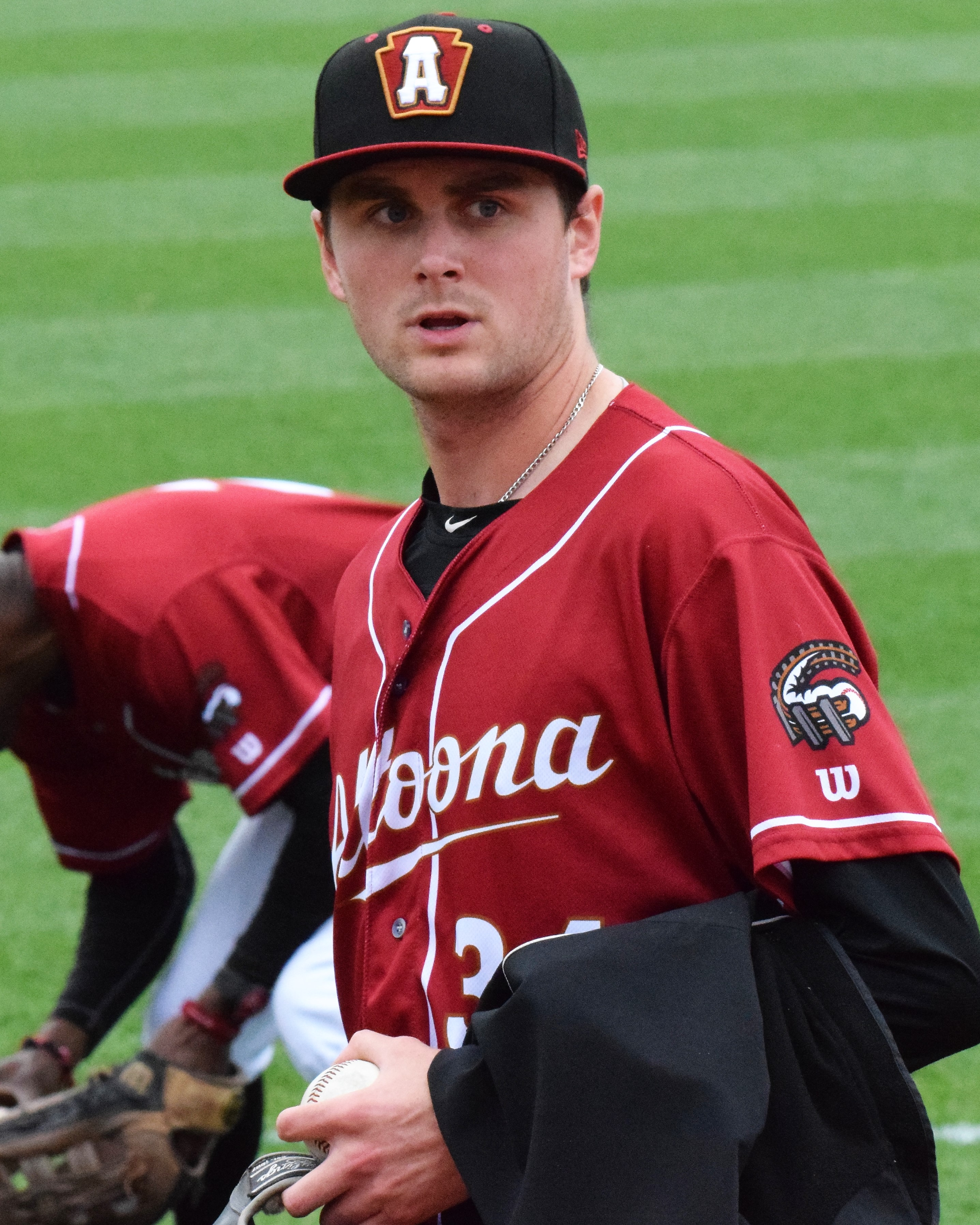
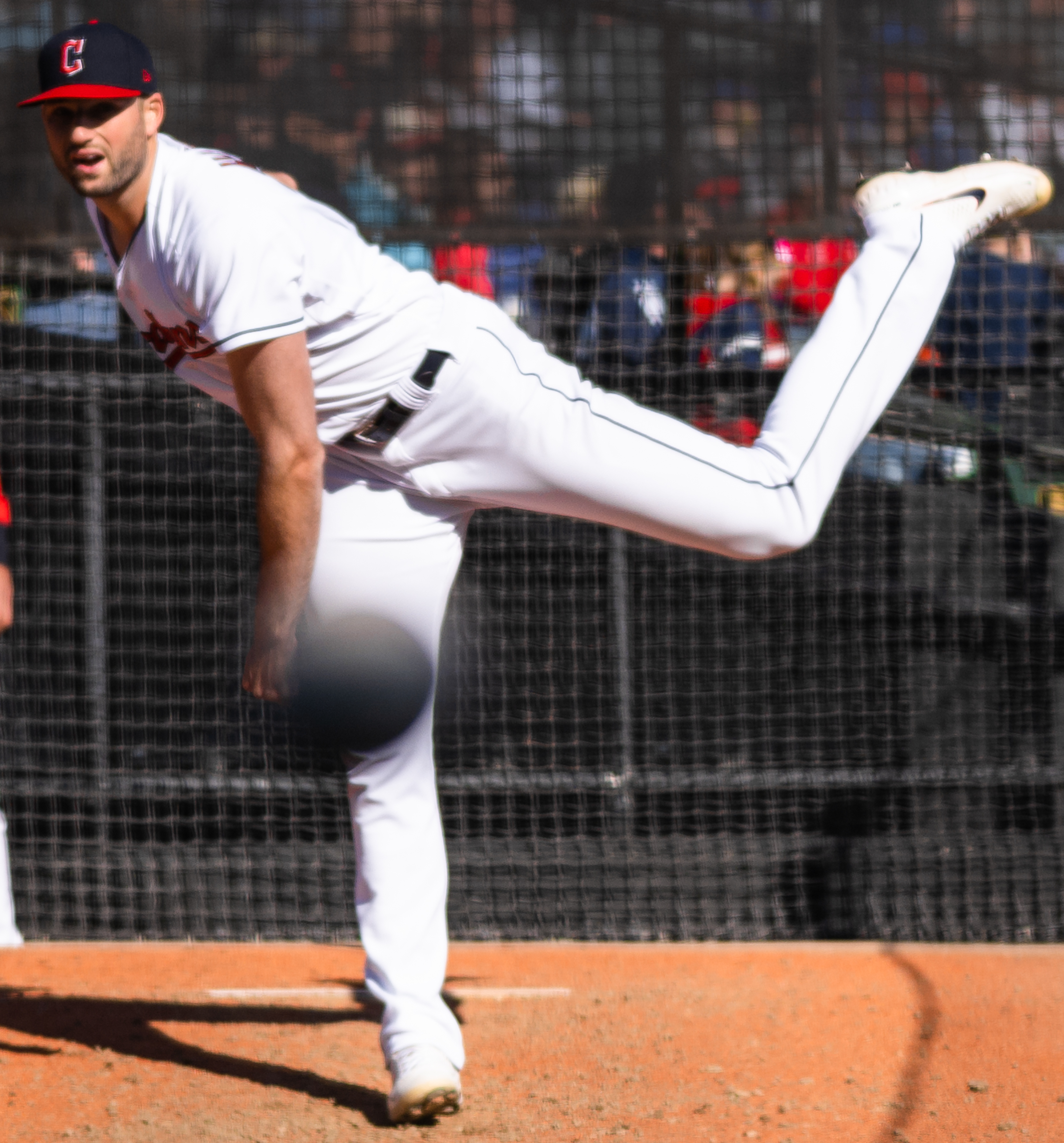
Relievers JT Brubaker and Sam Hentges were two pitchers who wrote Bible references on their hats on Pride Night, causing controversy

On June 12, the Giants hosted a Pride Night event that featured the team's logo in the colors of the Rainbow flag. Starting pitcher Landen Roupp, relievers JT Brubaker and Ryan Walker each wrote the Bible passage Genesis 9:12–16 on their respective hats, a verse that former Giant Nick Ahmed and now-retired Clayton Kershaw previously cited on their hats during previous Pride Night events, while reliever Sam Hentges opted to wear the regular hat without the rainbow logo instead. Following the game, Brubaker, Roupp and Walker were each reprimanded and issued warnings by MLB for writing on their caps. However, no further action was taken by the Giants, with manager Tony Vitello claiming it was "just kind of a general knowledge" that players "have the freedom to do what they think is best."

The players' protest drew criticism from local outlets and fans, given the region's long history with the LGBTQ community. On June 18, 2026, it was reported that the United States Department of Justice had begun a probe into MLB over its handling of the controversy.

Before the Giants' home game on June 22, several LGBTQ groups and organizations participated in a protest outside Oracle Park. On June 23, MLB commissioner Rob Manfred placed blame on the Giants organization, stating "the Giants' communication with players was inadequate and not clear." In a press conference later that day, President of baseball operations Buster Posey drew attention by refusing to take questions. A day later, in an interview on KNBR, Giants CEO and team president Larry Baer addressed the controversy, admitting the team mishandled the situation while stating the team would continue in their efforts to support the city's LGBTQ community.

=== Awards ===
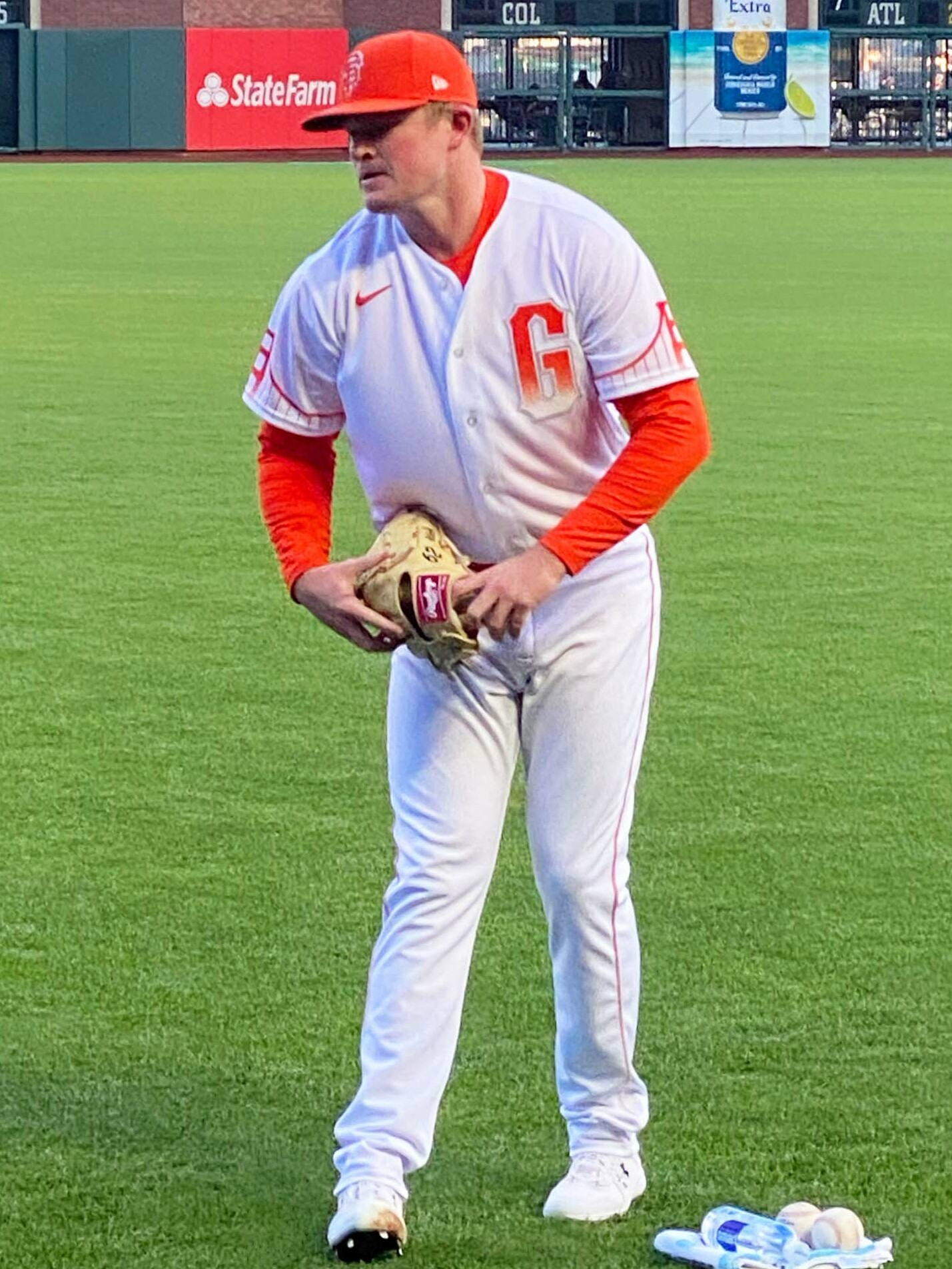
Logan Webb (pictured in 2021) was the recipient of the Willie Mac Award

Recipient	Award	Date awarded	Ref.
Logan Webb	National League Pitcher of the Month Award (June)	July 3, 2026	
Luis Arráez	2026 Major League Baseball All-Star Game	July 4, 2026	
Logan Webb	2026 Major League Baseball All-Star Game	July 4, 2026	
Rafael Devers	National League Player of the Week Award (August 31 – September 6)	September 8, 2026	
Logan Webb	Willie Mac Award	September 25, 2026	

== Season standings ==
=== National League West ===
NL West
Team	W	L	Pct.	GB	Home	Road
Los Angeles Dodgers	100	62	.617	—	51‍–‍30	49‍–‍32
San Diego Padres	91	71	.562	9	51‍–‍30	40‍–‍41
Arizona Diamondbacks	86	76	.531	14	45‍–‍36	41‍–‍40
San Francisco Giants	65	97	.401	35	37‍–‍44	28‍–‍53
Colorado Rockies	58	104	.358	42	32‍–‍49	26‍–‍55

=== National League Wild Card ===
Division leaders
Team	W	L	Pct.
Milwaukee Brewers	103	59	.636
Los Angeles Dodgers	100	62	.617
Atlanta Braves	94	68	.580

Wild Card teams (Top 3 teams qualify for postseason)
Team	W	L	Pct.	GB
San Diego Padres	91	71	.562	+3
Chicago Cubs	89	73	.549	+1
Philadelphia Phillies	88	74	.543	—
Arizona Diamondbacks	86	76	.531	2
Pittsburgh Pirates	82	80	.506	6
Miami Marlins	80	82	.494	8
St. Louis Cardinals	77	85	.475	11
Washington Nationals	77	85	.475	11
Cincinnati Reds	75	87	.463	13
New York Mets	74	88	.457	14
San Francisco Giants	65	97	.401	23
Colorado Rockies	58	104	.358	30

=== Record vs. opponents ===
2026 National League record Source: MLB Standings Grid – 2026
Team	AZ	ATL	CHC	CIN	COL	LAD	MIA	MIL	NYM	PHI	PIT	SD	SF	STL	WSH	AL
Arizona	—	4–3	2–4	4–2	9–4	7–6	1–5	2–4	4–2	3–3	3–3	6–7	10–3	5–2	2–4	24–24
Atlanta	3–4	—	3–3	3–3	6–0	5–1	9–4	3–3	6–7	9–4	5–1	3–4	1–5	2–4	9–4	27–21
Chicago	4–2	3–3	—	9–4	3–3	4–2	3–3	4–9	7–0	6–1	7–6	5–1	3–3	6–7	3–3	22–26
Cincinnati	2–4	3–3	4–9	—	4–2	1–6	3–4	4–9	4–2	3–3	6–7	3–3	3–3	5–8	1–5	29–19
Colorado	4–9	0–6	3–3	2–4	—	3–10	2–5	1–5	4–2	2–4	3–3	2–11	7–6	2–4	3–4	20–28
Los Angeles	6–7	1–5	2–4	6–1	10–3	—	2–4	3–4	5–1	4–2	5–1	8–5	9–4	2–4	6–0	31–17
Miami	5–1	4–9	3–3	4–3	5–2	4–2	—	1–5	6–7	5–8	4–2	0–6	4–2	4–2	9–4	22–26
Milwaukee	4–2	3–3	9–4	9–4	5–1	4–3	5–1	—	4–2	4–2	6–7	2–4	3–4	11–2	2–4	32–16
New York	2–4	7–6	0–7	2–4	2–4	1–5	7–6	2–4	—	6–7	4–2	4–2	5–2	2–4	7–6	23–25
Philadelphia	3–3	4–9	1–6	3–3	4–2	2–4	8–5	2–4	7–6	—	5–2	6–0	4–2	4–2	9–4	26–22
Pittsburgh	3–3	1–5	6–7	7–6	3–3	1–5	2–4	7–6	2–4	2–5	—	3–3	3–3	6–7	4–3	32–16
San Diego	7–6	4–3	1–5	3–3	11–2	5–8	6–0	4–2	2–4	0–6	3–3	—	9–4	3–4	4–2	29–19
San Francisco	3–10	5–1	3–3	3–3	6–7	4–9	2–4	4–3	2–5	2–4	3–3	4–9	—	5–1	3–3	16–32
St. Louis	2–5	4–2	7–6	8–5	4–2	4–2	2–4	2–11	4–2	2–4	7–6	4–3	1–5	—	3–3	23–25
Washington	4–2	4–9	3–3	5–1	4–3	0–6	4–9	4–2	6–7	4–9	3–4	2–4	3–3	3–3	—	28–20

Updated with the results of all games through September 27, 2026.

== Game log ==
=== Regular season ===
Legend
	Giants win
	Giants loss
	Postponement
	Eliminated from playoff race
**Bold**	Giants team member

2026 Game Log: 65–97 (Home: 37–44; Away: 28–53)
March/April: 13–18 (Home: 7–9; Away: 6–9)

#	Date	Opponent	Score	Win	Loss	Save	Stadium	Attendance	Record
1	March 25	Yankees	0–7	Fried (1–0)	**Webb** (0–1)	―	**Oracle Park**	40,856	0–1
2	March 27	Yankees	0–3	Schlittler (1–0)	**Ray** (0–1)	Bednar (1)	**Oracle Park**	40,273	0–2
3	March 28	Yankees	1–3	Bird (1–0)	**Mahle** (0–1)	Bednar (2)	**Oracle Park**	40,634	0–3
4	March 30	@ Padres	3–2	**Roupp** (1–0)	Buehler (0–1)	**Walker** (1)	Petco Park	43,611	1–3
5	March 31	@ Padres	9–3	**Webb** (1–1)	Márquez (0–1)	―	Petco Park	41,891	2–3
6	April 1	@ Padres	1–7	Pivetta (1–1)	**Houser** (0–1)	Miller (2)	Petco Park	41,491	2–4
7	April 2	Mets	7–2	**Ray** (1–1)	Peterson (0–1)	**Tidwell** (1)	**Oracle Park**	32,073	3–4
8	April 3	Mets	3–10	McLean (1–0)	**Mahle** (0–2)	―	**Oracle Park**	38,613	3–5
9	April 4	Mets	0–9	Holmes (2–0)	**Roupp** (1–1)	―	**Oracle Park**	36,553	3–6
10	April 5	Mets	2–5	Brazobán (1–0)	**Winn** (0–1)	Williams (2)	**Oracle Park**	37,079	3–7
11	April 6	Phillies	4–6	Bowlan (1–0)	**Borucki** (0–1)	Durán (4)	**Oracle Park**	32,898	3–8
12	April 7	Phillies	6–0	**Ray** (2–1)	Sánchez (1–1)	―	**Oracle Park**	32,403	4–8
13	April 8	Phillies	5–0	**Gage** (1–0)	Nola (1–1)	―	**Oracle Park**	36,106	5–8
14	April 10	@ Orioles	6–3	**Roupp** (2–1)	Baz (0–1)	―	Camden Yards	32,294	6–8
15	April 11	@ Orioles	2–6	Wolfram (1–0)	**Webb** (1–2)	―	Camden Yards	29,444	6–9
16	April 12	@ Orioles	2–6	Povich (1–0)	**Houser** (0–2)	―	Camden Yards	24,091	6–10
17	April 14	@ Reds	1–2	Singer (1–1)	**Ray** (2–2)	Pagán (5)	Great American Ball Park	20,690	6–11
18	April 15	@ Reds	3–8	Lowder (2–1)	**Mahle** (0–3)	―	Great American Ball Park	13,822	6–12
19	April 16	@ Reds	3–0	**Roupp** (3–1)	Burke (1–1)	**Miller** (1)	Great American Ball Park	16,898	7–12
20	April 17	@ Nationals	10–5	**Webb** (2–2)	Littell (0–2)	―	Nationals Park	25,108	8–12
21	April 18	@ Nationals	7–6 (12)	**Kilian** (1–0)	Pérez (1–2)	―	Nationals Park	35,527	9–12
22	April 19	@ Nationals	0–3	Alvarez (1–0)	**Ray** (2–3)	―	Nationals Park	20,026	9–13
23	April 21	Dodgers	3–1	**Roupp** (4–1)	Yamamoto (2–2)	**Walker** (2)	**Oracle Park**	40,066	10–13
24	April 22	Dodgers	3–0	**Mahle** (1–3)	Dreyer (1–1)	**Walker** (3)	**Oracle Park**	40,277	11–13
25	April 23	Dodgers	0–3	Glasnow (3–0)	**Webb** (2–2)	Scott (1)	**Oracle Park**	38,619	11–14
26	April 24	Marlins	4–9	Alcántara (3–2)	**Houser** (0–3)	―	**Oracle Park**	38,317	11–15
27	April 25	Marlins	6–2	**Gage** (2–0)	Pérez (2–2)	―	**Oracle Park**	38,589	12–15
28	April 26	Marlins	6–3	**Roupp** (5–1)	Nardi (1–1)	**Miller** (2)	**Oracle Park**	40,455	13–15
29	April 28	@ Phillies	0–7	Luzardo (2–3)	**Mahle** (2–3)	―	Citizens Bank Park	36,731	13–16
–	April 29	@ Phillies	Postponed (rain); Makeup: April 30 as a split double-header						
30	April 30 (1)	@ Phillies	2–3	Shugart (1–0)	**Walker** (0–1)	―	Citizens Bank Park	36,861	13–17
31	April 30 (2)	@ Phillies	5–6 (10)	Shugart (2–0)	**Gage** (2–1)	―	Citizens Bank Park	34,109	13–18

May: 10–18 (Home: 5–7; Away: 5–11)

#	Date	Opponent	Score	Win	Loss	Save	Stadium	Attendance	Record
32	May 1	@ Rays	0–3	McClanahan (3–2)	**Ray** (2–4)	Baker (8)	Tropicana Field	13,330	13–19
33	May 2	@ Rays	1–5	Scholtens (3–1)	**Roupp** (5–2)	―	Tropicana Field	21,973	13–20
34	May 3	@ Rays	1–2 (10)	Seymour (1–0)	**Kilian** (1–1)	―	Tropicana Field	20,108	13–21
35	May 4	Padres	3–2	**McDonald** (1–0)	Vásquez (3–1)	**Kilian** (1)	**Oracle Park**	33,097	14–21
36	May 5	Padres	5–10	Buehler (2–2)	**Webb** (2–4)	―	**Oracle Park**	38,275	14–22
37	May 6	Padres	1–5	Waldron (1–1)	**Houser** (0–4)	―	**Oracle Park**	34,181	14–23
38	May 8	Pirates	5–2	**Ray** (3–4)	Mlodzinski (2–3)	―	**Oracle Park**	41,024	15–23
39	May 9	Pirates	3–13	Ashcraft (2–2)	**Roupp** (5–3)	―	**Oracle Park**	40,417	15–24
40	May 10	Pirates	7–6 (10)	**Borucki** (1–1)	Lawrence (0–2)	―	**Oracle Park**	41,085	16–24
41	May 11	@ Dodgers	9–3	**Gage** (3–1)	Vesia (1–1)	―	Dodger Stadium	44,298	17–24
42	May 12	@ Dodgers	6–2	**Houser** (1–4)	Yamamoto (3–3)	**Kilian** (2)	Dodger Stadium	50,029	18–24
43	May 13	@ Dodgers	0–4	Ohtani (3–2)	**Ray** (3–5)	―	Dodger Stadium	48,043	18–25
44	May 14	@ Dodgers	2–5	Sheehan (3–1)	**Roupp** (5–4)	Scott (4)	Dodger Stadium	51,048	18–26
45	May 15	@ Athletics	2–5	Civale (5–1)	**Mahle** (1–5)	Harris (3)	Sutter Health Park	12,348	18–27
46	May 16	@ Athletics	6–4	**McDonald** (2–0)	Severino (2–5)	**Gage** (1)	Sutter Health Park	12,489	19–27
47	May 17	@ Athletics	10–1	**Houser** (2–4)	Springs (3–4)	―	Sutter Health Park	12,541	20–27
48	May 18	@ Diamondbacks	2–12	Gallen (2–4)	**Ray** (3–6)	―	Chase Field	20,072	20–28
49	May 19	@ Diamondbacks	3–5	Loáisiga (1–1)	**Kilian** (1–2)	―	Chase Field	19,548	20–29
50	May 20	@ Diamondbacks	3–6	Kelly (4–3)	**Mahle** (1–6)	Sewald (11)	Chase Field	17,748	20–30
51	May 22	White Sox	4–9	Martin (7–1)	**McDonald** (2–1)	―	**Oracle Park**	37,524	20–31
52	May 23	White Sox	10–3	**Gage** (4–1)	Fedde (0–5)	―	**Oracle Park**	40,172	21–31
53	May 24	White Sox	8–5	**Winn** (1–1)	Schultz (2–4)	**Kilian** (3)	**Oracle Park**	40,220	22–31
54	May 25	Diamondbacks	2–6	Kelly (5–3)	**Roupp** (5–5)	―	**Oracle Park**	38,380	22–32
55	May 26	Diamondbacks	5–7	Rodríguez (5–1)	**Mahle** (1–7)	Sewald (13)	**Oracle Park**	32,336	22–33
56	May 27	Diamondbacks	2–3	Soroka (7–2)	**McDonald** (2–2)	Sewald (14)	**Oracle Park**	33,258	22–34
57	May 29	@ Rockies	6–8	Mejía (1–4)	**Kilian** (1–3)	―	Coors Field	28,568	22–35
58	May 30	@ Rockies	3–8	Feltner (2–1)	**Houser** (2–5)	―	Coors Field	31,085	22–36
59	May 31	@ Rockies	19–6	**Kilian** (2–3)	Gordon (0–1)	―	Coors Field	37,965	23–36

June: 12–14 (Home: 6–6; Away: 6–8)

#	Date	Opponent	Score	Win	Loss	Save	Stadium	Attendance	Record
60	June 1	@ Brewers	2–16	Patrick (3–2)	**Roupp** (5–6)	―	American Family Field	28,154	23–37
61	June 2	@ Brewers	3–8	Harrison (7–1)	**McDonald** (2–3)	―	American Family Field	29,728	23–38
62	June 3	@ Brewers	1–0	**Webb** (3–4)	Gasser (0–2)	**Winn** (1)	American Family Field	31,924	24–38
63	June 4	@ Brewers	12–9	**Hentges** (1–0)	Crow (0–1)	**Kilian** (4)	American Family Field	32,570	25–38
64	June 5	@ Cubs	18–3	**Ray** (4–6)	Cabrera (3–3)	―	Wrigley Field	39,060	26–38
65	June 6	@ Cubs	2–3 (10)	Rolison (5–1)	**Hentges** (1–1)	―	Wrigley Field	39,248	26–39
66	June 7	@ Cubs	2–1 (10)	**Winn** (2–1)	Thonton (2–2)	**Smith** (1)	Wrigley Field	36,317	27–39
67	June 8	Nationals	3–4	Beeter (2–1)	**Winn** (2–2)	Varland (5)	**Oracle Park**	35,432	27–40
68	June 9	Nationals	3–6	Lord (4–0)	**Houser** (2–6)	―	**Oracle Park**	35,493	27–41
69	June 10	Nationals	11–10	**Sanmartín** (1–0)	Parker (2–3)	–	**Oracle Park**	32,459	28–41
70	June 12	Cubs	1–5	Assad (4–1)	**Roupp** (5–7)	―	**Oracle Park**	38,115	28–42
71	June 13	Cubs	1–6	Brown (3–2)	**McDonald** (2–4)	―	**Oracle Park**	35,142	28–43
72	June 14	Cubs	5–1	**Webb** (4–4)	Rea (5–5)	―	**Oracle Park**	40,093	29–43
73	June 16 (Note: The June 16 game was suspended due to rain in the bottom of the second inning with the Giants leading 3–2; it was completed before the regularly scheduled game on June 17.)	@ Braves	7–2	**Ray** (5–6)	Holmes (4–3)	―	Truist Park	31,266	30–43
74	June 17	@ Braves	7–5	**Whisenhunt** (1–0)	Ritchie (1–2)	**Beck** (1)	Truist Park	35,449	31–43
–	June 18	@ Braves	Postponed (rain); Makeup: August 31						
75	June 19	@ Marlins	3–4	Gibson (1–0)	**Hentges** (1–2)	Fairbanks (10)	LoanDepot Park	11,677	31–44
76	June 20	@ Marlins	3–6	Meyer (8–0)	**McDonald** (2–5)	Fairbanks (11)	LoanDepot Park	22,643	31–45
77	June 21	@ Marlins	1–2	King (4–1)	**Webb** (4–5)	Bachar (1)	LoanDepot Park	18,749	31–46
78	June 23	Athletics	3–1	**Ray** (6–6)	Civale (5–4)	**Kilian** (5)	**Oracle Park**	40,043	32–46
79	June 24	Athletics	2–1	**Miller** (1–0)	Alvarado (3–3)	―	**Oracle Park**	37,526	33–46
80	June 25	Athletics	6–9	Hartlieb (1–0)	**Kilian** (2–4)	Barnett (2)	**Oracle Park**	33,089	33–47
81	June 26	Braves	1–3	Lee (4–0)	**McDonald** (2–6)	Iglesias (16)	**Oracle Park**	39,051	33–48
82	June 27	Braves	5–0	**Webb** (5–5)	Elder (5–6)	―	**Oracle Park**	35,140	34–48
83	June 28	Braves	3–2	**Ray** (7–6)	Sale (8–6)	**Kilian** (6)	**Oracle Park**	33,138	35–48
84	June 29	@ Diamondbacks	4–5	Rodríguez (7–2)	**Mahle** (1–8)	Sewald (19)	Chase Field	18,838	35–49
85	June 30	@ Diamondbacks	2–8	Pfaadt (1–1)	**Roupp** (5–8)	―	Chase Field	20,420	35–50

July: 12–13 (Home: 8–5; Away: 4–8)

#	Date	Opponent	Score	Win	Loss	Save	Stadium	Attendance	Record
86	July 1	@ Diamondbacks	6–4	**McDonald** (3–6)	Gallen (3–8)	**Kilian** (7)	Chase Field	17,142	36–50
87	July 3	@ Rockies	3–15	Feltner (3–2)	**Webb** (5–6)	Hughes (1)	Coors Field	47,655	36–51
88	July 4	@ Rockies	6–4	**Ray** (8–6)	Sullivan (0–3)	**Kilian** (8)	Coors Field	48,635	37–51
89	July 5	@ Rockies	6–7	Vodnik (3–3)	**Smith** (0–1)	Romano (5)	Coors Field	25,548	37–52
90	July 6	Blue Jays	10–1	**Roupp** (6–8)	Gausman (4–8)	―	**Oracle Park**	32,740	38–52
91	July 7	Blue Jays	3–9	Corbin (3–4)	**McDonald** (3–7)	―	**Oracle Park**	32,140	38–53
92	July 8	Blue Jays	0–10	Cease (6–4)	**Webb** (5–7)	―	**Oracle Park**	34,023	38–54
93	July 9	Rockies	8–2	**Whisenhunt** (1–0)	Feltner (3–3)	―	**Oracle Park**	32,301	39–54
94	July 10	Rockies	3–4	Senzatela (9–1)	**Kilian** (2–5)	Mejía (4)	**Oracle Park**	34,144	39–55
95	July 11	Rockies	4–2	**Mahle** (2–8)	Freeland (2–8)	**Brubaker** (1)	**Oracle Park**	35,190	40–55
96	July 12	Rockies	3–1	**Miller** (2–0)	Senzatela (9–2)	―	**Oracle Park**	33,354	41–55
–	July 14	**96th All-Star Game in Philadelphia, PA**							
97	July 17	@ Mariners	7–0	**Roupp** (7–8)	Miller (4–4)	―	T-Mobile Park	42,595	42–55
98	July 18	@ Mariners	3–4 (10)	Ferrer (3–1)	**Smith** (0–2)	―	T-Mobile Park	43,485	42–56
99	July 19	@ Mariners	3–6	Gilbert (8–6)	**Houser** (2–7)	Muñoz (17)	T-Mobile Park	36,204	42–57
100	July 20	@ Royals	3–4	Lange (1–5)	**Kilian** (2–6)	–	Kauffman Stadium	16,411	42–58
101	July 21	@ Royals	2–3	Avila (5–3)	**Mahle** (2–9)	Lange (9)	Kauffman Stadium	25,175	42–59
102	July 22	@ Royals	4–5	Lugo (4–6)	**Hentges** (1–3)	Cruz (1)	Kauffman Stadium	14,606	42–60
103	July 24	Angels	7–6 (10)	**Kilian** (3–6)	Silseth (3–2)	—	**Oracle Park**	41,559	43–60
104	July 25	Angels	9–2	**Ray** (9–6)	Johnson (2–5)	―	**Oracle Park**	39,102	44–60
105	July 26	Angels	3–4	Soriano (9–6)	**Whisenhunt** (2–1)	Farris (1)	**Oracle Park**	34,111	44–61
106	July 27	Brewers	3–0	**Mahle** (3–9)	Sproat (3–6)	**Miller** (3)	**Oracle Park**	35,107	45–61
107	July 28	Brewers	2–8	Henderson (5–1)	**Roupp** (7–9)	―	**Oracle Park**	38,021	45–62
108	July 29	Brewers	16–3	**Webb** (6–7)	Pannone (0–1)	―	**Oracle Park**	35,399	46–62
109	July 30	@ Padres	4–1	**Ray** (10–6)	Sears (3–4)	**Miller** (4)	Petco Park	42,758	47–62
110	July 31	@ Padres	0–7	Matsui (2–1)	**Whisenhunt** (2–2)	Márquez (1)	Petco Park	44,057	47–63

August: 10–18 (Home: 7–9; Away: 3–9)

#	Date	Opponent	Score	Win	Loss	Save	Stadium	Attendance	Record
111	August 1	@ Padres	5–6	Miller (4–1)	**Smith** (0–3)	―	Petco Park	43,766	47–64
112	August 2	@ Padres	4–5	Canning (3–9)	**Roupp** (7–10)	Morejón (2)	Petco Park	43,856	47–65
113	August 3	@ Rangers	5–1	**Webb** (7–7)	Quantrill (4–4)	―	Globe Life Field	23,736	48–65
114	August 4	@ Rangers	4–5	Latz (3–1)	**Smith** (0–4)	―	Globe Life Field	26,959	48–66
115	August 5	@ Rangers	0–6	Alexander (2–2)	**Whisenhunt** (2–3)	―	Globe Life Field	26,098	48–67
116	August 7	Tigers	5–2	**Houser** (3–7)	Montero (8–7)	**Smith** (2)	**Oracle Park**	34,104	49–67
117	August 8	Tigers	0–8	Jobe (1–0)	**Roupp** (7–11)	–	**Oracle Park**	35,506	49–68
118	August 9	Tigers	1–3 (10)	Jansen (3–4)	**Hentges** (1–4)	Holton (2)	**Oracle Park**	32,200	49–69
119	August 10	Astros	3–6 (10)	Hader (4–1)	**Foley** (0–1)	–	**Oracle Park**	28,070	49–70
120	August 11	Astros	4–1	**Whisenhunt** (3–3)	Brown (3–2)	**Brubaker** (2)	**Oracle Park**	30,093	50–70
121	August 12	Astros	1–2	Okert (6–1)	**Winn** (2–3)	Hader (17)	**Oracle Park**	28,101	50–71
122	August 14	Rockies	2–5	Freeland (4–10)	**Roupp** (7–12)	―	**Oracle Park**	38,258	50–72
123	August 15	Rockies	7–1	**Webb** (8–7)	Lorenzen (3–11)	―	**Oracle Park**	35,069	51–72
124	August 16	Rockies	7–13	Frasso (1–1)	**Hentges** (1–5)	―	**Oracle Park**	32,063	51–73
125	August 18	@ Guardians	1–8	Griffin (14–4)	**Whisenhunt** (3–4)	–	Progressive Field	21,309	51–74
126	August 19	@ Guardians	1–0	**Houser** (4–7)	Messick (9–8)	**Smith** (3)	Progressive Field	20,021	52–74
127	August 20	@ Guardians	2–5	Williams (12–7)	**Roupp** (7–13)	Smith (32)	Progressive Field	24,448	52–75
128	August 21	@ Red Sox	4–6	Gray (16–3)	**Webb** (8–8)	Chapman (28)	Fenway Park	37,007	52–76
129	August 22	@ Red Sox	2–3	Olds (1–1)	**Hentges** (1–6)	–	Fenway Park	36,478	52–77
130	August 23	@ Red Sox	4–5	Bennett (8–6)	**Wilkinson** (0–1)	Chapman (29)	Fenway Park	36,278	52–78
131	August 24	Reds	5–0	**Foley** (1–1)	Burns (14–3)	–	**Oracle Park**	31,123	53–78
132	August 25	Reds	3–1	**Molina** (1–0)	Singer (5–12)	**Seymour** (1)	**Oracle Park**	27,207	54–78
133	August 26	Reds	9–10	Santillan (2–4)	**Smith** (0–5)	Pagán (17)	**Oracle Park**	24,130	54–79
134	August 27	Diamondbacks	6–1	**Roupp** (8–13)	Cabrera (0–3)	―	**Oracle Park**	40,120	55–79
135	August 28	Diamondbacks	6–10	Carrillo (3–1)	**Tidwell** (0–1)	―	**Oracle Park**	27,153	55–80
136	August 29 (1) (Note: The August 30 game was moved forward a day as a doubleheader to accommodate for the rescheduling of the previously postponned game against the Braves on June 18.)	Diamondbacks	1–7	Kelly (9–12)	**Wilkinson** (0–2)	–	**Oracle Park**	39,190	55–81
137	August 29 (2)	Diamondbacks	7–2	**Sanmartín** (2–0)	Bratt (1–3)	―	**Oracle Park**	29,272	56–81
138	August 31	@ Braves	7–3	**Molina** (2–0)	Elder (8–8)	―	Truist Park	29,349	57–81

September: 8–16 (Home: 4–8; Away: 4–8)

#	Date	Opponent	Score	Win	Loss	Save	Stadium	Attendance	Record
139	September 1	@ Pirates	12–13	Montgomery (6–3)	**Seymour** (0–1)	―	PNC Park	11,814	57–82
140	September 2	@ Pirates	5–4 (10)	**Foley** (2–1)	Doval (3–2)	**Smith** (4)	PNC Park	11,763	58–82
141	September 3	@ Pirates	2–5	Curtis (1–0)	**Tidwell** (0–2)	Montgomery (8)	PNC Park	11,578	58–83
142	September 4	@ Mets	6–10	McLean (11–8)	**Wilkinson** (0–3)	―	Citi Field	29,377	58–84
143	September 5	@ Mets	9–5	**Molina** (3–0)	Thornton (3–5)	–	Citi Field	30,046	59–84
144	September 6	@ Mets	2–4	Myers (1–2)	**Seymour** (0–2)	Senga (6)	Citi Field	29,410	59–85
145	September 7	Cardinals	5–4 (11)	**Foley** (3–1)	Soriano (6–4)	―	**Oracle Park**	25,833	60–85
146	September 8	Cardinals	2–1	**Roupp** (9–13)	Mathews (1–3)	**Kuhnel** (7)	**Oracle Park**	27,787	61–85
147	September 9	Cardinals	7–6	**Wilkinson** (1–3)	Soriano (6–5)	**Harris** (1)	**Oracle Park**	27,487	62–85
148	September 11	Padres	5–7	Ray (12–8)	**Molina** (3–1)	Miller (35)	**Oracle Park**	38,381	62–86
149	September 12	Padres	6–7	King (11–9)	**Perdomo** (0–1)	Miller (36)	**Oracle Park**	40,146	62–87
150	September 13	Padres	4–6	Peralta (3–2)	**Webb** (8–9)	Matsui (1)	**Oracle Park**	35,115	62–88
151	September 14	@ Cardinals	1–2	Mathews (2–3)	**Roupp** (9–14)	O'Brien (37)	Busch Stadium	25,150	62–89
152	September 15	@ Cardinals	10–3	**Tidwell** (1–2)	Pallante (12–7)	–	Busch Stadium	26,666	63–89
153	September 16	@ Cardinals	6–5 (10)	**Sanmartín** (3–0)	O'Brien (3–9)	**Kuhnel** (8)	Busch Stadium	24,960	64–89
154	September 18	@ Dodgers	2–8	Glasnow (5–1)	**Foley** (3–2)	―	Dodger Stadium	48,145	64–90
155	September 19	@ Dodgers	4–10	Skubal (11–7)	**Marte** (0–1)	–	Dodger Stadium	47,410	64–91
156	September 20	@ Dodgers	1–3	Bubic (4–2)	**Hentges** (1–7)	Scott (23)	Dodger Stadium	48,085	64–92
157	September 21	Twins	5–2	**Beck** (1–0)	Matthews (9–11)	**Harris** (2)	**Oracle Park**	27,466	65–92
158	September 22	Twins	2–3	Bradley (12–6)	**Molina** (3–2)	Hoffman (6)	**Oracle Park**	28,079	65–93
159	September 23	Twins	2–4	Gómez (3–4)	**Smith** (0–6)	Morris (5)	**Oracle Park**	28,136	65–94
160	September 25	Dodgers	0–2	Skubal (12–7)	**Marte** (0–2)	Scott (24)	**Oracle Park**	40,770	65–95
161	September 26	Dodgers	3–4	Phillips (3–2)	**Harris** (0–1)	Scott (25)	**Oracle Park**	40,124	65–96
162	September 27	Dodgers	1–5 (10)	Vesia (3–1)	**Davitt** (0–1)	―	**Oracle Park**	40,145	65–97

== Roster ==
2026 San Francisco Giants
Roster
Pitchers: 57 Philip Abner; 43 Tristan Beck; 76 Spencer Bivens; 47 Ryan Borucki; 34 JT Brubaker; 70 José Buttó; 76 Duncan Davitt; 57 Camilo Doval; 64 Jason Foley; 93 Matt Gage; 68 Trent Harris; 31 Sam Hentges; 12 Adrian Houser; 45 Caleb Kilian; 54 Joel Kuhnel; 86 Seth Lonsway; 54 Tyler Mahle; 87 Yunior Marte; 72 Trevor McDonald; 68 Erik Miller; 45 Anthony Molina; 63 Joel Peguero; 83 Cesar Perdomo; 71 Wilkin Ramos; 38 Robbie Ray; 65 Landen Roupp; 90 Braxton Roxby; 48 Reiver Sanmartín; 57 Gregory Santos; 77 Carson Seymour; 66 Dylan Smith; 46 Blade Tidwell; 74 Ryan Walker; 62 Logan Webb; 88 Carson Whisenhunt; 71 Matt Wilkinson; 67 Keaton Winn	Catchers: 14 Patrick Bailey; 61 Drew Cavanaugh; 18 Eric Haase; 19 Andrew Knizner; 13 Logan Porter; 79 Jesús Rodríguez; 6 Daniel Susac; Infielders: 2 Willy Adames; 1 Luis Arráez; 39 Osleivis Basabe; 26 Matt Chapman; 16 Rafael Devers; 8 Bryce Eldridge; 56 Nate Furman; 29 Brett Harris; 41 Buddy Kennedy; 50 Christian Koss; 7 Marcelo Mayer; 10 Casey Schmitt; 13 Shay Whitcomb	Outfielders: 9 Harrison Bader; 91 Scott Bandura; 78 Víctor Bericoto; 7 Will Brennan; 53 Jonah Cox; 94 Bo Davidson; 19 Jerar Encarnación; 0 Drew Gilbert; 52 Turner Hill; 51 Jung Hoo Lee; 49 Eddys Leonard; 58 Grant McCray; 56 Jared Oliva; 17 Heliot Ramos	Manager: 23 Tony Vitello; Coaches: 85 Frank Anderson (pitching director); 23 Ron Wotus (interim third base); 80 Héctor Borg (player development); 96 Oscar Bernard (assistant hitting); 97 Alex Burg (field coordinator/catching); 75 Jesse Chavez (bullpen); 84 Justin Meccage (pitching); 59 Hunter Mense (hitting); 81 Gary Pettis (third base); 82 Shane Robinson (first base); 33 Jayce Tingler (bench); 99 Taira Uematsu (quality control); 37 Ron Washington (infield); 92 Christian Wonders (assistant pitching); 98 Eliezer Zambrano (bullpen catcher)

=== Major league debuts ===
- April 1: Daniel Susac
- May 4: Jesús Rodríguez
- May 22: Víctor Bericoto
- May 31: Jonah Cox
- June 1: Wilkin Ramos
- June 26: Drew Cavanaugh
- August 1: Nate Furman
- August 4: Eddys Leonard
- August 8: Trent Harris
- August 15: Turner Hill
- August 19: Matt Wilkinson
- August 28: Braxton Roxby
- August 29: Seth Lonsway, Yunior Marte
- September 1: César Perdomo
- September 13: Scott Bandura
- September 21: Bo Davidson

== Statistics ==
=== Batting ===
Note: Team leaders in each category are noted in bold

Note: G = Games played; PA = Plate appearances; R = Runs; H = Hits; 2B = Doubles; 3B = Triples; HR = Home runs; RBI = Runs batted in; SB = Stolen bases; BB = Walks; K = Strikeouts; AVG = Batting average; OBP = On-base percentage; SLG = Slugging percentage; OPS = On base + slugging

Player	G	PA	R	H	2B	3B	HR	RBI	SB	BB	K	AVG	OBP	SLG	OPS
Willy Adames	121	505	62	107	25	1	21	51	5	37	139	.230	.289	.424	.713
Luis Arráez	105	464	52	136	23	**7**	4	43	10	25	21	.324	.360	.440	.801
Harrison Bader	30	111	10	18	5	0	5	43	14	0	4	.170	.198	.358	.557
Patrick Bailey	30	89	5	12	0	0	1	5	2	7	22	.146	.213	.183	.396
Scott Bandura	13	30	2	6	1	0	0	1	1	1	17	.207	.233	.241	.475
Osleivis Basabe	46	143	13	26	3	0	5	13	2	9	29	.202	.268	.341	.609
Victor Bericoto	41	116	9	27	5	0	5	15	1	4	32	.241	.267	.420	.687
Will Brennan	11	23	0	2	0	0	0	0	0	0	3	.087	.087	.087	.174
Drew Cavanaugh	59	166	9	33	4	1	1	12	1	18	50	.229	.315	.292	.606
Matt Chapman	84	307	35	72	18	1	7	42	0	37	81	.235	.324	.368	.692
Jonah Cox	62	169	26	38	4	2	4	16	**16**	10	65	.252	.298	.384	.682
Bo Davidson	6	22	2	7	0	0	0	1	1	1	7	.350	.364	.350	.682
Rafael Devers	**148**	**633**	**88**	144	**36**	1	**37**	**98**	0	**69**	**161**	.258	**.340**	**.525**	**.865**
Bryce Eldridge	107	448	50	104	23	0	17	57	1	59	119	.269	.364	.461	.825
Jerar Encarnación	17	35	1	6	1	0	0	0	0	1	8	.176	.200	.206	.406
Nate Furman	22	39	2	4	1	0	0	3	0	5	10	.125	.243	.125	.368
Drew Gilbert	134	393	53	81	14	3	11	43	3	39	71	.238	.330	.394	.724
Eric Haase	29	84	8	12	3	0	4	9	0	6	28	.162	.235	.365	.599
Brett Harris	15	42	3	6	2	0	0	2	0	2	14	.158	.220	.211	.430
Turner Hill	34	105	13	23	7	0	1	16	2	13	21	.219	.306	.314	.621
Buddy Kennedy	20	38	2	4	0	0	0	1	0	4	11	.121	.237	.121	.358
Andrew Knizner	29	80	8	16	4	0	2	4	0	4	14	.219	.288	.356	.644
Christian Koss	70	221	27	44	6	0	4	12	5	9	59	.217	.257	.305	.562
Jung Hoo Lee	143	579	65	**149**	31	4	10	57	12	29	57	**.276**	.320	.404	.724
Eddys Leonard	3	8	0	2	1	0	0	0	0	0	2	.250	.250	.375	.625
Marcelo Mayer	6	17	0	1	0	0	0	0	0	2	7	.067	.167	.067	.234
Grant McCray	43	91	14	11	2	1	2	4	8	11	28	.143	.250	.273	.523
Jared Oliva	7	7	1	1	0	0	0	0	1	0	1	.143	.143	.143	.286
Logan Porter	1	0	0	1	0	0	0	0	0	0	0	—	—	—	
Heliot Ramos	74	306	36	76	13	3	9	34	3	16	82	.264	.304	.424	.728
Jesús Rodríguez	22	58	7	12	3	0	2	8	1	5	8	.235	.316	.412	.728
Casey Schmitt	98	409	47	107	17	1	21	55	9	11	81	.271	.301	.483	.784
Daniel Susac	53	161	11	35	8	1	3	22	2	8	36	.243	.289	.375	.664
Shay Whitcomb	32	98	7	21	3	0	2	8	2	3	24	.226	.250	.323	.573
**Team totals**	**162**	**6061**	**669**	**1341**	**262**	**26**	**178**	**646**	**88**	**449**	**1342**	**.245**	**.306**	**.400**	**.706**

=== Pitching ===
Note: List does not include position players. Team leaders in each category are noted in bold
Note: W = Wins; L = Losses; ERA = Earned run average G = Games pitched; GS = Games started; SV = Saves; IP = Innings pitched; H = Hits allowed; R = Runs allowed; ER = Earned runs allowed; BB = Walks allowed; K = Strikeouts

Player	W	L	ERA	G	GS	SV	IP	H	R	ER	BB	K
Philip Abner	0	0	9.64	5	0	0	4.2	7	7	5	3	4
Tristan Beck	1	0	5.21	14	0	1	19.0	21	11	11	5	9
Spencer Bivens	0	0	14.40	4	0	0	8.0	11	10	8	4	8
Ryan Borucki	1	1	4.94	21	0	0	23.2	27	14	13	9	15
JT Brubaker	0	0	3.58	41	1	2	60.1	49	27	24	26	39
José Buttó	0	0	22.50	3	0	0	2.0	6	5	5	4	5
Duncan Davitt	0	1	9.00	4	0	0	6.0	8	7	6	3	4
Camilo Doval	0	0	0.00	2	0	0	2.0	0	0	0	1	4
Jason Foley	3	2	4.15	24	0	0	26.0	28	15	12	11	15
Matt Gage	4	1	5.60	34	0	1	27.1	28	18	17	17	22
Trent Harris	0	1	2.31	22	0	2	23.1	20	7	6	7	27
Sam Hentges	1	7	3.19	**45**	0	0	36.2	35	17	13	25	41
Adrian Houser	4	7	4.02	26	16	0	109.2	109	54	49	34	75
Caleb Kilian	3	6	4.26	**45**	0	**8**	44.1	39	23	21	20	53
Joel Kuhnel	0	0	2.79	10	0	2	9.2	9	6	3	6	6
Seth Lonsway	0	0	7.71	2	0	0	2.1	7	3	2	2	14
Tyler Mahle	3	9	5.13	18	18	0	94.2	95	55	54	37	89
Yunior Marte	0	2	4.44	5	3	0	24.1	24	12	12	10	15
Trevor McDonald	3	7	5.12	14	14	0	70.1	69	43	40	23	57
Erik Miller	2	0	2.76	38	0	4	32.2	23	10	10	22	45
Anthony Molina	3	2	3.72	6	5	0	29.0	23	14	12	6	29
Joel Peguero	0	0	2.38	11	0	0	11.1	10	5	3	4	5
César Perdomo	0	1	3.65	5	4	0	24.2	27	10	10	7	14
Wilkin Ramos	0	0	22.50	2	0	0	2.0	5	5	5	4	1
Robbie Ray	**10**	6	3.08	23	21	0	122.2	101	50	42	57	107
Landen Roupp	9	**14**	4.01	29	**29**	0	155.0	126	74	69	**75**	**143**
Braxton Roxby	0	0	3.38	4	0	0	5.1	6	2	2	2	3
Reiver Sanmartín	3	0	4.22	24	0	0	21.1	22	12	10	7	16
Gregory Santos	0	0	3.60	3	0	0	5.1	5	5	2	3	1
Carson Seymour	0	2	4.55	25	1	1	31.2	31	19	16	16	23
Dylan Smith	0	6	3.86	42	0	4	39.2	35	20	17	22	45
Blade Tidwell	4	5	4.45	17	9	1	56.2	46	29	28	21	46
Ryan Walker	0	1	7.16	33	0	3	32.2	40	27	26	19	23
Logan Webb	8	9	4.31	27	27	0	**160.2**	**147**	**80**	**77**	41	134
Carson Whisenhunt	3	4	6.49	8	8	0	34.2	41	26	25	21	26
Matt Wilkinson	1	3	3.58	8	6	0	27.2	22	14	11	5	20
Keaton Winn	2	3	3.35	44	0	5	34.0	34	17	16	17	33
**Team totals**	**65**	**79**	**4.33**	**162**	**162**	**30**	**1430.0**	**1345**	**760**	**688**	**596**	**1204**

Note: No ERA leader/qualifier noted as no pitcher reached 162 innings (1 inning pitched per played game).

== Farm system ==
Level	Team	League	Manager	First half Win–loss record	First half position	Second half Win–loss record	Second half position	Postseason
AAA	Sacramento River Cats	Pacific Coast League (West Division)	Dave Brundage	42–30	2nd place 1.5 GB	37–38	6th place 11.0 GB	Did not qualify
AA	Richmond Flying Squirrels	Eastern League (Southwest Division)	Dennis Pelfrey	43–25	1st place	31–36	5th place 11.0 GB	Lost Division Series 0–2 vs. Erie Seawolves
High-A	Eugene Emeralds	Northwest League	Jacob Heyward	42–24	1st place	37–28	1st place	Lost NWL Championship 0–3 vs. Vancouver Canadiens
Low-A	San Jose Giants	California League (North Division)	Ydwin Villegas	37–29	1st place	43–23	1st place	Won Division Series 2–0 vs. Stockton Ports Lost Championship 1–2 vs. Lake Elsinore Storm
Rookie	ACL Giants	Arizona Complex League (East Division)	Jeremiah Knackstedt	34–26	2nd place 6.5 GB	–	–	Did not qualify
Foreign Rookie	DSL Giants Black	Dominican Summer League (San Pedro Division)	Juan Ciriaco	36–20	Tied-1st place	–	–	1st Pool A Lost Semifinal 0–2 vs. DSL Padres Gold
Foreign Rookie	DSL Giants Orange	Dominican Summer League (Northeast Division)	Ian Macdonald	31–24	2nd place 1.5 GB	–	–	Did not qualify

=== Awards and honors ===
On September 28, the Giants' farm system was named Farm System of the Year by MLB Prospect Pipeline.

All-Star Futures Game participants

- Gavin Kilen, SS/2B, Eugene Emeralds (A+)
- Dakota Jordan, OF, Eugene Emeralds (A+)

Pacific Coast League (AAA) All-Stars

- Carson Seymour, RHP (Pitcher of the Year)
- Carson Whisenhunt, LHP

Eastern League (AA) All-Stars

- Bo Davidson, OF

Northwest League (A+) All-Stars

- Jacob Bresnahan, LHP (Pitcher of the Year)
- Dakota Jordan, OF
- Jhonny Level, UTL (Top MLB Prospect)
- Ryan Vanderhei, RHP
- Jacob Heyward, Manager (Manager of the Year)

Arizona Complex League (Rookie) Top MLB Prospect

- Josuar González, SS

Dominican Summer League (Foreign Rookie) All-Stars

- Franco Willis, DH

== Major League Baseball draft ==
The 2026 MLB Draft was held July 11–12, 2026 in Philadelphia, Pennsylvania, home of the 2026 MLB All-Star Game. The Giants made 21 selections in the draft, acquiring an additional pick from the Cleveland Guardians in exchange for Patrick Bailey.

2026 draft picks

Round	Pick	Name	Position†	School	Year	Signed	Bonus
1	4	Jackson Flora	RHP	UC Santa Barbara	College Junior	Yes	$7,997,500
CB–A	29	Carson Bolemon	LHP	Southside Christian School	High School Senior	Yes	$3,382,500
2	55	Kaden Waechter	RHP	Jesuit (FL) High School	High School Senior	Yes	$3,247,500
3	90	Peyton Bonds	OF	Rutgers	College Junior	Yes	$887,000
4	118	Carlos Martinez	RHP	Hofstra	College Senior	Yes	$600,000
5	150	Luke Nixon	2B	NC State	College Junior	Yes	$479,300
6	179	Eric Nachtsheim	RHP	McNeese	College Senior	Yes	$277,950
7	208	Beau Bryans	LHP	Jacksonville State	College Senior	Yes	$219,225
8	238	Cody Brasch	RHP	Louisiana	College Junior	Yes	$232,200
9	268	Mike Mancini	2B	Vanderbilt	College Senior	Yes	$22,500
10	298	Ian Korn	RHP	West Virginia	College Graduate Student	Yes	$47,500
11	328	Charlie Bussey III	OF	Francis Marion	College Senior	Yes	$150,000
12	358	Josiah Kemp	OF	Choctaw High School	High School Senior	Yes	$397,500
13	388	Colin Fisher	LHP	Arkansas	College Junior	Yes	$297,500
14	418	Alex Solis	RHP	Houston	College Junior	Yes	$150,000
15	448	Drew Smith	3B	Oregon	College Senior	Yes	$25,000
16	478	Dalton Wentz	3B	Wake Forest	College Sophomore	Yes	$584,955
17	508	Tanner Mally	OF	Western Michigan	College Junior	Yes	$150,000
18	538	Ryder Brooks	LHP	UC Irvine	College Junior	Yes	$120,000
19	568	Mikey Bell	3B	Gonzaga	College Senior	No	
20	598	JP Robertson	RHP	Ole Miss	College Junior	No	

† Positions are per MLB Draft Tracker.
