= Trent Harris =

Trent Harris may refer to:

- Trent Harris (director) (born 1952), American filmmaker
- Trent Harris (American football) (born 1995), American football player
- Trent Harris (baseball) (born 1999), American baseball player

== See also ==
- Tre Harris (born 2002), American football player
- Treon Harris (fl. 2012–2018), American college football player
