= Zach Morgan =

American baseball player (born 2000)

Baltimore Orioles
- Catcher
- Born: March 30, 2000 (age 26); Stockton, California, U.S.
- Bats: Right Throws: Right

Zachary Morgan (born March 30, 2000) is an American professional baseball catcher in the Baltimore Orioles organization. He is currently a phantom ballplayer, having spent a total of eight days on the San Francisco Giants' active roster without making an appearance.

== Amateur career ==
Morgan attended Lincoln High School in Stockton, California, and played college baseball at California State University, Fresno. As a redshirt junior with Fresno State, he hit for a .381 batting average with eight home runs and 41 runs batted in (RBI), being named a finalist for the Buster Posey Award.

== Professional career ==
=== San Francisco Giants ===
The San Francisco Giants selected Morgan in the seventh round, 226th overall, of the 2022 Major League Baseball draft. He made his professional debut that year with the Arizona Complex League Giants and San Jose Giants. Morgan split the 2023 campaign between San Jose and the High-A Eugene Emeralds, batting .265 with six home runs and 44 RBI. That offseason, he played in the Arizona Fall League with the Scottsdale Scorpions. Morgan spent the 2024 season between the Eugene and the Double-A Richmond Flying Squirrels, batting .212 with five home runs and 30 RBI. He returned to Richmond to begin the 2025 season before earning a promotion to the Triple-A Sacramento River Cats. Across the two levels, he batted .221 with three home runs and 16 RBI.

Morgan began the 2026 season with Double-A Richmond before being promoted to Triple-A Sacramento, slashing .269/.369/.370 in 38 games between the two teams. On August 10, 2026, the Giants selected his contract, added him to the 40-man roster, and promoted him to the major leagues for the first time. The move was made after Daniel Susac fractured his kneecap, leaving Drew Cavanaugh as the lone healthy catcher on San Francisco's roster. Morgan was optioned back to Sacramento the following day without appearing for the Giants, becoming a phantom ballplayer. He was re-promoted to San Francisco on September 1, and then re-demoted to Sacramento on September 8, once again without appearing in a major league game.

=== Baltimore Orioles ===
On November 2, 2026, Morgan was claimed off of waivers by the Baltimore Orioles. On November 17, he was sent outright to Triple-A Norfolk Tides.
