= Hunter Mense =

American baseball coach (born 1984)

Kansas City Royals
- Hitting coach
- Born: August 30, 1984 (age 42); Liberty, Missouri, U.S.
- Bats: Left Throws: Left

Teams
- Toronto Blue Jays (2022–2025); San Francisco Giants (2026)

Hunter Mense (born August 30, 1984) is an American professional baseball coach who currently serves as a hitting coach for the Kansas City Royals of Major League Baseball (MLB). He was promoted to the Toronto Blue Jays' major league coaching staff ahead of the 2022 season, in the role of assistant hitting coach and was the hitting coach for the San Francisco Giants for the 2026 season.

== Playing career ==
Mense attended the University of Missouri and played baseball for the Tigers, eventually being drafted in the 17th round of the 2006 MLB draft by the Florida Marlins. He spent parts of five seasons in the Marlins minor league system, briefly reaching Triple-A in 2010. Mense produced a .254 average and 19 home runs over 349 career MiLB games.

== Coaching career ==
=== Toronto Blue Jays ===
Mense served as the hitting coach for the Double-A New Hampshire Fisher Cats in 2018, who subsequently won the league championship. Mense then spent three seasons as the Minor League hitting coordinator for the Blue Jays. Ahead of the 2022 season, the Blue Jays promoted Mense to the major league staff as an assistant hitting coach, while still retaining his minor league coordinating title.

=== San Francisco Giants ===
On November 12, 2025, the San Francisco Giants hired Mense to serve as the team's hitting coach under new manager Tony Vitello.

=== Kansas City Royals ===
After a season with the Giants, on November 5, 2026, Mense left to join the Kansas City Royals as a hitting coach, alongside Marcus Thames and under offensive coordinator Connor Dawson.
