= Yunior Marte (baseball, born 2003) =

Dominican baseball player (born 2003)

San Francisco Giants – No. 87
- Pitcher
- Born: August 9, 2003 (age 23); Azua, Dominican Republic
- Bats: Right Throws: Right

MLB debut
- August 29, 2026, for the San Francisco Giants

MLB statistics (through 2026 season)
- Win–loss record: 0–2
- Earned run average: 4.44
- Strikeouts: 15
- Stats at Baseball Reference

Teams
- San Francisco Giants (2026–present)

Yunior Marte (born August 9, 2003) is a Dominican professional baseball pitcher for the San Francisco Giants of Major League Baseball (MLB). He made his MLB debut in 2026.

== Career ==
=== Kansas City Royals ===
Marte signed with the Kansas City Royals as an international free agent on June 2, 2022. He made his professional debut that year with the Dominican Summer League Royals. In 2023, Marte played for the Arizona Complex League Royals, posting a 4.14 earned run average (ERA) with 39 strikeouts across 12 appearances. He split the 2024 campaign between the ACL Royals and the Single-A Columbia Fireflies, recording an 8.76 ERA with 22 strikeouts. Marte began the 2025 season with Single-A Columbia, where he recorded a 3–5 record with a 2.74 ERA and 79 strikeouts in 19 starts.

=== San Francisco Giants ===
On July 31, 2025, the Royals traded Marte to the San Francisco Giants in exchange for Mike Yastrzemski. He spent the remainder of the year with the Single-A San Jose Giants, for whom he logged a 3.60 ERA with 17 strikeouts across five games.

Marte began the 2026 season with the High-A Eugene Emeralds before being promoted to the Double-A Richmond Flying Squirrels. Between the two affiliates, he posted a 3.85 ERA with 113 strikeouts in 22 appearances. On August 29, 2026, the Giants selected Marte's contract and promoted him to the major leagues for the first time. He made his major league debut later that day, starting the second game of the Giants' doubleheader and allowing one run while striking out three over 4 2/3 innings.
