= Wilkin Ramos =

Dominican baseball player (born 2000)

Athletics
- Pitcher
- Born: October 31, 2000 (age 26); Santo Domingo, Dominican Republic
- Bats: Right Throws: Right

MLB debut
- June 1, 2026, for the San Francisco Giants

MLB statistics (through 2026 season)
- Win–loss record: 0–0
- Earned run average: 22.50
- Strikeouts: 1
- Stats at Baseball Reference

Teams
- San Francisco Giants (2026)

Wilkin Ramos (born October 31, 2000) is a Dominican professional baseball pitcher in the Athletics organization. He made his Major League Baseball (MLB) debut in 2026.

== Career ==
=== Oakland Athletics ===
On July 25, 2017, Ramos signed with the Oakland Athletics as an international free agent. He made his professional debut in 2018 with the Dominican Summer League Athletics, compiling a 3–3 record and 3.15 ERA with 38 strikeouts in 40 innings pitched across 14 games (eight starts).

=== Pittsburgh Pirates ===
On December 1, 2018, Ramos was traded to the Pittsburgh Pirates as a player to be named later, completing a previous trade that saw Oakland acquire Tanner Anderson. In 2019, he made four starts for the rookie-level Gulf Coast League Pirates, struggling to an 0–2 record and 6.39 ERA with eight strikeouts across 12 2/3 innings pitched. Ramos did not play in a game in 2020 due to the cancellation of the minor league season because of the COVID-19 pandemic.

Ramos returned to action in 2021 with the rookie-level Florida Complex League Pirates, where he compiled a 2–1 record and 3.69 ERA with 36 strikeouts in 39 innings pitched across 12 games (including five starts). He spent the 2022 season with the Single-A Bradenton Marauders, registering a 4–1 record and 3.88 ERA with 58 strikeouts and three saves over 37 appearances.

=== New York Mets ===
On December 7, 2022, Ramos was selected by the New York Mets in the minor league phase of the Rule 5 draft. He split the 2023 season between the High-A Brooklyn Cyclones and Double-A Binghamton Rumble Ponies. In 33 appearances out of the bullpen for the two affiliates, Ramos accumulated a 5–2 record and 2.50 ERA with 67 strikeouts and three saves across 57 2/3 innings pitched.

In 2024, Ramos made 41 relief appearances split between Binghamton and the Triple-A Syracuse Mets, posting a cumulative 6–3 record and 3.00 ERA with 47 strikeouts and 11 saves over 51 innings of work. He elected free agency following the season on November 4, 2024.

=== Pittsburgh Pirates (second stint) ===
On November 23, 2024, Ramos signed a minor league contract to return to the Pittsburgh Pirates organization. He made 47 appearances split between the Double-A Altoona Curve and Triple-A Indianapolis Indians, accumulating a 4–4 record and 2.64 ERA with 68 strikeouts and seven saves across 64 2/3 innings pitched. Ramos elected free agency following the season on November 6, 2025.

=== San Francisco Giants ===
On November 19, 2025, Ramos signed a minor league contract with the San Francisco Giants. He was assigned to the Triple-A Sacramento River Cats to begin the regular season, where he posted a 3–1 record and 2.00 ERA with 27 strikeouts across his first 17 games. On June 1, 2026, Ramos was selected to the 40-man roster and promoted to the major leagues for the first time. He made two appearances for San Francisco, allowing five runs on five hits with one strikeout across two innings pitched. Ramos was designated for assignment by the Giants on June 26. He cleared waivers and was sent outright to Sacramento on July 2. He elected free agency on November 2.

=== Athletics (second stint) ===
On November 17, 2026, Ramos signed a minor league contract with the Athletics.
