= Seth Lonsway =

American baseball player (born 1998)

San Francisco Giants
- Pitcher
- Born: October 7, 1998 (age 28); St. Marys, Ohio, U.S.
- Bats: Left Throws: Left

MLB debut
- August 29, 2026, for the San Francisco Giants

MLB statistics (through 2026 season)
- Win–loss record: 0–0
- Earned run average: 7.71
- Strikeouts: 2
- Stats at Baseball Reference

Teams
- San Francisco Giants (2026)

Seth Joseph Lonsway (born October 7, 1998) is an American professional baseball pitcher in the San Francisco Giants organization. He made his Major League Baseball (MLB) debut in 2026.

== Amateur career ==
Lonsway attended Celina High School in Celina, Ohio, and played college baseball at Ohio State University. Following his high school graduation, he was selected by the Cincinnati Reds in the 19th round of the 2017 MLB draft but declined to sign. In 2019, he played collegiate summer baseball with the Brewster Whitecaps of the Cape Cod Baseball League. As a redshirt junior at Ohio State, Lonsway posted a 4.37 earned run average (ERA) with 98 strikeouts in 12 starts.

== Professional career ==
The San Francisco Giants selected Lonsway in the sixth round, with the 176th overall selection, of the 2021 Major League Baseball draft. He made his professional debut that year with the Arizona Complex League Giants. Lonsway spent the 2022 season with the Single-A San Jose Giants recording a 4.06 ERA with 120 strikeouts in 26 appearances. In 2023, he made 28 appearances for the High-A Eugene Emeralds, pitching to a 5.87 ERA with 78 strikeouts. Following the season, Lonsway played for the Scottsdale Scorpions of the Arizona Fall League. He returned to Eugene to begin the 2024 season before earning a promotion to the Double-A Richmond Flying Squirrels. Across the two levels, he recorded a 3.01 ERA with 83 strikeouts. Lonsway spent the 2025 season with Richmond and the Triple-A Sacramento River Cats, pitching to a 3.76 ERA with 122 strikeouts.

Lonsway began the 2026 season with Triple-A Sacramento and also pitched for Double-A Richmond, posting a 5.95 ERA between the two affiliates. On August 29, 2026, the Giants selected his contract and promoted him to the major leagues for the first time. He made his debut that day against the Arizona Diamondbacks, pitching two innings as part of the 7–1 loss. Following the game, Lonsway was optioned back to Triple-A. On November 2, Lonsway was removed from the 40–man roster and sent outright to Triple–A Sacramento.
