= Braxton Roxby =

American baseball player (born 1999)

Chicago Cubs
- Pitcher
- Born: March 12, 1999 (age 27); Windber, Pennsylvania, U.S.
- Bats: Right Throws: Right

MLB debut
- August 28, 2026, for the San Francisco Giants

MLB statistics (through 2026 season)
- Win–loss record: 0–0
- Earned run average: 3.38
- Strikeouts: 3
- Stats at Baseball Reference

Teams
- San Francisco Giants (2026)

Braxton Craig Roxby (born March 12, 1999) is an American professional baseball pitcher for the Chicago Cubs of Major League Baseball (MLB). He has previously played in MLB for the San Francisco Giants.

== Amateur career ==
Roxby played Division II college baseball for the University of Pittsburgh at Johnstown from 2018 to 2020 before going unselected in the 2020 Major League Baseball draft. In 2019, he played collegiate summer baseball with the Bourne Braves of the Cape Cod Baseball League.

== Professional career ==
=== Cincinnati Reds ===
On June 23, 2020, Roxby signed a minor league contract with the Cincinnati Reds as an undrafted free agent. He did not appear for the organization during the regular season as a result of the cancellation of the minor league season because of the COVID-19 pandemic. Roxby made his professional debut in 2021, splitting time between the High–A Dayton Dragons and Double–A Chattanooga Lookouts. In 31 appearances out of the bullpen for the two affiliates, he posted a cumulative 2–2 record and 4.31 ERA with 61 strikeouts and five saves across 39 2/3 innings pitched.

Roxby returned to Dayton for the 2022 season, pitching to a 3–0 record and 4.84 ERA with 32 strikeouts and three saves across 19 appearances out of the bullpen. He made 41 relief outings split between Dayton and Chattanooga during the 2023 campaign, compiling a 4–4 record and 3.34 ERA with 75 strikeouts and four saves across 59 1/3 innings pitched. Roxby made 39 appearances for Double–A Chattanooga during the 2024 campaign, registering an 0–4 record and 5.21 ERA with 65 strikeouts and three saves across 48 1/3 innings pitched.

=== San Francisco Giants ===
On January 29, 2025, Roxby was traded to the San Francisco Giants in exchange for Taylor Rogers. He went on to make 45 relief appearances split between the Double–A Richmond Flying Squirrels and Triple–A Sacramento River Cats, accumulating a 5–5 record and 3.63 ERA with 82 strikeouts and three saves over 62 innings of work.

Roxby returned to Triple–A Sacramento to begin the 2026 season, logging a 4–3 record and 4.11 ERA with 53 strikeouts across his first 36 appearances. On August 26, 2026, Roxby was selected to the 40–man roster and promoted to the major leagues for the first time. In doing so, Roxby became the first former Pitt–Johnstown player to reach the major leagues. He made his debut on August 28, tossing a scoreless inning and recording his first career strikeout. Roxby made four total appearances for San Francisco during his rookie campaign, recording a 3.38 ERA with three strikeouts across 5 1/3 innings pitched.

=== Washington Nationals ===
On October 29, 2026, Roxby was claimed off of waivers by the Washington Nationals. The Nationals designated him for assignment on November 17, 2026.

=== Chicago Cubs ===
On November 20, 2026, Roxby was traded to the Chicago Cubs in exchange for cash considerations.
