= César Perdomo =

Venezuelan baseball player (born 2002)

San Francisco Giants – No. 83
- Pitcher
- Born: February 9, 2002 (age 24); San Juan de los Morros, Guárico, Venezuela
- Bats: Left Throws: Left

MLB debut
- September 1, 2026, for the San Francisco Giants

MLB statistics (through 2026 season)
- Win–loss record: 0–1
- Earned run average: 3.65
- Strikeouts: 14
- Stats at Baseball Reference

Teams
- San Francisco Giants (2026–present)

César José Perdomo (born February 9, 2002) is a Venezuelan professional baseball pitcher for the San Francisco Giants of Major League Baseball (MLB).

== Career ==
On July 2, 2021, Perdomo signed with the San Francisco Giants as an international free agent. He made his professional debut in 2022 with the Dominican Summer League Giants, recording an 0.60 ERA with 18 strikeouts across four games (including three starts). Perdomo made 15 appearances (five starts) for the rookie–level Arizona Complex League Giants in 2023, compiling a 5–4 record and 5.55 ERA with 53 strikeouts over 60 innings of work.

Perdomo split the 2024 season between the Single–A San Jose Giants and High–A Eugene Emeralds. In 26 appearances (including 14 starts), he logged a combined 8–7 record and 2.78 ERA with 105 strikeouts and two saves over 97 innings of work. Perdomo started 26 games for Eugene during the 2025 campaign, registering an 8–6 record and 3.96 ERA with 118 strikeouts across 127 1/3 innings.

Perdomo began the 2026 season with the Double–A Richmond Flying Squirrels before being promoted to the Triple–A Sacramento River Cats; in 24 appearances (including 22 starts) for the two affiliates, he posted a cumulative 9–6 record and 4.43 ERA with 125 strikeouts across 120 innings pitched. On September 1, 2026, Perdomo was selected to the 40–man roster and promoted to the major leagues for the first time. He made his debut later that night, tossing four innings of one-run ball in relief of Logan Webb.
