= Eddys Leonard =

Dominican baseball player (born 2000)

Free agent
- Infielder
- Born: November 10, 2000 (age 25); Santo Domingo, Dominican Republic
- Bats: Right Throws: Right

MLB debut
- August 4, 2026, for the San Francisco Giants

MLB statistics (through 2026 season)
- Batting average: .250
- Home runs: 0
- Runs batted in: 0
- Stats at Baseball Reference

Teams
- San Francisco Giants (2026)

Eddys Leopoldo Leonard (born November 10, 2000) is a Dominican professional baseball infielder who is a free agent. He made his Major League Baseball (MLB) debut in 2026.

== Career ==
=== Los Angeles Dodgers ===
Leonard signed with the Los Angeles Dodgers as an international free agent in July 2017. He made his debut in the Dominican Summer League in 2018, hitting .248 in 45 games. In 2019 he played in 55 games, with the majority of them being for the rookie–level Arizona League Dodgers and hit .285. Leonard did not play in a game in 2020 due to the cancellation of the minor league season because of the COVID-19 pandemic. He split the 2021 season between the Great Lakes Loons and the Rancho Cucamonga Quakes, hitting .296 with 22 home runs and 81 RBI in 107 games.

On November 19, 2021, Leonard was added to the Dodgers 40-man roster to be protected from the Rule 5 draft. In the 2022 season, he played in 127 games for Great Lakes, hitting .264 with 15 homers and 61 RBI. Leonard was optioned to the Double-A Tulsa Drillers to begin the 2023 season. In 92 games for Tulsa, he batted .254 with 11 home runs and 44 RBI. On July 28, 2023, Leonard was designated for assignment.

=== Detroit Tigers ===
On August 1, 2023, Leonard was traded to the Detroit Tigers for cash considerations. In 40 games for the Triple–A Toledo Mud Hens, he batted .302/.374/.530 with 8 home runs and 31 RBI. Leonard was optioned to Triple–A Toledo to begin the 2024 season. In 82 games for the Single–A Lakeland Flying Tigers, High–A West Michigan Whitecaps, and Toledo, he slashed .253/.320/.435 with 11 home runs, 30 RBI, and nine stolen bases. On November 19, 2024, Leonard was designated for assignment by Detroit. Three days later, the Tigers non–tendered Leonard, making him a free agent.

On December 5, 2024, Leonard re–signed with the Tigers on a minor league contract. He was released by the Tigers prior to the start of the season on March 27, 2025.

=== Atlanta Braves ===
On March 29, 2025, Leonard signed a minor league contract with the Atlanta Braves. He made 126 appearances for the Triple-A Gwinnett Stripers, slashing .239/.304/.435 with 20 home runs, 61 RBI, and 11 stolen bases. Leonard elected free agency following the season on November 6.

=== Milwaukee Brewers ===
On November 15, 2025, Leonard signed a minor league contract with the Milwaukee Brewers. He made 69 appearances for the Triple–A Nashville Sounds, hitting .287/.371/.502 with 12 home runs, 46 RBI, and eight stolen bases. Leonard was released by the Brewers on July 16, 2026.

=== San Francisco Giants ===
On July 24, 2026, Leonard signed a minor league contract with the San Francisco Giants. He made eight appearances for the Triple–A Sacramento River Cats, going 4–for–28 (.143) with four home runs and five RBI. On August 4, the Giants selected Leonard's contract, adding him to their active roster. The next day, he recorded his first major league hit against Cody Bradford of the Texas Rangers. In three games for the Giants, Leonard went 2–for–8 (.250) with no RBI. On August 11, Leonard was designated for assignment by San Francisco. He cleared waivers and was sent outright to Sacramento on August 15. He elected free agency on November 2.
