= Víctor Bericoto =

Venezuelan baseball player (born 2001)

Free agent
- Outfielder
- Born: December 3, 2001 (age 24); Maracay, Venezuela
- Bats: Right Throws: Right

MLB debut
- May 22, 2026, for the San Francisco Giants

MLB statistics (through 2026 season)
- Batting average: .241
- Home runs: 5
- Runs batted in: 15
- Stats at Baseball Reference

Teams
- San Francisco Giants (2026)

Víctor Miguel Bericoto (born December 3, 2001) is a Venezuelan professional baseball outfielder who is a free agent. He made his Major League Baseball (MLB) debut in 2026 for the San Francisco Giants.

== Career ==
Bericoto signed with the San Francisco Giants as an international free agent in 2018 for a $25,000 signing bonus. He began his baseball career as a catcher, before transitioning into an outfielder.

The Giants promoted Bericoto to the major leagues on May 22, 2026. On June 3, Bericoto hit his first career home run off of Robert Gasser of the Milwaukee Brewers. He hit a walk-off home run against the Athletics on June 24. Following the season, he was non-tendered by the Giants and became a free agent.

== Personal life ==
On June 24, 2026, the girlfriend of Bericoto's brother Jose was killed in the 2026 Venezuela earthquakes.
