= Philip Abner =

American baseball player (born 2002)

Washington Nationals
- Pitcher
- Born: May 5, 2002 (age 24); Charlotte, North Carolina, U.S.
- Bats: Left Throws: Left

MLB debut
- September 19, 2025, for the Arizona Diamondbacks

MLB statistics (through 2026 season)
- Win–loss record: 0–0
- Earned run average: 6.75
- Strikeouts: 15
- Stats at Baseball Reference

Teams
- Arizona Diamondbacks (2025–2026); San Francisco Giants (2026)

Philip James Abner (born May 5, 2002) is an American professional baseball pitcher for the Washington Nationals of Major League Baseball (MLB). He has previously played in MLB for the Arizona Diamondbacks and San Francisco Giants.

== Amateur career ==
A native of Charlotte, North Carolina, Abner played college baseball at the University of Florida. In 2022, he played collegiate summer baseball with the Falmouth Commodores of the Cape Cod Baseball League and was named a league all-star.

== Professional career ==
=== Arizona Diamondbacks ===
The Arizona Diamondbacks selected Abner in the sixth round of the 2023 Major League Baseball draft. He made his professional debut with the Single-A Visalia Rawhide. In 2024, Abner made 26 appearances (two starts) split between the High-A Hillsboro Hops, Visalia, and the rookie-level Arizona Complex League Diamondbacks, accumulating a 3–0 record and 1.85 ERA with 38 strikeouts over 34 innings of work.

On September 18, 2025, Abner was selected to the 40-man roster and promoted to the major leagues for the first time. He would make his debut the following day against the Philadelphia Phillies, pitching for 2/3 innings while letting up one hit and striking out both Kyle Schwarber and Brandon Marsh. Abner made five appearances for the Diamondbacks during his rookie campaign, recording a 4.91 ERA with five strikeouts across 3 2/3 innings pitched.

Abner was optioned to Triple-A Reno to begin the 2026 season. He made eight appearances for the Diamondbacks, struggling to a 6.28 ERA with six strikeouts across 14 1/3 innings pitched. Abner was designated for assignment by Arizona on August 16, 2026.

=== San Francisco Giants ===
On August 19, 2026, Abner was claimed off waivers by the San Francisco Giants. On September 7, Abner was recalled. After multiple pitching blow-ups, including giving up four home runs in one inning of work on September 18 against the Los Angeles Dodgers, Abner was optioned on September 20 and designated for assignment the following day.

=== Washington Nationals ===
On September 23, 2026, Abner was claimed off waivers by the New York Mets. On November 2, Abner was claimed off of waivers by the Baltimore Orioles. On November 17, Abner was claimed off of waivers for a third time, this time by the Washington Nationals.
