= Bo Davidson =

American baseball player (born 2002)

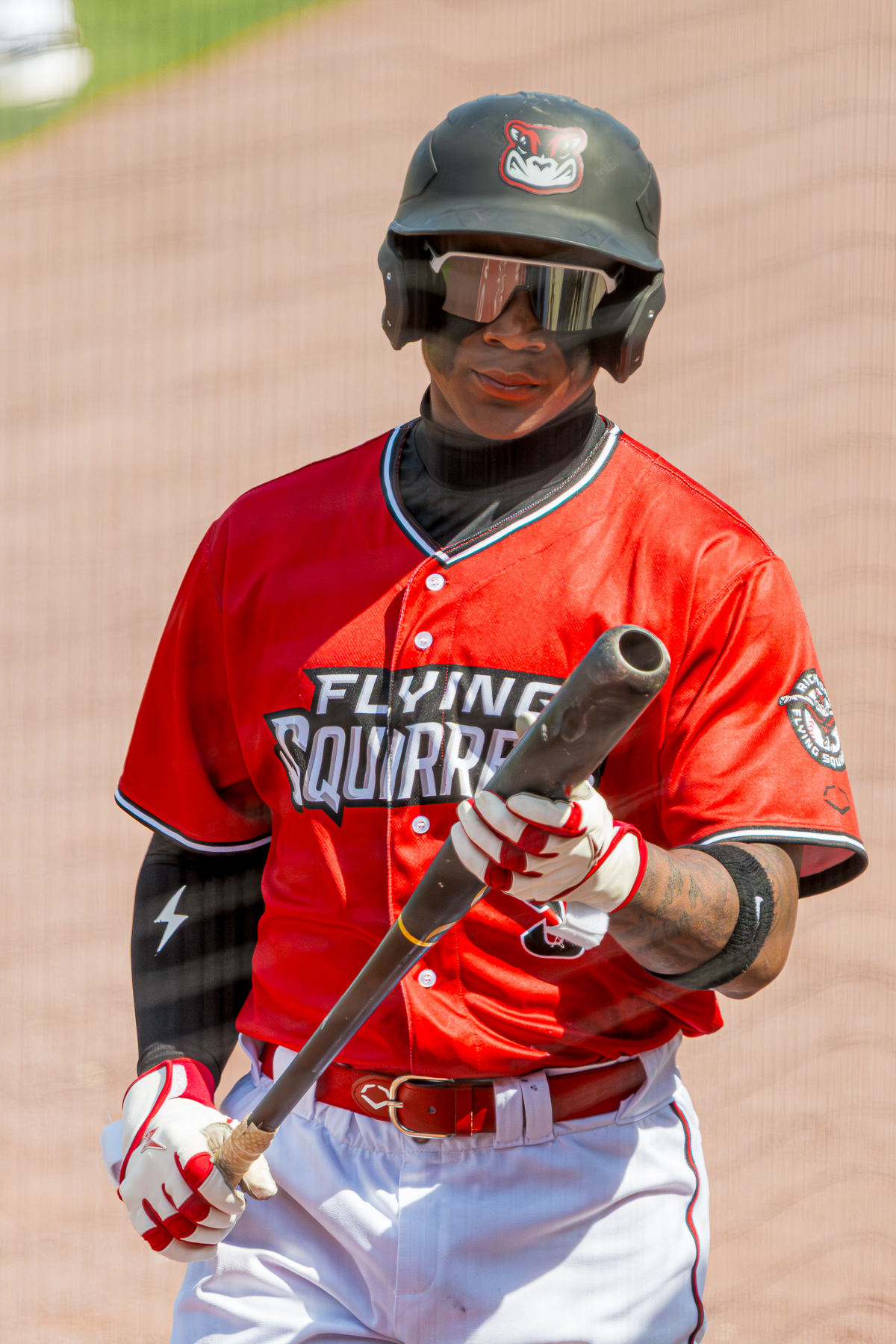

San Francisco Giants – No. 94
- Outfielder
- Born: July 5, 2002 (age 24); Charlotte, North Carolina, U.S.
- Bats: Left Throws: Right

MLB debut
- September 21, 2026, for the San Francisco Giants

MLB statistics (through 2026 season)
- Batting average: .350
- Home runs: 0
- Runs batted in: 1
- Stats at Baseball Reference

Teams
- San Francisco Giants (2026–present)

Chanteyon Ajria Davidson (born July 5, 2002) is an American professional baseball outfielder for the San Francisco Giants of Major League Baseball (MLB).

== Early career ==
Davidson attended South Mecklenburg High School in Charlotte, North Carolina and played college baseball at Caldwell Community College & Technical Institute.

== Professional career ==
After going undrafted, Davidson signed with the San Francisco Giants as an undrafted free agent in 2023. He made his professional debut that year with the Arizona Complex League Giants.

Davidson played for the ACL Giants and San Jose Giants in 2024, batting a cumulative .327/.437/.605 with 11 home runs, 48 RBI, and seven stolen bases across 63 total games. After the season, he played in the Arizona Fall League for the Scottsdale Scorpions. In 2025, Davidson made 114 combined appearances for the High–A Eugene Emeralds and Double–A Richmond Flying Squirrels, posting a .281/.376/.469 slash line with 18 home runs, 70 RBI, and 19 stolen bases.

Davidson was assigned to Richmond to begin the 2026 season, and was later promoted to the Triple–A Sacramento River Cats. Across 125 appearances for the two affiliates, he slashed a combined .290/.361/.527 with 29 home runs, 94 RBI, and 20 stolen bases (all career–highs). On September 21, Davidson's contract was selected by the Giants, and he was promoted to the major leagues for the first time. He made his debut later that day, going 1-4 with a stolen base, becoming the first Giant to record a hit, steal a base and score a run in his major league debut since Johnny Vergez in 1931.
