= Jerar Encarnación =

Dominican baseball player (born 1997)

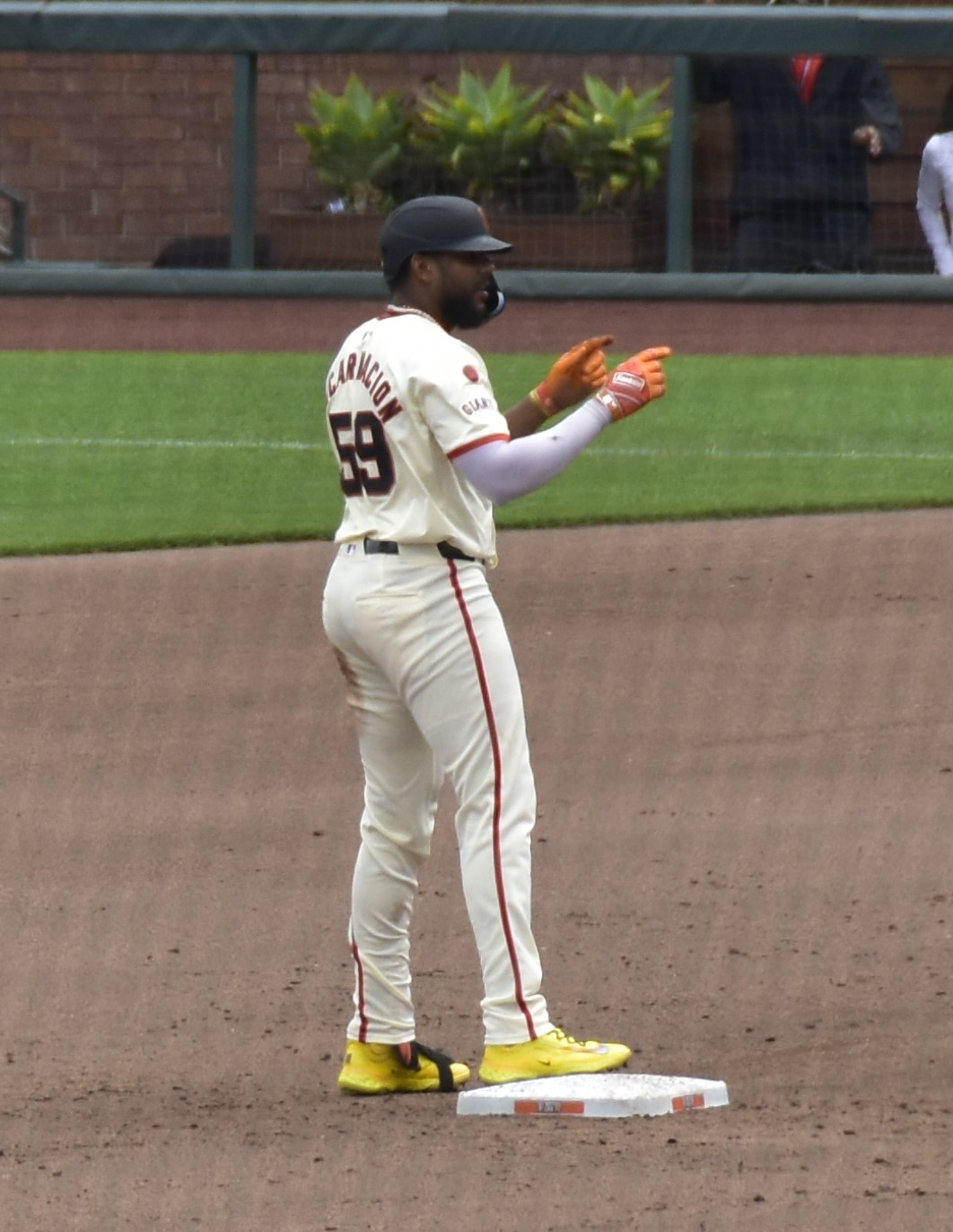
- Encarnación with the San Francisco Giants in 2024

Yokohama DeNA BayStars – No. 69
- Outfielder
- Born: October 22, 1997 (age 28); Bayaguana, Dominican Republic
- Bats: Right Throws: Right

Professional debut
- MLB: June 19, 2022, for the Miami Marlins
- NPB: July 2, 2026, for the Yokohama DeNA BayStars

MLB statistics (through May 3, 2026)
- Batting average: .211
- Home runs: 10
- Runs batted in: 40

NPB statistics (through August 18, 2026)
- Batting average: .296
- Home runs: 9
- Runs batted in: 32
- Stats at Baseball Reference

Teams
- Miami Marlins (2022); San Francisco Giants (2024–2026); Yokohama DeNA BayStars (2026–present)

Jerar Luis Encarnación (born October 22, 1997) is a Dominican professional baseball outfielder for the Yokohama DeNA BayStars of Nippon Professional Baseball (NPB). He has previously played in Major League Baseball (MLB) for the Miami Marlins and San Francisco Giants.

== Early life ==
Jerar Encarnación was born in Bayaguana, Dominican Republic, to parents Manuel and Carmela. His elder brother Anderson died in 2019.

== Professional career ==
=== Miami Marlins ===
Encarnación signed with the Miami Marlins as an international free agent on September 8, 2015. He made his professional debut with the Dominican Summer League Marlins in 2016. Encarnación played 2017 with the Gulf Coast Marlins, 2018 with the Batavia Muckdogs and Greensboro Grasshoppers and 2019 with the Clinton LumberKings and Jupiter Hammerheads. After the season, he played in the Arizona Fall League.

Encarnación was invited to spring training by the Marlins in 2020. That year, the Minor League Baseball season was cancelled due to the COVID-19 pandemic, and he did not play in any games. On November 20, 2020, the Marlins added Encarnación to their 40-man roster to protect him from the Rule 5 draft.

Encarnación spent the majority of the 2021 season with the Double–A Pensacola Blue Wahoos, also playing in four games for Jupiter. In 63 games with Pensacola, he hit .222/.308/.400 with nine home runs, 28 RBI, and five stolen bases.

On June 19, 2022, Encarnación made his MLB debut for the Miami Marlins. He hit a grand slam for his first major league hit as the Marlins defeated the New York Mets. In 23 games in his rookie campaign, he batted .182/.210/.338 with 3 home runs and 14 RBI.

Encarnación was optioned to the Triple-A Jacksonville Jumbo Shrimp to begin the 2023 season. In 84 games for Jacksonville, he hit .211 with 19 home runs and 54 RBI. On July 21, 2023, Encarnación was removed from the 40-man roster and sent outright to Triple–A. He elected free agency following the season on November 6.

=== Guerreros de Oaxaca ===
On January 24, 2024, Encarnación signed with the Guerreros de Oaxaca of the Mexican League. In 26 games for the Guerreros, he batted .366/.439/.989 with 19 home runs and 36 RBI. On May 16, Encarnación was released to pursue an opportunity with an MLB organization. At the time of his release, he was leading the league in home runs, runs scored (33), and OPS (1.428).

=== San Francisco Giants ===
On May 16, 2024, Encarnación signed a minor league contract with the San Francisco Giants. In 33 games for the Triple–A Sacramento River Cats, he batted .352/.438/.616 with 10 home runs and 33 RBI. On August 2, the Giants selected Encarnación's contract, adding him to their active roster. In 35 appearances for San Francisco, he batted .248/.277/.425 with five home runs, 19 RBI, and one stolen base.

On March 23, 2025, it was announced that Encarnación would require surgery to repair a left hand fracture he suffered during a spring training game. He was subsequently given a recovery timetable of eight weeks. Encarnación appeared in 19 total games for San Francisco, slashing .200/.214/.364 with two home runs, seven RBI, and one stolen base.

Encarnación made 17 appearances for the Giants in 2026, hitting .176/.200/.206 with one walk. On May 4, 2026, Encarnación was designated for assignment by San Francisco following the promotions of Bryce Eldridge and Jesús Rodríguez. He elected free agency after clearing waivers on May 10.

=== Yokohama DeNA BayStars ===
On June 11, 2026, Encarnación signed with the Yokohama DeNA BayStars of Nippon Professional Baseball.

== See also ==
- List of Major League Baseball players from the Dominican Republic
