= Nate Furman =

American baseball player (born 2001)

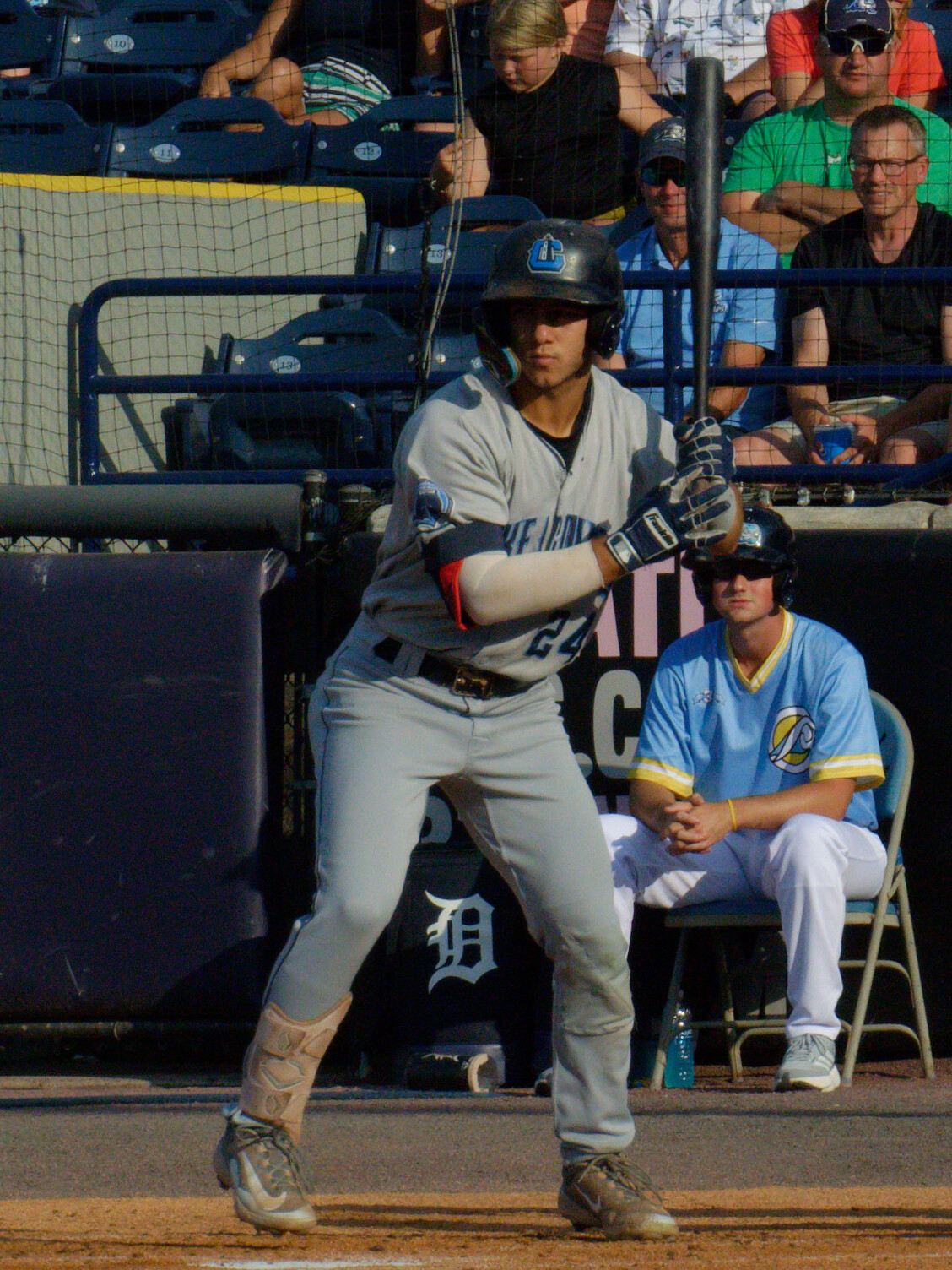
- Furman with the Lake County Captains in 2023

Washington Nationals
- Infielder
- Born: July 23, 2001 (age 25); Brookhaven, Pennsylvania, U.S.
- Bats: Left Throws: Right

MLB debut
- August 1, 2026, for the San Francisco Giants

MLB statistics (through 2026 season)
- Batting average: .125
- Runs batted in: 3
- Home runs: 0
- Stats at Baseball Reference

Teams
- San Francisco Giants (2026)

Nathan Walter Furman (born July 23, 2001) is an American professional baseball infielder for the Washington Nationals of Major League Baseball (MLB). He debuted in MLB in 2026 with the San Francisco Giants.

== Career ==
Furman attended Monsignor Bonner and Archbishop Prendergast High School in Upper Darby Township, Pennsylvania. He enrolled at the University of North Carolina at Charlotte and played college baseball for the UNC-Charlotte 49ers. In 2022, he played collegiate summer baseball with the Orleans Firebirds of the Cape Cod Baseball League.

=== San Francisco Giants ===
The Cleveland Guardians selected Furman in the fourth round of the 2022 Major League Baseball draft. On August 28, 2024, Furman was traded by the Guardians to the San Francisco Giants as the player to be named later from the July 30 trade for Alex Cobb.

On August 1, 2026, Furman was promoted to the major leagues for the first time.

=== Washington Nationals ===
On November 1, the Giants traded Furman to the Washington Nationals in exchange for pitcher Tony Neubeck.
