= Dakota Jordan =

American baseball player (born 2003)

San Francisco Giants
- Outfielder
- Born: May 9, 2003 (age 23); Canton, Mississippi, U.S.
- Bats: Right Throws: Right
- Stats at Baseball Reference

Dakota DyMon Jordan (born May 9, 2003) is an American professional baseball outfielder in the San Francisco Giants organization.

== Amateur career ==
Jordan attended Jackson Academy in Jackson, Mississippi, where he played baseball and football. As a senior he was named the Mississippi Gatorade Baseball Player of the Year after he hit .524 with 16 home runs and 57 runs batted in (RBI). He finished his career with school records in home runs, batting average, RBI, slugging percentage and on-base percentage. Jordan committed to Mississippi State University to play college baseball.

As a freshman at Mississippi State in 2023, Jordan played in 44 games and hit .307/.397/.575 with 10 home runs and 40 RBI over 153 at-bats. After the season he entered the transfer portal before deciding to return to Mississippi State.

== Professional career ==
Jordan entered his sophomore season in 2024 as a top prospect for the 2024 Major League Baseball draft. Jordan was selected by the San Francisco Giants in the fourth round, with the 116th overall pick in the draft. On July 30, 2024, he signed with the Giants on a contract worth $1,997,500.
