= Scott Bandura =

American baseball player (born 2001)

- Bandura with the Richmond Flying Squirrels in 2026

San Francisco Giants – No. 91
- Outfielder
- Born: August 2, 2001 (age 25); Philadelphia, Pennsylvania, U.S.
- Bats: Left Throws: Right

MLB debut
- September 13, 2026, for the San Francisco Giants

MLB statistics (through 2026 season)
- Batting average: .207
- Home runs: 0
- Runs batted in: 1
- Stats at Baseball Reference

Teams
- San Francisco Giants (2026–present)

Scott Leonard Bandura (born August 2, 2001) is an American professional baseball outfielder for the San Francisco Giants of Major League Baseball (MLB).

== Early career ==
Bandura grew up in Philadelphia and played for Taney Little League in the 2014 Little League World Series. He attended Springside Chestnut Hill Academy in Philadelphia before playing college baseball at Princeton University. In 2023 with Princeton, he played in 47 games and hit .363 with 12 home runs and 45 RBI. Later in 2023, he played collegiate summer baseball with the Falmouth Commodores of the Cape Cod Baseball League.

== Professional career ==
Bandura was selected by the San Francisco Giants in the seventh round of the 2023 Major League Baseball draft. He made his professional debut after signing with the Arizona Complex League Giants and also played with the San Jose Giants, batting a combined .266 with three home runs across 28 games played. He returned to San Jose to open the 2024 season, and also played with the Complex League and Eugene Emeralds. Over 85 games played for the season, he hit .242 with six home runs and 43 RBI. In 2025, he played with Eugene and the Richmond Flying Squirrels and batted .271 with ten home runs, 65 RBI and 41 stolen bases across 126 games played. Bandura returned to Richmond to begin the 2026 season and was promoted to the Sacramento River Cats in May. Across 131 games between the two teams, he had a .320 batting average, 13 home runs, 94 RBI, and 34 stolen bases. He recorded 163 hits which were third most in the minor leagues.

On September 13, 2026, Bandura's contract was selected by the Giants, and he was promoted to the major leagues for the first time. He made his major league debut later that day as the team's designated hitter. He finished the game 1-for-3 with an infield single off San Diego Padres reliever Kyle Hart, two strikeouts, and a walk. Bandura played in a total of 13 games for the Giants and hit .207 with one RBI and 17 strikeouts over 29 at bats.
