= Turner Hill (baseball) =

American baseball player (born 1999)

San Francisco Giants – No. 52
- Outfielder
- Born: April 4, 1999 (age 27); Marietta, Ohio, U.S.
- Bats: Left Throws: Left

MLB debut
- August 15, 2026, for the San Francisco Giants

MLB statistics (through 2026 season)
- Batting average: .219
- Home runs: 1
- Runs batted in: 16
- Stats at Baseball Reference

Teams
- San Francisco Giants (2026–present)

Turner Hill (born April 4, 1999) is an American professional baseball outfielder for the San Francisco Giants of Major League Baseball (MLB). He made his MLB debut in 2026.

== Career ==
Hill attended Marietta High School in Marietta, Ohio and played college baseball at Malone University and Marietta College. He signed with the San Francisco Giants as an undrafted free agent on May 12, 2023, having gone unselected in the 2022 Major League Baseball draft. He made his professional debut with the Single–A San Jose Giants, hitting .287 with 30 RBI and 27 stolen bases; he also received a two–game cup of coffee with the Triple–A Sacramento River Cats.

Hill split the 2024 season between the High–A Eugene Emeralds, Double–A Richmond Flying Squirrels, and Sacramento. In 109 appearances for the three affiliates, he batted a cumulative .265/.366/.360 with three home runs, 45 RBI, and 30 stolen bases. Hill made 87 appearances split between Sacramento, Richmond, and the rookie–level Arizona Complex League Giants during the 2025 season, batting a combined .266/.365/.378 with two home runs, 29 RBI, and 20 stolen bases.

Hill began the 2026 season with Richmond before being quickly promoted to Sacramento; in 88 appearances for the River Cats, he slashed .353/.420/.529 with nine home runs, 60 RBI, and 23 stolen bases. On August 11, 2026, Hill homered to extend his hitting streak to 26 consecutive games, passing Daric Barton for the Sacramento franchise record. On August 13, Hill was selected to the 40–man roster and promoted to the major leagues for the first time.
