= Drew Cavanaugh =

American baseball player (born 2002)

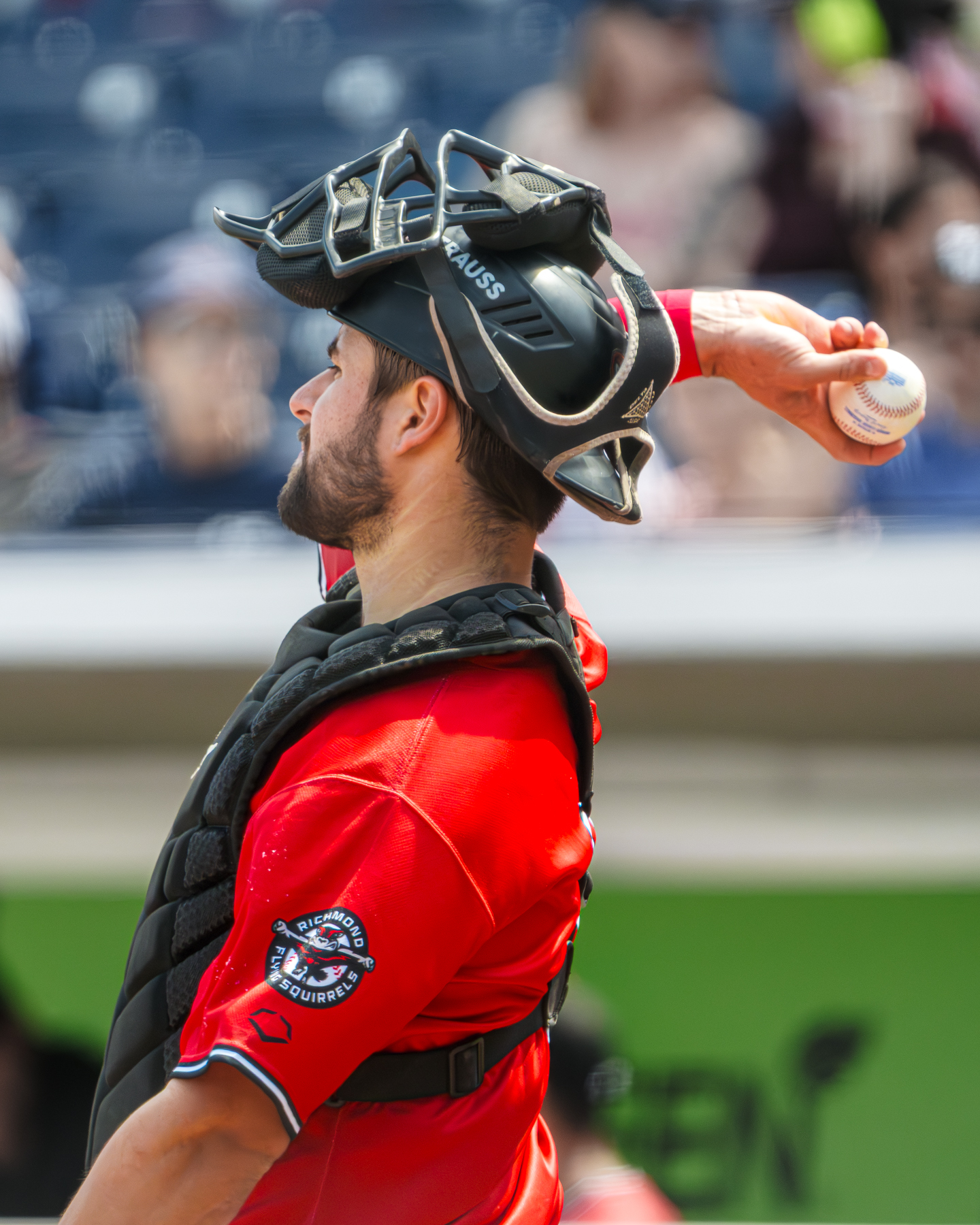
- Cavanaugh with the Richmond Flying Squirrels in 2026

San Francisco Giants – No. 61
- Catcher
- Born: January 27, 2002 (age 24); Troy, Michigan, U.S.
- Bats: Left Throws: Right

MLB debut
- June 26, 2026, for the San Francisco Giants

MLB statistics (through 2026 season)
- Batting average: .229
- Home runs: 1
- Runs batted in: 12
- Stats at Baseball Reference

Teams
- San Francisco Giants (2026–present)

Drew Michael Cavanaugh (born January 27, 2002) is an American professional baseball catcher for the San Francisco Giants of Major League Baseball (MLB).

== Amateur career ==
Cavanaugh attended Stoney Creek High School in Rochester Hills, Michigan before transferring to IMG Academy in Bradenton, Florida for his senior year. He played college baseball at Eastern Florida State College and Florida Southern College.

== Professional career ==
Cavanauagh was selected by the San Francisco Giants in the 17th round of the 2023 Major League Baseball draft.

Cavanaugh spent his first professional season with the Arizona Complex League Giants and San Jose Giants. He played 2024 with San Jose and the Sacramento River Cats and after the season played in the Arizona Fall League. He played 2025 with San Jose, Eugene Emeralds, Double-A Richmond Flying Squirrels, and Sacramento.

Cavanaugh started 2026 with Richmond before being promoted to Sacramento. In 32 appearances for the River Cats, he batted .330/.445/.571 with six home runs, 21 RBI, and three stolen bases. On June 26, 2026, Cavanaugh was selected to the 40-man roster and promoted to the major leagues for the first time. On September 12, Cavanaugh hit his first career home run off of Bradgley Rodríguez of the San Diego Padres.
