= Trent Harris (baseball) =

American baseball player (born 2002)

San Francisco Giants – No. 68
- Pitcher
- Born: January 22, 1999 (age 27); Cary, North Carolina, U.S.
- Bats: Right Throws: Right

MLB debut
- August 8, 2026, for the San Francisco Giants

MLB statistics (through 2026 season)
- Win–loss record: 0–1
- Earned run average: 2.31
- Strikeouts: 27
- Stats at Baseball Reference

Teams
- San Francisco Giants (2026–present)

Trenton Lee Harris (born January 22, 1999) is an American professional baseball pitcher for the San Francisco Giants of Major League Baseball (MLB). He made his MLB debut in 2026.

== Amateur career ==
Harris attended Heritage High School in Wake Forest, North Carolina before transferring to Pro5 Baseball Academy in Holly Springs, North Carolina for his senior year. He played college baseball at High Point University for three years and the University of North Carolina at Pembroke for two.

== Professional career ==
Harris signed with the San Francisco Giants as an undrafted free agent in 2023. He spent his first professional season with the Arizona Complex League Giants and San Jose Giants. He split the 2024 season between San Jose, the Eugene Emeralds, and the Richmond Flying Squirrels.

On August 7, 2026, Harris was selected to the 40-man roster and promoted to the major leagues for the first time. He made his major league debut the following day. On September 9, Harris logged his first career save, recording a scoreless ninth inning during a 7–6 victory over the St. Louis Cardinals.
