= 2025 Arizona Diamondbacks season =

2025 Arizona Diamondbacks
- League: National League
- Division: West
- Ballpark: Chase Field
- City: Phoenix, Arizona
- Record: 80–82 (.494)
- Divisional place: 4th
- Owners: Ken Kendrick
- General managers: Mike Hazen
- Managers: Torey Lovullo
- Television: MLB.tv; Games distributed to local cable providers like YurView Arizona
- Radio: KMVP-FM (98.7)
- Stats: ESPN.com; Baseball Reference

The 2025 Arizona Diamondbacks season was the franchise's 28th season in Major League Baseball and their 28th season at Chase Field in Phoenix, Arizona, as members of the National League West. They were managed by Torey Lovullo in his ninth season with the franchise.

The Diamondbacks faced a significant number of injuries in 2025, particularly to their pitching staff, with several players undergoing season-ending Tommy John surgery, including recent free-agent signee ace pitcher Corbin Burnes and high leverage relievers A.J. Puk and Justin Martinez. At the trade deadline, the team traded longtime rotation stalwart Merrill Kelly to the Texas Rangers.

On September 26, with a loss to the San Diego Padres, the team was eliminated from playoff contention.

The Arizona Diamondbacks drew an average home attendance of 29,555, the 18th-highest of all MLB teams.

== Offseason ==
The Diamondbacks finished the 2024 season with a record of 89–73, an improvement on their 84–78 from 2023, in which they made the World Series. However, they missed the playoffs due to losing the tiebreaker against the Atlanta Braves and New York Mets.

=== Transactions ===
==== October/November 2024 ====
October 31	RHP Paul Sewald, 1Bs Josh Bell and Christian Walker, INF Kevin Newman elected free agency
November 1	OF Randal Grichuk, RHP Scott McGough and DH Joc Pederson elected free agency

==== December 2024 ====
December 21	Cleveland Guardians traded 1B Josh Naylor to Arizona Diamondbacks for RHP Slade Cecconi.
December 30	Diamondbacks signed right-handed pitcher Corbin Burnes to a 6-year, $210 million contract.

==== March 2025 ====
March 22	Diamondbacks signed right-handed pitcher Justin Martínez to a 5-year, $18 million contract extension.
March 26	Diamondbacks signed left-handed pitcher Jalen Beeks to a 1-year, $1.25 million contract.
March 28	Diamondbacks signed right-handed pitcher Brandon Pfaadt to a 5-year, $45 million contract extension.

==== April 2025 ====
April 2	Diamondbacks signed 2B Ketel Marte to a 6-year, $116.5 million contract extension.
April 20	Diamondbacks released 3B Grae Kessinger.

==== May 2025 ====
May 14	Diamondbacks traded left-handed pitcher José Castillo to the New York Mets for cash.

==== July 2025 ====
July 23	Diamondbacks traded 1B Josh Naylor to the Seattle Mariners for LHP Brandyn Garcia and RPH Ashton Izzi.
July 26	Diamondbacks traded OF Randal Grichuk to the Kansas City Royals for RPH Andrew Hoffman.
July 31	Diamondbacks traded LHP Jordan Montgomery and Shelby Miller to the Milwaukee Brewers for a player to be named later.
July 31	Diamondbacks traded RHP Merrill Kelly to the Texas Rangers for LHP Kohl Drake, Mitch Bratt and RHP David Hagama.
July 31	Diamondbacks traded 3B Eugenio Suárez to the Seattle Mariners for 1B Tyler Locklear, RHP Hunter Cranton and Juan Burgos.

== Season standings ==
=== National League West ===
NL West
Team	W	L	Pct.	GB	Home	Road
Los Angeles Dodgers	93	69	.574	—	52‍–‍29	41‍–‍40
San Diego Padres	90	72	.556	3	52‍–‍29	38‍–‍43
San Francisco Giants	81	81	.500	12	42‍–‍39	39‍–‍42
Arizona Diamondbacks	80	82	.494	13	43‍–‍38	37‍–‍44
Colorado Rockies	43	119	.265	50	25‍–‍56	18‍–‍63

=== National League Wild Card ===
Division leaders
Team	W	L	Pct.
Milwaukee Brewers	97	65	.599
Philadelphia Phillies	96	66	.593
Los Angeles Dodgers	93	69	.574

Wild Card teams (Top 3 teams qualify for postseason)
Team	W	L	Pct.	GB
Chicago Cubs	92	70	.568	+9
San Diego Padres	90	72	.556	+7
Cincinnati Reds	83	79	.512	—
New York Mets	83	79	.512	—
San Francisco Giants	81	81	.500	2
Arizona Diamondbacks	80	82	.494	3
Miami Marlins	79	83	.488	4
St. Louis Cardinals	78	84	.481	5
Atlanta Braves	76	86	.469	7
Pittsburgh Pirates	71	91	.438	12
Washington Nationals	66	96	.407	17
Colorado Rockies	43	119	.265	40

=== Record vs. opponents ===
==== Record vs. National League ====
2025 National League record Source: MLB Standings Grid – 2025
Team	AZ	ATL	CHC	CIN	COL	LAD	MIA	MIL	NYM	PHI	PIT	SD	SF	STL	WSH	AL
Arizona	—	4–2	3–4	2–4	8–5	6–7	3–3	4–3	3–3	3–3	2–4	5–8	7–6	3–3	2–4	25–23
Atlanta	2–4	—	2–4	5–2	4–2	1–5	8–5	2–4	8–5	5–8	2–4	1–6	1–5	4–2	9–4	22–26
Chicago	4–3	4–2	—	5–8	5–1	4–3	4–2	7–6	2–4	2–4	10–3	3–3	1–5	8–5	3–3	30–18
Cincinnati	4–2	2–5	8–5	—	5–1	1–5	3–4	5–8	4–2	3–3	7–6	4–2	3–3	6–7	2–4	26–22
Colorado	5–8	2–4	1–5	1–5	—	2–11	3–3	2–4	0–6	0–7	2–4	3–10	2–11	4–2	4–3	12–36
Los Angeles	7–6	5–1	3–4	5–1	11–2	—	5–1	0–6	3–4	2–4	2–4	9–4	9–4	2–4	3–3	27–21
Miami	3–3	5–8	2–4	4–3	3–3	1–5	—	3–3	7–6	4–9	4–3	3–3	4–2	3–3	7–6	26–22
Milwaukee	3–4	4–2	6–7	8–5	4–2	6–0	3–3	—	4–2	4–2	10–3	2–4	2–5	7–6	6–0	28–20
New York	3–3	5–8	4–2	2–4	6–0	4–3	6–7	2–4	—	7–6	2–4	2–4	4–2	5–2	7–6	24–24
Philadelphia	3–3	8–5	4–2	3–3	7–0	4–2	9–4	2–4	6–7	—	3–3	3–3	3–4	2–4	8–5	31–17
Pittsburgh	4–2	4–2	3–10	6–7	4–2	4–2	3–4	3–10	4–2	3–3	—	1–5	4–2	7–6	4–3	17–31
San Diego	8–5	6–1	3–3	2–4	10–3	4–9	3–3	4–2	4–2	3–3	5–1	—	10–3	4–3	4–2	20–28
San Francisco	6–7	5–1	5–1	3–3	11–2	4–9	2–4	5–2	2–4	4–3	2–4	3–10	—	2–4	3–3	24–24
St. Louis	3–3	2–4	5–8	7–6	2–4	4–2	3–3	6–7	2–5	4–2	6–7	3–4	4–2	—	5–1	22–26
Washington	4–2	4–9	3–3	4–2	3–4	3–3	6–7	0–6	6–7	5–8	3–4	2–4	3–3	1–5	—	19–29

Updated with the results of all games through September 28, 2025.

==== Record vs. American League ====
2025 National League record vs. American League Source: MLB Standings
Team	ATH	BAL	BOS	CWS	CLE	DET	HOU	KC	LAA	MIN	NYY	SEA	TB	TEX	TOR
Arizona	2–1	2–1	2–1	2–1	2–1	0–3	0–3	1–2	1–2	2–1	2–1	3–0	1–2	4–2	1–2
Atlanta	1–2	0–3	3–3	2–1	3–0	3–0	1–2	1–2	1–2	3–0	1–2	1–2	1–2	0–3	1–2
Chicago	3–0	2–1	2–1	5–1	3–0	1–2	1–2	1–2	3–0	1–2	2–1	1–2	2–1	2–1	1–2
Cincinnati	0–3	2–1	1–2	1–2	5–1	2–1	1–2	2–1	2–1	2–1	2–1	1–2	3–0	1–2	1–2
Colorado	1–2	1–2	0–3	1–2	1–2	0–3	2–4	0–3	2–1	2–1	1–2	0–3	1–2	0–3	0–3
Los Angeles	2–1	1–2	1–2	3–0	2–1	3–0	0–3	2–1	0–6	2–1	2–1	3–0	2–1	2–1	2–1
Miami	1–2	2–1	1–2	1–2	1–2	2–1	1–2	2–1	2–1	2–1	3–0	1–2	3–3	3–0	1–2
Milwaukee	2–1	2–1	3–0	2–1	1–2	2–1	2–1	2–1	3–0	4–2	0–3	2–1	1–2	0–3	2–1
New York	2–1	1–2	1–2	2–1	0–3	2–1	1–2	2–1	3–0	1–2	3–3	2–1	0–3	1–2	3–0
Philadelphia	2–1	2–1	2–1	1–2	2–1	2–1	0–3	2–1	1–2	2–1	2–1	3–0	3–0	3–0	4–2
Pittsburgh	2–1	0–3	2–1	0–3	0–3	4–2	1–2	0–3	2–1	1–2	1–2	0–3	1–2	1–2	2–1
San Diego	2–1	0–3	2–1	2–1	3–0	1–2	1–2	2–1	2–1	1–2	1–2	1–5	0–3	2–1	0–3
San Francisco	5–1	2–1	2–1	1–2	1–2	0–3	3–0	1–2	1–2	0–3	2–1	3–0	1–2	2–1	0–3
St. Louis	2–1	2–1	0–3	3–0	3–0	1–2	2–1	3–3	1–2	3–0	0–3	0–3	1–2	1–2	0–3
Washington	1–2	5–1	0–3	1–2	1–2	2–1	1–2	1–2	2–1	2–1	0–3	2–1	0–3	1–2	0–3

Updated with the results of all games through September 28, 2025.

== Game log ==
=== Regular season ===
Legend
	Diamondbacks win
	Diamondbacks loss
	Postponement
	Eliminated from playoff contention
**Bold**	Diamondbacks team member

2025 Game Log: 80–82 (Home: 43–38; Away: 37–44)
March/April: 16–14 (Home: 8–8; Away: 8–6)

#	Date	Opponent	Score	Win	Loss	Save	Attendance	Record	Streak
1	March 27	Cubs	6–10	Steele (1–1)	**Gallen** (0–1)	—	49,070	0–1	L1
2	March 28	Cubs	8–1	**Kelly** (1–0)	Taillon (0–1)	—	37,449	1–1	W1
3	March 29	Cubs	3–4	Imanaga (1–0)	**Pfaadt** (0–1)	Pressly (1)	36,407	1–2	L1
4	March 30	Cubs	10–6	**Martínez** (1–0)	Morgan (0–1)	—	39,145	2–2	W1
5	April 1	@ Yankees	7–5	**Miller** (1–0)	Leiter Jr. (0–1)	**Puk** (1)	37,482	3–2	W2
6	April 2	@ Yankees	4–3	**Gallen** (1–1)	Rodón (1–1)	**Puk** (2)	40,558	4–2	W3
7	April 3	@ Yankees	7–9	Carrasco (1–0)	**Kelly** (1–1)	Weaver (1)	43,382	4–3	L1
8	April 4	@ Nationals	6–4	**Pfaadt** (1–1)	Ferrer (0–2)	**Martínez** (1)	18,974	5–3	W1
9	April 5	@ Nationals	3–4	Parker (2–0)	**Rodríguez** (0–1)	Finnegan (2)	25,916	5–4	L1
10	April 6	@ Nationals	4–5	Williams (1–0)	**Burnes** (0–1)	Finnegan (3)	14,528	5–5	L2
11	April 7	Orioles	1–5	Eflin (2–1)	**Gallen** (1–2)	—	20,333	5–6	L3
12	April 8	Orioles	4–3	**Kelly** (2–1)	Morton (0–3)	**Martínez** (2)	23,843	6–6	W1
13	April 9	Orioles	9–0	**Pfaadt** (2–1)	Kremer (1–2)	—	22,411	7–6	W2
14	April 11	Brewers	0–7	Quintana (1–0)	**Rodríguez** (0–2)	—	32,026	7–7	L1
15	April 12	Brewers	5–4	**R. Nelson** (1–0)	Megill (0–1)	—	34,853	8–7	W1
16	April 13	Brewers	5–2	**Beeks** (1–0)	Hudson (0–1)	**Puk** (3)	30,057	9–7	W2
17	April 15	@ Marlins	10–4	**Kelly** (3–1)	Gillispie (0–2)	—	7,324	10–7	W3
18	April 16	@ Marlins	6–2	**Pfaadt** (3–1)	Meyer (1–2)	—	8,438	11–7	W4
19	April 17	@ Marlins	6–4	**Rodríguez** (1–2)	Cabrera (0–1)	**Puk** (4)	8,616	12–7	W5
20	April 18	@ Cubs	11–13	Pressly (2–1)	**Mantiply** (0–1)	―	39,109	12–8	L1
21	April 19	@ Cubs	2–6	Thielbar (1–0)	**Gallen** (1–3)	—	36,002	12–9	L2
22	April 20	@ Cubs	3–2 (11)	**Miller** (2–0)	Wicks (0–1)	**Jameson** (1)	29,062	13–9	W1
23	April 22	Rays	5–1	**Pfaadt** (4–1)	Littell (0–5)	—	21,810	14–9	W2
24	April 23	Rays	6–7 (11)	Fairbanks (2–1)	**Jameson** (0–1)	Orze (1)	16,100	14–10	L1
25	April 24	Rays	4–7 (10)	Uceta (2–1)	**Feyereisen** (0–1)	Fairbanks (4)	20,661	14–11	L2
26	April 25	Braves	2–8	Sale (1–2)	**Gallen** (1–4)	—	31,023	14–12	L3
27	April 26	Braves	7–8 (10)	Iglesias (1–2)	**Martínez** (1–1)	Lee (1)	43,043	14–13	L4
28	April 27	Braves	6–4	**Pfaadt** (5–1)	Schwellenbach (1–2)	**Martínez** (3)	33,544	15–13	W1
29	April 29	@ Mets	3–8	Peterson (2–1)	**Rodríguez** (1–3)	—	35,218	15–14	L1
30	April 30	@ Mets	4–3	**Burnes** (1–1)	Stanek (0–3)	**Thompson** (1)	31,904	16–14	W1

May: 12–17 (Home: 6–9; Away: 6–8)

#	Date	Opponent	Score	Win	Loss	Save	Attendance	Record	Streak
31	May 1	@ Mets	4–2	**Gallen** (2–4)	Senga (3–2)	**Miller** (1)	36,239	17–14	W2
32	May 2	@ Phillies	2–3	Banks (1–0)	**Castillo** (0–1)	Alvarado (6)	40,133	17–15	L1
33	May 3	@ Phillies	2–7	Nola (1–5)	**Pfaadt** (5–2)	—	42,650	17–16	L2
34	May 4	@ Phillies	11–9 (10)	**Miller** (3–0)	Alvarado (3–1)	**Beeks** (1)	44,010	18–16	W1
35	May 5	Mets	4–5	Canning (5–1)	**R. Nelson** (1–1)	Díaz (8)	22,674	18–17	L1
36	May 6	Mets	5–1	**Gallen** (3–4)	Peterson (2–2)	—	24,353	19–17	W1
37	May 7	Mets	1–7	Senga (4–2)	**Kelly** (3–2)	—	25,729	19–18	L1
38	May 8	Dodgers	5–3	**Pfaadt** (6–2)	Yamamoto (4–3)	**Ginkel** (1)	40,319	20–18	W1
39	May 9	Dodgers	11–14	Vesia (1–0)	**Ginkel** (0–1)	Scott (9)	49,122	20–19	L1
40	May 10	Dodgers	3–0	**Burnes** (2–1)	May (1–3)	**R. Nelson** (1)	47,106	21–19	W1
41	May 11	Dodgers	1–8	Gonsolin (2–0)	**Gallen** (3–5)	—	46,292	21–20	L1
42	May 12	@ Giants	2–1	**Kelly** (4–2)	Verlander (0–3)	**Miller** (2)	27,387	22–20	W1
43	May 13	@ Giants	6–10	Ray (6–0)	**Pfaadt** (6–3)	—	30,960	22–21	L1
44	May 14	@ Giants	8–7	**Thompson** (1–0)	Hicks (1–5)	**Miller** (3)	30,078	23–21	W1
45	May 16	Rockies	8–0	**Burnes** (3–1)	Palmquist (0–1)	—	35,204	24–21	W2
46	May 17	Rockies	12–14	Bird (1–1)	**Thompson** (1–1)	Halvorsen (2)	35,129	24–22	L1
47	May 18	Rockies	1–0	**Kelly** (5–2)	Dollander (2–5)	**Miller** (4)	28,888	25–22	W1
48	May 19	@ Dodgers	9–5	**Pfaadt** (7–3)	Dreyer (2-2)	**Miller** (5)	41,372	26–22	W2
49	May 20	@ Dodgers	3–4 (10)	Banda (4–1)	**Miller** (3–1)	—	51,932	26–23	L1
50	May 21	@ Dodgers	1–3	May (2–4)	**Burnes** (3–2)	Scott (10)	41,517	26–24	L2
51	May 23	@ Cardinals	3–4	Mikolas (4–2)	**Gallen** (3–6)	Helsley (10)	34,214	26–25	L3
52	May 24	@ Cardinals	5–6	Helsley (2–0)	**Martínez** (1–2)	—	37,380	26–26	L4
53	May 25	@ Cardinals	3–4	King (1–0)	**Ginkel** (0–2)	Maton (2)	36,437	26–27	L5
54	May 26	Pirates	5–0	**R. Nelson** (2–1)	Heaney (3–4)	—	25,697	27–27	W1
55	May 27	Pirates	6–9	Wentz (2–1)	**Ginkel** (0–3)	Bednar (6)	20,739	27–28	L1
56	May 28	Pirates	1–10	Skenes (4–5)	**Gallen** (3–7)	—	25,202	27–29	L2
57	May 30	Nationals	7–9	Irvin (5–1)	**Morillo** (0–1)	Finnegan (16)	29,435	27–30	L3
58	May 31	Nationals	7–11	Soroka (2–3)	**Pfaadt** (7–4)	—	29,434	27–31	L4

June: 15–11 (Home: 7–4; Away: 8–7)

#	Date	Opponent	Score	Win	Loss	Save	Attendance	Record	Streak
59	June 1	Nationals	3–1	**Mena** (1–0)	Parker (4–5)	**Martínez** (4)	29,664	28–31	W1
60	June 3	@ Braves	8–3	**Gallen** (4–7)	Strider (0–4)	—	32,898	29–31	W2
61	June 4	@ Braves	2–1	**Kelly** (6–2)	Sale (3–4)	**Martínez** (5)	37,082	30–31	W3
62	June 5	@ Braves	11–10	**Graveman** (1–0)	Iglesias (3–5)	**Miller** (6)	33,902	31–31	W4
63	June 6	@ Reds	3–4 (10)	Santillan (1–1)	**Thompson** (1–2)	—	24,697	31–32	L1
64	June 7	@ Reds	1–13	Martinez (4–6)	**R. Nelson** (2–2)	—	27,951	31–33	L2
65	June 8	@ Reds	2–4	Rogers (2–2)	**Gallen** (4–8)	Santillan (2)	21,083	31–34	L3
66	June 9	Mariners	8–4 (11)	**Beeks** (2–0)	Vargas (1–5)	—	22,799	32–34	W1
67	June 10	Mariners	10–3	**Pfaadt** (8–4)	Evans (3–2)	**Jarvis** (1)	25,140	33–34	W2
68	June 11	Mariners	5–2	**Rodríguez** (2–3)	Woo (5–4)	**Miller** (7)	25,969	34–34	W3
69	June 13	Padres	5–1	**R. Nelson** (3–2)	Kolek (3–2)	—	33,052	35–34	W4
70	June 14	Padres	8–7	**Ginkel** (1–3)	Suárez (1–2)	—	37,561	36–34	W5
71	June 15	Padres	2–8	Pivetta (7–2)	**Kelly** (6–3)	—	42,676	36–35	L1
72	June 17	@ Blue Jays	4–5	Hoffman (6–2)	**Miller** (3–2)	—	38,537	36–36	L2
73	June 18	@ Blue Jays	1–8	Lauer (3–1)	**Rodríguez** (2–4)	—	27,635	36–37	L3
74	June 19	@ Blue Jays	9–5	**R. Nelson** (4–2)	Gausman (5–6)	—	33,978	37–37	W1
75	June 20	@ Rockies	14–8	**Gallen** (5–8)	Gomber (0–1)	—	31,851	38–37	W2
76	June 21	@ Rockies	5–3	**Kelly** (7–3)	Herget (0–1)	**Miller** (8)	34,076	39–37	W3
77	June 22	@ Rockies	2–4	Senzatela (3–10)	**Pfaadt** (8–5)	Halvorsen (6)	28,565	39–38	L1
78	June 23	@ White Sox	10–0	**Rodríguez** (3–4)	Smith (3–5)	**DeSclafani** (1)	12,579	40–38	W1
79	June 24	@ White Sox	4–1	**Thompson** (2–2)	Vasil (3–3)	**Miller** (9)	13,001	41–38	W2
80	June 25	@ White Sox	3–7	Burke (4–7)	**Gallen** (5–9)	—	10,217	41–39	L1
81	June 27	Marlins	8–9	Henriquez (4–1)	**Kelly** (7–4)	—	26,696	41–40	L2
82	June 28	Marlins	7–8 (10)	Bender (2–5)	**Morillo** (0–2)	—	28,446	41–41	L3
83	June 29	Marlins	4–6	Bachar (4–0)	**Beeks** (2–1)	Henriquez (3)	30,653	41–42	L4
84	June 30	Giants	4–2	**Curtiss** (1–0)	Webb (7–6)	**Miller** (10)	18,963	42–42	W1

July: 9–16 (Home: 5–7; Away: 4–9)

#	Date	Opponent	Score	Win	Loss	Save	Attendance	Record	Streak
85	July 1	Giants	8–2	**Gallen** (6–9)	Birdsong (3–3)	—	19,455	43–42	W2
86	July 2	Giants	5–6 (10)	Doval (4–2)	**Miller** (3–3)	—	17,840	43–43	L1
87	July 3	Giants	2–7	Ray (9–3)	**Pfaadt** (8–6)	—	29,769	43–44	L2
88	July 4	Royals	3–9	Bubic (7–6)	**Rodríguez** (3–5)	—	35,562	43–45	L3
89	July 5	Royals	7–1	**R. Nelson** (5–2)	Wacha (4–9)	—	26,043	44–45	W1
90	July 6	Royals	0–4	Lorenzen (5–8)	**DeSclafani** (0–1)	—	22,949	44–46	L1
91	July 7	@ Padres	6–3	**Gallen** (7–9)	Darvish (0–1)	**Ginkel** (2)	40,045	45–46	W1
92	July 8	@ Padres	0–1	Morejón (6–3)	**Kelly** (7–5)	Suárez (26)	38,670	45–47	L1
93	July 9	@ Padres	8–2	**Pfaadt** (9–6)	Cease (3–9)	—	43,066	46–47	W1
94	July 10	@ Padres	3–4	Morejón (7–3)	**Rodríguez** (3–6)	Suárez (27)	39,079	46–48	L1
95	July 11	@ Angels	5–6	Jansen (3–2)	**Backhus** (0–1)	—	35,209	46–49	L2
96	July 12	@ Angels	5–10	Kikuchi (4–6)	**Gallen** (7–10)	—	43,008	46–50	L3
97	July 13	@ Angels	5–1	**Kelly** (8–5)	Soriano (6–7)	—	28,773	47–50	W1
–	July 15	**95th All-Star Game in Cumberland, GA**							
98	July 18	Cardinals	7–3	**Pfaadt** (10–6)	Pallante (5–6)	—	31,938	48–50	W2
99	July 19	Cardinals	10–1	**R. Nelson** (6–2)	Gray (9–4)	—	42,817	49–50	W3
100	July 20	Cardinals	5–3	**Kelly** (9–5)	Mikolas (5–7)	**DeSclafani** (2)	31,288	50–50	W4
101	July 21	Astros	3–6	Gordon (4–2)	**Gallen** (7–11)	Hader (26)	20,144	50–51	L1
102	July 22	Astros	1–3	Valdez (11–4)	**Woodford** (0–1)	King (1)	25,650	50–52	L2
103	July 23	Astros	3–4	Sousa (4–0)	**Ginkel** (1–4)	Hader (27)	22,513	50–53	L3
104	July 25	@ Pirates	1–0 (11)	**DeSclafani** (1–1)	Ashcraft (2–1)	**Ginkel** (3)	21,296	51–53	W1
105	July 26	@ Pirates	0–2	Heaney (5–9)	**Kelly** (9–6)	Bednar (16)	27,425	51–54	L1
106	July 27	@ Pirates	0–6	Skenes (6–8)	**Gallen** (7–12)	—	20,779	51–55	L2
107	July 28	@ Tigers	1–5	Melton (1–1)	**Rodríguez** (3–7)	—	23,124	51–56	L3
108	July 29	@ Tigers	2–12	Hurter (3–3)	**Pfaadt** (10–7)	—	27,697	51–57	L4
109	July 30	@ Tigers	2–7	Paddack (4–9)	**R. Nelson** (6–3)	—	29,033	51–58	L5

August: 17–12 (Home: 8–4; Away: 9–8)

#	Date	Opponent	Score	Win	Loss	Save	Attendance	Record	Streak
110	August 1	@ Athletics	1–5	Lopez (4–6)	**DeSclafani** (1–2)	—	8,730	51–59	L6
111	August 2	@ Athletics	7–2	**Gallen** (8–12)	Ginn (2–3)	—	8,687	52–59	W1
112	August 3	@ Athletics	6–4	**Rodríguez** (4–7)	Perkins (0–2)	**K. Nelson** (1)	8,830	53–59	W2
113	August 4	Padres	6–2	**Pfaadt** (11–7)	Sears (7–10)	**Backhus** (1)	20,196	54–59	W3
114	August 5	Padres	5–10 (11)	Suárez (4–4)	**Woodford** (0–2)	—	20,903	54–60	L1
115	August 6	Padres	2–3	Morejón (9–4)	**Backhus** (0–2)	Miller (21)	22,692	54–61	L2
116	August 8	Rockies	6–1	**Gallen** (9–12)	Gomber (0–6)	—	29,941	55–61	W1
117	August 9	Rockies	6–5	**Hoffman** (1–0)	Herget (0–2)	—	38,337	56–61	W2
118	August 10	Rockies	13–6	**Pfaadt** (12–7)	Gordon (2–5)	—	24,611	57–61	W3
119	August 11	@ Rangers	6–7 (10)	Maton (2–3)	**Saalfrank** (0–1)	—	25,781	57–62	L1
120	August 12	@ Rangers	3–2	**Beeks** (3–1)	Coulombe (2–1)	**Morillo** (1)	18,268	58–62	W1
121	August 13	@ Rangers	6–4	**Curtiss** (2–0)	Maton (2–4)	**Saalfrank** (1)	26,021	59–62	W2
122	August 14	@ Rockies	8–2	**Rodríguez** (5–7)	Blalock (1–4)	—	23,045	60–62	W3
123	August 15	@ Rockies	3–4	Gordon (3–5)	**Pfaadt** (12–8)	Vodnik (5)	26,081	60–63	L1
124	August 16	@ Rockies	7–10	Rolison (1–0)	**Hoffmann** (1–1)	Vodnik (6)	27,929	60–64	L2
125	August 17	@ Rockies	5–6	Molina (1–1)	**Woodford** (0–3)	Mejía (1)	22,895	60–65	L3
126	August 18	Guardians	1–3	Williams (8–4)	**Gallen** (9–13)	Smith (7)	16,815	60–66	L4
127	August 19	Guardians	6–5	**Burgos** (1–0)	Herrin (4–3)	**Saalfrank** (2)	19,723	61–66	W1
128	August 20	Guardians	3–2 (10)	**Saalfrank** (1–1)	Festa (3–3)	—	16,848	62–66	W2
129	August 22	Reds	6–5 (11)	**Beeks** (4–1)	Barlow (6–2)	—	29,252	63–66	W3
130	August 23	Reds	10–1	**Crismatt** (1–0)	Abbott (8–4)	**Woodford** (1)	36,567	64–66	W4
131	August 24	Reds	1–6	Ashcraft (8–5)	**Backhus** (0–3)	—	25,496	64–67	L1
132	August 25	@ Brewers	5–7	Woodruff (5–1)	**Rodríguez** (5–8)	Uribe (3)	28,486	64–68	L2
133	August 26	@ Brewers	8–9	Miller (4–3)	**Morillo** (0–3)	—	32,850	64–69	L3
134	August 27	@ Brewers	3–2	**R. Nelson** (7–3)	Fedde (4–13)	**Saalfrank** (3)	26,176	65–69	W1
135	August 28	@ Brewers	6–4	**Crismatt** (2–0)	Quintana (10–5)	**Rashi** (1)	35,822	66–69	W2
136	August 29	@ Dodgers	3–0	**Gallen** (10–13)	Snell (3–3)	**Woodford** (2)	45,701	67–69	W3
137	August 30	@ Dodgers	6–1	**Rodríguez** (6–8)	Glasnow (1–3)	—	47,632	68–69	W4
138	August 31	@ Dodgers	4–5	Treinen (1–2)	**Curtiss** (2–1)	—	51,803	68–70	L1

September: 12–12 (Home: 9–6; Away: 3–6)

#	Date	Opponent	Score	Win	Loss	Save	Attendance	Record	Streak
139	September 1	Rangers	5–7 (10)	Martin (2–6)	**Burgos** (1–1)	Armstrong (6)	26,489	68–71	L2
140	September 2	Rangers	5–3	**Beeks** (5–1)	Milner (2–4)	**Rashi** (2)	22,046	69–71	W1
141	September 3	Rangers	2–0	**Gallen** (11–13)	Leiter (9–8)	**Woodford** (3)	14,921	70–71	W2
142	September 5	Red Sox	10–5	**Rodríguez** (7–8)	Tolle (0–1)	—	39,126	71–71	W3
143	September 6	Red Sox	5–1	**Pfaadt** (13–8)	Giolito (10–3)	—	35,679	72–71	W4
144	September 7	Red Sox	4–7	Whitlock (6–3)	**Rashi** (0–1)	Chapman (29)	31,346	72–72	L1
145	September 8	@ Giants	5–11	Webb (14–9)	**Garcia** (0–1)	—	26,699	72–73	L2
146	September 9	@ Giants	3–5	Ray (11–6)	**Gallen** (11–14)	Walker (15)	30,883	72–74	L3
147	September 10	@ Giants	5–3	**Rodríguez** (8–8)	Seymour (1–3)	—	33,810	73–74	W1
148	September 12	@ Twins	8–9	Sands (4–4)	**Woodford** (0–4)	—	18,177	73–75	L1
149	September 13	@ Twins	5–2 (10)	**Curtiss** (3–1)	Sands (4–5)	—	21,227	74–75	W1
150	September 14	@ Twins	6–4	**Crismatt** (3–0)	Ober (5–8)	**Backhus** (2)	18,376	75–75	W2
151	September 15	Giants	8–1	**Gallen** (12–14)	Gage (0–1)	—	21,251	76–75	W3
152	September 16	Giants	6–5	**Saalfrank** (2–1)	Walker (5–6)	—	28,431	77–75	W4
153	September 17	Giants	1–5 (11)	Peguero (3–0)	**Curtiss** (3–2)	—	19,513	77–76	L1
154	September 19	Phillies	2–8	Buehler (9–7)	**Beeks** (5–2)	—	36,981	77–77	L2
155	September 20	Phillies	4–3	**Gallen** (13–14)	Nola (4–10)	**Curtiss** (1)	35,498	78–77	W1
156	September 21	Phillies	9–2	**Rodríguez** (9–8)	Suárez (12–7)	—	37,105	79–77	W2
157	September 23	Dodgers	5–4	**Thompson** (3–2)	Scott (1–4)	—	42,882	80–77	W3
158	September 24	Dodgers	4–5 (11)	Treinen (2–7)	**Garcia** (0–2)	Wrobleski (2)	43,417	80–78	L1
159	September 25	Dodgers	0–8	Yamamoto (12–8)	**Beeks** (5–3)	—	34,952	80–79	L2
160	September 26	@ Padres	4–7	Darvish (5–5)	**Gallen** (13–15)	Miller (22)	44,547	80–80	L3
161	September 27	@ Padres	1–5	Matsui (3–1)	**Rodríguez** (9–9)	—	44,457	80–81	L4
162	September 28	@ Padres	4–12	Sears (9–11)	**Pfaadt** (13–9)	—	45,072	80–82	L5

=== Season summary ===
Opening Day starting lineup
No.	Player	Pos.
Batters
4	Ketel Marte	2B
7	Corbin Carroll	RF
12	Lourdes Gurriel Jr.	LF
22	Josh Naylor	1B
14	Gabriel Moreno	C
28	Eugenio Suárez	3B
15	Randal Grichuk	DH
31	Jake McCarthy	CF
2	Geraldo Perdomo	SS
Starting pitcher
23	Zac Gallen	

==== Uniform combination ====
Team	Home White	Away Gray	Black Alternate	Red Alternate	City Connect	Sources
Arizona Diamondbacks	36	30	51	26	18	

== Roster ==
2025 Arizona Diamondbacks
Roster
Pitchers: 50 Philip Abner; 43 Kyle Backhus; 68 Jalen Beeks; 34 Jeff Brigham; 52 Juan Burgos; 39 Corbin Burnes; 66 José Castillo; 61 Nabil Crismatt; 46 John Curtiss; 21 Anthony DeSclafani; 45 Yilber Díaz; 61 J. P. Feyereisen; 23 Zac Gallen; 55 Brandyn Garcia; 37 Kevin Ginkel; 49 Kendall Graveman; 47 Tommy Henry; 56 Andrew Hoffmann; 99 Drey Jameson; 40 Bryce Jarvis; 60 Casey Kelly; 29 Merrill Kelly; 35 Joe Mantiply; 63 Justin Martínez; 30 Scott McGough; 64 Cristian Mena; 18 Shelby Miller; 59 Christian Montes De Oca; 67 Juan Morillo; 24 Kyle Nelson; 19 Ryne Nelson; 32 Brandon Pfaadt; 66 Austin Pope; 33 A. J. Puk; 54 Taylor Rashi; 38 Trevor Richards; 57 Eduardo Rodriguez; 27 Andrew Saalfrank; 53 Tayler Scott; 81 Ryan Thompson; 41 Jake Woodford	Catchers: 25 Adrian Del Castillo; 35,66 Aramis Garcia; 11 José Herrera; 8 James McCann; 14 Gabriel Moreno; Infielders: 9 Blaze Alexander; 30 Tristin English; 8 Garrett Hampson; 65 Connor Kaiser; 10 Jordan Lawlar; 28 Tyler Locklear; 4 Ketel Marte; 22 Josh Naylor; 2 Geraldo Perdomo; 26 Pavin Smith; 28 Eugenio Suárez; 13 Tim Tawa; 6 Ildemaro Vargas	Outfielders: 1 Jorge Barrosa; 7 Corbin Carroll; 15 Randal Grichuk; 12 Lourdes Gurriel Jr.; 31 Jake McCarthy; 5 Alek Thomas	Manager: 17 Torey Lovullo; Coaches: 82 Jeff Banister (bench); 71 Tim Bogar (third base); 76 Wellington Cepeda (bullpen); 73 Travis Denker (assistant hitting); 72 Owen Dew (assistant pitching); 75 Damion Easley (assistant hitting); 77 Brian Kaplan (pitching); 88 Shaun Larkin (infield); 74 Joe Mather (hitting); 36 Dave McKay (first base); 83 Jose Queliz (bullpen catcher); 84 Jonathan Solano (bullpen catcher)

== Statistics ==
Note: Team leaders in each category are noted in bold.

- Indicates league leader

=== Batting ===
(Through 2025 Season)
Note: G = Games played; AB = At bats; R = Runs; H = Hits; 2B = Doubles; 3B = Triples; HR = Home runs; RBI = Runs batted in; SB = Stolen bases; BB = Walks; K = Strikeouts; AVG = Batting average; OBP = On-base percentage; SLG = Slugging percentage; TB = Total bases

Player	G	AB	R	H	2B	3B	HR	RBI	SB	BB	K	AVG	OBP	SLG	TB
Blaze Alexander	74	230	31	53	12	1	7	28	4	22	86	.230	.323	.383	88
Jorge Barrosa	33	71	8	10	3	0	1	7	0	2	22	.141	.169	.225	16
Corbin Carroll	143	564	**107**	146	32	**17***	31	84	**32**	67	**153**	.259	.343	**.541**	**305**
Adrian Del Castillo	44	120	9	29	6	0	4	14	0	8	47	.242	.290	.392	47
Tristin English	7	22	0	2	1	0	0	1	0	1	8	.091	.130	.136	3
Aramis Garcia	2	4	0	0	0	0	0	0	0	0	3	.000	.000	.000	0
Randal Grichuk	70	175	25	42	15	1	7	22	0	10	39	.240	.277	.457	80
Lourdes Gurriel Jr.	129	500	52	124	24	2	19	80	10	31	76	.248	.295	.418	209
Garrett Hampson	18	30	10	5	0	0	0	0	2	9	10	.167	.359	.167	5
José Herrera	57	166	21	31	6	0	2	17	0	23	48	.187	.285	.259	43
Connor Kaiser	11	18	1	2	1	0	0	2	0	1	5	.111	.158	.167	3
Jordan Lawlar	28	66	9	12	7	0	0	5	2	6	26	.182	.258	.288	19
Tyler Locklear	31	103	11	18	0	0	3	8	3	10	43	.175	.267	.262	47
Ketel Marte	126	480	87	136	28	0	28	72	4	64	83	.283	.376	.893	248
James McCann	41	123	18	32	6	0	5	17	0	8	33	.260	.324	.431	53
Jake McCarthy	67	206	18	42	7	5	4	20	6	10	40	.207	.247	.345	71
Gabriel Moreno	73	277	44	79	12	1	9	40	2	29	53	.285	.353	.433	120
Josh Naylor	93	349	49	102	19	1	11	59	11	37	49	.292	.360	.447	156
Ryne Nelson	9	1	1	1	0	0	0	1	0	0	0	1.000	1.000	1.000	1
Geraldo Perdormo	**161**	**597**	98	**173**	**33**	5	20	**100**	27	**94**	83	**.290**	**.389**	.462	276
Pavin Smith	87	244	36	63	17	1	8	28	2	41	92	.258	.362	.434	106
Eugenio Suárez	106	387	64	96	19	0	**36**	87	1	29	117	.258	.362	.434	223
Tim Tawa	74	199	29	40	8	0	7	18	8	20	64	.201	.274	.347	69
Alek Thomas	143	433	51	108	19	3	9	38	7	30	122	.249	.289	.380	160
Ildemaro Vargas	38	115	12	31	2	1	3	19	0	2	15	.270	.289	.383	44
**Team totals**	162	5480	791	1377	277	38	214	768	121	545	1316	.251	.325	.433	2372

=== Pitching ===
(through 2025 Season)
Note: W = Wins; L = Losses; ERA = Earned run average G = Games pitched; GS = Games started; SV = Saves; IP = Innings pitched; H = Hits allowed; R = Runs allowed; ER = Earned runs allowed; BB = Walks allowed; K = Strikeouts

Player	W	L	ERA	G	GS	SV	IP	H	R	ER	BB	K
Philip Abner	0	0	4.91	5	0	0	3.2	5	2	2	3	5
Kyle Backhus	0	3	4.62	28	0	2	25.1	28	14	13	8	22
Jalen Beeks	5	3	3.77	**61**	2	1	57.1	42	26	24	20	47
Jeff Brigham	0	0	8.10	4	0	0	3.1	7	3	3	1	3
Juan Burgos	1	1	8.10	9	0	0	6.2	10	7	6	6	6
Corbin Burnes	3	2	2.66	11	11	0	64.1	49	23	19	26	63
José Castillo	0	1	11.37	5	0	0	6.1	10	8	8	3	3
Nabil Crismatt	3	0	3.71	8	5	0	34.0	40	21	14	6	25
John Curtiss	3	2	3.93	30	0	1	36.2	29	19	16	5	24
Anthony DeSclafani	1	2	5.12	13	4	2	38.2	37	23	22	12	36
Yilber Díaz	0	0	9.00	1	0	0	3.0	4	3	3	3	1
J.P. Feyereisen	0	1	9.00	2	0	0	2.0	3	3	2	1	2
Zac Gallen	**13**	**15**	**4.83**	33	**33**	0	**192.0**	176	**109**	**103**	**66**	**175**
Brandyn Garcia	0	2	5.84	12	0	0	12.1	14	10	8	5	13
Kevin Ginkel	1	4	7.36	29	0	3	25.2	29	22	21	13	29
Kendall Graveman	1	0	7.13	19	0	0	17.2	23	14	14	12	9
Tommy Henry	0	0	4.05	2	0	0	6.2	6	3	3	1	8
José Herrera	0	0	4.50	2	0	0	2.0	4	1	1	0	0
Andrew Hoffmann	1	1	7.36	8	0	0	7.1	7	6	6	6	7
Drey Jameson	0	1	3.00	3	0	1	3.0	4	2	1	3	0
Bryce Jarvis	0	0	5.73	12	0	1	22	23	14	14	10	21
Casey Kelly	0	0	0.00	2	0	0	1.0	1	0	0	2	0
Merrill Kelly	9	6	3.22	22	22	0	128.2	95	43	46	38	121
Joe Mantiply	0	1	15.83	10	0	0	9.2	26	17	17	3	8
Justin Martínez	1	2	4.11	17	0	5	15.1	7	8	7	12	22
Scott McGough	0	0	6.43	7	0	0	7.0	6	5	5	6	5
Cristian Mena	1	0	1.35	3	0	0	6.2	3	1	1	3	7
Shelby Miller	3	3	1.98	37	0	**10**	36.1	24	11	8	11	40
Christian Montes De Oca	0	0	0.00	1	0	0	2.2	0	0	0	1	2
Juan Morillo	0	3	4.19	42	0	1	34.1	38	19	16	20	36
Kyle Nelson	0	0	9.00	3	0	1	2.0	1	2	2	4	2
Ryne Nelson	7	3	3.39	33	23	1	154.0	124	62	58	41	132
Brandon Pfaadt	**13**	9	5.25	33	**33**	0	176.2	**198**	107	**103**	37	147
Austin Pope	0	0	0.00	1	0	0	2.0	2	0	0	1	1
A.J. Puk	0	0	3.38	8	0	5	8.0	8	3	3	2	12
Taylor Rashi	0	1	4.41	10	0	2	16.1	16	8	8	8	22
Trevor Richards	0	0	3.38	2	0	0	2.2	4	1	1	0	3
Eduardo Rodriguez	9	9	5.02	29	29	0	154.1	178	94	86	60	143
Andrew Saalfrank	2	1	1.24	28	0	3	29.0	19	5	4	10	19
Tayler Scott	0	0	9.00	6	0	0	9.0	13	9	9	4	7
Ryan Thompson	3	2	3.92	48	0	1	41.1	42	21	18	13	36
Jake Woodford	0	4	6.44	22	0	3	36.1	45	28	26	13	23
**Team totals**	80	82	4.49	162	162	42	1440.0	1403	785	721	500	1288

== Minor league affiliations ==
Level	Team	League	Location	Manager	Wins	Losses	Position
Triple-A	Reno Aces	Pacific Coast League	Reno, Nevada	Jeff Gardner	63	87	5th
Double-A	Amarillo Sod Poodles	Texas League	Amarillo, Texas	Javier Colina	71	67	2nd Lost in playoffs.
High-A	Hillsboro Hops	Northwest League	Hillsboro, Oregon	Mark Reed	60	70	4th
Low-A	Visalia Rawhide	California League	Visalia, California	Darrin Garner	65	67	2nd
Rookie	ACL D-backs	Arizona Complex League	Scottsdale, Arizona	Juan Francia	31	29	3rd
Rookie	DSL D-backs Black	Dominican Summer League	Boca Chica, Santo Domingo	Izzy Alcántara	24	32	5th
Rookie	DSL D-backs Red	Dominican Summer League	Boca Chica, Santo Domingo	Vladimir Frias	34	22	2nd
