= 2025 Atlanta Braves season =

2025 Atlanta Braves
- League: National League
- Division: East
- Ballpark: Truist Park
- City: Atlanta
- Record: 76–86 (.469)
- Divisional place: 4th
- General manager: Alex Anthopoulos
- Manager: Brian Snitker
- Television: FanDuel Sports Network Southeast; FanDuel Sports Network South; WPCH network (Gray stations in 25 markets) (Brandon Gaudin, C. J. Nitkowski, Jeff Francoeur, Tom Glavine, Nick Green, Kris Medlen, Peter Moylan, Gordon Beckham, Collin McHugh, Ashley ShahAhmadi, Hanna Yates, Wiley Ballard)
- Radio: 680 The Fan; Atlanta Braves Radio Network (Ben Ingram, Kevin McAlpin, Tom Hart, Joe Simpson, Darren O'Day, Kelly Johnson, Chris Dimino, Wiley Ballard); 1600 La Mejor (Daniel Cantú, Emanuel Zamarrón)

The 2025 Atlanta Braves season was the 155th season of the Atlanta Braves franchise, the 60th in Atlanta, and the Braves' ninth season at Truist Park. The Braves were managed by Brian Snitker, in his tenth and final season as the team's manager.

The Braves entered the season as favorites to win the National League East, but started 0–7, their worst start since 2016, after they were swept by the San Diego Padres and the Los Angeles Dodgers to begin the season. On May 16, the Braves went above .500 for the first time this season, becoming the fastest team since the 1945 Boston Red Sox to start the season 0–7 and get above .500. The Braves, however, went on a skid and were never able to get back above .500 for the rest of the season. As a result, they failed to improve on their 89–73 record from 2024.

On September 12, the Braves lost to the Astros to guarantee their first losing season since the 2017 season. On September 19, the Braves were eliminated from playoff contention for the first time since 2017.

On September 28, the Braves used veteran pitcher Charlie Morton out of the bullpen, becoming the 71st player to appear for the team during the 2025 season. This set a new Major League Baseball record for most players used by a single team in a season, surpassing the previous record of 70 set by the 2024 Miami Marlins. The 2025 Baltimore Orioles also matched that prior record earlier in the season, using 70 players. The mark would later be tied by the 2026 San Francisco Giants. The Braves also tied the record for most pitchers used in a season, with Morton becoming their 46th pitcher, matching a record set by the 2025 New York Mets on September 17.

The Braves finished the season with a record of 76–86, for 4th place in the NL East.

The Atlanta Braves drew an average home attendance of 35,841, the 8th-highest of all MLB teams.

== Offseason ==
The Braves finished the 2024 season with a record of 89–73, earning a spot in the playoffs as a Wild Card team. The team lost in the first round of the playoffs to the San Diego Padres.

=== Transactions ===
==== October/November 2024 ====
October 31	INF/OF Whit Merrifield, LHP Max Fried, RHP John Brebbia, RHP Jesse Chavez, LHP A. J. Minter, OF Adam Duvall, INF Gio Urshela and RHP Charlie Morton elected free agency
October 31	Los Angeles Angels traded RHP Griffin Canning to Atlanta Braves for DH/OF Jorge Soler
November 1	INF Cavan Biggio, RHP Luke Jackson, catcher Travis d'Arnaud elected free agency
November 29	Braves signed right-handed pitcher Connor Gillispie to a 1-year contract.

==== December 2024 ====
December 16	Braves signed outfielder Bryan De La Cruz to a 1-year contract.

==== January 2025 ====
January 23	Braves signed outfielder Jurickson Profar to a 3-year contract.

==== March 2025 ====
March 31	Braves traded for Cincinnati Reds outfield Stuart Fairchild for cash considerations.
March 31	Atlanta Braves placed outfielder Jurickson Profar on the restricted list for failing Major League Baseball drug policy.

== Season standings ==
=== National League East ===
NL East
Team	W	L	Pct.	GB	Home	Road
Philadelphia Phillies	96	66	.593	—	55‍–‍26	41‍–‍40
New York Mets	83	79	.512	13	49‍–‍32	34‍–‍47
Miami Marlins	79	83	.488	17	38‍–‍43	41‍–‍40
Atlanta Braves	76	86	.469	20	39‍–‍42	37‍–‍44
Washington Nationals	66	96	.407	30	32‍–‍49	34‍–‍47

=== National League Wild Card ===
Division leaders
Team	W	L	Pct.
Milwaukee Brewers	97	65	.599
Philadelphia Phillies	96	66	.593
Los Angeles Dodgers	93	69	.574

Wild Card teams (Top 3 teams qualify for postseason)
Team	W	L	Pct.	GB
Chicago Cubs	92	70	.568	+9
San Diego Padres	90	72	.556	+7
Cincinnati Reds	83	79	.512	—
New York Mets	83	79	.512	—
San Francisco Giants	81	81	.500	2
Arizona Diamondbacks	80	82	.494	3
Miami Marlins	79	83	.488	4
St. Louis Cardinals	78	84	.481	5
Atlanta Braves	76	86	.469	7
Pittsburgh Pirates	71	91	.438	12
Washington Nationals	66	96	.407	17
Colorado Rockies	43	119	.265	40

=== Record vs. opponents ===
==== Record vs. National League ====
2025 National League record Source: MLB Standings Grid – 2025
Team	AZ	ATL	CHC	CIN	COL	LAD	MIA	MIL	NYM	PHI	PIT	SD	SF	STL	WSH	AL
Arizona	—	4–2	3–4	2–4	8–5	6–7	3–3	4–3	3–3	3–3	2–4	5–8	7–6	3–3	2–4	25–23
Atlanta	2–4	—	2–4	5–2	4–2	1–5	8–5	2–4	8–5	5–8	2–4	1–6	1–5	4–2	9–4	22–26
Chicago	4–3	4–2	—	5–8	5–1	4–3	4–2	7–6	2–4	2–4	10–3	3–3	1–5	8–5	3–3	30–18
Cincinnati	4–2	2–5	8–5	—	5–1	1–5	3–4	5–8	4–2	3–3	7–6	4–2	3–3	6–7	2–4	26–22
Colorado	5–8	2–4	1–5	1–5	—	2–11	3–3	2–4	0–6	0–7	2–4	3–10	2–11	4–2	4–3	12–36
Los Angeles	7–6	5–1	3–4	5–1	11–2	—	5–1	0–6	3–4	2–4	2–4	9–4	9–4	2–4	3–3	27–21
Miami	3–3	5–8	2–4	4–3	3–3	1–5	—	3–3	7–6	4–9	4–3	3–3	4–2	3–3	7–6	26–22
Milwaukee	3–4	4–2	6–7	8–5	4–2	6–0	3–3	—	4–2	4–2	10–3	2–4	2–5	7–6	6–0	28–20
New York	3–3	5–8	4–2	2–4	6–0	4–3	6–7	2–4	—	7–6	2–4	2–4	4–2	5–2	7–6	24–24
Philadelphia	3–3	8–5	4–2	3–3	7–0	4–2	9–4	2–4	6–7	—	3–3	3–3	3–4	2–4	8–5	31–17
Pittsburgh	4–2	4–2	3–10	6–7	4–2	4–2	3–4	3–10	4–2	3–3	—	1–5	4–2	7–6	4–3	17–31
San Diego	8–5	6–1	3–3	2–4	10–3	4–9	3–3	4–2	4–2	3–3	5–1	—	10–3	4–3	4–2	20–28
San Francisco	6–7	5–1	5–1	3–3	11–2	4–9	2–4	5–2	2–4	4–3	2–4	3–10	—	2–4	3–3	24–24
St. Louis	3–3	2–4	5–8	7–6	2–4	4–2	3–3	6–7	2–5	4–2	6–7	3–4	4–2	—	5–1	22–26
Washington	4–2	4–9	3–3	4–2	3–4	3–3	6–7	0–6	6–7	5–8	3–4	2–4	3–3	1–5	—	19–29

Updated with the results of all games through September 28, 2025.

==== Record vs. American League ====
2025 National League record vs. American League Source: MLB Standings
Team	ATH	BAL	BOS	CWS	CLE	DET	HOU	KC	LAA	MIN	NYY	SEA	TB	TEX	TOR
Arizona	2–1	2–1	2–1	2–1	2–1	0–3	0–3	1–2	1–2	2–1	2–1	3–0	1–2	4–2	1–2
Atlanta	1–2	0–3	3–3	2–1	3–0	3–0	1–2	1–2	1–2	3–0	1–2	1–2	1–2	0–3	1–2
Chicago	3–0	2–1	2–1	5–1	3–0	1–2	1–2	1–2	3–0	1–2	2–1	1–2	2–1	2–1	1–2
Cincinnati	0–3	2–1	1–2	1–2	5–1	2–1	1–2	2–1	2–1	2–1	2–1	1–2	3–0	1–2	1–2
Colorado	1–2	1–2	0–3	1–2	1–2	0–3	2–4	0–3	2–1	2–1	1–2	0–3	1–2	0–3	0–3
Los Angeles	2–1	1–2	1–2	3–0	2–1	3–0	0–3	2–1	0–6	2–1	2–1	3–0	2–1	2–1	2–1
Miami	1–2	2–1	1–2	1–2	1–2	2–1	1–2	2–1	2–1	2–1	3–0	1–2	3–3	3–0	1–2
Milwaukee	2–1	2–1	3–0	2–1	1–2	2–1	2–1	2–1	3–0	4–2	0–3	2–1	1–2	0–3	2–1
New York	2–1	1–2	1–2	2–1	0–3	2–1	1–2	2–1	3–0	1–2	3–3	2–1	0–3	1–2	3–0
Philadelphia	2–1	2–1	2–1	1–2	2–1	2–1	0–3	2–1	1–2	2–1	2–1	3–0	3–0	3–0	4–2
Pittsburgh	2–1	0–3	2–1	0–3	0–3	4–2	1–2	0–3	2–1	1–2	1–2	0–3	1–2	1–2	2–1
San Diego	2–1	0–3	2–1	2–1	3–0	1–2	1–2	2–1	2–1	1–2	1–2	1–5	0–3	2–1	0–3
San Francisco	5–1	2–1	2–1	1–2	1–2	0–3	3–0	1–2	1–2	0–3	2–1	3–0	1–2	2–1	0–3
St. Louis	2–1	2–1	0–3	3–0	3–0	1–2	2–1	3–3	1–2	3–0	0–3	0–3	1–2	1–2	0–3
Washington	1–2	5–1	0–3	1–2	1–2	2–1	1–2	1–2	2–1	2–1	0–3	2–1	0–3	1–2	0–3

Updated with the results of all games through September 28, 2025.

== Game log ==
Legend
	Braves win
	Braves loss
	Postponement
	Eliminated from playoff contention
**Bold**	Braves team member

2025 Game Log: 76–86 (Home: 39–42; Away: 37–44)
March/April: 14–16 (Home: 8–3; Away: 6–13)

#	Date	Opponent	Score	Win	Loss	Save	Attendance	Record	Streak
1	March 27	@ Padres	4–7	Peralta (1–0)	**Neris** (0–1)	Suárez (1)	45,568	0–1	L1
2	March 28	@ Padres	3–4	Adam (1–0)	**Lee** (0–1)	Suárez (2)	41,058	0–2	L2
3	March 29	@ Padres	0–1	Peralta (2–0)	**Bummer** (0–1)	Morejón (1)	40,587	0–3	L3
4	March 30	@ Padres	0–5	Pivetta (1–0)	**Smith-Shawver** (0–1)	—	41,269	0–4	L4
5	March 31	@ Dodgers	1–6	Glasnow (1–0)	**Holmes** (0–1)	—	50,816	0–5	L5
6	April 1	@ Dodgers	1–3	Banda (2–0)	**Sale** (0–1)	Scott (2)	50,182	0–6	L6
7	April 2	@ Dodgers	5–6	Dreyer (1–0)	**Iglesias** (0–1)	—	50,281	0–7	L7
8	April 4	Marlins	10–0	**Schwellenbach** (1–0)	Meyer (0–1)	—	41,583	1–7	W1
9	April 5	Marlins	0–4	Quantrill (1–1)	**Smith-Shawver** (0–2)	—	39,732	1–8	L1
―	April 6	Marlins	Postponed (rain); Makeup: August 9						
10	April 8	Phillies	7–5	**Hernández** (1–0)	Kerkering (1–1)	**Iglesias** (1)	33,508	2–8	W1
11	April 9	Phillies	3–4	Alvarado (2–0)	**Iglesias** (0–2)	—	35,323	2–9	L1
12	April 10	Phillies	4–2 (11)	**Suárez** (1–0)	Ross (1–1)	—	36,630	3–9	W1
13	April 11	@ Rays	3–6	Bradley (2–0)	**Elder** (0–1)	Fairbanks (3)	10,046	3–10	L1
14	April 12	@ Rays	5–4	**Lee** (1–1)	Sulser (0–1)	**Iglesias** (2)	10,046	4–10	W1
15	April 13	@ Rays	3–8	Boyle (1–0)	**Sale** (0–2)	—	10,046	4–11	L1
16	April 14	@ Blue Jays	8–4	**Holmes** (1–1)	Lucas (2–1)	—	21,595	5–11	W1
17	April 15	@ Blue Jays	3–6	Gausman (2–1)	**Schwellenbach** (1–1)	—	26,979	5–12	L1
18	April 16	@ Blue Jays	1–3	Bassitt (2–0)	**Strider** (0–1)	Hoffman (4)	25,328	5–13	L2
19	April 18	Twins	6–4	**De Los Santos** (1–0)	Jax (0–2)	**Iglesias** (3)	39,142	6–13	W1
20	April 19	Twins	4–3	**Johnson** (1–0)	Woods Richardson (1–1)	**Iglesias** (4)	39,278	7–13	W2
21	April 20	Twins	6–2	**Holmes** (2–1)	Ryan (1–2)	—	31,889	8–13	W3
22	April 21	Cardinals	7–6	**Hernández** (2–0)	Maton (0–1)	—	30,180	9–13	W4
23	April 22	Cardinals	4–10	Matz (2–0)	**De Los Santos** (1–1)	—	35,876	9–14	L1
24	April 23	Cardinals	4–1	**Hernández** (3–0)	Romero (1–3)	—	34,009	10–14	W1
25	April 25	@ Diamondbacks	8–2	**Sale** (1–2)	Gallen (1–4)	—	31,023	11–14	W2
26	April 26	@ Diamondbacks	8–7	**Iglesias** (1–2)	Martínez (1–1)	**Lee** (1)	43,043	12–14	W3
27	April 27	@ Diamondbacks	4–6	Pfaadt (5–1)	**Schwellenbach** (1–2)	Martínez (3)	33,544	12–15	L1
28	April 28	@ Rockies	6–3	**Elder** (1–1)	Feltner (0–2)	**Iglesias** (5)	18,852	13–15	W1
29	April 29	@ Rockies	8–2	**Smith-Shawver** (1–2)	Márquez (0–5)	—	19,010	14–15	W2
30	April 30	@ Rockies	1–2	Dollander (2–3)	**Sale** (1–3)	Agnos (1)	29,661	14–16	L1

May: 13–14 (Home: 9–7; Away: 4–7)

#	Date	Opponent	Score	Win	Loss	Save	Attendance	Record	Streak
31	May 2	Dodgers	1–2	Yamamoto (4–2)	**Holmes** (2–2)	Phillips (1)	41,201	14–17	L2
32	May 3	Dodgers	3–10	Sasaki (1–1)	**Schwellenbach** (1–3)	—	42,159	14–18	L3
33	May 4	Dodgers	4–3	**Elder** (2–1)	May (1–2)	**Iglesias** (6)	39,649	15–18	W1
34	May 5	Reds	4–0	**Smith-Shawver** (2–2)	Singer (4–2)	—	30,175	16–18	W2
35	May 6	Reds	2–1 (10)	**Iglesias** (2–2)	Richardson (0–1)	—	32,835	17–18	W3
36	May 7	Reds	3–4	Suter (1–0)	**Holmes** (2–3)	Pagán (9)	32,761	17–19	L1
37	May 8	Reds	5–4 (11)	**Blewett** (1–0)	Rogers (1–1)	—	33,794	18–19	W1
38	May 9	@ Pirates	2–3	Falter (2–3)	**Elder** (2–2)	Santana (4)	19,357	18–20	L1
39	May 10	@ Pirates	3–2 (11)	**Blewett** (2–0)	Shugart (1–3)	―	27,767	19–20	W1
40	May 11	@ Pirates	3–4	Santana (1–1)	**Iglesias** (2–3)	—	17,845	19–21	L1
41	May 12	Nationals	4–3	**Iglesias** (3–3)	Rutledge (0–1)	—	32,696	20–21	W1
42	May 13	Nationals	5–2	**Schwellenbach** (2–3)	Lord (1–5)	**Johnson** (1)	32,725	21–21	W2
43	May 14	Nationals	4–5	Ferrer (1–2)	**De Los Santos** (1–2)	Finnegan (13)	37,134	21–22	L1
44	May 15	Nationals	5–2	**Shawver** (3–2)	Williams (2–5)	**Iglesias** (7)	34,074	22–22	W1
45	May 16	@ Red Sox	4–2	**Sale** (2–3)	Crochet (4–3)	**Iglesias** (8)	34,648	23–22	W2
46	May 17	@ Red Sox	6–7	Chapman (3–2)	**Johnson** (1–1)	—	34,594	23–23	L1
47	May 18	@ Red Sox	10–4	**Schwellenbach** (3–3)	Bello (2–1)	—	35,012	24–23	W1
48	May 20	@ Nationals	3–5	Parker (4–3)	**Strider** (0–2)	Finnegan (15)	26,517	24–24	L1
―	May 21	@ Nationals	Postponed (rain); Makeup: September 16						
49	May 22	@ Nationals	7–8 (10)	Rutledge (1–1)	**Lee** (1–2)	—	16,907	24–25	L2
50	May 23	Padres	1–3	Adam (5–0)	**Iglesias** (3–4)	Suárez (16)	40,327	24–26	L3
51	May 24	Padres	7–1	**Holmes** (3–3)	Reynolds (0–1)	—	41,338	25–26	W1
52	May 25	Padres	3–5	Estrada (2–3)	**Schwellenbach** (3–4)	Suárez (17)	41,251	25–27	L1
53	May 27	@ Phillies	0–2	Suárez (4–0)	**Strider** (0–3)	Romano (7)	40,627	25–28	L2
―	May 28	@ Phillies	Postponed (rain); Makeup: May 29						
54	May 29 (1)	@ Phillies	4–5	Ruiz (1–0)	**Hernández** (3–1)	Romano (8)	32,314	25–29	L3
55	May 29 (2)	@ Phillies	9–3	**Sale** (3–3)	Wheeler (6–2)	—	42,739	26–29	W1
56	May 30	Red Sox	1–5	Whitlock (4–0)	**Holmes** (3–4)	—	39,842	26–30	L1
57	May 31	Red Sox	5–0	**Schwellenbach** (4–4)	Buehler (4–3)	—	41,444	27–30	W1

June: 11–15 (Home: 6–7; Away: 5–8)

#	Date	Opponent	Score	Win	Loss	Save	Attendance	Record	Streak
58	June 1	Red Sox	1–3	Crochet (5–4)	**Elder** (2–3)	Chapman (9)	38,279	27–31	L1
59	June 3	Diamondbacks	3–8	Gallen (4–7)	**Strider** (0–4)	—	32,898	27–32	L2
60	June 4	Diamondbacks	1–2	Kelly (6–2)	**Sale** (3–4)	Martínez (5)	37,082	27–33	L3
61	June 5	Diamondbacks	10–11	Graveman (1–0)	**Iglesias** (3–5)	Miller (6)	33,902	27–34	L4
62	June 6	@ Giants	4–5 (10)	Bivens (2–2)	**Johnson** (1–2)	—	39,153	27–35	L5
63	June 7	@ Giants	2–3	Rogers (3–2)	**Johnson** (1–3)	—	35,162	27–36	L6
64	June 8	@ Giants	2–4	Roupp (4–4)	**Strider** (0–5)	Doval (9)	41,026	27–37	L7
65	June 9	@ Brewers	7–1	**Sale** (4–4)	Civale (1–2)	—	25,145	28–37	W1
66	June 10	@ Brewers	1–4	Priester (4–2)	**Holmes** (3–4)	Megill (13)	30,028	28–38	L1
67	June 11	@ Brewers	6–2	**Schwellenbach** (5–4)	Patrick (3–6)	—	30,809	29–38	W1
68	June 13	Rockies	12–4	**De Los Santos** (2–2)	Vodnik (1–2)	—	39,303	30–38	W2
69	June 14	Rockies	4–1	**Strider** (1–5)	Dollander (2–7)	—	38,515	31–38	W3
70	June 15	Rockies	1–10	Bird (2–1)	**Holmes** (3–6)	—	39,405	31–39	L1
71	June 17	Mets	5–4 (10)	**Iglesias** (4–5)	Brazobán (3–2)	—	36,791	32–39	W1
72	June 18	Mets	5–0	**Sale** (5–4)	Blackburn (0–1)	—	39,926	33–39	W2
73	June 19	Mets	7–1	**Strider** (2–5)	Holmes (7–4)	—	39,234	34–39	W3
74	June 20	@ Marlins	2–6	Junk (2–0)	**Fuentes** (0–1)	—	12,146	34–40	L1
75	June 21	@ Marlins	7–0	**Holmes** (4–6)	Pérez (0–2)	—	21,198	35–40	W1
76	June 22	@ Marlins	3–5	Alcántara (4–8)	**Elder** (2–4)	Henríquez (2)	16,486	35–41	L1
77	June 23	@ Mets	3–2	**Schwellenbach** (6–4)	Blackburn (0–2)	**Lee** (2)	38,593	36–41	W1
78	June 24	@ Mets	7–4	**Strider** (3–5)	Castillo (0–2)	**Iglesias** (9)	38,130	37–41	W2
79	June 25	@ Mets	3–7	Holmes (8–4)	**Fuentes** (0–2)	Díaz (16)	38,275	37–42	L1
80	June 26	@ Mets	0–4	Warren (1–0)	**Holmes** (4–7)	—	42,646	37–43	L2
81	June 27	Phillies	0–13	Walker (3–5)	**Elder** (2–5)	Rangel (1)	40,753	37–44	L3
82	June 28	Phillies	6–1	**Schwellenbach** (7–4)	Luzardo (7–4)	—	41,751	38–44	W1
83	June 29	Phillies	1–2	Suárez (7–2)	**Strider** (3–6)	Strahm (5)	35,792	38–45	L1

July: 8–17 (Home: 3–9; Away: 5–8)

#	Date	Opponent	Score	Win	Loss	Save	Attendance	Record	Streak
84	July 1	Angels	0–4	Fermín (1–0)	**Lee** (1–3)	—	31,657	38–46	L2
85	July 2	Angels	8–3	**Bummer** (1–1)	Zeferjahn (5–2)	—	31,519	39–46	W1
86	July 3	Angels	1–5	Soriano (6–5)	**Elder** (2–6)	—	34,702	39–47	L1
87	July 4	Orioles	2–3	Morton (5–7)	**Strider** (3–7)	Bautista (17)	40,249	39–48	L2
88	July 5	Orioles	6–9 (10)	Bautista (1–1)	**Montero** (0–1)	Canó (1)	37,170	39–49	L3
89	July 6	Orioles	1–2	Rogers (2–0)	**Holmes** (4–8)	Domínguez (2)	34,012	39–50	L4
90	July 8	@ Athletics	1–10	Springs (7–6)	**Fuentes** (0–3)	—	8,620	39–51	L5
91	July 9	@ Athletics	9–2	**Elder** (3–6)	Spence (2–5)	—	9,273	40–51	W1
92	July 10	@ Athletics	4–5 (11)	Sterner (2–3)	**Bummer** (1–2)	—	10,258	40–52	L1
93	July 11	@ Cardinals	6–5	**De Los Santos** (3–2)	Liberatore (6–7)	**Iglesias** (10)	29,625	41–52	W1
94	July 12	@ Cardinals	7–6	**Hernández** (4–1)	Helsley (3–1)	**Iglesias** (11)	31,807	42–52	W2
95	July 13	@ Cardinals	4–5	Graceffo (3–0)	**Chavez** (0–1)	Helsley (19)	26,959	42–53	L1
–	July 15	**95th All-Star Game: Cumberland, GA**							
96	July 18	Yankees	7–3	**Strider** (4–7)	Hamilton (1–1)	—	41,844	43–53	W1
97	July 19	Yankees	9–12	Weaver (2–3)	**Iglesias** (4–6)	—	42,530	43–54	L1
98	July 20	Yankees	2–4	Stroman (2–1)	**Holmes** (4–9)	Williams (14)	40,125	43–55	L2
99	July 21	Giants	9–5	**Elder** (4–6)	Birdsong (4–4)	—	34,857	44–55	W1
100	July 22	Giants	0–9	Roupp (7–6)	**Daniel** (0–1)	—	36,433	44–56	L1
101	July 23	Giants	3–9	Verlander (1–8)	**Strider** (4–8)	—	33,352	44–57	L2
102	July 25	@ Rangers	3–8	Eovaldi (8–3)	**Wentz** (2–2)	—	34,643	44–58	L3
103	July 26	@ Rangers	5–6 (10)	Armstrong (4–3)	**De Los Santos** (3–3)	—	38,318	44–59	L4
104	July 27	@ Rangers	1–8	Leiter (7–6)	**Elder** (4–7)	—	35,914	44–60	L5
105	July 28	@ Royals	10–7	**Strider** (5–8)	Hill (0–2)	**Iglesias** (12)	23,850	45–60	W1
106	July 29	@ Royals	6–9	Lugo (8–5)	**Fedde** (3–11)	Estévez (28)	22,562	45–61	L1
107	July 30	@ Royals	0–1 (10)	Long (1–2)	**Hernández** (4–2)	—	17,726	45–62	L2
108	July 31	@ Reds	12–11 (10)	**Johnson** (2–3)	Pagán (2–4)	**Iglesias** (13)	27,169	46–62	W1

August: 16–13 (Home: 7–7; Away: 9–6)

#	Date	Opponent	Score	Win	Loss	Save	Attendance	Record	Streak
109	August 1	@ Reds	2–3	Singer (9–8)	**Elder** (4–8)	Pagán (23)	29,269	46–63	L1
110	August 2* (Note: The August 2 game was suspended due to rain in the bottom of the first inning with the Reds leading 1–0; it was completed on August 3, which was originally a scheduled off-day for both the Braves and Reds.)	@ Reds	4–2	**Waldrep** (1–0)	Suter (1–2)	**Iglesias** (14)	91,032	47–63	W1
111	August 4	Brewers	1–3	Priester (11–2)	**Fedde** (3–12)	Megill (25)	30,790	47–64	L1
112	August 5	Brewers	2–7	Peralta (13–5)	**Wentz** (2–3)	—	30,642	47–65	L2
113	August 6	Brewers	4–5	Quintana (9–4)	**Strider** (5–9)	Megill (26)	30,964	47–66	L3
114	August 7	Marlins	8–6	**Johnson** (3–3)	Simpson (2–1)	**Iglesias** (15)	32,460	48–66	W1
115	August 8	Marlins	1–5	Cabrera (6–5)	**Elder** (4–9)	—	32,717	48–67	L1
116	August 9 (1)	Marlins	7–1	**Waldrep** (2–0)	Gusto (7–5)	―	35,664	49–67	W1
117	August 9 (2)	Marlins	8–6	**Fedde** (4–12)	Alcántara (6–11)	**Iglesias** (16)	35,433	50–67	W2
118	August 10	Marlins	7–1	**Wentz** (3–3)	Phillips (1–1)	—	31,203	51–67	W3
119	August 12	@ Mets	5–13	Soto (1–3)	**Strider** (5–10)	Hagenman (1)	39,748	51–68	L1
120	August 13	@ Mets	11–6	**Bummer** (2–2)	Garrett (3–5)	—	38,647	52–68	W1
121	August 14	@ Mets	4–3	**Elder** (5–9)	Helsley (3–3)	**Iglesias** (17)	41,782	53–68	W2
122	August 15	@ Guardians	2–0	**Waldrep** (3–0)	Cantillo (3–3)	**Iglesias** (18)	33,571	54–68	W3
123	August 16	@ Guardians	10–1	**Wentz** (4–3)	Cecconi (5–6)	**Stratton** (1)	34,059	55–68	W4
124	August 17	@ Guardians	5–4	**Bummer** (3–2)	Enright (2–1)	**Iglesias** (19)	28,899	56–68	W5
125	August 18	White Sox	9–13	Gómez (3–1)	**Strider** (5–11)	—	27,868	56–69	L1
126	August 19	White Sox	11–10	**Lee** (2–3)	Alexander (4–11)	**Iglesias** (20)	29,134	57–69	W1
127	August 20	White Sox	1–0	**Waldrep** (4–0)	Pérez (1–3)	**Iglesias** (21)	30,054	58–69	W2
128	August 22	Mets	7–12	McLean (2–0)	**Wentz** (4–4)	—	40,076	58–70	L1
129	August 23	Mets	2–9	Holmes (11–6)	**Quantrill** (4–11)	—	39,738	58–71	L2
130	August 24	Mets	4–3	**Kinley** (2–3)	Soto (1–4)	**Iglesias** (22)	34,393	59–71	W1
131	August 25	@ Marlins	1–2	Cabrera (7–7)	**Strider** (5–12)	Faucher (12)	8,111	59–72	L1
132	August 26	@ Marlins	11–2	**Kinley** (3–3)	Zuber (0–1)	—	8,576	60–72	W1
133	August 27	@ Marlins	12–1	**Wentz** (5–4)	Gusto (7–7)	—	12,453	61–72	W2
134	August 28	@ Phillies	4–19	Nola (3–7)	**Quantrill** (4–12)	—	41,293	61–73	L1
135	August 29	@ Phillies	1–2	Kerkering (7–4)	**Lee** (2–4)	Durán (24)	40,322	61–74	L2
136	August 30	@ Phillies	2–3 (10)	Strahm (2–3)	**Stratton** (0–1)	—	43,462	61–75	L3
137	August 31	@ Phillies	3–1	**Kinley** (4–3)	Alvarado (4–2)	**Iglesias** (23)	43,770	62–75	W1
*August 2 game played at Bristol Motor Speedway in Bristol, Tennessee

September: 14–11 (Home: 6–9; Away: 8–2)

#	Date	Opponent	Score	Win	Loss	Save	Attendance	Record	Streak
138	September 1	@ Cubs	6–7 (10)	Kittredge (4–3)	**Brebbia** (1–1)	—	39,673	62–76	L1
139	September 2	@ Cubs	3–4	Imanaga (9–6)	**Wentz** (5–5)	Palencia (22)	32,618	62–77	L2
140	September 3	@ Cubs	5–1	**Elder** (6–9)	Brown (5–8)	—	31,933	63–77	W1
141	September 5	Mariners	4–1	**Kinley** (5–3)	Speier (2–3)	**Iglesias** (24)	36,203	64–77	W2
142	September 6	Mariners	2–10	Speier (3–3)	**Hernández** (4–3)	—	35,700	64–78	L1
143	September 7	Mariners	2–18	Castillo (9–8)	**Wentz** (5–6)	—	31,119	64–79	L2
144	September 8	Cubs	4–1	**Elder** (7–9)	Imanaga (9–7)	**Iglesias** (25)	33,430	65–79	W1
145	September 9	Cubs	1–6	Horton (10–4)	**Strider** (5–13)	—	32,721	65–80	L1
146	September 10	Cubs	2–3	Rogers (3–2)	**Sale** (5–5)	Kittredge (3)	35,757	65–81	L2
147	September 12	Astros	3–11	Blubaugh (3–1)	**Waldrep** (4–1)	Gordon (1)	34,030	65–82	L3
148	September 13	Astros	2–6	Brown (12–7)	**Elder** (7–10)	—	36,826	65–83	L4
149	September 14	Astros	8–3	**Stratton** (1–1)	Valdez (12–10)	—	32,807	66–83	W1
150	September 15	@ Nationals	11–3	**Strider** (6–13)	Parker (8–16)	—	13,979	67–83	W2
151	September 16 (1)	@ Nationals	6–3	**Suárez** (2–0)	Irvin (8–13)	**Iglesias** (26)	15,584	68–83	W3
152	September 16 (2)	@ Nationals	5–0 (10)	**Kinley** (6–3)	Thompson (1–1)	—	19,216	69–83	W4
153	September 17	@ Nationals	9–4	**Waldrep** (5–1)	Beeter (0–3)	―	14,420	70–83	W5
154	September 19	@ Tigers	10–1	**Elder** (8–10)	Morton (9–11)	—	33,554	71–83	W6
155	September 20	@ Tigers	6–5	**Dodd** (1–0)	Vest (6–5)	**Iglesias** (27)	38,079	72–83	W7
156	September 21	@ Tigers	6–2	**Strider** (7–13)	Mize (14–6)	—	34,042	73–83	W8
157	September 22	Nationals	11–5	**Sale** (6–5)	Gore (5–15)	—	35,248	74–83	W9
158	September 23	Nationals	3–2	**Waldrep** (6–1)	Lord (5–9)	**Iglesias** (28)	37,322	75–83	W10
159	September 24	Nationals	3–4	Parker (9–16)	**Elder** (8–11)	Ferrer (10)	32,898	75–84	L1
160	September 26	Pirates	3–9	Ramírez (3–3)	**Wentz** (5–7)	—	34,500	75–85	L2
161	September 27	Pirates	1–3	Chandler (4–1)	**Strider** (7–14)	Santana (16)	35,007	75–86	L3
162	September 28	Pirates	4–1	**Sale** (7–5)	Oviedo (2–1)	**Iglesias** (29)	35,827	76–86	W1

== Roster ==
2025 Atlanta Braves
Roster
Pitchers: 63 Scott Blewett; 60 John Brebbia; 49 Aaron Bummer; 59 Carlos Carrasco; 60 Jesse Chavez; 68 Austin Cox; 58 Davis Daniel; 61 Enyel De Los Santos; 48 Alexis Díaz; 46,53 Dylan Dodd; 34 Dane Dunning; 55 Bryce Elder; 22 Erick Fedde; 75 Didier Fuentes; 79 Hayden Harris; 57 Kevin Herget; 62 Daysbel Hernández; 66 Grant Holmes; 26 Raisel Iglesias; 38 Pierce Johnson; 46 Craig Kimbrel; 45 Tyler Kinley; 52 Dylan Lee; 40 Reynaldo López; 48 Rafael Montero; 50 Charlie Morton; 70 Rolddy Muñoz; 50 Héctor Neris; 53 Joel Payamps; 70 Michael Petersen; 48 Cal Quantrill; 63 José Ruiz; 51 Chris Sale; 56 Spencer Schwellenbach; 61 Connor Seabold; 32 AJ Smith-Shawver; 65 Hunter Stratton; 99 Spencer Strider; 54 José Suárez; 45,50 Wander Suero; 73 Zach Thompson; 30 Hurston Waldrep; 33 Joey Wentz; 71 Nathan Wiles	Catchers: 30 Drake Baldwin; 8,9 Sandy León; 12 Sean Murphy; 45 Chadwick Tromp; Infielders: 1 Ozzie Albies; 2 Nick Allen; 67 Nacho Alvarez Jr.; 11 Orlando Arcia; 17 Vidal Bruján; 9 Ha-seong Kim; 28 Matt Olson; 19 Jonathan Ornelas; 27 Austin Riley; 65 Luke Williams; 60 Brett Wisely	Outfielders: 13 Ronald Acuña Jr.; 18 José Azócar; 14 Bryan De La Cruz; 17 Stuart Fairchild; 16 Jake Fraley; 23 Michael Harris II; 24 Jarred Kelenic; 7 Jurickson Profar; 9 Eddie Rosario; 8 Alex Verdugo; 36 Eli White; Other batters: 20 Marcell Ozuna	Manager: 43 Brian Snitker; Coaches: 85 Erick Abreu (bullpen); 86 Fredi González (third base); 88 Tom Goodwin (first base); 80 Tim Hyers (hitting); 10 Chipper Jones (hitting consultant); 39 Rick Kranitz (pitching); 83 Carlos Méndez (assistant hitting); 95 Eddie Pérez (assistant); 82 Hugh Quattlebaum (assistant hitting); 89 Matt Tuiasosopo (third base); 4 Walt Weiss (bench); 96 José Yepez (bullpen catcher)

== Player stats ==
= Indicates team leader

= Indicates league leader

=== Batting ===
Note: G = Games played; AB = At bats; R = Runs scored; H = Hits; 2B = Doubles; 3B = Triples; HR = Home runs; RBI = Runs batted in; SB = Stolen bases; BB = Walks; AVG = Batting average; SLG = Slugging average

Player	G	AB	R	H	2B	3B	HR	RBI	SB	BB	AVG	SLG
Matt Olson	162	624	98	170	41	2	29	95	1	91	.272	.484
Michael Harris II	160	611	55	152	26	6	20	86	20	16	.249	.409
Ozzie Albies	157	603	74	145	23	2	16	74	14	55	.240	.365
Marcell Ozuna	145	487	61	113	19	0	21	68	0	94	.232	.400
Austin Riley	102	416	54	108	20	1	16	54	2	27	.260	.428
Drake Baldwin	124	405	56	111	18	2	19	80	0	38	.274	.469
Nick Allen	135	371	32	82	11	0	0	22	8	31	.221	.251
Ronald Acuña Jr.	95	338	74	98	12	1	21	42	9	71	.290	.518
Jurickson Profar	80	318	56	78	16	1	14	43	9	48	.245	.434
Sean Murphy	94	291	34	58	13	0	16	45	0	35	.199	.409
Eli White	105	256	43	60	8	3	10	35	10	11	.234	.406
Alex Verdugo	56	197	21	47	10	0	0	12	1	14	.239	.289
Nacho Alvarez Jr.	58	188	18	44	12	0	2	15	0	12	.234	.330
Ha-Seong Kim	24	87	14	22	1	0	3	12	0	8	.253	.368
Jarred Kelenic	24	60	7	10	2	0	2	2	0	5	.167	.300
Stuart Fairchild	28	51	7	11	4	1	0	2	2	4	.216	.333
Bryan De La Cruz	16	47	1	9	1	0	0	0	1	3	.191	.213
Vidal Bruján	23	41	8	11	2	0	0	5	0	5	.268	.317
Luke Williams	39	31	5	4	2	0	0	5	5	1	.129	.194
Orlando Arcia	14	31	1	6	1	0	0	1	0	1	.194	.226
Jake Fraley	9	23	2	7	1	0	0	0	0	1	.304	.348
Sandy León	5	12	1	1	0	0	1	3	0	0	.083	.333
Brett Wisely	4	6	0	0	0	0	0	0	0	3	.000	.000
Chadwick Tromp	2	5	0	0	0	0	0	0	0	1	.000	.000
Eddie Rosario	3	4	1	0	0	0	0	0	0	0	.000	.000
Jonathan Ornelas	2	4	1	2	0	0	0	0	0	0	.500	.500
José Azócar	2	1	0	0	0	0	0	0	0	0	.000	.000
Totals	162	5508	724	1349	243	19	190	701	82	575	.245	.399

Source:Baseball Reference

=== Pitching ===
Note: W = Wins; L = Losses; ERA = Earned run average; G = Games pitched; GS = Games started; SV = Saves; IP = Innings pitched; H = Hits allowed; R = Runs allowed; ER = Earned runs allowed; BB = Walks allowed; SO = Strikeouts

Player	W	L	ERA	G	GS	SV	IP	H	R	ER	BB	SO
Bryce Elder	8	11	5.30	28	28	0	156.1	167	95	92	51	131
Chris Sale	7	5	2.58	21	20	0	125.2	102	38	36	32	165
Spencer Strider	7	14	4.45	23	23	0	125.1	124	63	62	51	131
Grant Holmes	4	9	3.99	22	21	0	115.0	100	52	51	54	123
Spencer Schwellenbach	7	4	3.09	17	17	0	110.2	89	44	38	18	108
Dylan Lee	2	4	3.29	74	0	2	68.1	53	27	25	14	76
Raisel Iglesias	4	6	3.21	70	0	29	67.1	51	25	24	16	73
Joey Wentz	3	6	4.92	14	13	0	64.0	68	38	35	23	64
Pierce Johnson	3	3	3.05	65	0	1	59.0	52	21	20	19	59
Hurston Waldrep	6	1	2.88	10	9	0	56.1	45	18	18	22	55
Aaron Bummer	3	2	3.81	42	2	0	54.1	51	27	23	17	51
AJ Smith-Shawver	3	2	3.86	9	9	0	44.1	42	20	19	21	42
Enyel De Los Santos	3	3	4.53	43	0	0	43.2	39	25	22	18	38
Daysbel Hernández	4	3	3.41	39	0	0	37.0	27	16	14	30	33
Dylan Dodd	1	0	3.60	28	0	0	35.0	28	14	14	5	30
Rafael Montero	0	1	5.50	36	0	0	34.1	27	22	21	21	34
Tyler Kinley	5	0	0.72	24	0	0	25.0	11	2	2	6	22
Erick Fedde	1	2	8.10	5	4	0	23.1	30	21	21	13	13
Austin Cox	0	0	8.86	13	1	0	21.1	30	21	21	7	22
José Suárez	2	0	1.86	7	1	1	19.1	15	5	4	10	16
Scott Blewett	2	0	5.51	11	1	0	16.1	16	11	10	10	13
Hunter Stratton	1	1	2.20	12	0	1	16.1	13	5	4	5	15
Carlos Carrasco	0	0	9.88	3	3	0	13.2	22	15	15	7	9
Didier Fuentes	0	3	13.85	4	4	0	13.0	23	20	20	6	12
Davis Daniel	0	1	5.40	3	2	0	10.0	9	6	6	7	9
Jesse Chavez	0	1	9.00	4	0	0	8.0	14	8	8	5	8
Cal Quantrill	0	2	13.50	2	2	0	8.0	14	12	12	5	3
Michael Peterson	0	0	4.05	4	0	0	6.2	7	3	3	2	5
Wander Suero	0	0	11.37	5	0	0	6.1	10	8	8	4	7
Luke Williams	0	0	3.00	6	0	0	6.0	6	2	2	1	4
Reynaldo López	0	0	5.40	1	1	0	5.0	9	3	3	2	1
John Brebbia	0	1	7.71	3	0	0	4.2	6	5	4	1	6
Rolddy Muñoz	0	0	12.27	3	0	0	3.2	4	5	5	5	5
Connor Seabold	0	0	9.82	4	0	0	3.2	5	4	4	3	5
Zach Thompson	0	0	0.00	2	0	0	3.2	0	0	0	1	3
Alexis Díaz	0	0	10.13	3	0	0	2.2	0	4	3	5	5
Joel Payamps	0	0	3.38	2	0	0	2.2	2	1	1	0	2
Hayden Harris	0	0	3.38	3	0	0	2.2	3	1	1	2	0
Vidal Bruján	0	0	13.50	2	0	0	2.0	4	3	3	1	0
José Ruiz	0	0	13.50	2	0	0	2.0	2	3	3	3	3
Charlie Morton	0	0	0.00	1	1	0	1.1	2	0	0	1	1
Kevin Herget	0	0	0.00	1	0	0	1.0	1	0	0	2	0
Craig Kimbrel	0	0	0.00	1	0	0	1.0	1	0	0	1	1
Nathan Wiles	0	0	27.00	1	0	0	1.0	4	3	3	0	1
Héctor Neris	0	1	45.00	2	0	0	1.0	5	5	5	1	1
Totals	76	86	4.36	162	162	34	1438.0	1348	734	697	530	'1416

Note: No ERA qualifiers because of no pitchers compiling 162 innings (1 IP per scheduled game).

Source:Baseball Reference

== Farm system ==
Level	Team	League	Manager
AAA	Gwinnett Stripers	International League	
AA	Columbus Clingstones	Southern League	
High-A	Rome Emperors	South Atlantic League	
A	Augusta GreenJackets	Carolina League	
Rookie	FCL Braves	Florida Complex League	
Rookie	DSL Braves	Dominican Summer League	
