= List of Arizona Diamondbacks Opening Day starting pitchers =

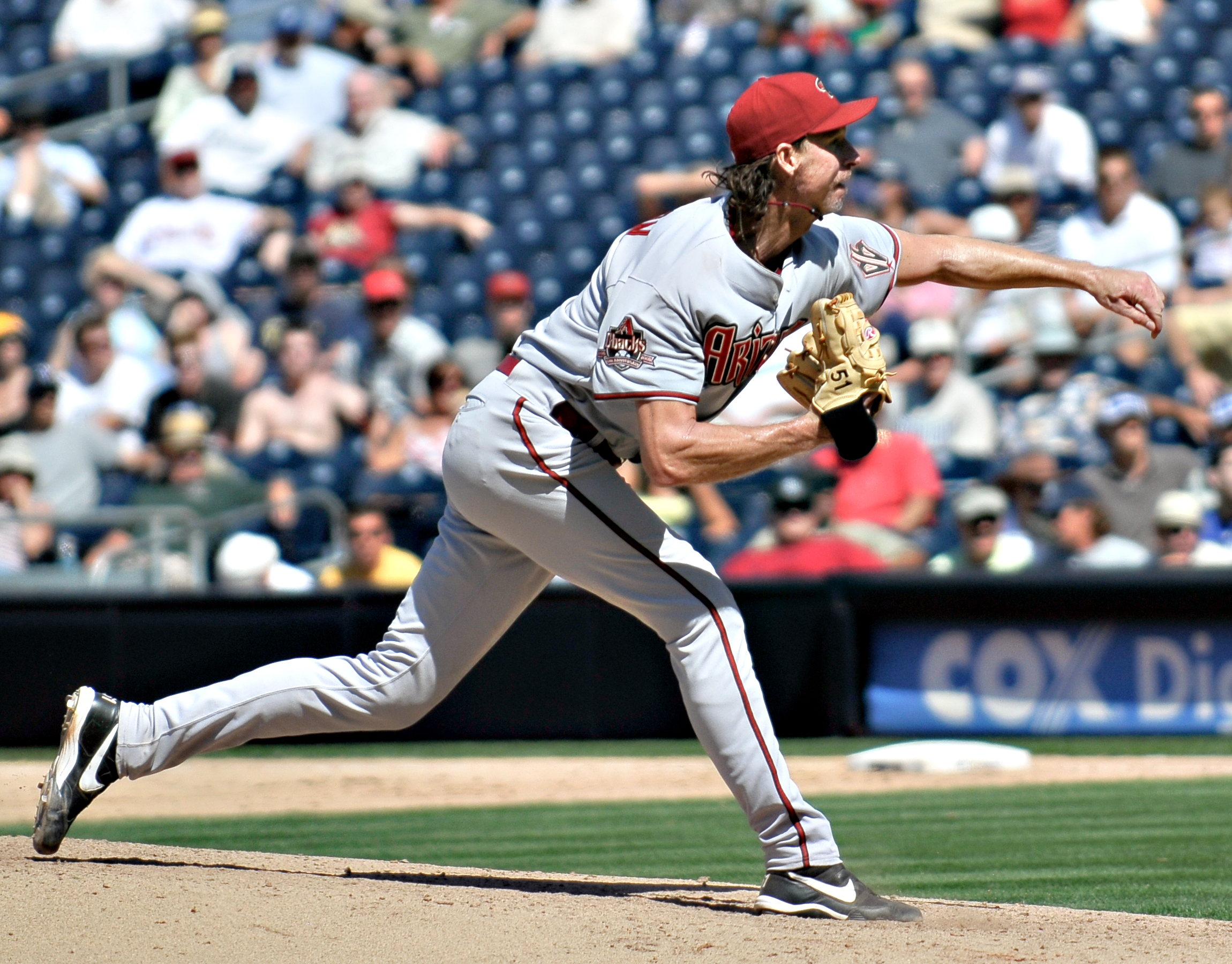
Randy Johnson, the Opening Day starter from 1999 to 2004

The Arizona Diamondbacks are a Major League Baseball (MLB) franchise based in Phoenix, Arizona. They play in the National League West division. The first game of the new baseball season for a team is played on Opening Day, and being named the Opening Day starter is an honor, which is often given to the player who is expected to lead the pitching staff that season, though there are various strategic reasons why a team's best pitcher might not start on Opening Day. The Diamondbacks have used 10 different Opening Day starting pitchers in their 22 seasons. The 10 starters have a combined Opening Day record of eight wins, eight losses (8–8), and six no decisions. No decisions are only awarded to the starting pitcher if the game is won or lost after the starting pitcher has left the game.

Randy Johnson holds the Diamondbacks' record for most Opening Day starts with six, and has an Opening Day record of 3–2. Brandon Webb started four Opening Days, and Ian Kennedy has been the Opening Day starter thrice. Andy Benes, Javier Vázquez, Dan Haren, and Wade Miley have started one Opening Day each. Kennedy has the best winning percentage as the Opening Day starting pitcher with a record of 2–0. Benes, Vázquez, and Miley are tied for the worst Opening Day record, at 0–1. Webb is Arizona's only pitcher with multiple no-decisions on Opening Day (three), and Johnson is the only pitcher to have won three or more opening games.

Overall, the Diamondbacks have a record of 8–7 at home on Opening Day, compared to a 4–3 record at away games. The Diamondbacks went on to play in the National League Division Series (NLDS) playoff games in 1999, 2001, 2002, 2007, 2011, 2017, and 2023, winning the National League Championship Series in 2001 and 2023, and the World Series in 2001.

== Key ==
Season	Each year is linked to an article about that particular Diamondbacks season.
W	Win
L	Loss
ND (W)	No decision by starting pitcher; Diamondbacks won game
ND (L)	No decision by starting pitcher; Diamondbacks lost game
Pitcher (#)	Number of appearances as Opening Day starter with the Diamondbacks
*	Advanced to the postseason
**	Won National League Championship Series
†	Won World Series

== Pitchers ==
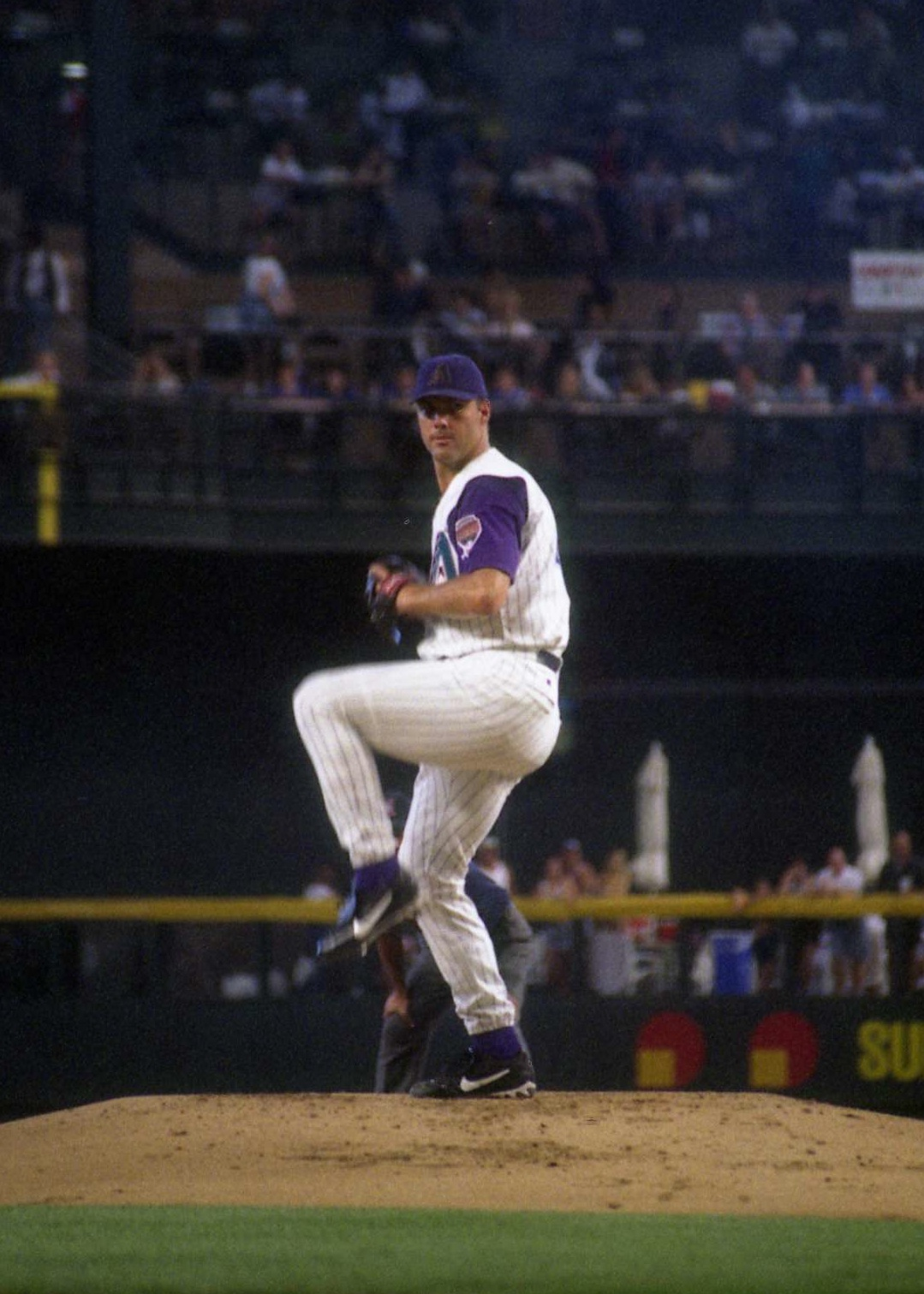
Andy Benes was the starter for the 1998 Opening Day, Arizona's first season

Season	Pitcher	Decision	Opponent	Location	Ref(s)
1998	Andy Benes	L	Colorado Rockies	Chase Field	
1999*	Randy Johnson	ND (L)	Los Angeles Dodgers	Dodger Stadium	
2000	Randy Johnson (2)	W	Philadelphia Phillies	Chase Field	
2001†	Randy Johnson (3)	W	Los Angeles Dodgers	Dodger Stadium	
2002*	Randy Johnson (4)	W	San Diego Padres	Chase Field	
2003	Randy Johnson (5)	L	Los Angeles Dodgers	Chase Field	
2004	Randy Johnson (6)	L	Colorado Rockies	Chase Field	
2005	Javier Vázquez	L	Chicago Cubs	Chase Field	
2006	Brandon Webb	ND (L)	Colorado Rockies	Coors Field	
2007*	Brandon Webb (2)	ND (W)	Colorado Rockies	Coors Field	
2008	Brandon Webb (3)	W	Cincinnati Reds	Great American Ball Park	
2009	Brandon Webb (4)	ND (W)	Colorado Rockies	Chase Field	
2010	Dan Haren	W	San Diego Padres	Chase Field	
2011*	Ian Kennedy	ND (W)	Colorado Rockies	Coors Field	
2012	Ian Kennedy (2)	W	San Francisco Giants	Chase Field	
2013	Ian Kennedy (3)	W	St. Louis Cardinals	Chase Field	
2014	Wade Miley	L	Los Angeles Dodgers	Sydney Cricket Ground	
2015	Josh Collmenter	L	San Francisco Giants	Chase Field	
2016	Zack Greinke	L	Colorado Rockies	Chase Field	
2017	Zack Greinke (2)	ND (W)	San Francisco Giants	Chase Field	
2018	Patrick Corbin	W	Colorado Rockies	Chase Field	
2019	Zack Greinke (3)	ND (L)	Los Angeles Dodgers	Dodger Stadium	
2020	Madison Bumgarner	L	San Diego Padres	Petco Park	
2021	Madison Bumgarner (2)	ND (L)	San Diego Padres	Petco Park	
2022	Madison Bumgarner (3)	ND (W)	San Diego Padres	Chase Field	
2023**	Zac Gallen	L	Los Angeles Dodgers	Dodger Stadium	
2024	Zac Gallen (2)	W	Colorado Rockies	Chase Field	
2025	Zac Gallen (3)	L	Chicago Cubs	Chase Field	
2026	Zac Gallen (4)	L	Los Angeles Dodgers	Dodger Stadium	

== Pitchers ==
Opening Day starting pitchers listed in descending order by the number of Opening Day starts for the Diamondbacks:

Pitcher	Starts	Wins	Losses	No Decisions	Winning %	Seasons
Randy Johnson	6	3	2	1	.500	1999, 2000, 2001, 2002, 2003, 2004
Zac Gallen	4	1	2	0	.333	2023, 2024, 2025, 2026
Brandon Webb	4	1	0	3	1.000	2006, 2007, 2008, 2009
Madison Bumgarner	3	0	1	2	.000	2020, 2021, 2022
Zack Greinke	3	0	1	2	.000	2016, 2017, 2019
Ian Kennedy	3	2	0	1	1.000	2011, 2012, 2013
Andy Benes	1	0	1	0	.000	1998
Josh Collmenter	1	0	1	0	.000	2015
Patrick Corbin	1	1	0	0	1.000	2018
Dan Haren	1	1	0	0	1.000	2010
Wade Miley	1	0	1	0	.000	2014
Javier Vázquez	1	0	1	0	.000	2005
