= Steve Dreyer =

American baseball player (born 1969)

- Pitcher
- Born: November 19, 1969 (age 56); Ames, Iowa, U.S.
- Batted: Right Threw: Right

MLB debut
- August 8, 1993, for the Texas Rangers

Last MLB appearance
- April 30, 1994, for the Texas Rangers

MLB statistics
- Win–loss record: 4–4
- Earned run average: 5.71
- Strikeouts: 34
- Stats at Baseball Reference

Teams
- Texas Rangers (1993–1994)

Steven William Dreyer (born November 19, 1969) is an American former professional baseball pitcher. He played in Major League Baseball (MLB) from 1993 to 1994 for the Texas Rangers.

== Career ==
Dreyer was drafted by the Texas Rangers in the 8th round, with the 219th overall selection, of the 1990 Major League Baseball draft. His career highlight was coming out of the bullpen in relief of Nolan Ryan in his final major-league appearance on September 22, 1993.

== Personal life ==
Dreyer currently teaches physical education at Rogers Elementary School in Marshalltown, Iowa.

His son, Jack, pitched for the University of Iowa and currently plays with the Los Angeles Dodgers.
