= Collin Wiles =

American baseball player (born 1994)

Tigres de Quintana Roo – No. 31
- Pitcher
- Born: May 30, 1994 (age 32); Overland Park, Kansas, U.S.
- Bats: Right Throws: Right

MLB debut
- September 14, 2022, for the Oakland Athletics

MLB statistics (through 2022 season)
- Win–loss record: 0–0
- Earned run average: 4.66
- Strikeouts: 9
- Stats at Baseball Reference

Teams
- Oakland Athletics (2022)

Collin James Wiles (born May 30, 1994) is an American professional baseball pitcher for the Tigres de Quintana Roo of the Mexican League. The Texas Rangers drafted him in the first round of the 2012 MLB draft. He has previously played in Major League Baseball (MLB) for the Oakland Athletics.

== Career ==
=== Texas Rangers ===
Collin attended Blue Valley West High School in Stillwell, Kansas. He was drafted in the first round, with the 53rd overall selection, of the 2012 Major League Baseball draft by the Texas Rangers. He made his professional debut with the rookie-level Arizona League Rangers, logging a 6.87 ERA in 14 games (12 starts). In 2013, Wiles played for the Low-A Spokane Indians, making 14 starts and working to a 2-7 record and 3.09 ERA with 40 strikeouts in 67 innings pitched.

Wiles began the 2014 season with the Single-A Hickory Crawdads. Making 17 appearances (8 starts), he logged a 2-3 record and 4.06 ERA with 42 strikeouts in 57 2/3 innings. He returned to Hickory in 2015, making 22 appearances (20 starts) and improving to an 11-3 record and 2.96 ERA with 72 strikeouts in 130 2/3 innings pitched. Wiles was assigned to the High-A High Desert Mavericks to begin the 2016 season. He started 23 games for the Mavericks, registering a 3-8 record and 4.89 ERA with 80 strikeouts in 127 innings pitched.

In 2017, Wiles spent the year with the Frisco RoughRiders. He made 28 appearances (25 starts) for the team, registering a 9-12 record and 4.86 ERA with 107 strikeouts in 150 innings pitched. On May 9, 2018, Wiles underwent Tommy John surgery, ending his season. In 4 starts for Frisco, he had posted a 6.10 ERA with 26 strikeouts in 20 2/3 innings of work.

He returned to action in June 2019 with the rookie-level AZL Rangers. In 13 combined appearances (11 starts) between the AZL Rangers, High-A Down East Wood Ducks, and Double-A Frisco, Wiles logged a 1-5 record and 5.36 ERA with 41 strikeouts in 48 2/3 innings of work. Wiles did not play in a game in 2020 due to the cancellation of the minor league season because of the COVID-19 pandemic. He became a free agent following the season on November 2.

On December 28, 2020, Wiles re-signed with the Rangers organization on a minor league contract. He was assigned to the Triple-A Round Rock Express to begin the 2021 season. In 23 games (11 starts), Wiles posted a 7-2 record and 4.19 ERA with 82 strikeouts in 86 innings pitched. He elected free agency following the season on November 7, 2021.

=== Oakland Athletics ===
On March 10, 2022, Wiles signed a minor league contract with the Oakland Athletics organization. He began the year with the Triple-A Las Vegas Aviators, making 26 starts and posting a 9-11 record and 5.40 ERA with 106 strikeouts in 143 1/3 innings pitched.

On September 11, 2022, Wiles was selected to the 40-man roster and promoted to the major leagues for the first time. He made 4 appearances for Oakland, pitching to a 4.66 ERA with 9 strikeouts in 9 2/3 innings of work. His season ended on September 30 after he suffered a strain in his throwing shoulder. On November 3, he was removed from the 40-man roster and sent outright to Triple-A. He elected free agency following the season on November 10.

=== Milwaukee Brewers ===
On December 20, 2022, Wiles signed a minor league contract with an invite to spring training with the Milwaukee Brewers. Wiles was released by the Brewers organization on February 3, 2023. The release came shortly before Wiles underwent season-ending surgery on his right shoulder.

=== Texas Rangers (second stint) ===
On April 18, 2024, Wiles signed a minor league contract with the Texas Rangers. In 4 starts split between the Triple–A Round Rock Express and rookie–level Arizona Complex League Rangers, he struggled to a combined 6.23 ERA with 7 strikeouts over 8 2/3 innings. Wiles was released by the Rangers organization on July 29.

=== Kansas City Monarchs ===
On August 6, 2024, Wiles signed with the Kansas City Monarchs of the American Association of Professional Baseball. In 5 starts for the Monarchs, he posted an 0–1 record and 3.48 ERA with 20 strikeouts across 20 2/3 innings pitched.

=== Bravos de León ===
On March 13, 2025, Wiles signed with the Leones de Yucatán of the Mexican League. However, he did not appear in a game for Yucatán and signed with the Bravos de León on May 4. In four appearances (three starts) for León, Wiles struggled to an 0-2 record and 8.10 ERA with three strikeouts across 13 1/3 innings pitched. He was released by the Bravos on May 22.

=== Tigres de Quintana Roo ===
On May 22, 2026, Wiles signed with the Tigres de Quintana Roo of the Mexican League.

== Personal life ==
Collin’s younger brother, Nathan, was drafted by the Tampa Bay Rays in the 8th round of the 2019 MLB draft, and made his debut with the Atlanta Braves in 2025.
