= Tristin English =

American baseball player (born 1997)

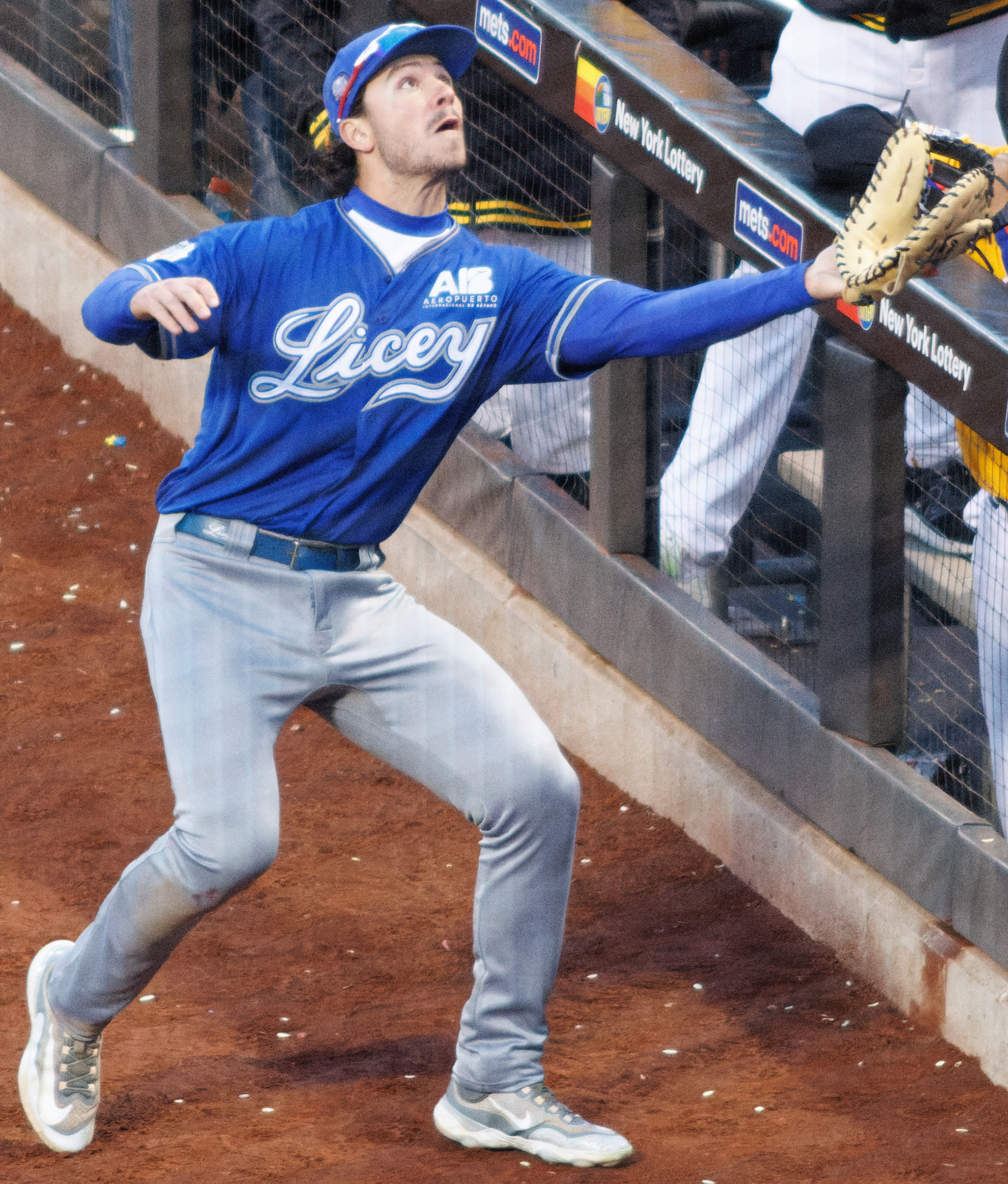
- English with the Tigres del Licey in 2023

Lancaster Stormers – No. 18
- First baseman
- Born: May 17, 1997 (age 29); Stockbridge, Georgia, U.S.
- Bats: Right Throws: Right

MLB debut
- July 9, 2025, for the Arizona Diamondbacks

MLB statistics (through 2025 season)
- Batting average: .091
- Home runs: 0
- Runs batted in: 1
- Stats at Baseball Reference

Teams
- Arizona Diamondbacks (2025)

Tristin Hall English (born May 14, 1997) is an American professional baseball first baseman for the Lancaster Stormers of the Atlantic League of Professional Baseball. He has previously played in Major League Baseball (MLB) for the Arizona Diamondbacks.

== Amateur career ==
English attended Pike County High School in Zebulon, Georgia. As a senior in 2015, he batted .632 with seven home runs and 45 RBIs. He was selected by the Cleveland Indians in the 39th round of the 2015 Major League Baseball draft, but did not sign and instead enrolled at Georgia Tech to play college baseball for the Georgia Tech Yellow Jackets.

After hitting .315 with five home runs and 44 RBIs as a freshman at Georgia Tech in 2016, he missed the 2017 season after undergoing Tommy John surgery. In 2018, he played collegiate summer baseball for the Chatham Anglers of the Cape Cod Baseball League and was named a league all-star. In 2019, he hit .346 with 18 home runs and 71 RBIs over 58 games for Georgia Tech.

== Professional career ==
=== Arizona Diamondbacks ===
The Arizona Diamondbacks selected English in the third round of the 2019 Major League Baseball draft. He signed and made his professional debut with the Hillsboro Hops, hitting .290 with seven home runs and thirty RBI over fifty games. English did not play in a game in 2020 due to the cancellation of the minor league season because of the COVID-19 pandemic.

English returned to Hillsboro for the 2021 season, batting .242 with ten home runs and 48 RBI over 83 games. English split the 2022 season between Hillsboro and the Amarillo Sod Poodles and hit a combined .269 with 12 home runs and 49 RBI over 104 games. He returned to Amarillo to open the 2023 season and was promoted to the Reno Aces in early May. Over 102 games between both teams, he batted .300 with 23 home runs and 93 RBI. English was assigned to Reno to open the 2024 season and hit .263 with 16 home runs and 63 RBI over 111 games. He returned to Reno to open the 2025 season.

On July 6, 2025, English was selected to the 40-man roster and promoted to the major leagues for the first time. He made his MLB debut on July 9. In seven appearances for Arizona, English went 2-for-22 (.091) with one RBI and one walk. English was designated for assignment by the Diamondbacks following the promotion of Taylor Rashi on August 27. He cleared waivers and was sent outright to Triple-A Reno on August 30. English elected free agency following the season on November 6. With Reno, he hit .325 with 14 home runs and 77 RBI over 93 games.

=== Atlanta Braves ===
On December 22, 2025, English signed a minor league contract with the Atlanta Braves. He began the 2026 season with the Double-A Columbus Clingstones before earning a promotion to the Triple-A Gwinnett Stripers. In 41 games between the two affiliates, English batted .219 with five home runs and 20 RBI. On June 22, 2026, English was released by the Braves organization.

=== Lancaster Stormers ===
On July 10, 2026, English signed with the Lancaster Stormers of the Atlantic League of Professional Baseball.

== Personal life ==
English and his fiancé, Rachel, had their first child, a daughter, in 2022.
