= Kyle Backhus =

American baseball player (born 1998)

Philadelphia Phillies – No. 19
- Pitcher
- Born: January 31, 1998 (age 28); New Waverly, Texas, U.S.
- Bats: Left Throws: Left

MLB debut
- June 8, 2025, for the Arizona Diamondbacks

MLB statistics (through 2026 season)
- Win–loss record: 2–4
- Earned run average: 4.76
- Strikeouts: 42
- Stats at Baseball Reference

Teams
- Arizona Diamondbacks (2025); Philadelphia Phillies (2026–present)

Kyle Jordan Backhus (born January 31, 1998) is an American professional baseball pitcher for the Philadelphia Phillies of Major League Baseball (MLB). He has previously played in MLB for the Arizona Diamondbacks. He made his MLB debut in 2025.

== Career ==
=== Arizona Diamondbacks ===
Backhus played college baseball at Sam Houston State from 2017 to 2021. He signed with the Arizona Diamondbacks as an undrafted free agent on July 20, 2021. Backhus split his first professional season between the High-A Visalia Rawhide and High-A Hillsboro Hops. He split the 2022 campaign between the Double-A Amarillo Sod Poodles and Hillsboro, accumulating a 3-5 record and 3.27 ERA with 78 strikeouts and six saves in 52 1/3 innings pitched over 40 games.

Backhus split the 2023 season between Amarillo and the Triple-A Reno Aces. In 51 appearances out of the bullpen for the two affiliates, he posted a combined 5-5 record and 3.67 ERA with 76 strikeouts and 10 saves across 68 2/3 innings pitched. Backhus made 38 appearances for Reno and the rookie-level Arizona Complex League Diamondbacks in 2024, compiling an aggregate 2-3 record and 3.79 ERA with 44 strikeouts and one save across 35 2/3 innings pitched.

Backhus began the 2025 season with Triple-A Reno, posting a 4-4 record and 2.22 ERA with 36 strikeouts in 24 1/3 innings pitched across 22 appearances. On June 8, 2025, Backhus was selected to the 40-man roster and promoted to the major leagues for the first time. He made 32 appearances for the Diamondbacks during his rookie campaign, compiling an 0-3 record and 4.62 ERA with 22 strikeouts and two saves over 25 1/3 innings pitched.

=== Philadelphia Phillies ===
On December 19, 2025, Backhus was traded to the Philadelphia Phillies in exchange for Avery Owusu-Asiedu. On June 28, 2026, Backhus recorded his first career win after tossing 2/3 of a scoreless inning against the New York Mets.
