= Christian Montes De Oca =

Dominican baseball player (born 1999)

Free agent
- Pitcher
- Born: August 30, 1999 (age 26); Santo Domingo, Dominican Republic
- Bats: Right Throws: Right

MLB debut
- June 7, 2025, for the Arizona Diamondbacks

MLB statistics (through 2025 season)
- Win–loss record: 0–0
- Earned run average: 0.00
- Strikeouts: 2
- Stats at Baseball Reference

Teams
- Arizona Diamondbacks (2025)

Christian Montes De Oca (born August 30, 1999) is a Dominican professional baseball pitcher who is a free agent. He made his Major League Baseball (MLB) debut in 2025 for the Diamondbacks.

== Career ==
On December 14, 2021, Montes De Oca signed with the Arizona Diamondbacks as an international free agent. In 2022, he split his first professional season between the Single-A Visalia Rawhide and High-A Hillsboro Hops. In 34 appearances for the two affiliates, Montes De Oca compiled an aggregate 0-3 record and 2.95 ERA with 71 strikeouts and 13 saves across 39 2/3 innings pitched.

In 2023, Montes De Oca made 43 appearances out of the bullpen for the rookie-level Arizona Complex League Diamondbacks and Double-A Amarillo Sod Poodles, logging a 2-3 record and 4.82 ERA with 56 strikeouts and nine saves. He split the 2024 season between Amarillo and the Triple-A Reno Aces. In 50 relief outings for the two affiliates, Montes De Oca compiled a 4-5 record and 4.87 ERA with 53 strikeouts and 10 saves across 61 innings of work.

Montes De Oca began the 2025 season with Triple-A Reno. On May 16, he was selected to the 40-man roster and promoted to the major leagues for the first time. He was optioned back to Reno on May 22, without having made an appearance with Arizona, briefly becoming a phantom ballplayer. On June 7, the Diamondbacks recalled Montes de Oca to serve as the 27th man for the team's doubleheader against the Cincinnati Reds. He made his major league debut the same day, pitching 2 2/3 scoreless innings in relief. Montes De Oca was placed on the injured list on June 10, due to right elbow inflammation. On June 14, it was announced that Montes De Oca would require lower back surgery, a procedure that was likely to rule him out for the remainder of the season. On November 17, Montes De Oca was removed from the 40-man roster and sent outright to Reno. He was released on February 21, 2026.
