= Nathan Wiles =

American baseball player (born 1998)

Free agent
- Pitcher
- Born: July 2, 1998 (age 28); Overland Park, Kansas, U.S.
- Bats: Right Throws: Right

Professional debut
- MLB: April 22, 2025, for the Atlanta Braves
- KBO: March 31, 2026, for the Kiwoom Heroes

MLB statistics (through 2025 season)
- Win–loss record: 0–0
- Earned run average: 27.00
- Strikeouts: 1

KBO statistics (through 2026 season)
- Win–loss record: 0–4
- Earned run average: 5.40
- Strikeouts: 18
- Stats at Baseball Reference

Teams
- Atlanta Braves (2025); Kiwoom Heroes (2026)

Nathan Daniel Wiles (born July 2, 1998) is an American professional baseball pitcher who is a free agent. He has previously played in Major League Baseball (MLB) for the Atlanta Braves and in the KBO League for the Kiwoom Heroes.

== Amateur career ==
A native of Overland Park, Kansas, Wiles played college baseball for the University of Oklahoma. In 2018, he played collegiate summer baseball with the Yarmouth–Dennis Red Sox of the Cape Cod Baseball League.

== Professional career ==
=== Tampa Bay Rays ===
Wiles was drafted by the Tampa Bay Rays in the 8th round, with the 248th overall selection, of the 2019 Major League Baseball draft. He made his professional debut with the Low-A Hudson Valley Renegades, posting a 3-0 record and 3.06 ERA with 39 strikeouts over 14 games (7 starts). Wiles did not play in a game in 2020 due to the cancellation of the minor league season because of the COVID-19 pandemic.

Wiles underwent Tommy John surgery in March 2021 and missed the entirety of the season. He returned to action in 2022 with the High-A Bowling Green Hot Rods and Triple-A Durham Bulls. In 24 appearances (23 starts) split between the two affiliates, Wiles posted a 2-3 record and 4.70 ERA with 76 strikeouts over 92 innings of work.

Wiles split the 2023 campaign between Durham and the Double-A Montgomery Biscuits. In 27 games (22 starts) for the two affiliates, he compiled an 8-3 record and 5.38 ERA with 96 strikeouts across 110 1/3 innings pitched. Wiles made 35 appearances (11 starts) for Triple-A Durham in 2024, logging a 6-3 record and 5.54 ERA with 72 strikeouts across 87 2/3 innings pitched.

=== Atlanta Braves ===
On March 21, 2025, Wiles was traded to the Atlanta Braves in exchange for cash considerations. He was assigned to the Triple-A Gwinnett Stripers to begin the year, posting an 0.64 ERA with 15 strikeouts over his first three starts. On April 22, Wiles was promoted to the major leagues for the first time. On the same day, Wiles made his major league debut in the 9th inning versus the St. Louis Cardinals, giving up three earned runs and recording his first strikeout. He was released by the Braves on November 4.

=== Kiwoom Heroes ===
On December 16, 2025, Wiles signed a one-year, $910,000 contract with the Kiwoom Heroes of the KBO League. In five starts, he registered a 0–4 record with a 5.40 ERA and 18 strikeouts across 25 innings pitched. On June 27, 2026, Wiles was released by Kiwoom.

== Personal life ==
Nathan’s older brother, Collin, was drafted by the Texas Rangers in the first round of the 2012 MLB draft, and made his debut with the Oakland Athletics in 2022.
