= Zac Gallen =

American baseball player (born 1995)

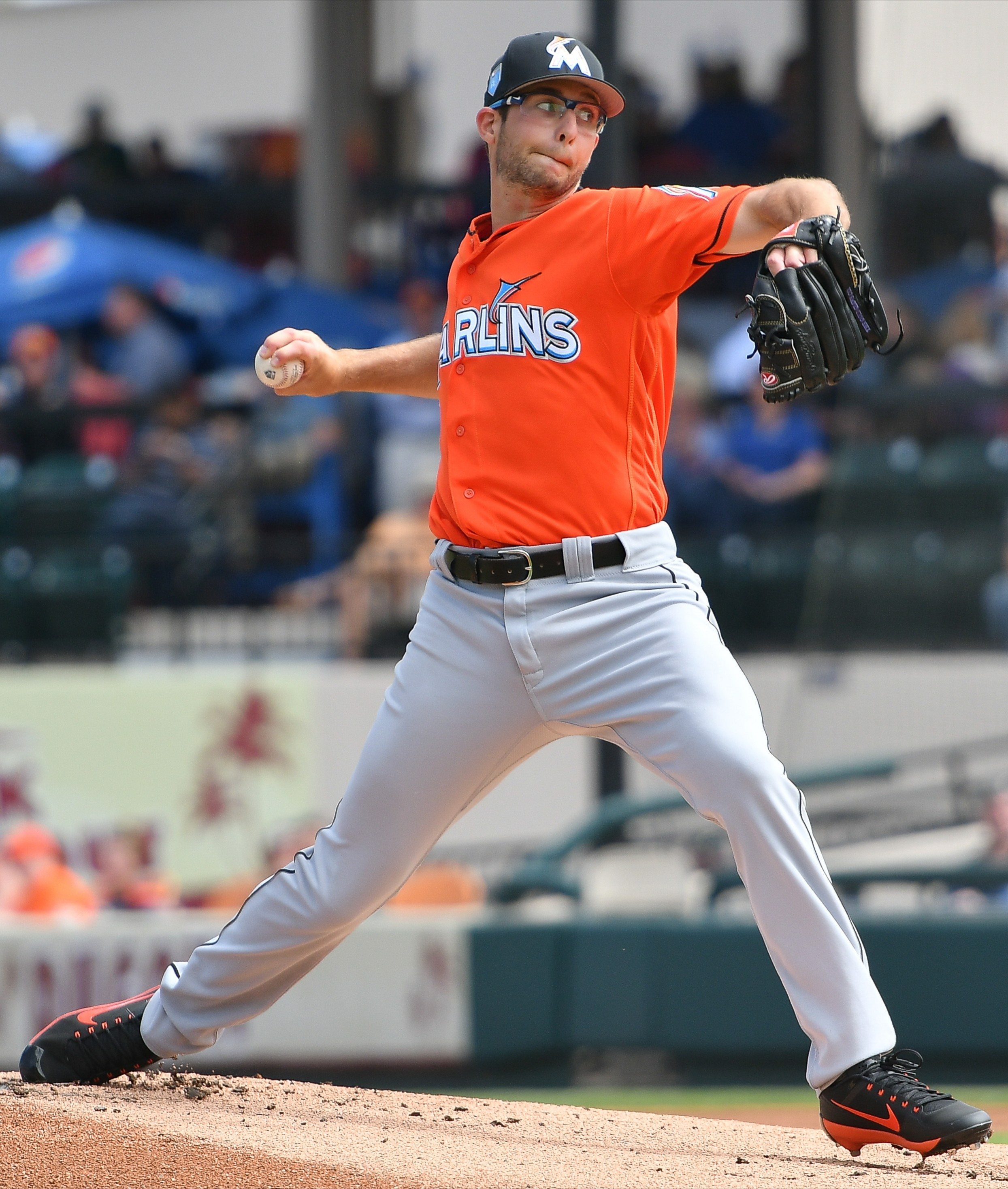
- Gallen with the Miami Marlins in 2018

Free agent
- Pitcher
- Born: August 3, 1995 (age 31); Somerdale, New Jersey, U.S.
- Bats: Right Throws: Right

MLB debut
- June 20, 2019, for the Miami Marlins

MLB statistics (through 2026 season)
- Win–loss record: 69–61
- Earned run average: 3.82
- Strikeouts: 1,124
- Stats at Baseball Reference

Teams
- Miami Marlins (2019); Arizona Diamondbacks (2019–2026)

Career highlights and awards
- All-Star (2023); All-MLB First Team (2023)

Zachary Peter Gallen (born August 3, 1995) is an American professional baseball pitcher who is a free agent. He has played in Major League Baseball (MLB) for the Miami Marlins and Arizona Diamondbacks. He played college baseball for the North Carolina Tar Heels for three seasons before being drafted by the St. Louis Cardinals in the third round of the 2016 MLB draft.

Gallen was traded to the Miami Marlins in 2017 and made his MLB debut with the team in 2019. He was traded to the Diamondbacks midway through the 2019 season. In 2023, he was named the starting pitcher for the National League in the All-Star Game and helped the Diamondbacks reach the 2023 World Series.

== Early life ==
Zachary Peter Gallen was born on August 3, 1995, in Somerdale, New Jersey, to Jim and Stacy Gallen. When he was five years old, he refused to play tee-ball with his peers, instead demanding to play Little League Baseball with the Somerdale team; Gallen was taken in the third round of the Little League draft by his father's team and would play with children between seven and nine years old. At the age of 11, Gallen joined the Tri-state Arsenal Baseball Academy in New Jersey, where he served as a pitcher and second baseman.

Gallen attended Bishop Eustace Preparatory School in Pennsauken Township, New Jersey.

Despite growing up in South Jersey, Gallen grew up a St. Louis Cardinals and Mark McGwire fan.

== College career ==
Gallen attended the University of North Carolina, where he played college baseball for the North Carolina Tar Heels for three seasons. After the 2014 and 2015 seasons, he played collegiate summer baseball with the Chatham Anglers of the Cape Cod Baseball League. During his junior year in 2016, he had a 4–3 win–loss record with a 2.79 earned run average (ERA) along with a .231 batting average against.

== Professional career ==
=== St. Louis Cardinals ===
The St. Louis Cardinals, the team for which Gallen had rooted growing up, selected Gallen in the third round of the 2016 Major League Baseball draft. He made his professional debut with the Gulf Coast League Cardinals, posting a 1.86 ERA with 15 strikeouts in 9 2/3 innings pitched. He started the 2017 season with the Palm Beach Cardinals and was later promoted to the Springfield Cardinals and Memphis Redbirds. He finished the 2017 season with a combined 10–8 record, a 2.93 ERA, and a 1.17 WHIP in 26 starts between all three clubs.

=== Miami Marlins ===
On December 14, 2017, the Cardinals traded Gallen along with Sandy Alcántara, Magneuris Sierra, and Daniel Castano to the Miami Marlins for Marcell Ozuna. Gallen later speculated that the Cardinals traded him to the Marlins because he was reluctant to attend a winter workout camp. He was a non-roster invitee to 2018 spring training. He spent the season with the New Orleans Baby Cakes, going 8–9 with a 3.65 ERA and a 1.47 WHIP in 25 starts. He returned to New Orleans to begin 2019.

On June 20, 2019, the Marlins promoted Gallen to the major leagues for the first time. He made his debut that night in a start against the St. Louis Cardinals, recording six strikeouts and giving up one earned run over five innings pitched.

=== Arizona Diamondbacks ===
On July 31, 2019, the Marlins traded Gallen to the Arizona Diamondbacks in exchange for shortstop Jazz Chisholm Jr. In eight starts for Arizona, Gallen was 2–3 with a 2.89 ERA in 43 2/3 innings, striking out 53. In 2020, Gallen recorded 82 strikeouts in 72 innings. He also finished with an ERA of 2.75 and a 3–2 record.

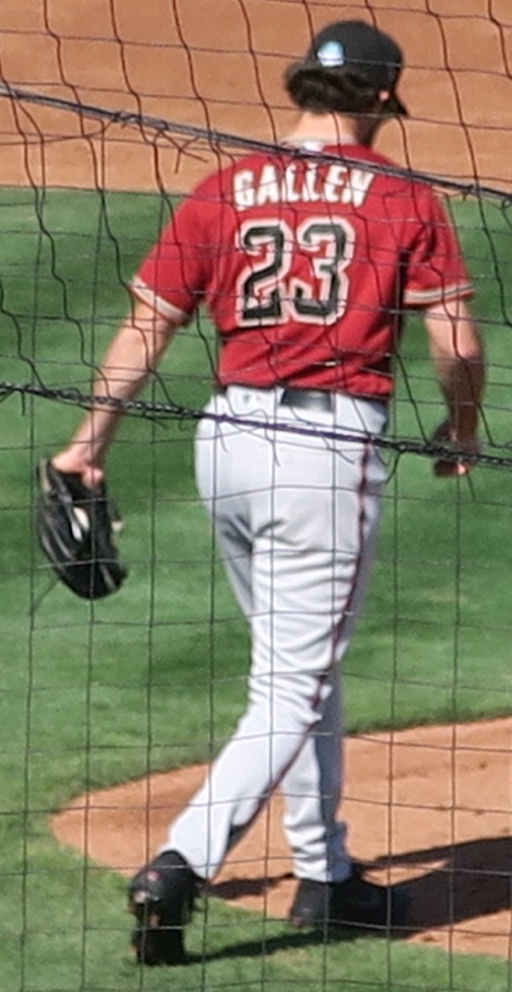
Gallen in 2020

Gallen returned to the Diamondbacks' rotation for 2022. Starting with an August 2 win over the Cleveland Guardians, he posted 34 1/3 consecutive scoreless innings before being named the National League (NL) Pitcher of the Month for August. The scoreless streak continued until a September 11 win over the Colorado Rockies, totaling 44 1/3 innings. It broke Brandon Webb's club record of 42, achieved in 2007, and is the seventh-longest in major league history. During the streak, Gallen produced six consecutive games started without allowing a run, tying the major league record. Gallen won the NL Player of the Week Award for the week of August 29 – September 4 and the NL Pitcher of the Month Award for August. For the 2022 season, Gallen went 12–4 with a 2.54 ERA and 192 strikeouts in 184 innings. He finished fifth in NL Cy Young voting.

On January 13, 2023, Gallen agreed to a one-year, $5.6 million contract with the Diamondbacks, avoiding salary arbitration. He was named NL Player of the Week for the week of April 10–16. He was named to the 2023 MLB All-Star Game. Gallen pitched six no-hit innings in Game 5 of the 2023 World Series, but Arizona lost the series. For the 2023 season, Gallen went 17–9 with a 3.47 ERA and 220 strikeouts in 210 innings. He finished third in NL Cy Young voting.

On January 11, 2024, Gallen agreed to a one-year, $10 million contract with the Diamondbacks, avoiding salary arbitration. On May 31, the Diamondbacks placed Gallen on the 15-day injured list due to a right hamstring strain. He made his return on June 29, when pitched six scoreless innings vs. the Oakland Athletics and only allowing one hit. It was Gallen’s fifth career start of 6+ innings and one hit or fewer, and his second of 2024. For the 2024 season, Gallen went 14–6 with a 3.65 ERA and 156 strikeouts in 148 innings.

On January 9, 2025, Gallen agreed to a one-year, $13.5 million contract with the Diamondbacks, avoiding salary arbitration. Despite the addition of Corbin Burnes to the starting rotation, the Diamondbacks announced that Gallen would be their Opening Day starter for the third straight season. For the 2025 season, Gallen went 13–15 with a 4.83 ERA and 175 strikeouts in 192 innings.

After the 2025 season, Gallen became a free agent. The Diamondbacks made the qualifying offer of a one-year contract for $22.025 million to Gallen, which he declined. On February 15, 2026, Gallen re-signed with the Diamondbacks on a one-year, $22.025 million contract. On July 12, Gallen was placed on the injured list due to right elbow inflammation after being scratched from a scheduled start against the Los Angeles Dodgers. He was transferred to the 60–day injured list on August 3. Gallen was activated on September 9, ahead of a game against the Kansas City Royals.

== See also ==
- Arizona Diamondbacks award winners and league leaders
- List of Major League Baseball annual shutout leaders
- List of World Series starting pitchers
