= Jack Dreyer =

American baseball player (born 1999)

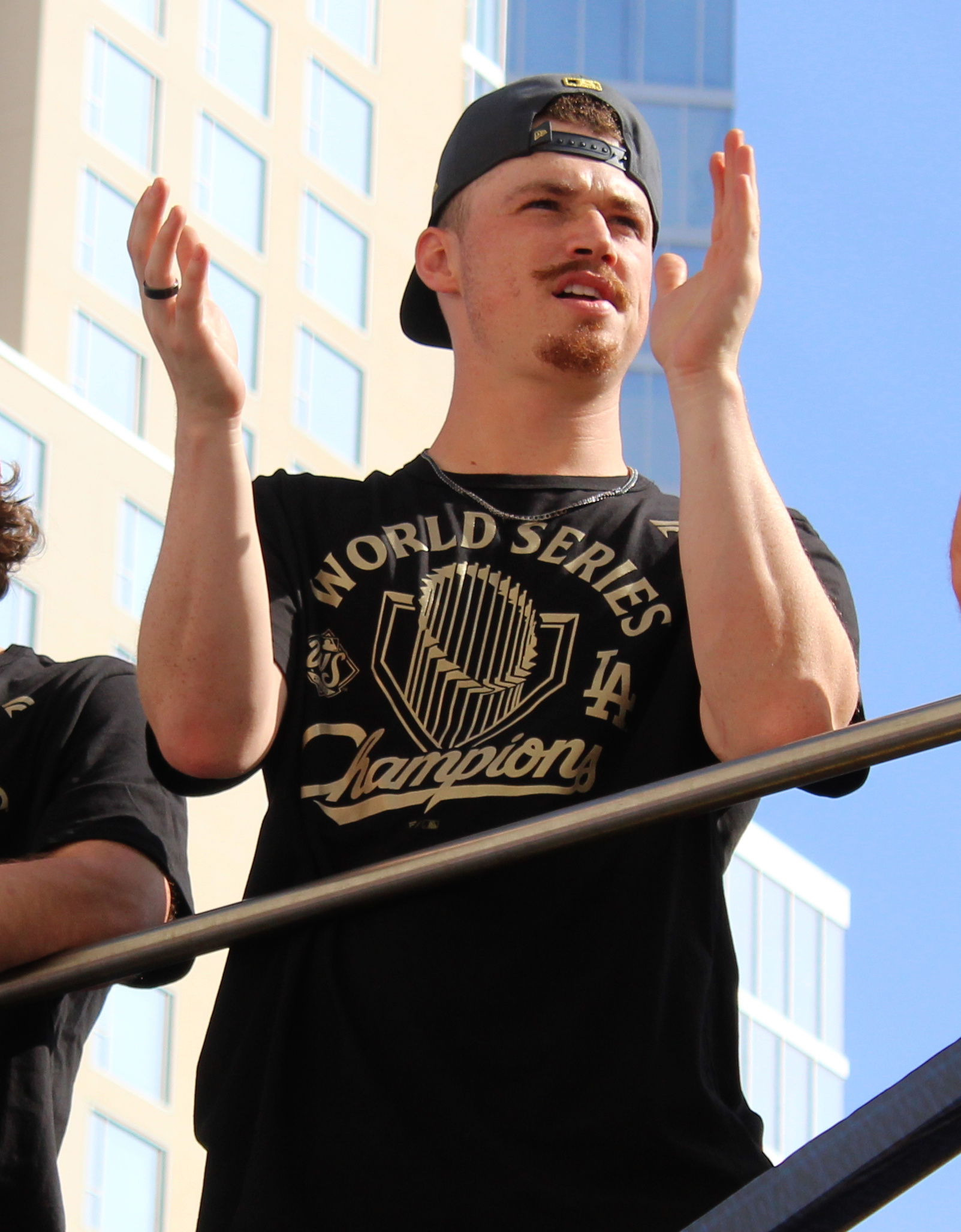
- Dreyer at the 2025 Dodgers parade

Los Angeles Dodgers – No. 86
- Pitcher
- Born: February 27, 1999 (age 27); Salt Lake City, Utah, U.S.
- Bats: Right Throws: Left

MLB debut
- March 19, 2025, for the Los Angeles Dodgers

MLB statistics (through September 27, 2026)
- Win–loss record: 8–4
- Earned run average: 3.06
- Strikeouts: 147
- Stats at Baseball Reference

Teams
- Los Angeles Dodgers (2025–present)

Career highlights and awards
- World Series champion (2025)

Jacob Andrew Dreyer (born February 27, 1999) is an American professional baseball pitcher for the Los Angeles Dodgers of Major League Baseball (MLB). He made his MLB debut in 2025.

== Career ==
=== Amateur career ===
Dreyer attended Johnston High School in Johnston, Iowa, and the University of Iowa, where he played college baseball for the Iowa Hawkeyes. In 2018, he played collegiate summer baseball with the Harwich Mariners of the Cape Cod Baseball League.

=== Los Angeles Dodgers ===
Dreyer was signed as an undrafted free agent by the Los Angeles Dodgers on August 3, 2021. He made his professional debut in 2022 with the rookie-level Arizona Complex League Dodgers, recording a 1.50 ERA with 13 strikeouts in 12 games.

Dreyer spent the 2023 season with the High-A Great Lakes Loons, posting a 5–0 record and 2.30 ERA with 79 strikeouts in 54 2/3 innings pitched across 42 contests. He started 2024 with the Double-A Tulsa Drillers and was promoted to the Triple–A Oklahoma City Dodgers, pitching in 46 games with a cumulative 5–2 record and 2.20 ERA with 72 strikeouts and 4 saves across 57 1/3 innings pitched.

On November 19, 2024, the Dodgers added Dreyer to their 40-man roster to protect him from the Rule 5 draft. He made his MLB debut on March 19, 2025, during the Tokyo Series against the Chicago Cubs, allowing one run on two hits in one inning of work while striking out one batter (Michael Busch). Dreyer picked up his first major league win when he pitched two scoreless innings against the Atlanta Braves on April 2. He pitched in 67 games for the Dodgers (including five games as an opener), with a 3–2 record and 2.95 ERA and four saves while striking out 74 in 76 1/3 innings. Dreyer made his post-season debut in the opening game of the Wild Card Series against the Cincinnati Reds. Coming in to the game with the bases loaded and only one out in the eighth inning, he walked the first batter to score a run, then struck out Tyler Stephenson and retired Ke'Bryan Hayes on a pop up to get out of the inning and preserve the Dodgers lead. He then pitched one scoreless inning in the 2025 NLDS and in the 2025 World Series, he pitched 2 1/3 innings over two games, allowing three hits and a walk but no runs.

In the 2026 season, Dreyer pitched 64 2/3 innings over 67 games, with a 5–2 record, 3.20 ERA, two saves and 73 strikeouts.

== Personal life ==
He is the son of former MLB pitcher Steve Dreyer.

== See also ==
- List of second-generation Major League Baseball players
