= Taylor Rashi =

American baseball player (born 1996)

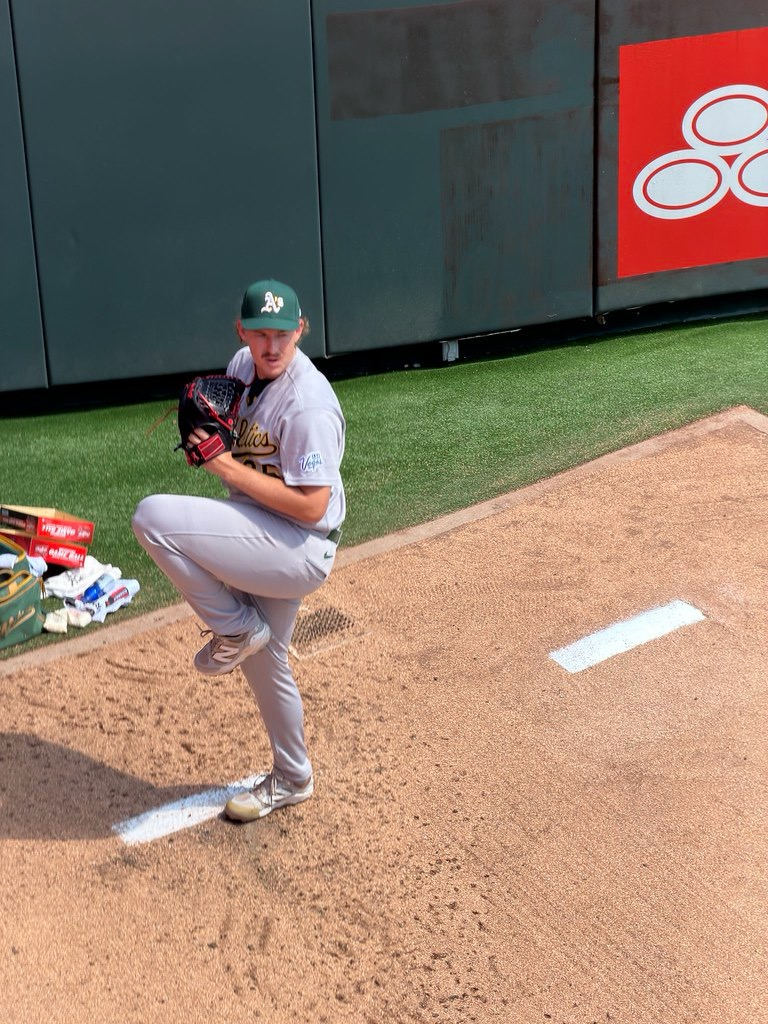
- Rashi with the Athletics in 2026

Free agent
- Pitcher
- Born: January 15, 1996 (age 30); Torrance, California, U.S.
- Bats: Right Throws: Right

MLB debut
- August 28, 2025, for the Arizona Diamondbacks

MLB statistics (through 2026 season)
- Win–loss record: 1–1
- Earned run average: 5.32
- Strikeouts: 27
- Stats at Baseball Reference

Teams
- Arizona Diamondbacks (2025–2026); Athletics (2026)

Taylor Steven Rashi (born January 15, 1996) is an American professional baseball pitcher who is a free agent. He has previously played in Major League Baseball (MLB) for the Arizona Diamondbacks and Athletics.

== Career ==
=== Amateur career ===
Rashi attended West Torrance High School in Torrance, California, and played for their baseball team. He played college baseball at El Camino College and the University of California, Irvine.

=== San Francisco Giants ===
The San Francisco Giants selected Rashi in the 23rd round, 686th overall, of the 2019 MLB draft. He split his first professional season between the rookie-level Arizona League Giants and Low-A Salem-Keizer Volcanoes. Rashi did not play in a game in 2020 due to the cancellation of the minor league season because of the COVID-19 pandemic.

Rashi returned to action in 2021 with the High-A Eugene Emeralds, posting a 6–3 record and 4.44 ERA with 68 strikeouts and two saves across 32 appearances (two starts). He made 30 relief outings for the Double-A Richmond Flying Squirrels in 2022, compiling a 1–3 record and 2.83 ERA with 52 strikeouts and one save over 35 innings of work.

=== Arizona Diamondbacks ===
On December 7, 2022, the Arizona Diamondbacks selected Rashi from the Giants in the minor league phase of the Rule 5 draft. He split the 2023 campaign between the rookie-level Arizona Complex League Diamondbacks and Double-A Amarillo Sod Poodles, accumulating a 3–1 record and 4.40 ERA with 18 strikeouts and one save in 11 appearances (three starts).

Rashi split the 2024 season between Amarillo and the Triple-A Reno Aces. He made 41 relief appearances for the two affiliates, registering a combined 7–3 record and 4.70 ERA with 62 strikeouts and three saves across 51 2/3 innings pitched.

On August 27, 2025, Rashi was selected to the 40-man roster and promoted to the major leagues for the first time. He made his major league debut the next day, earning a save with three innings pitched not allowing a run. Rashi made 10 appearances for the Diamondbacks during his rookie campaign, logging an 0–1 record and 4.41 ERA with 22 strikeouts and two saves across 16 1/3 innings pitched. On November 21, he was non-tendered by Arizona and became a free agent.

On December 5, 2025, Rashi re-signed with the Diamondbacks on a minor league contract. He was assigned to Reno to begin the regular season. On April 3, 2026, the Diamondbacks selected Rashi's contract, adding him to their active roster. On April 5, Rashi recorded his first career win after tossing a scoreless inning of relief against the Atlanta Braves. In three appearances for Arizona, he struggled to a 9.82 ERA with four strikeouts across 3 2/3 innings pitched. Rashi was designated for assignment by the Diamondbacks on June 5.

=== Minnesota Twins ===
On June 8, 2026, the Diamondbacks traded Rashi to the Minnesota Twins in exchange for cash considerations. In 15 appearances for the Triple–A St. Paul Saints, he posted a 2–0 record and 4.76 ERA with 23 strikeouts and two saves over 17 innings of work. Rashi was designated for assignment by Minnesota on August 7.

=== Athletics ===
On August 9, 2026, Rashi was claimed off of waivers by the Athletics. He made one appearance for the team, allowing one run and recording one strikeout across two innings pitched. Rashi was designated for assignment by the Athletics on September 11. He cleared waivers and was sent outright to the Triple–A Las Vegas Aviators on September 13. He elected free agency on November 2.

== See also ==
- Rule 5 draft results
