= 2024 Kansas City Royals season =

2024 Kansas City Royals
- American League Wild Card
- League: American League
- Division: Central
- Ballpark: Kauffman Stadium
- City: Kansas City, Missouri
- Record: 86–76 (.531)
- Divisional place: 2nd
- Owners: John Sherman
- General managers: J.J. Picollo
- Managers: Matt Quatraro
- Television: Bally Sports Kansas City
- Radio: KFNZ 96.5 The Fan

The 2024 Kansas City Royals season was the 56th season for the franchise, and their 52nd at Kauffman Stadium. It was also the team's second season under the management of Matt Quatraro. The season was a major improvement for the Royals; after finishing with only 56 wins and 106 losses in 2023, the second-worst during the Major League Baseball season just behind the Oakland Athletics, the 2024 Royals won their 56th game on July 2, and won 86 games total, 30 more than the previous season. The 2024 Royals were one of only six teams since 1969 to achieve a season-to-season improvement of 30 wins. The Royals made MLB history with the biggest turnaround in two seasons.

On September 14, the Royals secured their first winning record since the World Series-winning 2015 team. On September 27, they clinched a postseason berth for the first time since 2015 when the Minnesota Twins lost to the Baltimore Orioles. They swept the Orioles in the American League Wild Card Series, a rematch of the 2014 American League Championship Series, which the Royals also won in a four-game sweep. They were then defeated by the New York Yankees in the American League Division Series in four games, the first postseason matchup between the two since the 1980 ALCS.

== Offseason ==
The Royals in 2023 finished 56–106, nine games worse than their 65–97 record in 2022.

=== Transactions ===
==== November 2023 ====
November 17	Atlanta Braves traded right-handed pitcher Nick Anderson to Kansas City Royals for cash considerations.
November 30	Royals signed infielder/outfielder Garrett Hampson to a 1-year, $2 million contract.

==== December 2023 ====
December 6	Houston Astros traded right-handed pitcher Carlos Mateo to Kansas City Royals for right-handed pitcher Dylan Coleman.
December 11	Royals signed left-handed pitcher Will Smith to a 1-year, $5 million contract.
December 12	Royals signed right-handed pitcher Seth Lugo to a 2-year, $30 million contract.
December 15	Royals signed right-handed pitcher Chris Stratton to a 1-year, $3.5 million contract.
December 18	Royals signed right-handed pitcher Michael Wacha to a 1-year, $16 million contract. Baltimore Orioles traded right-handed pitcher Cesar Espinal to Kansas City Royals for right-handed pitcher Jonathan Heasley
December 19	Royals signed outfielder Hunter Renfroe to a 1-year contract.

==== January 2024 ====
January 30	Seattle Mariners traded a player to be named later or cash to Kansas City Royals for infielder/outfielder Samad Taylor

==== February 2024 ====
February 5	Royals signed shortstop Bobby Witt Jr. to a 11-year, $288.7 million contract extension

== Regular season ==
=== American League Central ===
AL Central
Team	W	L	Pct.	GB	Home	Road
Cleveland Guardians	92	69	.571	—	50‍–‍30	42‍–‍39
Kansas City Royals	86	76	.531	6½	45‍–‍36	41‍–‍40
Detroit Tigers	86	76	.531	6½	43‍–‍38	43‍–‍38
Minnesota Twins	82	80	.506	10½	43‍–‍38	39‍–‍42
Chicago White Sox	41	121	.253	51½	23‍–‍58	18‍–‍63

=== American League Wild Card ===
Division leaders
Team	W	L	Pct.
New York Yankees	94	68	.580
Cleveland Guardians	92	69	.571
Houston Astros	88	73	.547

Wild Card teams (Top 3 teams qualify for postseason)
Team	W	L	Pct.	GB
Baltimore Orioles	91	71	.562	+5
Kansas City Royals	86	76	.531	—
Detroit Tigers	86	76	.531	—
Seattle Mariners	85	77	.525	1
Minnesota Twins	82	80	.506	4
Boston Red Sox	81	81	.500	5
Tampa Bay Rays	80	82	.494	6
Texas Rangers	78	84	.481	8
Toronto Blue Jays	74	88	.457	12
Oakland Athletics	69	93	.426	17
Los Angeles Angels	63	99	.389	23
Chicago White Sox	41	121	.253	45

=== Record vs. opponents ===
==== Record vs. American League ====
2024 American League record Source: MLB Standings Grid – 2024
Team	BAL	BOS	CWS	CLE	DET	HOU	KC	LAA	MIN	NYY	OAK	SEA	TB	TEX	TOR	NL
Baltimore	—	8–5	6–1	3–4	2–4	2–5	4–2	4–2	6–0	8–5	3–3	4–2	9–4	5–2	7–6	20–26
Boston	5–8	—	4–3	2–5	3–4	2–4	4–2	4–2	3–3	6–7	5–1	4–3	6–7	4–2	8–5	21–25
Chicago	1–6	3–4	—	5–8	3–10	2–4	1–12	4–2	1–12	1–5	3–3	1–6	4–2	0–7	1–5	11–35
Cleveland	4–3	5–2	8–5	—	7–6	1–4	5–8	5–1	10–3	2–4	6–1	4–2	3–4	4–2	4–2	24–22
Detroit	4–2	4–3	10–3	6–7	—	2–4	6–7	3–4	6–7	2–4	3–3	5–1	5–1	3–4	5–2	22–24
Houston	5–2	4–2	4–2	4–1	4–2	—	4–3	9–4	2–4	1–6	8–5	5–8	4–2	7–6	5–2	22–24
Kansas City	2–4	2–4	12–1	8–5	7–6	3–4	—	5–2	6–7	2–5	4–2	3–3	3–3	1–5	5–2	23–23
Los Angeles	2–4	2–4	2–4	1–5	4–3	4–9	2–5	—	1–5	3–3	5–8	8–5	3–4	4–9	0–7	22–24
Minnesota	0–6	3–3	12–1	3–10	7–6	4–2	7–6	5–1	—	0–6	6–1	5–2	3–4	5–2	4–2	18–28
New York	5–8	7–6	5–1	4–2	4–2	6–1	5–2	3–3	6–0	—	5–2	4–3	7–6	3–3	7–6	23–23
Oakland	3–3	1–5	3–3	1–6	3–3	5–8	2–4	8–5	1–6	2–5	—	4–9	3–4	6–7	3–3	24–22
Seattle	2–4	3–4	6–1	2–4	1–5	8–5	3–3	5–8	2–5	3–4	9–4	—	3–3	10–3	2–4	26–20
Tampa Bay	4–9	7–6	2–4	4–3	1–5	2–4	3–3	4–3	4–3	6–7	4–3	3–3	—	1–5	9–4	26–20
Texas	2–5	2–4	7–0	2–4	4–3	6–7	5–1	9–4	2–5	3–3	7–6	3–10	5–1	—	2–4	19–27
Toronto	6–7	5–8	5–1	2–4	2–5	2–5	2–5	7–0	2–4	6–7	3–3	4–2	4–9	4–2	—	20–26

Updated with the results of all games through September 30, 2024.

==== Record vs. National League ====
2024 American League record vs. National League Source: MLB Standings
Team	AZ	ATL	CHC	CIN	COL	LAD	MIA	MIL	NYM	PHI	PIT	SD	SF	STL	WSH
Baltimore	2–1	2–1	0–3	3–0	2–1	1–2	1–2	1–2	1–2	2–1	1–2	1–2	1–2	0–3	2–2
Boston	0–3	1–3	2–1	2–1	1–2	0–3	3–0	1–2	0–3	2–1	3–0	1–2	2–1	1–2	2–1
Chicago	1–2	2–1	0–4	0–3	2–1	0–3	1–2	0–3	0–3	0–3	0–3	0–3	1–2	2–1	2–1
Cleveland	0–3	1–2	3–0	3–1	1–2	1–2	2–1	0–3	3–0	2–1	2–1	1–2	2–1	1–2	2–1
Detroit	2–1	0–3	1–2	3–0	2–1	2–1	1–2	1–2	2–1	1–2	2–2	1–2	1–2	2–1	1–2
Houston	2–1	0–3	0–3	0–3	4–0	2–1	3–0	2–1	2–1	1–2	1–2	1–2	1–2	2–1	1–2
Kansas City	1–2	1–2	1–2	3–0	1–2	1–2	2–1	2–1	1–2	1–2	2–1	1–2	0–3	3–1	3–0
Los Angeles	1–2	1–2	1–2	0–3	1–2	2–2	3–0	1–2	2–1	1–2	2–1	3–0	2–1	1–2	1–2
Minnesota	2–1	0–3	1–2	1–2	2–1	1–2	1–2	1–3	1–2	2–1	1–2	1–2	1–2	1–2	2–1
New York	2–1	1–2	2–1	0–3	2–1	1–2	2–1	2–1	0–4	3–0	1–2	2–1	3–0	1–2	1–2
Oakland	1–2	1–2	2–1	2–1	2–1	1–2	2–1	1–2	2–1	2–1	3–0	0–3	2–2	1–2	2–1
Seattle	2–1	2–1	1–2	3–0	2–1	0–3	1–2	1–2	3–0	2–1	1–2	3–1	2–1	2–1	1–2
Tampa Bay	3–0	1–2	2–1	2–1	2–1	1–2	3–1	1–2	3–0	0–3	2–1	1–2	2–1	1–2	2–1
Texas	2–2	1–2	2–1	2–1	0–3	2–1	2–1	0–3	1–2	0–3	2–1	1–2	1–2	1–2	2–1
Toronto	1–2	1–2	1–2	1–2	2–1	1–2	0–3	1–2	1–2	1–3	2–1	2–1	2–1	3–0	1–2

Updated with the results of all games through September 30, 2024.

=== Game log ===
Legend
Royals Win	Royals Loss	Game postponed	Clinched playoff spot

2024 Game Log: 86–76 (Home: 45–36; Away: 41–40)
March/April: 18–13 (Home: 12–5; Away: 6–8)

#	Date	Opponent	Score	Win	Loss	Save	Attendance	Record	Streak
1	March 28	Twins	1–4	López (1–0)	Ragans (0–1)	Jax (1)	38,775	0–1	L1
2	March 30	Twins	1–5	Jax (1–0)	Smith (0–1)	—	19,461	0–2	L2
3	March 31	Twins	11–0	Singer (1–0)	Ober (0–1)	—	13,005	1–2	W1
4	April 1	@ Orioles	4–6	Kimbrel (1–0)	Anderson (0–1)	—	12,666	1–3	L1
5	April 2	@ Orioles	4–1	Marsh (1–0)	Irvin (0–1)	Smith (1)	9,404	2–3	W1
6	April 3	@ Orioles	3–4	Canó (1–0)	Smith (0–2)	—	11,488	2–4	L1
7	April 4	White Sox	10–1	Lugo (1–0)	Soroka (0–1)	—	10,863	3–4	W1
8	April 5	White Sox	2–1	Stratton (1–0)	Kopech (0–1)	McArthur (1)	10,592	4–4	W2
9	April 6	White Sox	3–0	Wacha (1–0)	Flexen (0–2)	Stratton (1)	15,453	5–4	W3
10	April 7	White Sox	5–3	Schreiber (1–0)	García (0–1)	McArthur (2)	14,251	6–4	W4
11	April 9	Astros	4–3 (10)	McArthur (1–0)	Suero (0–1)	—	11,926	7–4	W5
12	April 10	Astros	11–2	Lugo (2–0)	Arrighetti (0–1)	—	10,536	8–4	W6
13	April 11	Astros	13–3	Singer (2–0)	Brown (0–2)	—	10,280	9–4	W7
14	April 12	@ Mets	1–6	Severino (1–1)	Wacha (1–1)	—	18,822	9–5	L1
15	April 13	@ Mets	11–7	Marsh (2–0)	Manaea (1–1)	—	25,387	10–5	W1
16	April 14	@ Mets	1–2	Raley (1–0)	Stratton (1–1)	Díaz (3)	32,749	10–6	L1
17	April 15	@ White Sox	2–0	Lugo (3–0)	Nastrini (0–1)	McArthur (3)	10,569	11–6	W1
—	April 16	@ White Sox	Postponed (rain); Makeup: April 17						
18	April 17 (1)	@ White Sox	4–2	Anderson (1–1)	Kopech (0–2)	McArthur (4)	see 2nd game	12–6	W2
19	April 17 (2)	@ White Sox	1–2	Fedde (1–0)	Wacha (1–2)	García (1)	10,412	12–7	L1
20	April 19	Orioles	9–4	Marsh (3–0)	Kremer (0–2)	—	17,073	13–7	W1
21	April 20	Orioles	7–9	Burnes (3–0)	Ragans (0–2)	Kimbrel (5)	23,118	13–8	L1
22	April 21	Orioles	0–5	Irvin (1–1)	Lugo (3–1)	—	18,044	13–9	L2
23	April 22	Blue Jays	3–5	Kikuchi (2–1)	Singer (2–1)	Romano (3)	10,004	13–10	L3
24	April 23	Blue Jays	3–2	Stratton (2–1)	Gausman (0–3)	McArthur (5)	11,357	14–10	W1
25	April 24	Blue Jays	3–2	Schreiber (2–0)	Rodríguez (0–1)	McArthur (6)	10,282	15–10	W2
26	April 25	Blue Jays	2–1 (5)	Ragans (1–2)	Berríos (4–1)	—	9,740	16–10	W3
27	April 26	@ Tigers	8–0	Lugo (4–1)	Olson (0–4)	—	17,251	17–10	W4
28	April 27	@ Tigers	5–6	Faedo (2–1)	Stratton (2–2)	Foley (8)	22,734	17–11	L1
29	April 28	@ Tigers	1–4	Skubal (4–0)	Wacha (1–3)	Foley (9)	18,794	17–12	L2
30	April 29	@ Blue Jays	5–6	Cabrera (1–0)	Bowlan (0–1)	Pearson (1)	29,879	17–13	L3
31	April 30	@ Blue Jays	4–1	Ragans (2–2)	Berríos (4–2)	McArthur (7)	27,189	18–13	W1

May: 17–11 (Home: 9–4; Away: 8–7)

#	Date	Opponent	Score	Win	Loss	Save	Attendance	Record	Streak
32	May 1	@ Blue Jays	6–1	Lugo (5–1)	Bassitt (2–5)	—	32,307	19–13	W2
33	May 3	Rangers	7–1	Schreiber (3–0)	Winn (0–1)	—	25,690	20–13	W3
34	May 4	Rangers	4–15	Sborz (1–0)	Wacha (1–4)	—	26,002	20–14	L1
35	May 5	Rangers	2–3 (10)	Yates (3–0)	McArthur (1–1)	Robertson (1)	20,613	20–15	L2
36	May 6	Brewers	3–2	Anderson (2–1)	Koenig (2–1)	Stratton (2)	10,005	21–15	W1
37	May 7	Brewers	5–6	Koenig (3–1)	McArthur (1–2)	Megill (3)	14,657	21–16	L1
38	May 8	Brewers	6–4	Singer (3–1)	Ross (1–4)	McArthur (8)	22,430	22–16	W1
39	May 9	@ Angels	10–4	Wacha (2–4)	Detmers (3–4)	—	23,568	23–16	W2
40	May 10	@ Angels	2–1	Duffey (1–0)	Estévez (0–2)	Schreiber (1)	29,126	24–16	W3
41	May 11	@ Angels	3–9	Anderson (3–4)	Ragans (2–3)	—	31,593	24–17	L1
42	May 12	@ Angels	4–2	Lugo (6–1)	Sandoval (2–6)	McArthur (9)	27,723	25–17	W1
43	May 13	@ Mariners	2–6	Kirby (4–3)	Singer (3–2)	Muñoz (6)	14,984	25–18	L1
44	May 14	@ Mariners	4–2	Wacha (3–4)	Gilbert (3–2)	McArthur (10)	20,665	26–18	W1
45	May 15	@ Mariners	2–4	Woo (1–0)	Marsh (3–1)	Muñoz (7)	22,233	26–19	L1
46	May 17	Athletics	6–2	Ragans (3–3)	Spence (3–2)	—	24,585	27–19	W1
47	May 18	Athletics	5–3	Lugo (7–1)	Stripling (1–8)	McArthur (11)	22,014	28–19	W2
48	May 19	Athletics	8–4	Singer (4–2)	Sears (3–3)	—	20,035	29–19	W3
49	May 20	Tigers	8–3	Wacha (4–4)	Olson (0–5)	Stratton (3)	12,986	30–19	W4
50	May 21	Tigers	10–3	Marsh (4–1)	Mize (1–3)	—	14,031	31–19	W5
51	May 22	Tigers	8–3	Ragans (4–3)	Skubal (6–1)	—	15,004	32–19	W6
52	May 24	@ Rays	8–1	Lugo (8–1)	Alexander (2–3)	—	16,368	33–19	W7
53	May 25	@ Rays	7–4 (11)	McArthur (2–2)	Lovelady (0–3)	Anderson (1)	20,309	34–19	W8
54	May 26	@ Rays	1–4	Cleavinger (4–0)	Wacha (4–5)	Fairbanks (5)	20,789	34–20	L1
55	May 27	@ Twins	5–6	Ryan (4–3)	Marsh (4–2)	Durán (7)	17,508	34–21	L2
56	May 28	@ Twins	2–4	Woods Richardson (2–0)	Ragans (4–4)	Durán (8)	15,174	34–22	L2
57	May 29	@ Twins	6–1	Lugo (9–1)	Ober (5–3)	—	18,130	35–22	W1
58	May 30	@ Twins	6–7	Thielbar (2–1)	Stratton (2–3)	Durán (9)	22,542	35–23	L1
59	May 31	Padres	8–11	Matsui (3–0)	Schreiber (3–1)	Suárez (17)	30,006	35–24	L2

June: 12–15 (Home: 9–7; Away: 3–8)

#	Date	Opponent	Score	Win	Loss	Save	Attendance	Record	Streak
60	June 1	Padres	3–7	Vásquez (1–3)	Marsh (4–3)	—	25,266	35–25	L3
61	June 2	Padres	4–3	Klein (1–0)	Matsui (3–1)	—	21,825	36–25	W1
62	June 4	@ Guardians	5–8	Smith (3–0)	Long (0–1)	Clase (19)	23,260	36–26	L1
—	June 5	@ Guardians	Postponed (rain); Makeup: August 26						
63	June 6	@ Guardians	4–3	Long (1–1)	Gaddis (3–2)	McArthur (12)	26,344	37–26	W1
64	June 7	Mariners	10–9	Anderson (3–1)	Stanek (3–1)	—	25,178	38–26	W2
65	June 8	Mariners	8–4	Marsh (5–3)	Castillo (5–7)	—	18,351	39–26	W3
66	June 9	Mariners	5–6 (10)	Baumann (3–0)	McArthur (2–3)	Saucedo (3)	20,926	39–27	L1
67	June 10	Yankees	2–4	Rodón (9–2)	Lugo (9–2)	Tonkin (1)	24,038	39–28	L2
68	June 11	Yankees	1–10	Stroman (6–2)	Singer (4–3)	—	22,437	39–29	L3
69	June 12	Yankees	5–11	Poteet (3–0)	Altavilla (0–1)	—	25,132	39–30	L4
70	June 13	Yankees	4–3	McArthur (3–3)	Holmes (1–2)	—	21,875	40–30	W1
71	June 14	@ Dodgers	3–4	Hudson (3–1)	Smith (0–3)	Vesia (3)	49,580	40–31	L1
72	June 15	@ Dodgers	7–2	Lugo (10–2)	Treinen (2–1)	—	50,423	41–31	W1
73	June 16	@ Dodgers	0–3	Glasnow (7–5)	Singer (4–3)	Phillips (10)	52,789	41–32	L1
74	June 18	@ Athletics	5–7	Harris (1–0)	Marsh (5–4)	Miller (13)	7,013	41–33	L2
75	June 19	@ Athletics	1–5	Medina (1–2)	Ragans (4–5)	—	4,557	41–34	L3
76	June 20	@ Athletics	3–2	McArthur (4–3)	Nittoli (0–1)	Stratton (4)	8,753	42–34	W1
77	June 21	@ Rangers	2–6	Eovaldi (4–3)	Schreiber (3–2)	—	37,678	42–35	L1
78	June 22	@ Rangers	0–6	Gray (3–3)	Wacha (4–6)	—	38,301	42–36	L2
79	June 23	@ Rangers	0–4	Scherzer (1–0)	Marsh (5–5)	Ureña (1)	35,762	42–37	L3
80	June 24	Marlins	4–1	Ragans (5–5)	Muñoz (1–3)	McArthur (13)	16,817	43–37	W1
81	June 25	Marlins	1–2	Puk (2–8)	Hernández (0–1)	Scott (10)	16,119	43–38	L1
82	June 26	Marlins	5–1	Zerpa (1–0)	Brazobán (0–1)	—	14,132	44–38	W1
83	June 27	Guardians	2–1	Long (2–1)	Lively (7–4)	McArthur (14)	23,340	45–38	W2
84	June 28	Guardians	10–3	Marsh (6–5)	McKenzie (3–5)	—	20,691	46–38	W3
85	June 29	Guardians	2–7	Bibee (7–2)	Ragans (5–6)	—	24,153	46–39	L1
86	June 30	Guardians	6–2	Lugo (11–2)	Allen (8–4)	—	27,691	47–39	W1

July: 13–10 (Home: 6–6; Away: 7–4)

#	Date	Opponent	Score	Win	Loss	Save	Attendance	Record	Streak
87	July 2	Rays	1–5	Littell (3–5)	Singer (4–5)	—	16,865	47–40	L1
88	July 3	Rays	4–2	Wacha (5–6)	Pepiot (4–5)	McArthur (15)	23,268	48–40	W1
89	July 4	Rays	8–10	Eflin (5–5)	Marsh (6–6)	Fairbanks (14)	28,358	48–41	L1
90	July 5	@ Rockies	2–4	Vodnik (2–1)	Schreiber (3–3)	Beeks (8)	48,321	48–42	L2
91	July 6	@ Rockies	1–3	Gomber (2–5)	Lugo (11–3)	Vodnik (1)	33,748	48–43	L3
92	July 7	@ Rockies	10–1	Singer (5–5)	Gordon (0–1)	—	32,180	49–43	W1
—	July 9	@ Cardinals	Postponed (rain); Makeup: July 10						
93	July 10 (1)	@ Cardinals	6–4	Marsh (7–6)	Pallante (4–4)	McArthur (16)	32,108	50–43	W2
94	July 10 (2)	@ Cardinals	8–5	Wacha (6–6)	Graceffo (0–1)	McArthur (17)	37,898	51–43	W3
95	July 12	@ Red Sox	6–1	Ragans (6–6)	Criswell (3–4)	—	34,894	52–43	W4
96	July 13	@ Red Sox	0–5	Crawford (6–7)	Lugo (11–4)	—	32,378	52–44	L1
97	July 14	@ Red Sox	4–5	Bello (10–5)	Singer (5–6)	Jansen (19)	35,351	52–45	L2
94th All-Star Game in Arlington, Texas
98	July 19	White Sox	7–1	Wacha (7–6)	Flexen (2–9)	—	26,693	53–45	W1
99	July 20	White Sox	6–1	Singer (6–6)	Cannon (1–4)	—	27,545	54–45	W2
100	July 21	White Sox	4–1	Lugo (12–4)	Brebbia (0–5)	—	22,226	55–45	W3
101	July 22	Diamondbacks	10–4	Ragans (7–6)	Díaz (1–1)	—	16,275	56–45	W4
102	July 23	Diamondbacks	2–6	Montgomery (7–5)	Marsh (7–7)	—	21,993	56–46	L1
103	July 24	Diamondbacks	6–8	Mantiply (4–2)	McArthur (4–4)	—	15,931	56–47	L2
104	July 26	Cubs	6–0	Singer (7–6)	Hendricks (2–9)	—	36,351	57–47	W1
105	July 27	Cubs	4–9	Imanaga (9–2)	Lugo (12–5)	—	31,784	57–48	L1
106	July 28	Cubs	3–7	Assad (5–3)	Ragans (7–7)	—	24,839	57–49	L2
107	July 29	@ White Sox	8–5	Stratton (3–3)	Brebbia (0–6)	McArthur (18)	12,179	58–49	W1
108	July 30	@ White Sox	4–3	Wacha (8–6)	Ellard (0–1)	Long (1)	15,360	59–49	W2
109	July 31	@ White Sox	10–3	Singer (8–6)	Thorpe (3–3)	—	14,112	60–49	W3

August: 15–13 (Home: 5–6; Away: 10–7)

#	Date	Opponent	Score	Win	Loss	Save	Attendance	Record	Streak
110	August 1	@ Tigers	7–1	Lugo (13–5)	Montero (1–5)	—	15,743	61–49	W4
111	August 2	@ Tigers	9–2	Ragans (8–7)	Skubal (12–4)	—	21,035	62–49	W5
112	August 3	@ Tigers	5–6 (11)	Foley (3–3)	McArthur (4–5)	—	35,210	62–50	L1
113	August 4	@ Tigers	3–2	Stratton (4–3)	Miller (5–7)	Harvey (1)	25,990	63–50	W1
114	August 5	Red Sox	5–9	Paxton (9–3)	Singer (8–7)	—	20,087	63–51	L1
115	August 6	Red Sox	5–6	Bernardino (4–3)	Lugo (13–6)	Jansen (21)	21,386	63–52	L2
116	August 7	Red Sox	8–4	Ragans (9–7)	Crawford (7–9)	—	16,550	64–52	W1
117	August 9	Cardinals	5–8	Liberatore (3–3)	Smith (0–4)	Helsley (37)	34,066	64–53	L1
118	August 10	Cardinals	8–3	Wacha (9–6)	Fernandez (1–4)	Erceg (4)	36,799	65–53	W1
119	August 12	@ Twins	3–8	López (11–8)	Singer (8–8)	—	22,173	65–54	L1
120	August 13	@ Twins	3–13	Matthews (1–0)	Lugo (13–7)	—	25,885	65–55	L2
121	August 14	@ Twins	4–1	Ragans (10–7)	Varland (0–5)	Erceg (5)	27,560	66–55	W1
122	August 16	@ Reds	7–1	Lorenzen (6–6)	Martinez (6–6)	—	32,500	67–55	W2
123	August 17	@ Reds	13–1	Wacha (10–6)	Lodolo (9–5)	—	35,430	68–55	W3
124	August 18	@ Reds	8–1	Singer (9–8)	Abbott (10–10)	—	30,388	69–55	W4
125	August 19	Angels	5–3	Lugo (14–7)	Fulmer (0–4)	Schreiber (2)	15,091	70–55	W5
126	August 20	Angels	5–9	Anderson (10–11)	Ragans (10–8)	—	16,310	70–56	L1
127	August 21	Angels	3–0	Lorenzen (7–6)	Cueto (0–1)	Erceg (6)	13,009	71–56	W1
128	August 23	Phillies	7–4	Wacha (11–6)	Walker (3–5)	Erceg (7)	25,491	72–56	W2
129	August 24	Phillies	2–11	Suárez (11–5)	Singer (9–9)	—	27,002	72–57	L1
130	August 25	Phillies	3–11	Allard (2–0)	Lugo (14–8)	—	18,193	72–58	L2
131	August 26 (1)	@ Guardians	4–3	Schreiber (4–3)	Gaddis (4–3)	Erceg (8)	17,738	73–58	W1
132	August 26 (2)	@ Guardians	9–4	Long (3–1)	Allen (8–5)	Lynch IV (1)	16,856	74–58	W2
133	August 27	@ Guardians	6–1	McArthur (5–5)	Williams (2–7)	—	19,820	75–58	W3
134	August 28	@ Guardians	5–7	Morgan (2–0)	Erceg (2–4)	Clase (39)	19,722	75–59	L1
135	August 29	@ Astros	3–6	Pressly (1–3)	Erceg (2–5)	Hader (29)	32,070	75–60	L2
136	August 30	@ Astros	2–3	Hader (7–7)	McArthur (5–6)	—	37,279	75–61	L3
137	August 31	@ Astros	2–5	Kikuchi (7–9)	Ragans (10–9)	Pressly (3)	37,776	75–62	L4

September: 11–14 (Home: 4–8; Away: 7–6)

#	Date	Opponent	Score	Win	Loss	Save	Attendance	Record	Streak
138	September 1	@ Astros	2–7	Blanco (10–6)	Marsh (7–8)	—	40,229	75–63	L5
139	September 2	Guardians	2–4	Williams (3–7)	Wacha (11–7)	Clase (41)	30,612	75–64	L6
140	September 3	Guardians	1–7	Bibee (11–6)	Singer (9–10)	—	14,813	75–65	L7
141	September 4	Guardians	4–1	Lugo (15–8)	Lively (11–9)	Erceg (9)	14,094	76–65	W1
142	September 6	Twins	5–0	Ragans (11–9)	Matthews (1–3)	—	19,484	77–65	W2
143	September 7	Twins	4–2	Lynch IV (1–0)	Durán (6–9)	Erceg (10)	29,160	78–65	W3
144	September 8	Twins	2–0	Wacha (12–7)	Woods Richardson (5–4)	Erceg (11)	26,477	79–65	W4
145	September 9	@ Yankees	4–10	Cousins (2–1)	McArthur (5–7)	—	35,308	79–66	L1
146	September 10	@ Yankees	5–0	Lugo (16–8)	Stroman (10–8)	—	34,485	80–66	W1
147	September 11	@ Yankees	3–4 (11)	Weaver (5–3)	Bubic (0–1)	—	40,080	80–67	L1
148	September 13	@ Pirates	8–3	Marsh (8–8)	Ortiz (6–6)	—	24,748	81–67	W1
149	September 14	@ Pirates	5–1	Wacha (13–7)	Keller (11–10)	—	15,439	82–67	W2
150	September 15	@ Pirates	3–4	Mlodzinski (3–5)	Singer (9–11)	Chapman (9)	20,078	82–68	L1
151	September 16	Tigers	6–7	Hanifee (1–1)	Long (3–2)	Foley (24)	18,920	82–69	L2
152	September 17	Tigers	1–3 (10)	Holton (7–1)	Erceg (2–6)	Foley (25)	21,086	82–70	L3
153	September 18	Tigers	2–4	Skubal (17–4)	Marsh (8–9)	Vest (2)	16,279	82–71	L4
154	September 20	Giants	1–2	Black (1–4)	Wacha (13–8)	Doval (23)	22,117	82–72	L5
155	September 21	Giants	0–9	Roupp (1–1)	Singer (9–12)	—	24,189	82–73	L6
156	September 22	Giants	0–2	Snell (5–3)	Lugo (16–9)	Walker (9)	24,189	82–74	L7
157	September 24	@ Nationals	1–0 (10)	Zerpa (2–0)	Finnegan (3–7)	Erceg (12)	14,477	83–74	W1
158	September 25	@ Nationals	3–0	Lynch IV (2–0)	Herz (4–9)	Erceg (13)	16,670	84–74	W2
159	September 26	@ Nationals	7–4	Bubic (1–1)	Finnegan (3–8)	Erceg (14)	14,357	85–74	W3
160	September 27*	@ Braves	0–3	Fried (11–10)	Singer (9–13)	Iglesias (33)	36,212	85–75	L1
161	September 28	@ Braves	1–2	Iglesias (6–2)	Long (3–3)	—	38,775	85–76	L2
162	September 29	@ Braves	4–2	Marsh (9–9)	Morton (8–10)	Bubic (1)	39,043	86–76	W1
* Despite losing to Atlanta on September 27, the Royals clinched a playoff berth on this day by virtue of a Minnesota loss.

== Postseason ==
=== Game log ===
2024 Game Log: 3–3 (Home 0–2, Road 3–1)
AL Wild Card Series: 2–0 (Home 0–0, Road 2–0)

#	Date	Opponent	Score	Win	Loss	Save	Attendance	Series
1	October 1	@ Orioles	1–0	Ragans (1–0)	Burnes (0–1)	Erceg (1)	41,506	1–0
2	October 2	@ Orioles	2–1	Zerpa (1–0)	Pérez (0–1)	Erceg (2)	38,698	2–0

AL Division Series: 1–3 (Home 0–2, Road 1–1)

#	Date	Opponent	Score	Win	Loss	Save	Attendance	Series
1	October 5	@ Yankees	5–6	Holmes (1–0)	Lorenzen (0–1)	Weaver (1)	48,790	0–1
2	October 7	@ Yankees	4–2	Zerpa (2–0)	Rodón (0–1)	Erceg (3)	48,034	1–1
3	October 9	Yankees	2–3	Kahnle (1–0)	Bubic (0–1)	Weaver (2)	40,312	1–2
4	October 10	Yankees	1–3	Cole (1–0)	Wacha (0–1)	Weaver (3)	39,012	1–3

=== Postseason rosters ===
Playoff rosters
American League Wild Card Series

- Pitchers: 24 Michael Lorenzen 41 Daniel Lynch IV 46 John Schreiber 50 Kris Bubic 51 Brady Singer 52 Michael Wacha 55 Cole Ragans 60 Lucas Erceg 61 Ángel Zerpa 67 Seth Lugo 73 Sam Long
- Catchers: 13 Salvador Pérez 34 Freddy Fermín
- Infielders: 2 Garrett Hampson 7 Bobby Witt Jr. 9 Vinnie Pasquantino 11 Maikel García 15 Paul DeJong 18 Yuli Gurriel 19 Michael Massey 26 Adam Frazier
- Outfielders: 1 MJ Melendez 16 Hunter Renfroe 22 Tommy Pham 28 Kyle Isbel 44 Dairon Blanco

American League Division Series

- Pitchers: 24 Michael Lorenzen 41 Daniel Lynch IV 46 John Schreiber 50 Kris Bubic 51 Brady Singer 52 Michael Wacha 55 Cole Ragans 60 Lucas Erceg 61 Ángel Zerpa 67 Seth Lugo 73 Sam Long
- Catchers: 13 Salvador Pérez 34 Freddy Fermín
- Infielders: 2 Garrett Hampson 7 Bobby Witt Jr. 9 Vinnie Pasquantino 11 Maikel García 15 Paul DeJong 18 Yuli Gurriel 19 Michael Massey 26 Adam Frazier
- Outfielders: 1 MJ Melendez 16 Hunter Renfroe 22 Tommy Pham 28 Kyle Isbel 44 Dairon Blanco

== Roster ==
2024 Kansas City Royals
Roster
Pitchers: 54 Dan Altavilla; 63 Nick Anderson; 62 Jonathan Bowlan; 50 Kris Bubic; 64 Steven Cruz; 21 Tyler Duffey; 60 Lucas Erceg; 56 Hunter Harvey; 43 Carlos Hernández; 36 Will Klein; 73 Sam Long; 24 Michael Lorenzen; 67 Seth Lugo; 24 Jordan Lyles; 41 Daniel Lynch IV; 48 Alec Marsh; 66 James McArthur; 65 Walter Pennington; 32 Nick Pratto; 55 Cole Ragans; 65 Matt Sauer; 46 John Schreiber; 60 Colin Selby; 51 Brady Singer; 31 Will Smith; 35 Chris Stratton; 69 Anthony Veneziano; 52 Michael Wacha; 61 Ángel Zerpa	Catchers: 34 Freddy Fermín; 13 Salvador Pérez; Infielders: 40 CJ Alexander; 15 Paul DeJong; 26 Adam Frazier; 11 Maikel García; 18 Yuli Gurriel; 12 Nick Loftin; 19 Michael Massey; 9 Vinnie Pasquantino; 7 Bobby Witt Jr.	Outfielders: 44 Dairon Blanco; 27 Tyler Gentry; 8 Robbie Grossman; 2 Garrett Hampson; 28 Kyle Isbel; 1 MJ Melendez; 22 Tommy Pham; 16 Hunter Renfroe; 17 Nelson Velázquez; 6 Drew Waters	Manager: 33 Matt Quatraro; Coaches: 68 José Alguacil (infield); 84 Zach Bove (assistant pitching); 80 Allan de San Miguel (bullpen catcher); -- Joe Dillon (assistant hitting); 80 Ryan Eigsti (bullpen catcher); 39 Damon Hollins (first base); 26 Paul Hoover (bench); 18 Rusty Kuntz (coach); 70 Parker Morin (bullpen catcher); 57 Mitch Stetter (bullpen); 85 Brian Sweeney (pitching); 25 Vance Wilson (third base); 31 Alec Zumwalt (hitting)

== Player stats ==
= Indicates team leader

= Indicates league leader

=== Batting ===
Note: G = Games played; AB = At bats; R = Runs scored; H = Hits; 2B = Doubles; 3B = Triples; HR = Home runs; RBI = Runs batted in; SB = Stolen bases; BB = Walks; AVG = Batting average; SLG = Slugging average

Player	G	AB	R	H	2B	3B	HR	RBI	SB	BB	AVG	SLG
Bobby Witt Jr.	161	636	125	211	45	11	32	109	31	57	.332	.588
Salvador Pérez	158	590	58	160	28	0	27	104	0	44	.271	.456
Maikel García	157	575	84	131	27	5	7	58	37	42	.231	.332
Vinnie Pasquantino	131	496	64	130	30	2	19	97	1	40	.262	.446
MJ Melendez	135	412	44	85	23	3	17	44	4	35	.206	.400
Hunter Renfroe	120	385	44	88	18	0	15	52	1	36	.229	.392
Kyle Isbel	136	384	62	88	13	8	8	42	11	27	.229	.367
Freddy Fermín	111	339	40	92	14	0	6	36	2	23	.271	.366
Michael Massey	100	332	45	86	17	2	14	45	1	15	.259	.449
Adam Frazier	104	262	35	53	10	1	4	22	3	22	.202	.294
Garrett Hampson	113	213	16	49	13	1	0	16	7	14	.230	.300
Nelson Velázquez	64	205	31	41	8	1	8	27	2	19	.200	.366
Nick Loftin	56	148	15	28	4	0	1	14	1	19	.189	.236
Dairon Blanco	88	120	37	31	4	0	4	13	31	8	.258	.392
Paul DeJong	37	108	15	24	3	0	6	15	0	9	.222	.417
Tommy Pham	23	101	9	23	3	1	2	8	1	3	.228	.337
Yuli Gurriel	18	54	7	13	3	0	0	6	1	9	.241	.296
Robbie Grossman	16	32	2	4	0	0	0	2	0	5	.125	.125
Drew Waters	7	16	2	3	1	0	0	1	0	2	.188	.250
CJ Alexander	4	8	0	1	0	0	0	0	0	0	.125	.125
Tyler Gentry	3	5	0	0	0	0	0	0	0	0	.000	.000
Team totals	162	5421	735	1343	264	35	170	711	134	429	.248	.403

Source:Baseball Reference

=== Pitching ===
Note: W = Wins; L = Losses; ERA = Earned run average; G = Games pitched; GS = Games started; SV = Saves; IP = Innings pitched; Hits = Hits allowed; R = Runs allowed; ER = Earned runs allowed; BB = Walks allowed; SO = Strikeouts

Player	W	L	ERA	G	GS	SV	IP	H	R	ER	BB	SO
Seth Lugo	16	9	3.00	33	33	0	206.2	177	75	69	48	181
Cole Ragans	11	9	3.14	32	32	0	186.1	146	71	65	67	223
Brady Singer	9	13	3.71	32	32	0	179.2	175	77	74	54	170
Michael Wacha	13	8	3.35	29	29	0	166.2	154	65	62	45	145
Alec Marsh	9	9	4.53	26	25	0	129.0	123	70	65	39	123
Chris Stratton	4	3	5.55	57	0	4	58.1	53	38	36	33	44
James McArthur	5	7	4.92	57	0	18	56.2	68	36	31	14	49
Ángel Zerpa	2	0	3.86	60	0	0	53.2	59	24	23	19	49
John Schreiber	4	3	3.66	59	0	2	51.2	48	23	21	20	46
Daniel Lynch IV	2	0	3.32	16	3	1	43.1	29	17	16	14	39
Sam Long	3	3	3.16	43	0	1	42.2	34	17	15	17	44
Will Smith	0	4	6.53	45	0	1	41.1	45	31	30	15	29
Nick Anderson	3	1	4.04	37	0	1	35.2	35	17	16	15	29
Kris Bubic	1	1	2.67	27	0	1	30.1	26	12	9	5	39
Carlos Hernández	0	1	3.30	27	0	0	30.0	24	14	11	16	27
Michael Lorenzen	2	0	1.57	7	6	0	28.2	19	6	5	12	22
Lucas Erceg	0	3	2.88	23	0	11	25.0	18	9	8	3	31
Matt Sauer	0	0	7.71	14	0	0	16.1	23	14	14	11	9
Tyler Duffey	1	0	5.00	9	0	0	9.0	7	5	5	8	10
Hunter Harvey	0	0	6.35	6	0	1	5.2	8	4	4	4	5
Will Klein	1	0	6.35	5	0	0	5.2	10	4	4	2	6
Steven Cruz	0	0	0.00	5	0	0	5.2	1	0	0	0	4
Jordan Lyles	0	0	0.00	5	0	0	5.0	2	0	0	2	3
Dan Altavilla	0	1	14.73	5	1	0	3.2	5	6	6	3	5
Colin Selby	0	0	6.00	2	0	0	3.0	2	3	2	2	0
Jonathan Bowlan	0	1	13.50	1	1	0	2.2	6	4	4	3	3
Anthony Veneziano	0	0	4.50	2	0	0	2.0	4	2	1	1	2
Nick Pratto	0	0	0.00	1	0	0	1.0	1	0	0	0	1
Garrett Hampson	0	0	0.00	1	0	0	1.0	0	0	0	0	0
Nick Loftin	0	0	0.00	1	0	0	1.0	1	0	0	0	0
Walter Pennington	0	0	0.00	1	0	0	0.2	0	0	0	0	1
Team totals	86	76	3.76	162	162	41	1428.0	1303	644	596	472	1339

Source:Baseball Reference

== Farm system ==
Level	Team	League	Manager
Triple-A	Omaha Storm Chasers	International League	Mike Jirschele
Double-A	Northwest Arkansas Naturals	Texas League	Brooks Conrad
High-A	Quad Cities River Bandits	Midwest League	Jesus Azuaje
Single-A	Columbia Fireflies	Carolina League	David Noworyta
Rookie	ACL Royals Blue	Arizona Complex League	Larry Sutton
Rookie	ACL Royals Gold	Arizona Complex League	Larry Sutton
Rookie	DSL Royals	Dominican Summer League	Sergio De Luna
