= Alec Marsh =

American baseball player (born 1998)

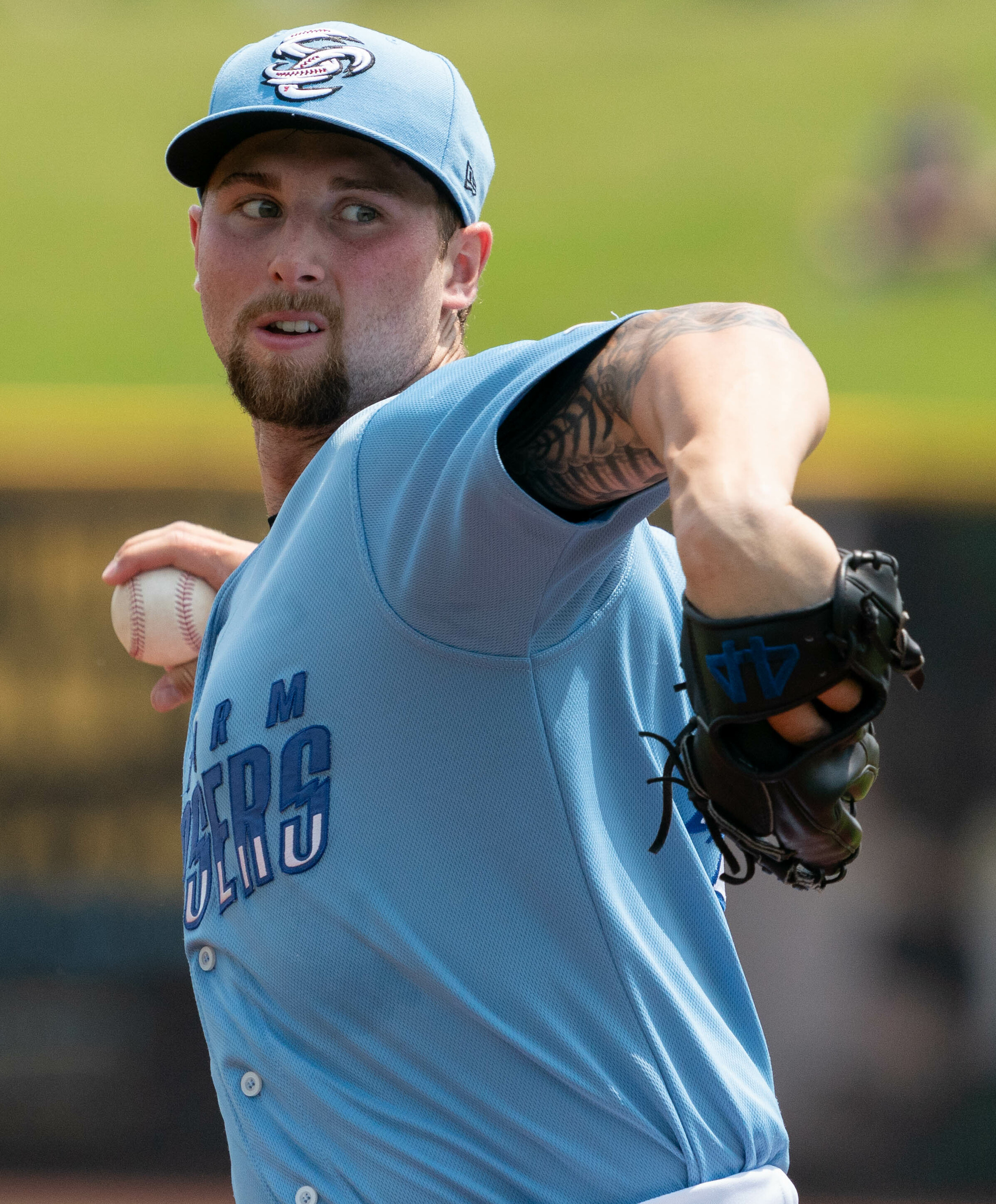
- Marsh with the Omaha Storm Chasers in 2023

Chicago White Sox
- Pitcher
- Born: May 14, 1998 (age 28); Milwaukee, Wisconsin, U.S.
- Bats: Right Throws: Right

MLB debut
- June 30, 2023, for the Kansas City Royals

MLB statistics (through 2024 season)
- Win–loss record: 12–18
- Earned run average: 4.96
- Strikeouts: 208
- Stats at Baseball Reference

Teams
- Kansas City Royals (2023–2024)

Alec Tylar Michael Marsh (born May 14, 1998) is an American professional baseball pitcher in the Chicago White Sox organization. He made his Major League Baseball (MLB) debut in 2023, for the Kansas City Royals.

== Amateur career ==
Marsh was born May 14, 1998, in Milwaukee, Wisconsin, and he was raised in the Bay View neighborhood by his mother Sheri and stepfather Jordan. Marsh attended Ronald Wilson Reagan College Preparatory High School.

Marsh played college baseball for the Arizona State Sun Devils for three seasons. As a freshman, he appeared in 11 games with one start and had an 8.14 ERA. In 2018, he played collegiate summer baseball with the Yarmouth–Dennis Red Sox of the Cape Cod Baseball League. Marsh became a starter during his sophomore season and went 3–3 with a 3.89 ERA. He was named first team All-Pac-12 Conference after going 9–4 over 17 starts with a 3.46 ERA on the mound and 99 strikeouts in 101 1/3 innings pitched.

== Professional career ==
=== Kansas City Royals ===
Marsh was selected in the Competitive Balance section of second round of the 2019 Major League Baseball draft by the Kansas City Royals. He signed with the team he was assigned to the Idaho Falls Chukars of the Pioneer League, where he started 13 games and posted a 4.05 ERA in 33 1/3 innings pitched. After the 2020 minor league season was canceled, Marsh played in the temporary independent Constellation Energy League for the Eastern Reyes del Tigre. Marsh was named to the Royals' 2021 Spring Training roster as a non-roster invitee. He was assigned to the Northwest Arkansas Naturals, but pitched only 25 1/3 innings due to injury. In 2022 in the minor leagues he was 2–16 with a 6.88 ERA in 27 starts, and led the minor leagues in losses. On November 15, 2022, the Royals selected Marsh to their 40-man roster to protect him from the Rule 5 draft.

Marsh was assigned to Double-A Northwest Arkansas to begin the 2023 season. In 14 starts split between Northwest Arkansas and the Triple–A Omaha Storm Chasers, Marsh registered a cumulative 5–3 record and 4.62 ERA with 75 strikeouts in 62 1/3 innings pitched. On June 30, 2023, Marsh was promoted to the major leagues for the first time. In 17 games (8 starts) during his rookie campaign, he logged a 3–9 record and 5.69 ERA with 85 strikeouts across 74 1/3 innings pitched.

On March 21, 2024, manager Matt Quatraro announced that Marsh would be the Royals' fifth starter to begin the season. His first start of the 2024 season came on April 2 against the Baltimore Orioles. Marsh picked up the win and pitched seven innings, allowed one run, struck out five, and allowed only three baserunners on two hits and one walk in the 4-1 Royals win. He had a strong start to the season, going 3-0 and posting a 2.70 ERA and a 1.01 WHIP with 17 strikeouts and one home run allowed in April across five starts and 26 2/3 innings. While playing the Toronto Blue Jays on April 24, Marsh took a line drive to the forearm off the bat of Addison Barger. He fielded the ball and threw Barger out at first, but had to leave the game, completing only 4 1/3 innings in what was a scoreless start. The Royals placed Marsh on the injured list (IL), and Marsh did not pitch again until May 10 against the Los Angeles Angels. Marsh was not as effective in May, going 1-2 with a 3.86 ERA and a 1.11 WHIP with 26 strikeouts and four home runs allowed across four starts and 23 1/3 innings pitched.

Marsh began the 2025 season batting shoulder tightness in spring training, an issue which caused him to begin the year on the injured list. He was transferred to the 60-day injured list on May 2, 2025. He did not appear in a game in 2025. Marsh underwent labrum surgery on November 3, ruling him out for the majority of the 2026 season.

On October 23, 2026, Marsh was removed from the 40–man roster and sent outright to Triple–A Omaha, but he chose instead to become a free agent.

=== Chicago White Sox ===
On November 5, 2026, Marsh signed a minor league contract with the Chicago White Sox that included an invitation to spring training.
