= Cole Ragans =

American baseball player (born 1997)

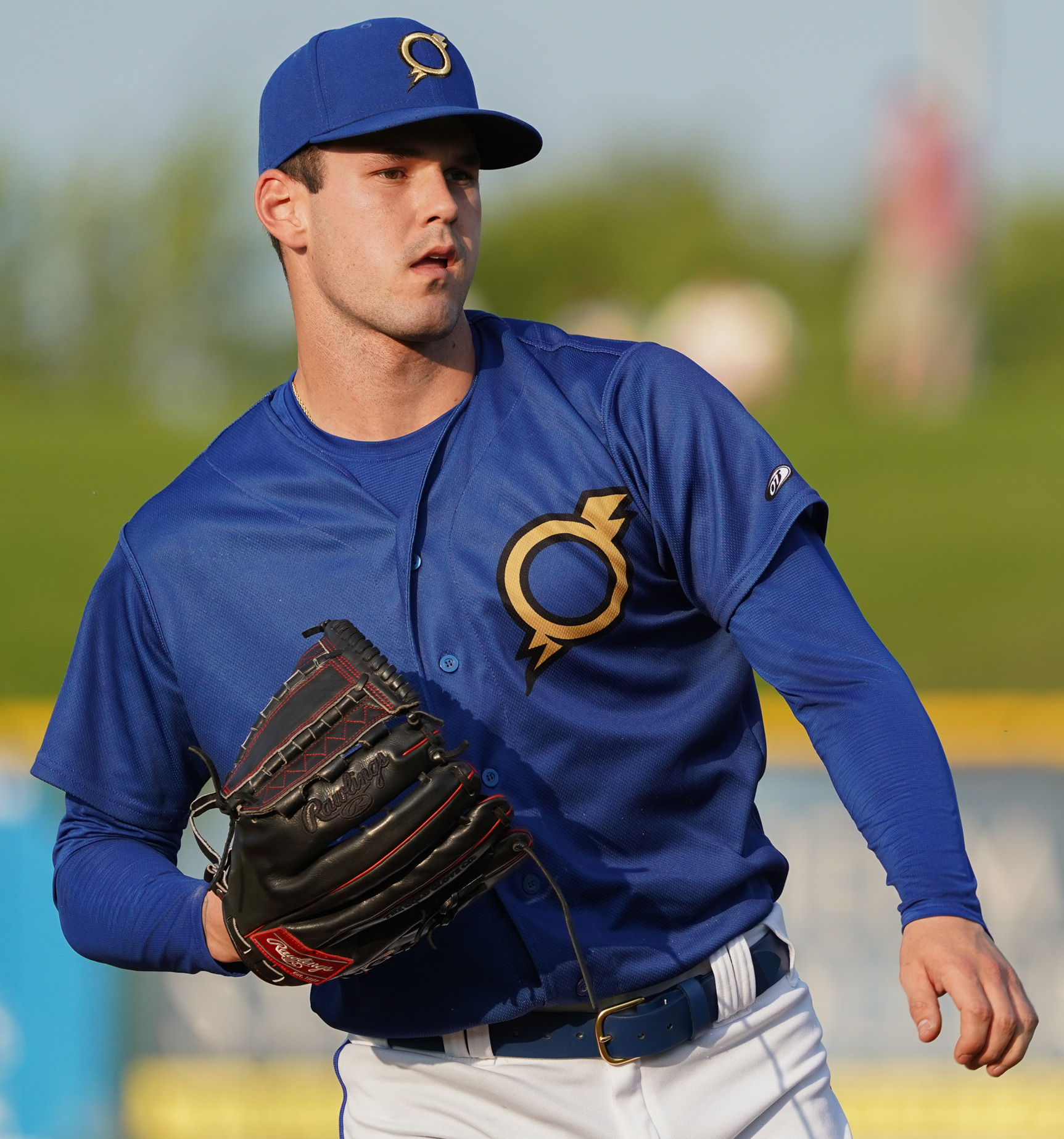
- Ragans with the Omaha Storm Chasers in 2023

Kansas City Royals – No. 55
- Pitcher
- Born: December 12, 1997 (age 28); Gainesville, Florida, U.S.
- Bats: Left Throws: Left

MLB debut
- August 4, 2022, for the Texas Rangers

MLB statistics (through 2026 season)
- Win–loss record: 22–24
- Earned run average: 3.76
- Strikeouts: 506
- Stats at Baseball Reference

Teams
- Texas Rangers (2022–2023); Kansas City Royals (2023–present)

Career highlights and awards
- All-Star (2024)

Cole Gatlin Ragans (born December 12, 1997) is an American professional baseball pitcher for the Kansas City Royals of Major League Baseball (MLB). He has previously played in MLB for the Texas Rangers.

== Amateur career ==
Ragans attended North Florida Christian High School in Tallahassee, Florida. In his senior season, Ragans went 9–0 with a 0.90 ERA and 104 strikeouts over 70 innings. He committed to play college baseball for the Florida State Seminoles.

== Professional career ==
=== Texas Rangers ===
Ragans was drafted by the Texas Rangers, with the 30th overall selection, in the first round of the 2016 Major League Baseball draft. He signed with Texas for a $2,003,400 signing bonus.

After signing, Ragans was assigned to the AZL Rangers of the Rookie-level Arizona League, posting a 4.70 ERA in 7 2/3 innings. He spent 2017 with the Spokane Indians of the Low-A Northwest League, where he pitched to a 3–2 record and a 3.61 ERA along with 87 strikeouts in 57 1/3 innings.

Ragans underwent Tommy John surgery in March 2018 and missed all of the 2018 season. On May 14, 2019, the Rangers announced that Ragans had suffered a tear in the graft of his surgically repaired left elbow during his rehabilitation process. The tear resulted in a second Tommy John procedure which resulted in him missing the entire 2019 season. Ragans did not play in 2020 due to the cancellation of the Minor League Baseball season because of the COVID-19 pandemic. Ragans opened the 2021 season with the Hickory Crawdads of the High-A East. In June 2021, Ragans was selected to play in the All-Star Futures Game. Ragans was promoted to the Frisco RoughRiders of the Double-A Central on July 18, after going 1–2 with a 3.25 ERA and 54 strikeouts over 44 1/3 innings for Hickory. He finished 2021 after posting a 3–1 record with a 5.70 ERA and 33 strikeouts over 36 1/3 innings for Frisco. Ragans returned to Frisco to open the 2022 season, going 5–3 with a 2.81 ERA and 65 strikeouts over 51 1/3 innings, before being promoted to the Round Rock Express of the Triple-A Pacific Coast League on June 14. Over 8 starts for Round Rock, Ragans went 3–2 with a 3.32 ERA and 48 strikeouts over 43 1/3 innings. He was named the Texas Rangers 2022 Nolan Ryan Pitcher of the Year.

On August 4, 2022, Texas selected Ragans' contract and promoted him to the active roster for the first time. In his MLB debut that night versus the Chicago White Sox, Ragans allowed one unearned run over five innings while recording three strikeouts. Over 9 game for Texas, Ragans went 0–3 with a 4.96 ERA and 27 strikeouts over 40 innings in 2022. He went 2-3 with a 5.92 ERA in 17 appearances with the Rangers in 2023.

=== Kansas City Royals ===
On June 30, 2023, the Rangers traded Ragans and minor league outfielder Roni Cabrera to the Kansas City Royals in exchange for Aroldis Chapman. After joining the Royals and moving from the bullpen, where he had made all of his 2023 appearances with Texas, to the starting rotation, Ragans saw increased success across his first 47 innings with Kansas City. He received the AL Pitcher of the Month Award for his performance in the month of August.

In 2024, after posting a 3.28 ERA in 19 starts, Ragans was selected to his first All-Star Game. On September 6, in a game against the Minnesota Twins, Ragans became the fifth pitcher in Royals history (after Zack Greinke in 2009, Kevin Appier in 1996, Dennis Leonard in 1977, and Bob Johnson in 1970) to strike out 200 batters in a single season.

On February 14, 2025, Ragans signed a three-year, $13.25 million contract with the Royals covering his final pre-arbitration year and his first two arbitration years. Ragans will earn $1.25 million in 2025, $4.5 million in 2026, and $7.5 million in 2027. In his first 10 starts for the Royals, he logged a 2-3 record and 5.18 ERA with 76 strikeouts. On June 11, Ragans was placed on the injured list with a rotator cuff strain; he was transferred to the 60-day injured list on July 8. He was activated on September 17.

Ragans made eight starts for Kansas City in 2026, compiling a 1–4 record and 4.84 ERA with 45 strikeouts across 35 1/3 innings pitched. On July 2, 2026, Ragans underwent surgery to repair the ulnar collateral ligament in his pitching elbow, ending his season.
