= Rosemont High School =

Location
- 9594 Kiefer Boulevard; Sacramento, California; United States; 38.54355°N 121.34129°W

Information
- Type: Public
- Established: 2003
- School district: Sacramento City Unified School District
- Principal: Mitchell Jones
- Teaching staff: 75.67 (FTE)
- Grades: 9 to 12
- Enrollment: 1,485 (2024-2025)
- Student to teacher ratio: 19.62
- Colors: Blue and Gold
- Nickname: Wolverines
- Website: RHS website

Rosemont High School is a public high school located in Sacramento, California, USA. Designed by DLR Group, its completed buildings opened in 2003. Rosemont H.S. is part of the Sacramento City Unified School District.

== Athletics ==
Rosemont fields teams in the following sports: baseball, men's basketball, women's basketball, cross country running, American football, boys' and girls' golf, boys' and girls' soccer, softball, swimming, boys' and girls' tennis, track and field, volleyball, water polo, and wrestling.

== Notable alumni ==
- Jacob Fatu (born 1992), WWE professional wrestler
- Sam Long (born 1995), professional baseball player
- Solo Sikoa (born 1993), WWE professional wrestler
