= James McArthur (baseball) =

American baseball player (born 1996)

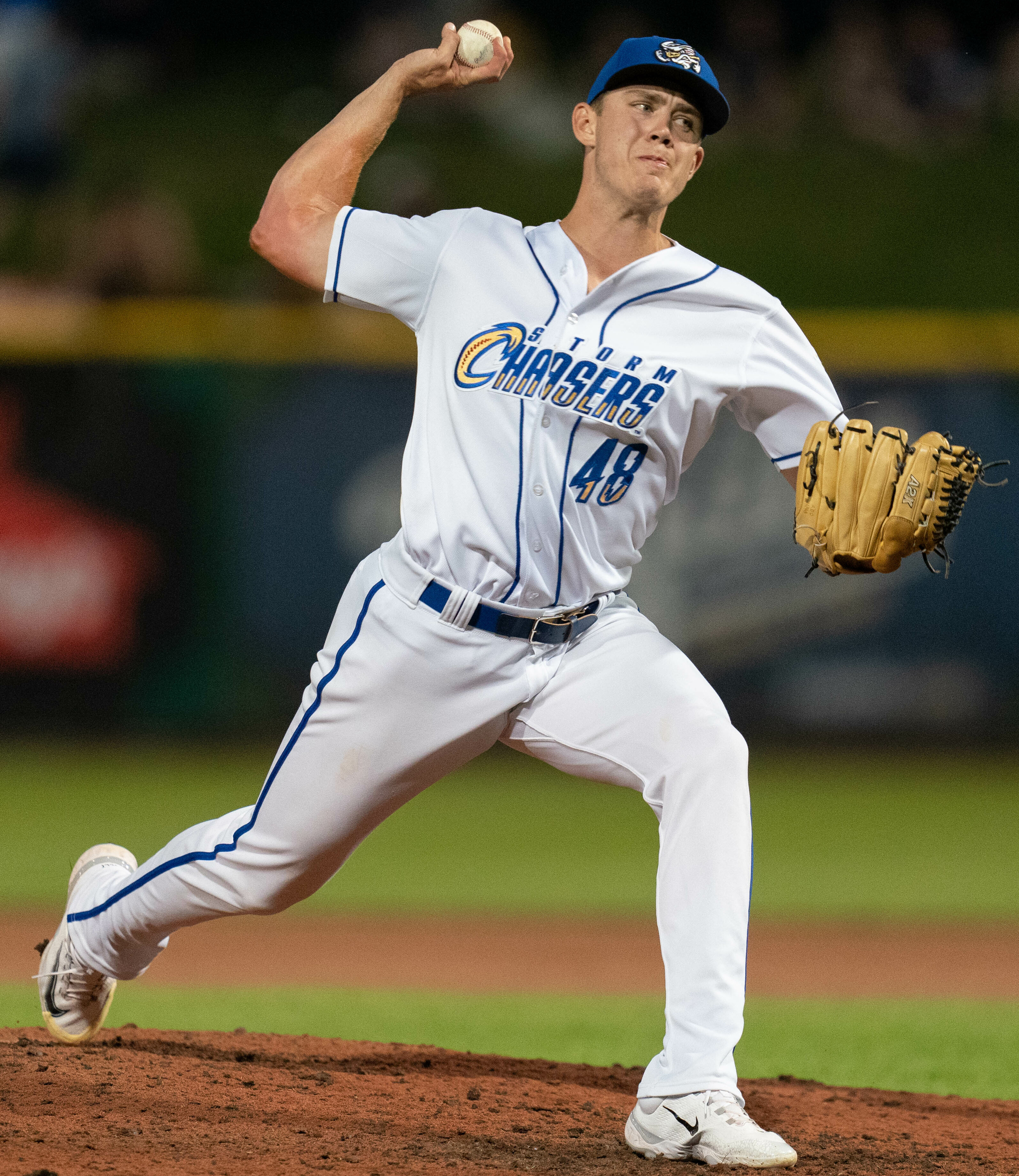
- McArthur with the Omaha Storm Chasers in 2023

Seattle Mariners – No. 52
- Pitcher
- Born: December 11, 1996 (age 29); New Braunfels, Texas, U.S.
- Bats: Right Throws: Right

MLB debut
- June 28, 2023, for the Kansas City Royals

MLB statistics (through 2024 season)
- Win–loss record: 6–7
- Earned run average: 4.84
- Strikeouts: 73
- Saves: 22
- Stats at Baseball Reference

Teams
- Kansas City Royals (2023–2024)

James Leonard McArthur (born December 11, 1996) is an American professional baseball pitcher for the Seattle Mariners of Major League Baseball (MLB). He made his MLB debut in 2023 with the Kansas City Royals.

== Career ==
=== Amateur career ===
McArthur attended New Braunfels High School in New Braunfels, Texas, playing baseball and basketball. He was named a 2015 honorable mention All-American by Perfect Game. He then played college baseball for the Ole Miss Rebels. He was named a freshman All-American by Collegiate Baseball. In 2017, he played collegiate summer baseball with the Falmouth Commodores of the Cape Cod Baseball League.

=== Philadelphia Phillies ===
The Philadelphia Phillies selected McArthur in the 12th round, with the 347th overall selection, of the 2018 Major League Baseball draft. He spent his first professional season split between the rookie-level Gulf Coast League Phillies, Low-A Williamsport Crosscutters, and Single-A Lakewood BlueClaws. In 10 total appearances, he registered an 0.54 ERA with 35 strikeouts across 33 1/3 innings pitched.

McArthur split the 2019 season between Lakewood and the High-A Clearwater Threshers. He appeared in 25 contests (13 starts) and logged a 3–7 record and 4.95 ERA with 91 strikeouts in 83 2/3 innings of work. McArthur did not play in a game in 2020 due to the cancellation of the minor league season because of the COVID-19 pandemic. He returned to action in 2021 for the Double-A Reading Fightin Phils. In 19 games for Reading, and one start for the High-A Jersey Shore BlueClaws, McArthur posted a 4.25 ERA with 83 strikeouts and 1 save in 78 1/3 innings pitched.

On November 19, 2021, the Phillies added McArthur to their 40-man roster to protect him from the Rule 5 draft. He was assigned to Double-A Reading to begin the 2022 season. In 13 starts, he went 2–6 with a 5.05 ERA and 65 strikeouts in 57.0 innings of work. On June 29, 2022, McArthur was placed on the 60-day injured list after suffering a stress fracture in his right elbow, and missed the remainder of the season.

McArthur was optioned to the Triple-A Lehigh Valley IronPigs to begin the 2023 season. He made 5 appearances (4 starts) for Lehigh Valley, posting an 0–2 record and 7.31 ERA with 15 strikeouts in 16.0 innings pitched. On May 4, 2023, McArthur was designated for assignment following the promotion of Jeff Hoffman.

=== Kansas City Royals ===
On May 8, 2023, McArthur was traded to the Kansas City Royals in exchange for Junior Marin and cash considerations. In 12 games for the Triple-A Omaha Storm Chasers, McArthur registered a 4.87 ERA with 31 strikeouts in 20 1/3 innings pitched. On June 24, he was promoted to the major leagues for the first time. He made his major league debut against the Cleveland Guardians on June 28, allowing seven runs on six hits and one walk in an inning pitched. He was optioned back to Triple-A the next day. McArthur was recalled three further times during the season, recording four saves and two holds in the final weeks of the season as the Royals were eliminated from postseason contention. A starter throughout his career, McArthur was used primarily as a reliever by the Royals. He made 18 MLB appearances in 2023, including two appearances as an opener, with a 4.63 ERA, 23 strikeouts, and two walks in 23 1/3 innings.

McArthur began the 2024 season in the majors and recorded his first save on April 5, when he entered in the middle of the 9th inning to replace incumbent closer Will Smith. The Royals then used McArthur as their closer, recording seven saves in April. On July 11, he earned saves in both games of a doubleheader. He made 57 relief appearances for Kansas City, with a 5–7 record and 4.92 ERA with 49 strikeouts and 18 saves across 56 2/3 innings pitched. He also had seven blown saves, losing the closer's role to Lucas Erceg. Following the season, McArthur underwent surgery to repair a fractured olecranon in his right elbow.

McArthur began the 2025 season in the injured list as he recovered from elbow surgery. On May 1, he was transferred to the 60-day injured list. He missed the entire season. On April 19, 2026, McArthur returned to the 60-day injured list due to inflammation in his elbow. He made four minor league appearances in September.

=== Seattle Mariners ===
The Royals traded McArthur, Maikel García, and L.P. Langevin to the Seattle Mariners for Bryce Miller, José A. Ferrer, and Logan Evans on November 18, 2026.

== Personal life ==
McArthur is married and has two children. His father was a pitcher in the Baltimore Orioles minor league system for four years. He has three siblings.
