= Matt Quatraro =

American baseball manager (born 1973)

Kansas City Royals – No. 33
- Manager / Coach
- Born: November 14, 1973 (age 52); Selkirk, New York, U.S.
- Bats: Right Throws: Right

MLB statistics (through 2026 season)
- Managerial record: 293–355
- Winning %: .452
- Stats at Baseball Reference
- Managerial record at Baseball Reference

Teams
- As manager: Kansas City Royals (2023–present); As coach: Cleveland Indians (2014–2017); Tampa Bay Rays (2018–2022)

Matthew John Quatraro (/kwɑːˈtrɛəroʊ/ kwah-TRAIR-oh; born November 14, 1973) is an American professional coach, who is the current manager of the Kansas City Royals of Major League Baseball (MLB). He was previously a coach for the Cleveland Indians from 2014 to 2017 and the Tampa Bay Rays from 2018 to 2022.

Quatraro played college baseball for the Old Dominion Monarchs baseball team from 1993 through 1996, where he was named an All-American. Quatraro played in the minors from 1996 through 2003, without reaching the majors. While primarily a catcher, he also spent significant time at first base and left field, and occasionally played right field and third base.

Quatraro began coaching in 2004, and was enshrined in the Old Dominion University Sports Hall of Fame that year. He was the assistant hitting coach for MLB's Cleveland Indians from 2014 through 2017, and served as the Rays' third base coach in 2018.

In 2024, Quatraro finished second to Cleveland Guardians manager Stephen Vogt in American League Manager of the Year voting. He led the Royals to an 86–76 record, 30 more wins than the previous season.

== Playing career ==
Quatraro attended Bethlehem Central High School in Delmar, New York, graduating in 1992. He then enrolled at Old Dominion University. He played college baseball for the Old Dominion Monarchs baseball team in the Colonial Athletic Association (CAA). As a sophomore in 1994, Quatraro won the CAA Tournament Most Valuable Player Award and was named to the CAA's second-team as a first baseman. In 1994 and 1995, Quatraro played collegiate summer baseball with the Harwich Mariners of the Cape Cod Baseball League. He was named to the CAA's first-team as a catcher in 1995 and 1996, his junior and senior seasons. Quatraro, who hit .400 for his entire career at ODU was also named first team CoSIDA Academic All-American in 1996 As a senior, he was named a second team All-American by the American Baseball Coaches Association and a third team All-American by Collegiate Baseball.

The Tampa Bay Devil Rays selected Quatraro in the eighth round of the 1996 Major League Baseball draft. Though he reached Class AAA, the highest level in Minor League Baseball, Quatraro did not play in the major leagues. The Devil Rays released Quatraro after the 2002 season. He signed with the New York Yankees organization for the 2003 season, but the Yankees released him during spring training. As a player, Quatraro had a career .286 batting average, 23 home runs, and 202 runs batted in in 415 games played in Minor League Baseball, without reaching the majors.

== Coaching and managing career ==
=== Minor league coaching and managing career ===
After retiring as a player, Quatraro worked as a manager and catching instructor in the Devil Rays' minor league system. He served as the hitting coach of the Hudson Valley Renegades of the Low-A New York–Penn League in the 2004 and 2005 seasons, and managed the Renegades in 2006 and 2007. He managed the Columbus Catfish of the Single-A South Atlantic League (SAL) in 2008, and the Bowling Green Hot Rods, also in the SAL, in 2009.

Quatraro also served as an assistant coach for the University at Albany Great Danes baseball team from 2004 through 2008.

From 2010 through 2013, Quatraro was the minor league hitting coordinator for the Tampa Bay Rays.

=== MLB coaching career ===
==== Cleveland Indians ====
The Cleveland Indians hired Quatraro to their major league staff as their assistant hitting coach for the 2014 season.

==== Tampa Bay Rays ====
The Rays hired him as their third base coach after the 2017 season. When Charlie Montoyo was hired as manager of the Toronto Blue Jays after the 2018 season, the Rays promoted Quatraro to bench coach. After the 2021 season, he interviewed with the Oakland Athletics and New York Mets for their open managerial positions.

=== MLB managing career ===
On October 30, 2022, the Kansas City Royals hired Quatraro as their manager. In his first season with the team, the Royals went 56–106 (.346), second worst in the MLB only to the Oakland Athletics, whose record in the 2023 season was 50–112 (.309). The 2023 Royals tied the 2005 Royals squad for the lowest winning percentage, most losses, and fewest wins in a season in franchise history.

Quatraro's second season started much better than his first. He led the Royals to a 31-19 (.620) record through the first 50 games of the season, tying the 1976 Royals for the best start through the first 50 games of a season in franchise history. The Royals concluded the regular season with an 86–76 record (.531), securing the second American League (AL) Wild Card spot and finishing second in the AL Central, 6.5 games behind the 92–69 (.571) Cleveland Guardians. After finishing 5.0 games back of the top-seeded 91–71 Baltimore Orioles (.562) in the Wild Card standings, Kansas City swept them 2–0 in the Wild Card Series, marking the franchise's first postseason game and series wins since the 2015 World Series. Their run ended in the American League Division Series, where they fell 3–1 to the eventual American League champion New York Yankees.

In Matt Quatraro's third season as manager, the Royals regressed slightly from their 2024 form, finishing 82–80 (.506). They placed third in the AL Central, 6.0 games behind the division-leading 88–74 (.543) Cleveland Guardians and 5.0 games back of the 87–75 (.537) Detroit Tigers, who secured the final Wild Card berth. This left Kansas City fifth in the Wild Card standings, 5.0 games behind the Houston Astros, who finished as the American League's highest-ranked non-playoff team after losing a tiebreaker to Detroit.

On January 4, 2026, Quatraro and the Royals agreed to a three-year contract extension running through the 2029 season.

== Managerial record ==
As of September 27, 2026

Team	Year	Regular season					Postseason			
Team	Year	Games	Won	Lost	Win %	Finish	Won	Lost	Win %	Result
KC	2023	162	56	106	.346	5th in AL Central	–	–	–	
KC	2024	162	86	76	.531	2nd in AL Central	3	3	.500	Lost ALDS (NYY)
KC	2025	162	82	80	.506	3rd in AL Central	–	–	–	
KC	2026	162	69	93	.426	5th in AL Central	–	–	–	
Total		648	293	355	.452		3	3	.500	

== Personal life ==
Quatraro is of Italian descent. In 2004, he was inducted into the Old Dominion University Sports Hall of Fame. Quatraro graduated from Old Dominion with a History degree.

Sporting positions
Preceded by Position Created	Cleveland Indians assistant hitting coach 2014–2017	Succeeded by Vic Rodriguez
Preceded by Charlie Montoyo	Tampa Bay Rays third base coach 2018	Succeeded by Rodney Linares
Preceded by Charlie Montoyo	Tampa Bay Rays bench coach 2019–2022	Succeeded by Rodney Linares
Preceded by Mike Matheny	Kansas City Royals manager 2023–present	Succeeded by Incumbent
