= Nick Loftin =

American baseball player (born 1998)

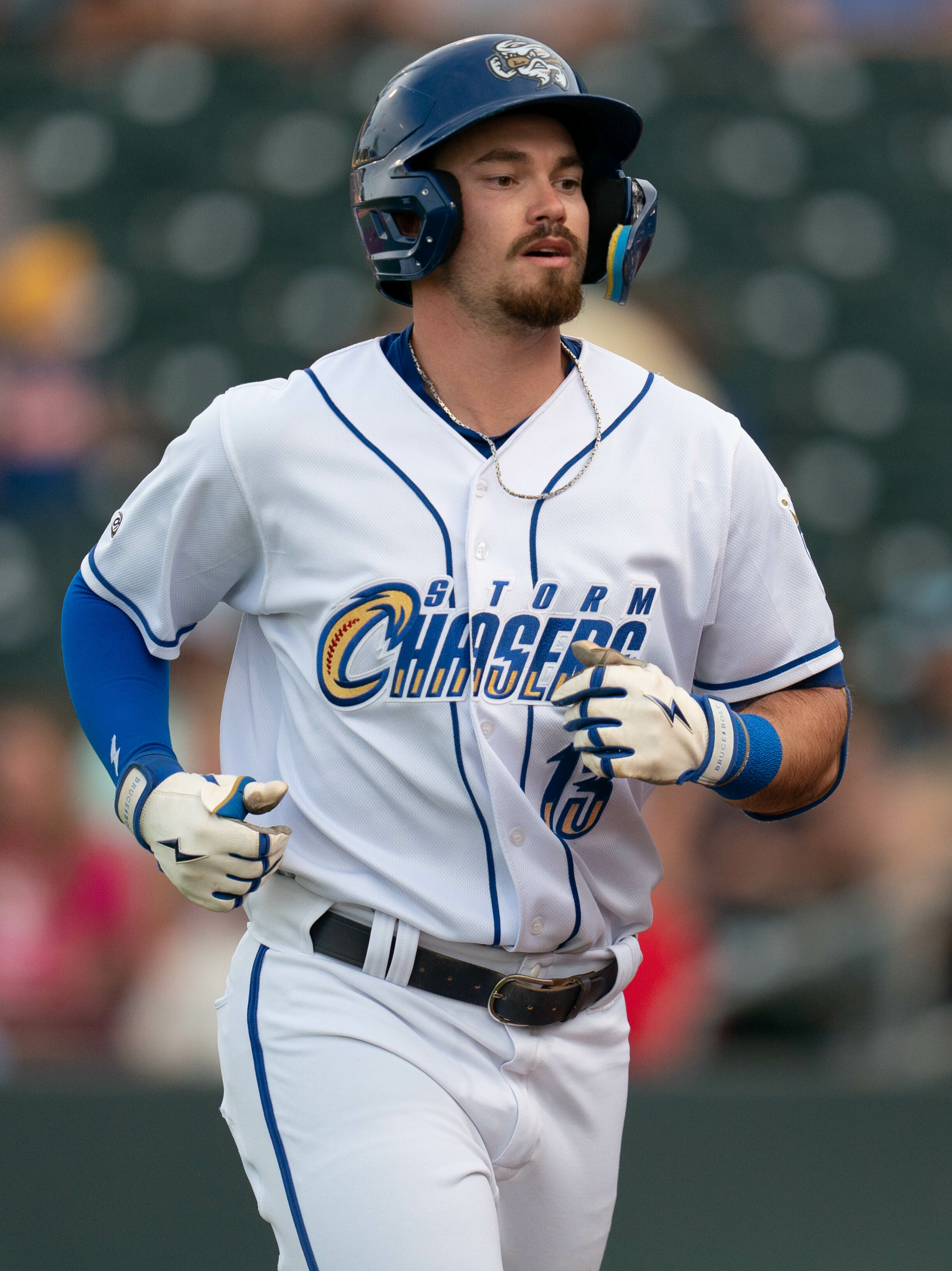
- Loftin with the Omaha Storm Chasers in 2023

Kansas City Royals – No. 12
- Infielder / Left fielder
- Born: September 25, 1998 (age 28); Corpus Christi, Texas, U.S.
- Bats: Right Throws: Right

MLB debut
- September 1, 2023, for the Kansas City Royals

MLB statistics (through 2026 season)
- Batting average: .230
- Home runs: 13
- Runs batted in: 89
- Stats at Baseball Reference

Teams
- Kansas City Royals (2023–present)

Nicholas James Loftin (born September 25, 1998) is an American professional baseball infielder and left fielder for the Kansas City Royals of Major League Baseball (MLB). He made his MLB debut in 2023.

== Amateur career ==
Loftin attended W. B. Ray High School in Corpus Christi, Texas, where he played baseball. As a senior in 2017, he batted .465 with three home runs alongside going 11–4 with a 1.10 ERA on the mound. He originally committed to play college baseball at Texas A&M University–Corpus Christi, but later switched his commitment to Baylor University. He was not selected out of high school in the 2017 Major League Baseball draft.

In 2018, Loftin's freshman year at Baylor, he appeared in 55 games (making 53 starts), batting .306 with six home runs and 36 RBIs, earning Freshman All-American honors alongside being named to the Big 12 Conference All-Second Team and All-Freshman Team. As a sophomore in 2019, Loftin started 53 games in which he hit .323 with six home runs, 41 RBIs, and 18 doubles. He was named to the All-Big 12 First Team. That summer, he played for both the Hyannis Harbor Hawks of the Cape Cod Baseball League and for the United States collegiate national baseball team. Prior to Loftin's junior year in 2020, he was named the Big 12 Conference Preseason Player of the Year. Over 14 games for his junior season, he batted .298 with two home runs and 15 RBIs before the college baseball season was cut short due to the COVID-19 pandemic.

== Professional career ==
The Kansas City Royals selected Loftin with the 32nd overall pick in the 2020 Major League Baseball draft. On June 23, Loftin signed with the Royals on a $3 million signing bonus. He did not play in a game in 2020 due to the cancellation of the minor league season because of the COVID-19 pandemic.

Loftin was assigned to the Quad Cities River Bandits of the High-A Central for the 2021 season, slashing .289/.373/.463 with ten home runs and 57 RBIs over ninety games. He was assigned to the Northwest Arkansas Naturals of the Double-A Texas League to begin the 2022 season. In early August, he was promoted to the Omaha Storm Chasers of the Triple-A International League. Over 128 games between the two teams, he slashed .254/.333/.403 with 17 home runs and 66 RBIs. Loftin returned to Omaha to open the 2023 season. In 82 games in Triple-A, he batted .270/.344/.444 with 14 home runs and 56 RBI.

On September 1, 2023, Loftin was selected to the 40-man roster and promoted to the major leagues for the first time. He made his MLB debut that day versus the Boston Red Sox and went 2-for-3 with a double, a walk, an RBI, and one run scored in a 13-2 Royals win.

The Royals named Loftin to his first ever Opening Day roster to begin the 2024 season. On May 31, 2024, he pitched a scoreless ninth inning in relief during a blowout against the San Diego Padres. On June 20, Loftin hit his first MLB home run off of Hogan Harris of the Oakland Athletics. Across 56 appearances for the Royals, he batted .189/.282/.236 with one home run, 14 RBI, and one stolen base. He also played with Omaha and hit .302 with seven home runs over 58 games.

Loftin was optioned to Omaha to begin the 2025 season. He was recalled by the Royals on April 27. Loftin played in 67 games for the Royals and hit .208 with four home runs and 20 RBI. Across 43 games in the minor leagues with Omaha, he batted .303.

Loftin was assigned to Omaha to start the 2026 season. He was recalled by the Royals on April 20, and spent the remainder of the season with the team. Loftin played in 118 games for the Royals and batted .240 with eight home runs, 45 RBI, and 27 doubles. He was named a finalist for the Gold Glove Award for American League third basemen.
