= Garrett Hampson =

American baseball player (born 1994)

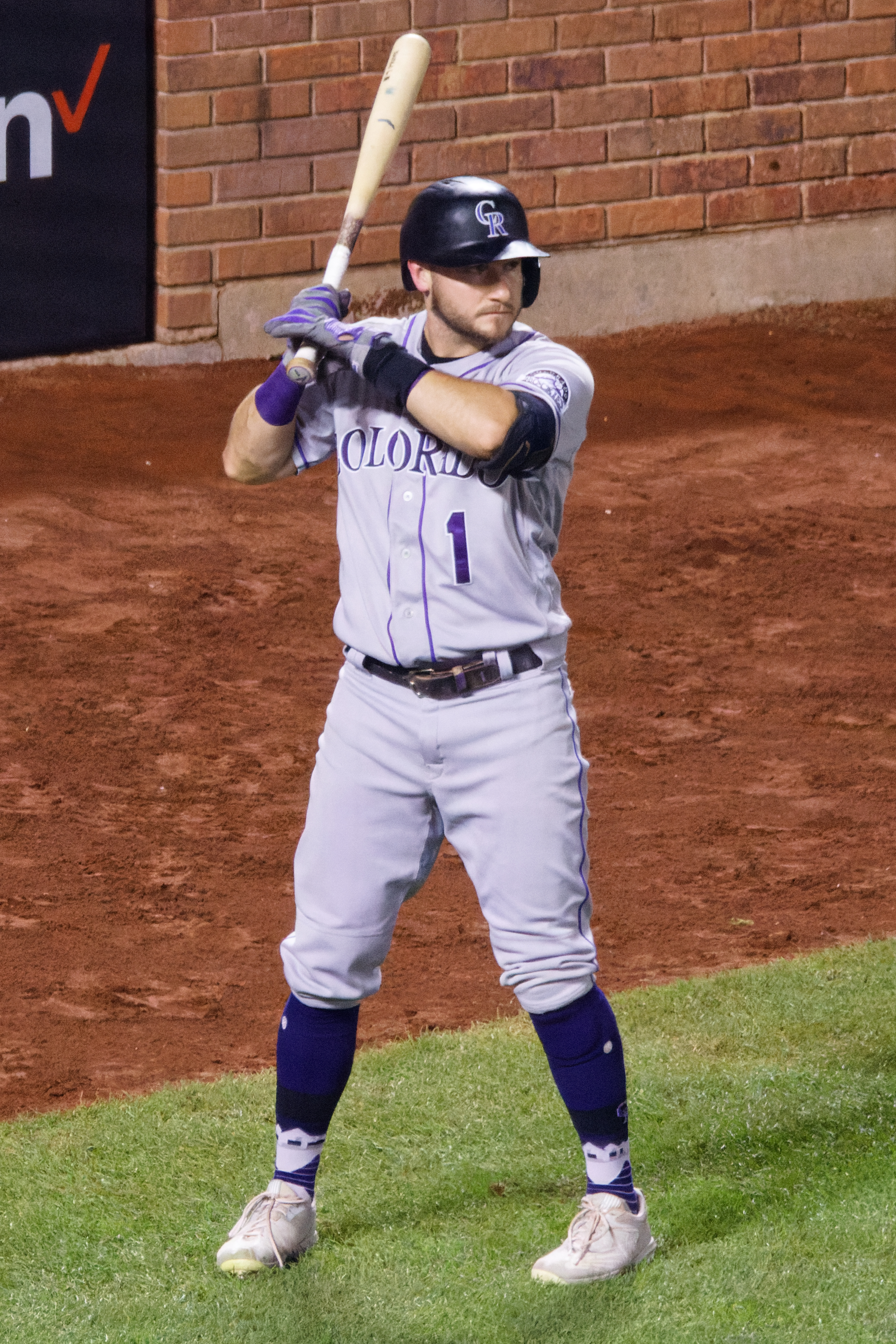
- Hampson with the Rockies in 2022

Free agent
- Utility player
- Born: October 10, 1994 (age 32); Reno, Nevada, U.S.
- Bats: Right Throws: Right

MLB debut
- July 21, 2018, for the Colorado Rockies

MLB statistics (through 2025 season)
- Batting average: .235
- Home runs: 29
- Runs batted in: 130
- Stats at Baseball Reference

Teams
- Colorado Rockies (2018–2022); Miami Marlins (2023); Kansas City Royals (2024); Arizona Diamondbacks (2025); Cincinnati Reds (2025); St. Louis Cardinals (2025)

Garrett Reese Hampson (born October 10, 1994) is an American professional baseball utility player who is a free agent. He has previously played in Major League Baseball (MLB) for the Colorado Rockies, Miami Marlins, Kansas City Royals, Arizona Diamondbacks, Cincinnati Reds and St. Louis Cardinals. Hampson was selected by the Rockies in the third round of the 2016 MLB draft and made his MLB debut with them 2018.

== Early life and college career ==
Hampson was born and raised in Reno, Nevada, and attended Reno High School. He played both basketball and baseball for the Huskies, and hit .469 in three years as a varsity player with 418 hits and 158 runs scored and was a two-time All-State selection as Reno won the Northern Nevada 4A Region baseball championship in both his junior and senior years. After his senior year, Hampson was drafted by the Washington Nationals in the 26th round 2013 Major League Baseball draft, but opted not to sign and instead play college baseball at Long Beach State University.

Hampson played three seasons for the Dirtbags, and was named the Big West Conference Field Freshman of the Year in 2014 and the conference Defensive Player of the Year in 2016. He was a .303 hitter over the course of his collegiate career with 213 hits (seventh-most in school history) and 50 stolen bases (third-most). After the 2014 and 2015 seasons, he played collegiate summer baseball with the Chatham Anglers of the Cape Cod Baseball League.

== Professional career ==
=== Colorado Rockies ===
Hampson was drafted by the Colorado Rockies in the 3rd round, with the 81st overall selection, of the 2016 Major League Baseball draft. He signed and spent his first professional season with the Low-A Boise Hawks where he batted .301 with two home runs, 44 RBI and 36 stolen bases. Hampson was named the 19th best prospect in the Rockies system prior to the 2017 season. In 2017, he played for the High-A Lancaster JetHawks, posting a .326 batting average with eight home runs, 70 RBI and 51 stolen bases. Hampson began 2018 with the Double-A Hartford Yard Goats, and was promoted to the Triple-A Albuquerque Isotopes in May.

Hampson was called up to the major leagues for the first time on July 21, 2018, and made his Major League debut that day. In his first Major League season, Hampson hit .275 (11-for-40) with four RBI and two stolen bases in 24 games.

In 2019, Hampson had the fastest sprint speed of all major league second basemen, at 30.1 feet/second. In 105 games for the Rockies, he slashed .247/.302/.385 with eight home runs, 27 RBI, and 15 stolen bases.

Hampson played in 53 games for Colorado during the COVID-19-shortened season, hitting .234/.287/.383 with five home runs, 11 RBI, and six stolen bases. In 2021, he tied for the major league lead in bunt hits, with seven. In 147 appearances for Colorado, Hampson batted .234/.289/.380 with 11 home runs, 33 RBI, and 17 stolen bases.

In 90 games for the Rockies in 2022, Hampson hit .211/.287/.307 with two home runs, 15 RBI, and 12 stolen bases. On November 18, 2022, Hampson was non-tendered by Colorado, and became a free agent.

=== Miami Marlins ===
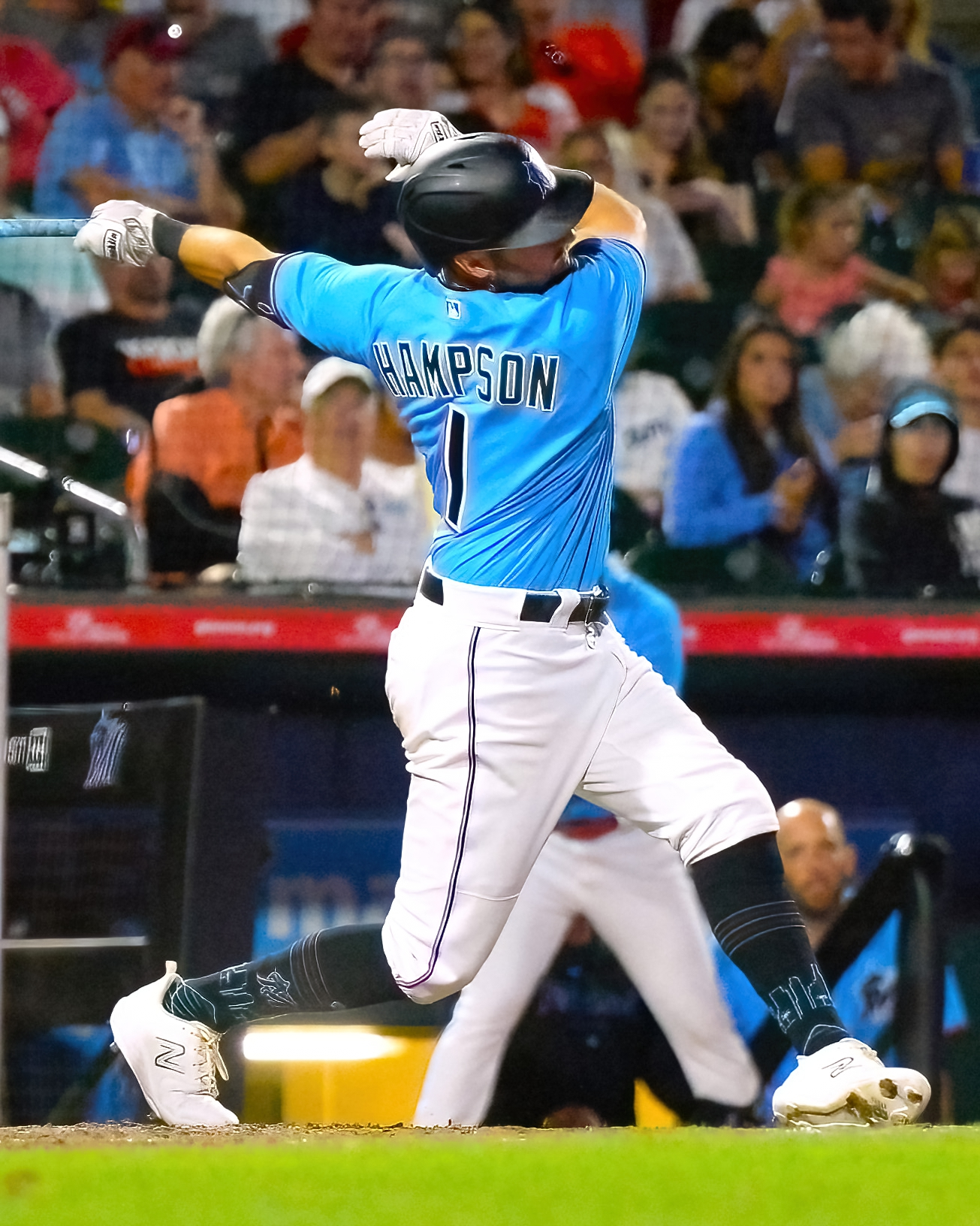
Hampson with the Miami Marlins in 2023

On December 18, 2022, Hampson signed a minor league contract with the Miami Marlins organization. On March 15, 2023, Hampson was selected to the 40-man roster. He was optioned to the Triple-A Jacksonville Jumbo Shrimp to begin the 2023 season. In 98 games for Miami, he posted a career–best .276/.349/.380 with 3 home runs, 23 RBI, and 5 stolen bases. On November 17, 2023, Hampson was non-tendered by the Marlins and became a free agent.

=== Kansas City Royals ===
On November 29, 2023, Hampson signed a one-year contract worth $2 million with the Kansas City Royals. He played in 113 games for Kansas City in 2024, batting .230/.275/.300 with no home runs, 16 RBI, and seven stolen bases.

=== Arizona Diamondbacks ===
On January 31, 2025, Hampson signed a minor league contract with the Arizona Diamondbacks. On March 21, Hampson triggered the opt-out clause in his contract, giving Arizona 48 hours to add him to their roster or grant him his release. On March 23, the Diamondbacks formally selected Hampson's contract, adding him to their Opening Day roster. In 18 appearances for Arizona, he slashed .167/.359/.167 with two stolen bases. Hampson was designated for assignment by the Diamondbacks on May 12. He was released by the team on May 18.

=== Cincinnati Reds ===
On May 23, 2025, Hampson signed a major league contract with the Cincinnati Reds. In nine games for Cincinnati, he went 3-for-18 (.167) with one walk. On June 22, Hampson was designated for assignment by the Reds.

=== St. Louis Cardinals ===
On June 24, 2025, Hampson was claimed off waivers by the St. Louis Cardinals. In 35 appearances for St. Louis, he went 3-for-29 (.103) with one RBI and one stolen base. Hampson was designated for assignment by the Cardinals on September 8. He was released by St. Louis on September 11.

=== Cincinnati Reds (second stint) ===
On December 29, 2025, Hampson signed a minor league contract with the Cincinnati Reds. In 83 games with Triple-A Louisville Bats he batted .242/.301/.356 with 4 home runs, 26 RBIs and 8 stolen bases. He elected free agency on November 2.
