= Michael Massey =

American baseball player (born 1998)

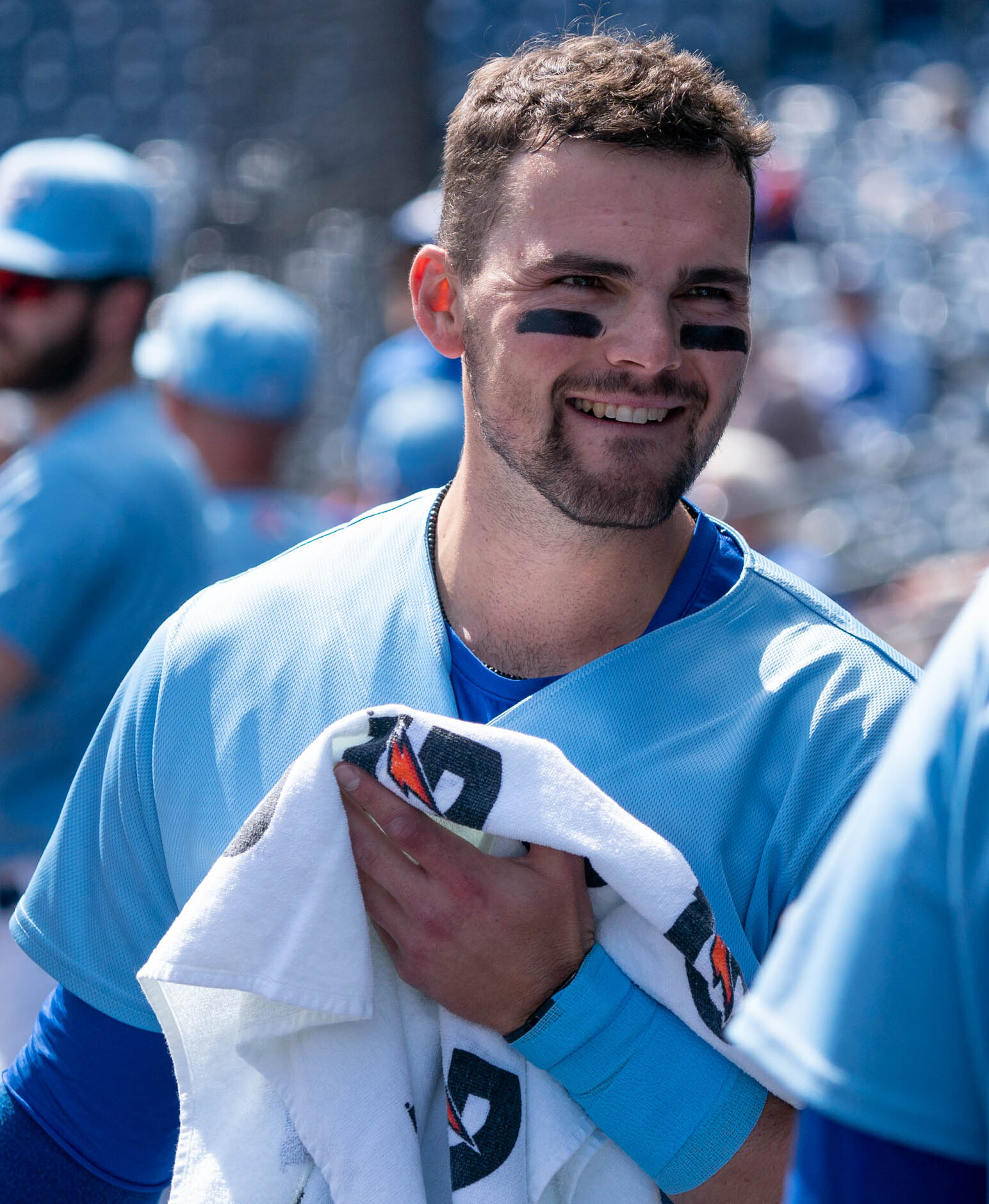
- Massey with the Omaha Storm Chasers in 2024

Kansas City Royals – No. 19
- Second baseman / Left fielder
- Born: March 22, 1998 (age 28); Palos Park, Illinois, U.S.
- Bats: Left Throws: Right

MLB debut
- July 15, 2022, for the Kansas City Royals

MLB statistics (through 2026 season)
- Batting average: .250
- Home runs: 49
- Runs batted in: 187
- Stats at Baseball Reference

Teams
- Kansas City Royals (2022–present)

Michael Massey (born March 22, 1998) is an American professional baseball second baseman and left fielder for the Kansas City Royals of Major League Baseball (MLB). He made his MLB debut in 2022.

== Amateur career ==
Massey attended high school at Brother Rice High School in Chicago, Illinois. He subsequently attended the University of Illinois, where he played college baseball for the Illinois Fighting Illini. As a freshman with Illinois in 2017, he started 51 games and batted .330 with six home runs and 36 runs batted in (RBI). He started 53 games as a sophomore, hitting .326 with six home runs and 46 RBI. He spent the summer of 2018 playing in the Cape Cod Baseball League for the Brewster Whitecaps.

As a junior in 2019, Massey dealt with a back injury for part of the season. He appeared in 55 games in which he hit .317 with five home runs, 28 RBI, and 14 stolen bases.

== Professional career ==
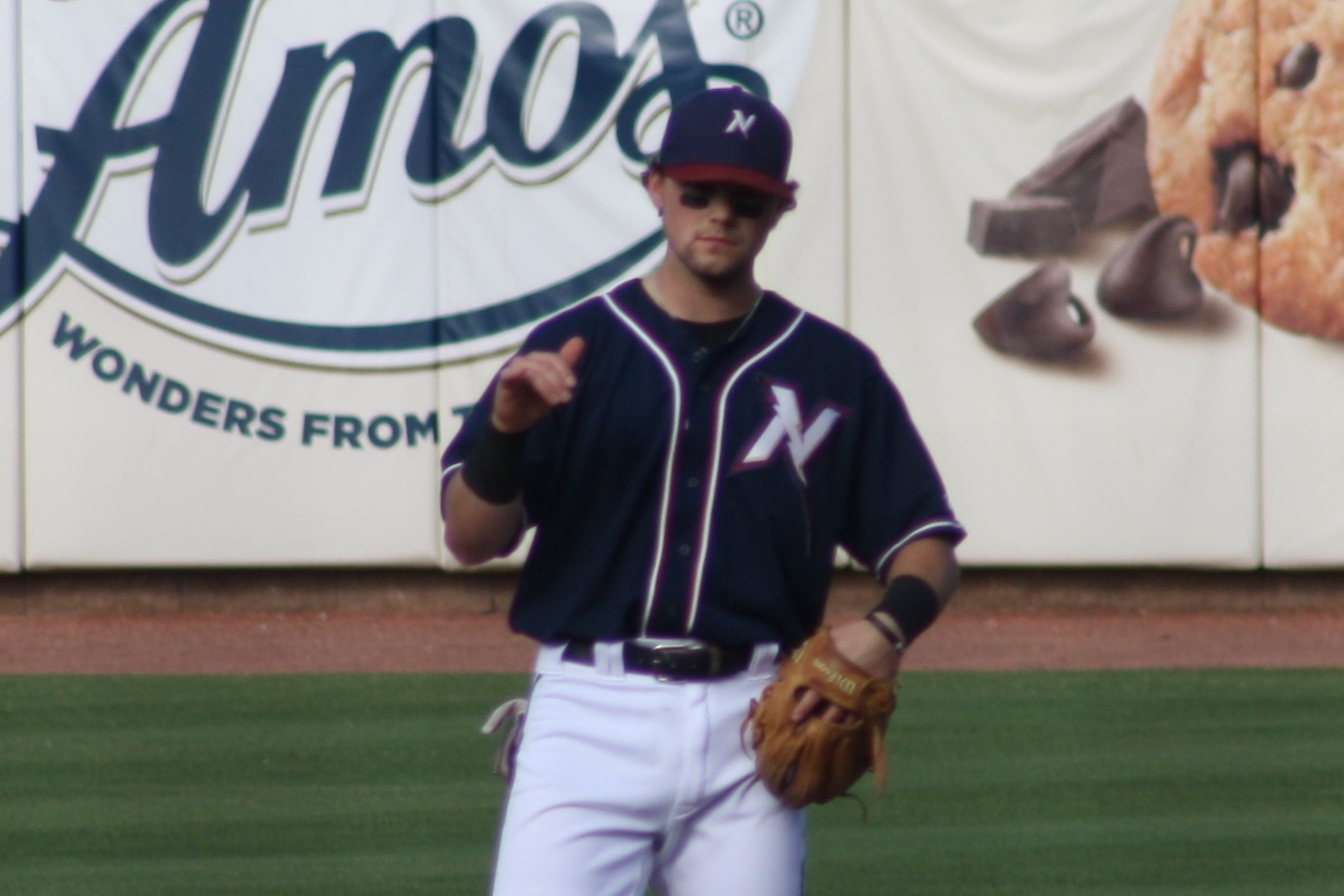
Massey with the Northwest Arkansas Naturals in 2022

=== Minor leagues ===
The Kansas City Royals selected Massey in the fourth round of the 2019 Major League Baseball draft.

Massey made his professional debut with the Burlington Royals of the Rookie-level Appalachian League, batting .272 with five home runs and 25 RBI over 42 games. He did not play a minor league game in 2020 due to the cancellation of the minor league season due to the COVID-19 pandemic. Massey spent the 2021 season with the Quad Cities River Bandits of the High-A Central with whom he slashed .289/.351/.531 with 21 home runs, 87 RBI, and 27 doubles over 99 games. He also was awarded the Gold Glove at second base. He was assigned to the Northwest Arkansas Naturals of the Double-A Texas League to begin the 2022 season. In mid-June, he was promoted to the Omaha Storm Chasers of the Triple-A International League.

=== Major leagues ===
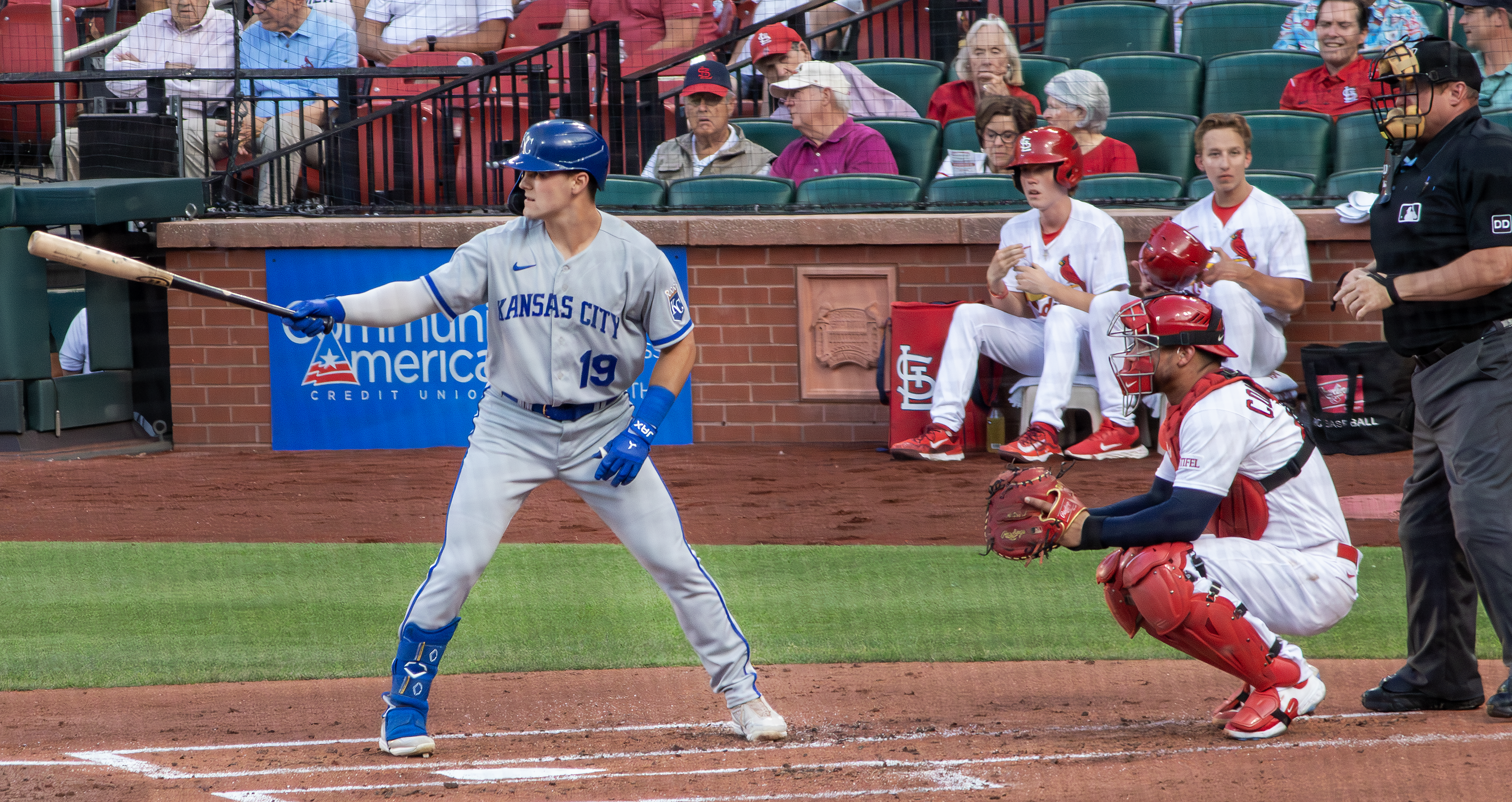
Massey at bat in St. Louis in 2023.

On July 14, 2022, the Royals selected Massey's contract and promoted him to the major leagues. He made his MLB debut the next night as a pinch-hitter versus the Toronto Blue Jays at Rogers Centre, striking out in his only at-bat. He made his first major league start on July 16 versus the Blue Jays and recorded his first MLB hit, a single off of Max Castillo, in his first at-bat. He was optioned back to the minors on July 18, and called up to the major leagues once again on August 3 following the trade of starting second baseman Whit Merrifield. On August 18, Massey hit his first career home run, a solo shot off of Shawn Armstrong of the Tampa Bay Rays. He played in 52 games for the Royals in 2022, hitting .343 with four home runs and 17 RBI.

In 2023, Massey appeared in 129 games for the Royals and batted .229 with 15 home runs and 55 RBI. In 2024, Massey played in 100 games (88 starts at second base and designated hitter) and hit .259 with 14 home runs and 45 RBI. Massey missed time during the 2025 season due to an ankle injury, illness, back spasms, and a wrist fracture. He played in 77 games and batted .244 with three home runs and made his first career appearance as a left fielder.

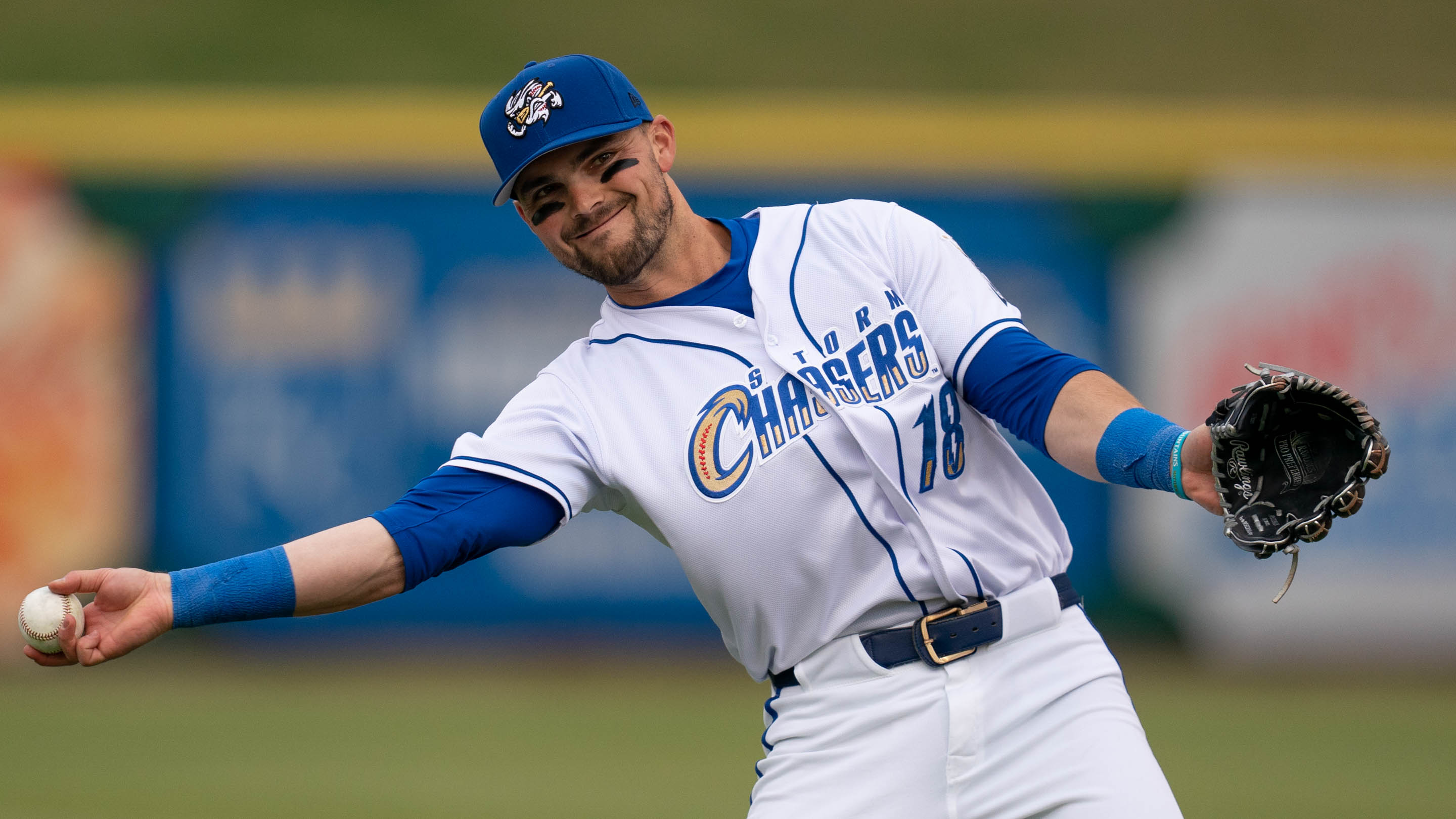
Massey on a rehab assignment in Omaha in 2026.

Prior to the 2026 season, Massey and the Royals agreed to a $1.5 million contract, avoiding salary arbitration. He suffered a calf strain in 2026 spring training and began the season on the injured list. Massey returned to the Royals on April 6. He also suffered a concussion in August and missed six games. Massey ended the 2026 season having played 131 games and batted .274 with 13 home runs and 50 RBI. He was named a finalist for a Gold Glove Award for American League second basemen.

== Personal life ==
Massey's father, Keith, played college baseball at the University of Illinois in the 1980s. Massey grew up a fan of the Chicago White Sox. Massey and his wife married in November 2024.
