= MJ Melendez =

American baseball player (born 1998)

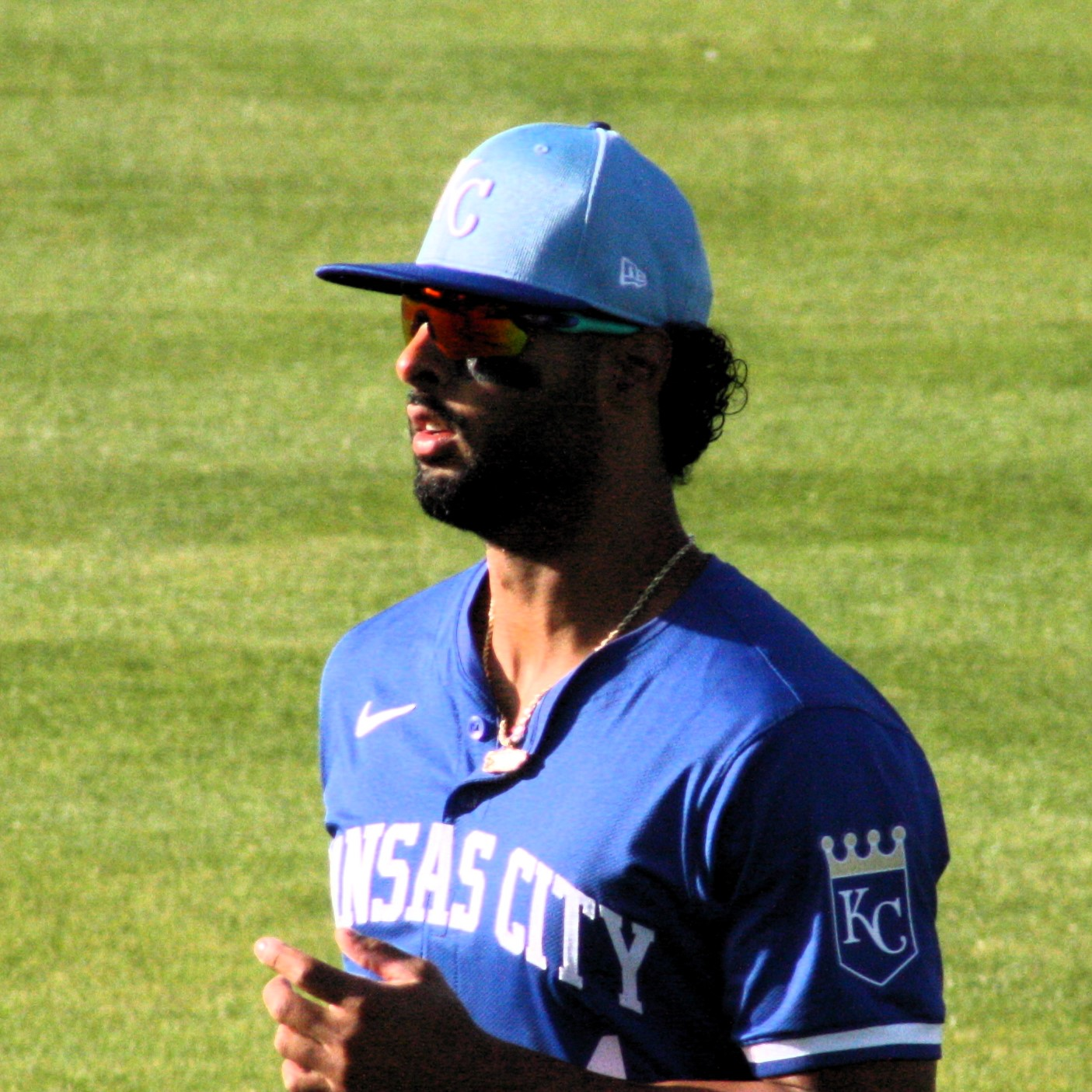
- Melendez with the Kansas City Royals in 2024

Free agent
- Left fielder
- Born: November 29, 1998 (age 27); Daytona Beach, Florida, U.S.
- Bats: Left Throws: Right

MLB debut
- May 3, 2022, for the Kansas City Royals

MLB statistics (through 2026 season)
- Batting average: .213
- Home runs: 56
- Runs batted in: 174
- Stats at Baseball Reference

Teams
- Kansas City Royals (2022–2025); New York Mets (2026)

Mervyl Samuel Melendez Jr. (born November 29, 1998) is an American professional baseball left fielder who is a free agent. He has previously played in Major League Baseball (MLB) for the Kansas City Royals and New York Mets.

Melendez was selected by the Royals in the second round of the 2017 Major League Baseball draft and made his MLB debut with them in 2022. He signed with the Mets as a free agent ahead of the 2026 season.

== Amateur career ==
Melendez attended St. James School in Montgomery, Alabama for three years before transferring to Westminster Christian School in Palmetto Bay, Florida for his senior year. He was a member of the United States national team in 2016. He committed to play college baseball at Florida International University.

== Professional career ==
=== Kansas City Royals ===
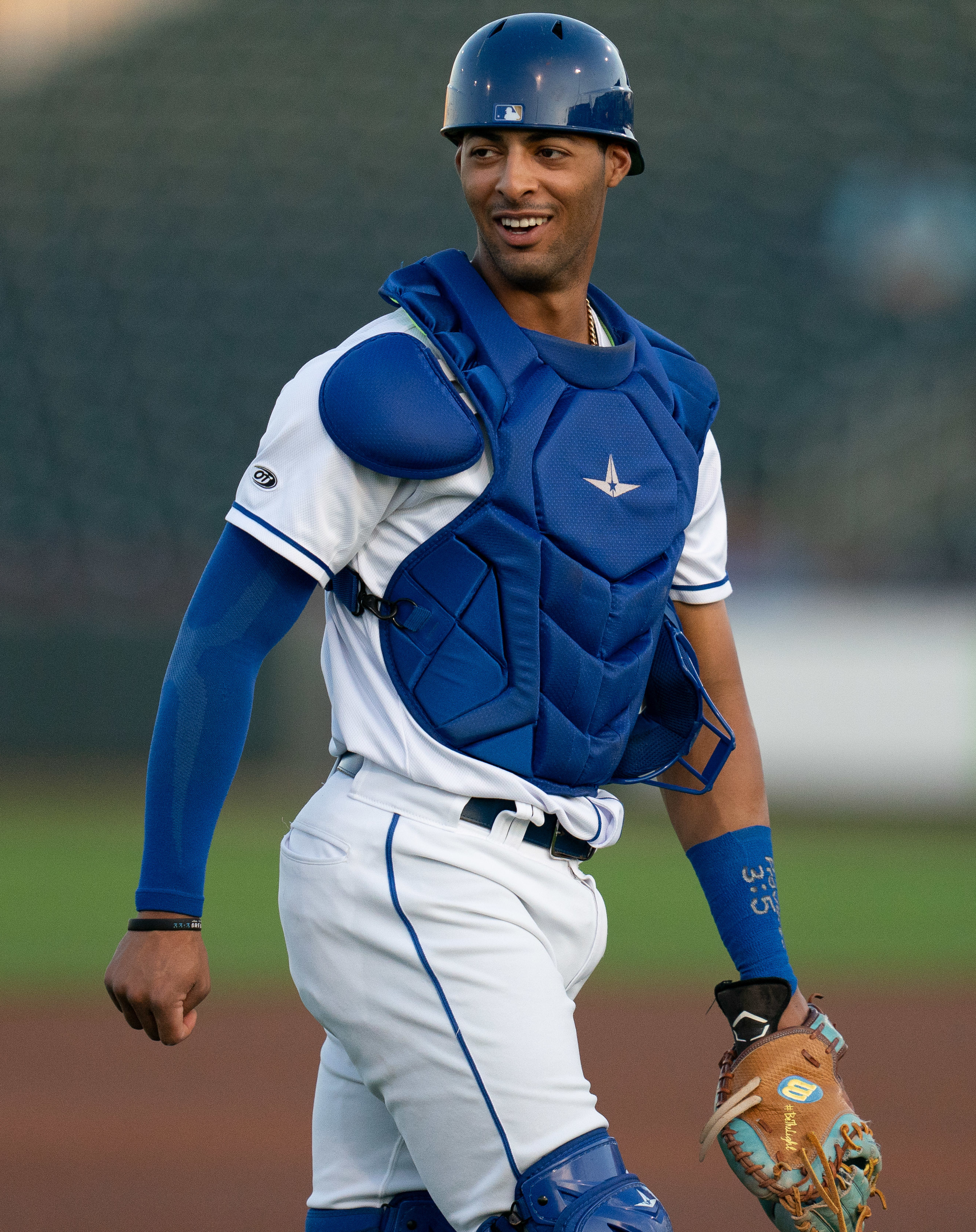
Melendez with the Omaha Storm Chasers in 2021

The Kansas City Royals selected Melendez in the second round, 52nd overall, of the 2017 Major League Baseball draft. He signed with Kansas City for $2.1 million. After signing with the Royals, Melendez made his professional debut with the rookie-level Arizona League Royals where he posted a .262 batting average with four home runs and thirty RBI over 47 games. He spent 2018 with the Lexington Legends of the Single-A South Atlantic League, slashing .251/.322/.492 with 19 home runs and 73 RBI in 111 games, earning All-Star honors. Melendez spent 2019 with the Wilmington Blue Rocks of the High-A Carolina League and was named an All-Star. Over 110 games, he slashed .163/.260/.311 with nine home runs and 54 RBI. He did not play in a game in 2020 due to the cancellation of the minor league season because of the COVID-19 pandemic.

To begin the 2021 season, Melendez was assigned to the Northwest Arkansas Naturals of the Double-A Central. He earned Double-A Central Player of the Month honors for July after batting .333 with 12 home runs over the course of the month. After slashing .285/.372/.628 with 28 home runs and 65 RBI over 79 games, he was promoted to the Omaha Storm Chasers of the Triple-A East in early August. Over 44 games with Omaha, Melendez slashed .293/.413/.620 with 13 home runs and 38 RBI. His total of 41 home runs for the season led the minor leagues, and he became the first ever catcher to win the Joe Bauman Home Run Award.

On November 19, 2021, the Royals added Melendez to their 40-man roster, protecting him from the Rule 5 draft. He returned to Omaha to begin the 2022 season.

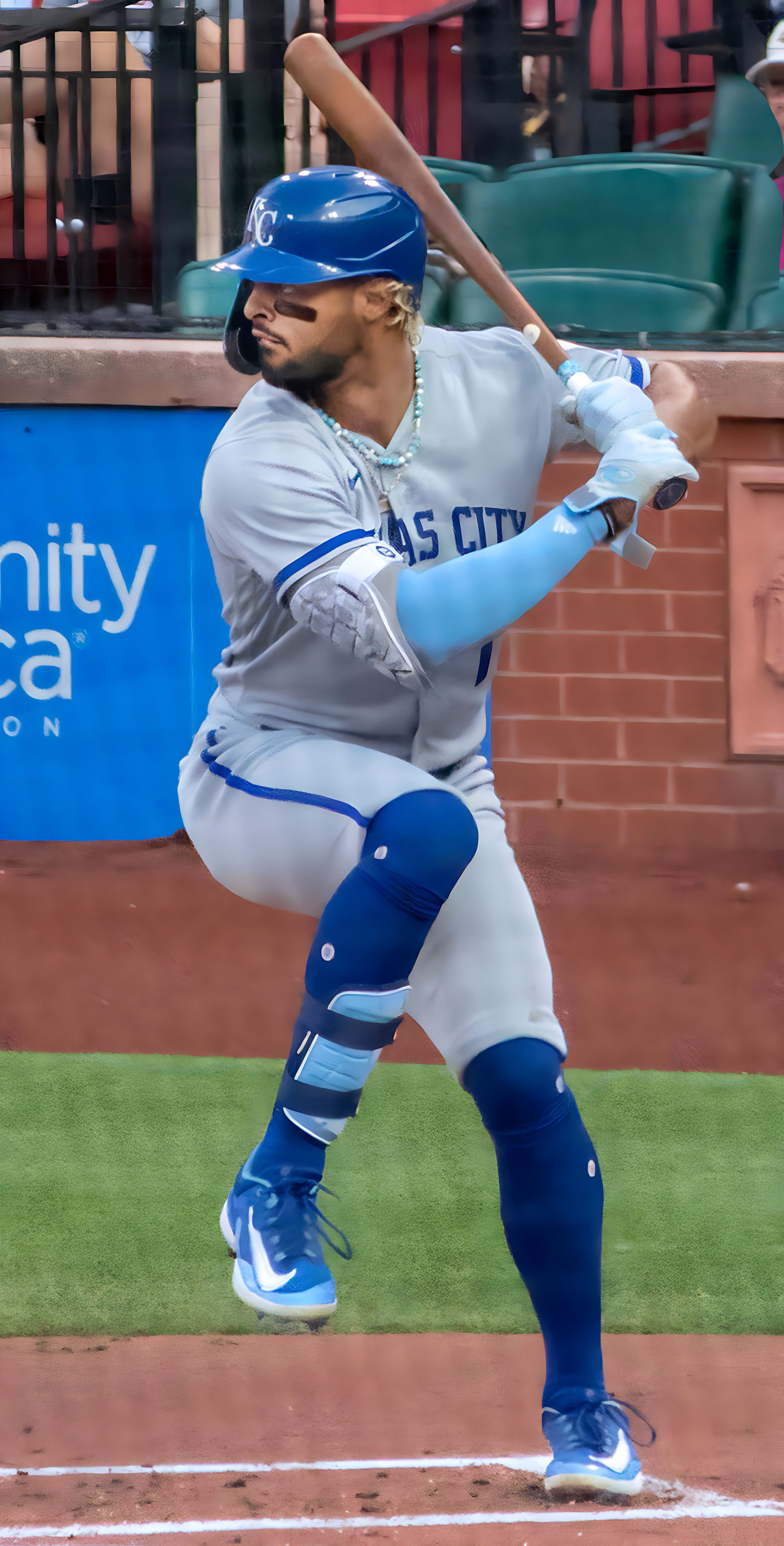
Melendez with the Royals in 2023

On May 2, 2022, Melendez was a designated hitter for Omaha. In the game, he was on second base and tagged up on a line drive to right, and got thrown out at third. His manager came up to him in the dugout and, saying he really didn't want to tell him this way, broke the news that he was headed for the major leagues. On May 17, Melendez hit his first career home run during a game against the Chicago White Sox off of Tanner Banks. On July 4, Melendez had his first career multi-homer game, launching home runs off of Jake Odorizzi and Phil Maton of the Houston Astros. He made 129 appearances for the team during his rookie campaign, batting .217/.313/.393 with 18 home runs and 62 RBI.

Melendez made 148 appearances for the Royals during the 2023 season, slashing .235/.316/.398 with 16 home runs, 56 RBI, and six stolen bases. He played in 135 contests for Kansas City in 2024, hitting .206/.273/.400 with 17 home runs and 44 RBI.

Melendez played in 23 games for Kansas City during the 2025 campaign, going 5-for-60 (.083) with one home run, one RBI, and three stolen bases. On November 21, 2025, he was non-tendered by the Royals and became a free agent.

=== New York Mets ===
On February 12, 2026, Melendez signed a one-year, $1.5 million contract with the New York Mets. He was optioned to the Triple-A Syracuse Mets to begin the regular season. On April 15, he was called up to the major leagues, replacing the injured Jared Young and joining the Mets during their series against the Los Angeles Dodgers at Dodger Stadium. In his first game for the Mets, Melendez went 2-for-4, striking two doubles off of Shohei Ohtani. On May 29, Melendez hit his first career walk-off home run in a 9–7 victory over the Miami Marlins. He made 56 appearances for New York, batting .192/.315/.350 with four home runs and 11 RBI. Melendez was designated for assignment by the Mets on August 2. He cleared waivers and was sent outright to Triple–A Syracuse on August 4. He played in 75 games for Syrcause and batted .264 with 22 home runs and 48 RBI. On October 15, he elected free agency.

== International career ==
Melendez played for the Puerto Rico national baseball team at the 2023 World Baseball Classic.

== Personal life ==
Melendez's father, Mervyl Melendez, is a college baseball coach.

In 2022, MJ Melendez was among ten Royals unable to travel to Canada to play the Toronto Blue Jays due to being unvaccinated against COVID-19, as public health policies of the Canadian government at the time prohibited unvaccinated non-citizens from entering the country.
