= Sam Long (baseball) =

American baseball player (born 1995)

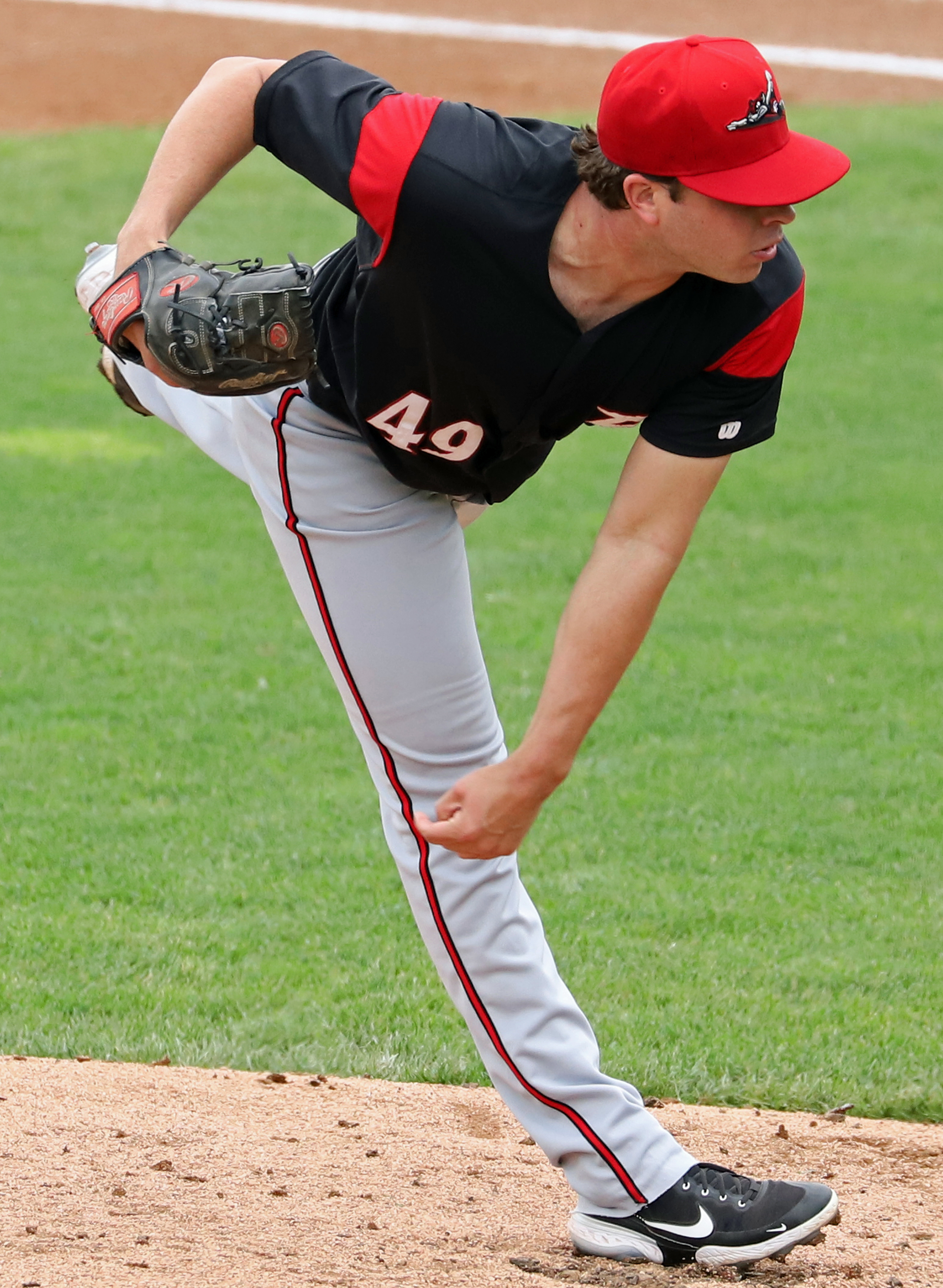
- Long with the Richmond Flying Squirrels in 2021

Chiba Lotte Marines – No. 73
- Pitcher
- Born: July 8, 1995 (age 31); Fair Oaks, California, U.S.
- Bats: Left Throws: Left

Professional debut
- MLB: June 9, 2021, for the San Francisco Giants
- NPB: March 27, 2026, for the Chiba Lotte Marines

MLB statistics (through 2025 season)
- Win–loss record: 8–11
- Earned run average: 4.65
- Strikeouts: 180

NPB statistics (through August 21, 2026)
- Win–loss record: 1-6
- Earned run average: 4.75
- Strikeouts: 44
- Stats at Baseball Reference

Teams
- San Francisco Giants (2021–2022); Oakland Athletics (2023); Kansas City Royals (2024–2025); Chiba Lotte Marines (2026–present)

Samuel Trenton Long (born July 8, 1995) is an American professional baseball pitcher for the Chiba Lotte Marines of Nippon Professional Baseball (NPB). He has previously played in Major League Baseball (MLB) for the San Francisco Giants, Oakland Athletics, and Kansas City Royals. He played college baseball for the Sacramento State Hornets. He was drafted by the Tampa Bay Rays in the 18th round of the 2016 MLB draft.

In 2018, at 23 years of age, he stopped playing baseball for a year and explored becoming a firefighter, but decided to stick with baseball and made his MLB debut with the Giants in 2021.

== High school and college ==
Long was born and raised in Fair Oaks, California.

Long first attended Rosemont High School, for which he played baseball for two seasons. He then attended Del Campo High School in Carmichael, California as a junior and senior. He was all-league in baseball in 2012. In 2013, he was 4–0 with an 0.88 earned run average (ERA) and 49 strikeouts with only one walk in 31 2/3 innings pitched. He was named Capital Valley Conference MVP that year.

Long played college baseball at California State University, Sacramento for the Hornets. In 2014, he was 8–2 with a 3.03 ERA and was second in the Western Athletic Conference with two shutouts. He was named the WAC's Freshman of the Year, and a Louisville Slugger Freshman All-American.

In 2015 he was 6–4 for the Hornets with a 2.81 ERA, and was 2nd in the conference in WHIP (0.892), third in hits per nine innings pitched (6.4), eighth in strikeouts/walk (3.94) and with 63 strikeouts (in 89 2/3 innings), and ninth in walks/9 IP (1.6).

In 2016, he was 5–8 with a 3.99 ERA, and was eighth in the conference with 68 strikeouts (in 85 2/3 innings). He suffered two herniated disks, but pitched through the injury. As of December 2020, his .224 career average against ranked third all-time for the college, and his wins (19) ranked sixth.

== Professional career ==
=== Tampa Bay Rays ===
Long was drafted by the Tampa Bay Rays in the 18th round, 540th overall, of the 2016 MLB draft, and signed for a signing bonus of $75,000. He made his professional debut with the GCL Rays, and also played for the rookie ball Princeton Rays, recording a 1–1 record and 3.33 ERA in 11 appearances between the two teams.

He split the 2017 season between the Low-A Hudson Valley Renegades and the Single-A Bowling Green Hot Rods, posting a 2.27 ERA with 29 strikeouts in 31.2 innings pitched across 20 appearances.

On March 22, 2018, on the last day of spring training, Long was released by the Rays organization.

At that point, in lieu of playing baseball which he felt was not going to work out, and uncertain as to what he would do with his future, the 23-year-old Long took EMT classes during the summer, thinking perhaps he would become a firefighter. In the fall he resumed studying for his communications degree at Sacramento State.

However, Long had second thoughts about walking away from baseball, and started getting back into shape by eating better and working out hard, went back to his natural over-the-top arm slot, and found that his velocity increased and his curveball was sharper. His agent uploaded a highlight reel to Twitter that went viral of him throwing with his fastball around 93 mph. A Chicago White Sox area scout saw the video and called.

=== Chicago White Sox ===
After not playing for a team in 2018, Long signed a minor league contract with the Chicago White Sox organization on March 5, 2019. He spent the 2019 season in Single-A with the Kannapolis Intimidators, pitching to an 8–5 record and 3.06 ERA with 112 strikeouts and a WHIP of 1.041 in 97.0 innings of work. He held batters to a .205 batting average, with 10.4 strikeouts and 2.6 walks per nine innings, and his fastball hit 95 mph.

Long did not play in a game in 2020 due to the cancellation of the minor league season because of the COVID-19 pandemic. He elected free agency on November 2, 2020.

=== San Francisco Giants ===
On November 17, 2020, Long signed a minor league contract with the San Francisco Giants organization that included an invitation to spring training. He was assigned to the Double-A Richmond Flying Squirrels to start the 2021 season, later receiving a promotion to the Triple-A Sacramento River Cats, where he logged 7.2 scoreless innings.

Long was ranked the 11th-best Giants prospect before the 2021 season. In spring training in 2021, his fastball was up to 97 mph. On June 7, 2021, it was announced that Long would be promoted to the major leagues for the first time during the following series, to be the starting pitcher against the Texas Rangers. At the time, for the season he had a 1.99 ERA with 37 strikeouts and 5 walks in 22.2 innings, between Double-A and Triple-A.

On June 9, he was formally selected to the active roster. In Long's debut game, Zack Littell got the start instead, and was replaced by Long in the second inning. Long notched his first MLB strikeout in the game, punching out Rangers infielder Nick Solak, and struck out seven of the first ten batters he faced. He finished his debut with four innings of one-run ball, with 7 strikeouts. He earned his first career victory on June 20, beating the Philadelphia Phillies with six innings of 2-run ball.

In the 2021 regular season for the Giants, Long was 2–1 with a 5.53 ERA. He pitched 40.2 innings over 12 games (5 starts). Pitching for three minor league teams: Triple-A Sacramento, Double-A Richmond, and the Single-A San Jose Giants, he was 1–1 with a 2.34 ERA in 42.1 innings over 16 games (7 starts).

In 2022 with the Giants, Long was 1–3 with one save and a 3.61 ERA in 28 games (6 starts), in which he threw 42.1 innings. On July 6, Long recorded his first save against the Arizona Diamondbacks, striking out Jordan Luplow on three pitched as his only batter faced. In 2022 with Sacramento, Long was 1–0 with a 4.32 ERA in 8 games (3 starts) in which he threw 16.2 innings. His season ended prematurely on August 26, when he was placed on the injured list with a right oblique strain.

Long was optioned to Triple-A Sacramento to begin the 2023 season. He struggled to a 9.90 ERA in 4 appearances for Sacramento before he was designated for assignment on April 19, 2023.

=== Oakland Athletics ===
On April 23, 2023, Long was traded to the Oakland Athletics in exchange for cash considerations. In 40 appearances for Oakland, he registered a 5.60 ERA with 32 strikeouts and 2 saves in 45.0 innings of work. On October 12, Long was removed from the 40–man roster and sent outright to the Triple-A Las Vegas Aviators. He elected free agency on November 6.

=== Kansas City Royals ===
On December 7, 2023, Long signed a minor league contract with the Kansas City Royals. In 16 games for the Triple–A Omaha Storm Chasers, he recorded a 1.31 ERA with 23 strikeouts and two saves across 20 2/3 innings pitched. On May 20, 2024, the Royals selected Long's contract, adding him to their active roster. In 43 appearances for Kansas City, he compiled a 3-3 record and 3.16 ERA with 44 strikeouts and one save across 42 2/3 innings pitched.

Long made 39 appearances for the Royals in 2025, posting a 2-3 record and 5.36 ERA with 33 strikeouts across 40 1/3 innings pitched. On November 7, 2025, Long was removed from the 40-man roster and sent outright to Omaha, but he rejected the assignment and elected free agency.

=== Chiba Lotte Marines ===
On November 23, 2025, Long signed with the Chiba Lotte Marines of Nippon Professional Baseball.
