= Dairon Blanco (baseball) =

Cuban baseball player (born 1993)

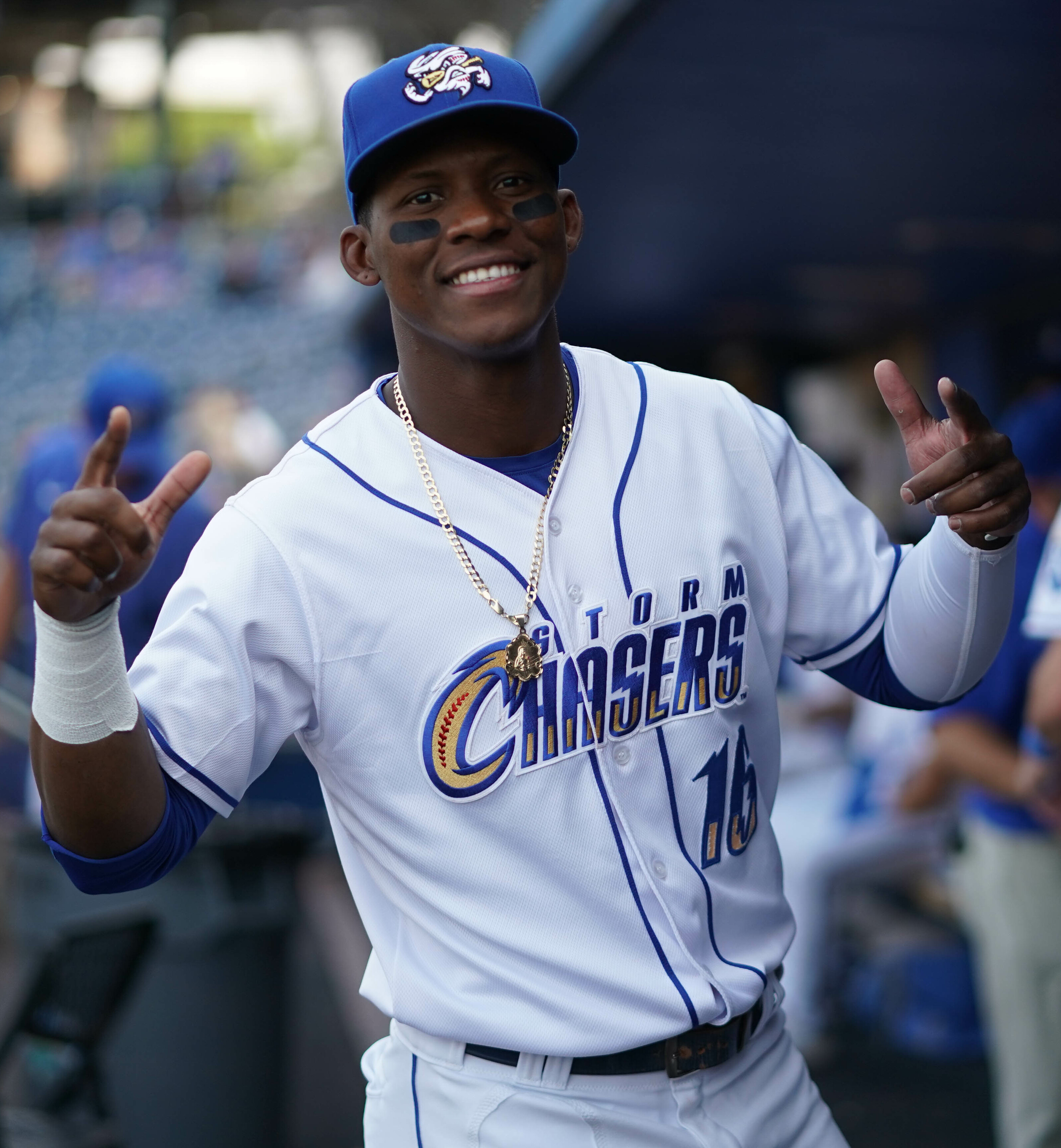
- Blanco with the Omaha Storm Chasers in 2023

Bravos de León – No. 15
- Outfielder
- Born: April 26, 1993 (age 33); Florida, Cuba
- Bats: Right Throws: Right

MLB debut
- May 20, 2022, for the Kansas City Royals

MLB statistics (through 2025 season)
- Batting average: .257
- Home runs: 7
- Runs batted in: 34
- Stolen bases: 59
- Stats at Baseball Reference

Teams
- Kansas City Royals (2022–2025)

Dairon Blanco LaMadrid (born April 26, 1993) is a Cuban professional baseball outfielder for the Bravos de León of the Mexican League. He has previously played in Major League Baseball (MLB) for the Kansas City Royals.

== Career ==
Blanco began his professional career in the Cuban National Series, playing for the Ganaderos de Camaguey, Industriales de La Habana, and the Alazanes de Granma from 2012 through 2016. He defected from Cuba to the United States in May 2016.

=== Oakland Athletics ===
Blanco signed with the Oakland Athletics for $200,000 on April 2, 2018. He was initially graded as a very fast runner. He spent the 2018 season with the High-A Stockton Ports, hitting .291/.342/.406 with one home run, 37 RBI, and 22 stolen bases. He opened the 2019 season with the Double-A Midland RockHounds, hitting .276/.342/.468 with seven home runs, 44 RBI, and 27 stolen bases.

=== Kansas City Royals ===
On July 27, 2019, Blanco and Ismael Aquino were traded to the Kansas City Royals in exchange for Jake Diekman. He finished the 2019 season with the Double-A Northwest Arkansas Naturals, hitting .230/.282/.302 with five RBI and six stolen bases. Blanco did not play in a game in 2020 due to the cancellation of the minor league season because of the COVID-19 pandemic. Blanco split the 2021 season between Northwest Arkansas and the Triple-A Omaha Storm Chasers, hitting a combined .277/.350/.441 with 14 home runs, 53 RBI, and 41 stolen bases.

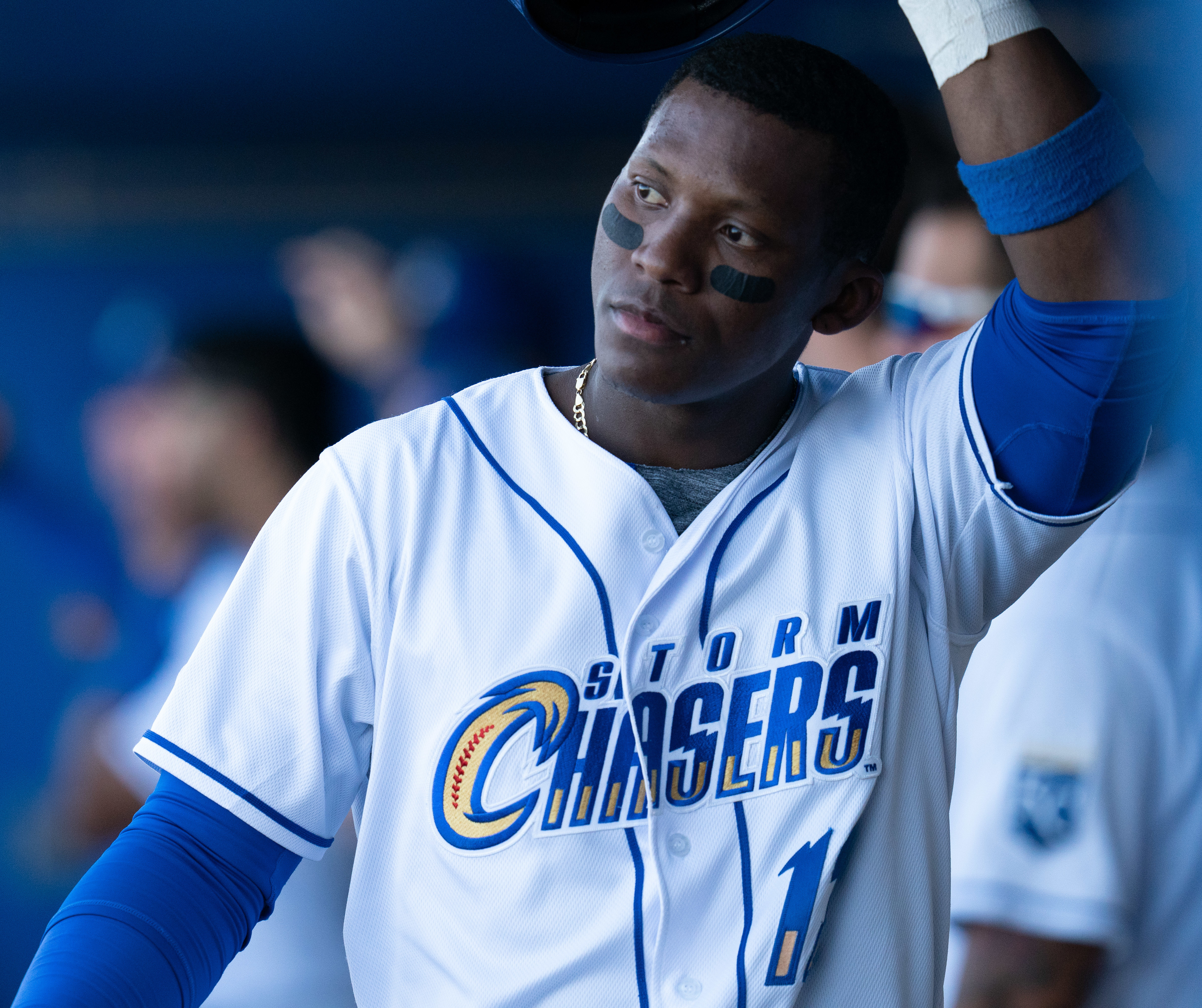
Blanco in 2021

On May 19, 2022, Kansas City selected Blanco's contract to the active roster as a COVID-19 replacement. He made his MLB debut on May 20, recording his first career hit. He appeared in five games for Kansas City, going 2-for-7 in seven plate appearances. On June 3, Blanco was designated for assignment by the Royals. He cleared waivers and was sent outright to Triple-A Omaha on June 7. He spent the remainder of the year in Omaha, hitting .301/.367/.486 with 14 home runs, 61 RBI, and 45 stolen bases across 107 games.

Blanco was assigned to Triple-A Omaha to begin the 2023 season. In 49 games, he batted a stellar .347/.444/.451 with three home runs, 19 RBI, and a career–high 47 stolen bases. On June 12, 2023, Blanco was selected to the major league roster. In 69 games for the Royals in 2023, he slashed .258/.324/.452 with three home runs, 18 RBI, and 24 stolen bases.

On August 17, 2024, Blanco hit two home runs, including his first career grand slam, and driving seven runs in against the Cincinnati Reds. He made 88 total appearances for Kansas City during the regular season, slashing .258/.308/.392 with four home runs, 13 RBI, and 31 stolen bases. Blanco played in nine games for the Royals in 2025, going 1-for-6 (.167) with one RBI and three stolen bases.

On March 2, 2026, Blanco was designated for assignment by the Royals following the signing of Starling Marte.

=== Texas Rangers ===
On March 8, 2026, Blanco was claimed off of waivers by the Texas Rangers. He was optioned to the Triple-A Round Rock Express to begin the regular season. However, Blanco was designated for assignment by the Rangers on March 25. He cleared waivers and was sent outright to Round Rock on March 30. In 21 appearances for the Express, Blanco batted .230/.324/.295 with six RBI and seven stolen bases. He was released by the Rangers organization on May 29.

=== Saraperos de Saltillo ===
On June 2, 2026, Blanco signed with the Saraperos de Saltillo of the Mexican League. In 21 games for the Saraperos, he batted .297/.366/.608 with five home runs and 12 RBI.

=== Bravos de León ===
On July 4, 2026, Blanco was traded to the Bravos de León of the Mexican League.

== See also ==
- List of baseball players who defected from Cuba
