= 2023 Kansas City Royals season =

2023 Kansas City Royals
- League: American League
- Division: Central
- Ballpark: Kauffman Stadium
- City: Kansas City, Missouri
- Record: 56–106 (.346)
- Divisional place: 5th
- Owners: John Sherman
- General managers: J.J. Picollo
- Managers: Matt Quatraro
- Television: Bally Sports Kansas City
- Radio: KCSP 610 AM

The 2023 Kansas City Royals season was the 55th season for the franchise, and their 51st at Kauffman Stadium. It was also the team's first season under the management of Matt Quatraro. They were eliminated from playoff contention for the eighth consecutive season on August 29. Their 56–106 record tied the 2005 season for the lowest winning percentage (.346) in franchise history. They also finished sub-.458 for the 5th consecutive season. The Royals drew an average home attendance of 16,136 in 81 home games in the 2023 MLB season. The total attendance was 1,307,052.

== Offseason ==
The Royals finished the 2022 season 65–97, 27 games out of first place. They missed the playoffs for the seventh consecutive season.

On October 5, 2022, the Royals fired manager Mike Matheny shortly after the season ended. Matheny went 165–219 (.430) over three seasons with the team.

=== Rule changes ===
Pursuant to the CBA, new rule changes were put in place for the 2023 season:

- institution of a pitch clock between pitches;
- limits on pickoff attempts per plate appearance;
- limits on defensive shifts requiring two infielders to be on either side of second and be within the boundary of the infield; and
- larger bases (increased to 18-inch squares);

== Regular season ==
=== American League Central ===
AL Central
Team	W	L	Pct.	GB	Home	Road
Minnesota Twins	87	75	.537	—	47‍–‍34	40‍–‍41
Detroit Tigers	78	84	.481	9	37‍–‍44	41‍–‍40
Cleveland Guardians	76	86	.469	11	42‍–‍39	34‍–‍47
Chicago White Sox	61	101	.377	26	31‍–‍50	30‍–‍51
Kansas City Royals	56	106	.346	31	33‍–‍48	23‍–‍58

=== American League Wild Card ===
Division leaders
Team	W	L	Pct.
Baltimore Orioles	101	61	.623
Houston Astros	90	72	.556
Minnesota Twins	87	75	.537

Wild Card teams (Top 3 teams qualify for postseason)
Team	W	L	Pct.	GB
Tampa Bay Rays	99	63	.611	+10
Texas Rangers	90	72	.556	+1
Toronto Blue Jays	89	73	.549	—
Seattle Mariners	88	74	.543	1
New York Yankees	82	80	.506	7
Boston Red Sox	78	84	.481	11
Detroit Tigers	78	84	.481	11
Cleveland Guardians	76	86	.469	13
Los Angeles Angels	73	89	.451	16
Chicago White Sox	61	101	.377	28
Kansas City Royals	56	106	.346	33
Oakland Athletics	50	112	.309	39

=== Record vs. opponents ===
==== Record vs. American League ====
2023 American League record Source: MLB Standings Grid – 2023
Team	BAL	BOS	CWS	CLE	DET	HOU	KC	LAA	MIN	NYY	OAK	SEA	TB	TEX	TOR	NL
Baltimore	—	7–6	4–2	3–4	6–1	3–3	5–1	5–2	4–2	7–6	6–1	4–2	8–5	3–3	10–3	26–20
Boston	6–7	—	2–4	3–3	5–1	2–5	5–2	3–4	4–3	9–4	4–2	3–3	2–11	3–3	7–6	20–26
Chicago	2–4	4–2	—	8–5	5–8	3–4	6–7	3–4	4–9	4–2	3–4	2–4	1–6	1–5	0–6	15–31
Cleveland	4–3	3–3	5–8	—	4–9	2–4	7–6	3–4	7–6	2–4	5–1	4–3	3–3	3–3	4–3	20–26
Detroit	1–6	1–5	8–5	9–4	—	3–3	10–3	3–3	8–5	2–5	3–4	3–3	1–5	3–4	2–4	21–25
Houston	3–3	5–2	4–3	4–2	3–3	—	1–5	9–4	2–4	2–5	10–3	4–9	3–3	9–4	3–4	28–18
Kansas City	1–5	2–5	7–6	6–7	3–10	5–1	—	2–4	4–9	2–4	2–4	1–6	3–4	1–5	1–6	16–30
Los Angeles	2–5	4–3	4–3	4–3	3–3	4–9	4–2	—	3–3	4–2	7–6	5–8	2–4	6–7	2–4	19–27
Minnesota	2–4	3–4	9–4	6–7	5–8	4–2	9–4	3–3	—	4–3	5–1	3–4	1–5	5–2	3–3	25–21
New York	6–7	4–9	2–4	4–2	5–2	5–2	4–2	2–4	3–4	—	5–1	4–2	5–8	3–4	7–6	23–23
Oakland	1–6	2–4	4–3	1–5	4–3	3–10	4–2	6–7	1–5	1–5	—	1–12	2–5	4–9	2–4	14–32
Seattle	2–4	3–3	4–2	3–4	3–3	9–4	6–1	8–5	4–3	2–4	12–1	—	3–4	4–9	3–3	22–24
Tampa Bay	5–8	11–2	6–1	3–3	5–1	3–3	4–3	4–2	5–1	8–5	5–2	4–3	—	2–4	7–6	27–19
Texas	3–3	3–3	5–1	3–3	4–3	4–9	5–1	7–6	2–5	4–3	9–4	9–4	4–2	—	6–1	22–24
Toronto	3–10	6–7	6–0	3–4	4–2	4–3	6–1	4–2	3–3	6–7	4–2	3–3	6–7	1–6	—	30–16

Updated with the results of all games through October 1, 2023.

==== Record vs. National League ====
2023 American League record vs. National League Source: MLB Standings
Team	ARI	ATL	CHC	CIN	COL	LAD	MIA	MIL	NYM	PHI	PIT	SD	SF	STL	WSH
Baltimore	2–1	1–2	1–2	1–2	2–1	1–2	3–0	1–2	3–0	1–2	2–1	1–2	2–1	1–2	4–0
Boston	2–1	3–1	2–1	1–2	1–2	1–2	0–3	2–1	2–1	2–1	0–3	2–1	1–2	0–3	1–2
Chicago	1–2	2–1	1–3	2–1	1–2	1–2	1–2	0–3	1–2	1–2	1–2	0–3	1–2	1–2	1–2
Cleveland	1–2	1–2	2–1	2–2	1–2	1–2	1–2	1–2	0–3	2–1	2–1	1–2	1–2	2–1	2–1
Detroit	0–3	1–2	1–2	1–2	2–1	1–2	1–2	2–1	3–0	0–3	2–2	1–2	3–0	2–1	1–2
Houston	3–0	3–0	3–0	0–3	3–1	1–2	2–1	1–2	2–1	1–2	2–1	2–1	1–2	2–1	2–1
Kansas City	1–2	0–3	1–2	0–3	1–2	2–1	0–3	0–3	3–0	1–2	0–3	2–1	2–1	2–2	1–2
Los Angeles	1–2	1–2	3–0	0–3	1–2	0–4	0–3	1–2	2–1	1–2	2–1	0–3	2–1	3–0	2–1
Minnesota	3–0	0–3	2–1	2–1	2–1	1–2	1–2	2–2	2–1	2–1	2–1	2–1	1–2	2–1	1–2
New York	2–1	0–3	1–2	3–0	1–2	2–1	1–2	1–2	2–2	2–1	2–1	2–1	2–1	1–2	1–2
Oakland	1–2	2–1	0–3	1–2	2–1	0–3	0–3	3–0	0–3	0–3	2–1	0–3	2–2	1–2	0–3
Seattle	2–1	1–2	1–2	1–2	3–0	0–3	2–1	0–3	1–2	1–2	2–1	3–1	2–1	2–1	1–2
Tampa Bay	2–1	1–2	1–2	2–1	3–0	2–1	3–1	2–1	1–2	0–3	3–0	1–2	2–1	1–2	3–0
Texas	1–3	1–2	1–2	0–3	3–0	1–2	3–0	0–3	2–1	3–0	2–1	0–3	2–1	2–1	1–2
Toronto	3–0	3–0	1–2	2–1	2–1	2–1	2–1	2–1	3–0	1–3	3–0	1–2	2–1	1–2	2–1

Updated with the results of all games through October 1, 2023.

== Roster ==
2023 Kansas City Royals
Roster
Pitchers: 58 Scott Barlow; 62 Jonathan Bowlan; 50 Kris Bubic; 60 Max Castillo; 54 Aroldis Chapman; 45 Taylor Clarke; 65 Dylan Coleman; 53 Austin Cox; 64 Steven Cruz; 74 José Cuas; 41 Tucker Davidson; 22 Amir Garrett; 23 Zack Greinke; 54 Taylor Hearn; 49 Jon Heasley; 43 Carlos Hernández; 56 Brad Keller; 37 Jackson Kowar; 78 Brooks Kriske; 24 Jordan Lyles; 52 Daniel Lynch; 67 Alec Marsh; 21 Mike Mayers; 66 James McArthur; 58 John McMillon; 55 Cole Ragans; 51 Brady Singer; 40 Collin Snider; 63 Josh Staumont; 38 Josh Taylor; 69 Anthony Veneziano; 64 Nick Wittgren; 48 Ryan Yarbrough; 61 Ángel Zerpa	Catchers: 79 Tyler Cropley; 34 Freddy Fermín; 13 Salvador Pérez; 88 Logan Porter; Infielders: 27 Matt Beaty; 17 Hunter Dozier; 15 Matt Duffy; 11 Maikel García; 12 Nick Loftin; 8 Nicky Lopez; 19 Michael Massey; 9 Vinnie Pasquantino; 32 Nick Pratto; 7 Bobby Witt Jr.	Outfielders: 44 Dairon Blanco; 41 Jackie Bradley Jr.; 18 Nate Eaton; 28 Kyle Isbel; 1 MJ Melendez; 14,34 Edward Olivares; 99 Franmil Reyes; 0 Samad Taylor; 17 Nelson Velázquez; 6 Drew Waters	Manager: 33 Matt Quatraro; Coaches: 68 José Alguacil (infield); 84 Zach Bove (assistant pitching); 80 Allan de San Miguel (bullpen catcher); 77 Keoni DeRenne (assistant hitting); 80 Ryan Eigsti (bullpen catcher); 39 Damon Hollins (first base); 26 Paul Hoover (bench); 18 Rusty Kuntz (coach); 70 Parker Morin (bullpen catcher); 57 Mitch Stetter (bullpen); 85 Brian Sweeney (pitching); 25 Vance Wilson (third base); 31 Alec Zumwalt (hitting)

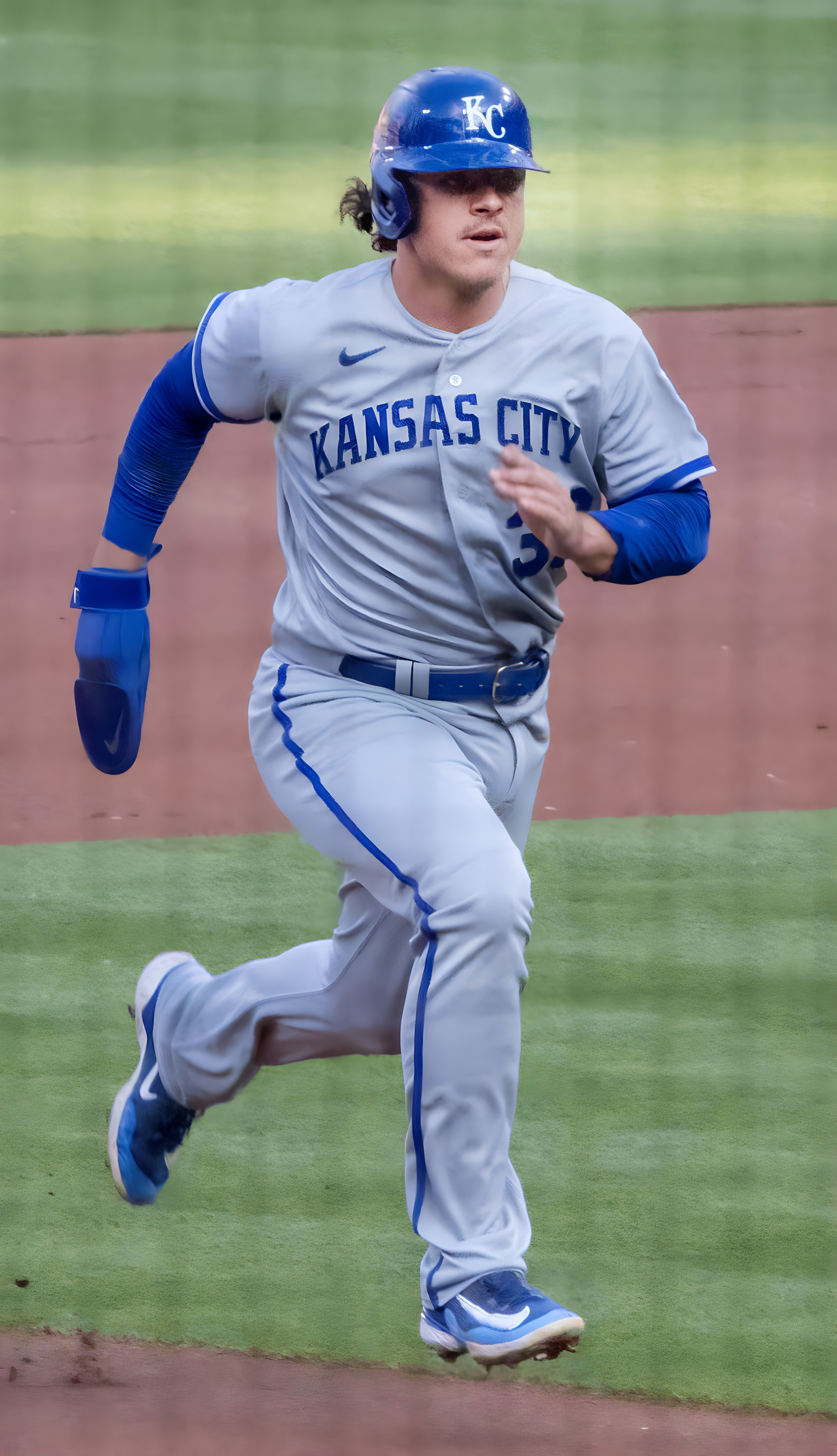
Nick Pratto shown during the Royals' May 30 game against the Cardinals.

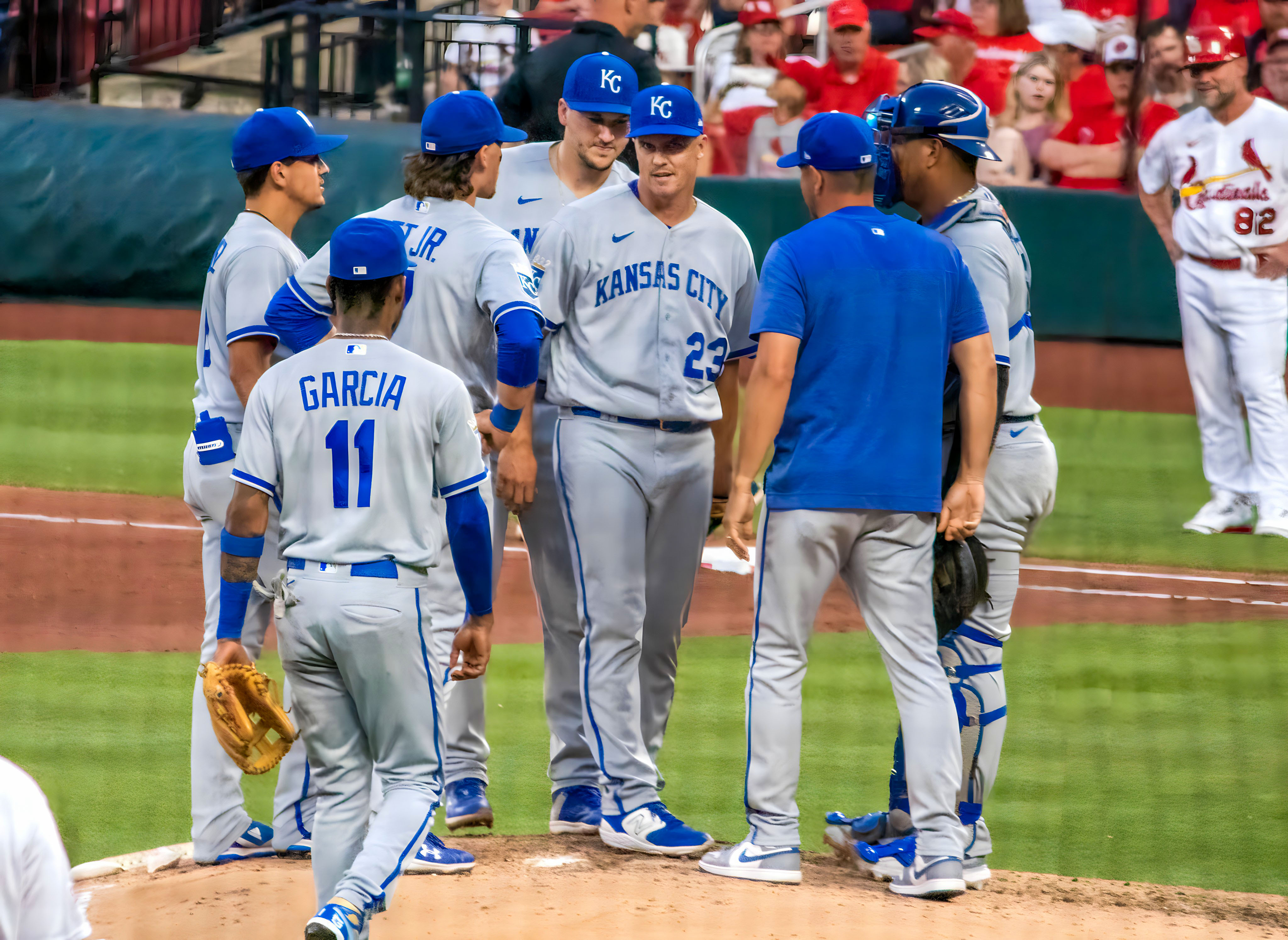
Starting pitcher Zack Greinke has a mound visit.

== Game log ==
Legend
Royals Win	Royals Loss	Game postponed	Eliminated from playoff race

2023 Game Log: 56–106 (Home: 33–48; Away: 23–58)
March/April: 7–22 (Home: 1–12; Away: 6–10)

#	Date	Opponent	Score	Win	Loss	Save	Attendance	Record	Streak
1	March 30	Twins	0–2	López (1–0)	Greinke (0–1)	Durán (1)	38,351	0–1	L1
2	April 1	Twins	0–2	Gray (1–0)	Lyles (0–1)	López (1)	16,633	0–2	L2
3	April 2	Twins	4–7	Ryan (1–0)	Keller (0–1)	—	14,589	0–3	L3
4	April 3	Blue Jays	9–5	Singer (1–0)	Berríos (0–1)	—	10,810	1–3	W1
5	April 4	Blue Jays	1–4	Kikuchi (1–0)	Bubic (0–1)	Romano (2)	12,123	1–4	L1
6	April 5	Blue Jays	0–3	Manoah (1–0)	Greinke (0–2)	Romano (3)	10,015	1–5	L2
7	April 6	Blue Jays	3–6	Gausman (1–1)	Lyles (0–2)	Cimber (1)	10,401	1–6	L3
8	April 7	@ Giants	3–1	Keller (1–1)	Cobb (0–1)	Barlow (1)	40,711	2–6	W1
9	April 8	@ Giants	6–5	Clarke (1–0)	Doval (0–1)	Chapman (1)	35,126	3–6	W2
10	April 9	@ Giants	1–3	Brebbia (1–0)	Yarbrough (0–1)	Rogers (1)	30,207	3–7	L1
11	April 10	@ Rangers	2–11	Heaney (1–1)	Greinke (0–3)	—	17,430	3–8	L2
12	April 11	@ Rangers	5–8 (10)	Ragans (2–0)	Barlow (0–1)	—	17,760	3–9	L3
13	April 12	@ Rangers	10–1	Keller (2–1)	Eovaldi (1–2)	—	18,380	4–9	W1
14	April 14	Braves	3–10	Morton (2–1)	Singer (1–1)	—	20,186	4–10	L1
15	April 15	Braves	3–9	Elder (2–0)	Bubic (0–2)	—	17,644	4–11	L2
16	April 16	Braves	4–5	Anderson (1–0)	Barlow (0–2)	Minter (3)	22,040	4–12	L3
17	April 17	Rangers	0–4	Dunning (1–0)	Lyles (0–3)	—	11,068	4–13	L4
18	April 18	Rangers	2–12	Eovaldi (2–2)	Keller (2–2)	—	12,118	4–14	L5
19	April 19	Rangers	3–12	Pérez (3–1)	Singer (1–2)	—	10,388	4–15	L6
20	April 21	@ Angels	0–2	Ohtani (3–0)	Yarbrough (0–2)	Quijada (4)	44,741	4–16	L7
21	April 22	@ Angels	11–8	Cuas (1–0)	Quijada (0–1)	Barlow (2)	44,148	5–16	W1
22	April 23	@ Angels	3–4	Warren (1–0)	Lyles (0–4)	Estévez (3)	36,016	5–17	L1
23	April 24	@ Diamondbacks	4–5	Chafin (2–0)	Chapman (0–1)	—	9,815	5–18	L2
24	April 25	@ Diamondbacks	5–4	Singer (2–2)	Nelson (1–1)	Barlow (3)	13,835	6–18	W1
25	April 26	@ Diamondbacks	0–2	Gallen (4–1)	Yarbrough (0–3)	Chafin (4)	14,343	6–19	L1
26	April 27	@ Twins	1–7	Stewart (1–0)	Greinke (0–4)	—	12,862	6–20	L2
27	April 28	@ Twins	6–8	López (2–2)	Lyles (0–5)	López (2)	11,754	6–21	L3
28	April 29	@ Twins	3–2	Chapman (1–1)	Durán (0–1)	Barlow (4)	22,883	7–21	W1
29	April 30	@ Twins	4–8	Gray (4–0)	Singer (2–3)	Durán (6)	17,150	7–22	L1

May: 10–17 (Home: 7–9; Away: 3–8)

#	Date	Opponent	Score	Win	Loss	Save	Attendance	Record	Streak
30	May 2	Orioles	7–11	Wells (2–1)	Yarbrough (0–4)	—	10,487	7–23	L2
31	May 3	Orioles	6–0	Greinke (1–4)	Gibson (4–1)	—	10,362	8–23	W1
32	May 4	Orioles	10–13	Canó (1–0)	Chapman (1–2)	—	11,514	8–24	L1
33	May 5	Athletics	8–12	Muller (1–2)	Keller (2–3)	—	15,966	8–25	L2
34	May 6	Athletics	4–5	Waldichuk (1–2)	Singer (2–4)	Jackson (1)	29,549	8–26	L3
35	May 7	Athletics	5–1	Yarbrough (1–4)	Miller (0–2)	—	12,740	9–26	W1
36	May 8	White Sox	12–5	Cuas (2–0)	Cease (2–2)	—	9,814	10–26	W2
37	May 9	White Sox	2–4	Giolito (2–2)	Lyles (0–6)	Graveman (1)	11,258	10–27	L1
38	May 10	White Sox	9–1	Keller (3–3)	Lynn (1–5)	—	12,187	11–27	W1
39	May 11	White Sox	4–3	Barlow (1–2)	López (0–3)	—	20,321	12–27	W2
40	May 12	@ Brewers	1–5	Burnes (4–2)	Taylor (0–1)	—	24,900	12–28	L1
41	May 13	@ Brewers	3–4	Williams (3–0)	Hernández (0–1)	—	35,766	12–29	L2
42	May 14	@ Brewers	6–9	Lauer (4–4)	Lyles (0–7)	—	33,188	12–30	L3
43	May 15	@ Padres	0–4	Wacha (4–1)	Keller (3–4)	—	43,828	12–31	L4
44	May 16	@ Padres	5–4	Singer (3–4)	Lugo (3–3)	Barlow (5)	36,060	13–31	W1
45	May 17	@ Padres	4–3	Taylor (1–1)	Darvish (2–3)	Barlow (6)	31,416	14–31	W2
46	May 19	@ White Sox	0–2	Kopech (2–4)	Greinke (1–5)	Graveman (3)	20,329	14–32	L1
47	May 20	@ White Sox	1–5	Giolito (3–3)	Lyles (0–8)	—	23,984	14–33	L2
48	May 21	@ White Sox	2–5	Lynn (3–5)	Castillo (0–1)	Kelly (1)	23,556	14–34	L3
49	May 22	Tigers	5–8 (10)	Lange (2–0)	Barlow (1–3)	Cisnero (1)	14,229	14–35	L4
50	May 23	Tigers	4–1	Cuas (3–0)	Rodríguez (4–4)	Chapman (2)	13,443	15–35	W1
51	May 24	Tigers	4–6	Vest (1–0)	Taylor (1–2)	Lange (9)	11,898	15–36	L1
52	May 26	Nationals	10–12	Corbin (4–5)	Lyles (0–9)	Kuhl (1)	15,878	15–37	L2
53	May 27	Nationals	2–4	Thompson (3–2)	Taylor (1–3)	Finnegan (11)	19,130	15–38	L3
54	May 28	Nationals	3–2	Barlow (2–3)	Kuhl (0–3)	—	18,319	16–38	W1
55	May 29	@ Cardinals	7–0	Mayers (1–0)	Wainwright (2–1)	—	45,911	17–38	W2
56	May 30	@ Cardinals	1–2	Mikolas (4–1)	Hernández (0–2)	Gallegos (7)	38,406	17–39	L1

June: 6–20 (Home: 3–10; Away: 3–10)

#	Date	Opponent	Score	Win	Loss	Save	Attendance	Record	Streak
57	June 2	Rockies	2–7	Suter (4–0)	Hernández (0–3)	—	23,482	17–40	L2
58	June 3	Rockies	4–6	Carasiti (1–0)	Lynch (0–1)	Lawrence (2)	16,492	17–41	L3
59	June 4	Rockies	2–0	Singer (4–4)	Freeland (4–7)	Barlow (7)	13,128	18–41	W1
60	June 5	@ Marlins	6–9	Garrett (2–2)	Mayers (1–1)	Floro (7)	7,232	18–42	L1
61	June 6	@ Marlins	1–6	Luzardo (5–4)	Greinke (1–6)	—	7,342	18–43	L2
62	June 7	@ Marlins	1–6	Cabrera (5–4)	Lyles (0–10)	—	7,673	18–44	L3
63	June 9	@ Orioles	2–3	Wells (5–2)	Lynch (0–2)	Bautista (17)	18,076	18–45	L4
64	June 10	@ Orioles	1–6	Irvin (1–2)	Singer (4–5)	—	34,136	18–46	L5
65	June 11	@ Orioles	3–11	Gibson (8–3)	Mayers (1–2)	—	23,255	18–47	L6
66	June 12	Reds	4–5 (10)	Farmer (2–3)	Hernández (0–4)	Karcher (1)	20,500	18–48	L7
67	June 13	Reds	4–5	Williamson (1–0)	Lyles (0–11)	Díaz (16)	16,931	18–49	L8
68	June 14	Reds	4–7	Lively (4–4)	Lynch (0–3)	Díaz (17)	13,731	18–50	L9
69	June 16	Angels	0–3	Sandoval (4–6)	Singer (4–6)	Bachman (1)	19,384	18–51	L10
70	June 17	Angels	10–9	Chapman (2–2)	Devenski (3–1)	—	21,056	19–51	W1
71	June 18	Angels	2–5	Anderson (4–1)	Greinke (1–7)	Estévez (19)	24,385	19–52	L1
72	June 19	@ Tigers	4–6	Alexander (2–1)	Clarke (1–1)	Lange (11)	18,438	19–53	L2
73	June 20	@ Tigers	1–0	Lynch (1–3)	Lorenzen (2–5)	Barlow (8)	18,409	20–53	W1
74	June 21	@ Tigers	4–9	Boyd (5–5)	Singer (4–7)	—	20,195	20–54	L1
75	June 22	@ Rays	6–5	Chapman (3–2)	Fairbanks (0–2)	Barlow (9)	10,436	21–54	W1
76	June 23	@ Rays	3–11	Eflin (9–3)	Greinke (1–8)	—	16,189	21–55	L1
77	June 24	@ Rays	9–4	Lyles (1–11)	Chirinos (3–3)	—	20,884	22–55	W1
78	June 25	@ Rays	1–3	Poche (5–2)	Clarke (1–2)	Fairbanks (8)	18,442	22–56	L1
79	June 27	Guardians	1–2	Stephan (4–3)	Barlow (2–4)	Clase (24)	15,718	22–57	L2
80	June 28	Guardians	1–14	Sandlin (4–3)	Cox (0–1)	—	11,978	22–58	L3
81	June 29	Guardians	4–3 (10)	Chapman (4–2)	Clase (1–5)	—	12,414	23–58	W1
82	June 30	Dodgers	3–9	Miller (4–1)	Marsh (0–1)	—	22,006	23–59	L1

July: 9–16 (Home: 7–5; Away: 2–11)

#	Date	Opponent	Score	Win	Loss	Save	Attendance	Record	Streak
83	July 1	Dodgers	6–4	Lynch (2–3)	Urías (5–5)	Barlow (10)	21,004	24–59	W1
84	July 2	Dodgers	9–1	Singer (5–7)	Gonsolin (4–3)	—	19,058	25–59	W2
85	July 3	@ Twins	4–8	Headrick (2–0)	Clarke (1–3)	—	28,218	25–60	L1
86	July 4	@ Twins	3–9	Maeda (2–5)	Greinke (1–9)	—	25,033	25–61	L2
87	July 5	@ Twins	0–5	López (5–5)	Marsh (0–2)	—	19,692	25–62	L3
88	July 6	@ Guardians	1–6	Morgan (4–1)	Garrett (0–1)	—	17,464	25–63	L4
89	July 7	@ Guardians	0–3	Civale (3–2)	Lynch (2–4)	Clase (25)	29,990	25–64	L5
90	July 8	@ Guardians	6–10	Williams (1–1)	Singer (5–8)	—	30,864	25–65	L6
91	July 9	@ Guardians	4–1	Yarbrough (2–4)	Bieber (5–6)	Barlow (11)	25,911	26–65	W1
93rd All-Star Game in Seattle, Washington
—	July 14	Rays	Postponed (rain); Makeup: July 15						
92	July 15 (1)	Rays	1–6	Glasnow (3–3)	Marsh (0–3)	—	15,428	26–66	L1
93	July 15 (2)	Rays	2–4	Poche (7–2)	Hernández (0–5)	Fairbanks (10)	18,052	26–67	L2
94	July 16	Rays	8–4	Singer (6–8)	Eflin (10–5)	—	15,632	27–67	W1
95	July 17	Tigers	2–3	White (2–2)	Clarke (1–4)	Lange (15)	19,440	27–68	L1
96	July 18	Tigers	11–10	Lynch (3–4)	Skubal (0–1)	—	18,448	28–68	W1
97	July 19	Tigers	2–3	Rodríguez (6–5)	Yarbrough (2–5)	Lange (16)	17,903	28–69	L1
98	July 20	Tigers	0–3	Lorenzen (5–6)	Greinke (1–10)	Foley (4)	11,478	28–70	L2
99	July 21	@ Yankees	4–5	Schmidt (6–6)	Marsh (0–4)	Holmes (12)	46,242	28–71	L3
100	July 22	@ Yankees	2–5	Peralta (3–1)	Hernández (0–6)	Holmes (13)	44,401	28–72	L4
101	July 23	@ Yankees	5–8	Severino (2–4)	Lyles (1–12)	—	44,130	28–73	L5
102	July 24	@ Guardians	5–3	Yarbrough (3–5)	Allen (4–3)	Barlow (12)	19,630	29–73	W1
103	July 25	@ Guardians	1–5	Civale (4–2)	Greinke (1–11)	—	22,177	29–74	L1
104	July 26	@ Guardians	3–8	Sandlin (5–3)	Marsh (0–5)	—	26,699	29–75	L2
105	July 28	Twins	8–5 (10)	Clarke (2–4)	Durán (2–5)	—	23,022	30–75	W1
106	July 29	Twins	10–7	Lyles (2–12)	Ober (6–5)	Barlow (13)	20,643	31–75	W2
107	July 30	Twins	2–1	Yarbrough (4–5)	Maeda (2–6)	Hernández (1)	13,752	32–75	W3

August: 9–19 (Home: 5–7; Away: 4–12)

#	Date	Opponent	Score	Win	Loss	Save	Attendance	Record	Streak
108	August 1	Mets	7–6 (10)	Hernández (1–6)	Raley (0–2)	—	16,140	33–75	W4
109	August 2	Mets	4–0	Ragans (3–3)	Senga (7–6)	—	13,630	34–75	W5
110	August 3	Mets	9–2	Singer (7–8)	Carrasco (3–6)	—	11,926	35–75	W6
111	August 4	@ Phillies	7–5	Lyles (3–12)	Nola (9–8)	Cox (1)	36,510	36–75	W7
112	August 5	@ Phillies	6–9	Strahm (7–3)	Zerpa (0–1)	Kimbrel (19)	42,326	36–76	L1
113	August 6	@ Phillies	4–8	Walker (13–4)	Greinke (1–12)	—	43,112	36–77	L2
114	August 7	@ Red Sox	2–6	Jansen (3–5)	Hernández (1–7)	—	32,732	36–78	L3
115	August 8	@ Red Sox	9–3	Singer (8–8)	Crawford (5–6)	—	30,997	37–78	W1
116	August 9	@ Red Sox	3–4	Pivetta (8–6)	Lyles (3–13)	Jansen (25)	35,495	37–79	L1
117	August 10	@ Red Sox	0–2	Paxton (7–3)	Marsh (0–6)	Jansen (26)	31,952	37–80	L2
118	August 11	Cardinals	12–8	Zerpa (1–1)	Wainwright (3–7)	—	26,271	38–80	W1
119	August 12	Cardinals	4–5	Matz (4–7)	Ragans (3–4)	Romero (2)	37,016	38–81	L1
120	August 14	Mariners	7–6	Wittgren (1–0)	Brash (8–4)	—	11,878	39–81	W1
121	August 15	Mariners	8–10 (10)	Muñoz (3–5)	Davidson (1–2)	Saucedo (1)	12,759	39–82	L1
122	August 16	Mariners	5–6	Castillo (9–7)	Coleman (0–1)	Brash (3)	11,091	39–83	L2
123	August 17	Mariners	4–6	Campbell (3–0)	Hernández (1–8)	Brash (4)	10,875	39–84	L3
124	August 18	@ Cubs	4–3	Ragans (4–4)	Taillon (7–8)	Hernández (2)	37,936	40–84	W1
125	August 19	@ Cubs	4–6	Steele (14–3)	Singer (8–9)	Alzolay (17)	39,525	40–85	L1
126	August 20	@ Cubs	3–4	Hendricks (5–6)	Lyles (3–14)	Alzolay (18)	36,949	40–86	L2
127	August 21	@ Athletics	4–6	May (4–4)	Coleman (0–2)	—	3,095	40–87	L3
128	August 22	@ Athletics	4–5	Harris (3–6)	Zerpa (1–2)	May (13)	4,021	40–88	L4
129	August 23	@ Athletics	4–0	Ragans (5–4)	Martínez (0–2)	Hernández (3)	5,075	41–88	W1
130	August 25	@ Mariners	5–7	Campbell (4–0)	Singer (8–10)	Muñoz (9)	45,175	41–89	L1
131	August 26	@ Mariners	2–15	Gilbert (12–5)	Lyles (3–15)	—	41,744	41–90	L2
132	August 27	@ Mariners	2–3	Castillo (11–7)	Marsh (0–7)	Muñoz (10)	38,829	41–91	L3
133	August 28	Pirates	0–5	Oviedo (8–13)	Greinke (1–13)	—	11,610	41–92	L4
134	August 29	Pirates	3–6	Ortiz (3–4)	Hernández (1–9)	—	11,233	41–93	L5
135	August 30	Pirates	1–4	Jackson (1–1)	Zerpa (1–3)	Bednar (29)	10,592	41–94	L6

September/October: 15–12 (Home: 10–5; Away: 5–7)

#	Date	Opponent	Score	Win	Loss	Save	Attendance	Record	Streak
136	September 1	Red Sox	13–2	Lyles (4–15)	Paxton (7–5)	—	15,470	42–94	W1
137	September 2	Red Sox	5–9	Houck (4–8)	Marsh (0–8)	Pivetta (1)	20,527	42–95	L1
138	September 3	Red Sox	3–7	Sale (6–3)	Greinke (1–14)	—	15,785	42–96	L2
139	September 4	White Sox	12–1	Ragans (6–4)	Scholtens (1–7)	—	10,646	43–96	W1
140	September 5	White Sox	7–6	Kowar (1–0)	Santos (2–2)	—	10,395	44–96	W2
141	September 6	White Sox	4–6	Toussaint (3–7)	Lyles (4–16)	Shaw (2)	11,046	44–97	L1
142	September 8	@ Blue Jays	4–5	Green (2–0)	Hernández (1–10)	Romano (33)	26,493	44–98	L2
143	September 9	@ Blue Jays	1–5	Gausman (11–8)	Greinke (1–15)	—	41,443	44–99	L3
144	September 10	@ Blue Jays	2–5	Berríos (10–10)	Clarke (2–5)	Romano (34)	35,275	44–100	L4
—	September 11	@ White Sox	Postponed (rain); Makeup: September 12						
146	September 12 (1)	@ White Sox	2–6	Cease (7–7)	Singer (8–11)	Santos (5)	see 2nd game	44–101	L5
146	September 12 (2)	@ White Sox	11–10	Clarke (3–5)	García (0–1)	Hernández (4)	14,824	45–101	W1
147	September 13	@ White Sox	7–1	Marsh (1–8)	Clevinger (7–8)	—	15,593	46–101	W2
148	September 15	Astros	4–2	Zerpa (2–3)	Javier (9–4)	Clarke (1)	15,465	47–101	W3
149	September 16	Astros	10–8	McArthur (1–0)	Neris (6–3)	Clarke (2)	19,557	48–101	W4
150	September 17	Astros	1–7	Valdez (12–10)	Lyles (4–17)	—	15,311	48–102	L1
151	September 18	Guardians	6–4	Kowar (2–0)	Stephan (6–7)	McArthur (1)	9,736	49–102	W1
152	September 19	Guardians	7–6	Marsh (2–8)	Allen (7–8)	Snider (1)	15,254	50–102	W2
153	September 20	Guardians	6–2	Zerpa (3–3)	Giolito (8–14)	—	12,162	51–102	W3
154	September 22	@ Astros	7–5	Ragans (7–4)	Valdez (12–11)	McArthur (2)	41,033	52–102	W4
155	September 23	@ Astros	3–2	Lyles (5–17)	France (11–6)	Clarke (3)	41,692	53–102	W5
156	September 24	@ Astros	6–5	Marsh (3–8)	Brown (11–13)	McArthur (3)	41,438	54–102	W6
157	September 26	@ Tigers	3–6	Foley (3–3)	Clarke (3–6)	—	13,903	54–103	L1
—	September 27	@ Tigers	Suspended (rain); Rescheduled to September 28						
158	September 28	@ Tigers	0–8	Díaz (1–0)	Bowlan (0–1)	—	see 2nd game	54–104	L2
159	September 28	@ Tigers	3–7	Cisnero (3–4)	Ragans (7–5)	—	13,326	54–105	L3
160	September 29	Yankees	12–5	Lyles (6–17)	Rodón (3–8)	—	18,374	55–105	W1
161	September 30	Yankees	2–5	Montas (1–0)	Marsh (3–9)	Holmes (24)	22,665	55–106	L1
162	October 1	Yankees	5–2	Greinke (2–15)	King (4–8)	McArthur (4)	20,662	56–106	W1

== Player statistics ==
= Indicates team leader

= Indicates league leader

=== Batting ===
Note: G = Games played; AB = At bats; R = Runs; H = Hits; 2B = Doubles; 3B = Triples; HR = Home runs; RBI = Runs batted in; SB = Stolen bases; BB = Walks; AVG = Batting average; SLG = Slugging average

Player	G	AB	R	H	2B	3B	HR	RBI	SB	BB	AVG	SLG
Bobby Witt Jr.	158	641	97	177	28	11	30	96	49	40	.276	.495
Salvador Pérez	140	538	59	137	21	0	23	80	0	19	.255	.422
MJ Melendez	148	533	65	125	29	5	16	56	6	62	.235	.398
Maikel García	123	464	59	126	20	4	4	50	23	38	.272	.358
Michael Massey	129	428	42	98	18	1	15	55	6	24	.229	.381
Edward Olivares	107	354	47	93	23	4	12	36	11	22	.263	.452
Nick Pratto	95	306	33	71	16	0	7	35	1	29	.232	.353
Drew Waters	98	302	40	69	11	5	8	32	16	27	.228	.377
Kyle Isbel	91	292	45	70	22	2	5	34	7	17	.240	.380
Vinnie Pasquantino	61	231	24	57	17	0	9	26	0	25	.247	.437
Freddy Fermín	70	217	26	61	10	1	9	32	0	13	.281	.461
Matt Duffy	78	191	17	48	8	0	2	16	1	12	.251	.325
Nicky Lopez	68	160	19	34	5	3	0	13	4	21	.213	.281
Nelson Velázquez	40	133	27	31	4	0	14	28	0	11	.233	.579
Dairon Blanco	69	124	19	32	7	4	3	18	24	10	.258	.452
Jackie Bradley Jr.	43	105	10	14	5	0	1	6	0	5	.133	.210
Hunter Dozier	29	82	8	15	2	1	2	9	2	8	.183	.305
Nick Loftin	19	62	10	20	5	1	0	10	2	4	.323	.435
Samad Taylor	31	60	11	12	2	1	0	4	8	7	.200	.267
Franmil Reyes	19	59	5	11	0	0	2	7	0	4	.186	.288
Matt Beaty	26	56	7	13	4	0	0	3	0	6	.232	.304
Nate Eaton	28	53	2	4	0	0	0	1	3	2	.075	.075
Logan Porter	11	31	4	6	1	0	1	3	0	5	.194	.323
Tyler Cropley	2	6	0	1	0	0	0	1	0	0	.167	.167
Totals	162	5428	676	1325	258	43	163	651	163	411	.244	.398
Rank in AL	—	13	10	11	11	1	14	10	1	14	9	10

Source:Baseball Reference

=== Pitching ===
Note: W = Wins; L = Losses; ERA = Earned run average; G = Games pitched; GS = Games started; SV = Saves; IP = Innings pitched; H = Hits allowed; R = Runs allowed; ER = Earned runs allowed; BB = Walks allowed; SO = Strikeouts

Player	W	L	ERA	G	GS	SV	IP	H	R	ER	BB	SO
Jordan Lyles	6	17	6.28	31	31	0	177.2	176	130	124	45	120
Brady Singer	8	11	5.52	29	29	0	159.2	182	102	98	49	133
Zack Greinke	2	15	5.06	30	27	0	142.1	158	82	80	23	97
Alec Marsh	3	9	5.69	17	8	0	74.1	77	50	47	39	85
Cole Ragans	5	2	2.64	12	12	0	71.2	50	23	21	27	89
Carlos Hernández	1	10	5.27	67	4	4	70.0	62	43	41	31	77
Taylor Clarke	3	6	5.95	58	2	3	59.0	71	42	39	24	65
Daniel Lynch IV	3	4	4.64	9	9	0	52.1	50	29	27	16	34
Ryan Yarbrough	4	5	4.24	14	7	0	51.0	52	24	24	9	29
Brad Keller	3	4	4.57	11	9	0	45.1	42	26	23	45	31
Ángel Zerpa	3	3	4.85	15	3	0	42.2	46	24	23	8	36
José Cuas	3	0	4.54	45	1	0	41.2	46	21	21	21	52
Scott Barlow	2	4	5.35	38	0	13	38.2	38	26	23	22	47
Austin Cox	0	1	4.54	24	3	1	35.2	28	20	18	17	33
Aroldis Chapman	4	2	2.45	31	0	2	29.1	16	10	8	20	53
Nick Wittgren	1	0	4.97	27	0	0	29.0	30	17	16	11	18
Jackson Kowar	2	0	6.43	23	0	0	28.0	34	24	20	20	29
Mike Mayers	1	2	6.15	6	2	0	26.1	34	19	18	10	17
Amir Garrett	0	1	3.33	27	0	0	24.1	22	11	9	20	28
James McArthur	1	0	4.63	18	2	4	23.1	20	12	12	2	23
Collin Snider	0	0	4.87	20	1	1	20.1	24	12	11	13	11
Max Castillo	0	1	4.43	7	0	0	20.1	20	10	10	9	10
Josh Staumont	0	0	5.40	21	1	0	20.0	16	12	12	13	24
Tucker Davidson	0	1	5.03	20	1	0	19.2	20	12	11	8	15
Dylan Coleman	0	2	8.84	23	1	0	18.1	18	19	18	19	21
Josh Taylor	1	3	8.15	17	1	0	17.2	22	17	16	9	26
Kris Bubic	0	2	3.94	3	3	0	16.0	19	7	7	2	16
Jonathan Heasley	0	0	7.20	12	0	0	15.0	17	13	12	2	9
Steven Cruz	0	0	4.97	10	4	0	12.2	11	7	7	11	15
Taylor Hearn	0	0	8.22	8	0	0	7.2	12	7	7	2	8
Brooks Kriske	0	0	4.05	4	0	0	6.2	3	3	3	4	6
John McMillon	0	0	2.25	4	0	0	4.0	1	1	1	0	8
Jonathan Bowlan	0	1	3.00	2	1	0	3.0	5	1	1	0	3
Anthony Veneziano	0	0	0.00	2	0	0	2.1	2	2	0	2	1
Matt Duffy	0	0	4.50	2	0	0	2.0	3	1	1	0	0
Nate Eaton	0	0	0.00	1	0	0	1.0	2	0	0	0	1
Totals	56	106	5.17	162	162	28	1409.0	1429	859	809	553	1270
Rank in AL	14	2	14	—	—	14	15	14	14	14	12	15

Source:Baseball Reference

== Farm system ==
Level	Team	League	Manager
Triple-A	Omaha Storm Chasers	International League	Mike Jirschele
Double-A	Northwest Arkansas Naturals	Texas League	Tommy Shields
High-A	Quad Cities River Bandits	Midwest League	Brooks Conrad
Single-A	Columbia Fireflies	Carolina League	Tony Peña Jr.
Rookie	ACL Royals	Arizona Complex League	Jesus Azuaje
Rookie	DSL Royals Gold	Dominican Summer League	Ramon Martinez
Rookie	DSL Royals Blue	Dominican Summer League	Sergio De Luna
