= 2022 Kansas City Royals season =

2022 Kansas City Royals
- League: American League
- Division: Central
- Ballpark: Kauffman Stadium
- City: Kansas City, Missouri
- Record: 65–97 (.401)
- Divisional place: 5th
- Owners: John Sherman
- General managers: Dayton Moore
- Managers: Mike Matheny
- Television: Bally Sports Kansas City (Ryan Lefebvre, Jeff Montgomery, Rex Hudler, Steve Physioc)
- Radio: KCSP 610 AM (Denny Matthews, Steve Stewart, Rex Hudler, Ryan Lefebvre, Steve Physioc, Jeff Montgomery)

The 2022 Kansas City Royals season was the 54th season for the franchise, and their 50th at Kauffman Stadium.

On December 2, 2021, Commissioner of Baseball Rob Manfred announced a lockout of players, following expiration of the collective bargaining agreement (CBA) between the league and the Major League Baseball Players Association (MLBPA). On March 10, 2022, MLB and the MLBPA agreed to a new collective bargaining agreement, thus ending the lockout. Opening Day was played on April 7. Although MLB previously announced that several series would be cancelled due to the lockout, the agreement provided for a 162-game season, with originally canceled games made up via doubleheaders.

On September 13, the Royals were officially eliminated from playoff contention for the seventh consecutive season.

Overall, the team finished with a 65–97 record (.401), landing them in last place in the American League Central and in second to last place in the American League, winning more games than only the Oakland Athletics, whose record was 60-102 (.370).

== Offseason ==
=== Lockout ===
The expiration of the league's collective bargaining agreement (CBA) with the Major League Baseball Players Association occurred on December 1, 2021, with no new agreement in place. As a result, the team owners voted unanimously to lockout the players stopping all free agency and trades.

The parties came to an agreement on a new CBA on March 10, 2022.

=== Rule changes ===
Pursuant to the new CBA, several new rules were instituted for the 2022 season. The National League will adopt the designated hitter full-time, a draft lottery will be implemented, the postseason will expand from ten teams to twelve, and advertising patches will appear on player uniforms and helmets for the first time.

== Roster ==
2022 Kansas City Royals
Roster
Pitchers: 69 Albert Abreu; 58 Scott Barlow; 57 Ronald Bolaños; 59 Jake Brentz; 50 Kris Bubic; 60 Max Castillo; 45 Taylor Clarke; 65 Dylan Coleman; 74 José Cuas; 24 Amir Garrett; 23 Zack Greinke; 60 Foster Griffin; 49 Jon Heasley; 43 Carlos Hernández; 56 Brad Keller; 37 Jackson Kowar; 52 Daniel Lynch; 73 Daniel Mengden; 41 Wyatt Mills; 36 Anthony Misiewicz; 38 Joel Payamps; 46 Matt Peacock; 51 Brady Singer; 40 Collin Snider; 67 Gabe Speier; 63 Josh Staumont; 68 Arodys Vizcaíno; 26 Luke Weaver; 61 Ángel Zerpa	Catchers: 78 Freddy Fermín; 36 Cam Gallagher; 1 MJ Melendez; 13 Salvador Pérez; 48 Sebastian Rivero; Infielders: 17 Hunter Dozier; 11 Maikel García; 8 Nicky Lopez; 19 Michael Massey; 15 Whit Merrifield; 27 Adalberto Mondesí; 9 Vinnie Pasquantino; 32 Nick Pratto; 26 Emmanuel Rivera; 41 Carlos Santana; 7 Bobby Witt Jr.	Outfielders: 16 Andrew Benintendi; 44 Dairon Blanco; 18 Nate Eaton; 75 Brewer Hicklen; 28 Kyle Isbel; 66 Ryan O'Hearn; 14 Edward Olivares; 55 Brent Rooker; 2 Michael A. Taylor; 6 Drew Waters	Manager: 22 Mike Matheny; Coaches: 44 Terry Bradshaw (baseball) (hitting); 34 Larry Carter (bullpen); 77 Keoni DeRenne (assistant hitting); -- Bill Duplissea (replay coordinator); 80 Ryan Eigsti (bullpen catcher); 21 Cal Eldred (pitching); 12 Pedro Grifol (bench); 39 Damon Hollins (first base); 18 Rusty Kuntz (coach); 47 John Mabry (coach); -- Parker Morin (bullpen catcher); 25 Vance Wilson (third base); 31 Alec Zumwalt (hitting)

== Regular season ==
=== American League Central ===
AL Central
Team	W	L	Pct.	GB	Home	Road
Cleveland Guardians	92	70	.568	—	46‍–‍35	46‍–‍35
Chicago White Sox	81	81	.500	11	37‍–‍44	44‍–‍37
Minnesota Twins	78	84	.481	14	46‍–‍35	32‍–‍49
Detroit Tigers	66	96	.407	26	36‍–‍46	30‍–‍50
Kansas City Royals	65	97	.401	27	39‍–‍42	26‍–‍55

=== American League Wild Card ===
Division leaders
Team	W	L	Pct.
Houston Astros	106	56	.654
New York Yankees	99	63	.611
Cleveland Guardians	92	70	.568

Wild Card teams (Top 3 teams qualify for postseason)
Team	W	L	Pct.	GB
Toronto Blue Jays	92	70	.568	+6
Seattle Mariners	90	72	.556	+4
Tampa Bay Rays	86	76	.531	—
Baltimore Orioles	83	79	.512	3
Chicago White Sox	81	81	.500	5
Minnesota Twins	78	84	.481	8
Boston Red Sox	78	84	.481	8
Los Angeles Angels	73	89	.451	13
Texas Rangers	68	94	.420	18
Detroit Tigers	66	96	.407	20
Kansas City Royals	65	97	.401	21
Oakland Athletics	60	102	.370	26

=== Record against opponents ===
2022 American League record Source: MLB Standings Grid – 2022
Team	BAL	BOS	CWS	CLE	DET	HOU	KC	LAA	MIN	NYY	OAK	SEA	TB	TEX	TOR	NL
Baltimore	—	9–10	5–2	3–3	1–5	4–3	4–3	6–1	3–4	7–12	3–4	2–4	9–10	6–0	9–10	12–8
Boston	10–9	—	2–4	5–2	5–1	4–2	3–4	4–3	3–4	6–13	5–1	6–1	7–12	6–1	3–16	9–11
Chicago	2–5	4–2	—	7–12	12–7	3–4	9–10	3–4	9–10	3–4	5–2	4–2	4–2	3–4	2–4	11–9
Cleveland	3–3	2–5	12–7	—	10–9	3–4	12–7	3–4	13–6	1–5	6–1	1–6	4–2	5–1	5–2	12–8
Detroit	5–1	1–5	7–12	9–10	—	0–7	10–9	3–3	8–11	1–5	2–5	1–6	2–5	4–3	2–5	11–9
Houston	3–4	2–4	4–3	4–3	7–0	—	5–2	13–6	6–0	5–2	12–7	12–7	5–1	14–5	2–4	12–8
Kansas City	3–4	4–3	10–9	7–12	9–10	2–5	—	3–3	7–12	1–6	3–3	2–4	3–4	2–4	2–5	7–13
Los Angeles	1–6	3–4	4–3	4–3	3–3	6–13	3–3	—	4–2	2–4	12–7	10–9	2–5	9–10	3–4	7–13
Minnesota	4–3	4–3	10–9	6–13	11–8	0–6	12–7	2–4	—	2–5	5–1	4–3	4–2	2–5	4–3	8–12
New York	12–7	13–6	4–3	5–1	5–1	2–5	6–1	4–2	5–2	—	5–2	2–4	11–8	4–3	11–8	10–10
Oakland	4–3	1–5	2–5	1–6	5–2	7–12	3–3	7–12	1–5	2–5	—	8–11	3–4	8–11	3–3	5–15
Seattle	4–2	1–6	2–4	6–1	6–1	7–12	4–2	9–10	3–4	4–2	11–8	—	2–5	14–5	5–2	12–8
Tampa Bay	10–9	12–7	2–4	2–4	5–2	1–5	4–3	5–2	2–4	8–11	4–3	5–2	—	4–3	10–9	12–8
Texas	0–6	1–6	4–3	1–5	3–4	5–14	4–2	10–9	5–2	3–4	11–8	5–14	3–4	—	2–4	11–9
Toronto	10–9	16–3	4–2	2–5	5–2	4–2	5–2	4–3	3–4	8–11	3–3	2–5	9–10	4–2	—	13–7

Updated with the results of all games through October 5, 2022.

== Game log ==
2022 Game Log: 65–97 (Home: 39–40; Away: 26–57)
April: 7–12 (Home: 5–6; Away: 2–6)

#	Date	Opponent	Score	Win	Loss	Save	Stadium	Attendance	Record	Streak
1	April 7	Guardians	3–1	**Barlow** (1–0)	McKenzie (0–1)	—	**Kauffman Stadium**	28,459	1–0	W1
2	April 9	Guardians	1–0 (10)	**Snider** (1–0)	Clase (0–1)	—	**Kauffman Stadium**	17,103	2–0	W2
3	April 10	Guardians	3–17	Quantrill (1–0)	**Bubic** (0–1)	—	**Kauffman Stadium**	20,165	2–1	L1
4	April 11	Guardians	7–10	Allen (1–0)	**Brentz** (0–1)	—	**Kauffman Stadium**	8,971	2–2	L2
5	April 12	@ Cardinals	5–6	Hicks (1–0)	**Lynch** (0–1)	Gallegos (1)	Busch Stadium	40,398	2–3	L3
—	April 13	@ Cardinals	PPD, RAIN; rescheduled for MAY 2							
6	April 14	Tigers	2–4	Jiménez (1–0)	**Brentz** (0–1)	Soto (2)	**Kauffman Stadium**	9,595	2–4	L4
7	April 15	Tigers	1–2	Barnes (1–0)	**Keller** (0–1)	Fulmer (1)	**Kauffman Stadium**	16,720	2–5	L5
8	April 16	Tigers	3–1	**Snider** (1–0)	Vest (0–1)	**Staumont** (1)	**Kauffman Stadium**	19,022	3–5	W1
—	April 17	Tigers	PPD, RAIN; rescheduled for JULY 11							
9	April 19	Twins	4–3	**Garrett** (1–0)	Duffey (0–2)	**Staumont** (2)	**Kauffman Stadium**	10,303	4–5	W2
10	April 20	Twins	2–0	**Lynch** (1–1)	Paddack (0–2)	**Barlow** (1)	**Kauffman Stadium**	8,969	5–5	W3
11	April 21	Twins	0–1	Ryan (2–1)	**Greinke** (0–1)	Pagán (1)	**Kauffman Stadium**	15,540	5–6	L1
12	April 22	@ Mariners	1–4	Flexen (1–2)	**Keller** (0–2)	Muñoz (1)	T-Mobile Park	24,206	5–7	L2
13	April 23	@ Mariners	7–13	Castillo (1–0)	**Brentz** (0–3)	—	T-Mobile Park	28,583	5–8	L3
14	April 24	@ Mariners	4–5 (12)	Ramírez (1–0)	**Payamps** (0–1)	—	T-Mobile Park	28,548	5–9	L4
15	April 26	@ White Sox	6–0	**Lynch** (2–1)	Keuchel (1–2)	—	Guaranteed Rate Field	12,031	6–9	W1
16	April 27	@ White Sox	3–7	Sousa (1–0)	**Snider** (2–1)	Graveman (1)	Guaranteed Rate Field	12,363	6–10	L1
17	April 28	@ White Sox	5–2 (10)	**Barlow** (2–0)	Bummer (0–1)	**Clarke** (1)	Guaranteed Rate Field	11,242	7–10	W1
18	April 29	Yankees	2–12 (8)	Cortés Jr. (1–0)	**Bubic** (0–2)	—	**Kauffman Stadium**	16,460	7–11	L1
19	April 30	Yankees	0–3	Cole (2–0)	**Hernández** (0–1)	Chapman (5)	**Kauffman Stadium**	23,965	7–12	L2

May: 9–20 (Home: 3–7; Away: 6–13)

#	Date	Opponent	Score	Win	Loss	Save	Stadium	Attendance	Record	Streak
20	May 1	Yankees	4–6	Schmidt (2–2)	**Coleman** (0–1)	Chapman (6)	**Kauffman Stadium**	19,704	7–13	L3
21	May 2	@ Cardinals	0–1	Matz (3–1)	**Greinke** (0–2)	Gallegos (5)	Busch Stadium	33,963	7–14	L4
22	May 3	Cardinals	7–1	**Keller** (1–2)	Hudson (2–2)	—	**Kauffman Stadium**	18,788	8–14	W1
23	May 4	Cardinals	0–10	Wainwright (3–3)	**Bubic** (0–3)	—	**Kauffman Stadium**	12,774	8–15	L1
—	May 6	@ Orioles	PPD, RAIN; rescheduled for MAY 8							
—	May 7	@ Orioles	PPD, RAIN; rescheduled for MAY 9							
24	May 8 (1)	@ Orioles	6–4	**Clarke** (1–0)	López (3–2)	**Barlow** (2)	Camden Yards	see 2nd game	9–15	W1
25	May 8 (2)	@ Orioles	2–4	Zimmermann (2–1)	**Lynch** (2–2)	Tate (1)	Camden Yards	19,893	9–16	L1
26	May 9	@ Orioles	1–6	Wells (1–2)	**Hernández** (0–2)	—	Camden Yards	9,438	9–17	L2
27	May 10	@ Rangers	4–6	Pérez (1–2)	**Keller** (1–3)	Barlow (5)	Globe Life Field	15,407	9–18	L3
28	May 11	@ Rangers	8–2	**Payamps** (1–0)	Allard (0–2)	—	Globe Life Field	15,561	10–18	W1
29	May 12	@ Rangers	1–3	Hearn (2–2)	**Heasley** (0–1)	Barlow (6)	Globe Life Field	14,994	10–19	L1
30	May 13	@ Rockies	14–10	**Coleman** (1–1)	Freeland (1–4)	**Barlow** (3)	Coors Field	35,176	11–19	W1
31	May 14	@ Rockies	4–10	Márquez (1–3)	**Hernández** (0–3)	—	Coors Field	40,534	11–20	L1
32	May 15	@ Rockies	8–7	**Staumont** (1–0)	Bard (1–1)	**Barlow** (4)	Coors Field	34,505	12–20	W1
33	May 16	White Sox	3–5 (10)	Burr (1–1)	**Barlow** (2–1)	Hendriks (10)	**Kauffman Stadium**	12,441	12–21	L1
34	May 17 (1)	White Sox	0–3	Cease (4–1)	**Heasley** (0–2)	Hendriks (11)	**Kauffman Stadium**	9,168	12–22	L2
35	May 17 (2)	White Sox	2–1	**Singer** (1–0)	Martin (0–1)	**Staumont** (3)	**Kauffman Stadium**	11,684	13–22	W1
36	May 18	White Sox	6–2	**Snider** (3–1)	López (4–1)	—	**Kauffman Stadium**	13,504	14–22	W2
37	May 19	White Sox	4–7	Sousa (2–0)	**Speier** (0–1)	Hendriks (12)	**Kauffman Stadium**	11,784	14–23	L1
38	May 20	Twins	4–6	Smeltzer (1–0)	**Lynch** (2–3)	Pagán (6)	**Kauffman Stadium**	25,337	14–24	L2
39	May 21	Twins	2–9	Ryan (5–2)	**Keller** (1–4)	—	**Kauffman Stadium**	17,893	14–25	L3
40	May 22	Twins	6–7	Duffey (2–2)	**Staumont** (1–1)	Durán (3)	**Kauffman Stadium**	15,482	14–26	L4
41	May 23	@ Diamondbacks	5–9	Wendelken (1–1)	**Greinke** (0–3)	—	Chase Field	14,629	14–27	L5
42	May 24	@ Diamondbacks	6–8	Mantiply (2–0)	**Clarke** (1–1)	Melancon (10)	Chase Field	12,616	14–28	L6
43	May 26	@ Twins	3–2	**Staumont** (2–1)	Duffey (2–3)	**Barlow** (5)	Target Field	17,657	15–28	W1
44	May 27	@ Twins	7–10	Megill (1–1)	**Keller** (1–5)	Pagán (7)	Target Field	21,841	15–29	L1
45	May 28	@ Twins	7–3	**Singer** (2–0)	Archer (0–2)	—	Target Field	22,249	16–29	W1
46	May 29	@ Twins	3–7	Gray (3–1)	**Greinke** (0–4)	—	Target Field	27,195	16–30	L1
47	May 30	@ Guardians	3–7	Sandlin (4–2)	**Snider** (3–2)	—	Progressive Field	15,271	16–31	L2
48	May 31	@ Guardians	3–8	Quantrill (2–3)	**Lynch** (2–4)	—	Progressive Field	10,519	16–32	L3

June: 11–15 (Home: 6–10; Away: 5–5)

#	Date	Opponent	Score	Win	Loss	Save	Stadium	Attendance	Record	Streak
49	June 1	@ Guardians	0–4	Pilkington (1–0)	**Keller** (1–6)	—	Progressive Field	12,895	16–33	L4
50	June 3	Astros	3–10	Urquidy (5–2)	**Singer** (2–1)	—	**Kauffman Stadium**	22,516	16–34	L5
51	June 4	Astros	6–0	**Snider** (4–2)	García (3–4)	—	**Kauffman Stadium**	14,663	17–34	W1
52	June 5	Astros	4–7	Valdez (6–2)	**Heasley** (0–3)	Montero (4)	**Kauffman Stadium**	12,776	17–35	L1
53	June 6	Blue Jays	0–8	Stripling (2–1)	**Lynch** (2–5)	—	**Kauffman Stadium**	10,889	17–36	L2
54	June 7	Blue Jays	0–7	Manoah (7–1)	**Keller** (1–7)	—	**Kauffman Stadium**	15,103	17–37	L3
55	June 8	Blue Jays	8–4	**Singer** (3–1)	Richards (2–1)	—	**Kauffman Stadium**	12,196	18–37	W1
56	June 9	Orioles	7–5	**Payamps** (2–1)	Lyles (3–5)	**Barlow** (6)	**Kauffman Stadium**	15,594	19–37	W2
57	June 10	Orioles	8–1	**Heasley** (1–3)	Zimmermann (2–5)	—	**Kauffman Stadium**	17,650	20–37	W3
58	June 11	Orioles	4–6	Wells (3–4)	**Lynch** (2–6)	López (8)	**Kauffman Stadium**	15,134	20–38	L1
59	June 12	Orioles	7–10	Kremer (1–1)	**Keller** (1–8)	Pérez (1)	**Kauffman Stadium**	15,037	20–39	L2
60	June 13	@ Giants	2–6	Wood (4–5)	**Garrett** (1–1)	—	Oracle Park	22,185	20–40	L3
61	June 14	@ Giants	2–4	Webb (6–2)	**Bubic** (0–4)	Doval (9)	Oracle Park	24,386	20–41	L4
62	June 15	@ Giants	3–2	**Cuas** (1–0)	Brebbia (3–1)	**Barlow** (7)	Oracle Park	25,527	21–41	W1
63	June 17	@ Athletics	5–1	**Lynch** (3–6)	Montas (3–7)	—	Oakland Coliseum	8,772	22–41	W2
64	June 18	@ Athletics	2–0	**Keller** (2–8)	Irvin (2–4)	**Barlow** (8)	Oakland Coliseum	10,936	23–41	W3
65	June 19	@ Athletics	0–4	Koenig (1–2)	**Singer** (3–2)	—	Oakland Coliseum	14,341	23–42	L1
66	June 20	@ Angels	6–2	**Bubic** (1–4)	Syndergaard (4–6)	—	Angel Stadium	22,234	24–42	W1
67	June 21	@ Angels	12–11 (11)	**Coleman** (2–1)	Quijada (0–2)	**Mengden** (1)	Angel Stadium	20,189	25–42	W2
68	June 22	@ Angels	0–5	Ohtani (6–2)	**Lynch** (3–7)	—	Angel Stadium	34,792	25–43	L1
69	June 24	Athletics	3–1	**Greinke** (1–4)	Irvin (2–5)	**Barlow** (9)	**Kauffman Stadium**	25,077	26–43	W1
70	June 25	Athletics	7–9	Jackson (2–2)	**Keller** (1–9)	Trivino (3)	**Kauffman Stadium**	13,543	26–44	L1
71	June 26	Athletics	3–5	Moll (3–0)	**Singer** (3–3)	Trivino (4)	**Kauffman Stadium**	24,820	26–45	L2
72	June 27	Rangers	4–10	Pérez (6–2)	**Bubic** (1–5)	—	**Kauffman Stadium**	12,876	26–46	L3
73	June 28	Rangers	3–8	Gray (4–3)	**Heasley** (1–4)	—	**Kauffman Stadium**	19,593	26–47	L4
74	June 29	Rangers	2–1	**Greinke** (2–4)	Dunning (1–6)	**Barlow** (10)	**Kauffman Stadium**	11,391	27–47	W1

July: 13–15 (Home: 8–5; Away: 5–10)

#	Date	Opponent	Score	Win	Loss	Save	Stadium	Attendance	Record	Streak
75	July 1	@ Tigers	3–1	**Keller** (3–9)	Pineda (1–3)	**Barlow** (11)	Comerica Park	24,349	28–47	W2
76	July 2	@ Tigers	3–4	Jiménez (3–0)	**Payamps** (2–2)	—	Comerica Park	23,502	28–48	L1
77	July 3	@ Tigers	7–4	**Cuas** (2–0)	Skubal (5–7)	**Barlow** (12)	Comerica Park	21,625	29–48	W1
78	July 4	@ Astros	6–7	Stanek (1–0)	**Barlow** (2–2)	—	Minute Maid Park	33,936	29–49	L1
79	July 5	@ Astros	7–9	García (7–5)	**Greinke** (2–5)	Montero (6)	Minute Maid Park	28,762	29–50	L2
80	July 6	@ Astros	7–4	**Keller** (4–9)	Javier (6–4)	**Barlow** (13)	Minute Maid Park	26,534	30–50	W1
81	July 7	@ Astros	2–5	Verlander (11–3)	**Bubic** (1–6)	Pressly (18)	Minute Maid Park	36,067	30–51	L1
82	July 8	Guardians	4–3	**Barlow** (3–2)	Hentges (2–1)	—	**Kauffman Stadium**	19,611	31–51	W1
83	July 9	Guardians	1–13	McKenzie (6–6)	**Heasley** (1–5)	—	**Kauffman Stadium**	17,024	31–52	L1
84	July 10	Guardians	5–1	**Greinke** (3–5)	Plesac (2–7)	—	**Kauffman Stadium**	13,284	32–52	W1
85	July 11 (1)	Tigers	3–1	**Keller** (5–9)	Pineda (2–4)	**Barlow** (14)	**Kauffman Stadium**	11,084	33–52	W2
86	July 11 (2)	Tigers	7–3	**Zerpa** (1–0)	Faedo (1–5)	—	**Kauffman Stadium**	16,202	34–52	W3
87	July 12	Tigers	5–7	Brieske (3–6)	**Cuas** (2–1)	Soto (18)	**Kauffman Stadium**	14,541	34–53	L1
88	July 13	Tigers	5–2	**Singer** (4–3)	Skubal (6–8)	**Barlow** (15)	**Kauffman Stadium**	11,016	35–53	W1
89	July 14	@ Blue Jays	3–1	**Zerpa** (2–0)	Gausman (6–7)	**Barlow** (16)	Rogers Centre	24,426	36–53	W2
90	July 15	@ Blue Jays	1–8	Manoah (10–4)	**Greinke** (3–6)	—	Rogers Centre	26,422	36–54	L1
91	July 16	@ Blue Jays	5–6 (10)	Romano (3–2)	**Payamps** (2–3)	—	Rogers Centre	40,135	36–55	L2
92	July 17	@ Blue Jays	2–4	Mayza (3–0)	**Mills** (0–1)	Romano (20)	Rogers Centre	36,681	36–56	L3
**92nd All-Star Game in Los Angeles, California**
93	July 22	Rays	3–7	Rasmussen (6–3)	**Keller** (5–10)	—	**Kauffman Stadium**	22,102	36–57	L4
94	July 23	Rays	6–3	**Barlow** (4–2)	Yarbrough (0–5)	—	**Kauffman Stadium**	20,668	37–57	W1
95	July 24	Rays	4–2	**Bubic** (2–6)	Raley (1–1)	**Clarke** (2)	**Kauffman Stadium**	12,336	38–57	W2
96	July 25	Angels	7–0	**Garrett** (2–1)	Syndergaard (5–8)	—	**Kauffman Stadium**	16,616	39–57	W3
97	July 26	Angels	0–6	Suárez (2–4)	**Zerpa** (2–1)	—	**Kauffman Stadium**	20,834	39–58	L1
98	July 27	Angels	0–4	Junk (1–0)	**Keller** (5–11)	—	**Kauffman Stadium**	12,596	39–59	L2
99	July 28	@ Yankees	0–1	Holmes (5–1)	**Barlow** (4–3)	—	Yankee Stadium	43,836	39–60	L3
100	July 29	@ Yankees	5–11	Abreu (2–0)	**Barlow** (4–4)	—	Yankee Stadium	42,481	39–61	L4
101	July 30	@ Yankees	2–8	Cortés Jr. (9–3)	**Heasley** (1–6)	Schmidt (2)	Yankee Stadium	44,081	39–62	L5
102	July 31	@ Yankees	8–6	**Clarke** (2–1)	Holmes (5–2)	—	Yankee Stadium	45,341	40–62	W1

August: 13–16 (Home: 10–7; Away: 3–9)

#	Date	Opponent	Score	Win	Loss	Save	Stadium	Attendance	Record	Streak
103	August 1	@ White Sox	2–1	**Lynch** (4–7)	Kopech (4–7)	**Barlow** (17)	Guaranteed Rate Field	17,500	41–62	W2
104	August 2	@ White Sox	2–9	Giolito (7–6)	**Keller** (5–12)	—	Guaranteed Rate Field	24,361	41–63	L1
105	August 3	@ White Sox	1–4	Lynn (2–4)	**Singer** (4–4)	Hendriks (21)	Guaranteed Rate Field	19,753	41–64	L2
106	August 4	Red Sox	7–3	**Clarke** (3–1)	Hernández (0–1)	—	**Kauffman Stadium**	18,970	42–64	W1
107	August 5	Red Sox	4–7	Winckowski (5–5)	**Greinke** (3–7)	—	**Kauffman Stadium**	21,246	42–65	L1
108	August 6	Red Sox	5–4	**Coleman** (3–1)	Whitlock (2–2)	—	**Kauffman Stadium**	19,136	43–65	W1
109	August 7	Red Sox	13–5	**Keller** (6–12)	Crawford (3–4)	—	**Kauffman Stadium**	14,949	44–65	W2
110	August 9 (1)	White Sox	4–2	**Singer** (5–4)	Lynn (2–5)	**Cuas** (1)	**Kauffman Stadium**	see 2nd game	45–65	W3
111	August 9 (2)	White Sox	2–3	Martin (2–3)	**Heasley** (1–7)	Hendriks (23)	**Kauffman Stadium**	12,700	45–66	L1
112	August 10	White Sox	8–3	**Staumont** (3–1)	Diekman (5–2)	—	**Kauffman Stadium**	15,463	46–66	W1
113	August 11	White Sox	5–3	**Greinke** (4–7)	Cease (12–5)	**Barlow** (18)	**Kauffman Stadium**	10,009	47–66	W2
114	August 12	Dodgers	3–8	Gonsolin (14–1)	**Staumont** (3–2)	—	**Kauffman Stadium**	24,333	47–67	L1
115	August 13	Dodgers	3–13	Bickford (2–1)	**Keller** (6–13)	—	**Kauffman Stadium**	29,689	47–68	L2
116	August 14	Dodgers	4–0	**Singer** (6–4)	Anderson (13–2)	**Barlow** (19)	**Kauffman Stadium**	18,481	48–68	W1
117	August 15	@ Twins	2–4	Ryan (9–5)	**Bubic** (2–7)	López (21)	Target Field	22,003	48–69	L1
118	August 16	@ Twins	0–9	Gray (7–3)	**Greinke** (4–8)	—	Target Field	23,093	48–70	L2
119	August 17	@ Twins	0–4	Pagán (4–6)	**Lynch** (4–8)	—	Target Field	23,543	48–71	L3
120	August 18	@ Rays	1–7	Patiño (1–1)	**Castillo** (0–1)	—	Tropicana Field	8,169	48–72	L4
121	August 19	@ Rays	3–2 (10)	**Barlow** (5–4)	Beeks (2–3)	—	Tropicana Field	10,049	49–72	W1
122	August 20	@ Rays	2–5	Rasmussen (8–4)	**Bubic** (2–8)	Fairbanks (3)	Tropicana Field	19,800	49–73	L1
123	August 21	@ Rays	2–3	Armstrong (2–1)	**Cuas** (2–2)	Fairbanks (4)	Tropicana Field	12,940	49–74	L2
124	August 22	White Sox	6–4	**Garrett** (3–1)	Kelly (1–3)	**Barlow** (20)	**Kauffman Stadium**	8,471	50–74	W1
125	August 23	Diamondbacks	3–7	Mantiply (2–4)	**Staumont** (3–3)	—	**Kauffman Stadium**	12,427	50–75	L1
126	August 24	Diamondbacks	5–3	**Singer** (7–4)	Ramirez (4–4)	—	**Kauffman Stadium**	10,531	51–75	W1
127	August 26	Padres	5–13	Suárez (4–1)	**Bubic** (2–9)	—	**Kauffman Stadium**	16,479	51–76	L1
128	August 27	Padres	3–4	Darvish (11–7)	**Lynch** (4–9)	Martinez (6)	**Kauffman Stadium**	22,232	51–77	L2
129	August 28	Padres	15–7	**Heasley** (2–7)	Manaea (7–7)	—	**Kauffman Stadium**	12,584	52–77	W1
130	August 30	@ White Sox	9–7	**Cuas** (3–2)	Giolito (10–8)	—	Guaranteed Rate Field	17,130	53–77	W2
131	August 31	@ White Sox	2–4	Lynn (4–5)	**Bubic** (2–10)	Hendriks (29)	Guaranteed Rate Field	17,168	53–78	L1

September: 10–16 (Home: 7–5; Away: 3–11)

#	Date	Opponent	Score	Win	Loss	Save	Stadium	Attendance	Record	Streak
132	September 1	@ White Sox	1–7	Cueto (7–6)	**Mengden** (0–1)	—	Guaranteed Rate Field	15,257	53–79	L2
133	September 2	@ Tigers	4–5	Chafin (1–2)	**Hernández** (0–4)	Soto (24)	Comerica Park	16,067	53–80	L3
134	September 3	@ Tigers	12–2	**Heasley** (3–7)	Pineda (2–7)	—	Comerica Park	15,259	54–80	W1
135	September 4	@ Tigers	3–2	**Coleman** (4–1)	Soto (2–8)	**Barlow** (21)	Comerica Park	15,206	55–80	W2
136	September 5	Guardians	5–6 (10)	Morgan (5–3)	**Hernández** (0–5)	Clase (31)	**Kauffman Stadium**	11,511	55–81	L1
137	September 6	Guardians	1–4	Bieber (9–8)	**Bubic** (2–11)	Karinchak (1)	**Kauffman Stadium**	12,580	55–82	L2
138	September 7	Guardians	2–1	**Barlow** (6−4)	Clase (2−4)	—	**Kauffman Stadium**	13,394	56–82	W1
139	September 9	Tigers	2–10	Wentz (1–1)	**Lynch** (4–10)	—	**Kauffman Stadium**	14,556	56–83	L1
140	September 10	Tigers	4–8 (8)	Manning (2–2)	**Heasley** (3–8)	—	**Kauffman Stadium**	15,929	56–84	L2
141	September 11	Tigers	4–0	**Singer** (8–4)	Alexander (3–10)	—	**Kauffman Stadium**	13,150	57–84	W1
142	September 13	@ Twins	3–6	Ryan (11–8)	**Bubic** (2–12)	—	Target Field	19,005	57–85	L1
143	September 14	@ Twins	0–4	Gray (8–4)	**Greinke** (4–9)	—	Target Field	14,927	57–86	L2
144	September 15	@ Twins	2–3	Megill (4–3)	**Lynch** (4–11)	Durán (7)	Target Field	16,595	57–87	L3
145	September 16	@ Red Sox	1–2	Whitlock (4–2)	**Coleman** (4–2)	Strahm (4)	Fenway Park	33,181	57–88	L4
146	September 17	@ Red Sox	9–0	**Singer** (9–4)	Hill (7–7)	—	Fenway Park	34,925	58–88	W1
147	September 18	@ Red Sox	3–13	Pivetta (10–11)	**Bubic** (2–13)	—	Fenway Park	31,199	58–89	L1
148	September 20	Twins	5–4	**Coleman** (5–2)	Fulmer (5–6)	**Barlow** (22)	**Kauffman Stadium**	14,508	59–89	W1
149	September 21	Twins	5–2	**Misiewicz** (1–1)	Ober (1–3)	**Barlow** (23)	**Kauffman Stadium**	13,952	60–89	W2
150	September 22	Twins	4–1	**Heasley** (4–8)	Winder (4–5)	**Keller** (1)	**Kauffman Stadium**	12,951	61–89	W3
151	September 23	Mariners	5–1	**Singer** (10–4)	Gonzales (10–15)	—	**Kauffman Stadium**	13,615	62–89	W4
152	September 24	Mariners	5–6	Sewald (5–4)	**Keller** (6–14)	Muñoz (4)	**Kauffman Stadium**	25,237	62–90	L1
153	September 25	Mariners	13–12	**Cuas** (4–2)	Brash (3–5)	**Barlow** (24)	**Kauffman Stadium**	18,350	63–90	W1
154	September 27	@ Tigers	3–4 (10)	Lange (6–4)	**Misiewicz** (2–2)	—	Comerica Park	13,334	63–91	L1
155	September 28	@ Tigers	1–2	Norris (1–4)	**Lynch** (4–12)	Soto (29)	Comerica Park	12,610	63–92	L2
156	September 29	@ Tigers	3–10	Rodríguez (5–5)	**Heasley** (4–9)	—	Comerica Park	13,137	63–93	L3
157	September 30	@ Guardians	3–6	Civale (4–6)	**Singer** (10–5)	Clase (40)	Progressive Field	19,753	63–94	L4

October: 2–3 (Home: 0–0; Away: 2–3)

#	Date	Opponent	Score	Win	Loss	Save	Stadium	Attendance	Record	Streak
158	October 1	@ Guardians	7–1	**Bubic** (3–13)	Plesac (3–12)	—	Progressive Field	26,982	64–94	W1
159	October 2	@ Guardians	5–7	Bieber (13–8)	**Castillo** (0–2)	Clase (41)	Progressive Field	20,622	64–95	L1
160	October 3	@ Guardians	5–2 (10)	**Barlow** (7–4)	McCarty (4–3)	**Clarke** (3)	Progressive Field	18,688	65–95	W1
161	October 4	@ Guardians	3–5	Quantrill (15–5)	**Lynch** (4–13)	Clase (42)	Progressive Field	19,455	65–96	L1
162	October 5	@ Guardians	2–9	Civale (5–6)	**Heasley** (4–10)	—	Progressive Field	12,983	65–97	L2

Legend: = Win = Loss = Postponement
Bold = Royals team member

== Statistics ==
=== Batting ===
(Final Stats)
Players in bold are on the active roster.
Note: G = Games played; AB = At bats; R = Runs; H = Hits; 2B = Doubles; 3B = Triples; HR = Home runs; RBI = Runs batted in; SB = Stolen bases; BB = Walks; K = Strikeouts; Avg. = Batting average; OBP = On-base percentage; SLG = Slugging percentage; TB = Total bases

Player	G	AB	R	H	2B	3B	HR	RBI	SB	BB	K	AVG	OBP	SLG	TB
Andrew Benintendi *	93	347	40	111	14	2	3	39	4	39	52	.320	.387	.398	138
Dairon Blanco	5	7	1	2	0	0	0	2	1	0	4	.286	.286	.286	2
Hunter Dozier	128	462	51	109	26	4	12	41	4	34	125	.236	.292	.387	179
Nate Eaton	44	106	16	28	4	3	1	12	11	10	30	.264	.331	.387	41
Cam Gallagher	18	42	1	9	5	0	0	5	0	3	13	.214	.267	.333	14
Brewer Hicklen	6	4	1	0	0	0	0	0	0	0	4	.000	.000	.000	0
Kyle Isbel	106	256	32	54	10	4	5	28	9	16	75	.211	.264	.340	87
Nicky Lopez	141	436	51	99	12	4	0	20	13	29	63	.227	.281	.273	119
Michael Massey	52	173	16	42	9	1	4	17	3	9	46	.243	.307	.376	65
**MJ Melendez**	129	460	57	100	21	3	18	62	2	66	131	.217	.313	.393	181
Whit Merrifield *	95	383	51	92	23	1	6	42	15	30	61	.240	.290	.352	135
Adalberto Mondesi	15	50	3	7	0	0	0	3	5	4	20	.140	.204	.140	7
Ryan O'Hearn	67	134	14	32	6	1	1	16	0	8	35	.239	.290	.321	43
Edward Olivares	53	161	24	46	8	0	4	15	2	10	36	.286	.333	.410	66
Vinnie Pasquantino	72	258	25	76	10	0	10	26	1	35	34	.295	.383	.450	116
Salvador Pérez	114	445	48	113	23	1	23	76	0	18	109	.254	.292	.465	207
Nick Pratto	49	158	18	29	9	1	7	20	0	19	66	.184	.271	.386	61
Emmanuel Rivera *	63	198	24	47	8	3	6	22	0	11	46	.237	.284	.399	79
Sebastian Rivero	17	26	2	4	0	0	0	1	0	2	10	.154	.214	.154	4
Carlos Santana *	52	176	17	38	10	0	4	21	0	36	28	.216	.349	.341	60
Michael A. Taylor	124	414	49	105	10	3	9	43	4	35	109	.254	.313	.357	148
Drew Waters	32	96	14	23	6	1	5	18	0	12	40	.240	.324	.479	46
**Bobby Witt Jr.**	150	591	82	150	31	6	20	80	30	30	135	.254	.294	.428	253
**TEAM TOTALS**	162	5437	640	1327	247	38	138	613	104	460	1287	.244	.306	.380	2064

=== Pitching ===
(Final Stats)
Players in bold are on the active roster.
Note: W = Wins; L = Losses; ERA = Earned run average; WHIP = Walks plus hits per inning pitched; G = Games pitched; GS = Games started; SV = Saves; IP = Innings pitched; H = Hits allowed; R = Runs allowed; ER = Earned runs allowed; BB = Walks allowed; K = Strikeouts

Player	W	L	ERA	WHIP	G	GS	SV	IP	H	R	ER	BB	K
Albert Abreu *	0	0	4.15	2.31	4	0	0	4.1	6	2	2	4	3
Scott Barlow	7	4	2.18	1.00	69	0	24	74.1	52	19	18	22	77
Ronald Bolaños	0	0	4.42	1.75	8	0	0	18.1	20	9	9	12	12
Jake Brentz	0	3	23.63	3.94	8	0	0	5.1	11	15	14	10	9
Kris Bubic	3	13	5.58	1.70	28	27	0	129.0	156	80	80	63	110
Taylor Clarke	3	1	4.04	1.18	47	0	3	49.0	50	25	22	8	48
Dylan Coleman	5	2	2.78	1.24	68	0	0	68.0	47	25	21	37	71
José Cuas	4	2	3.58	1.67	47	0	1	37.2	39	15	15	24	34
Amir Garrett	3	1	4.96	1.32	60	0	0	45.1	28	25	25	32	49
Zack Greinke	4	9	3.68	1.34	26	26	0	137.0	157	58	56	27	73
Foster Griffin *	0	0	12.46	2.31	5	0	0	4.1	6	7	6	4	2
Jonathan Heasley	4	10	5.28	1.49	21	21	0	104.0	108	61	61	47	70
Carlos Hernández	0	5	7.39	1.84	27	7	0	56.0	72	47	46	31	35
Brad Keller	6	14	5.09	1.50	35	22	1	139.2	153	81	79	57	102
Jackson Kowar	0	0	9.77	2.43	7	0	0	15.2	27	17	17	11	17
Daniel Lynch	4	13	5.13	1.57	27	27	0	131.2	155	76	75	52	122
Joel Payamps *	2	3	3.16	1.45	29	0	0	42.2	46	17	15	16	33
Matt Peacock *	0	0	4.91	1.50	7	0	0	7.1	9	4	4	2	4
Brady Singer	10	5	3.23	1.14	27	24	0	153.1	140	56	55	35	150
Collin Snider	4	2	6.55	1.60	42	0	0	34.1	40	25	25	15	22
Gabe Speier	0	1	2.33	1.09	17	1	0	19.1	16	5	5	5	14
Josh Staumont	3	3	6.45	1.75	42	0	3	37.2	37	27	27	29	43
Arodys Vizcaíno	0	0	6.35	1.94	7	0	0	5.2	4	4	4	7	3
**TEAM TOTALS**	65	97	4.70	1.47	162	162	33	1416.0	1493	758	740	589	1191

== Farm system ==
Level	Team	League	Manager
Triple-A	Omaha Storm Chasers	International League	Scott Thorman
Double-A	Northwest Arkansas Naturals	Texas League	Chris Widger
High-A	Quad Cities River Bandits	Midwest League	Brooks Conrad
Single-A	Columbia Fireflies	Carolina League	Tony Peña Jr.
Rookie	ACL Royals Blue	Arizona Complex League	Omar Ramirez
Rookie	DSL Royals Glass	Dominican Summer League	Ramon Martinez
Rookie	DSL Royals Stewart	Dominican Summer League	Sergio De Luna
