= Tyler Cropley =

American baseball player (born 1995)

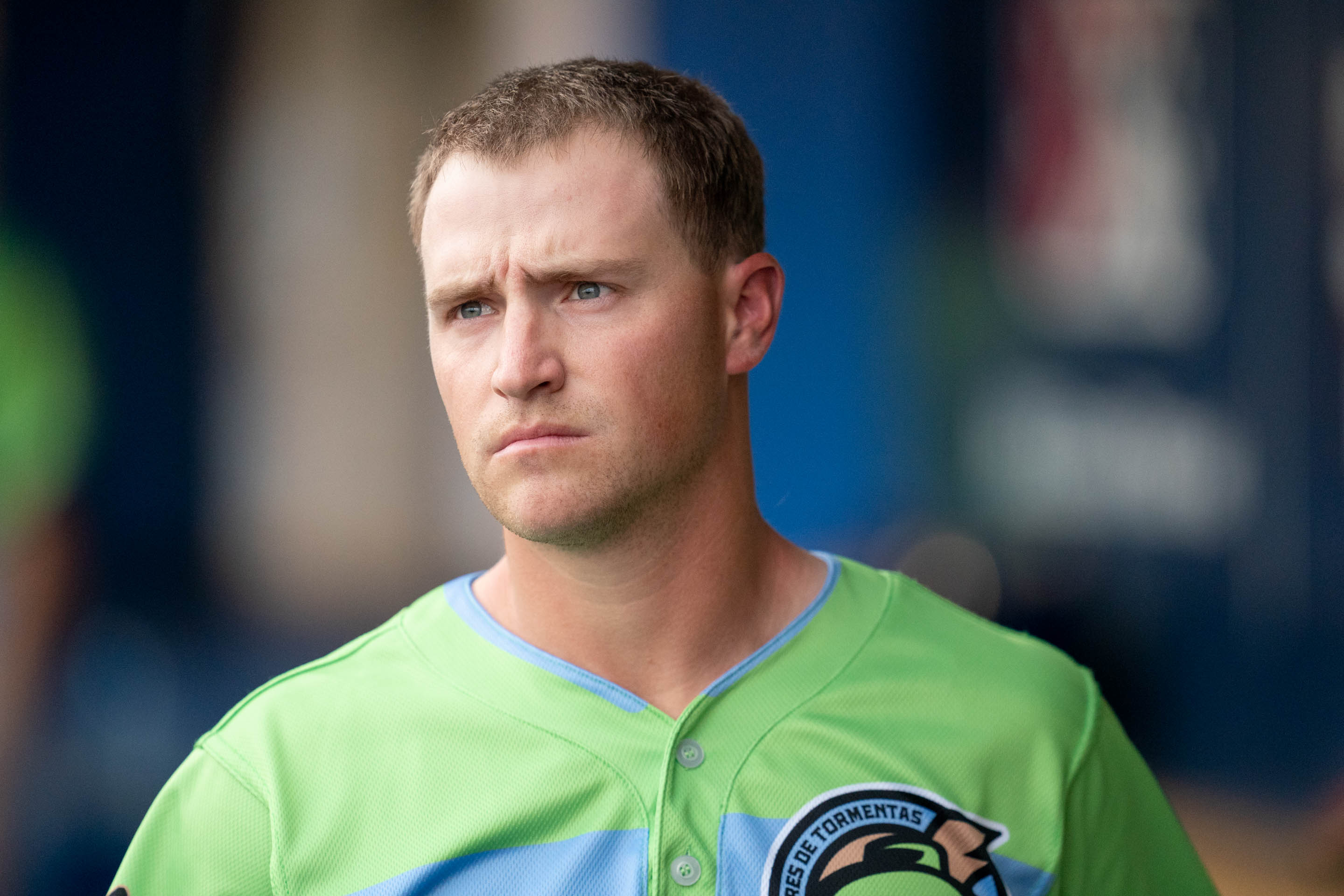
- Cropley with the Omaha Storm Chasers in 2023

Iowa Hawkeyes
- Catcher
- Born: December 10, 1995 (age 30); Sioux City, Iowa, U.S.
- Batted: Right Threw: Right

MLB debut
- September 19, 2023, for the Kansas City Royals

Last MLB appearance
- September 23, 2023, for the Kansas City Royals

MLB statistics
- Batting average: .167
- Home runs: 0
- Runs batted in: 1
- Stats at Baseball Reference

Teams
- Kansas City Royals (2023)

Tyler Cropley (born December 10, 1995) is an American former professional baseball catcher. He played in Major League Baseball (MLB) for the Kansas City Royals during the 2023 season.

== Playing career ==
=== Amateur ===
Cropley graduated from Bishop Heelan Catholic High School in Sioux City, Iowa, in 2014. He played college baseball at Iowa Western Community College and the University of Iowa. In 2018, while playing for the Iowa Hawkeyes, Collegiate Baseball named Cropley to their All-American second team.

=== Washington Nationals ===
The Washington Nationals selected Cropley in the eighth round, with the 251st selection, of the 2018 Major League Baseball draft. He spent his first professional season split between the rookie–level Gulf Coast League Nationals and Low–A Auburn Doubledays, hitting .310 across 14 games. He spent the 2019 season with the Single–A Hagerstown Suns, hitting .187/.294/.276 with 2 home runs and 8 RBI across 41 games. Cropley did not play in a game in 2020 due to the cancellation of the minor league season because of the COVID-19 pandemic. On May 29, 2020, Cropley was released by the Nationals.

=== Kansas City Royals ===
On October 8, 2020, Cropley signed a minor league contract with the Kansas City Royals organization. He spent the 2021 season with the Double–A Northwest Arkansas Naturals, batting .194/.325/.313 with 2 home runs and 6 RBI. Cropley returned to Northwest Arkansas in 2022, also playing in 3 games for the Single–A Columbia Fireflies and 2 games for the rookie–level Arizona Complex League Royals. In 31 games for the Naturals, he hit .163/.262/.283 with 2 home runs and 7 RBI.

Cropley returned to Northwest Arkansas for a third season in 2023. In 43 games, he hit .235/.329/.359 with career–highs in home runs (4) and RBI (17). On September 9, 2023, Cropley was selected to the 40-man roster and promoted to the major leagues for the first time. The promotion was made after backup catcher Freddy Fermín was placed on the injured list with a finger fracture. Cropley did not make an appearance for the Royals before he was designated for assignment on September 11. He cleared waivers and was sent outright to the Triple–A Omaha Storm Chasers on September 13. On September 18, Cropley was selected back to the major league roster after Salvador Pérez suffered a concussion. In two games for the Royals, he went 1–for–6 (.167) with one RBI. Following the season on October 24, Cropley was removed from the 40–man roster and sent outright to Triple–A Omaha. He was released by the Royals organization on March 27, 2024.

== Coaching career ==
Cropley joined the Iowa Hawkeyes baseball staff on August 27, 2024, as a student assistant coach.
