= José Cuas =

Dominican-American baseball player (born 1994)

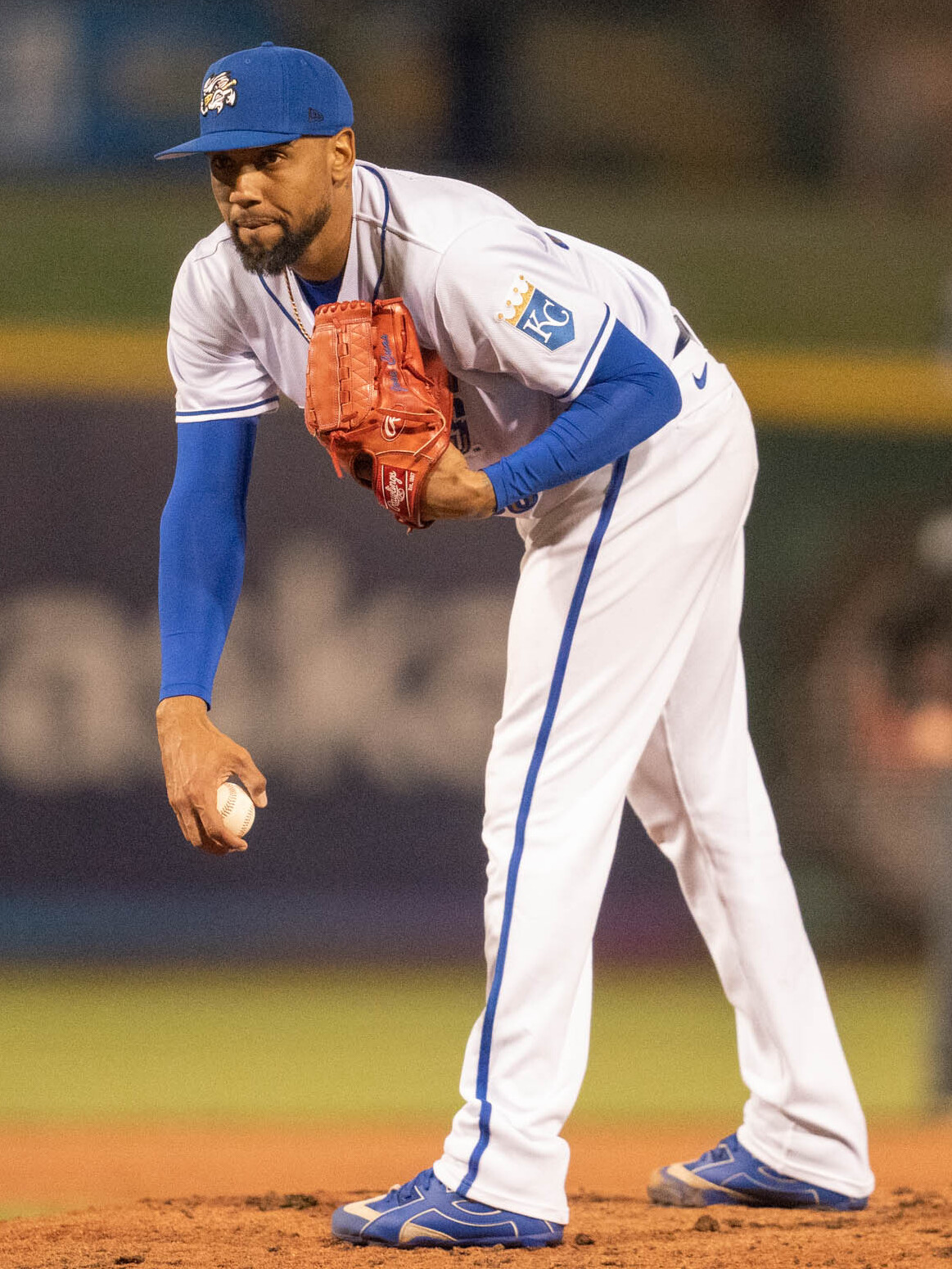
- Cuas with the Omaha Storm Chasers in 2026

Kansas City Royals – No. 74
- Pitcher
- Born: June 28, 1994 (age 32); Santo Domingo, Dominican Republic
- Bats: Right Throws: Right

MLB debut
- May 31, 2022, for the Kansas City Royals

MLB statistics (through 2026 season)
- Win–loss record: 7–5
- Earned run average: 4.04
- Strikeouts: 147
- Stats at Baseball Reference

Teams
- Kansas City Royals (2022–2023); Chicago Cubs (2023–2024); Toronto Blue Jays (2024); Kansas City Royals (2026–present)

José Luis Cuas (kwas; born June 28, 1994) is a Dominican-American professional baseball pitcher for the Kansas City Royals of Major League Baseball (MLB). He has previously played in MLB for the Chicago Cubs and Toronto Blue Jays.

== Amateur career ==
Cuas attended Grand Street Campus High School in Brooklyn, New York. Cuas was drafted by the Toronto Blue Jays in the 40th round of the 2012 MLB draft but did not sign. He attended the University of Maryland where he played college baseball for the Terrapins. In 2014, he played collegiate summer baseball with the Wareham Gatemen of the Cape Cod Baseball League. Cuas was a three-year starter as an infielder at Maryland, and enjoyed his best season as a junior in 2015, hitting .242/.329/.442/.771 with 11 home runs and 53 RBI. He was drafted by the Milwaukee Brewers in the 11th round of the 2015 MLB draft and signed with them.

== Professional career ==
=== Milwaukee Brewers ===
Cuas spent his debut season of 2015 with the rookie–level Helena Brewers, hitting .260/.319/.430/. with seven home runs and 40 RBI. He spent the 2016 season with the High–A Brevard County Manatees, playing in 120 games and hitting .170/.263/.240 with four home runs and 27 RBI. Cuas split the 2017 season between the Single–A Wisconsin Timber Rattlers and the High–A Carolina Mudcats, hitting a cumulative .187/.277/.321 with five home runs and 28 RBI.

Cuas was converted to a pitcher prior to the 2018 season. He opened the season with Wisconsin, going 2–0 with an 8.38 ERA over 19 1/3 innings before being released on July 10.

=== Long Island Ducks ===
Cuas signed with the Long Island Ducks of the Atlantic League of Professional Baseball and finished the 2018 season with them, going 2–1 with a 2.38 ERA and 17 strikeouts over 22 2/3 innings. Cuas opened the 2019 season back with Long Island.

It was with the Ducks that Cuas began pitching sidearm. Cuas had been throwing sidearm while warming up until, on the advice of Ducks teammate Francisco Rodríguez, he began to work on throwing sidearm full-time.

=== Arizona Diamondbacks ===
On May 25, 2019, Cuas was signed to a minor league contract by the Arizona Diamondbacks. Between the Low-A Hillsboro Hops, the Single-A Kane County Cougars, and the High-A Visalia Rawhide, Cuas posted a combined 6–3 record with a 1.60 ERA and 25 strikeouts over 45 innings. Cuas was released by Arizona on May 22, 2020, and did not play in 2020 due to the cancellation of the Minor League Baseball season because of the COVID-19 pandemic. Cuas took a job as a FedEx delivery driver during the day and trained with his younger brother in a park in Brooklyn at night.

=== Long Island Ducks (second stint) ===
On April 16, 2021, Cuas signed with the Long Island Ducks of the Atlantic League of Professional Baseball. He pitched in five games for the Ducks and threw 11 scoreless innings with 13 strikeouts.

=== Kansas City Royals ===
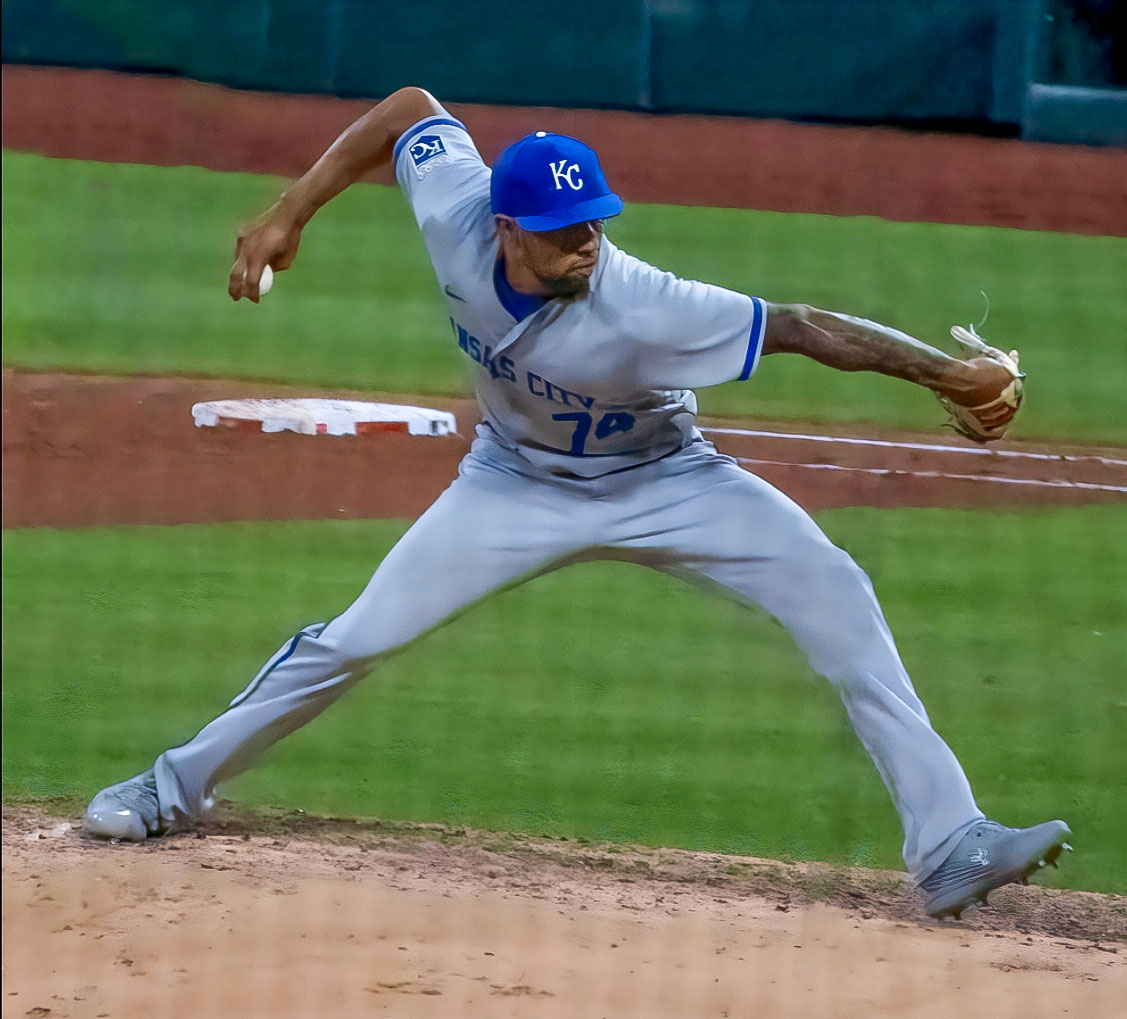
Cuas pitching in 2023

On June 17, 2021, Cuas signed a minor league contract with the Kansas City Royals organization.

Cuas split his affiliated time in 2021 between the rookie-level Arizona Complex League Royals, the Double-A Northwest Arkansas Naturals, and the Triple-A Omaha Storm Chasers, going a combined 5–1 with a 1.51 ERA and 44 strikeouts over 41 2/3 innings. He received a non-roster invitation to MLB spring training in 2022.

On May 30, Kansas City selected Cuas' contract and promoted him to the Major Leagues for the first time. He made his Major League debut the following day against the Cleveland Guardians. He struck out the first batter he faced, Oscar Mercado, and retired the next two hitters in order for a perfect inning of relief. On August 9, Cuas recorded his first career save after pitching a scoreless 2/3 of an inning against the Chicago White Sox.

Cuas made the Royals' Opening Day roster in 2023 as part of the club's bullpen.

=== Chicago Cubs ===
On July 31, 2023, the Royals traded Cuas to the Chicago Cubs in exchange for Nelson Velázquez. In 27 appearances for the Cubs, he compiled a 3.04 ERA with 19 strikeouts across 23 2/3 innings pitched.

Cuas made nine appearances for Chicago in 2024, struggling to a 7.43 ERA with 14 strikeouts across 13 1/3 innings pitched. On June 16, 2024, Cuas was designated for assignment by the Cubs.

=== Toronto Blue Jays ===
On June 23, 2024, Cuas was claimed off waivers by the Toronto Blue Jays. In 4 games for Toronto, he struggled to a 9.00 ERA with three strikeouts over three innings. Cuas was designated for assignment by the Blue Jays on September 5.

=== Philadelphia Phillies ===
On September 7, 2024, Cuas was claimed off waivers by the Philadelphia Phillies. In 4 games for the Triple-A Lehigh Valley IronPigs, he recorded a 4.91 ERA with 5 strikeouts across 3 2/3 innings pitched. Cuas was designated for assignment following the signing of Joe Ross on December 23. He cleared waivers and was sent outright to Triple-A Lehigh Valley on January 10, 2025. In seven appearances for the IronPigs, Cuas struggled to a 13.50 ERA with four strikeouts across 5 1/3 innings pitched. He was released by the Phillies organization on May 1.

=== Atlanta Braves ===
On May 25, 2025, Cuas signed a minor league contract with the Atlanta Braves. In 18 appearances for the Double-A Columbus Clingstones, he posted a 2–1 record and 3.22 ERA with 23 strikeouts and one save across 22 1/3 innings pitched. Cuas was released by the Braves organization on August 4.

=== Kansas City Royals (second stint) ===
On December 12, 2025, Cuas signed a minor league contract with the Kansas City Royals. He began the regular season with the Triple–A Omaha Storm Chasers, where he recorded a 3.31 ERA across 29 appearances. On July 1, 2026, the Royals selected Cuas' contract, adding him to their active roster.

== Personal life ==
At the time of his Major League debut, Cuas had a four-year-old son and one-year-old daughter with his longtime girlfriend.

His younger brother, Alex, played college baseball at Towson.

== See also ==
- List of Major League Baseball players from the Dominican Republic
