= Parker Morin =

American baseball player and bullpen catcher (born 1991)

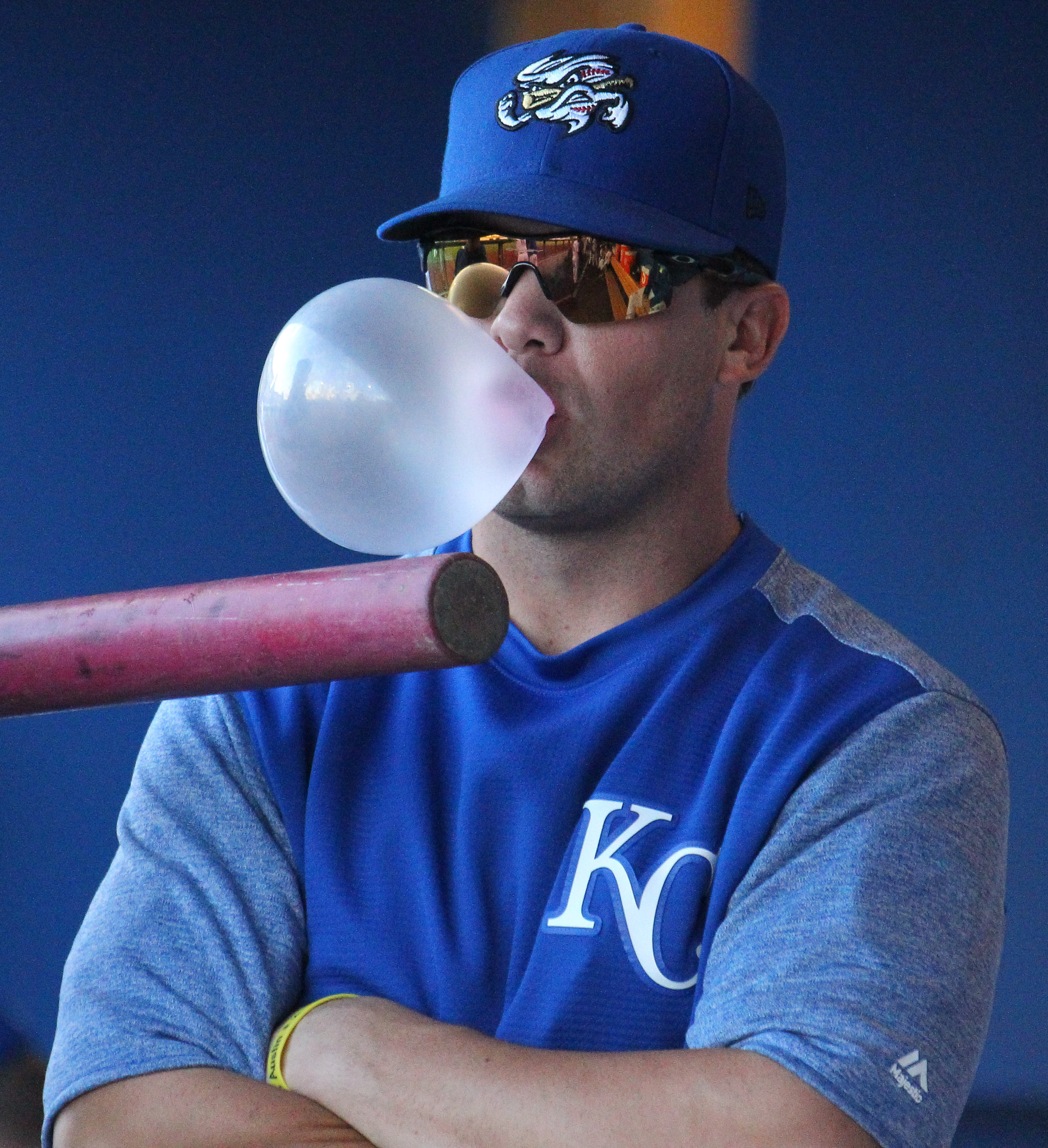
- Morin with the Omaha Storm Chasers in 2018

Kansas City Royals – No. 70
- Catcher / Bullpen catcher
- Born: July 2, 1991 (age 34); Richmond, Virginia, U.S.
- Bats: Left Throws: Right
Medals
Men's baseball
Representing United States
WBSC Premier12
Silver medal – second place	2015 Tokyo	Team

Parker M. Morin (born July 2, 1991) is an American former professional baseball catcher and current bullpen catcher for the Kansas City Royals of Major League Baseball.

== Playing career ==
=== Amateur ===
Morin grew up in the Dallas–Fort Worth metroplex, before his family moved to Utah when he was in the seventh grade. He graduated from Park City High School in Park City, Utah. He enrolled at the College of Southern Idaho, where he played college baseball for the Southern Idaho Golden Eagles. After two seasons, Morin transferred to the University of Utah to continue his college baseball career with the Utah Utes.

=== Kansas City Royals ===
The Kansas City Royals selected Morin in the 14th round, with the 433rd overall selection, of the 2012 Major League Baseball draft. He made his professional debut with the rookie–level Idaho Falls Chukars, hitting .267 across 55 games. In 2013, Morin played for the High–A Wilmington Blue Rocks, playing in 88 games and hitting .226/.294/.293 with one home run and 30 RBI.

Morin spent the majority of the 2014 season with the Double–A Northwest Arkansas Naturals, also playing in seven games for Idaho Falls and one game for the Triple–A Omaha Storm Chasers. In 55 games for Northwest Arkansas, he hit .206/.261/.291 with 2 home runs and 16 RBI. In 2015, Morin played in 59 games split between Wilmington and Northwest Arkansas, hitting .296/.335/.468, tying a career–high in home runs (4), and setting a career–high in RBI (31). He played for the United States national baseball team in the 2015 WBSC Premier12. For the 2016 season, Morin appeared in 76 games for Triple–A Omaha, slashing .184/.255/.239 with one home run and 22 RBI.

In 2017, Morin split time between Omaha, Northwest Arkansas, and the rookie–level Arizona League Royals. In 48 combined games, he accumulated a .190/.226/.281 batting line with 2 home runs and 20 RBI. Morin returned to Triple–A Omaha in 2018, playing in 53 games and hitting .265/.321/.351 with one home run and 9 RBI. He elected free agency following the season on November 2, 2018.

=== Lancaster Barnstormers ===
On January 15, 2019, Morin signed a minor league contract with the Cincinnati Reds organization. However, Morin was released prior to the regular season on March 23.

On April 26, 2019, Morin signed with the Lancaster Barnstormers of the Atlantic League of Professional Baseball. He played in 70 games for the Barnstormers, hitting .251/.295/.396 with 5 home runs and 22 RBI.

=== Kansas City Royals (second stint) ===
On January 17, 2020, Morin signed a minor league contract with the Kansas City Royals organization. He did not play in a game in 2020 due to the cancellation of the minor league season because of the COVID-19 pandemic. Morin was released by Kansas City on June 27, after not being included in the team's 60–man player pool.

== Coaching career ==
On November 12, 2021, the Kansas City Royals hired Morin as their pitching strategist/bullpen catcher for the 2022 season.
