= Daniel Lynch IV =

American baseball player (born 1996)

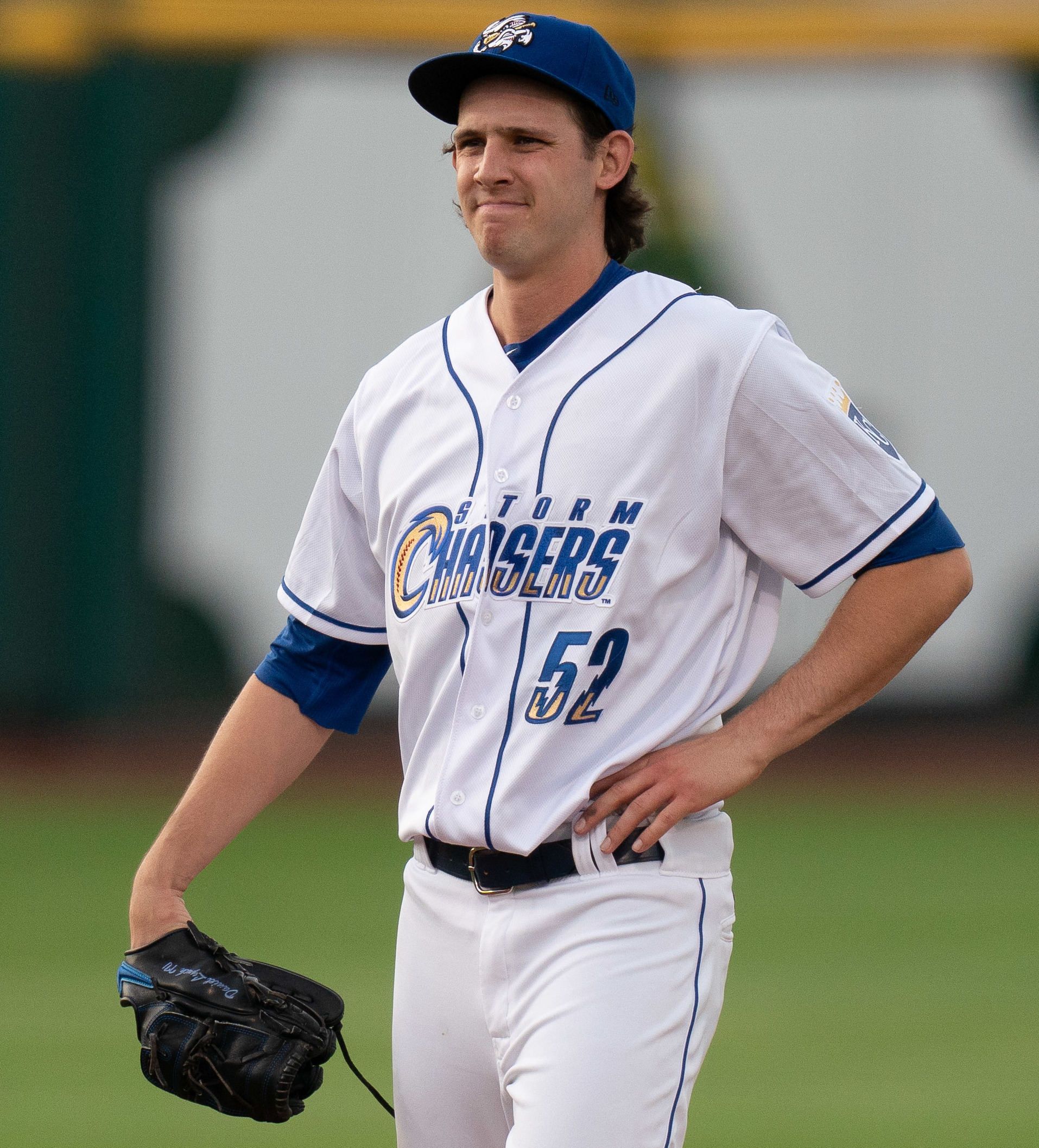
- Lynch IV with the Omaha Storm Chasers in 2021

Kansas City Royals – No. 41
- Pitcher
- Born: November 17, 1996 (age 29); Richmond, Virginia, U.S.
- Bats: Left Throws: Left

MLB debut
- May 3, 2021, for the Kansas City Royals

MLB statistics (through 2026 season)
- Win–loss record: 25–31
- Earned run average: 4.47
- Strikeouts: 351
- Stats at Baseball Reference

Teams
- Kansas City Royals (2021–present)

Daniel Aloysius Lynch IV (born November 17, 1996) is an American professional baseball pitcher for the Kansas City Royals of Major League Baseball (MLB). He made his MLB debut in 2021.

== Amateur career ==
Lynch played baseball at Douglas S. Freeman High School in Henrico, Virginia. As a junior, he compiled a 0.97 ERA. After high school, he enrolled at the University of Virginia where he played for the Virginia Cavaliers baseball team. During his freshman year at Virginia, he appeared in 13 games with nine starts and went 1–3 with a 5.49 earned run average (ERA) and 37 strikeouts. As a sophomore, he made 14 starts, going 7–5 with a 5.00 ERA with 45 strikeouts. The following summer in 2017, he pitched for the Orleans Firebirds of the Cape Cod League, where he made six starts and posted a 4–0 record with a 2.04 ERA and 25 strikeouts and was named a league all-star. During his junior season, Lynch went 4–4 over the course of 13 starts with a 3.96 ERA and 105 strikeouts.

== Professional career ==
=== Minor leagues ===
Lynch was selected by the Kansas City Royals with the 34th overall pick in the 2018 Major League Baseball draft. He signed with the Royals on June 10, 2018, for $1.7 million. He made his professional debut with the Burlington Royals of the Rookie-level Appalachian League before being promoted to the Lexington Legends of the Single–A South Atlantic League. In 12 starts between the two clubs, he went 5–1 with a 1.58 ERA and a 1.01 WHIP.

Lynch spent 2019 with the Wilmington Blue Rocks of the High–A Carolina League and was named a Carolina League All-Star midway through the season. Over 15 starts, he went 5–2 with a 3.10 ERA. He was selected to play in the Arizona Fall League for the Surprise Saguaros following the season, earning All-Star honors. He did not play any minor league games in 2020 due to the cancellation of the minor league season because of the COVID-19 pandemic.

=== Major leagues ===
On May 2, 2021, the Royals announced that Lynch would be promoted for the next day's game and be the starting pitcher against the Cleveland Indians. Lynch was officially added to the 40-man roster on May 3, and given the number 52. He finished his rookie campaign making 15 starts for the Royals, posting a 4–6 record and 5.19 ERA with 55 strikeouts across 68.0 innings of work. In 2022, Lynch made 27 starts for Kansas City, registering a 4–13 record and 5.13 ERA with 122 strikeouts in 131 2/3 innings pitched.

After missing the first two months of the 2023 season with a left shoulder strain, Lynch was placed back on the injured list with the same ailment on July 19, 2023. In his time on the active roster in between IL stint, he had recorded a 4.64 ERA with 34 strikeouts in 52 1/3 innings across 9 starts. Lynch was transferred to the 60–day injured list on September 6.

Optioned to the Triple–A Omaha Storm Chasers to begin the 2024 season, Lynch was quickly recalled to join the starting rotation in May. Lynch settled into a left-handed relief role becoming a staple of the Royals bullpen with occasional starts as an "opener" for bullpen games. In 2025, Lynch set career highs in WAR (1.3), ERA (3.06), ERA+ (135) and appearances (57).

== Personal life ==
On July 18, 2023, Lynch added the suffix IV to his name, honoring his father and grandfather. In doing so, he became the first player in MLB history to play with the suffix IV on his jersey.
