= Jonathan Heasley =

American baseball player (born 1997)

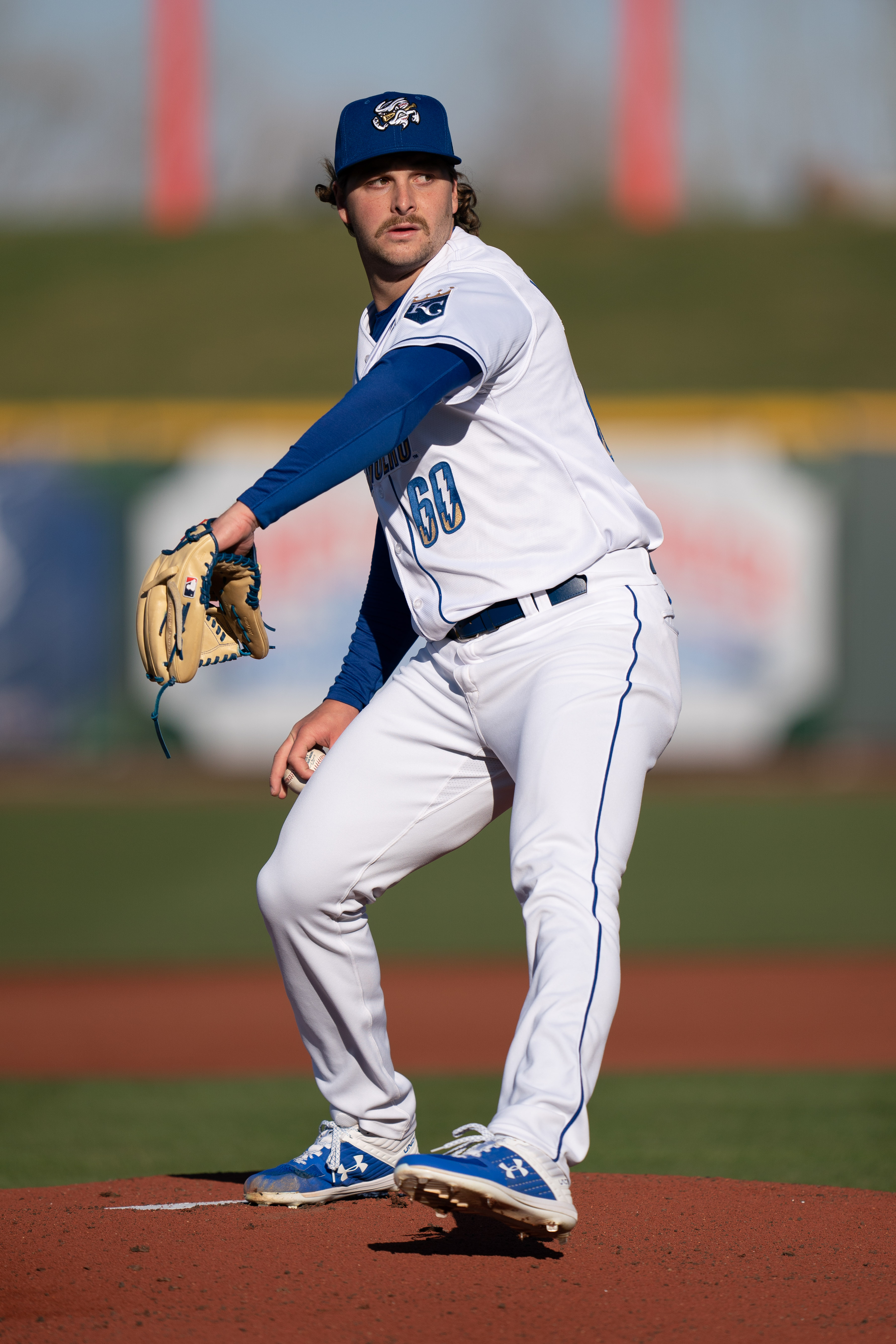
- Heasley with the Omaha Storm Chasers in 2022

Free agent
- Pitcher
- Born: January 27, 1997 (age 29); Charlotte, North Carolina, U.S.
- Bats: Right Throws: Right

MLB debut
- September 17, 2021, for the Kansas City Royals

MLB statistics (through 2026 season)
- Win–loss record: 5–12
- Earned run average: 6.04
- Strikeouts: 91
- Stats at Baseball Reference

Teams
- Kansas City Royals (2021–2023); Baltimore Orioles (2024); Tampa Bay Rays (2026)

Jonathan Paul Heasley (born January 27, 1997) is an American professional baseball pitcher who is a free agent. He has previously played in Major League Baseball (MLB) for the Kansas City Royals, Baltimore Orioles, and Tampa Bay Rays.

== Career ==
=== Amateur career ===
Heasley attended Prestonwood Christian Academy in Plano, Texas, and Oklahoma State University–Stillwater. He played college baseball for the Oklahoma State Cowboys.

=== Kansas City Royals ===
The Kansas City Royals selected Heasley in the 13th round, with the 392nd overall selection, of the 2018 Major League Baseball draft. Heasley made his professional debut with the rookie–level Idaho Falls Chukars, posting a 5.15 ERA in 12 games. He spent the 2019 season with the Single–A Lexington Legends, making 25 appearances (20 starts) and logging an 8–5 record and 3.12 ERA with 120 strikeouts across 112 2/3 innings pitched.

Heasley did not play in a game in 2020 due to the cancellation of the minor league season because of the COVID-19 pandemic. He returned to action in 2021 with the Double–A Northwest Arkansas Naturals. In 22 contests (21 starts), Heasley recorded a 3.33 ERA with 120 strikeouts in 105 1/3 innings of work.

On September 17, 2021, Heasley was selected to the 40-man roster and promoted to the major leagues for the first time. He made 3 starts in his debut campaign, posting a 4.91 ERA with 6 punch outs in 14 2/3 innings. Heasley worked out of the Royals' rotation in 2022, making 21 starts and registering a 4–10 record and 5.28 ERA with 70 strikeouts across 104.0 innings of work.

In 2023, the Royals shifted Heasley to a bullpen role. In 12 games for the team, he struggled to a 7.20 ERA with 9 strikeouts across 15.0 innings of work.

=== Baltimore Orioles ===
On December 18, 2023, the Royals traded Heasley to the Baltimore Orioles in exchange for Cesar Espinal. He was optioned to the Triple–A Norfolk Tides to begin the 2024 season. In 4 appearances for Baltimore, Heasley struggled to a 16.88 ERA with 4 strikeouts across 5 1/3 innings pitched. He was designated for assignment by the Orioles on July 24, 2024. Heasley was released by the organization the next day.

=== Kansas City Royals (second stint) ===
On January 14, 2025, Heasley signed a minor league contract with the Chicago White Sox. He was released by the White Sox organization on March 31.

On August 5, 2025, Heasley signed a minor league contract with the Kansas City Royals organization. He made 12 appearances split between the Triple-A Omaha Storm Chasers and Double-A Northwest Arkansas Naturals, accumulating a 1-0 record and 6.48 ERA with 11 strikeouts across 16 2/3 innings pitched. On March 28, 2026, Heasley was released by the Royals organization.

=== Tampa Bay Rays ===
On April 11, 2026, Heasley signed a minor league contract with the Tampa Bay Rays. He made seven appearances (including four starts) for the Triple-A Durham Bulls, compiling a 3-2 record and 3.90 ERA with 18 strikeouts across 27 2/3 innings pitched. On May 27, the Rays selected Heasley's contract, adding him to their active roster. He made one appearance for the team, allowing five runs on eight hits with two strikeouts across four innings pitched against the Baltimore Orioles. On May 29, Heasley was designated for assignment by the Rays. He cleared waivers and was sent outright to Durham the following day. However, on June 2, Heasley's outright was rescinded and he was placed on the injured list due to a stress reaction in his right elbow. He was transferred to the 60-day injured list on June 8. On November 2, Heasley was removed from the 40–man roster and elected free agency.
