= Dylan Coleman =

American baseball player (born 1996)

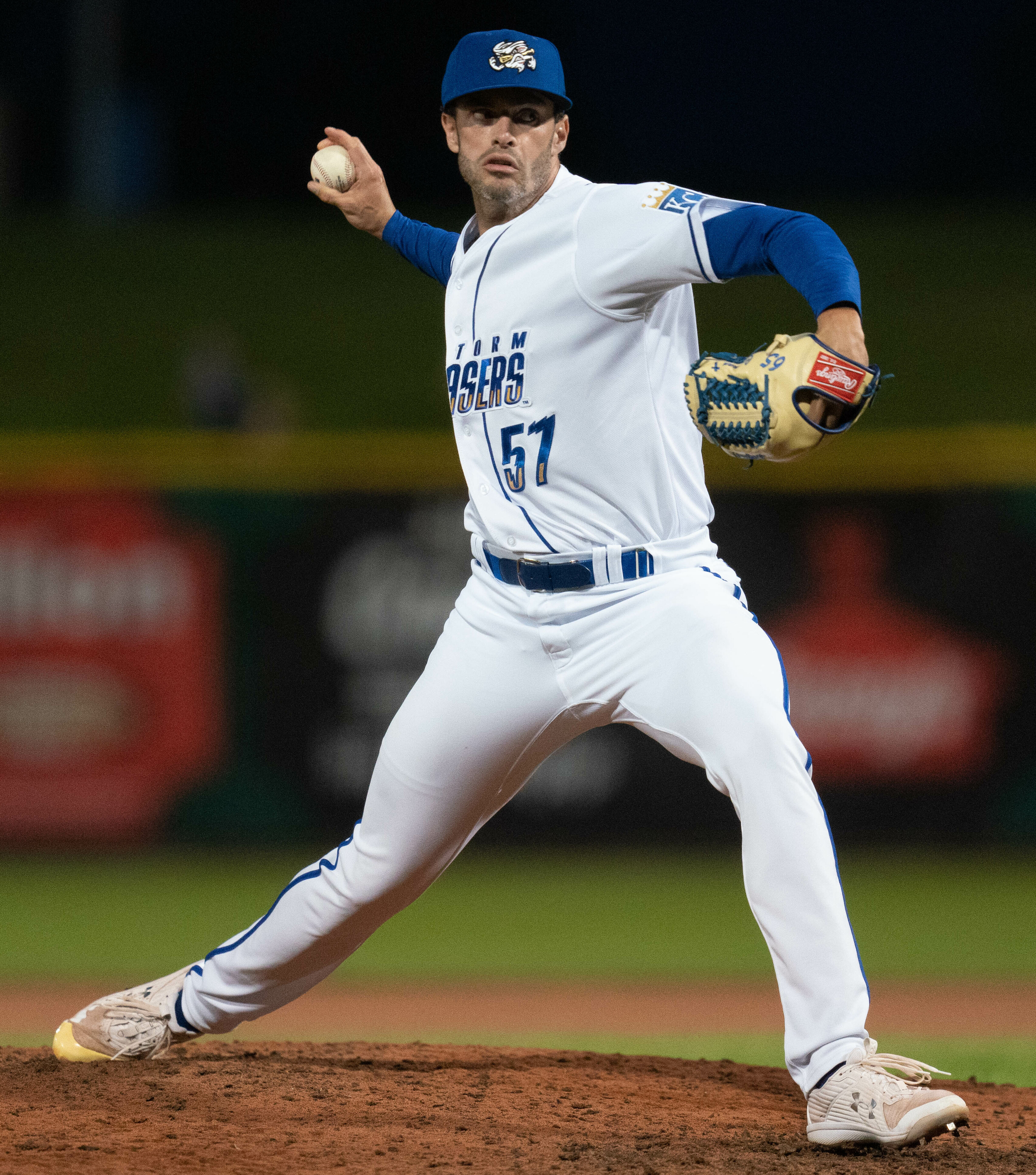
- Coleman with the Omaha Storm Chasers in 2023

Free agent
- Pitcher
- Born: September 16, 1996 (age 29); Potosi, Missouri, U.S.
- Bats: Right Throws: Right

MLB debut
- September 21, 2021, for the Kansas City Royals

MLB statistics (through 2024 season)
- Win–loss record: 5–4
- Earned run average: 3.84
- Strikeouts: 100
- Stats at Baseball Reference

Teams
- Kansas City Royals (2021–2023); Houston Astros (2024)

Dylan David Coleman (born September 16, 1996) is an American professional baseball pitcher who is a free agent. He has previously played in Major League Baseball (MLB) for the Kansas City Royals and Houston Astros.

== Amateur career ==
Coleman attended Potosi High School in Potosi, Missouri. Undrafted out of high school in 2015, he attended Missouri State University to play college baseball for the Bears. He played for the Bourne Braves of the Cape Cod League in 2017. Coleman produced his best collegiate season as a junior in 2018, going 10–2 with a 3.77 ERA and 129 strikeouts over 102 2/3 innings. Coleman was drafted by the San Diego Padres in the fourth round of the 2018 Major League Baseball draft.

== Professional career ==
=== San Diego Padres ===
Coleman split his professional debut season of 2018 between the Tri-City Dust Devils and the Fort Wayne TinCaps, going 1–2 with a 3.18 ERA and 29 strikeouts over 22 2/3 innings. Coleman split the 2019 season between the Arizona League Padres, Fort Wayne, and the Lake Elsinore Storm, going a combined 4–3 with a 3.18 ERA and 39 strikeouts over 34 innings. Coleman did not play in a game in 2020 due to the cancellation of the minor league season because of the COVID-19 pandemic.

=== Kansas City Royals ===
On November 5, 2020, Coleman was traded to the Kansas City Royals as a player to be named later from an earlier trade that sent Trevor Rosenthal to San Diego, and Edward Olivares to Kansas City. Coleman split the 2021 minor league season between the Northwest Arkansas Naturals and the Omaha Storm Chasers, going a combined 5–1 with a 3.28 ERA and 93 strikeouts over 57 2/3 innings.

On September 21, 2021, Kansas City selected Coleman's contract to the active roster, and he made his MLB debut that night versus the Cleveland Indians. He made five appearances for Kansas City in his debut campaign, recording a 1.42 ERA.

Coleman made 68 appearances out of the bullpen for Kansas City in 2022. Across 68.0 innings of work, he registered a 5–2 record and 2.78 ERA with 71 strikeouts. In 2023, Coleman made 23 appearances for the Royals, struggling immensely to an 8.84 ERA, with 21 strikeouts across 18 1/3 innings of work.

=== Houston Astros ===
On December 6, 2023, the Royals traded Coleman to the Houston Astros in exchange for Carlos Mateo. He was optioned to the Triple–A Sugar Land Space Cowboys to begin the 2024 season. Coleman made his Astros debut on April 3, tossing a scoreless inning against the Toronto Blue Jays. He was designated for assignment by Houston on August 6. Coleman was released by the Astros on August 9.

=== Baltimore Orioles ===
On February 8, 2025, Coleman signed a minor league contract with the Baltimore Orioles. In 11 appearances split between the Double-A Chesapeake Baysox and Triple-A Norfolk Tides, he accumulated a 2-0 record and 4.91 ERA with 14 strikeouts across 14 2/3 innings pitched. Coleman was released by the Orioles on May 16.

=== New York Yankees ===
On January 17, 2026, Coleman signed a minor league contract with the New York Yankees. He made 19 appearances for the Triple–A Scranton/Wilkes-Barre Railriders, compiling a 1–1 record and 2.57 ERA with 26 strikeouts and two saves over 21 innings of relief. Coleman was released by the Yankees on July 6.
