= Scott Barlow (baseball) =

American baseball player (born 1992)

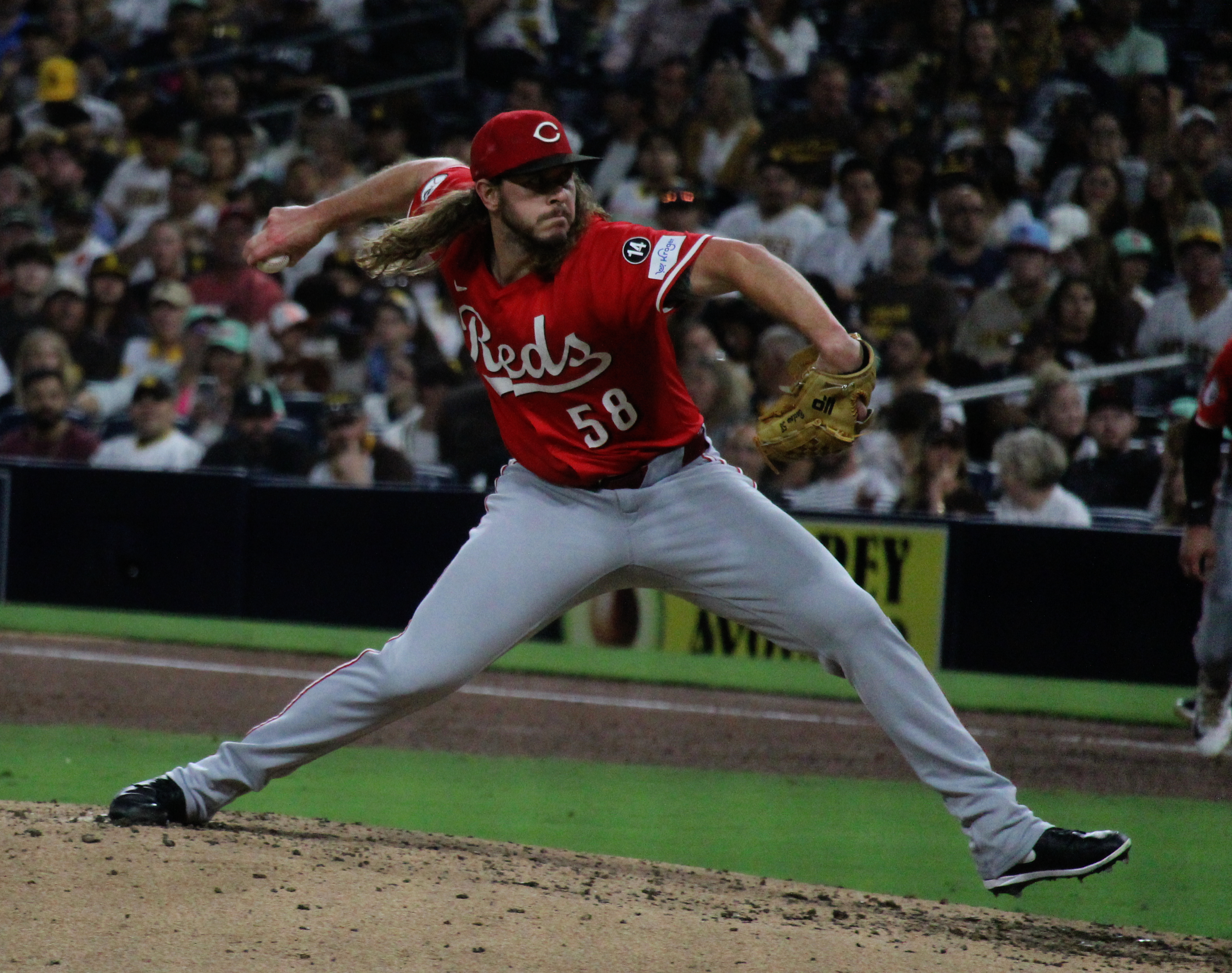
- Barlow with the Cincinnati Reds in 2025

Free agent
- Pitcher
- Born: December 18, 1992 (age 33); New London, Connecticut, U.S.
- Bats: Right Throws: Right

MLB debut
- April 30, 2018, for the Kansas City Royals

MLB statistics (through June 20, 2026)
- Win–loss record: 31–24
- Earned run average: 3.79
- Strikeouts: 565
- Saves: 61
- Stats at Baseball Reference

Teams
- Kansas City Royals (2018–2023); San Diego Padres (2023); Cleveland Guardians (2024); Cincinnati Reds (2025); Athletics (2026)

Scott Alen Barlow (born December 18, 1992) is an American professional baseball pitcher who is a free agent. He has previously played in Major League Baseball (MLB) for the Kansas City Royals, San Diego Padres, Cleveland Guardians, Cincinnati Reds, and Athletics. He made his MLB debut in 2018.

== Career ==
=== Amateur career ===
Barlow is originally from New London, Connecticut. His family moved to California for his freshman year of high school, so he could play baseball year-round and have more exposure to professional scouts. He attended Golden Valley High School in Santa Clarita, California. Barlow committed to attend California State University, Fresno to play college baseball for the Fresno State Bulldogs.

=== Los Angeles Dodgers ===
The Los Angeles Dodgers selected Barlow in the sixth round of the 2011 MLB draft and he signed with the Dodgers rather than attend Fresno State. After signing, Barlow made his professional debut that same year with the rookie–level Arizona League Dodgers, giving up five earned runs in 1 2/3 innings pitched for the season. In 2012, he underwent Tommy John surgery and missed the whole season. He returned in 2013, pitching for the Ogden Raptors, compiling a 4–3 record and 6.20 ERA in 15 starts.

In 2014, Barlow played for the Great Lakes Loons where he was 6–7 with a 4.50 ERA in 23 games (21 starts) and in 2015 he pitched with the Rancho Cucamonga Quakes where he was 8–3 with a 2.52 ERA in 14 games (13 starts). He also pitched one game each with Great Lakes and the Oklahoma City Dodgers. Barlow spent 2016 with the Tulsa Drillers where he posted a 4–7 record with a 3.98 ERA and 1.42 WHIP in 24 games (23 starts), and 2017 with Tulsa and Oklahoma City where he compiled a combined 7–6 record and 3.29 ERA in 26 starts. He elected free agency following the season on November 6, 2017.

=== Kansas City Royals ===
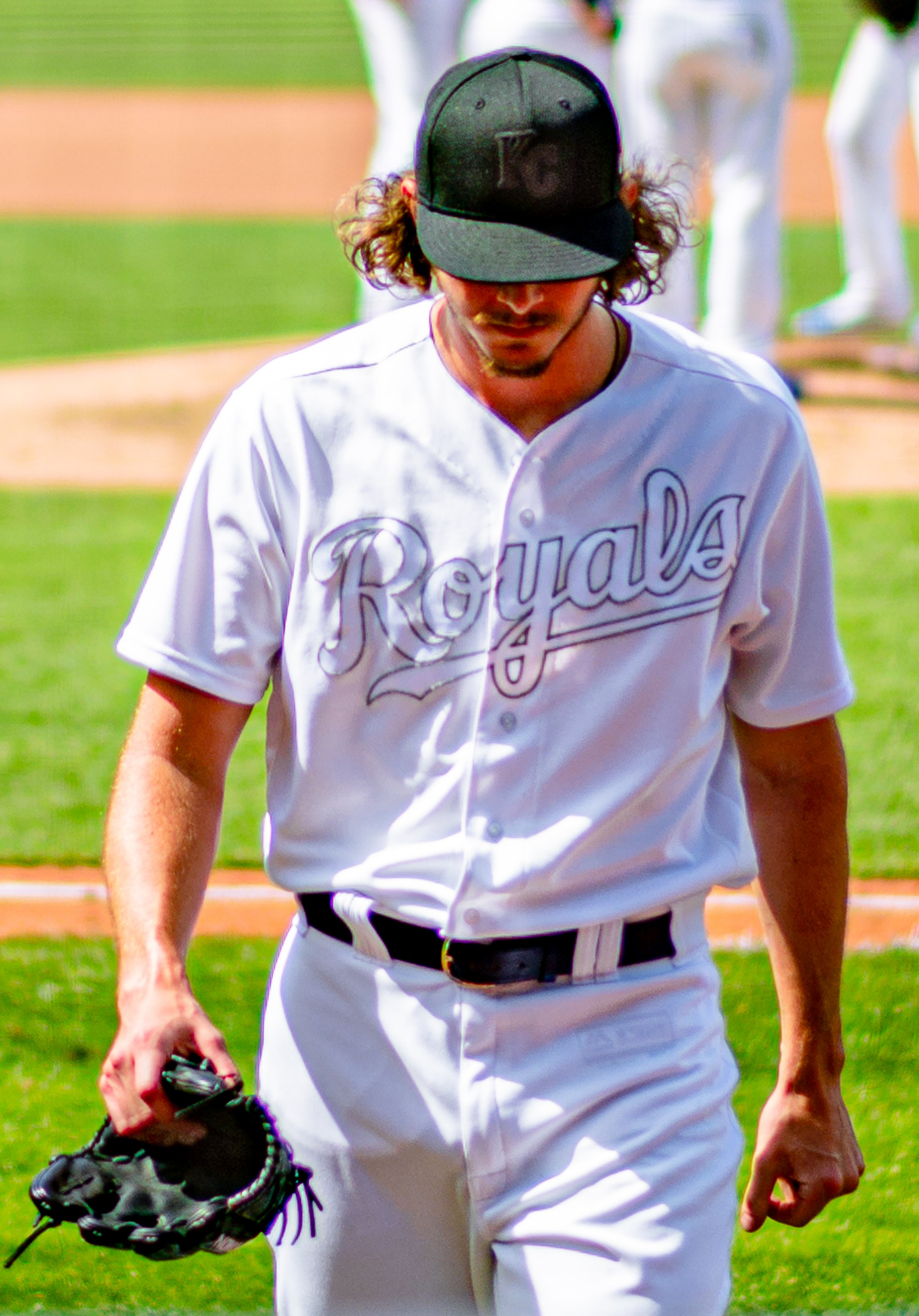
Barlow in 2019

On December 7, 2017, Barlow signed a major league contract with the Kansas City Royals. He began 2018 with the Omaha Storm Chasers.

The Royals promoted Barlow to the major leagues three times in April 2018; the first two times, he was sent back to Triple-A without making an appearance. Following his third call-up on April 28, Barlow made his MLB debut on April 30, pitching in relief against the Boston Red Sox. On October 29, 2018, he was selected to play for the MLB All-Stars in the 2018 MLB Japan All-Star Series.

Barlow made the Royals' 2019 Opening Day roster. On April 17, he earned he first major league save by closing out a 4–3 win against the Chicago White Sox.

With the 2020 Kansas City Royals, Barlow appeared in a league-high 32 games, compiling a 2–1 record with 4.20 ERA and 39 strikeouts in 30 innings pitched.

On March 22, 2022, Barlow signed a $2.4 million contract with the Royals, avoiding salary arbitration.

=== San Diego Padres ===
On August 1, 2023, the Royals traded Barlow to the San Diego Padres in exchange for prospects Jesús Rios and Henry Williams. In 25 games for San Diego, Barlow pitched to a 3.07 ERA with 32 strikeouts across 29 1/3 innings pitched.

=== Cleveland Guardians ===
On November 17, 2023, Barlow was traded to the Cleveland Guardians in exchange for Enyel De Los Santos. In 63 appearances for the Guardians in 2024, he compiled a 3–3 record and 4.25 ERA with 68 strikeouts over 55 innings pitched. Barlow was designated for assignment by Cleveland on September 8. He was released by Cleveland on September 12.

=== Cincinnati Reds ===
On February 13, 2025, Barlow signed a one-year, $1.5 million contract with the Cincinnati Reds. He made 75 appearances (including one start) for Cincinnati during the regular season, compiling a 6-3 record and 4.21 ERA with 75 strikeouts and one save across 68 1/3 innings pitched. On November 5, the Reds declined his 2026 option, making him a free agent.

=== Athletics ===
On February 10, 2026, Barlow signed a one-year, $2 million contract with the Athletics. He made 36 relief appearances for the team, posting a 2-0 record and 6.48 ERA with 29 strikeouts and two saves across 33 1/3 innings pitched. Barlow was designated for assignment by the Athletics on June 21. He was released after clearing waivers on June 24.

=== Kansas City Royals (second stint) ===
On July 1, 2026, Barlow signed a minor league contract with the Kansas City Royals. He made 11 appearances for the Triple–A Omaha Storm Chasers, recording a 5.65 ERA with 14 strikeouts across 14 1/3 innings pitched. Barlow was released by the Royals organization on August 20.

== Personal life ==
As of 2021, Barlow and his wife, Klancy, live in a campervan during the baseball season. They had their first child in July 2025.
