= 2026 Kansas City Royals season =

2026 Kansas City Royals
- League: American League
- Division: Central
- Ballpark: Kauffman Stadium
- City: Kansas City, Missouri
- Record: 69–93 (.426)
- Divisional place: 5th
- Owners: John Sherman
- General manager: J.J. Picollo
- Manager: Matt Quatraro
- Television: MLB Local Media
- Radio: KFNZ 96.5 The Fan

The 2026 Kansas City Royals season was the 58th season for the franchise, and their 54th at Kauffman Stadium.

On June 26, the Royals went on the road and lost to the Chicago White Sox by the score of 22–1 to make the 21-run differential the worst loss in franchise history.

On July 25, longtime catcher Salvador Pérez surpassed Hall of Famer George Brett's 317 career home runs to become the Royals all-time leader in home runs.

On September 7, the Royals failed to improve on their 82–80 record from last season after losing to the Arizona Diamondbacks in 10 innings. They were then eliminated from playoff contention for the second consecutive year on September 16 following the Cleveland Guardians' victory over the White Sox.

== Regular season ==
=== Transactions ===
==== Offseason ====
- November 10 – acquired outfielder Kameron Misner from the Tampa Bay Rays for a player to be named later.
- November 11 – acquired right-handed pitcher Mason Black from the San Francisco Giants in exchange for right-handed pitcher Logan Martin.
- November 20 – signed free-agent right-handed pitcher Alex Lange.
- December 14 – acquired outfielder Isaac Collins and right-handed pitcher Nick Mears from the Milwaukee Brewers in exchange for left-handed pitcher Angel Zerpa.
- December 17 – signed free-agent outfielder Lane Thomas.
- December 19 – acquired left-handed pitcher Matt Strahm from the Philadelphia Phillies in exchange for right-handed pitcher Jonathan Bowlan.
- February 12 – acquired right-handed pitcher Mitch Spence from the Athletics in exchange for right-handed pitcher A. J. Causey.
- March 2 – signed free-agent outfielder Starling Marte.
- March 8 – outfielder Dairon Blanco was claimed off waivers by the Texas Rangers.
- March 13 – traded right-handed pitcher Matthew Hoskins to the Tampa Bay Rays.

=== Regular Season ===
- May 29 – signed right-handed pitcher Dan Altavilla
- June 2 – claimed outfielder Matthew Lugo off waivers from the Los Angeles Angels.
- June 15 – acquired right-handed pitcher Connto Blue Jays in exchange for right-handedpitcher Denis Samudio and cash.
- June 17 – acquired right-handed pitcher Rand Mariners for cash.

=== American League Central ===
AL Central
Team	W	L	Pct.	GB	Home	Road
Cleveland Guardians	85	77	.525	—	41‍–‍40	44‍–‍37
Chicago White Sox	84	78	.519	1	48‍–‍33	36‍–‍45
Minnesota Twins	77	85	.475	8	42‍–‍39	35‍–‍46
Detroit Tigers	76	86	.469	9	42‍–‍39	34‍–‍47
Kansas City Royals	69	93	.426	16	41‍–‍40	28‍–‍53

=== American League Wild Card ===
Division leaders
Team	W	L	Pct.
Tampa Bay Rays	98	64	.605
Cleveland Guardians	85	77	.525
Houston Astros	81	81	.500

Wild Card teams (Top 3 teams qualify for postseason)
Team	W	L	Pct.	GB
New York Yankees	93	68	.578	+9½
Boston Red Sox	87	75	.537	+3
Chicago White Sox	84	78	.519	—
Texas Rangers	80	82	.494	4
Baltimore Orioles	79	82	.491	4½
Toronto Blue Jays	79	83	.488	5
Minnesota Twins	77	85	.475	7
Detroit Tigers	76	86	.469	8
Seattle Mariners	76	86	.469	8
Kansas City Royals	69	93	.426	15
Athletics	64	98	.395	20
Los Angeles Angels	62	100	.383	22

=== Record against opponents ===
2026 American League record Source: MLB Standings Grid – 2026
Team	ATH	BAL	BOS	CWS	CLE	DET	HOU	KC	LAA	MIN	NYY	SEA	TB	TEX	TOR	NL
Athletics	—	2–4	3–4	1–5	1–5	0–6	6–7	2–5	8–5	3–3	3–3	7–6	0–6	7–6	2–4	19–29
Baltimore	4–2	—	4–9	4–2	3–4	4–2	5–1	5–1	3–3	3–3	3–9	3–4	8–5	2–4	7–6	21–27
Boston	4–3	9–4	—	6–0	3–3	5–2	1–5	5–1	4–2	1–5	6–7	3–3	6–7	3–3	4–9	27–21
Chicago	5–1	2–4	0–6	—	7–6	9–4	2–5	9–4	4–2	8–5	3–4	3–3	2–4	4–2	5–1	21–27
Cleveland	5–1	4–3	3–3	6–7	—	10–3	2–4	7–6	6–0	6–7	2–4	4–3	1–5	2–4	2–4	25–23
Detroit	6–0	2–4	2–5	4–9	3–10	—	2–5	6–7	3–3	5–8	4–2	4–2	4–2	4–2	3–3	24–24
Houston	7–6	1–5	5–1	5–2	4–2	5–2	—	4–2	7–6	2–4	3–3	3–10	2–4	9–4	3–3	21–27
Kansas City	5–2	1–5	1–5	4–9	6–7	7–6	2–4	—	5–1	8–5	0–6	5–1	2–5	1–5	3–3	19–29
Los Angeles	5–8	3–3	2–4	2–4	0–6	3–3	6–7	1–5	—	3–4	3–4	6–7	3–3	8–5	2–4	15–33
Minnesota	3–3	3–3	5–1	5–8	7–6	8–5	4–2	5–8	4–3	—	3–3	2–4	1–5	5–1	4–3	18–30
New York	3–3	9–3	7–6	4–3	4–2	2–4	3–3	6–0	4–3	3–3	—	4–2	6–7	4–2	7–6	27–21
Seattle	6–7	4–3	3–3	3–3	3–4	2–4	10–3	1–5	7–6	4–2	2–4	—	1–5	5–8	2–4	23–25
Tampa Bay	6–0	5–8	7–6	4–2	5–1	2–4	4–2	5–2	3–3	5–1	7–6	5–1	—	4–3	9–4	27–21
Texas	6–7	4–2	3–3	2–4	4–2	2–4	4–9	5–1	5–8	1–5	2–4	8–5	3–4	—	6–1	25–23
Toronto	4–2	6–7	9–4	1–5	4–2	3–3	3–3	3–3	4–2	3–4	6–7	4–2	4–9	1–6	—	24–24

Updated with the results of all games through September 27, 2026.

=== Game log ===
Legend
Royals Win	Royals Loss	Game postponed	Eliminated from playoff spot

2026 Game Log: 69–93 (Home: 41–40; Road: 28–53)
March/April: 12–19 (Home: 9–7; Road: 3–12)

#	Date	Opponent	Score	Win	Loss	Save	Attendance	Record	Streak
1	March 27	@ Braves	0–6	Sale (1–0)	Ragans (0–1)	—	39,697	0–1	L1
2	March 28	@ Braves	2–6	Bido (1–0)	Estévez (0–1)	—	39,362	0–2	L2
3	March 29	@ Braves	4–1	Lugo (1–0)	Holmes (0–1)	Erceg (1)	37,961	1–2	W1
4	March 30	Twins	3–1	Bubic (1–0)	Woods Richardson (0–1)	Schreiber (1)	39,320	2–2	W2
5	April 1	Twins	13–9	Cameron (1–0)	Ryan (0–1)	Erceg (2)	10,870	3–2	W3
6	April 2	Twins	1–5	Bradley (1–0)	Ragans (0–2)	—	11,694	3–3	L1
-	April 3	Brewers	Postponed (rain) (Makeup date: April 4)						
7	April 4 (1)	Brewers	2–5	Patrick (1–0)	Avila (0–1)	Megill (2)	17,055	3–4	L2
8	April 4 (2)	Brewers	8–2	Mears (1–0)	Sproat (0–1)	Morgan (1)	12,732	4–4	W1
9	April 5	Brewers	5–8	Harrison (1–0)	Bubic (1–1)	Megill (3)	14,584	4–5	L1
10	April 6	@ Guardians	4–2	Wacha (1–0)	Pallette (0–1)	Erceg (3)	13,143	5–5	W1
11	April 7	@ Guardians	1–2	Smith (2–0)	Schreiber (0–1)	—	10,328	5–6	L1
12	April 8	@ Guardians	2–10	Cantillo (1–0)	Ragans (0–3)	Festa (1)	14,734	5–7	L2
13	April 9	White Sox	0–2	Kay (1–0)	Lugo (1–1)	Domínguez (2)	13,001	5–8	L3
14	April 10	White Sox	2–0	Bubic (2–1)	Martin (2–1)	Erceg (4)	12,907	6–8	W1
15	April 11	White Sox	2–0	Wacha (2–0)	Fedde (0–3)	Erceg (5)	16,214	7–8	W2
16	April 12	White Sox	5–6	Leasure (1–0)	Schreiber (0–2)	Domínguez (3)	20,552	7–9	L1
17	April 14	@ Tigers	1–2	Vest (1–2)	Mears (1–1)	Jansen (3)	16,655	7–10	L2
18	April 15	@ Tigers	1–2	Finnegan (1–0)	Morgan (0–1)	Jansen (4)	19,609	7–11	L3
19	April 16	@ Tigers	9–10	Seabold (1–0)	Erceg (0–1)	—	15,034	7–12	L4
20	April 17	@ Yankees	2–4	Doval (1–0)	Lange (0–1)	Bednar (6)	44,244	7–13	L5
21	April 18	@ Yankees	4–13	Warren (2–0)	Cameron (1–1)	—	42,070	7–14	L6
22	April 19	@ Yankees	0–7	Weathers (1–2)	Ragans (0–4)	—	40,198	7–15	L7
23	April 20	Orioles	5–7 (12)	Nunez (1–0)	Lange (0–2)	—	13,589	7–16	L8
24	April 21	Orioles	6–5	Erceg (1–1)	Helsley (0–2)	—	15,164	8–16	W1
25	April 22	Orioles	6–8	Bassitt (1–2)	Wacha (2–1)	Nunez (1)	14,175	8–17	L1
26	April 24	Angels	6–3	Cameron (2–1)	Kikuchi (0–3)	Erceg (6)	19,079	9–17	W1
27	April 25	Angels	12–1	Ragans (1–4)	Ureña (0–3)	—	22,152	10–17	W2
28	April 26	Angels	11–9 (10)	Erceg (2–1)	Lucchesi (0–1)	—	11,579	11–17	W3
29	April 28	@ Athletics	4–1 (10)	Mears (2–1)	Sterner (1–3)	Erceg (7)	9,274	12–17	W4
30	April 29	@ Athletics	2–5	Severino (2–2)	Wacha (2–2)	Leiter Jr. (3)	9,399	12–18	L1
31	April 30	@ Athletics	3–6	Medina (1–1)	Cameron (2–2)	Perkins (3)	9,333	12–19	L2

May: 10–18 (Home: 6–10; Road: 4–8)

#	Date	Opponent	Score	Win	Loss	Save	Attendance	Record	Streak
32	May 1	@ Mariners	7–6	Lynch IV (1–0)	Ferrer (0–1)	Erceg (8)	36,384	13–19	W1
33	May 2	@ Mariners	3–2 (10)	Strahm (1–0)	Criswell (1–1)	Erceg (9)	42,794	14–19	W2
34	May 3	@ Mariners	4–1	Bubic (3–1)	Castillo (0–3)	Lynch IV (1)	39,408	15–19	W3
35	May 4	Guardians	6–2	Wacha (3–2)	Bibee (0–5)	—	16,434	16–19	W4
36	May 5	Guardians	5–3	Kolek (1–0)	Williams (5–2)	Erceg (10)	13,102	17–19	W5
37	May 6	Guardians	1–3	Cantillo (2–1)	Avila (0–2)	Smith (9)	13,039	17–20	L1
38	May 7	Guardians	5–8	Cecconi (2–4)	Lugo (1–2)	Smith (10)	24,892	17–21	L2
39	May 8	Tigers	4–3	Erceg (3–1)	Hurter (4–1)	—	29,374	18–21	W1
40	May 9	Tigers	5–1	Wacha (4–2)	Smith (0–2)	—	26,724	19–21	W2
41	May 10	Tigers	3–6	De Jesus (2–0)	Mears (2–2)	Jansen (7)	17,295	19–22	L1
42	May 12	@ White Sox	5–6	Domínguez (3–3)	Strahm (1–1)	Hudson (2)	13,256	19–23	L2
43	May 13	@ White Sox	5–6	Davis (1–1)	Lugo (1–3)	Domínguez (10)	11,905	19–24	L3
44	May 14	@ White Sox	2–6	Kay (3–1)	Bubic (3–2)	Newcomb (1)	14,913	19–25	L4
45	May 15	@ Cardinals	4–5 (11)	Graceffo (3–1)	Cruz (0–1)	—	26,949	19–26	L5
46	May 16	@ Cardinals	2–4	Leahy (5–3)	Cameron (2–3)	Soriano (2)	32,379	19–27	L6
47	May 17	@ Cardinals	2–0	Kolek (2–0)	Pallante (4–4)	Erceg (11)	38,051	20–27	W1
48	May 18	Red Sox	1–3	Gray (5–1)	Lugo (1–4)	Chapman (11)	15,531	20–28	L1
49	May 19	Red Sox	1–7	Whitlock (3–1)	Falter (0–1)	—	14,047	20–29	L2
50	May 20	Red Sox	3–4	Early (4–2)	Cruz (0–2)	Chapman (12)	14,091	20–30	L3
51	May 22	Mariners	0–2	Bazardo (3–2)	Mears (2–3)	Muñoz (9)	18,842	20–31	L4
52	May 23	Mariners	5–0	Kolek (3–0)	Kirby (5–4)	—	25,544	21–31	W1
53	May 24	Mariners	8–6	Lugo (2–4)	Woo (4–3)	—	25,014	22–31	W2
54	May 25	Yankees	3–4	Hill (2–2)	Erceg (3–2)	Bednar (12)	26,162	22–32	L1
55	May 26	Yankees	1–15	Schlittler (7–2)	Falter (0–2)	Yarbrough (1)	21,947	22–33	L2
56	May 27	Yankees	0–7	Cole (1–0)	Cameron (2–4)	—	17,007	22–34	L3
57	May 29	@ Rangers	1–9	Gore (4–4)	Kolek (3–1)	—	39,704	22–35	L4
58	May 30	@ Rangers	6–7	Gray (1–0)	Erceg (3–3)	—	32,270	22–36	L5
59	May 31	@ Rangers	3–6	Leiter (3–4)	Wacha (4–3)	Latz (7)	33,587	22–37	L6

June: 13–14 (Home: 4–6; Road: 9–8)

#	Date	Opponent	Score	Win	Loss	Save	Attendance	Record	Streak
60	June 1	@ Reds	9–2	Avila (1–2)	Richardson (0–1)	—	19,409	23–37	W1
61	June 2	@ Reds	3–4 (10)	Burke (2–2)	Schreiber (0–3)	—	25,824	23–38	L1
62	June 3	@ Reds	5–2	Lynch IV (2–0)	Santillan (1–3)	Lange (1)	15,959	24–38	W1
63	June 4	@ Twins	8–6	Strahm (2–1)	Rogers (1–3)	Lange (2)	17,802	25–38	W2
64	June 5	@ Twins	3–5	Matthews (2–3)	Wacha (4–4)	Adams (2)	19,805	25–39	L1
65	June 6	@ Twins	3–2	Strahm (3–1)	Orze (2–2)	Lange (3)	20,555	26–39	W1
66	June 7	@ Twins	6–5	Cameron (3–4)	Prielipp (2–4)	Erceg (12)	19,876	27–39	W2
67	June 9	Rangers	5–3	Cruz (1–2)	Eovaldi (5–7)	Lange (4)	25,075	28–39	W3
68	June 10	Rangers	4–6 (10)	Junis (1–1)	Lange (0–3)	Latz (10)	16,015	28–40	L1
69	June 11	Rangers	2–4	Ahlstrom (1–0)	Wacha (4–5)	Latz (11)	17,622	28–41	L2
70	June 12	Astros	8–10	Pearson (1–0)	Avila (1–3)	Hader (2)	25,672	28–42	L3
71	June 13	Astros	7–8	King (1–1)	Lange (0–4)	Abreu (5)	17,881	28–43	L4
72	June 14	Astros	4–0	Kolek (4–1)	Arrighetti (7–2)	—	23,730	29–43	W1
73	June 15	@ Nationals	3–7	Lord (5–0)	Spence (0–1)	—	14,444	29–44	L1
74	June 16	@ Nationals	4–6	Schultz (1–2)	Lynch IV (2–1)	Varland (6)	25,053	29–45	L2
75	June 17	@ Nationals	6–2	Avila (2–3)	Littell (6–6)	—	17,643	30–45	W1
76	June 18	Cardinals	14–6	Cameron (4–4)	Liberatore (3–4)	—	18,363	31–45	W2
77	June 19	Cardinals	6–5	Lugo (3–4)	McGreevy (3–6)	Lange (5)	27,323	32–45	W3
78	June 21	Cardinals	10–12	Graceffo (5–1)	Kolek (4–2)	—	28,309	32–46	L1
79	June 22	@ Rays	2–1	Wacha (5–5)	Rasmussen (6–4)	Lange (6)	11,298	33–46	W1
80	June 23	@ Rays	12–5	Avila (3–3)	McClanahan (6–5)	—	11,171	34–46	W2
81	June 24	@ Rays	3–5	Jax (3–5)	Cameron (4–5)	Baker (20)	11,857	34–47	L1
82	June 25	@ Rays	2–13	Seymour (4–1)	Lugo (3–5)	—	14,276	34–48	L2
83	June 26	@ White Sox	1–22	Sandlin (2–1)	Spence (0–2)	—	31,130	34–49	L3
84	June 27	@ White Sox	1–2	Taylor (3–1)	Lynch IV (2–2)	—	28,569	34–50	L4
85	June 28	@ White Sox	5–4	Cruz (2–2)	Kay (6–3)	Lange (7)	27,301	35–50	W1
86	June 30	Rays	4–10	Jax (4–5)	Cameron (4–6)	—	15,014	35–51	L1

July: 11–14 (Home: 7–4; Road: 4–10)

#	Date	Opponent	Score	Win	Loss	Save	Attendance	Record	Streak
87	July 1	Rays	0–4	McClanahan (7–5)	Lugo (3–6)	Kelly (4)	13,798	35–52	L2
88	July 2	Rays	2–5	Seymour (5–1)	Kolek (4–3)	Baker (22)	16,814	35–53	L3
89	July 4	Phillies	1–6	Luzardo (7–4)	Wacha (5–6)	—	30,419	35–54	L4
90	July 5	Phillies	5–2	Avila (4–3)	Nola (3–6)	Lange (8)	14,891	36–54	W1
91	July 6	Phillies	15–1	Cameron (5–6)	Sánchez (10–4)	—	13,496	37–54	W2
92	July 7	@ Mets	16–12	Way (1–0)	Seelinger (0–1)	—	32,734	38–54	W3
93	July 8	@ Mets	2–6	Raley (4–3)	Lange (0–5)	—	32,227	38–55	L1
94	July 9	@ Mets	3–7	Manaea (2–4)	Wacha (5–7)	—	33,868	38–56	L2
95	July 10	@ Orioles	3–5	Garcia (4–1)	Strahm (3–2)	Kittredge (3)	26,993	38–57	L3
96	July 11	@ Orioles	1–6	Bradish (6–9)	Cameron (5–7)	—	28,958	38–58	L4
97	July 12	@ Orioles	2–8	Wolfram (2–2)	Strahm (3–3)	—	31,355	38–59	L5
96th All-Star Game in Philadelphia, Pennsylvania
98	July 17	Padres	7–6 (10)	Erceg (4–3)	Hart (0–2)	—	25,884	39–59	W1
99	July 18	Padres	6–1	Lynch IV (3–2)	Canning (1–8)	—	23,347	40–59	W2
100	July 19	Padres	2–19	Matsui (1–1)	Cameron (5–8)	—	18,383	40–60	L1
101	July 20	Giants	4–3	Lange (1–5)	Kilian (2–6)	—	16,411	41–60	W1
102	July 21	Giants	3–2	Avila (5–3)	Mahle (2–9)	Lange (9)	25,175	42–60	W2
103	July 22	Giants	5–4	Lugo (4–6)	Hentges (1–3)	Cruz (1)	14,606	43–60	W3
104	July 23	@ Tigers	3–4	Anderson (4–4)	Cruz (2–3)	Finnegan (2)	35,548	43–61	L1
105	July 24	@ Tigers	1–2	Skubal (7–5)	Way (1–1)	Jansen (12)	40,638	43–62	L2
106	July 25	@ Tigers	3–2	Lynch IV (4–2)	Waguespack (0–1)	Lange (10)	32,867	44–62	W1
107	July 26	@ Tigers	5–4	Pearson (2–0)	Sommers (0–1)	Cruz (2)	29,489	45–62	W2
108	July 28	@ Twins	2–3	Anderson (1–0)	Lange (1–6)	—	21,518	45–63	L1
109	July 29	@ Twins	4–0	Dobnak (1–0)	Ryan (6–7)	—	18,728	46–63	W1
110	July 30	@ Twins	3–4	Gómez (2–0)	Strahm (3–4)	—	22,944	46–64	L1
111	July 31	@ Rockies	1–3	Sugano (11–4)	Wacha (5–8)	Romano (9)	39,317	46–65	L2

August: 16–11 (Home: 10–3; Road: 6–8)

#	Date	Opponent	Score	Win	Loss	Save	Attendance	Record	Streak
112	August 1	@ Rockies	6–12	Feltner (4–5)	Avila (5–4)	—	40,216	46–66	L3
113	August 2	@ Rockies	1–8	Freeland (3–10)	Lugo (4–7)	—	32,226	46–67	L4
114	August 4	Twins	8–2	Dobnak (2–0)	Ryan (6–8)	—	20,177	47–67	W1
115	August 5	Twins	2–1	Cameron (6–8)	Minter (1–2)	Cruz (3)	13,439	48–67	W2
116	August 6	Twins	3–4	Funderburk (3–1)	Bummer (1–2)	Gómez (15)	16,036	48–68	L1
117	August 7	Cubs	4–6	Gausman (6–10)	Lynch IV (4–3)	Webb (7)	26,083	48–69	L2
118	August 8	Cubs	6–3	Lugo (5–7)	Holmes (4–5)	Pearson (2)	32,326	49–69	W1
119	August 9	Cubs	2–10	Boyd (8–1)	Dobnak (2–1)	—	24,225	49–70	L1
120	August 10	@ Dodgers	5–6	Dreyer (5–1)	Lange (1–7)	Díaz (6)	51,799	49–71	L2
121	August 11	@ Dodgers	4–5 (10)	Halvorsen (1–1)	Erceg (4–4)	—	49,958	49–72	L3
122	August 12	@ Dodgers	2–4	Lauer (7–6)	Lynch IV (4–4)	Knack (1)	47,578	49–73	L4
123	August 14	@ Angels	7–6	Lange (2–7)	Saucedo (0–1)	Cruz (4)	23,139	50–73	W1
124	August 15	@ Angels	0–1	Detmers (4–8)	Pearson (2–1)	Joyce (2)	30,002	50–74	L1
125	August 16	@ Angels	3–0	Cameron (7–8)	Johnson (2–7)	—	28,036	51–74	W1
126	August 17	Athletics	9–5	Wacha (6–8)	Barnett (1–4)	Cruz (5)	12,438	52–74	W2
127	August 18	Athletics	4–3	Durán (1–0)	Harris (3–2)	—	12,009	53–74	W3
128	August 19	Athletics	9–7	Kimbrel (1–2)	Rom (1–1)	—	11,579	54–74	W4
129	August 20	Athletics	6–2	Thomas (1–1)	Jump (5–8)	—	11,867	55–74	W5
130	August 21	Tigers	5–2	Cameron (8–8)	Melton (7–2)	Pearson (3)	29,535	56–74	W6
131	August 22	Tigers	3–1	Wacha (7–8)	Anderson (4–5)	Kimbrel (1)	23,156	57–74	W7
132	August 23	Tigers	11–7	Schreiber (1–3)	Sears (0–1)	—	21,269	58–74	W8
133	August 25	@ Blue Jays	5–3	Lugo (6–7)	Scherzer (1–7)	—	43,245	59–74	W9
134	August 26	@ Blue Jays	0–3	Dallas (2–1)	Dobnak (2–2)	Varland (30)	42,323	59–75	L1
135	August 27	@ Blue Jays	13–2	Cameron (9–8)	Arrighetti (7–7)	—	42,621	60–75	W1
136	August 28	@ Guardians	3–0	Wacha (8–8)	Bibee (5–14)	Cruz (6)	31,941	61–75	W2
137	August 29	@ Guardians	8–3	Gose (1–0)	Holderman (6–4)	—	31,509	62–75	W3
138	August 30	@ Guardians	1–11	Messick (11–8)	Lugo (6–8)	—	28,448	62–76	L1

September: 7–17 (Home: 5–10; Road: 2–7)

#	Date	Opponent	Score	Win	Loss	Save	Attendance	Record	Streak
139	September 1	Marlins	3–6	Phillips (4–6)	Dobnak (2–3)	—	13,330	62–77	L2
140	September 2	Marlins	6–9	Gibson (3–1)	Cuas (0–1)	Faucher (3)	10,913	62–78	L3
141	September 3	Marlins	7–3	Wacha (9–8)	Alcántara (13–9)	—	10,803	63–78	W1
142	September 4	Blue Jays	2–9	Mantiply (2–0)	Lynch IV (4–5)	Lorenzen (1)	18,218	63–79	L1
143	September 5	Blue Jays	3–4	Fluharty (6–1)	Kimbrel (1–3)	Varland (33)	20,547	63–80	L2
144	September 6	Blue Jays	6–1	Dobnak (3–3)	Arrighetti (7–9)	—	17,518	64–80	W1
145	September 7	Diamondbacks	4–5 (10)	Martínez (2–0)	Kimbrel (1–4)	Santana (3)	18,912	64–81	L1
146	September 8	Diamondbacks	3–5 (11)	Walston (1–0)	Gose (1–1)	—	13,361	64–82	L2
147	September 9	Diamondbacks	5–2	Lynch IV (5–5)	Soroka (8–5)	Pearson (4)	15,369	65–82	W1
148	September 11	@ Red Sox	3–2	Lugo (7–8)	Gray (17–5)	Cruz (7)	36,890	66–82	W2
149	September 12	@ Red Sox	1–5	Suárez (7–4)	Dobnak (3–4)	—	36,877	66–83	L1
150	September 13	@ Red Sox	1–4	Whitlock (7–1)	Kimbrel (1–5)	Chapman (34)	34,966	66–84	L2
151	September 15	@ Astros	2–4	Brown (6–3)	Wacha (9–9)	Hader (26)	28,635	66–85	L3
152	September 16	@ Astros	5–2	Lynch IV (6–5)	Javier (2–6)	—	28,497	67–85	W1
153	September 17	@ Astros	2–6	King (3–5)	Lugo (7–9)	—	34,853	67–86	L1
154	September 18	@ Pirates	5–8	Ramírez (7–4)	Pearson (2–2)	Soto (15)	25,424	67–87	L2
155	September 19	@ Pirates	5–6	Weaver (3–1)	Cruz (2–4)	Montgomery (15)	21,004	67–88	L3
156	September 20	@ Pirates	3–4	Mlodzinski (8–7)	Pearson (2–3)	Montgomery (16)	14,979	67–89	L4
157	September 22	White Sox	11–14	Schultz (4–9)	Lynch IV (6–6)	―	15,785	67–90	L5
158	September 23	White Sox	5–4	Thomas (2–1)	Smith (3–3)	Cruz (8)	17,114	68–90	W1
159	September 24	White Sox	1–9	Sandlin (3–2)	Dobnak (3–5)	—	15,592	68–91	L1
160	September 25	Guardians	9–12	Gaddis (6–3)	Pearson (2–4)	—	26,034	68–92	L2
161	September 26	Guardians	5–11	Bibee (7–15)	Wacha (9–10)	—	24,656	68–93	L3
162	September 27	Guardians	3–2	Pearson (3–4)	Peterson (0–1)	Erceg (13)	22,827	69–93	W1

== Roster ==
2026 Kansas City Royals
Roster
Pitchers: 58 Luinder Avila; 76 Spencer Bivens; 47 Mason Black; 50 Kris Bubic; 36 Aaron Bummer; 65 Noah Cameron; 61 Eric Cerantola; 64 Steven Cruz; 74 José Cuas; 62 Randy Dobnak; 45 Carlos Durán; 60 Lucas Erceg; 53 Carlos Estévez; 36 Bailey Falter; 36 Tony Gonsolin; 34 Anthony Gose; 35 Nolan Hoffman; 26 Craig Kimbrel; 32 Stephen Kolek; 56 Alex Lange; 67 Seth Lugo; 41 Daniel Lynch IV; 51 Easton McGee; 31 Nick Mears; 34 Eli Morgan; 61 Nate Pearson; 55 Cole Ragans; 46 John Schreiber; 43 Connor Seabold; 25 Matt Strahm; 50 Connor Thomas; 52 Michael Wacha; 44 Beck Way	Catchers: 43 Elías Díaz; 22 Carter Jensen; 18 Luke Maile; 13 Salvador Pérez; Infielders: 11 Maikel García; 6 Jonathan India; 12 Nick Loftin; 19 Michael Massey; 9 Vinnie Pasquantino; 40 Josh Rojas; 2 Tyler Tolbert; 45 Andrew Velazquez; 7 Bobby Witt Jr.	Outfielders: 14 Jac Caglianone; 1 Isaac Collins; 28 Kyle Isbel; 24 Matthew Lugo; 0 Starling Marte; 26 Kameron Misner; 16 John Rave; 15 Lane Thomas	Manager: 33 Matt Quatraro; Coaches: 68 José Alguacil (infield); 70 Connor Dawson (assistant hitting); 80 Allan de San Miguel (bullpen catcher); 82 Miguel Garcia (coach); 83 Juan Graterol (bullpen catcher); 39 Damon Hollins (first base); 49 Paul Hoover (bench); 84 Mike McFerran (assistant pitching); 57 Mitch Stetter (bullpen); 85 Brian Sweeney (pitching); 99 Marcus Thames (assistant hitting); 25 Vance Wilson (third base); 37 Alec Zumwalt (hitting)

== Player stats ==
= Indicates team leader

= Indicates league leader

=== Batting ===
Note: G = Games played; AB = At bats; R = Runs scored; H = Hits; 2B = Doubles; 3B = Triples; HR = Home runs; RBI = Runs batted in; SB = Stolen bases; BB = Walks; AVG = Batting average; SLG = Slugging average

Player	G	AB	R	H	2B	3B	HR	RBI	SB	BB	AVG	SLG
Salvador Perez	152	580	50	133	24	1	21	78	1	25	.229	.383
Bobby Witt Jr.	143	558	94	157	33	1	18	54	45	67	.281	.441
Carter Jensen	149	527	80	126	35	2	27	81	2	65	.239	.467
Jac Caglianone	143	512	72	148	32	2	23	75	7	33	.289	.494
Isaac Collins	145	442	47	94	24	3	6	40	8	64	.213	.321
Michael Massey	131	423	49	115	25	1	13	50	3	21	.272	.428
Vinnie Pasquantino	114	421	54	105	20	2	17	63	5	51	.249	.428
Nick Loftin	118	371	42	89	27	2	8	45	4	41	.240	.388
Maikel García	82	310	40	83	20	3	3	38	5	32	.268	.381
Kyle Isbel	100	294	32	66	9	1	6	24	6	15	.224	.323
Lane Thomas	97	285	31	66	16	0	10	37	7	39	.232	.393
Starling Marte	59	153	15	37	5	0	2	14	2	9	.242	.314
John Rave	52	142	26	33	8	1	6	13	8	17	.232	.430
Tyler Tolbert	78	130	32	37	5	0	3	8	22	12	.285	.392
Josh Rojas	43	106	11	24	4	0	2	14	1	5	.226	.321
Jonathan India	17	48	8	8	1	0	2	8	0	8	.167	.313
Luke Maile	18	44	2	7	2	0	1	5	0	4	.159	.273
Kameron Misner	18	41	2	9	1	0	0	4	3	2	.220	.244
Elías Díaz	10	22	3	5	2	0	2	5	0	1	.227	.591
Andrew Velazquez	6	15	0	1	0	0	0	0	1	0	.067	.067
Matthew Lugo	9	14	0	2	0	0	0	0	0	1	.143	.143
Totals	162	5438	690	1345	293	19	170	656	130	512	.247	.402

=== Pitching ===
Note: W = Wins; L = Losses; ERA = Earned run average; G = Games pitched; GS = Games started; SV = Saves; IP = Innings pitched; H = Hits allowed; R = Runs allowed; ER = Earned runs allowed; BB = Walks allowed; SO = Strikeouts

Player	W	L	ERA	G	GS	SV	IP	H	R	ER	BB	SO
Michael Wacha	9	10	3.32	32	32	0	200.2	168	82	74	54	158
Noah Cameron	9	8	4.11	31	30	0	177.1	160	87	81	58	158
Seth Lugo	7	9	5.17	32	32	0	172.1	200	107	99	54	134
Daniel Lynch IV	6	6	4.08	56	10	1	86.0	73	43	39	26	56
Randy Dobnak	3	5	3.51	15	13	0	74.1	78	31	29	26	49
Luinder Avila	5	4	5.53	21	12	0	70.0	71	43	43	42	61
Alex Lange	2	7	6.75	59	0	10	60.0	65	47	45	33	60
Steven Cruz	2	4	4.30	56	2	8	58.2	54	30	28	20	65
Stephen Kolek	4	3	4.50	10	10	0	54.0	55	30	27	12	34
Kris Bubic	3	2	4.11	9	9	0	50.1	36	23	23	26	51
John Schreiber	1	3	3.65	55	0	1	49.1	41	23	20	22	36
Lucas Erceg	4	4	5.59	52	0	13	48.1	55	35	30	32	34
Matt Strahm	3	4	7.32	41	0	0	35.2	39	29	29	14	30
Cole Ragans	1	4	4.84	8	8	0	35.1	27	20	19	23	45
Mason Black	0	0	4.31	17	0	0	31.1	30	16	15	20	19
Nate Pearson	2	4	4.50	26	0	3	26.0	21	13	13	14	25
Beck Way	1	1	3.86	19	1	0	23.1	27	13	10	10	21
José Cuas	0	1	2.31	24	0	0	23.1	26	7	6	15	25
Connor Thomas	2	0	2.33	17	0	0	19.1	17	5	5	3	14
Eli Morgan	0	1	5.12	16	0	1	19.1	24	11	11	9	16
Nick Mears	2	3	5.12	21	0	0	19.1	18	11	11	11	15
Anthony Gose	1	1	0.66	14	0	0	13.2	11	3	1	2	7
Craig Kimbrel	1	3	3.65	13	0	1	12.1	11	7	5	6	8
Nolan Hoffman	0	0	3.48	12	0	0	10.1	11	4	4	3	10
Bailey Falter	0	2	13.97	5	2	0	9.2	24	15	15	6	6
Mitch Spence	0	2	21.21	3	1	0	9.1	19	22	22	9	6
Easton McGee	0	0	8.68	7	0	0	9.1	16	9	9	4	8
Eric Cerantola	0	0	10.13	4	0	0	5.1	4	6	6	10	7
Connor Seabold	0	0	9.00	5	0	0	5.0	7	6	5	4	5
Tyler Tolbert	0	0	25.07	5	0	0	4.2	17	13	13	3	0
Spencer Bivens	0	0	0.00	2	0	0	2.2	2	0	0	2	4
Tony Gonsolin	0	0	16.88	1	0	0	2.2	4	5	5	3	5
Aaron Bummer	0	1	40.50	2	0	0	1.1	6	6	6	1	0
Carlos Durán	1	0	13.50	2	0	0	1.1	2	2	2	3	1
Josh Rojas	0	0	0.00	1	0	0	1.0	1	0	0	0	0
Luke Maile	0	0	0.00	1	0	0	1.0	0	0	0	0	0
Carlos Estévez	0	1	162.00	1	0	0	0.1	4	6	6	2	0
Totals	69	93	4.77	162	162	38	1424.1	1424	810	755	582	1173

== Farm system ==
Level	Team	League	Manager
AAA	Omaha Storm Chasers	International League	Patrick Osborn
AA	Northwest Arkansas Naturals	Texas League	Brooks Conrad
High-A	Quad Cities River Bandits	Midwest League	Jesus Azuaje
Low-A	Columbia Fireflies	Carolina League	David Noworyta
Rookie	ACL Royals	Arizona Complex League	Larry Sutton
Rookie	DSL Royals Fortuna	Dominican Summer League	Ramon Martinez
Rookie	DSL Royals Ventura	Dominican Summer League	Sergio De Luna
