= Misner =

Misner may refer to:

- Charles W. Misner (1932 – 2023), American physicist
- Kameron Misner, American baseball player
- Susan Misner, American actress and dancer
- Gravitation (book), a book by Misner, Thorne, and Wheeler
- sound engineer and record producer Tom Misner who founded SAE Institute Bangkok
