= Vinnie Pasquantino =

American baseball player (born 1997)

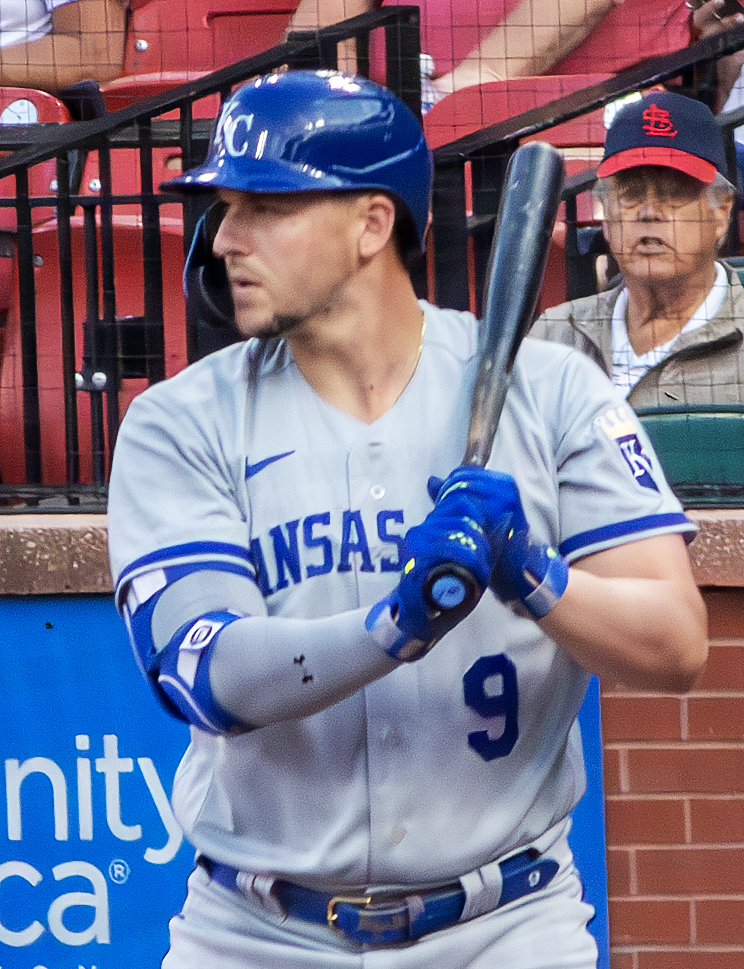
- Pasquantino with the Kansas City Royals in 2023

Kansas City Royals – No. 9
- First baseman / Designated hitter
- Born: October 10, 1997 (age 29); Richmond, Virginia, U.S.
- Bats: Left Throws: Left

MLB debut
- June 28, 2022, for the Kansas City Royals

MLB statistics (through 2026 season)
- Batting average: .262
- Home runs: 87
- Runs batted in: 325
- Stats at Baseball Reference

Teams
- Kansas City Royals (2022–present)

Vincent Joseph Pasquantino (born October 10, 1997), is an American professional baseball first baseman and designated hitter for the Kansas City Royals of Major League Baseball (MLB). Nicknamed "Pasquatch", he made his MLB debut in 2022. He represents Italy internationally.

== Amateur career ==
Pasquantino attended James River High School in Midlothian, Virginia. In 2016, he enrolled at Old Dominion University and played college baseball for the Old Dominion Monarchs. In 2018, he played collegiate summer baseball with the Hyannis Harbor Hawks of the Cape Cod Baseball League. After his junior season at Old Dominion, he was selected by the Kansas City Royals in the 11th round of the 2019 Major League Baseball draft.

== Professional career ==
=== Minor leagues ===
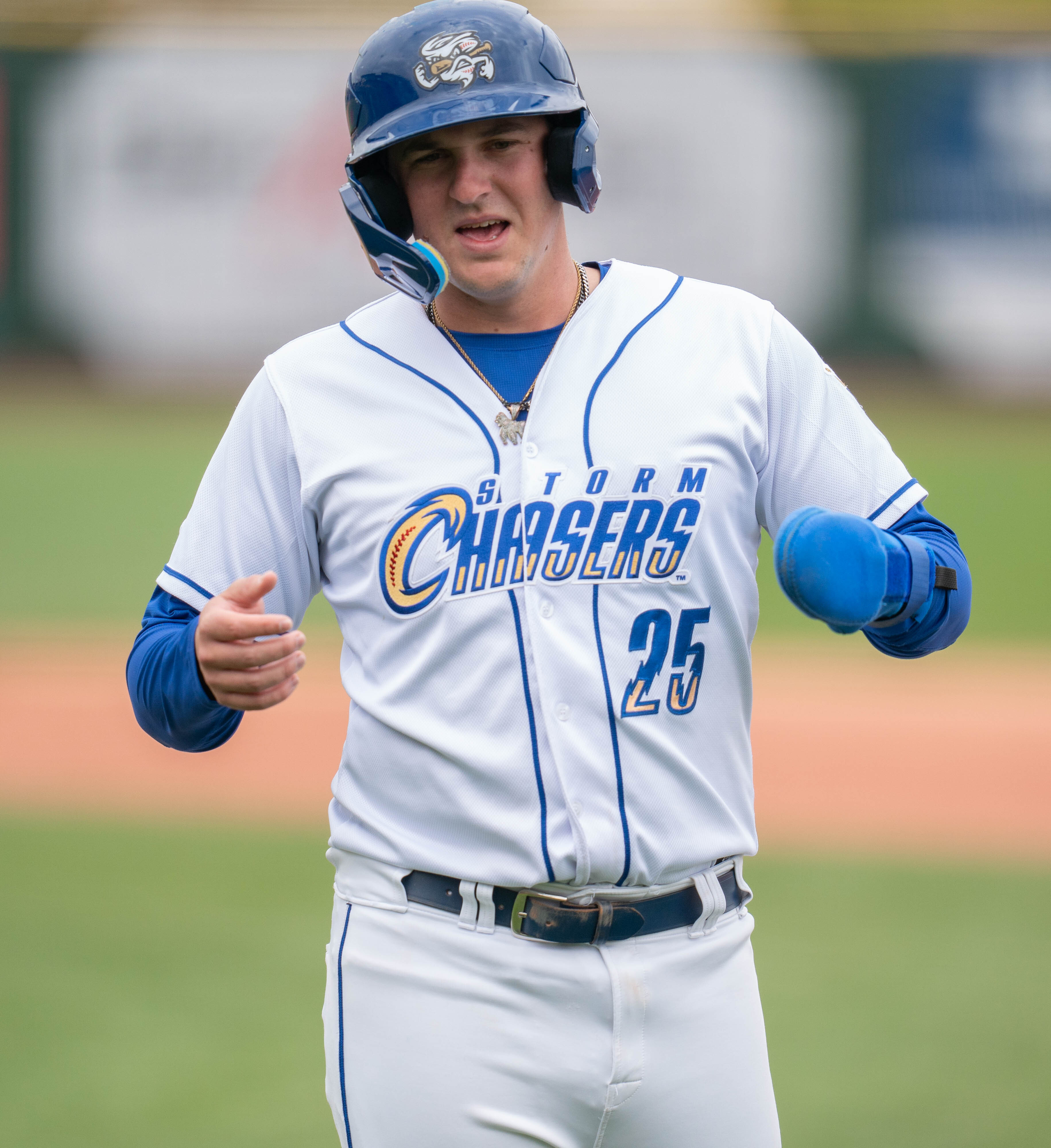
Pasquantino with the Omaha Storm Chasers in 2022

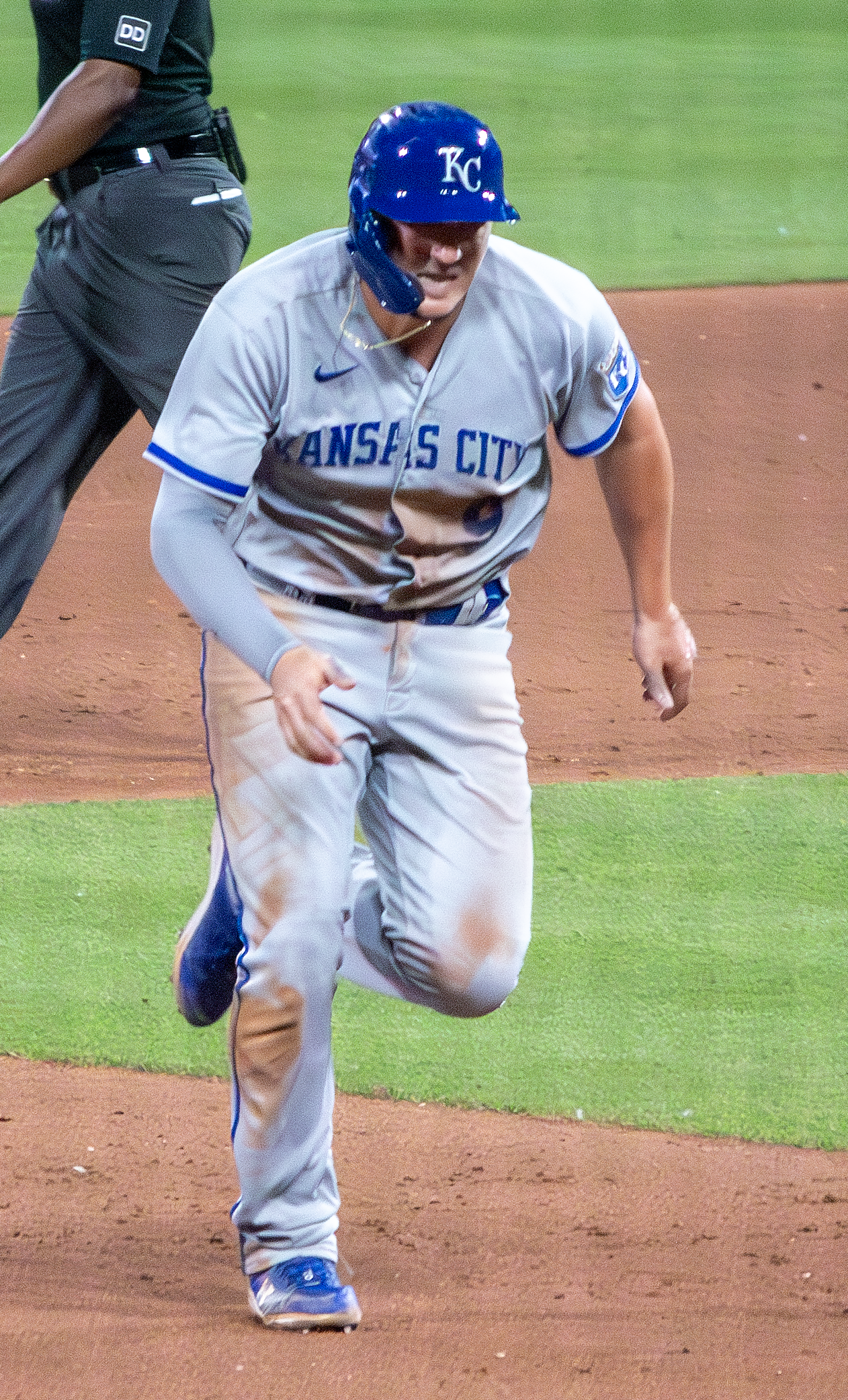
Vinnie Pasquantino darts to third, 2023.

Pasquantino made his professional debut in 2019 with the Rookie-level Burlington Royals, batting .294 with 14 home runs and 53 runs batted in (RBIs) over 57 games. He did not play in 2020 because the season was cancelled due to the COVID-19 pandemic. He started the 2021 season with the Single-A Quad Cities River Bandits before being promoted to the Double-A Northwest Arkansas Naturals. Over 116 games between the two teams, he slashed .300/.394/.563 with 24 home runs, 84 RBIs, and 37 doubles. Pasquantino opened the 2022 season with the Triple-A Omaha Storm Chasers. After the Royals traded first baseman Carlos Santana on June 27, Pasquantino was promoted to the active roster.

=== Major leagues ===
==== 2022 ====
On July 1, 2022, Pasquantino hit a home run off of Detroit Tigers starter Michael Pineda for his first career major league hit. He hit his second career homer on July 11, coincidentally also off of Pineda. He was named the American League Player of the Week for August 8 to 14 when he hit .455 with four home runs and six RBIs in six games.

==== 2023 ====
Pasquantino made the Opening Day roster for Kansas City in 2023. Playing in 61 games, he hit .247/.324/.437 with 9 home runs and 26 RBI. The Royals organization started a continuing tradition of having a team employee dressed in a bigfoot or sasquatch costume walk across the roof of the team hall of fame in left field each time Pasquantino reaches base; Pasquantino was not told by the team of the stunt beforehand, only learning of it when a friend sent him a link to a tweet containing a clip of the event. Pasquantino has embraced it, along with his nickname of "Pasquatch," wearing a gold sasquatch necklace. The Royals have also arranged promotional Pasquatch-themed giveaways such as necklaces and small figurines. On June 14, 2023, it was announced that Pasquantino would undergo season–ending surgery to repair a torn labrum in his right shoulder.

==== 2024 ====
Pasquantino began the 2024 season as the Royals' starting first baseman. During a game versus the Houston Astros on August 29, Pasquantino suffered a broken right thumb when Astros catcher Yainer Diaz ran into his outstretched hand as he attempted to field a throw from pitcher Lucas Erceg. He underwent surgery which ended his regular season. He played in 131 regular season games in 2024, slashing a combined .262/.315/.446 with 19 home runs, and 97 RBIs. By the fall, Pasquantino's injury had healed to the point where the Royals added him to their postseason roster on October 1, for their Wild Card round matchup against the Baltimore Orioles. Playing in two games, he batted .286 with two hits and one RBI, also drawing two walks. With Pasquantino's input, the team introduced the "Pasqwich," an Italian beef sandwich with bacon, hash brown patties, and provolone cheese on a brioche bun with a giardiniera aioli, sold at "Pasquantino's," a themed food cart inside the stadium. The cart continued for the 2025 season.

==== 2025 ====
Pasquantino began the 2025 season as the Royals' starting first baseman. On June 5, 2025, Pasquantino matched a career high with four hits in the first game of a doubleheader at the St. Louis Cardinals. Between June 2–8, he went 13-for-26 with a double, two home runs, and 7 RBI in seven games, being named the American League Player of the Week for that span. Between August 18 and August 22, Pasquantino homered in 5 straight games to match a franchise record, previously done by Mike Sweeney from June 25–29, 2002 and Salvador Perez from August 25–29, 2021. It was the second 5-game HR streak in the Majors this season, following Shohei Ohtani, who did it from July 19-23. Between August 18–24, he went 11-for-29 with two doubles, six home runs, and 12 RBI in seven games, being named the American League Player of the Week for that span. It is his third career American League Player of the Week honor, following June 2–8 this season and August 8–14, 2022. His three such awards are tied with Carlos Beltrán for the 6th most in Royals history, trailing only George Brett (12), Hal McRae (5), Billy Butler (5), Mike Sweeney (4), and Bret Saberhagen (4).

Pasquantino finished the 2025 season batting .264/.323/.475 in 160 games. He recorded 32 home runs and 113 RBI, the latter of which ranked third in the American League.

==== 2026 ====
Prior to the 2026 season, Pasquantino and the Royals front office were unable to come to an agreement on contract terms prior to the January 8, 2026, arbitration deadline. Pasquantino filed for a salary of $4.5 million, while the Royals filed for a salary of $4 million. On January 30, the Royals announced that they signed Pasquantino to a two-year contract worth up to $15.7 million. On June 14, it was announced that Pasquantino would miss roughly four-to-six weeks after undergoing surgery to repair a right hamate bone fracture.

== International career ==
Pasquantino plays for the Italian national baseball team in international competitions. He played in both the 2023 and 2026 editions of the World Baseball Classic. He was named team captain for the 2026 tournament. He initially began the tournament going 0–12. However, in the final game of group play against Mexico, he became the first player in WBC history to hit three home runs in a single game. Italy won the game 9–1, winning the group and qualifying for the quarterfinals. Team Italy went 4–0 in pool play, better than any other European team in the history of the WBC.

== Personal life ==
Pasquantino is of Italian descent. Pasquantino and Ryann Harris announced their engagement in September 2022. Like Pasquantino, Harris attended Old Dominion University, where she played for the women's soccer team. The two married in December 2023.
