= Esteury Ruiz =

Dominican baseball player (born 1999)

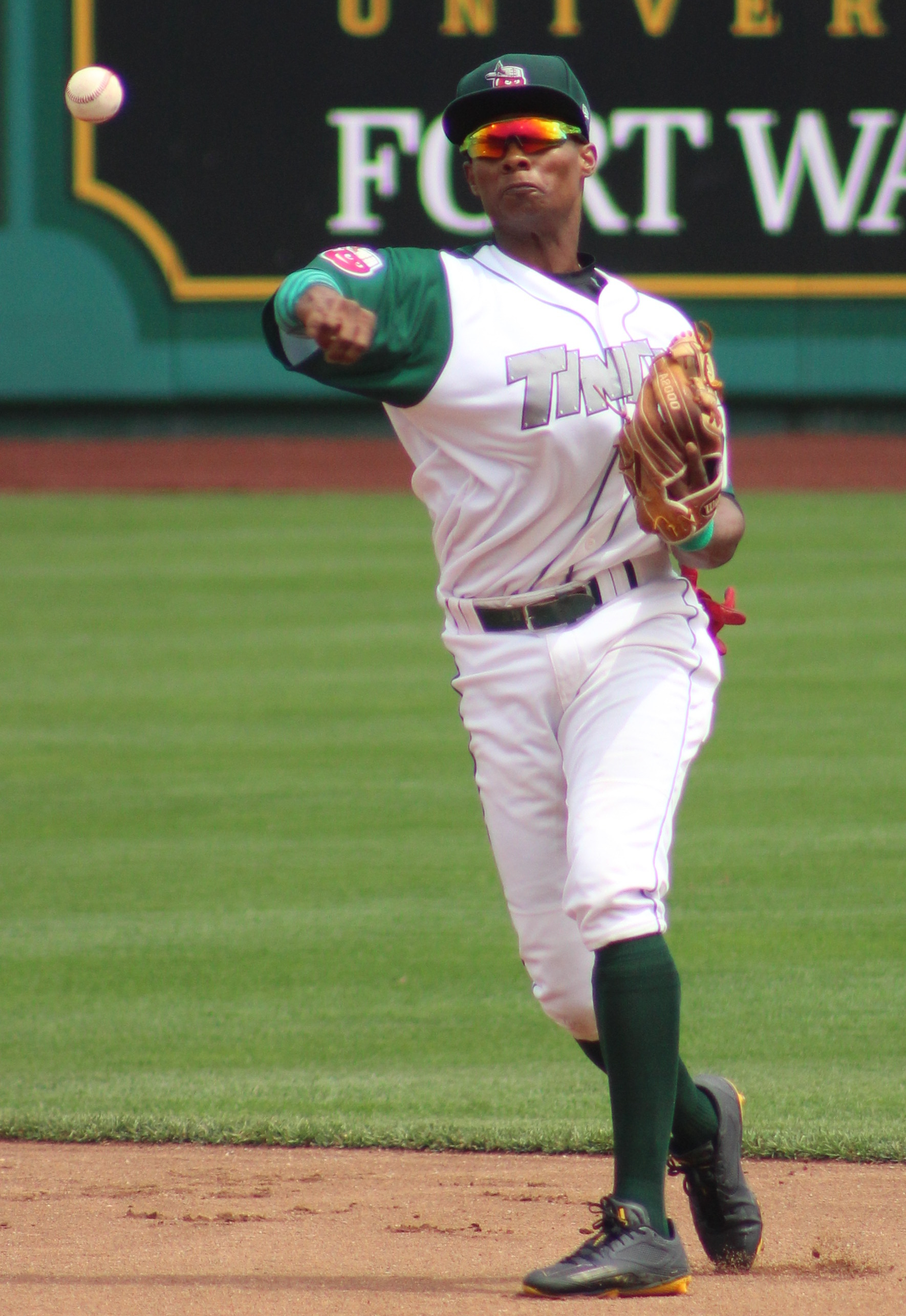
- Ruiz with the Fort Wayne TinCaps in 2018

Miami Marlins – No. 3
- Outfielder
- Born: February 15, 1999 (age 27); Azua, Dominican Republic
- Bats: Right Throws: Right

MLB debut
- July 12, 2022, for the San Diego Padres

MLB statistics (through 2026 season)
- Batting average: .234
- Home runs: 14
- Runs batted in: 76
- Stolen bases: 111
- Stats at Baseball Reference

Teams
- San Diego Padres (2022); Milwaukee Brewers (2022); Oakland Athletics (2023–2024); Los Angeles Dodgers (2025); Miami Marlins (2026–present)

Career highlights and awards
- AL stolen base leader (2023)

Esteury Ruiz Reyes (born February 15, 1999) is a Dominican professional baseball outfielder for the Miami Marlins of Major League Baseball (MLB). He has previously played in MLB for the San Diego Padres, Milwaukee Brewers, Oakland Athletics, and Los Angeles Dodgers. He made his MLB debut in 2022 with the Padres. In 2023, he set the American League record for stolen bases in a rookie season with 67.

== Career ==
=== Kansas City Royals ===
Ruiz signed with the Kansas City Royals as an international free agent on July 3, 2015. He made his professional debut in 2016 with the Dominican Summer League Royals and started 2017 with the rookie–level Arizona League Royals.

=== San Diego Padres ===
On July 24, 2017, the Royals traded Ruiz, Matt Strahm and Travis Wood to the San Diego Padres in exchange for Trevor Cahill, Ryan Buchter and Brandon Maurer. He began his Padres career with the rookie-level Arizona League Padres. He played 2018 with the Single-A Fort Wayne TinCaps and 2019 with the High-A Lake Elsinore Storm. Ruiz did not play in a game in 2020 due to the cancellation of the minor league season because of the COVID-19 pandemic.

Ruiz returned in 2021 to play for the Double-A San Antonio Missions and returned there to start the 2022 season, where he played 84 games with a .249 batting average and 36 stolen bases. On July 12, the Padres selected Ruiz to the major league roster. He made his major league debut that day as the starting center fielder against the Colorado Rockies, and singled in his first MLB at-bat against Austin Gomber. He had two hits in four at-bats in the game with an RBI. In 14 games, he had a .171 average.

=== Milwaukee Brewers ===
On August 1, 2022, the Padres traded Ruiz, Taylor Rogers, Dinelson Lamet,+ and prospect Robert Gasser to the Milwaukee Brewers for Josh Hader. In 2022, he batted .332/.447/.526 in 437 at bats. Ruiz led the minor leagues in stolen bases, with 85, while being caught 14 times, and was third in the minor leagues in times hit by pitch with 27.

=== Oakland Athletics / Athletics ===
On December 12, 2022, the Oakland Athletics acquired Ruiz from the Brewers in a three-team trade in which the Atlanta Braves acquired Sean Murphy, the Brewers acquired William Contreras, Joel Payamps, and Justin Yeager, and the Athletics also acquired Manny Piña, Kyle Muller, Freddy Tarnok, and Royber Salinas.

On March 25, 2023, manager Mark Kotsay announced that Ruiz had made the Opening Day roster. In a July 5 game against the Detroit Tigers, he stole his 43rd base of the season. In doing so, he set the A's rookie record for stolen bases in a season, surpassing the previous record of 42 set by Mitchell Page in 1977. On July 7, the A's placed Ruiz on the 10-day injured list with a shoulder injury. He was the MLB stolen base leader at the time of the injury. In 132 games for Oakland, Ruiz hit .254/.309/.345 with five home runs, 47 RBI, and 67 stolen bases. His stolen base tally set a new AL rookie stolen base record, surpassing Kenny Lofton's 66 steals from 1992.

Ruiz was optioned to the Triple-A Las Vegas Aviators on April 1, 2024 but was recalled on April 15 after J. D. Davis was placed on the injury list. In 29 games for Oakland, he slashed .200/.270/.382 with two home runs, eight RBI, and five stolen bases. He was placed on the injured list with a strained left wrist on May 23 and transferred to the 60-day injured list on September 4, ending his season.

Ruiz was again optioned to Las Vegas to begin the 2025 season and was designated for assignment on March 30 after only two games.

=== Los Angeles Dodgers ===
On April 2, 2025, the Los Angeles Dodgers acquired Ruiz from the Athletics for minor league pitcher Carlos Duran. Ruiz played 66 games for the Triple-A Oklahoma City Comets before he was recalled by the Dodgers on July 3, after Max Muncy was placed on the injured list. With the Dodgers, he played in 19 games, with four hits in 21 at-bats, including one home run, before being optioned back to the minors on August 8. He finished the season with Oklahoma City, where he played in a total of 104 games with a .303 batting average, 16 home runs, 60 RBI and 62 stolen bases.

=== Miami Marlins ===
On December 29, 2025, the Dodgers traded Ruiz to the Miami Marlins for minor league pitcher Adriano Marrero.

== See also ==
- List of Major League Baseball players from the Dominican Republic
