= Connor Thomas =

American baseball player (born 1998)

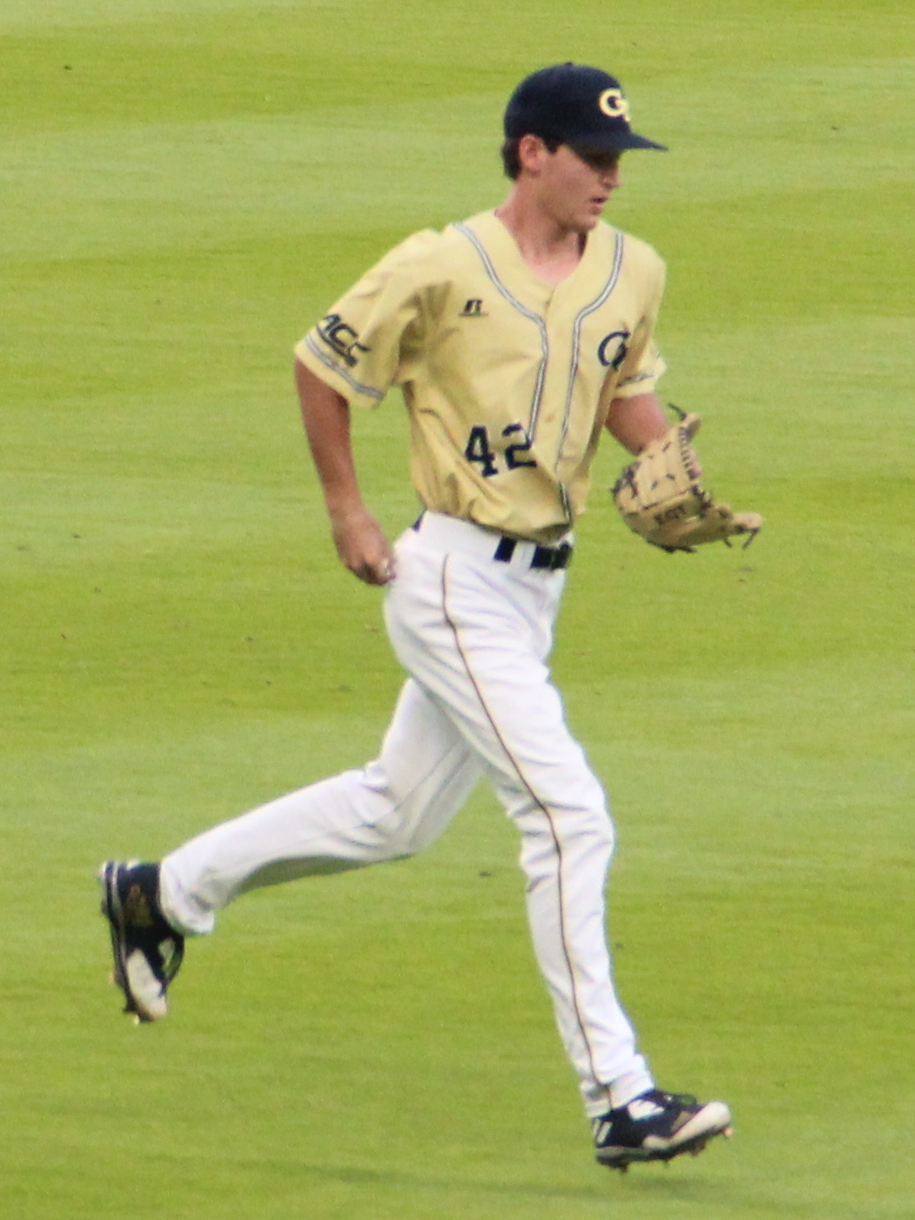
- Thomas with Georgia Tech in 2017

Kansas City Royals – No. 50
- Pitcher
- Born: May 29, 1998 (age 28); Tifton, Georgia, U.S.
- Bats: Left Throws: Left

MLB debut
- March 29, 2025, for the Milwaukee Brewers

MLB statistics (through 2026 season)
- Win–loss record: 2–1
- Earned run average: 9.29
- Strikeouts: 23
- Stats at Baseball Reference

Teams
- Milwaukee Brewers (2025); Atlanta Braves (2026); Kansas City Royals (2026–present)

Sidney Connor Thomas (born May 29, 1998) is an American professional baseball pitcher for the Kansas City Royals of Major League Baseball (MLB). He has previously played in MLB for the Milwaukee Brewers and Atlanta Braves. He made his MLB debut in 2025.

== Amateur career ==
Thomas attended Tift County High School in Tifton, Georgia. As a junior in 2015, he went 8–1 with a 0.67 ERA. Unselected in the 2016 Major League Baseball draft, he enrolled at Georgia Tech where he played college baseball.

In 2017, as a freshman at Georgia Tech, Thomas pitched 10 1/3 innings in which he gave up 13 earned runs. As a sophomore, he moved into the starting rotation, going 7–4 with a 3.34 ERA and 106 strikeouts over 97 innings and fifteen games. In 2019, his junior year, Thomas made 16 starts in which he compiled a 9–2 record and 3.11 ERA over 113 innings.

== Professional career ==
=== St. Louis Cardinals ===
The St. Louis Cardinals drafted Thomas in the fifth round, with the 155th overall selection, of the 2019 Major League Baseball draft. Thomas signed with the Cardinals and made his professional debut with the State College Spikes of the Low-A New York–Penn League before being promoted to the Peoria Chiefs of the Single-A Midwest League in July. Over 43 innings pitched between the two clubs, he went 4–1 with a 3.77 ERA. Thomas did not play in a game in 2020 due to the cancellation of the minor league season because of the COVID-19 pandemic.

To begin the 2021 season, Thomas was assigned to the Springfield Cardinals of the Double-A Central. After compiling a 4.87 ERA over 20 1/3 innings, he was promoted to the Memphis Redbirds of the Triple-A East. Over 22 games (14 starts) with Memphis, Thomas went 6–4 with a 3.10 ERA and 92 strikeouts over 101 2/3 innings. Thomas returned to Memphis for the 2022 season. Over 28 games (25 starts), he posted a 6–12 record with a 5.47 ERA and 110 strikeouts over 135 innings. He was selected to play in the Arizona Fall League (AFL) for the Salt River Rafters after the season. He compiled a 1.75 ERA and 34 strikeouts over 25 2/3 innings and was named the AFL Pitcher of the Year.

On November 15, 2022, the Cardinals selected Thomas' contract and added him to the 40-man roster to protect him from the Rule 5 draft. Thomas was optioned to Memphis to begin the 2023 season. He played the whole season there, appearing in 21 games (17 starts) and going 5–4 with a 5.53 ERA and 69 strikeouts over 94 1/3 innings. Thomas was designated for assignment on November 14, 2023, after multiple prospects were added to the 40-man roster. He cleared waivers and was sent outright to Triple-A on November 16.

Thomas returned to Memphis for the 2024 campaign, posting a 7-4 record and 2.89 ERA with 79 strikeouts and three saves in 90 1/3 innings pitched across 56 appearances.

=== Milwaukee Brewers ===
On December 11, 2024, the Milwaukee Brewers selected Thomas in the Rule 5 draft. On March 22, 2025, the Brewers announced that Thomas had made the team's Opening Day roster. He made two appearances for Milwaukee before being placed on the injured list with left elbow arthritis on April 8. Thomas was transferred to the 60-day injured list on May 18. On July 1, it was announced that Thomas would require surgery to remove loose bodies from his elbow, with Tommy John surgery remaining as a possibility. Thomas was outrighted off the 40-man roster on October 24 and chose to become a free agent rather than accept an assignment to the minor leagues.

=== Atlanta Braves ===
On November 6, 2025, Thomas signed a minor league contract with the Atlanta Braves. He made 15 appearances split between the High-A Rome Emperors and Triple-A Gwinnett Stripers, accumulating a 2–0 record and 1.54 ERA with 29 strikeouts and one save over 35 innings of work. On July 7, 2026, the Braves selected Thomas' contract, adding him to their active roster. In two appearances for Atlanta, he struggled to a 21.32 ERA with four strikeouts over 6 1/3 innings pitched.

=== Kansas City Royals ===
On July 30, 2026, Thomas was claimed off waivers by the Athletics. He was designated for assignment by the Athletics on August 1. On August 4, Thomas was claimed off waivers by the Kansas City Royals. He made 17 relief appearances for the Royals and had a 2–0 record, a 2.33 ERA, and 14 strikeouts across 19 1/3 innings.

== Personal life ==
Thomas married his wife Brett Thomas in 2019, and they have two daughters.

== See also ==
- Rule 5 draft results
