= Tyler Tolbert =

American baseball player (born 1998)

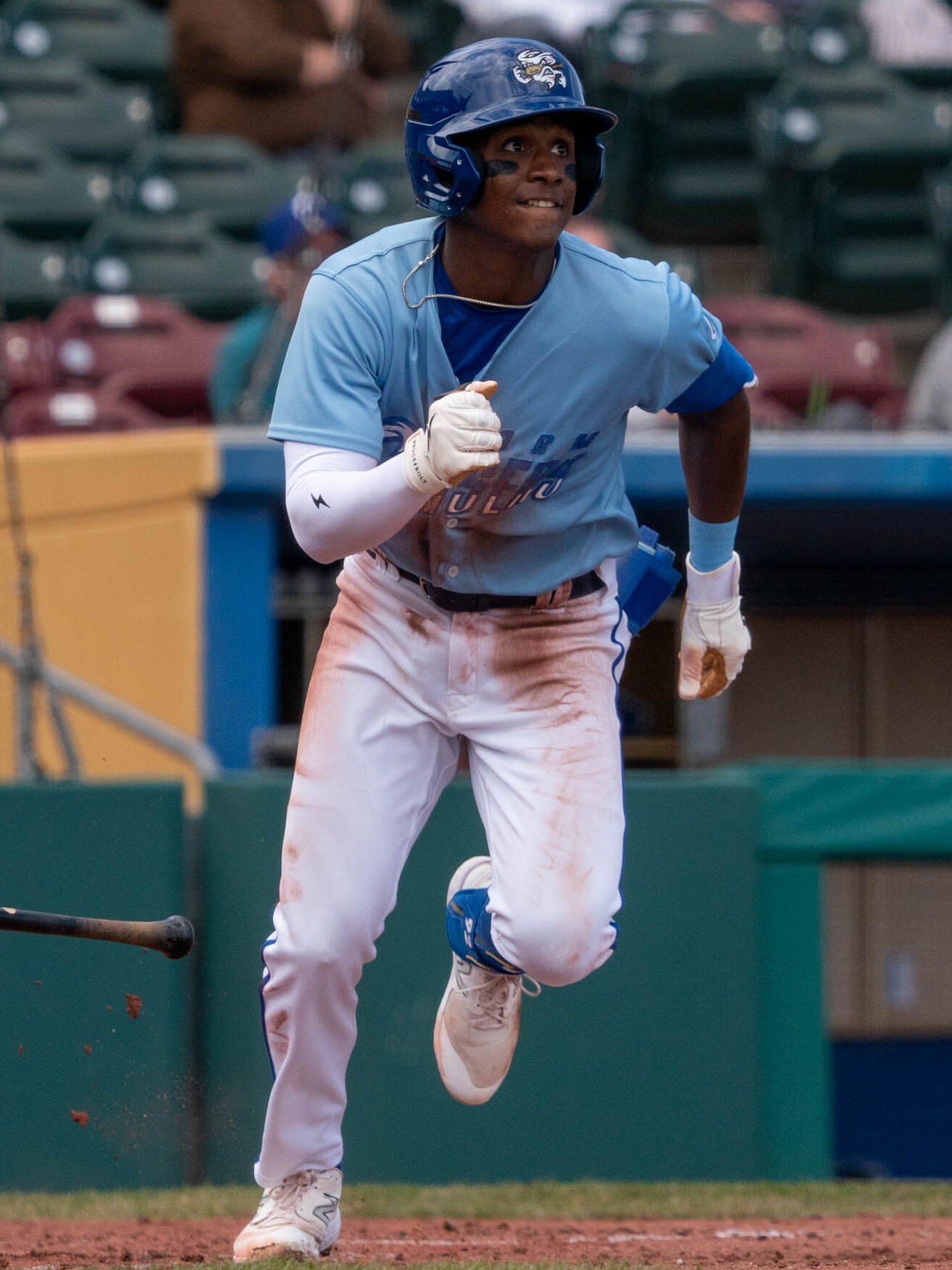
- Tolbert with the Omaha Storm Chasers in 2024

Kansas City Royals – No. 2
- Utility player
- Born: January 27, 1998 (age 28); Birmingham, Alabama, U.S.
- Bats: Right Throws: Right

MLB debut
- March 31, 2025, for the Kansas City Royals

MLB statistics (through 2026 season)
- Batting average: .283
- Home runs: 4
- Runs batted in: 14
- Stolen bases: 43
- Stats at Baseball Reference

Teams
- Kansas City Royals (2025–present)

Tyler Mangual Tolbert (born January 27, 1998) is an American professional baseball utility player for the Kansas City Royals of Major League Baseball (MLB). He made his MLB debut in 2025.

== Early life ==
Tolbert attended Hewitt-Trussville High School in Trussville, Alabama and the University of Alabama at Birmingham (UAB), where he played college baseball for the Blazers. The Kansas City Royals selected him in the 13th round, with the 379th overall pick, of the 2019 Major League Baseball draft.

== Professional career ==
=== Minor leagues ===
Tolbert split his first professional season between the rookie-level Arizona League Royals and Idaho Falls Chukars, hitting .253 with 24 runs batted in (RBIs) and 28 stolen bases over 50 games.

Tolbert did not play in a game in 2020 due to the cancellation of the minor league season because of the COVID-19 pandemic. He returned to action in 2021 with the rookie-level Arizona Complex League Royals, Single-A Columbia Fireflies, and High-A Quad Cities River Bandits. In 89 appearances split between the three affiliates, Tolbert slashed .226/.355/.365 with six home runs, 36 RBI, and 55 stolen bases.

Playing for High-A Quad Cities in 2022, Tolbert stole 60 bases without being caught stealing; he also batted .224/.313/.340 with four home runs and 36 RBI. In 2023, he was named the Royals' George Brett Hitter of the Year after posting a .755 on-base plus slugging for the Double-A Northwest Arkansas Naturals. In 2024, he stole 40 bases for Northwest Arkansas and eight bases for the Triple-A Omaha Storm Chasers, winning the Royals' minor league baserunner of the year award.

=== Major leagues ===
==== 2025 ====
On March 31, 2025, Tolbert was selected to the 40-man roster and promoted to the major leagues for the first time. He made his major league debut that day as a pinch hitter. On April 4, Tolbert stole second base against the Baltimore Orioles, recording the first stolen base of his major league career. He also stole third base. He started his first MLB game on April 16 after appearing as a substitute in 6 games. On April 27, he was placed on the bereavement list, from which he was reinstated three days later. On May 2, he was optioned to Triple-A Omaha after batting 0-for-5 but stealing six bases and scoring two runs for the Royals. On July 23, Tolbert hit his first career home run off of Drew Pomeranz of the Chicago Cubs.

==== 2026 ====
Against the Philadelphia Phillies on July 6, Tolbert had a career-high five hits, which included a home run and an RBI double. The following day, he recorded a hit in his first 5 plate appearances against the New York Mets, the last of which tied an MLB record (set by Walt Dropo in 1952) for most consecutive plate appearances with a base hit at 12. The streak ended with a flyout in the top of the 9th.

== Personal life ==
Tolbert's parents are Bernardo and Sherrye Tolbert. He has one sister, Taylor, who also has a career in sports. His cousin is professional football quarterback Joshua Dobbs. Another cousin, Stephen Dobbs, also played college baseball at UAB. Another cousin, Parker Washington, is a professional wide receiver. Washington's sister, Ashton Washington, is a scout for the Chicago Bears.
