= Matthew Lugo =

American baseball player (born 2001)

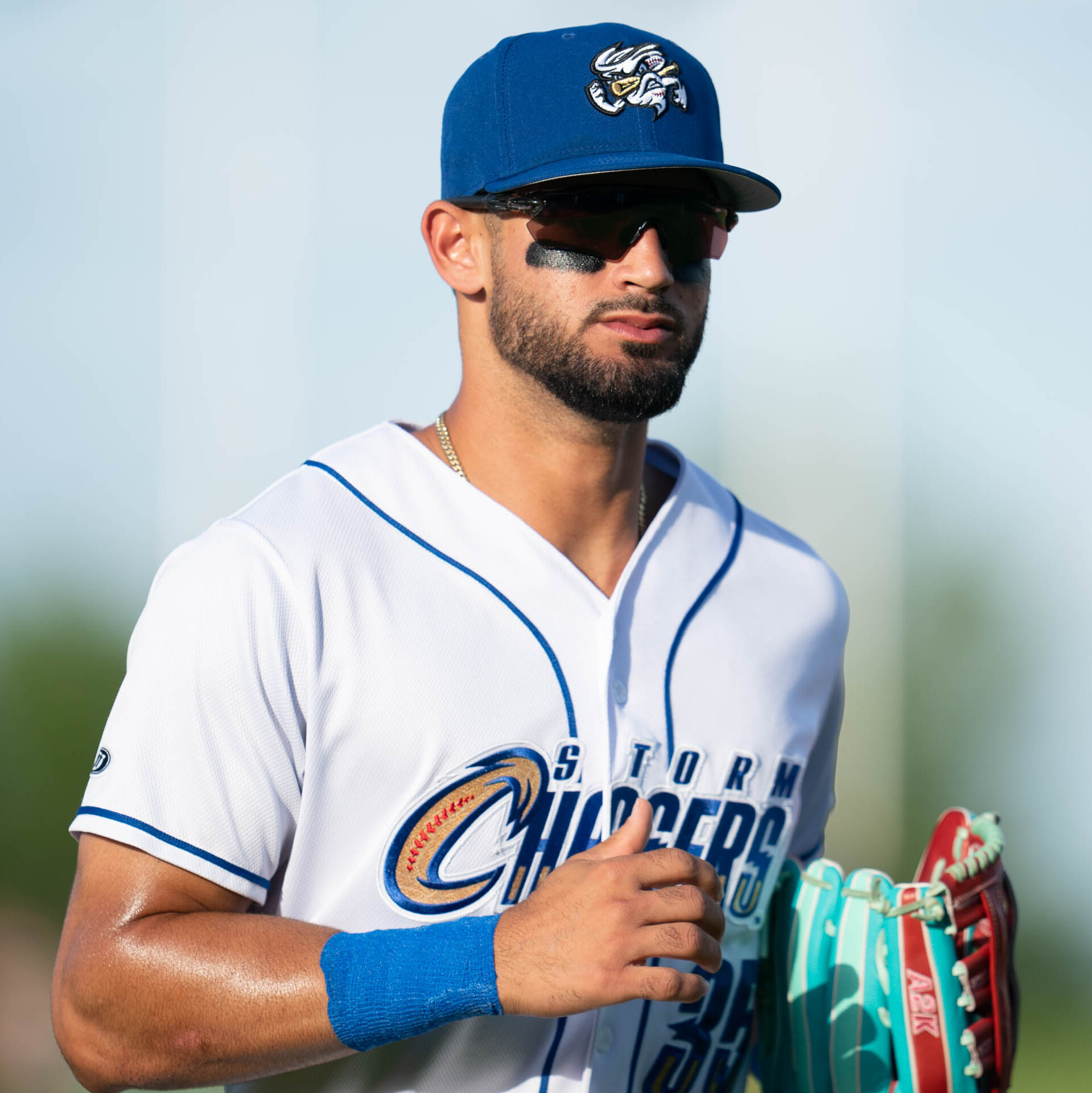
- Lugo with the Omaha Storm Chasers in 2026

Kansas City Royals – No. 24
- Outfielder
- Born: May 9, 2001 (age 25); Manatí, Puerto Rico
- Bats: Right Throws: Right

MLB debut
- May 9, 2025, for the Los Angeles Angels

MLB statistics (through 2026 season)
- Batting average: .217
- Home runs: 4
- Runs batted in: 9
- Stats at Baseball Reference

Teams
- Los Angeles Angels (2025); Kansas City Royals (2026–present)

Matthew Jabel Lugo (born May 9, 2001) is a Puerto Rican professional baseball outfielder for the Kansas City Royals of Major League Baseball (MLB). He has previously played in MLB for the Los Angeles Angels.

== Career ==
=== Boston Red Sox ===
After Lugo's junior year in high school, he was selected to play in the 2018 Perfect Game All-American Classic. He was committed to the University of Miami and was the highest-ranked Puerto Rican prospect (No. 38) in the 2019 MLB draft. In the draft, the Boston Red Sox selected Lugo in the second round.

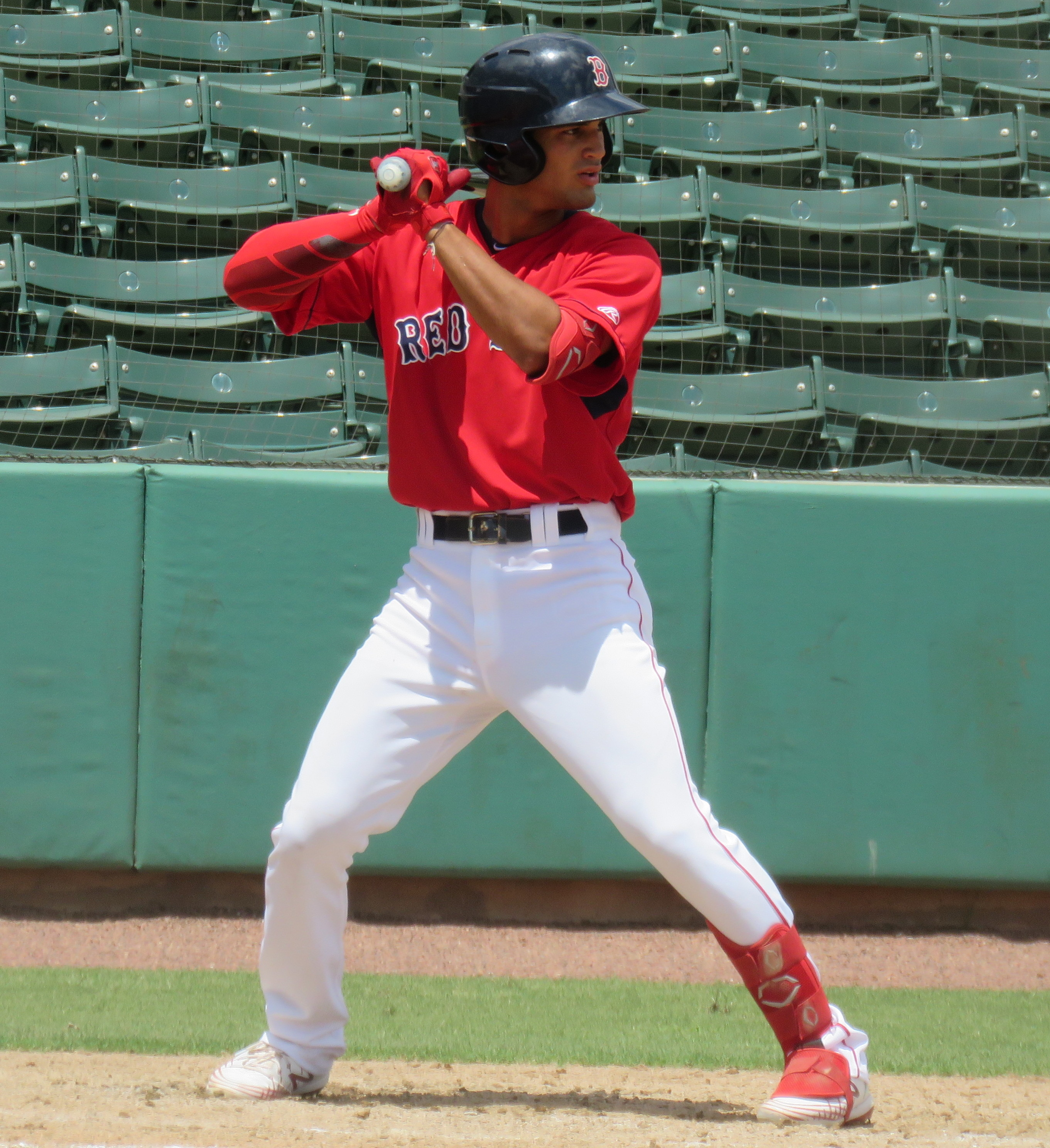
Lugo with the Gulf Coast League Red Sox in 2019

After getting drafted and forgoing a college career, Lugo was assigned to the Gulf Coast League Red Sox, where he played 39 games and slashed .257/.342/.331 with one home run. In the offseason, Lugo played in the Puerto Rican Winter League for Atenienses de Manatí. After the 2020 minor league season was cancelled due to the COVID-19 pandemic, Lugo was invited to participate in the Red Sox' fall instructional league. Lugo spent the 2021 season in Low-A with the Salem Red Sox, batting .270 with four home runs and 50 RBI in 105 games.

Lugo spent most of 2022 in High-A with the Greenville Drive, and also played in three Double-A games with the Portland Sea Dogs. For the season, he batted a combined .282 with 18 home runs and 79 RBI. During the 2022–23 offseason, he played in the Puerto Rican Winter League for Criollos de Caguas. Lugo returned to Portland for the 2023 season, batting .242 with five home runs and 37 RBI in 83 games. Through 2022, Lugo played as an infielder, primary at shortstop. During 2023, he played both as an infielder an outfielder. After 2023, he has only played as an outfielder.

Lugo began the 2024 season with the Triple-A Worcester Red Sox, where he batted .250/.340/.452 with five home runs, 19 RBI, and seven stolen bases across 35 appearances.

=== Los Angeles Angels ===
On July 30, 2024, Lugo, Niko Kavadas, Yeferson Vargas, and Ryan Zeferjahn were traded to the Los Angeles Angels in exchange for Luis García. He made one appearance for the Triple–A Salt Lake Bees, going 2–for–5 with a three–run home run. Following the season, the Angels added Lugo to their 40-man roster to protect him from the Rule 5 draft.

Lugo was optioned to Triple-A Salt Lake to begin the 2025 season. On May 9, 2025, Lugo was selected to the 40-man roster and promoted to the major leagues for the first time. On May 11, Lugo hit his first career home run, a pinch-hit, solo shot off of Félix Bautista of the Baltimore Orioles. He made 31 appearances for Los Angeles during his rookie campaign, batting .232/.243/.464 with four home runs and nine RBI.

Lugo was again optioned to Triple-A Salt Lake to begin the 2026 season. He made 47 appearances split between the Double-A Rocket City Trash Pandas and Salt Lake, batting a cumulative .257/.388/.389 with three home runs, 29 RBI, and 11 stolen bases. On May 27, 2026, Lugo was designated for assignment by the Angels.

=== Kansas City Royals ===
On June 2, 2026, Lugo was claimed off of waivers by the Kansas City Royals.

== Personal life ==
Lugo is the nephew of former MLB player Carlos Beltrán.
