= Matt Strahm =

American baseball player (born 1991)

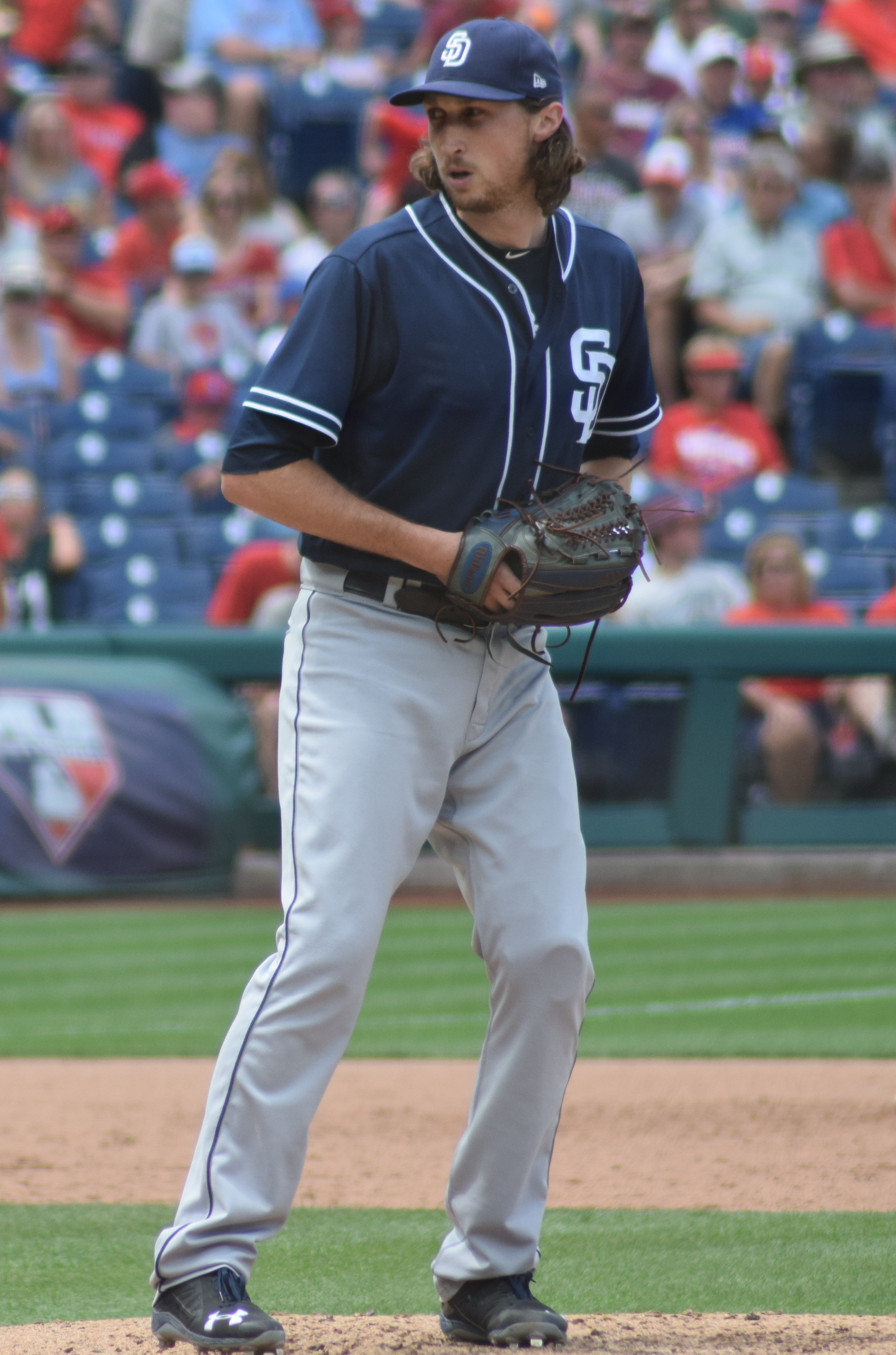
- Strahm with the San Diego Padres in 2018

Free agent
- Pitcher
- Born: November 12, 1991 (age 35); West Fargo, North Dakota, U.S.
- Bats: Right Throws: Left

MLB debut
- July 31, 2016, for the Kansas City Royals

MLB statistics (through August 1, 2026)
- Win–loss record: 37–42
- Earned run average: 3.61
- Strikeouts: 612
- Stats at Baseball Reference

Teams
- Kansas City Royals (2016–2017); San Diego Padres (2018–2021); Boston Red Sox (2022); Philadelphia Phillies (2023–2025); Kansas City Royals (2026)

Career highlights and awards
- All-Star (2024)

Matthew Scott Strahm (/strɑːm/; born November 12, 1991) is an American professional baseball pitcher who is a free agent. He has previously played in Major League Baseball (MLB) for the San Diego Padres, Boston Red Sox, Philadelphia Phillies, and Kansas City Royals.

== Career ==
=== Amateur career ===
Strahm attended West Fargo High School in West Fargo, North Dakota. He played for the school's baseball team as a pitcher, considering himself to be the third-best pitcher on his team. Attending a tryout at the University of Kansas, Strahm caught the attention of a coach from the college baseball team of Neosho County Community College. In summer 2011, he played for the Rochester Honkers of the Northwoods League. In 2012, he pitched to a 9–3 win–loss record and a 1.48 earned run average (ERA), helping the Neosho County Panthers reach the 2012 National Junior College Athletic Association World Series. After two seasons with Neosho, Strahm committed to transfer to the University of Nebraska–Lincoln.

=== Kansas City Royals ===
The Kansas City Royals selected Strahm in the 21st round, with the 643rd overall selection, of the 2012 MLB draft. He signed with the Royals, receiving a $100,000 signing bonus, rather than transfer to Nebraska. Strahm made his professional debut with the Idaho Falls Chukars of the Rookie-level Pioneer League. Strahm required Tommy John surgery during the 2013 season to repair damage to the ulnar collateral ligament in his left elbow. He missed most of the 2014 season, throwing only 19 1/3 innings for Idaho Falls. In 2015, Strahm pitched for the Lexington Legends of the Class A South Atlantic League (SAL) and Wilmington Blue Rocks of the Class A-Advanced Carolina League. He was named a SAL All-Star. Between the two teams, Strahm recorded 121 strikeouts in 94 innings pitched. The Royals added him to their 40-man roster after the 2015 season to protect him from the Rule 5 draft. Strahm began the 2016 season with the Northwest Arkansas Naturals of the Class AA Texas League. He had a 3.43 ERA and 107 strikeouts in 102 1/3 innings pitched through the end of July.

When Wade Davis went on the disabled list, the Royals promoted Strahm to the major leagues on July 31, 2016. He made his MLB debut that day. Though most of his minor league experience was as a starting pitcher, the Royals deployed Strahm as a relief pitcher for the remainder of the 2016 season in order to not increase the number of innings thrown from the 2015 season by too many.

At the end of the 2016 season, the Royals indicated that Strahm would compete for a spot in their starting rotation during spring training in 2017. However, after acquiring Nate Karns, Travis Wood, and Jason Hammel, Ned Yost, the Royals' manager, announced at the start of spring training that Strahm would be a reliever in 2017. Strahm made 24 appearances, including three starts for the Royals in 2017 before being shut down for the season with a torn patellar tendon in his left knee.

Overall during parts of two seasons with the Royals, Strahm compiled a 4–7 record in 45 games (3 starts) with a 3.81 ERA while striking out 67 batters in 56 2/3 innings.

=== San Diego Padres ===
On July 24, 2017, the Royals traded Strahm, Travis Wood, and Esteury Ruiz to the San Diego Padres for Trevor Cahill, Ryan Buchter, and Brandon Maurer. In 2018, he posted an ERA of 2.05 in 41 games (5 starts). He had 69 strikeouts in 61 1/3 innings. Strahm began the 2019 season as a starter, he started 16 games before being moved to the bullpen. Overall, Strahm finished with a record of 6–11 in 46 games, he struck out 118 in 114 2/3 innings. The following season, Strahm pitched mainly out of the bullpen, appearing in 19 games in 20 2/3 innings.

On April 17, 2021, Strahm was placed on the 60-day injured list as he continued to recover from patellar tendon surgery on his right knee that he underwent in October 2020. On November 30, Strahm was non-tendered by the Padres, making him a free agent.

Overall during parts of four seasons with the Padres, Strahm compiled a 9–17 record in 112 games (22 starts) with a 3.81 ERA while striking out 206 batters in 203 1/3 innings.

=== Boston Red Sox ===
On March 15, 2022, Strahm signed a one-year contract with the Boston Red Sox. He began the season as a member of Boston's bullpen. Strahm was placed on the COVID-related list on May 30, and reactivated on June 1. He was placed on the injured list on July 15, due to a left wrist contusion suffered in a game against the Tampa Bay Rays on July 12. He rejoined the team on August 19. In 50 relief appearances with Boston during 2022, Strahm posted a 4–4 record with four saves and a 3.83 ERA while striking out 52 batters in 44 2/3 innings.

In early November 2022, Strahm elected to become a free agent.

=== Philadelphia Phillies ===
On December 9, 2022, Strahm signed a two-year contract worth $15 million with the Philadelphia Phillies. On May 6, 2023, Strahm was ejected from a game and fined for not leaving the field after the conclusion of the national anthem despite an umpire's warning. Boston Red Sox pitcher Kutter Crawford was also ejected. Both Strahm and Crawford were taking part in an "anthem standoff" where players compete to leave the field last. The ejection and subsequent fine was largely due to the introduction of the pitch clock, intended to speed up the game and prevent unnecessary delays. After the game, Strahm told reporters that the standoff was "embarrassing" and "...probably not the wisest decision I’ve made in my big-league career." In 56 games for the Phillies in 2023, he went 9–5 with a 3.29 ERA and 108 strikeouts across 87 2/3 innings pitched.

On March 24, 2024, Strahm and the Phillies agreed to a one–year contract extension that includes a vesting option for the 2026 season. He made 66 appearances out of the bullpen for Philadelphia, compiling a 6–2 record and 1.87 ERA with 79 strikeouts and three saves across 62 2/3 innings pitched.

Strahm made 66 relief appearances for the Phillies during the 2025 season, registering a 2–3 record and 2.74 ERA with 70 strikeouts and six saves across 62 1/3 innings pitched.

=== Kansas City Royals (second stint) ===
On December 19, 2025, Strahm was traded to the Kansas City Royals in exchange for Jonathan Bowlan. After posting a 7.32 ERA and 3–4 win–loss record with four blown saves through 41 games and 35 2/3 innings pitched for the Royals, Strahm was designated for assignment on August 4, 2026. He cleared waivers and was released on August 8.

On September 13, 2026, it was announced that Strahm had undergone surgery on his right knee.

== Personal life ==
Strahm grew up a Minnesota Twins fan. He and his wife, Megan, who also attended Neosho County Community College, were married in Chanute, Kansas, in September 2015. His brother, Ben, played college baseball at Cowley Community College and was signed by the San Francisco Giants in 2018. He also has a sister, Britta. Strahm has his own YouTube channel, depicting his baseball life and featuring him opening packs of baseball cards.

As of the 2026 MLB season, Strahm is the only active MLB player born in North Dakota.
