= Kris Bubic =

American baseball player (born 1997)

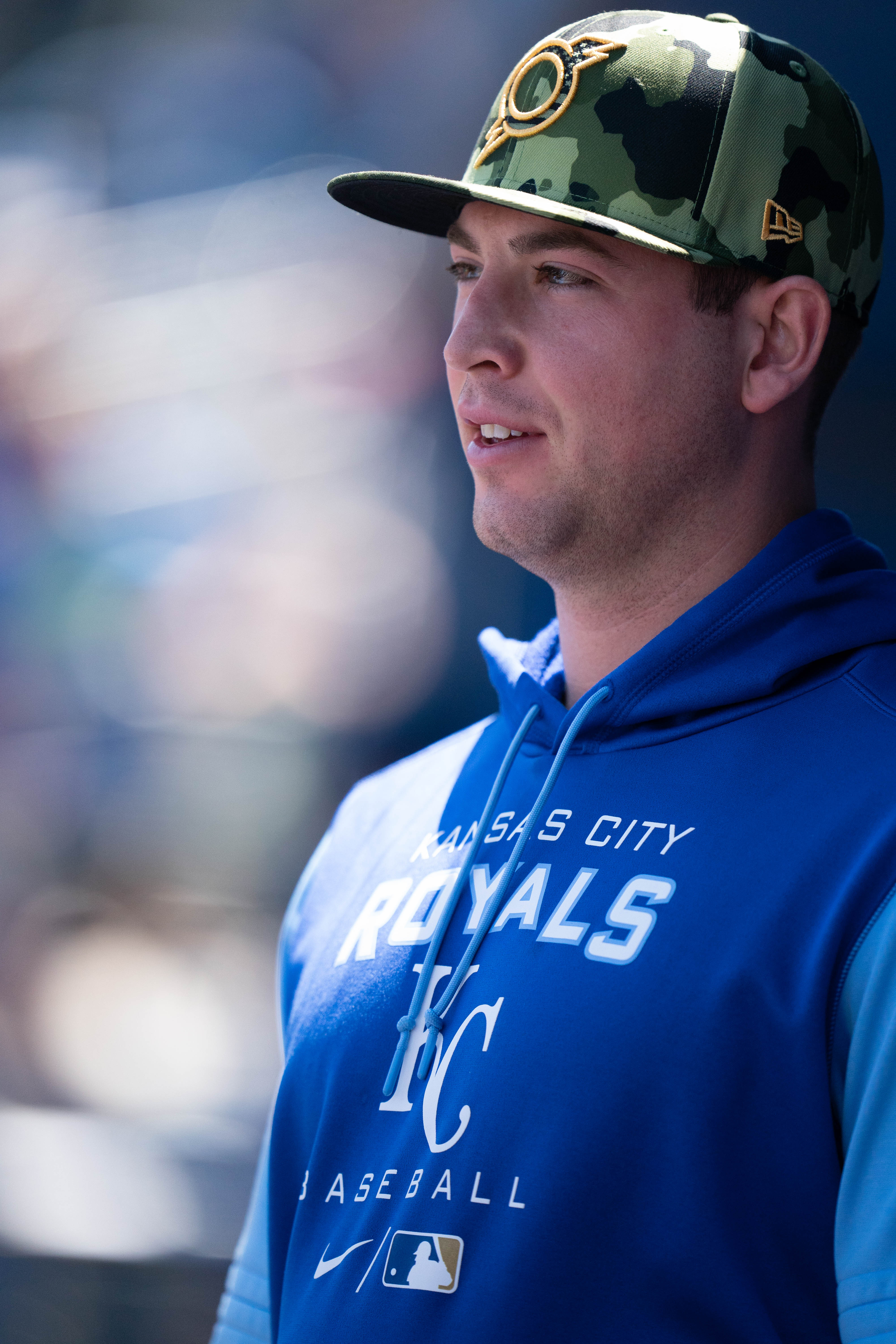
- Bubic at Werner Park in 2022

Free agent
- Pitcher
- Born: August 19, 1997 (age 29); Cupertino, California, U.S.
- Bats: Left Throws: Left

MLB debut
- July 31, 2020, for the Kansas City Royals

MLB statistics (through 2026 season)
- Win–loss record: 23–38
- Earned run average: 4.10
- Strikeouts: 500
- Stats at Baseball Reference

Teams
- Kansas City Royals (2020–2026); Los Angeles Dodgers (2026)

Career highlights and awards
- All-Star (2025)

Kristofer Bubic (born August 19, 1997) is an American professional baseball pitcher who is a free agent. He has previously played in Major League Baseball (MLB) for the Kansas City Royals and Los Angeles Dodgers. He made his MLB debut with the Royals in 2020 and was an All-Star in 2025.

== Early and personal life ==
Bubic was born on August 19, 1997, in Cupertino, California. Bubic is of Croatian descent through both of his parents.

== Amateur career ==
Bubic attended Archbishop Mitty High School in San Jose, California, where he played football and baseball, and he graduated in 2015. As a junior, he was 8–2 with a 0.89 ERA, and as a senior, he compiled a 1.20 ERA and struck out 82 batters in 70 innings pitched. He was not drafted out of high school in the 2015 Major League Baseball draft and he enrolled at Stanford University where he played college baseball for the Stanford Cardinal.

As a freshman at Stanford in 2016, Bubic was 0–3 with a 3.26 ERA in 21 games (six starts). In 2017, as a sophomore, he started 15 games and posted a 7–6 record and 2.79 ERA with 96 strikeouts in 90 innings. After the season, he played in the Cape Cod Baseball League for the Yarmouth–Dennis Red Sox, earning Pitcher of the Year honors after going 4–1 with a 1.65 ERA in 32 2/3 innings. As a junior in 2018, he went 8–1 with a 2.62 ERA and was named to the Pac-12 All-Conference Team.

== Professional career ==
=== Kansas City Royals ===
Bubic was drafted 40th overall by the Kansas City Royals in the 2018 Major League Baseball draft and he signed with the Royals on June 18 for $1,597,500. Bubic was the last of the Royals' four 2018 first-round draft picks, all of whom were college pitchers; the others were Brady Singer (18th overall), Jackson Kowar (33rd overall), and Daniel Lynch IV (34th overall). He made his professional debut with the Idaho Falls Chukars where he was named a Pioneer League All-Star. In ten starts for Idaho Falls, Bubic posted a 2–3 record with a 4.03 ERA. Bubic began 2019 with the Lexington Legends. After pitching to a 4–1 record with a 2.08 ERA in nine starts, he was promoted to the Wilmington Blue Rocks. Over 17 starts with Wilmington, he went 7–4 with a 2.30 ERA. Bubic was named to the 2019 All-Star Futures Game.

Bubic made his major league debut on July 31, 2020, against the Chicago White Sox, pitching four innings while allowing three earned runs and striking out three. With the 2020 Kansas City Royals, Bubic made ten starts, compiling a 1–6 record with 4.32 ERA and 49 strikeouts over fifty innings pitched. In 2021, he was 6–7 with an ERA of 4.43.

In 2022 Bubic finished 3–13 with an ERA of 5.58 in 129 innings, as he had the worst OBP-against among major league pitchers, at .381, the highest WHIP (1.70), gave up the highest percentage of line drives (25.8%), and gave up the most walks per nine innings among major league pitchers (4.4).

Bubic began the 2023 season pitching in the Royals' rotation. In three starts for the team, Bubic logged a record of 0-2 and 3.94 ERA with 16 strikeouts in 16 innings pitched. On April 21, 2023, it was announced that Bubic would undergo Tommy John surgery, prematurely ending his season.

Bubic was activated from the injured list and reinstated to the active roster on July 6, 2024. With the 2024 Kansas City Royals, Bubic compiled a 1–1 record with 2.67 ERA and 39 strikeouts over 30 1/3 innings pitched in 27 games. He also logged seven holds and one save as a member of the bullpen.

On July 6, 2025, Bubic was named to the 2025 All-Star Game roster, his first career selection. In 20 starts for Kansas City, he compiled an 8–7 record and 2.55 ERA with 116 strikeouts across 116 1/3 innings of work. After Bubic pitched 2 2/3 innings against the Cleveland Guardians on July 26, the Royals disclosed that he would miss the remainder of the season with a rotator cuff strain.

Bubic began the 2026 season as a part of Kansas City's rotation, logging a 3–2 record and 4.11 ERA with 51 strikeouts over his first nine starts. On May 18, 2026, Bubic was placed on the injured list due to left elbow soreness. While on rehab assignment with Triple–A Omaha, he was shut down due to shoulder soreness. Bubic was transferred to the 60–day injured list on July 1.

=== Los Angeles Dodgers ===
On August 3, 2026, the Royals traded Bubic to the Los Angeles Dodgers in exchange for Carlos Durán. He did not join the Dodgers until September 16 after recovering from his injury. Bubic pitched 4 2/3 scoreless innings out of the Dodgers' bullpen in five games while allowing only four hits.

Awards and achievements
Preceded by Max Fried	American League Pitcher of the Month; May 2025	Succeeded by Hunter Brown
