= Luinder Avila =

Venezuelan baseball player (born 2001)

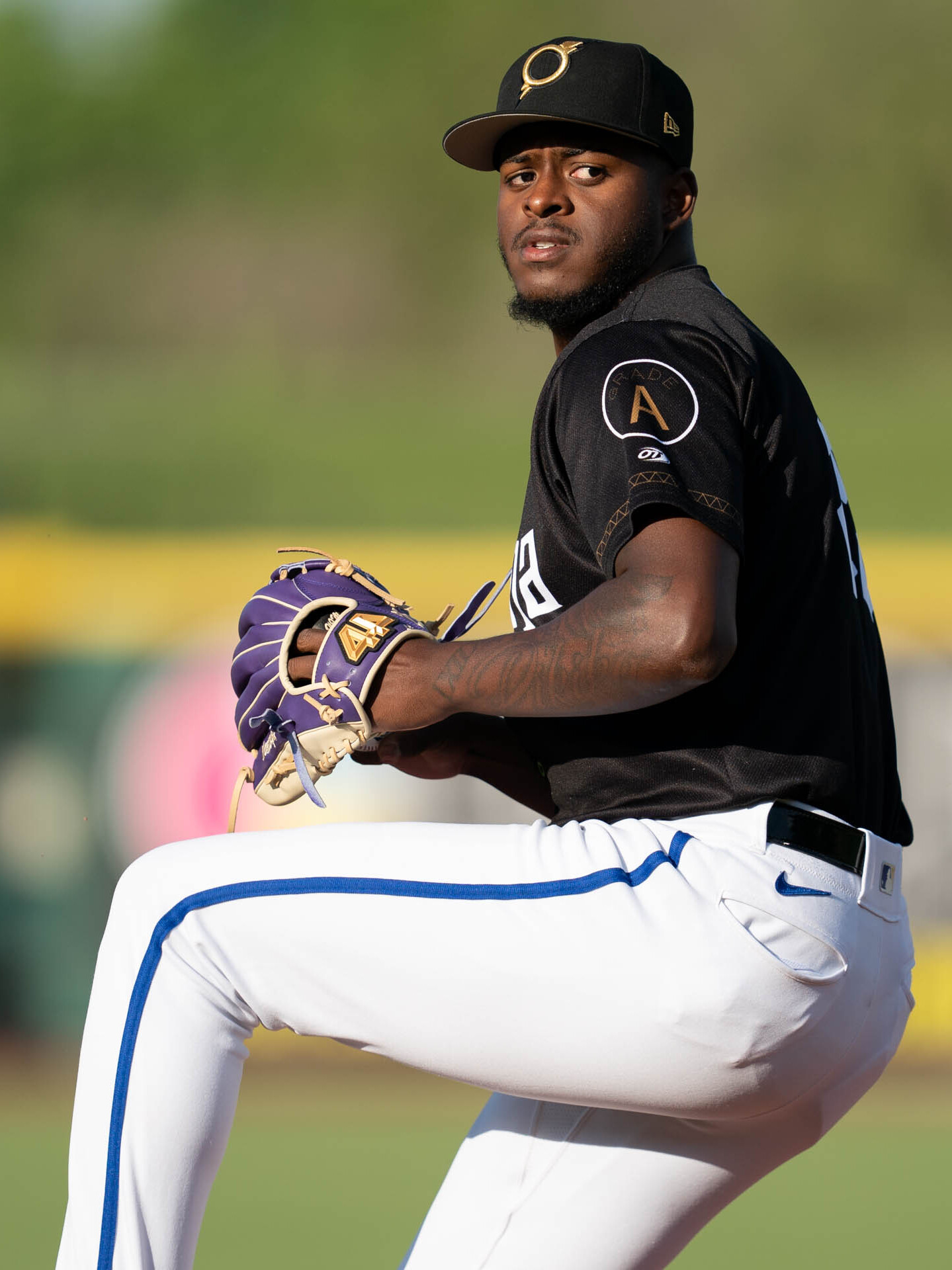
- Avila with the Omaha Storm Chasers in 2025

Kansas City Royals – No. 58
- Pitcher
- Born: August 21, 2001 (age 25); Caracas, Venezuela
- Bats: Right Throws: Right

MLB debut
- August 13, 2025, for the Kansas City Royals

MLB statistics (through 2026 season)
- Win–loss record: 6–5
- Earned run average: 4.82
- Strikeouts: 77
- Stats at Baseball Reference

Teams
- Kansas City Royals (2025–present)
Medals
Men's baseball
Representing Venezuela
World Baseball Classic
Gold medal – first place	2026 Miami	Team

Luinder Gabriel Avila (born August 21, 2001) is a Venezuelan professional baseball pitcher for the Kansas City Royals of Major League Baseball (MLB). He made his MLB debut in 2025.

== Professional career ==
On March 3, 2018, Avila signed with the Kansas City Royals as an international free agent. He made his professional debut with the Dominican Summer League Royals. Avila returned to the DSL Royals in 2019, recording a 6.41 ERA and 22 strikeouts over 12 appearances. He did not play in a game in 2020 due to the cancellation of the minor league season because of the COVID-19 pandemic.

Avila returned to action in 2021 with the rookie–level Arizona League Royals and Single–A Columbia Fireflies. In 14 games (10 starts) for the two affiliates, he compiled a 3–6 record and 4.66 ERA with 51 strikeouts across 58 innings pitched. Avila returned to Columbia in 2022, making 26 starts and registering a 6–10 record and 4.54 ERA with 97 strikeouts across 115 innings of work. He spent the 2023 campaign with the High–A Quad Cities River Bandits, logging a 4–7 record and 4.39 ERA with 102 strikeouts in 108 2/3 innings pitched across 22 games (20 starts).

In 2024, Avila made 20 starts split between the Double–A Northwest Arkansas Naturals and Triple–A Omaha Storm Chasers, compiling a 6–5 record and 4.14 ERA with 85 strikeouts across 87 innings of work. Following the season, the Royals added Avila to their 40-man roster to protect him from the Rule 5 draft.

Avila was optioned to Triple-A Omaha to begin the 2025 season, where he logged a 2–2 record and 4.67 ERA with 51 strikeouts in 44 1/3 innings pitched across 10 games (nine starts). On August 11, 2025, Avila was promoted to the major leagues for the first time. On September 10, Avila recorded his first career win, tossing two scoreless innings against the Cleveland Guardians. He made 13 appearances for Kansas City during his rookie campaign, posting a 1-1 record and 1.29 ERA with 16 strikeouts over 14 innings of work.

Avila was optioned to Triple-A Omaha to begin the 2026 season. He made 21 appearances (including 12 starts) for the Royals, compiling a 5–4 record and 5.53 ERA with 61 strikeouts across 70 innings pitched. On August 5, 2026, Avila underwent Tommy John surgery, ruling him out for the remainder of the season.
