= Carlos Durán (baseball) =

Dominican baseball player (born 2001)

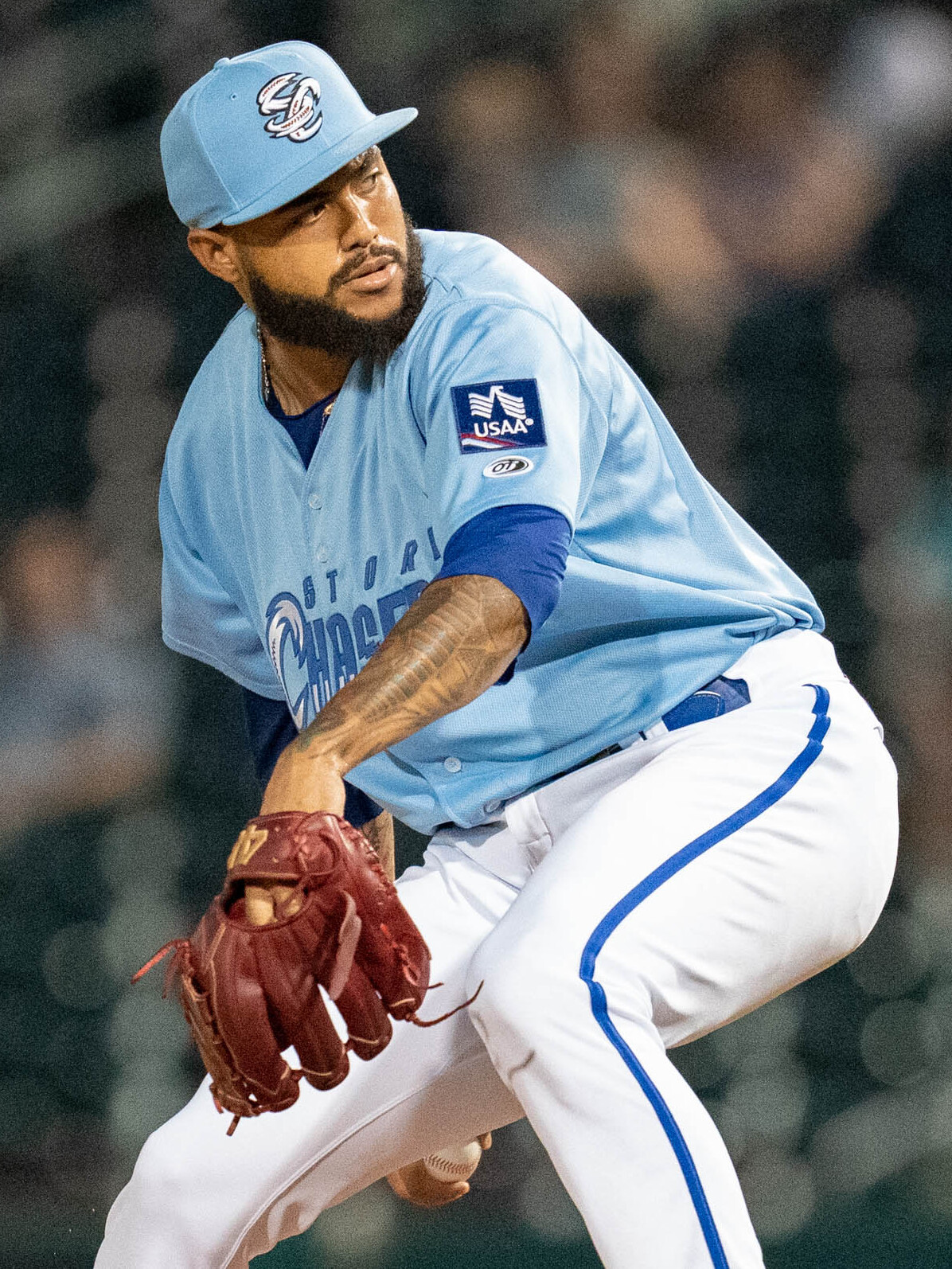
- Durán with the Omaha Storm Chasers in 2026

Kansas City Royals – No. 45
- Pitcher
- Born: July 30, 2001 (age 25); Nagua, Dominican Republic
- Bats: Right Throws: Right

MLB debut
- May 22, 2025, for the Athletics

MLB statistics (through 2026 season)
- Win–loss record: 1–0
- Earned run average: 27.00
- Strikeouts: 1
- Stats at Baseball Reference

Teams
- Athletics (2025); Kansas City Royals (2026–present)

Carlos Daniel Durán (born July 30, 2001) is a Dominican professional baseball pitcher for the Kansas City Royals of Major League Baseball (MLB). He made his MLB debut in 2025 with the Athletics. Durán originally signed with the Los Angeles Dodgers, who traded him to the Athletics in early 2025. He returned to the Dodgers organization following that season.

== Career ==
=== Los Angeles Dodgers ===
Durán signed with the Los Angeles Dodgers on March 8, 2018, as an international free agent. He spent the 2018 and 2019 seasons playing for the Dodgers affiliates in the Dominican Summer League (DSL), making 17 starts with a 1.14 ERA and earning DSL mid-season All-Star honors in 2018. Durán did not play in a game in 2020 due to the cancellation of the minor league season because of the COVID-19 pandemic.

Durán was assigned to the Class-A Rancho Cucamonga Quakes in 2021, where he was regarded as being the most prominent pitcher on the Quakes staff. However, he struggled a bit in his first season in the United States, with a 6.11 ERA in 20 appearances (18 starts) for the Quakes and allowed seven earned runs in only 7 1/3 innings for the High-A Great Lakes Loons following a September 1 promotion. In 2022, with Great Lakes, he made 13 starts (and one relief appearance), with a 4.25 ERA and struck out 68 batters in only 48 2/3 innings. His season ended early due to an elbow injury and he underwent Tommy John surgery, which cost him all of the 2023 season.

Returning from the surgery in 2024, Durán began with Rancho Cucamonga (seven runs in 13 2/3 innings), before a July promotion to the Double-A Tulsa Drillers. He made 11 starts for the Drillers, allowing 13 runs in 38 1/3 innings for a 3.05 ERA. He also made one fill-in start for the Triple-A Oklahoma City Baseball Club on September 14, where he allowed two runs in only 1 1/3 innings. Durán did not allow a hit but walked three and struck out three in the game.

=== Oakland Athletics ===
On April 2, 2025, Durán was traded to the Athletics in exchange for Esteury Ruiz. On April 30, he was selected to the 40-man roster and promoted to the major leagues for the first time. Durán was optioned back to the Triple-A Las Vegas Aviators two days later without making an appearance and became a phantom ballplayer. On May 22, he was promoted to the major leagues for a second time and made his MLB debut, allowing three runs on three walks and one hit, recording one out. He was optioned back to Triple-A Las Vegas the following day. Durán was designated for assignment following the acquisition of Austin Wynns on June 8. He cleared waivers and was sent outright to Triple-A on June 11. Durán elected free agency following the season on November 6.

=== Los Angeles Dodgers (second stint) ===
On December 12, 2025, Durán signed a minor league contract with the Los Angeles Dodgers He was assigned to the Triple–A Oklahoma City Comets to begin the 2026 season. On July 6, 2026, the Dodgers added Durán to their 40-man roster and optioned him back to Oklahoma City. He made 37 appearances (including two starts) for the Comets, compiling a 3–2 record and 3.38 ERA with 61 strikeouts and two saves across 42 2/3 innings pitched.

=== Kansas City Royals ===
On August 3, 2026, Durán was traded to the Kansas City Royals in exchange for Kris Bubic.
