= Steven Cruz (baseball) =

Dominican baseball player (born 1999)

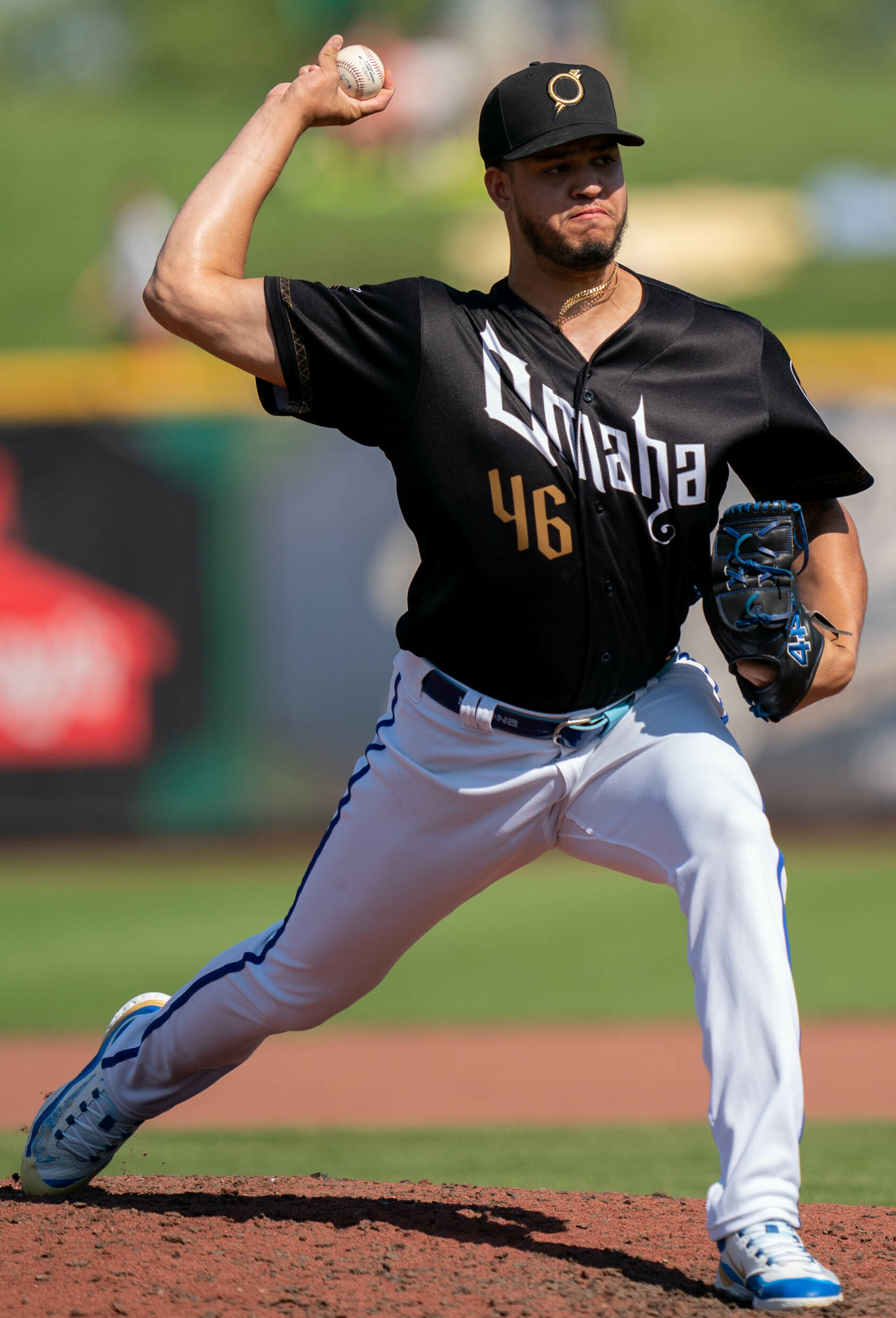
- Cruz with the Omaha Storm Chasers in 2023

Kansas City Royals – No. 64
- Pitcher
- Born: June 15, 1999 (age 27); Tenares, Dominican Republic
- Bats: Right Throws: Right

MLB debut
- August 29, 2023, for the Kansas City Royals

MLB statistics (through 2026 season)
- Win–loss record: 5–5
- Earned run average: 3.96
- Strikeouts: 122
- Stats at Baseball Reference

Teams
- Kansas City Royals (2023–present)

Steven Adalberto Cruz (born June 15, 1999) is a Dominican professional baseball pitcher for the Kansas City Royals of Major League Baseball (MLB).

== Career ==
=== Minnesota Twins ===
On March 20, 2017, Cruz signed a minor league contract with the Minnesota Twins organization. He made his professional debut with the Dominican Summer League Twins, posting a 3.68 ERA in 16 games. The following year, he played for the rookie–level Gulf Coast League Twins, recording a 3.12 ERA with 33 strikeouts in 26 innings pitched across 13 appearances. Cruz spent a third straight year in the rookie–league in 2019, playing in 17 games for the Elizabethton Twins and logging a 2.90 ERA with 48 strikeouts.

Cruz did not play in a game in 2020 due to the cancellation of the minor league season because of the COVID-19 pandemic. He returned to action in 2021, playing for the Single–A Fort Myers Miracle and High–A Cedar Rapids Kernels. In 28 combined contests, Cruz pitched to a 4–2 record and 4.32 ERA with 80 strikeouts across 50 innings pitched. In 2022, he pitched in 48 games out of the bullpen for the Double–A Wichita Wind Surge, registering a 5.14 ERA with 72 strikeouts in 56 innings of work.

=== Kansas City Royals ===
On January 24, 2023, the Minnesota Twins traded Cruz and Evan Sisk to the Kansas City Royals in exchange for Michael A. Taylor. In 43 appearances split between the Double–A Northwest Arkansas Naturals and Triple–A Omaha Storm Chasers, he worked to a cumulative 3.81 ERA with 64 strikeouts and 9 saves across 49 2/3 innings of work. On August 29, Cruz was promoted to the major leagues for the first time. In 10 appearances for Kansas City in his rookie campaign, he posted a 4.97 ERA with 15 strikeouts across 12 2/3 innings pitched.

Cruz was optioned to Triple–A Omaha to begin the 2024 season. He made five scoreless appearances for Kansas City on the year, striking out four batters across 5 2/3 innings pitched. Cruz was again optioned to Triple-A Omaha to begin the 2025 season. On May 9, 2025, Cruz recorded his first career win after tossing the final 2/3 innings of an extra-inning victory over the Boston Red Sox. He made 47 total appearances for the Royals during the regular season, accumulating a 3–1 record and 3.74 ERA with 38 strikeouts across 45 2/3 innings pitched.

Cruz was optioned to Triple-A Omaha to begin the 2026 season.
