= Kameron Misner =

American baseball player (born 1998)

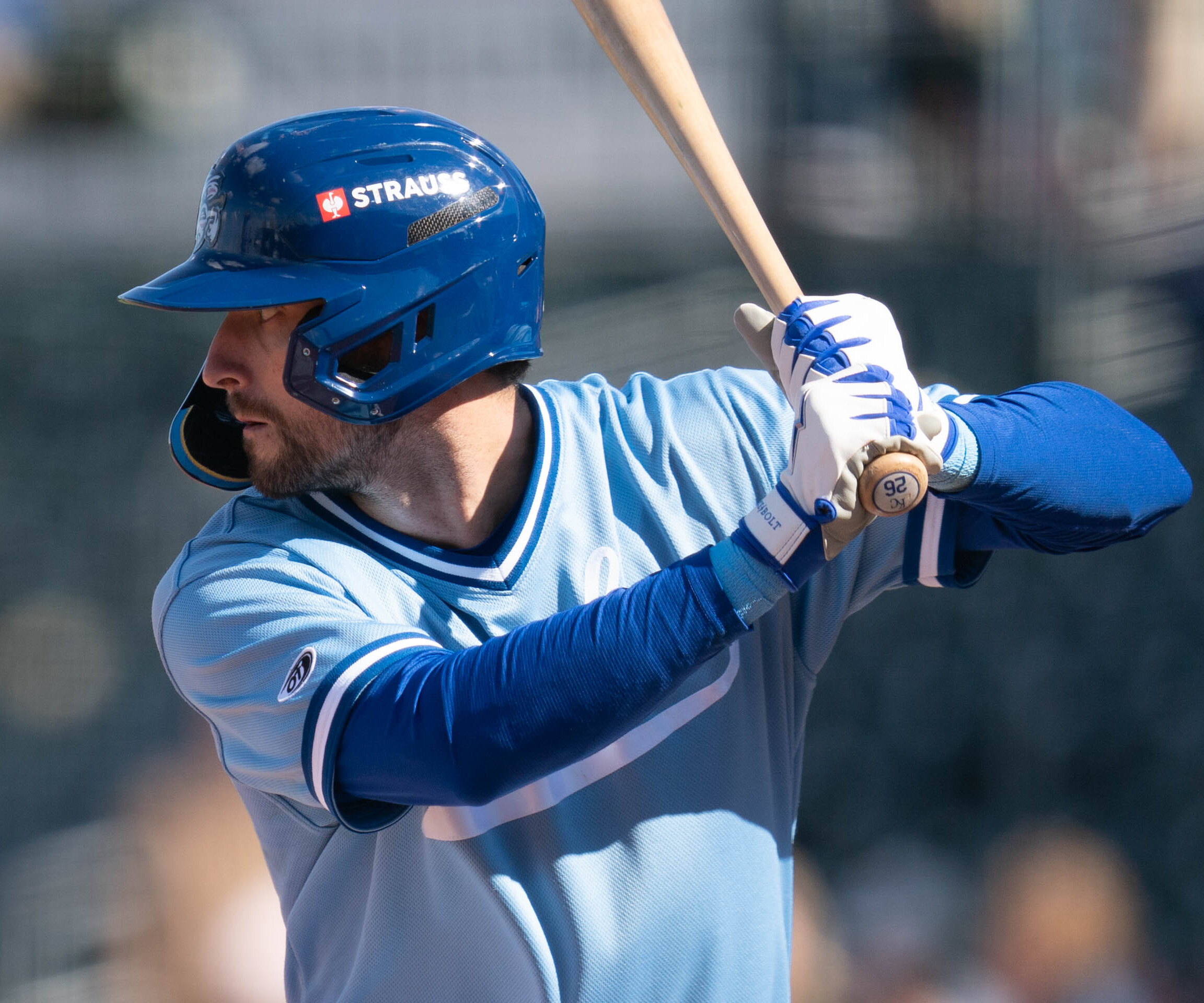
- Misner with the Omaha Storm Chasers in 2026

Philadelphia Phillies – No. 18
- Outfielder
- Born: January 8, 1998 (age 28); Poplar Bluff, Missouri, U.S.
- Bats: Left Throws: Left

MLB debut
- August 2, 2024, for the Tampa Bay Rays

MLB statistics (through 2026 season)
- Batting average: .206
- Home runs: 5
- Runs batted in: 26
- Stats at Baseball Reference

Teams
- Tampa Bay Rays (2024–2025); Kansas City Royals (2026)

Kameron Lee Misner (born January 8, 1998) is an American professional baseball outfielder for the Philadelphia Phillies of Major League Baseball (MLB). He previously played in MLB for the Tampa Bay Rays and Kansas City Royals.

== Amateur career ==
Misner attended and graduated from Poplar Bluff High School in Poplar Bluff, Missouri. As a senior, he batted .422 with eight home runs, 35 RBIs, and 29 stolen bases. After his senior year, he was drafted by the Kansas City Royals in the 33rd round of the 2016 Major League Baseball draft. However, he did not sign and instead chose to attend the University of Missouri to play college baseball for the Missouri Tigers.

As a freshman at Missouri in 2017, Misner slashed .282/.360/.446 with seven home runs and 34 RBIs in 58 games. He was named a Freshman All-American by D1Baseball. That summer, he played in the New England Collegiate Baseball League where he batted .378 with eight home runs, 25 RBIs, and 14 stolen bases in 135 at-bats, earning a spot on the All-Star team. In 2018, as a sophomore, he batted .360 with four home runs and 25 RBIs in 34 games before a foot injury forced him to miss the final 22 games of the season. Prior to the 2019 season, Misner was named a Preseason All-American by Baseball America and Perfect Game/Rawlings. In 56 games in 2019, Misner slashed .286/.440/.481 with ten home runs, 32 RBIs, and twenty stolen bases.

== Professional career ==
=== Miami Marlins ===
Misner was considered one of the top prospects for the 2019 Major League Baseball draft. He was selected by the Miami Marlins with the 35th overall pick, and signed with them for $2.1 million. Misner made his professional debut with the Rookie-level Gulf Coast Marlins and, after eight games, was promoted to the Clinton LumberKings of the Single–A Midwest League. Over 42 games between the two clubs, he batted .270/.388/.362 with two home runs and 24 RBI. He did not play in a game in 2020 due to the cancellation of the minor league season because of the COVID-19 pandemic.

Misner was assigned to the Beloit Snappers of the High-A Central to begin 2021. After slashing .244/.350/.424 with 11 home runs, 56 RBI, and 24 stolen bases over 88 games, he was promoted to the Pensacola Blue Wahoos of the Double-A South in late August. Over 14 games with Pensacola, Misner hit .309 with one home run and seven doubles. He was selected to play in the Arizona Fall League for the Mesa Solar Sox after the season.

=== Tampa Bay Rays ===
On November 30, 2021, the Marlins traded Misner to the Tampa Bay Rays in exchange for Joey Wendle. He was assigned to the Montgomery Biscuits of the Double-A Southern League for the 2022 season. Over 117 games, he slashed .251/.384/.431 with 16 home runs, 62 RBI, 25 doubles, and 32 stolen bases. For the 2023 season, Misner was assigned to the Durham Bulls of the Triple-A International League. Over 130 games, he batted .226 with 21 home runs, 58 RBI, and 21 stolen bases. He was assigned back to Durham to open the 2024 season.

On August 2, 2024, Misner was selected to the 40-man roster and promoted to the major leagues for the first time. In 8 games for Tampa Bay during his rookie campaign, Misner went 1-for-15 (.067).

Misner was initially optioned to Triple-A Durham to begin the 2025 season. However, following an injury to Richie Palacios, the Rays added Misner to their Opening Day roster. On March 28, 2025, Misner hit his first career home run, which was a walk-off against the Colorado Rockies and the first major-league home run in George M. Steinbrenner Field history. With this home run, Misner became the first player in MLB history to hit his first home run as a walkoff on opening day. In 71 appearances for Tampa Bay, he batted .213/.273/.345 with five home runs, 22 RBI, and eight stolen bases. Misner was designated for assignment by the Rays on November 6.

=== Kansas City Royals ===
On November 10, 2025, the Rays traded Misner to the Kansas City Royals in exchange for Matthew Hoskins. Misner was optioned to the Triple-A Omaha Storm Chasers to begin the 2026 season. The Royals promoted him to the major leagues on June 10, 2026, and he was optioned back to Omaha on July 10. Misner played in 18 games for the team, slashing .220/.256/.244 with four RBI and three stolen bases. Misner was designated for assignment by Kansas City on July 22, following the acquisition of Nate Pearson.

=== Philadelphia Phillies ===
On July 25, 2026, the Royals traded Misner to the Philadelphia Phillies in exchange for cash considerations. The Phillies subsequently optioned him to the Triple-A Lehigh Valley IronPigs. Misner played in 38 games for the IronPigs and batted .237 with eight home runs and 21 RBI.
