= Lucas Erceg =

American baseball player (born 1995)

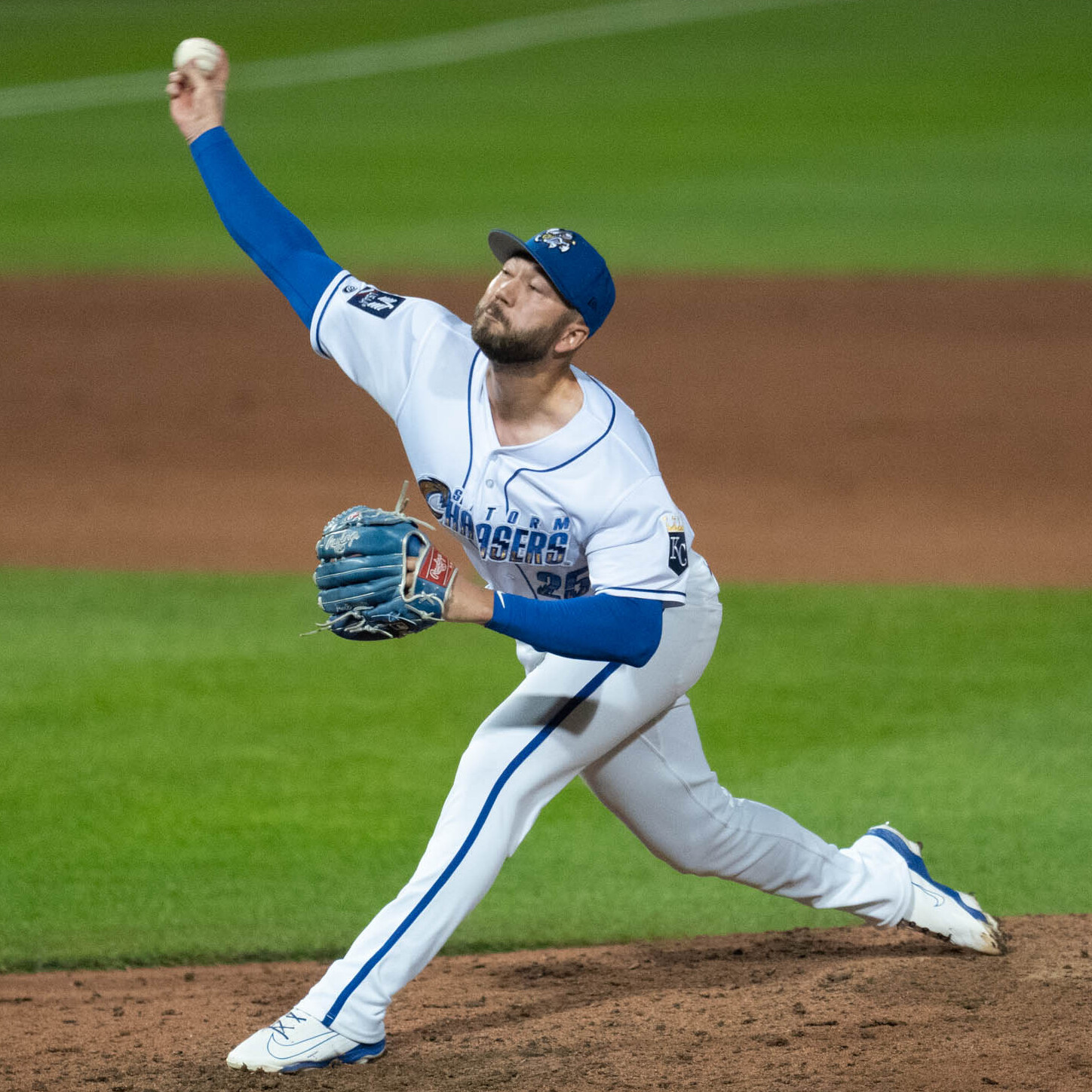
- Erceg with the Omaha Storm Chasers in 2026

Kansas City Royals – No. 60
- Pitcher
- Born: May 1, 1995 (age 31); San Jose, California, U.S.
- Bats: Left Throws: Right

MLB debut
- May 19, 2023, for the Oakland Athletics

MLB statistics (through 2026 season)
- Win–loss record: 18–18
- Earned run average: 3.98
- Strikeouts: 222
- Stats at Baseball Reference

Teams
- Oakland Athletics (2023–2024); Kansas City Royals (2024–present)

Lucas Stijepan Erceg (born May 1, 1995) is an American professional baseball pitcher for the Kansas City Royals of Major League Baseball (MLB). He has previously played in MLB for the Oakland Athletics, with whom he made his MLB debut in 2023.

== Early life and amateur career ==
Erceg grew up in Campbell, California. When he was a child, his mother had a drinking problem and his father was abusive. He attended Westmont High School in Campbell, California. He attended the University of California, Berkeley in 2014 and 2015 and played college baseball as a pitcher and third baseman for the California Golden Bears. He was named first team All-Pac-12 Conference in 2015. Prior to the 2016 season, he was ruled academically ineligible after he had started drinking heavily and stopped attending classes. He transferred to Menlo College.

== Professional career ==
=== Milwaukee Brewers ===
After one year at Menlo, the Milwaukee Brewers selected Erceg in the second round, with the 46th overall pick, of the 2016 Major League Baseball draft. He made his professional debut with the Helena Brewers of the Rookie-level Pioneer League and was promoted to the Wisconsin Timber Rattlers of the Single–A Midwest League after hitting .400 over 26 games. Erceg finished his first professional season with a .327 batting average, nine home runs and 51 runs batted in (RBI) in 68 total games between both teams. In 2017, he played for the Carolina Mudcats of the High–A Carolina League where he batted .256 with 15 home runs and 81 RBI in 127 games along with playing in three games for the Colorado Springs Sky Sox of the Triple–A Pacific Coast League at the end of the season.

MLB.com ranked Erceg as Milwaukee's fourth ranked prospect going into the 2018 season. He spent the 2018 season with the Biloxi Shuckers of the Double–A Southern League, batting .248 with 13 home runs and 51 RBI in 123 games. He spent 2019 with the San Antonio Missions of the Triple–A Pacific Coast League, slashing .218/.305/.398 with 15 home runs and 52 RBI over 116 games. Erceg did not play in a game in 2020 due to the cancellation of the minor league season because of the COVID-19 pandemic.

In 2021, Erceg began to focus more of his effort on pitching, along with still playing third base. Playing exclusively for Double-A Biloxi, he played in 50 games as a hitter, he slashed .223/.270/.379 with 3 home runs, 12 RBI, and 3 stolen bases. In 22 games (13 starts) as a pitcher, Erceg logged a 2-6 record and 5.29 earned run average (ERA) with 45 strikeouts in 47 2/3 innings pitched.

Erceg split the 2022 season between Biloxi and the Triple-A Nashville Sounds, pitching in 49 games and registering a 3-4 record and 4.55 ERA with 69 strikeouts and 2 saves in 61 1/3 innings of work. Erceg was assigned to Triple–A Nashville to begin the 2023 season, where he made 13 appearances and struggled to a 6.46 ERA with 16 strikeouts in 15 1/3 innings pitched.

=== Oakland Athletics ===
On May 17, 2023, Erceg was traded to the Oakland Athletics in exchange for cash considerations. On May 19, Erceg was selected to the 40-man roster and promoted to the major leagues for the first time. He made his MLB debut that night versus the Houston Astros, allowing one run over one inning and recording one strikeout. In his rookie campaign, Erceg made 50 appearances out of the bullpen, compiling a 4–4 record and 4.75 ERA with 68 strikeouts across 55 innings pitched.

Erceg made 38 appearances for Oakland in 2024, recording a 3.68 ERA with 41 strikeouts and 3 saves across 36 2/3 innings of work.

=== Kansas City Royals ===
On July 30, 2024, the Athletics traded Erceg to the Kansas City Royals in exchange for Mason Barnett, Will Klein, and Jared Dickey. He made 23 appearances down the stretch for the Royals, compiling an 0-3 record and 2.88 ERA with 31 strikeouts and 11 saves over 25 innings of work.

Erceg made 61 appearances out of the bullpen for Kansas City in 2025, posting an 8-4 record and 2.64 ERA with 48 strikeouts and two saves across 61 1/3 innings pitched. On September 19, 2025, Erceg was placed on the injured list due right shoulder impingement syndrome, ending his season.

== Personal life ==
Erceg's father is from Croatia. Erceg developed a drinking problem while at Cal which caused him to flunk out and experience suicidal thoughts. In June 2020, his girlfriend, Emma, whom he had met at Menlo College, threatened to leave him unless he stopped drinking. He quit cold turkey without a treatment program, and, as of August 2025, has been sober since. Erceg's first day of sobriety, June 10, 2020, is sewn onto his baseball glove. Erceg and Emma were engaged in July 2021 and married the following year. In late June 2025, the couple announced they were expecting their first child.
