= 2025 San Diego Padres season =

2025 San Diego Padres
- National League Wild Card
- League: National League
- Division: West
- Ballpark: Petco Park
- City: San Diego, California
- Record: 90–72 (.556)
- Divisional place: 2nd
- Owners: Seidler Equity Partners
- General managers: A. J. Preller
- Managers: Mike Shildt
- Television: MLB.tv
- Radio: KWFN · KBZT

The 2025 San Diego Padres season was the 57th season of the San Diego Padres franchise. The Padres competed in Major League Baseball (MLB) as a member club of the National League (NL) West Division. The team played its home games at Petco Park.

With an April 16 victory over the Chicago Cubs, the Padres tied their best-19 game start in franchise history at 15–4. At the July trade deadline, the team experienced a roster makeover, trading for Ramon Laureano, Ryan O’Hearn, Nestor Cortes, Freddy Fermín, JP Sears, and All-Star closer Mason Miller. The Padres held a lead at top of the NL West on August 23, the latest they've held a lead in the division during a season since 2010; however, they finished in second place in the division behind the Los Angeles Dodgers for the second straight season.

On September 22, the Padres clinched a postseason berth for the second consecutive season and fourth time in the last six years with a walk-off victory against the Milwaukee Brewers. As the fifth seed Wild Card team, they played the Cubs on the road in the National League Wild Card Series, which they lost in three games. At the conclusion of the round, manager Mike Shildt announced his retirement.

The San Diego Padres drew an average home attendance of 42,434, the 2nd-highest of all baseball teams in the world.

== Offseason ==
=== Acquisitions ===
Position	Player	2024 Team	Contract
1B/OF	Trenton Brooks	San Francisco Giants	Minor league
OF	Oscar Gonzalez	New York Yankees	Minor league
C	Martin Maldonado	Chicago White Sox	Minor league
1B/OF	Gavin Sheets	Chicago White Sox	Minor league
1B/OF	Connor Joe	Pittsburgh Pirates	One-year, $1 million
OF	Jason Heyward	Houston Astros	One-year, $1 million
SP	Kyle Hart	NC Dinos (KBO)	One-year, $1.5 million
SP	Nick Pivetta	Boston Red Sox	Four-year, $55 million
1B	Yuli Gurriel	Kansas City Royals	Minor league
IF	Jose Iglesias	New York Mets	Minor league

=== Departures ===
Position	Player	2025 Team	Contract
OF	Jurickson Profar	Atlanta Braves	Three-year, $42 million
C	Kyle Higashioka	Texas Rangers	Two-year, $12.5 million
IF	Donovan Solano	Seattle Mariners	One-year, $3.5 million
RP	Tanner Scott	Los Angeles Dodgers	Four-year, $72 million
SP	Martín Pérez	Chicago White Sox	One-year, $5 million
OF	David Peralta	Free agent	—
SS	Nick Ahmed	Texas Rangers	Minor league
IF	Ha-seong Kim	Tampa Bay Rays	Two-year, $29 million

=== Trades ===
January 24, 2025	Traded cash to the Chicago White Sox for RHP Ron Marinaccio.

== Regular season ==
=== Game log ===
2025 Game Log: 90–72 (Home: 52–29; Away: 38–43)
March/April: 19–11 (Home: 14–4; Away: 5–7)

#	Date	Opponent	Score	Win	Loss	Save	Attendance	Record	Streak
1	March 27	Braves	7–4	**Peralta** (1–0)	Neris (0–1)	**Suárez** (1)	45,568	1–0	W1
2	March 28	Braves	4–3	**Adam** (1–0)	Lee (0–1)	**Suárez** (2)	41,058	2–0	W2
3	March 29	Braves	1–0	**Peralta** (2–0)	Bummer (0–1)	**Morejón** (1)	40,587	3–0	W3
4	March 30	Braves	5–0	**Pivetta** (1–0)	Smith-Shawver (0–1)	—	41,269	4–0	W4
5	March 31	Guardians	7–2	**Hart** (1–0)	Ortiz (0–1)	—	43,404	5–0	W5
6	April 1	Guardians	7–0	**King** (1–0)	Allen (0–1)	—	37,120	6–0	W6
7	April 2	Guardians	5–2	**Cease** (1–0)	Lively (0–1)	**Suárez** (3)	35,858	7–0	W7
8	April 4	@ Cubs	1–3	Imanaga (2–0)	**Vásquez** (0–1)	Pressly (3)	40,244	7–1	L1
9	April 5	@ Cubs	1–7	Boyd (1–0)	**Pivetta** (1–1)	—	35,391	7–2	L2
10	April 6	@ Cubs	8–7	**Adam** (2–0)	Pressly (0–1)	**Suárez** (4)	33,941	8–2	W1
11	April 7	@ Athletics	5–4	**King** (2–0)	Severino (0–2)	**Suárez** (5)	9,502	9–2	W2
12	April 8	@ Athletics	4–10	Springs (2–1)	**Cease** (1–1)	—	9,018	9–3	L1
13	April 9	@ Athletics	2–1	**Vásquez** (1–1)	Bido (1–1)	**Suárez** (6)	10,553	10–3	W1
14	April 11	Rockies	8–0	**Pivetta** (2–1)	Márquez (0–2)	—	44,089	11–3	W2
15	April 12	Rockies	2–0	**Hart** (2–0)	Dollander (1–1)	**Suárez** (7)	44,066	12–3	W3
16	April 13	Rockies	6–0	**King** (3–0)	Freeland (0–3)	—	42,706	13–3	W4
17	April 14	Cubs	10–4	**Morejón** (1–0)	Pearson (0–1)	—	47,078	14–3	W5
18	April 15	Cubs	1–2 (10)	Pressly (1–1)	**Matsui** (0–1)	Thielbar (1)	42,492	14–4	L1
19	April 16	Cubs	4–2	**Pivetta** (3–1)	Boyd (1–2)	**Suárez** (8)	41,562	15–4	W1
20	April 18	@ Astros	4–6	Gusto (2–1)	**Hart** (2–1)	Hader (5)	41,431	15–5	L1
21	April 19	@ Astros	2–3	Scott (1–1)	**Estrada** (0–1)	Hader (6)	39,287	15–6	L2
22	April 20	@ Astros	3–2	**Jacob** (1–0)	Scott (1–2)	**Suárez** (9)	31,940	16–6	W1
23	April 21	@ Tigers	4–6	Hanifee (1–0)	**Vásquez** (1–2)	Vest (2)	17,581	16–7	L1
24	April 22	@ Tigers	2–0	**Pivetta** (4–1)	Flaherty (1–2)	**Suárez** (10)	19,321	17–7	W1
25	April 23	@ Tigers	0–6	Olson (3–1)	**Hart** (2–2)	—	21,016	17–8	L1
26	April 25	Rays	0–1	Baz (3–0)	**King** (3–1)	Cleavinger (1)	43,319	17–9	L2
27	April 26	Rays	1–4	Pepiot (2–3)	**Cease** (1–2)	Fairbanks (5)	44,768	17–10	L3
28	April 27	Rays	2–4	Littell (1–5)	**Vásquez** (1–3)	Fairbanks (6)	42,221	17–11	L4
29	April 29	Giants	7–4	**Pivetta** (5–1)	Webb (3–2)	**Suárez** (11)	47,345	18–11	W1
30	April 30	Giants	5–3	**King** (4–1)	Roupp (2–2)	**Suárez** (12)	37,698	19–11	W2

May: 13–13 (Home: 5–6; Away: 8–7)

#	Date	Opponent	Score	Win	Loss	Save	Attendance	Record	Streak
31	May 2	@ Pirates	9–4	**Estrada** (1–1)	Keller (1–3)	—	12,349	20–11	W3
32	May 3	@ Pirates	2–1	**Adam** (3–0)	Bednar (0–3)	**Suárez** (13)	17,675	21–11	W4
33	May 4	@ Pirates	4–0	**Kolek** (1–0)	Heaney (2–3)	—	17,184	22–11	W5
34	May 5	@ Yankees	4–3	**Bergert** (1–0)	Weaver (0–1)	**Suárez** (14)	38,128	23–11	W6
35	May 6	@ Yankees	3–12	Cruz (1–0)	**Morejón** (1–1)	—	38,090	23–12	L1
36	May 7	@ Yankees	3–4 (10)	Williams (1–2)	**Estrada** (1–2)	—	42,302	23–13	L2
37	May 9	@ Rockies	13–9	**Vásquez** (2–3)	Senzatela (1–6)	**Suárez** (15)	30,490	24–13	W1
38	May 10	@ Rockies	21–0	**Kolek** (2–0)	Blalock (0–2)	—	38,423	25–13	W2
39	May 11	@ Rockies	3–9	Márquez (1–6)	**Pivetta** (5–2)	—	34,422	25–14	L1
40	May 12	Angels	5–9	Burke (4–0)	**Suárez** (0–1)	—	41,419	25–15	L2
41	May 13	Angels	6–4	**Adam** (4–0)	Jansen (0–2)	—	43,957	26–15	W1
42	May 14	Angels	5–1	**Vásquez** (3–3)	Hendricks (1–5)	—	43,766	27–15	W2
43	May 16	Mariners	1–5	Evans (2–1)	**Kolek** (2–1)	—	41,336	27–16	L1
44	May 17	Mariners	1–4	Speier (2–0)	**Morejón** (1–2)	Muñoz (14)	42,240	27–17	L2
45	May 18	Mariners	1–6	Woo (5–1)	**King** (4–2)	—	43,320	27–18	L3
46	May 20	@ Blue Jays	0–3	Bassitt (4–2)	**Cease** (1–3)	Hoffman (10)	23,597	27–19	L4
47	May 21	@ Blue Jays	0–14	Gausman (4–4)	**Vásquez** (3–4)	—	23,266	27–20	L5
48	May 22	@ Blue Jays	6–7 (11)	Fisher (1–0)	**Estrada** (1–3)	—	33,971	27–21	L6
49	May 23	@ Braves	2–1	**Adam** (5–0)	Iglesias (3–4)	**Suárez** (16)	40,327	28–21	W1
50	May 24	@ Braves	1–7	Holmes (3–3)	**Reynolds** (0–1)	—	41,338	28–22	L1
51	May 25	@ Braves	5–3	**Estrada** (2–3)	Schwellenbach (3–4)	**Suárez** (17)	41,251	29–22	W1
52	May 26	Marlins	4–3 (11)	**Morejón** (2–2)	Gibson (0–2)	—	40,872	30–22	W2
53	May 27	Marlins	8–6	**Kolek** (3–1)	Gibson (0–3)	**Estrada** (1)	40,363	31–22	W3
54	May 28	Marlins	8–10	Henríquez (3–1)	**Adam** (5–1)	Faucher (3)	33,885	31–23	L1
55	May 30	Pirates	3–2	**Pivetta** (6–3)	Keller (1–7)	**Suárez** (18)	42,579	32–23	W1
56	May 31	Pirates	0–5	Falter (4–3)	**Cease** (1–4)	—	42,471	32–24	L1

June: 13–15 (Home: 6–4; Away: 7–11)

#	Date	Opponent	Score	Win	Loss	Save	Attendance	Record	Streak
57	June 1	Pirates	6–4	**Morejón** (3–2)	Rainey (0–1)	**Suárez** (19)	42,069	33–24	W1
58	June 2	@ Giants	1–0 (10)	**Suárez** (1–1)	Walker (1–3)	—	35,680	34–24	W2
59	June 3	@ Giants	3–2 (10)	**Matsui** (1–1)	Bivens (1–2)	**Estrada** (2)	35,522	35–24	W3
60	June 4	@ Giants	5–6	Hjelle (1–0)	**Adam** (5–2)	Rodríguez (1)	34,821	35–25	L1
61	June 5	@ Giants	2–3	Ray (8–1)	**Cease** (1–5)	Doval (8)	37,436	35–26	L2
62	June 6	@ Brewers	2–0	**Peralta** (3–0)	Patrick (3–5)	**Suárez** (20)	32,298	36–26	W1
63	June 7	@ Brewers	3–4	Megill (1–2)	**Morgan** (0–1)	—	37,032	36–27	L1
64	June 8	@ Brewers	1–0	**Matsui** (2–1)	Zastryzny (1–1)	**Suárez** (21)	26,265	37–27	W1
65	June 9	Dodgers	7–8 (10)	Yates (4–2)	**Peralta** (3–1)	Scott (12)	45,678	37–28	L1
66	June 10	Dodgers	11–1	**Cease** (2–5)	Sauer (1–1)	—	45,084	38–28	W1
67	June 11	Dodgers	2–5	Trivino (2–0)	**Morejón** (3–3)	Vesia (3)	45,481	38–29	L1
68	June 13	@ Diamondbacks	1–5	Nelson (3–2)	**Kolek** (3–2)	—	33,052	38–30	L2
69	June 14	@ Diamondbacks	7–8	Ginkel (1–3)	**Suárez** (1–2)	—	37,561	38–31	L3
70	June 15	@ Diamondbacks	8–2	**Pivetta** (7–2)	Kelly (6–3)	—	42,676	39–31	W1
71	June 16	@ Dodgers	3–6	Casparius (5–1)	**Cease** (2–6)	Yates (2)	53,207	39–32	L1
72	June 17	@ Dodgers	6–8	Sauer (2–1)	**Estrada** (2–4)	Scott (14)	51,555	39–33	L2
73	June 18	@ Dodgers	3–4	Wrobleski (2–2)	**Suárez** (1–3)	—	53,568	39–34	L3
74	June 19	@ Dodgers	5–3	**Morejón** (4–3)	Yamamoto (6–6)	**Matsui** (1)	53,280	40–34	W1
75	June 20	Royals	5–6	Erceg (2–2)	**Adam** (5–3)	Estévez (22)	43,574	40–35	L1
76	June 21	Royals	5–1	**Cease** (3–6)	Cameron (2–3)	—	43,241	41–35	W1
77	June 22	Royals	3–2	**Suárez** (2–3)	Lynch IV (3–2)	—	43,567	42–35	W2
78	June 23	Nationals	6–10	Parker (5–8)	**Kolek** (3–3)	—	44,074	42–36	L1
79	June 24	Nationals	4–3	**Adam** (6–3)	Williams (3–9)	**Suárez** (22)	41,229	43–36	W1
80	June 25	Nationals	1–0	**Pivetta** (8–2)	Gore (3–8)	**Morejón** (2)	40,532	44–36	W2
81	June 27	@ Reds	1–8	Martinez (5–8)	**Cease** (3–7)	—	26,746	44–37	L1
82	June 28	@ Reds	6–4	**Hoeing** (1–0)	Richardson (0–2)	**Suárez** (23)	31,380	45–37	W1
83	June 29	@ Reds	2–3	Pagán (1–2)	**Suárez** (2–4)	—	23,510	45–38	L1
84	June 30	@ Phillies	0–4	Wheeler (8–3)	**Waldron** (0–1)	—	43,138	45–39	L2

July: 15–10 (Home: 9–4; Away: 6–6)

#	Date	Opponent	Score	Win	Loss	Save	Attendance	Record	Streak
―	July 1	@ Phillies	Postponed (rain); Makeup: July 2						
85	July 2 (1)	@ Phillies	6–4	**Pivetta** (9–2)	Abel (2–2)	**Suárez** (24)	40,144	46–39	W1
86	July 2 (2)	@ Phillies	1–5	Sánchez (7–2)	**Cease** (3–8)	—	40,742	46–40	L1
87	July 4	Rangers	3–2 (10)	**Morejón** (5–3)	Garcia (1–4)	—	45,144	47–40	W1
88	July 5	Rangers	4–7	Corbin (5–7)	**Kolek** (3–4)	Armstrong (3)	42,297	47–41	L1
89	July 6	Rangers	4–1	**Hart** (3–2)	Leiter (4–6)	**Suárez** (25)	40,711	48–41	W1
90	July 7	Diamondbacks	3–6	Gallen (7–9)	**Darvish** (0–1)	Ginkel (2)	40,045	48–42	L1
91	July 8	Diamondbacks	1–0	**Morejón** (6–3)	Kelly (7–5)	**Suárez** (26)	38,670	49–42	W1
92	July 9	Diamondbacks	2–8	Pfaadt (9–6)	**Cease** (3–9)	—	43,066	49–43	L1
93	July 10	Diamondbacks	4–3	**Morejón** (7–3)	Rodríguez (3–6)	**Suárez** (27)	39,079	50–43	W1
94	July 11	Phillies	4–2	**Estrada** (3–4)	Suárez (7–3)	**Suárez** (28)	43,856	51–43	W2
95	July 12	Phillies	5–4	**Morgan** (1–1)	Banks (2–1)	**Estrada** (3)	43,444	52–43	W3
96	July 13	Phillies	1–2	Sánchez (8–2)	**Morejón** (7–4)	Strahm (6)	43,398	52–44	L1
**95th All-Star Game: Cumberland, GA**
97	July 18	@ Nationals	7–2	**Peralta** (4–1)	Finnegan (1–4)	—	22,316	53–44	W1
98	July 19	@ Nationals	2–4	Parker (6–10)	**Darvish** (0–2)	Finnegan (19)	31,136	53–45	L1
99	July 20	@ Nationals	8–1	**Pivetta** (10–2)	Gore (4–9)	—	21,996	54–45	W1
100	July 21	@ Marlins	2–1	**Morejón** (8–4)	Pérez (3–3)	**Suárez** (29)	11,128	55–45	W2
101	July 22	@ Marlins	3–4	Cabrera (4–4)	**Kolek** (3–5)	Henríquez (6)	11,621	55–46	L1
102	July 23	@ Marlins	2–3	Alcántara (5–9)	**Cease** (3–10)	Faucher (9)	15,137	55–47	L2
103	July 24	@ Cardinals	7–9	Gray (10–4)	**Darvish** (0–3)	Helsley (20)	30,601	55–48	L3
104	July 25	@ Cardinals	0–3	Mikolas (6–7)	**Pivetta** (10–3)	Helsley (21)	29,297	55–49	L4
105	July 26	@ Cardinals	3–1	**Estrada** (4–4)	Liberatore (6–8)	**Suárez** (30)	25,699	56–49	W1
106	July 27	@ Cardinals	9–2	**Kolek** (4–5)	McGreevy (2–2)	—	26,080	57–49	W2
107	July 28	Mets	7–6	**Suárez** (3–4)	Soto (0–3)	—	43,596	58–49	W3
108	July 29	Mets	7–1	**Peralta** (5–1)	Buttó (3–2)	—	45,088	59–49	W4
109	July 30	Mets	5–0	**Darvish** (1–3)	Holmes (9–6)	—	42,627	60–49	W5

August: 16–12 (Home: 9–4; Away: 7–8)

#	Date	Opponent	Score	Win	Loss	Save	Attendance	Record	Streak
110	August 1	Cardinals	4–1	**Pivetta** (11–3)	Liberatore (6–9)	**Suárez** (31)	43,933	61–49	W6
111	August 2	Cardinals	5–8	McGreevy (3–2)	**Vásquez** (3–5)	Romero (1)	44,553	61–50	L1
112	August 3	Cardinals	7–3	**Cease** (4–10)	Pallante (6–8)	**Suárez** (32)	44,709	62–50	W1
113	August 4	@ Diamondbacks	2–6	Pfaadt (11–7)	**Sears** (7–10)	Backhus (1)	20,196	62–51	L1
114	August 5	@ Diamondbacks	10–5 (11)	**Suárez** (4–4)	Woodford (0–2)	—	20,903	63–51	W1
115	August 6	@ Diamondbacks	3–2	**Morejón** (9–4)	Backhus (0–2)	**Miller** (21)	22,692	64–51	W2
116	August 8	Red Sox	2–10	Buehler (7–6)	**Pivetta** (11–4)	—	44,061	64–52	L1
117	August 9	Red Sox	5–4 (10)	**Adam** (7–3)	Whitlock (5–2)	—	42,389	65–52	W1
118	August 10	Red Sox	6–2	**Cease** (5–10)	Bello (8–6)	—	43,323	66–52	W2
119	August 11	@ Giants	4–1	**Darvish** (2–3)	Webb (10–9)	**Suárez** (33)	31,018	67–52	W3
120	August 12	@ Giants	5–1	**Adam** (8–3)	Ray (9–6)	—	36,186	68–52	W4
121	August 13	@ Giants	11–1	**Pivetta** (12–4)	Teng (1–2)	—	35,080	69–52	W5
122	August 15	@ Dodgers	2–3	Kershaw (7–2)	**Vásquez** (3–6)	Dreyer (2)	53,119	69–53	L1
123	August 16	@ Dodgers	0–6	Snell (3–1)	**Cease** (5–11)	—	53,606	69–54	L2
124	August 17	@ Dodgers	4–5	Vesia (3–2)	**Suárez** (4–5)	—	48,189	69–55	L3
125	August 18	Giants	3–4	Ray (10–6)	**Cortés Jr.** (1–2)	Rodríguez (4)	42,730	69–56	L4
126	August 19	Giants	5–1	**Pivetta** (13–4)	Teng (1–3)	—	40,624	70–56	W1
127	August 20	Giants	8–1	**Sears** (8–10)	Roupp (7–7)	—	42,589	71–56	W2
128	August 21	Giants	8–4	**Cease** (6–11)	Verlander (1–10)	—	39,156	72–56	W3
129	August 22	Dodgers	2–1	**Darvish** (3–3)	Snell (3–2)	**Suárez** (34)	44,864	73–56	W4
130	August 23	Dodgers	5–1	**Cortés Jr.** (2–2)	Glasnow (1–2)	**Morejón** (3)	46,326	74–56	W5
131	August 24	Dodgers	2–8	Yamamoto (11–8)	**Estrada** (4–5)	—	43,827	74–57	L1
132	August 25	@ Mariners	6–9	Miller (3–5)	**Morgan** (1–2)	—	27,785	74–58	L2
133	August 26	@ Mariners	7–6	**Morejón** (10–4)	Ferguson (3–4)	**Suárez** (35)	35,910	75–58	W1
134	August 27	@ Mariners	3–4	Woo (12–7)	**Darvish** (3–4)	Muñoz (31)	37,600	75–59	L1
135	August 29	@ Twins	4–7	Matthews (4–4)	**Cortés Jr.** (2–3)	Funderburk (1)	24,336	75–60	L2
136	August 30	@ Twins	12–3	**Morejón** (11–4)	Abel (2–4)	—	23,971	76–60	W1
137	August 31	@ Twins	2–7	Ryan (13–7)	**Hart** (3–3)	—	26,956	76–61	L1

September: 14–11 (Home: 8–7; Away: 5–4)

#	Date	Opponent	Score	Win	Loss	Save	Attendance	Record	Streak
138	September 1	Orioles	3–4	Enns (2–2)	**Adam** (8–4)	Akin (4)	45,586	76–62	L2
139	September 2	Orioles	2–6	Wells (1–0)	**Darvish** (3–5)	—	42,536	76–63	L3
140	September 3	Orioles	5–7	Povich (3–7)	**Cortés Jr.** (2–4)	Canó (2)	35,019	76–64	L4
141	September 5	@ Rockies	0–3	Freeland (4–14)	**Pivetta** (13–5)	Vodnik (7)	30,073	76–65	L5
142	September 6	@ Rockies	10–8	**Vásquez** (4–6)	Brown (0–3)	**Suárez** (36)	43,461	77–65	W1
143	September 7	@ Rockies	8–1	**Cease** (7–11)	Gordon (5–6)	—	27,555	78–65	W2
144	September 8	Reds	4–3 (10)	**Peralta** (6–1)	Martinez (10–12)	—	40,248	79–65	W3
145	September 9	Reds	2–4	Phillips (2–0)	**Suárez** (4–6)	Pagán (27)	41,364	79–66	L1
146	September 10	Reds	1–2	Abbott (9–6)	**Morejón** (11–5)	Santillan (6)	40,045	79–67	L2
147	September 11	Rockies	2–0	**Vásquez** (5–6)	Brown (0–4)	**Suárez** (37)	38,844	80–67	W1
148	September 12	Rockies	2–4	Gordon (6–6)	**Sears** (8–11)	Vodnik (8)	40,014	80–68	L1
149	September 13	Rockies	11–3	**Cease** (8–11)	Blalock (1–5)	—	41,854	81–68	W1
150	September 14	Rockies	9–6	**Darvish** (4–5)	Márquez (3–14)	**Suárez** (38)	40,693	82–68	W2
151	September 16	@ Mets	3–8	Manaea (2–3)	**King** (4–3)	—	41,819	82–69	L1
152	September 17	@ Mets	7–4	**Morejón** (12–5)	Peterson (9–6)	**Suárez** (39)	41,783	83–69	W1
153	September 18	@ Mets	1–6	Tong (2–2)	**Vásquez** (5–7)	—	38,127	83–70	L1
154	September 19	@ White Sox	3–4	Martin (7–10)	**Cease** (8–12)	Taylor (5)	30,505	83–71	L2
155	September 20	@ White Sox	7–3	**Morejón** (13–5)	Gómez (3–3)	—	27,345	84–71	W1
156	September 21	@ White Sox	3–2	**King** (5–3)	Burke (4–11)	**Suárez** (40)	24,205	85–71	W2
157	September 22	Brewers	5–4 (11)	**Rodríguez** (1–0)	Anderson (2–6)	—	42,371	86–71	W3
158	September 23	Brewers	7–0	**Vásquez** (6–7)	Zimmermann (0–1)	—	44,089	87–71	W4
159	September 24	Brewers	1–3	Ashby (5–2)	**Morejón** (13–6)	Uribe (6)	41,462	87–72	L1
160	September 26	Diamondbacks	7–4	**Darvish** (5–5)	Gallen (13–15)	**Miller** (22)	44,547	88–72	W1
161	September 27	Diamondbacks	5–1	**Matsui** (3–1)	Rodríguez (9–9)	—	44,457	89–72	W2
162	September 28	Diamondbacks	12–4	**Sears** (9–11)	Pfaadt (13–9)	—	45,072	90–72	W3

Legend: = Win = Loss = Clinched playoff spot = Postponement
Bold = Padres team member

=== Season standings ===
==== National League West ====
NL West
Team	W	L	Pct.	GB	Home	Road
Los Angeles Dodgers	93	69	.574	—	52‍–‍29	41‍–‍40
San Diego Padres	90	72	.556	3	52‍–‍29	38‍–‍43
San Francisco Giants	81	81	.500	12	42‍–‍39	39‍–‍42
Arizona Diamondbacks	80	82	.494	13	43‍–‍38	37‍–‍44
Colorado Rockies	43	119	.265	50	25‍–‍56	18‍–‍63

==== National League Wild Card ====
Division leaders
Team	W	L	Pct.
Milwaukee Brewers	97	65	.599
Philadelphia Phillies	96	66	.593
Los Angeles Dodgers	93	69	.574

Wild Card teams (Top 3 teams qualify for postseason)
Team	W	L	Pct.	GB
Chicago Cubs	92	70	.568	+9
San Diego Padres	90	72	.556	+7
Cincinnati Reds	83	79	.512	—
New York Mets	83	79	.512	—
San Francisco Giants	81	81	.500	2
Arizona Diamondbacks	80	82	.494	3
Miami Marlins	79	83	.488	4
St. Louis Cardinals	78	84	.481	5
Atlanta Braves	76	86	.469	7
Pittsburgh Pirates	71	91	.438	12
Washington Nationals	66	96	.407	17
Colorado Rockies	43	119	.265	40

==== Record vs. opponents ====
===== Record vs. National League =====
2025 National League record Source: MLB Standings Grid – 2025
Team	AZ	ATL	CHC	CIN	COL	LAD	MIA	MIL	NYM	PHI	PIT	SD	SF	STL	WSH	AL
Arizona	—	4–2	3–4	2–4	8–5	6–7	3–3	4–3	3–3	3–3	2–4	5–8	7–6	3–3	2–4	25–23
Atlanta	2–4	—	2–4	5–2	4–2	1–5	8–5	2–4	8–5	5–8	2–4	1–6	1–5	4–2	9–4	22–26
Chicago	4–3	4–2	—	5–8	5–1	4–3	4–2	7–6	2–4	2–4	10–3	3–3	1–5	8–5	3–3	30–18
Cincinnati	4–2	2–5	8–5	—	5–1	1–5	3–4	5–8	4–2	3–3	7–6	4–2	3–3	6–7	2–4	26–22
Colorado	5–8	2–4	1–5	1–5	—	2–11	3–3	2–4	0–6	0–7	2–4	3–10	2–11	4–2	4–3	12–36
Los Angeles	7–6	5–1	3–4	5–1	11–2	—	5–1	0–6	3–4	2–4	2–4	9–4	9–4	2–4	3–3	27–21
Miami	3–3	5–8	2–4	4–3	3–3	1–5	—	3–3	7–6	4–9	4–3	3–3	4–2	3–3	7–6	26–22
Milwaukee	3–4	4–2	6–7	8–5	4–2	6–0	3–3	—	4–2	4–2	10–3	2–4	2–5	7–6	6–0	28–20
New York	3–3	5–8	4–2	2–4	6–0	4–3	6–7	2–4	—	7–6	2–4	2–4	4–2	5–2	7–6	24–24
Philadelphia	3–3	8–5	4–2	3–3	7–0	4–2	9–4	2–4	6–7	—	3–3	3–3	3–4	2–4	8–5	31–17
Pittsburgh	4–2	4–2	3–10	6–7	4–2	4–2	3–4	3–10	4–2	3–3	—	1–5	4–2	7–6	4–3	17–31
San Diego	8–5	6–1	3–3	2–4	10–3	4–9	3–3	4–2	4–2	3–3	5–1	—	10–3	4–3	4–2	20–28
San Francisco	6–7	5–1	5–1	3–3	11–2	4–9	2–4	5–2	2–4	4–3	2–4	3–10	—	2–4	3–3	24–24
St. Louis	3–3	2–4	5–8	7–6	2–4	4–2	3–3	6–7	2–5	4–2	6–7	3–4	4–2	—	5–1	22–26
Washington	4–2	4–9	3–3	4–2	3–4	3–3	6–7	0–6	6–7	5–8	3–4	2–4	3–3	1–5	—	19–29

Updated with the results of all games through September 28, 2025.

===== Record vs. American League =====
2025 National League record vs. American League Source: MLB Standings
Team	ATH	BAL	BOS	CWS	CLE	DET	HOU	KC	LAA	MIN	NYY	SEA	TB	TEX	TOR
Arizona	2–1	2–1	2–1	2–1	2–1	0–3	0–3	1–2	1–2	2–1	2–1	3–0	1–2	4–2	1–2
Atlanta	1–2	0–3	3–3	2–1	3–0	3–0	1–2	1–2	1–2	3–0	1–2	1–2	1–2	0–3	1–2
Chicago	3–0	2–1	2–1	5–1	3–0	1–2	1–2	1–2	3–0	1–2	2–1	1–2	2–1	2–1	1–2
Cincinnati	0–3	2–1	1–2	1–2	5–1	2–1	1–2	2–1	2–1	2–1	2–1	1–2	3–0	1–2	1–2
Colorado	1–2	1–2	0–3	1–2	1–2	0–3	2–4	0–3	2–1	2–1	1–2	0–3	1–2	0–3	0–3
Los Angeles	2–1	1–2	1–2	3–0	2–1	3–0	0–3	2–1	0–6	2–1	2–1	3–0	2–1	2–1	2–1
Miami	1–2	2–1	1–2	1–2	1–2	2–1	1–2	2–1	2–1	2–1	3–0	1–2	3–3	3–0	1–2
Milwaukee	2–1	2–1	3–0	2–1	1–2	2–1	2–1	2–1	3–0	4–2	0–3	2–1	1–2	0–3	2–1
New York	2–1	1–2	1–2	2–1	0–3	2–1	1–2	2–1	3–0	1–2	3–3	2–1	0–3	1–2	3–0
Philadelphia	2–1	2–1	2–1	1–2	2–1	2–1	0–3	2–1	1–2	2–1	2–1	3–0	3–0	3–0	4–2
Pittsburgh	2–1	0–3	2–1	0–3	0–3	4–2	1–2	0–3	2–1	1–2	1–2	0–3	1–2	1–2	2–1
San Diego	2–1	0–3	2–1	2–1	3–0	1–2	1–2	2–1	2–1	1–2	1–2	1–5	0–3	2–1	0–3
San Francisco	5–1	2–1	2–1	1–2	1–2	0–3	3–0	1–2	1–2	0–3	2–1	3–0	1–2	2–1	0–3
St. Louis	2–1	2–1	0–3	3–0	3–0	1–2	2–1	3–3	1–2	3–0	0–3	0–3	1–2	1–2	0–3
Washington	1–2	5–1	0–3	1–2	1–2	2–1	1–2	1–2	2–1	2–1	0–3	2–1	0–3	1–2	0–3

Updated with the results of all games through September 28, 2025.

== Postseason ==
=== Game log ===
2025 Postseason Game Log: 1–2 (Home: 0–0; Away: 1–2)
NL Wild Card Series: 1–2 (Home: 0–0; Away: 1–2)

#	Date	Opponent	Score	Win	Loss	Save	Attendance	Series
1	September 30	@ Cubs	1–3	Palencia (1–0)	Pivetta (0–1)	Keller (1)	39,114	0–1
2	October 1	@ Cubs	3–0	Morejón (1–0)	Kittredge (0–1)	Suárez (1)	41,083	1–1
3	October 2	@ Cubs	1–3	Palencia (2–0)	Darvish (0–1)	Kittredge (1)	40,895	1–2

=== Postseason rosters ===
Playoff rosters
National League Wild Card Series

- Pitchers: 11 Yu Darvish 22 Mason Miller 27 Nick Pivetta 34 Michael King 50 Adrián Morejón 56 Jeremiah Estrada 58 Wandy Peralta 66 David Morgan 72 Bradgley Rodríguez 75 Robert Suárez 84 Dylan Cease 98 Randy Vásquez
- Catchers: 12 Luis Campusano 15 Martín Maldonado 54 Freddy Fermín
- Infielders: 2 Xander Bogaerts 4 Luis Arráez 7 José Iglesias 9 Jake Cronenworth 13 Manny Machado 18 Mason McCoy 32 Ryan O'Hearn
- Outfielders: 3 Jackson Merrill 23 Fernando Tatís Jr. 29 Bryce Johnson 30 Gavin Sheets

== Roster ==
2025 San Diego Padres
Roster
Pitchers: 40 Jason Adam; 38 Ryan Bergert; 84 Dylan Cease; 65 Nestor Cortes; 60 Omar Cruz; 11 Yu Darvish; 56 Jeremiah Estrada; 71 Logan Gillaspie; 68 Kyle Hart; 78 Bryan Hoeing; 37 Alek Jacob; 34 Michael King; 32 Stephen Kolek; 97 Ron Marinaccio; 1 Yuki Matsui; 22 Mason Miller; 50 Adrián Morejón; 66 David Morgan; 79 Eduarniel Núñez; 58 Wandy Peralta; 27 Nick Pivetta; 25 Sean Reynolds; 72 Bradgley Rodríguez; 38 JP Sears; 75 Robert Suárez; 98 Randy Vásquez; 61 Matt Waldron	Catchers: 12 Luis Campusano; 17 Elías Díaz; 54 Freddy Fermín; 15 Martín Maldonado; Infielders: 4 Luis Arráez; 2 Xander Bogaerts; 9 Jake Cronenworth; 10 Yuli Gurriel; 7 Jose Iglesias; 13 Manny Machado; 18 Mason McCoy; 32 Ryan O'Hearn; 24 Will Wagner	Outfielders: 41 Trenton Brooks; 39 Oscar González; 22 Jason Heyward; 24 Connor Joe; 29 Bryce Johnson; 5 Ramón Laureano; 28 Brandon Lockridge; 3 Jackson Merrill; 21 Tirso Ornelas; 30 Gavin Sheets; 23 Fernando Tatís Jr.; 14 Tyler Wade	Manager: 8 Mike Shildt; Coaches: 86 Heberto Andrade (bullpen catcher/coaching assistant); -- Chris Apecechea (assistant pitching); 81 Morgan Burkhart (major league coaching assistant); 82 Brian Esposito (bench); 53 Ben Fritz (bullpen); 70 Robby Hammock (field coordinator); 33 Tim Leiper (third base/infield and base running instructor); 46 David Macias (first base/outfield and base running instructor); 89 Mike McCoy (assistant hitting); 57 Ruben Niebla (pitching); 85 Pat O'Sullivan (assistant hitting); 80 Nick Punto (major league coach); 47 Vic Rodriguez (hitting); 87 Scott Stroud (coaching assistant); 83 Peter Summerville (game planning/coaching assistant)

== Player stats ==
= Indicates team leader

= Indicates league leader

=== Batting ===
Note: G = Games played; AB = At bats; R = Runs scored; H = Hits; 2B = Doubles; 3B = Triples; HR = Home runs; RBI = Runs batted in; SB = Stolen bases; BB = Walks; AVG = Batting average; SLG = Slugging average

Player	G	AB	R	H	2B	3B	HR	RBI	SB	BB	AVG	SLG
Luis Arráez	154	620	66	181	30	4	8	61	11	34	.292	.392
Manny Machado	159	615	91	169	33	0	27	95	14	55	.275	.460
Fernando Tatís Jr.	155	594	111	159	27	2	25	71	32	89	.268	.446
Gavin Sheets	145	492	57	124	28	1	19	71	2	44	.252	.429
Xander Bogaerts	136	491	63	129	30	0	11	53	20	48	.263	.391
Jackson Merrill	115	440	59	116	25	6	16	67	1	33	.264	.457
Jake Cronenworth	135	419	61	103	20	1	11	59	3	69	.246	.377
Jose Iglesias	112	306	29	70	11	0	3	36	5	24	.229	.294
Elías Díaz	106	255	34	52	7	0	9	29	0	21	.204	.337
Ramón Laureano	50	182	27	49	9	2	9	30	3	13	.269	.489
Ryan O'Hearn	50	163	22	45	6	0	4	20	0	16	.276	.387
Martín Maldonado	64	147	11	30	6	0	4	12	0	8	.204	.327
Freddy Fermin	42	127	15	31	6	0	2	14	0	6	.244	.339
Tyler Wade	59	107	13	22	1	2	0	9	1	15	.206	.252
Brandon Lockridge	47	88	9	19	4	0	0	5	8	4	.216	.261
Jason Heyward	34	85	9	15	2	0	2	12	0	6	.176	.271
Bryce Johnson	55	76	9	26	4	0	1	8	4	3	.342	.434
Oscar González	21	59	2	13	1	0	0	4	0	2	.220	.237
Trenton Brooks	25	41	5	6	2	0	1	2	0	2	.146	.268
Yuli Gurriel	16	36	2	4	1	0	0	3	0	4	.111	.139
Mason McCoy	18	22	5	3	1	0	0	1	2	3	.136	.182
Luis Campusano	10	21	0	0	0	0	0	0	0	0	.000	.000
Will Wagner	15	15	2	2	0	0	0	0	0	2	.133	.133
Tirso Ornelas	7	14	0	1	0	0	0	1	0	2	.071	.071
Connor Joe	7	9	0	0	0	0	0	0	0	1	.000	.000
Totals	162	5424	702	1369	254	18	152	663	106	510	.252	.390

Source:Baseball Reference

=== Pitching ===
Note: W = Wins; L = Losses; ERA = Earned run average; G = Games pitched; GS = Games started; SV = Saves; IP = Innings pitched; H = Hits allowed; R = Runs allowed; ER = Earned runs allowed; BB = Walks allowed; SO = Strikeouts

Player	W	L	ERA	G	GS	SV	IP	H	R	ER	BB	SO
Nick Pivetta	13	5	2.87	31	31	0	181.2	129	63	58	50	190
Dylan Cease	8	12	4.55	32	32	0	168.0	152	91	85	71	215
Randy Vásquez	6	7	3.84	28	26	0	133.2	125	59	57	52	78
Stephen Kolek	4	5	4.18	14	14	0	79.2	78	40	37	26	56
Adrián Morejón	13	6	2.08	75	0	3	73.2	49	23	17	17	70
Michael King	5	3	3.44	15	15	0	73.1	62	31	28	26	76
Jeremiah Estrada	4	5	3.45	77	0	3	73.0	58	31	28	27	108
Yu Darvish	5	5	5.38	15	15	0	72.0	66	44	43	19	68
Wandy Peralta	6	1	3.14	71	1	0	71.2	66	29	25	30	63
Robert Suárez	4	6	2.97	70	0	40	69.2	47	24	23	16	75
Jason Adam	8	4	1.93	65	0	0	65.1	50	18	14	25	70
Yuki Matsui	3	1	3.98	61	0	1	63.1	53	29	28	33	61
David Morgan	1	2	2.66	41	2	0	47.1	35	14	14	23	50
Kyle Hart	3	3	5.86	20	6	0	43.0	38	28	28	13	37
Ryan Bergert	1	0	2.78	11	7	0	35.2	24	11	11	18	34
Alek Jacob	1	0	5.13	29	0	0	33.1	36	20	19	14	23
Sean Reynolds	0	1	5.33	19	1	0	27.0	20	16	16	17	25
Nestor Cortes	1	3	5.47	6	6	0	26.1	29	16	16	13	21
JP Sears	2	2	5.47	5	5	0	24.2	31	16	15	7	20
Mason Miller	0	0	0.77	22	0	2	23.1	7	2	2	10	45
Ron Marinaccio	0	0	0.84	7	0	0	10.2	6	1	1	4	12
Bryan Hoeing	1	0	3.38	7	0	0	8.0	9	3	3	3	5
Bradgley Rodríguez	1	0	1.17	7	0	0	7.2	4	1	1	3	9
Logan Gillaspie	0	0	2.57	3	0	0	7.0	7	2	2	4	4
Matt Waldron	0	1	7.71	1	1	0	4.2	6	4	4	6	3
Eduarniel Núñez	0	0	3.86	4	0	0	4.2	4	2	2	4	2
Omar Cruz	0	0	4.91	2	0	0	3.2	4	2	2	3	5
Tyler Wade	0	0	9.00	1	0	0	1.0	2	1	1	1	0
Totals	90	72	3.64	162	162	49	1433.0	1197	621	580	535	1425

Source:Baseball Reference

== Farm system ==
Level	Team	League	Manager	W	L	Position
Triple-A	El Paso Chihuahuas	Pacific Coast League	Pete Zamora	27	15	1st (East Division)
Double-A	San Antonio Missions	Texas League	Luke Montz	16	27	5th (South Division)
High-A	Fort Wayne TinCaps	Midwest League	Mike Daly	21	26	5th (East Division)
Low-A	Lake Elsinore Storm	California League	Brian Burres	22	24	2nd (South Division)
Rookie	ACL Padres	Arizona Complex League	Jhonaldo Pozo	14	46	5th (West Division)
Rookie	DSL Padres Gold	Dominican Summer League	Brallan Perez	37	17	1st (Northwest Division); 1st half winner
Rookie	DSL Padres Brown	Dominican Summer League	Diego Cedeno	19	34	6th (West Division)

Updated with the results of all games through August 16, 2025.
