= 2025 Kansas City Royals season =

2025 Kansas City Royals
- League: American League
- Division: Central
- Ballpark: Kauffman Stadium
- City: Kansas City, Missouri
- Record: 82–80 (.506)
- Divisional place: 3rd
- Owners: John Sherman
- General managers: J.J. Picollo
- Managers: Matt Quatraro
- Television: FanDuel Sports Network Kansas City
- Radio: KFNZ 96.5 The Fan

The 2025 Kansas City Royals season was the 57th season for the franchise, and their 53rd at Kauffman Stadium. It was also the team's third season under the management of Matt Quatraro.

The team finished the season in third place of the AL Central with a record of 82–80.

== Offseason ==
The Royals finished the 2024 season with an 86–76 record and a wild card berth. They swept the Baltimore Orioles in the 2024 American League Wild Card Series before they lost in four games to the eventual American League champion New York Yankees.

=== Transactions ===
==== October 2024 ====
- Outfielder Tommy Pham, Infielder/Outfielder Adam Frazier, Infielder/Outfielder Garrett Hampson, Pitcher Will Smith, Outfielder Robbie Grossman, 1st baseman Yuli Gurriel, Pitcher Michael Lorenzen and Infielder Paul DeJong elected free agency.

==== November 2024 ====
- Signed pitcher Michael Wacha to a 3-year contract extension.
- Acquired 2nd baseman Jonathan India and Outfielder Joey Wiemer from the Cincinnati Reds in exchange for Pitcher Brady Singer.

==== January 2025 ====
- Signed pitcher Michael Lorenzen to a 1-year contract.
- Signed pitcher Carlos Estévez to a 2-year contract.

== Regular season ==
=== American League Central ===
AL Central
Team	W	L	Pct.	GB	Home	Road
Cleveland Guardians	88	74	.543	—	45‍–‍36	43‍–‍38
Detroit Tigers	87	75	.537	1	46‍–‍35	41‍–‍40
Kansas City Royals	82	80	.506	6	43‍–‍38	39‍–‍42
Minnesota Twins	70	92	.432	18	38‍–‍43	32‍–‍49
Chicago White Sox	60	102	.370	28	33‍–‍48	27‍–‍54

=== American League Wild Card ===
Division leaders
Team	W	L	Pct.
Toronto Blue Jays	94	68	.580
Seattle Mariners	90	72	.556
Cleveland Guardians	88	74	.543

Wild Card teams (Top 3 teams qualify for postseason)
Team	W	L	Pct.	GB
New York Yankees	94	68	.580	+7
Boston Red Sox	89	73	.549	+2
Detroit Tigers	87	75	.537	—
Houston Astros	87	75	.537	—
Kansas City Royals	82	80	.506	5
Texas Rangers	81	81	.500	6
Tampa Bay Rays	77	85	.475	10
Athletics	76	86	.469	11
Baltimore Orioles	75	87	.463	12
Los Angeles Angels	72	90	.444	15
Minnesota Twins	70	92	.432	17
Chicago White Sox	60	102	.370	27

=== Record vs. opponents ===
==== Record vs. American League ====
2025 American League record Source: MLB Standings Grid – 2025
Team	ATH	BAL	BOS	CWS	CLE	DET	HOU	KC	LAA	MIN	NYY	SEA	TB	TEX	TOR	NL
Athletics	—	4–2	3–3	5–1	2–4	4–2	8–5	4–2	4–9	4–3	2–4	6–7	3–3	5–8	2–5	20–28
Baltimore	2–4	—	5–8	6–0	3–4	1–5	3–4	2–4	5–1	0–6	4–9	5–1	7–6	2–4	6–7	24–24
Boston	3–3	8–5	—	4–3	4–2	2–4	4–2	4–2	1–5	3–3	9–4	3–3	10–3	3–4	5–8	26–22
Chicago	1–5	0–6	3–4	—	2–11	5–8	3–3	3–10	3–3	8–5	1–6	1–5	4–2	2–4	3–3	21–27
Cleveland	4–2	4–3	2–4	11–2	—	8–5	4–2	8–5	3–3	9–4	3–3	2–4	5–2	2–4	3–3	20–28
Detroit	2–4	5–1	4–2	8–5	5–8	—	4–2	9–4	5–2	8–5	4–2	2–4	3–3	2–4	3–4	23–25
Houston	5–8	4–3	2–4	3–3	2–4	2–4	—	3–3	8–5	5–1	3-3	5–8	3–4	7–6	4–2	31–17
Kansas City	2–4	4–2	2–4	10–3	5–8	4–9	3–3	—	3–3	7–6	0–6	3–4	3–3	6-1	4–2	26–22
Los Angeles	9–4	1–5	5–1	3–3	3–3	2–5	5–8	3–3	—	2–4	3–4	4–9	3–3	5–8	2–4	22–26
Minnesota	3–4	6–0	3–3	5–8	4–9	5–8	1–5	6–7	4–2	—	2–4	3–4	3–3	3–3	2–4	20–28
New York	4–2	9–4	4–9	6–1	3–3	2–4	3–3	6–0	4–3	4–2	—	5–1	9–4	4–2	5–8	26–22
Seattle	7–6	1–5	3–3	5–1	4–2	4–2	8–5	4–3	9–4	4–3	1–5	—	3–3	10–3	2–4	25–23
Tampa Bay	3–3	6–7	3–10	2–4	2–5	3–3	4–3	3–3	3–3	3–3	4–9	3–3	—	3–3	7–6	28–20
Texas	8–5	4–2	4–3	4–2	4–2	4–2	6–7	1-6	8–5	3–3	2–4	3–10	3–3	—	2–4	25–23
Toronto	5–2	7–6	8–5	3–3	3–3	4–3	2–4	2–4	4–2	4–2	8–5	4–2	6–7	4–2	—	30–18

Updated with the results of all games through September 28, 2025.

==== Record vs. National League ====
2025 American League record vs. National League Source: MLB Standings
Team	AZ	ATL	CHC	CIN	COL	LAD	MIA	MIL	NYM	PHI	PIT	SD	SF	STL	WSH
Athletics	1–2	2–1	0–3	3–0	2–1	1–2	2–1	1–2	1–2	1–2	1–2	1–2	1–5	1–2	2–1
Baltimore	1–2	3–0	1–2	1–2	2–1	2–1	1–2	1–2	2–1	1–2	3–0	3–0	1–2	1–2	1–5
Boston	1–2	3–3	1–2	2–1	3–0	2–1	2–1	0–3	2–1	1–2	1–2	1–2	1–2	3–0	3–0
Chicago	1–2	1–2	1–5	2–1	2–1	0–3	2–1	1–2	1–2	2–1	3–0	1–2	2–1	0–3	2–1
Cleveland	1–2	0–3	0–3	1–5	2–1	1–2	2–1	2–1	3–0	1–2	3–0	0–3	2–1	0–3	2–1
Detroit	3–0	0–3	2–1	1–2	3–0	0–3	1–2	1–2	1–2	1–2	2–4	2–1	3–0	2–1	1–2
Houston	3–0	2–1	2–1	2–1	4–2	3–0	2–1	1–2	2–1	3–0	2–1	2–1	0–3	1–2	2–1
Kansas City	2–1	2–1	2–1	1–2	3–0	1–2	1–2	1–2	1–2	1–2	3–0	1–2	2–1	3–3	2–1
Los Angeles	2–1	2–1	0–3	1–2	1–2	6–0	1–2	0–3	0–3	2–1	1–2	1–2	2–1	2–1	1–2
Minnesota	1–2	0–3	2–1	1–2	1–2	1–2	1–2	2–4	2–1	1–2	2–1	2–1	3–0	0–3	1–2
New York	1–2	2–1	1–2	1–2	2–1	1–2	0–3	3–0	3–3	1–2	2–1	2–1	1–2	3–0	3–0
Seattle	0–3	2–1	2–1	2–1	3–0	0–3	2–1	1–2	1–2	0–3	3–0	5–1	0–3	3–0	1–2
Tampa Bay	2–1	2–1	1–2	0–3	2–1	1–2	3–3	2–1	3–0	0–3	2–1	3–0	2–1	2–1	3–0
Texas	2–4	3–0	1–2	2–1	3–0	1–2	0–3	3–0	2–1	0–3	2–1	1–2	1–2	2–1	2–1
Toronto	2–1	2–1	2–1	2–1	3–0	1–2	2–1	1–2	0–3	2–4	1–2	3–0	3–0	3–0	3–0

Updated with the results of all games through September 28, 2025.

=== Game log ===
Legend
Royals Win	Royals Loss	Game postponed	Eliminated from playoff spot

2025 Game Log: 82–80 (Home: 43–38; Away: 39–42)
March/April: 16–15 (Home: 11–5; Away: 5–10)

#	Date	Opponent	Score	Win	Loss	Save	Attendance	Record	Streak
1	March 27	Guardians	4–7 (10)	Clase (1–0)	Long (0–1)	Sewald (1)	39,393	0–1	L1
2	March 29	Guardians	4–3	Lynch IV (1–0)	Sewald (0–1)	Estévez (1)	22,015	1–1	W1
3	March 30	Guardians	2–6	Bibee (1–0)	Wacha (0–1)	—	15,414	1–2	L1
4	March 31	@ Brewers	11–1	Bubic (1–0)	Rodríguez (0–1)	—	41,922	2–2	W1
5	April 1	@ Brewers	0–5	Uribe (1–0)	Lorenzen (0–1)	—	18,008	2–3	L1
6	April 2	@ Brewers	2–3 (11)	Koenig (1–0)	Long (0–2)	—	19,112	2–4	L2
7	April 4	Orioles	8–2	Lugo (1–0)	Kremer (1–1)	—	14,196	3–4	W1
8	April 5	Orioles	1–8	Sugano (1–1)	Wacha (0–2)	28,875	14,383	3–5	L1
9	April 6	Orioles	4–1	Bubic (2–0)	Povich (0–1)	Estévez (2)	19,100	4–5	W1
10	April 7	Twins	4–2	Lorenzen (1–1)	Woods Richardson (0–1)	Estévez (3)	12,041	5–5	W2
11	April 8	Twins	2–1	Schreiber (1–0)	Jax (0–1)	Lynch IV (1)	13,008	6–5	W3
12	April 9	Twins	0–4	Ryan (1–1)	Lugo (1–1)	—	13,156	6–6	L1
13	April 10	Twins	3–2	Lynch IV (2–0)	Sands (1–1)	Estévez (4)	14,730	7–6	W1
14	April 11	@ Guardians	0–7	Herrin (2–0)	Bubic (2–1)	—	15,430	7–7	L1
15	April 12	@ Guardians	3–6	Ortiz (1–2)	Lorenzen (1–2)	—	20,256	7–8	L2
16	April 13	@ Guardians	4–2	Ragans (1–0)	Lively (0–2)	Estévez (5)	17,864	8–8	W1
17	April 14	@ Yankees	1–4	Carrasco (2–1)	Lugo (1–2)	Williams (2)	42,648	8–9	L1
18	April 15	@ Yankees	2–4	Fried (3–0)	Wacha (0–3)	Williams (3)	43,601	8–10	L2
19	April 16	@ Yankees	3–4	Leiter Jr. (2–1)	Schreiber (1–1)	Cruz (1)	43,720	8–11	L3
20	April 17	@ Tigers	1–6	Olson (2–1)	Lorenzen (1–3)	Kahnle (3)	15,769	8–12	L4
21	April 18	@ Tigers	3–7	Jobe (2–0)	Ragans (1–1)	Kahnle (4)	25,754	8–13	L5
22	April 19	@ Tigers	1–3	Mize (3–1)	Lugo (1–3)	Vest (1)	32,043	8–14	L6
23	April 20	@ Tigers	4–3 (10)	Estévez (1–0)	Holton (1–2)	—	17,712	9–14	W1
24	April 22	Rockies	4–3 (11)	Lynch IV (3–0)	Kinley (0–1)	—	14,567	10–14	W2
―	April 23	Rockies	Postponed (rain); Makeup: April 24						
25	April 24 (1)	Rockies	7–4	Zerpa (1–0)	Márquez (0–4)	Estévez (6)	see 2nd game	11–14	W3
26	April 24 (1)	Rockies	6–2	Lorenzen (2–3)	Dollander (1–3)	—	15,601	12–14	W4
27	April 25	Astros	2–0	Lugo (2–3)	Wesneski (1–2)	Erceg (1)	19,003	13–14	W5
28	April 26	Astros	2–0	Wacha (1–3)	Valdez (1–3)	Estévez (7)	25,378	14–14	W6
29	April 27	Astros	3–7	Brown (4–1)	Bubic (2–2)	—	21,171	14–15	L1
30	April 29	@ Rays	3–1	Lorenzen (3–3)	Bradley (2–2)	Estévez (8)	10,046	15–15	W1
31	April 30	@ Rays	3–0	Cameron (1–0)	Rasmussen (1–2)	Estévez (9)	10,046	16–15	W2

May: 15–13 (Home: 8–6; Away: 7–7)

#	Date	Opponent	Score	Win	Loss	Save	Attendance	Record	Streak
32	May 1	@ Rays	8–2	Lugo (3–3)	Baz (3–1)	—	8,794	17–15	W3
33	May 2	@ Orioles	0–3	Kremer (3–4)	Wacha (1–4)	Bautista (6)	26,364	17–16	L1
34	May 3	@ Orioles	4–0	Bubic (3–2)	Sugano (3–2)	—	19,348	18–16	W1
35	May 4	@ Orioles	11–6	Zerpa (2–0)	Canó (0–1)	—	31,956	19–16	W2
36	May 5	White Sox	3–0	Ragans (2–1)	Smith (1–2)	Estévez (10)	12,529	20–16	W3
37	May 6	White Sox	4–3	Clarke (1–0)	Booser (0–3)	—	15,968	21–16	W4
38	May 7	White Sox	2–1	Wacha (2–4)	Cannon (2–4)	Estévez (11)	12,328	22–16	W5
39	May 8	White Sox	10–0	Bubic (4–2)	Martin (1–4)	—	25,386	23–16	W6
40	May 9	Red Sox	2–1 (12)	Cruz (1–0)	Newcomb (0–4)	—	30,348	24–16	W7
41	May 10	Red Sox	1–10	Crochet (4–2)	Ragans (2–2)	—	29,460	24–17	L1
42	May 11	Red Sox	1–3	Giolito (1–1)	Lugo (3–4)	Chapman (6)	25,785	24–18	L2
43	May 12	@ Astros	7–5	Wacha (3–4)	Gusto (3–2)	Estévez (12)	26,386	25–18	W1
44	May 13	@ Astros	1–2	Abreu (1–1)	Schreiber (1–2)	—	27,114	25–19	L1
45	May 14	@ Astros	3–4	King (1–0)	Lorenzen (3–4)	Hader (10)	24,641	25–20	L2
46	May 16	Cardinals	3–10	Pallante (4–2)	Ragans (2–3)	—	28,104	25–21	L3
47	May 17	Cardinals	0–1	Mikolas (3–2)	Cameron (1–1)	Helsley (9)	36,139	25–22	L4
48	May 18	Cardinals	2–1	Erceg (1–0)	Roycroft (1–3)	Estévez (13)	25,695	26–22	W1
49	May 19	@ Giants	3–1	Bubic (5–2)	Rogers (2–2)	Estévez (14)	28,432	27–22	W2
50	May 20	@ Giants	2–3	Birdsong (2–0)	Lorenzen (3–5)	Walker (9)	32,118	27–23	L1
51	May 21	@ Giants	8–4	Bowlan (1–0)	Webb (5–4)	—	29,064	28–23	W1
52	May 23	@ Twins	1–3	Sands (3–1)	Erceg (1–1)	—	22,391	28–24	L1
53	May 24	@ Twins	4–5	Durán (3–0)	Lynch IV (3–1)	—	30,720	28–25	L2
54	May 25	@ Twins	2–1 (10)	Estévez (2–0)	Durán (3–1)	Clarke (1)	32,501	29–25	W1
55	May 26	Reds	4–7	Martinez (3–5)	Lorenzen (3–6)	—	18,002	29–26	L1
56	May 27	Reds	2–7	Singer (6–3)	Clarke (1–1)	—	17,383	29–27	L2
57	May 28	Reds	3–2	Cameron (2–1)	Greene (4–3)	Estévez (15)	15,430	30–27	W1
58	May 30	Tigers	5–7	Hurter (1–0)	Lugo (3–5)	Vest (8)	28,875	30–28	L1
59	May 31	Tigers	1–0	Schreiber (2–2)	Brieske (1–2)	Estévez (16)	35,005	31–28	W1

June: 8–18 (Home: 1–12; Away: 7–6)

#	Date	Opponent	Score	Win	Loss	Save	Attendance	Record	Streak
60	June 1	Tigers	0–1	Lee (2–0)	Bubic (5–3)	Vest (9)	24,474	31–29	L1
61	June 3	@ Cardinals	10–7	Cruz (2–0)	Matz (3–2)	Estévez (17)	26,656	32–29	W1
―	June 4	@ Cardinals	Postponed (rain); Makeup: June 5						
62	June 5 (1)	@ Cardinals	5–6 (10)	Romero (2–3)	Estévez (2–1)	—	21,657	32–30	L1
63	June 5 (2)	@ Cardinals	7–5	Zerpa (3–0)	Liberatore (3–5)	Estévez (18)	31,038	33–30	W1
64	June 6	@ White Sox	2–7	Leasure (1–4)	Bowlan (1–1)	—	36,916	33–31	L1
65	June 7	@ White Sox	1–4	Houser (2–1)	Wacha (3–5)	Altavilla (1)	19,099	33–32	L2
66	June 8	@ White Sox	7–5	Lorenzen (4–6)	Alexander (3–6)	Estévez (19)	22,137	34–32	W1
67	June 10	Yankees	2–10	Fried (9–1)	Cameron (2–2)	—	30,017	34–33	L1
68	June 11	Yankees	3–6	Schmidt (3–3)	Bubic (5–4)	Williams (8)	21,182	34–34	L2
69	June 12	Yankees	0–1	Leiter Jr. (4–3)	Erceg (1–2)	Williams (9)	23,412	34–35	L3
70	June 13	Athletics	4–6	Severino (2–6)	Wacha (3–6)	—	29,586	34–36	L4
71	June 14	Athletics	0–4	Lopez (1–4)	Lorenzen (4–7)	—	29,034	34–37	L5
72	June 15	Athletics	2–3	Ferguson (2–2)	Estévez (2–2)	Miller (14)	27,272	34–38	L6
73	June 17	@ Rangers	6–1	Lugo (4–5)	Leiter (4–4)	—	34,408	35–38	W1
74	June 18	@ Rangers	6–3	Bubic (6–4)	Corbin (4–6)	Estévez (20)	26,520	36–38	W2
75	June 19	@ Rangers	4–1	Wacha (4–6)	Armstrong (2–2)	Estévez (21)	37,308	37–38	W3
76	June 20	@ Padres	6–5	Erceg (2–2)	Adam (5–3)	Estévez (22)	43,574	38–38	W4
77	June 21	@ Padres	1–5	Cease (3–6)	Cameron (2–3)	—	43,241	38–39	L1
78	June 22	@ Padres	2–3	Suárez (2–3)	Lynch IV (3–2)	—	43,567	38–40	L2
79	June 24	Rays	1–5	Bradley (5–5)	Bubic (6–5)	—	22,951	38–41	L3
80	June 25	Rays	0–3	Rasmussen (7–5)	Wacha (4–7)	Fairbanks (14)	20,649	38–42	L4
81	June 26	Rays	0–4	Baz (8–3)	Lorenzen (4–8)	Fairbanks (15)	19,619	38–43	L5
82	June 27	Dodgers	4–5	Trivino (3–0)	Cameron (2–4)	Scott (18)	35,187	38–44	L6
83	June 28	Dodgers	9–5	Lugo (5–5)	Casparius (6–2)	—	36,578	39–44	W1
84	June 29	Dodgers	1–5	Wrobleski (4–2)	Bubic (6–6)	—	28,671	39–45	L1
85	June 30	@ Mariners	2–6	Kirby (2–4)	Wacha (4–8)	—	27,309	39–46	L2

July: 15–9 (Home: 8–4; Away: 7–5)

#	Date	Opponent	Score	Win	Loss	Save	Attendance	Record	Streak
86	July 1	@ Mariners	6–3	Erceg (3–2)	Hancock (3–5)	Estévez (23)	22,351	40–46	W1
87	July 2	@ Mariners	2–3	Vargas (3–5)	Zerpa (3–1)	Muñoz (19)	24,752	40–47	L1
88	July 3	@ Mariners	3–2	Lugo (6–5)	Legumina (4–4)	Estévez (24)	38,030	41–47	W1
89	July 4	@ Diamondbacks	9–3	Bubic (7–6)	Rodríguez (3–5)	—	35,562	42–47	W2
90	July 5	@ Diamondbacks	1–7	Nelson (5–2)	Wacha (4–9)	—	26,043	42–48	L1
91	July 6	@ Diamondbacks	4–0	Lorenzen (5–8)	DeSclafani (0–1)	—	22,949	43–48	W1
92	July 7	Pirates	9–3	Cameron (3–4)	Heaney (4–8)	—	18,614	44–48	W2
93	July 8	Pirates	4–3	Estévez (3–2)	Santana (2–2)	—	22,855	45–48	W3
94	July 9	Pirates	4–3	Erceg (4–2)	Mattson (2–1)	Estévez (25)	18,398	46–48	W4
95	July 11	Mets	3–8	Brazobán (5–2)	Cruz (2–1)	—	28,268	46–49	L1
96	July 12	Mets	1–3	Montas (2–1)	Bowlan (1–2)	Díaz (19)	24,620	46–50	L2
97	July 13	Mets	3–2	Estévez (4–2)	Manaea (0–1)	—	22,121	47–50	W1
95th All-Star Game in Cumberland, Georgia
98	July 18	@ Marlins	7–8 (10)	Bachar (5–0)	Estévez (4–3)	—	14,442	47–51	L1
99	July 19	@ Marlins	1–3	Henriquez (6–1)	Erceg (4–3)	Bender (3)	14,292	47–52	L2
100	July 20	@ Marlins	7–4	Bubic (8–6)	Junk (4–2)	Estévez (26)	18,219	48–52	W1
101	July 21	@ Cubs	12–4	Cameron (4–4)	Brown (4–7)	—	38,117	49–52	W2
102	July 22	@ Cubs	0–6	Boyd (11–3)	Hill (0–1)	—	40,092	49–53	L1
103	July 23	@ Cubs	8–4	Lugo (7–5)	Rea (8–4)	—	38,624	50–53	W1
―	July 25	Guardians	Postponed (rain); Makeup: July 26						
104	July 26 (1)	Guardians	5–3 (10)	Cruz (3–1)	Clase (5–3)	—	21,801	51–53	W2
105	July 26 (2)	Guardians	4–6	Bibee (7–9)	Bubic (8–7)	Clase (24)	25,278	51–54	L1
106	July 27	Guardians	4–1	Cameron (5–4)	Cantillo (2–1)	Estévez (27)	16,590	52–54	W1
107	July 28	Braves	7–10	Strider (5–8)	Hill (0–2)	Iglesias (12)	23,850	52–55	L1
108	July 29	Braves	9–6	Lugo (8–5)	Fedde (3–11)	Estévez (28)	22,562	53–55	W1
109	July 30	Braves	1–0 (10)	Long (1–2)	Hernández (4–2)	—	17,726	54–55	W2

August: 16–12 (Home: 9–4; Away: 7–8)

#	Date	Opponent	Score	Win	Loss	Save	Attendance	Record	Streak
110	August 1	@ Blue Jays	9–3	Wacha (5–9)	Gausman (7–8)	—	41,492	55–55	W3
111	August 2	@ Blue Jays	2–4	Scherzer (2–1)	Cameron (5–5)	Hoffman (26)	41,842	55–56	L1
112	August 3	@ Blue Jays	7–4 (10)	Harvey (1–0)	Domínguez (2–4)	—	41,461	56–56	W1
113	August 4	@ Red Sox	5–8	Bello (8–5)	Falter (7–6)	Chapman (21)	37,585	56–57	L1
114	August 5	@ Red Sox	2–6	Crochet (13–4)	Bergert (1–1)	—	37,013	56–58	L2
115	August 6	@ Red Sox	7–3	Wacha (6–9)	May (6–8)	—	37,012	57–58	W1
116	August 8	@ Twins	4–9	Ryan (11–5)	Lugo (8–6)	—	28,242	57–59	L1
117	August 9	@ Twins	2–0	Cameron (6–5)	Ober (4–7)	Estévez (29)	22,539	58–59	W1
118	August 10	@ Twins	3–5 (11)	Tonkin (1–0)	Estévez (4–4)	—	26,746	58–60	L1
119	August 11	Nationals	7–4	Lynch IV (4–2)	Rutledge (1–2)	Estévez (30)	17,568	59–60	W1
120	August 12	Nationals	8–5	Wacha (7–9)	Parker (7–13)	Erceg (2)	19,333	60–60	W2
121	August 13	Nationals	7–8	Ferrer (4–3)	Estévez (4–5)	―	13,669	60–61	L1
122	August 15	White Sox	3–1	Cameron (7–5)	Civale (3–8)	Estévez (31)	20,829	61–61	W1
123	August 16	White Sox	6–2	Lynch IV (5–2)	Burke (4–10)	—	28,355	62–61	W2
124	August 17	White Sox	6–2	Erceg (5–3)	Taylor (0–3)	—	15,144	63–61	W3
125	August 18	Rangers	4–3	Wacha (8–9)	Leiter (7–7)	Estévez (32)	12,747	64–61	W4
126	August 19	Rangers	5–2	Zerpa (4–1)	Milner (1–3)	Schreiber (1)	14,176	65–61	W5
127	August 20	Rangers	3–6	Milner (2–3)	Long (1–3)	—	14,312	65–62	L1
128	August 21	Rangers	6–4	Zerpa (5–1)	Webb (4–4)	Estévez (33)	13,527	66–62	W1
129	August 22	@ Tigers	5–7	Finnegan (3–4)	Falter (7–7)	—	33,467	66–63	L1
130	August 23	@ Tigers	2–4	Paddack (5–11)	Wacha (8–10)	Vest (19)	37,709	66–64	L2
131	August 24	@ Tigers	10–8	Schreiber (3–2)	Flaherty (7–13)	Estévez (34)	31,538	67–64	W1
132	August 25	@ White Sox	0–7	Smith (4–7)	Cameron (7–6)	—	10,444	67–65	L1
133	August 26	@ White Sox	5–4	Long (2–3)	Taylor (0–4)	Estévez (35)	10,907	68–65	W1
134	August 27	@ White Sox	12–1	Bergert (2–1)	Civale (3–9)	—	10,598	69–65	W2
135	August 29	Tigers	3–5	Finnegan (4–4)	Lugo (8–7)	Vest (20)	34,494	69–66	L1
136	August 30	Tigers	3–1	Erceg (6–3)	Holton (5–4)	Estévez (36)	26,237	70–66	W1
137	August 31	Tigers	0–5	Skubal (12–4)	Wacha (8–11)	—	23,689	70–67	L1

September: 12–13 (Home: 6–6; Away: 6–7)

#	Date	Opponent	Score	Win	Loss	Save	Attendance	Record	Streak
138	September 2	Angels	1–5	Farris (1–0)	Lorenzen (5–9)	—	13,685	70–68	L2
139	September 3	Angels	3–4	Stephenson (1–0)	Erceg (6–4)	Detmers (3)	15,924	70–69	L3
140	September 4	Angels	4–3	Erceg (7–4)	Zeferjahn (6–5)	Estévez (37)	17,352	71–69	W1
141	September 5	Twins	2–1	Wacha (9–11)	López (5–4)	Estévez (38)	16,255	72–69	W2
142	September 6	Twins	11–2	Kolek (5–5)	Ryan (13–8)	—	21,771	73–69	W3
143	September 7	Twins	1–5	Ober (5–7)	Lorenzen (5–10)	Cabrera (1)	26,505	73–70	L1
144	September 8	@ Guardians	2–8	Cecconi (6–6)	Bergert (2–2)	—	15,875	73–71	L2
145	September 9	@ Guardians	0–2	Cantillo (5–3)	Cameron (7–7)	Smith (12)	15,458	73–72	L3
146	September 10	@ Guardians	4–3	Avila (1–0)	Herrin (5–4)	Estévez (39)	16,816	74–72	W1
147	September 11	@ Guardians	2–3	Festa (4–3)	Schreiber (3–3)	Smith (13)	15,962	74–73	L1
148	September 12	@ Phillies	2–8	Buehler (8–7)	Lorenzen (5–11)	—	41,089	74–74	L2
149	September 13	@ Phillies	6–8	Walker (5–8)	Zerpa (5–2)	Durán (30)	43,326	74–75	L3
150	September 14	@ Phillies	10–3	Cameron (8–7)	Nola (4–9)	—	42,513	75–75	W1
151	September 16	Mariners	5–12	Gilbert (5–6)	Wacha (9–12)	—	20,017	75–76	L1
152	September 17	Mariners	7–5	Erceg (8–4)	Brash (1–3)	Estévez (40)	19,127	76–76	W1
153	September 18	Mariners	0–2	Castillo (10–8)	Kolek (5–6)	Muñoz (36)	18,137	76–77	L1
154	September 19	Blue Jays	20–1	Lorenzen (6–11)	Scherzer (5–4)	—	26,459	77–77	W1
155	September 20	Blue Jays	2–1	Cameron (9–7)	Bieber (3–2)	Estévez (41)	25,774	78–77	W2
156	September 21	Blue Jays	5–8	Domínguez (4–4)	Wacha (9–13)	Hoffman (32)	32,936	78–78	L1
157	September 23	@ Angels	8–4	Ragans (3–3)	Aldegheri (0–1)	—	30,861	79–78	W1
158	September 24	@ Angels	2–3	Kikuchi (7–11)	Kolek (5–7)	Jansen (28)	29,266	79–79	L1
159	September 25	@ Angels	9–4	Lorenzen (7–11)	Farris (1–3)	—	35,752	80–79	W1
160	September 26	@ Athletics	3–4	Sterner (4–3)	Avila (1–1)	—	10,543	80–80	L1
161	September 27	@ Athletics	4–2	Wacha (10–13)	Morales (4–3)	Estévez (42)	10,047	81–80	W1
162	September 28	@ Athletics	9–2	Lynch IV (6–2)	Basso (1–1)	—	8,754	82–80	W2

== Roster ==
2025 Kansas City Royals
Roster
Pitchers: 58 Luinder Avila; 38 Ryan Bergert; 62 Jonathan Bowlan; 50 Kris Bubic; 65 Noah Cameron; 45 Taylor Clarke; 64 Steven Cruz; 60 Lucas Erceg; 53 Carlos Estévez; 36 Bailey Falter; 56 Hunter Harvey; 38 Thomas Hatch; 35 Rich Hill; 54 Andrew Hoffmann; 32 Stephen Kolek; 73 Sam Long; 24 Michael Lorenzen; 67 Seth Lugo; 41 Daniel Lynch IV; 55 Cole Ragans; 43 Trevor Richards; 46 John Schreiber; 47 Evan Sisk; 35 Chris Stratton; 52 Michael Wacha; 61 Ángel Zerpa	Catchers: 34 Freddy Fermín; 22 Carter Jensen; 15,17 Luke Maile; 13 Salvador Pérez; Infielders: 26 Adam Frazier; 11 Maikel García; 6 Jonathan India; 19 Michael Massey; 9 Vinnie Pasquantino; 7 Bobby Witt Jr.	Outfielders: 18 Cavan Biggio; 44 Dairon Blanco; 14 Jac Caglianone; 21 Mark Canha; 15 Randal Grichuk; 28 Kyle Isbel; 12 Nick Loftin; 1 MJ Melendez; 16,26 John Rave; 16 Hunter Renfroe; 2 Tyler Tolbert; 8 Drew Waters; 18 Mike Yastrzemski	Manager: 33 Matt Quatraro; Coaches: 68 José Alguacil (infield); 84 Zach Bove (assistant pitching); 80 Allan de San Miguel (bullpen catcher); 77 Keoni DeRenne (assistant hitting); 70 Joe Dillon (assistant hitting); 82 Miguel Garcia (coach); 83 Juan Graterol (bullpen catcher); 39 Damon Hollins (first base); 49 Paul Hoover (bench); 57 Mitch Stetter (bullpen); 85 Brian Sweeney (pitching); 25 Vance Wilson (third base); 37 Alec Zumwalt (hitting)

== Player stats ==
= Indicates team leader

= Indicates league leader

=== Batting ===
Note: G = Games played; AB = At bats; R = Runs scored; H = Hits; 2B = Doubles; 3B = Triples; HR = Home runs; RBI = Runs batted in; SB = Stolen bases; BB = Walks; AVG = Batting average; SLG = Slugging average

Player	G	AB	R	H	2B	3B	HR	RBI	SB	BB	AVG	SLG
Bobby Witt Jr.	157	623	99	184	47	6	23	88	38	49	.295	.501
Vinnie Pasquantino	160	621	72	164	33	1	32	113	1	49	.264	.475
Salvador Perez	155	597	54	141	35	0	30	100	0	28	.236	.446
Maikel García	160	595	81	170	39	5	16	74	23	62	.286	.449
Jonathan India	136	497	63	116	29	0	9	45	0	54	.233	.346
Kyle Isbel	135	368	42	94	16	4	4	33	4	23	.255	.353
Michael Massey	77	262	20	64	9	0	3	20	2	9	.244	.313
Jac Caglianone	62	210	19	33	6	1	7	18	1	18	.157	.295
Drew Waters	71	206	21	50	6	3	1	14	5	11	.243	.316
Freddy Fermin	67	192	17	49	7	0	3	12	1	13	.255	.339
Adam Frazier	56	184	21	52	10	0	4	23	1	9	.283	.402
Nick Loftin	67	168	17	35	9	2	4	20	1	14	.208	.357
Mike Yastrzemski	50	156	30	37	14	0	9	18	1	25	.237	.500
John Rave	72	153	18	30	5	0	4	14	7	18	.196	.307
Mark Canha	46	113	9	24	3	0	1	6	0	7	.212	.265
Hunter Renfroe	35	99	5	18	6	0	0	4	0	8	.182	.242
Randal Grichuk	43	97	10	20	3	0	2	5	0	7	.206	.299
Cavan Biggio	37	69	9	12	2	0	1	4	1	11	.174	.246
MJ Melendez	23	60	5	5	2	0	1	1	0	3	.083	.167
Carter Jensen	20	60	12	18	6	0	3	13	0	9	.300	.550
Tyler Tolbert	64	50	19	14	2	0	1	6	21	1	.280	.380
Luke Maile	25	45	6	11	2	0	1	6	1	7	.244	.356
Dairon Blanco	9	6	2	1	1	0	0	1	3	0	.167	.333
Totals	162	5431	651	1342	292	22	159	638	111	435	.247	.397

Source:Baseball Reference

=== Pitching ===
Note: W = Wins; L = Losses; ERA = Earned run average; G = Games pitched; GS = Games started; SV = Saves; IP = Innings pitched; H = Hits allowed; R = Runs allowed; ER = Earned runs allowed; BB = Walks allowed; SO = Strikeouts

Player	W	L	ERA	G	GS	SV	IP	H	R	ER	BB	SO
Michael Wacha	10	13	3.86	31	31	0	172.2	166	74	74	45	126
Seth Lugo	8	7	4.15	26	26	0	145.1	133	70	67	55	125
Michael Lorenzen	7	11	4.64	27	26	0	141.2	149	76	73	39	127
Noah Cameron	9	7	2.99	24	24	0	138.1	109	46	46	43	114
Kris Bubic	8	7	2.55	20	20	0	116.1	98	38	33	39	116
Daniel Lynch IV	6	2	3.06	57	2	1	67.2	66	24	23	26	45
Carlos Estévez	4	5	2.45	67	0	42	66.0	48	22	18	22	54
Angel Zerpa	5	2	4.18	69	2	0	64.2	67	30	30	22	58
John Schreiber	3	3	3.80	74	0	1	64.0	57	29	27	19	62
Cole Ragans	3	3	4.67	13	13	0	61.2	53	33	32	20	98
Lucas Erceg	8	4	2.64	61	0	2	61.1	54	19	18	18	48
Taylor Clarke	1	1	3.25	51	0	1	55.1	38	20	20	9	44
Steven Cruz	3	1	3.74	47	0	0	45.2	36	20	19	18	38
Jonathan Bowlan	1	2	3.86	34	1	0	44.1	37	21	19	17	46
Ryan Bergert	1	2	4.43	8	8	0	40.2	37	21	20	17	39
Sam Long	2	3	5.36	39	0	0	40.1	48	31	24	22	33
Stephen Kolek	1	2	1.91	5	5	0	33.0	20	9	7	5	21
Chris Stratton	0	0	7.94	12	0	0	17.0	29	17	15	8	16
Luinder Avila	1	1	1.29	13	0	0	14.0	7	2	2	6	16
Bailey Falter	0	2	11.25	4	2	0	12.0	20	15	15	7	11
Hunter Harvey	1	0	0.00	12	0	0	10.2	6	0	0	1	11
Rich Hill	0	2	5.00	2	2	0	9.0	9	7	5	8	4
Evan Sisk	0	0	1.69	5	0	0	5.1	5	1	1	5	11
Andrew Hoffman	0	0	3.86	3	0	0	4.2	7	6	2	4	5
Trevor Richards	0	0	12.00	3	0	0	3.0	7	4	4	2	2
Thomas Hatch	0	0	18.00	1	0	0	1.0	2	2	2	0	1
Luke Maile	0	0	0.00	1	0	0	1.0	0	0	0	1	0
Totals	82	80	3.73	162	162	47	1436.2	1308	637	596	478	1271

Source:Baseball Reference

== Farm system ==
Level	Team	League	Manager
Triple-A	Omaha Storm Chasers	International League	Mike Jirschele
Double-A	Northwest Arkansas Naturals	Texas League	Brooks Conrad
High-A	Quad Cities River Bandits	Midwest League	Jesus Azuaje
Single-A	Columbia Fireflies	Carolina League	David Noworyta
Rookie	ACL Royals Blue	Arizona Complex League	Omar Ramirez
Rookie	ACL Royals Gold	Arizona Complex League	Andre David
Rookie	DSL Royals	Dominican Summer League	Ramon Martínez
