= Trenton Brooks =

American baseball player (born 1995)

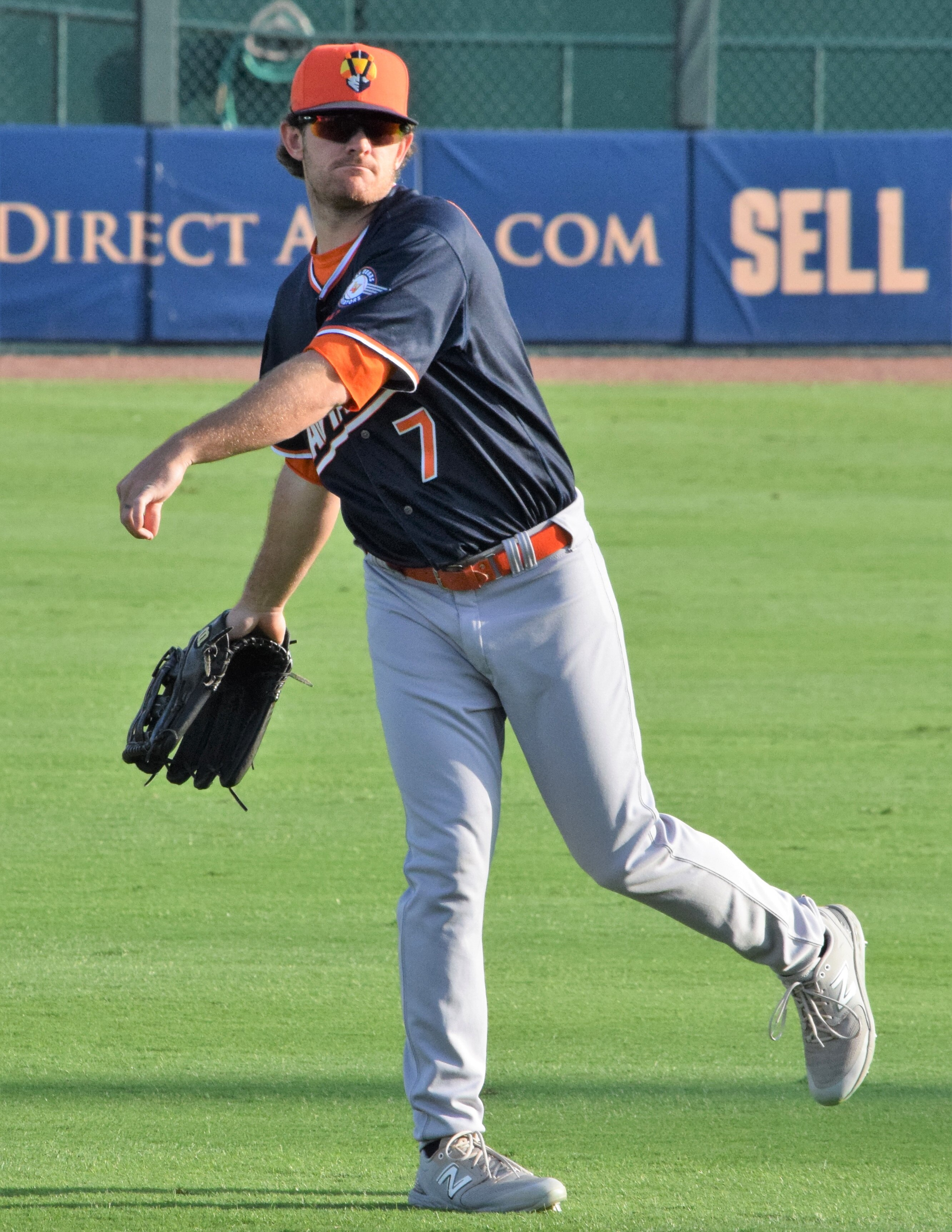
- Brooks with the Las Vegas Aviators in 2023

Free agent
- First baseman / Outfielder
- Born: July 3, 1995 (age 31); Alpine, California, U.S.
- Bats: Left Throws: Left

Professional debut
- MLB: May 28, 2024, for the San Francisco Giants
- KBO: March 28, 2026, for the Kiwoom Heroes

MLB statistics (through 2025 season)
- Batting average: .145
- Home runs: 1
- Runs batted in: 3

KBO statistics (through 2026 season)
- Batting average: .217
- Home runs: 0
- Runs batted in: 16
- Stats at Baseball Reference

Teams
- San Francisco Giants (2024); San Diego Padres (2025); Kiwoom Heroes (2026)

Trenton Brooks (born July 3, 1995) is an American professional baseball first baseman and outfielder who is a free agent. He has previously played in Major League Baseball (MLB) for the San Francisco Giants and San Diego Padres, and in the KBO League for the Kiwoom Heroes. He made his MLB debut in 2024.

== Amateur career ==
A native of Alpine, California, Brooks attended Granite Hills High School and played college baseball at the University of Nevada, Reno. In 2015, he played collegiate summer baseball with the Chatham Anglers of the Cape Cod Baseball League.

== Professional career ==
=== Cleveland Indians / Guardians ===
Brooks was drafted by the Cleveland Indians in the 17th round, with the 512th overall selection, of the 2016 Major League Baseball draft. He made his professional debut with the rookie–level Arizona League Indians, hitting .222 in 35 games.

Brooks spent the 2017 season with the Single–A Lake County Captains, also appearing in three games for the High–A Lynchburg Hillcats. In 29 games for the Captains, he batted .214/.302/.286 with one home run and eight RBI. In 2018, Brooks spent the campaign with Lynchburg, hitting .281/.362/.407 with five home runs and 52 RBI across 107 games. He split the 2019 between Lynchburg and the Double–A Akron RubberDucks. In 114 games between the two affiliates, Brooks slashed .248/.321/.429 with 12 home runs and 54 RBI.

Brooks did not play in a game in 2020 due to the cancellation of the minor league season because of the COVID-19 pandemic. He returned to action in 2021 with Akron and the Triple–A Columbus Clippers. In 102 combined games, Brooks accumulated a .256/.351/.433 batting line with 12 home runs and 56 RBI.

Brooks spent the entirety of the 2022 season with Columbus, playing in 87 contests and hitting .273/.367/.464 with 11 home runs and 48 RBI. He elected free agency following the season on November 10, 2022.

=== Oakland Athletics ===
On November 14, 2022, Brooks signed a minor league contract with the Oakland Athletics organization. Brooks began the 2023 season with the Triple–A Las Vegas Aviators, hitting .299/.405/.529 with 16 home runs and 71 RBI across 94 games.

=== San Francisco Giants ===
On August 21, 2023, Brooks was traded to the San Francisco Giants in exchange for Sean Newcomb. He finished the year with the Triple–A Sacramento River Cats, for whom he hit .233/.282/.465 with six home runs and 19 RBI across 24 appearances.

Brooks began the 2024 campaign with Triple–A Sacramento, playing in 43 games and compiling a .308/.426/.462 batting line with four home runs, 18 RBI, and six stolen bases. On May 28, 2024, Brooks was selected to the 40-man roster and promoted to the major leagues for the first time. In 12 games for the Giants, he batted .120/.241/.120 with one RBI and one stolen base. On June 24, Brooks was designated for assignment following the promotion of Raymond Burgos. He cleared waivers and was sent outright to Sacramento on July 1. Brooks elected free agency following the season on November 4.

=== San Diego Padres ===
On November 13, 2024, Brooks signed a minor league contract with the San Diego Padres. In 60 appearances for the Triple-A El Paso Chihuahuas, he batted .311/.411/.590 with 14 home runs and 54 RBI. On June 15, 2025, the Padres selected Brooks' contract, adding him to their active roster where he hit a home run in his second game. On June 17, he hit his first career home run off of Matt Sauer of the Los Angeles Dodgers. Brooks made 25 appearances for San Diego, hitting .146/.186/.268 with one home run and two RBI. On July 31, he was designated for assignment along with Martín Maldonado. He cleared waivers and was sent outright to Triple-A El Paso on August 4. Brooks elected free agency on October 1.

=== Kiwoom Heroes ===
On December 16, 2025, Brooks signed a one-year, $850,000 contract with the Kiwoom Heroes of the KBO League. He made 41 appearances for the Heroes, batting .217/.286/.259 with 16 RBI and one stolen base. On May 18, 2026, Brooks was released by Kiwoom following the signing of Keston Hiura.

=== Houston Astros ===
On June 10, 2026, Brooks signed a minor league contract with the Houston Astros. In 59 games with Triple-A Sugar Land Space Cowboys he batted .253/.381/.374 with 4 home runs, 32 RBIs and 4 stolen bases. He elected free agency on November 2.
