= Dylan Cease =

American baseball player (born 1995)

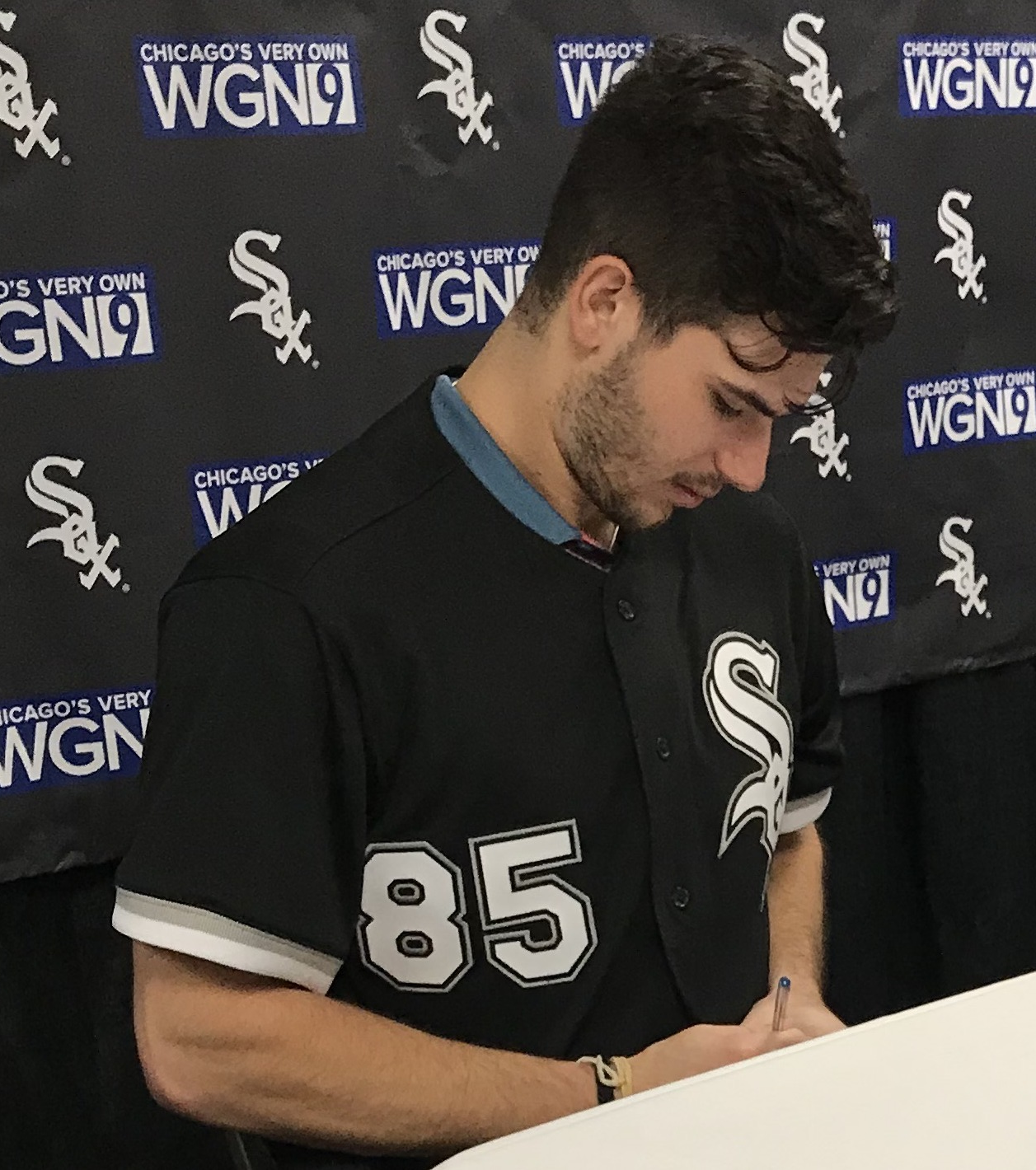
- Cease with the Chicago White Sox in 2019

Toronto Blue Jays – No. 84
- Pitcher
- Born: December 28, 1995 (age 30); Milton, Georgia, U.S.
- Bats: Right Throws: Right

MLB debut
- July 3, 2019, for the Chicago White Sox

MLB statistics (through 2026 season)
- Win–loss record: 76–64
- Earned run average: 3.67
- Strikeouts: 1,470
- Stats at Baseball Reference

Teams
- Chicago White Sox (2019–2023); San Diego Padres (2024–2025); Toronto Blue Jays (2026–present)

Career highlights and awards
- All-Star (2026); All-MLB First Team (2026); Pitched a no-hitter on July 25, 2024

Dylan Edward Cease (born December 28, 1995) is an American professional baseball pitcher for the Toronto Blue Jays of Major League Baseball (MLB). He has previously played in MLB for the Chicago White Sox and San Diego Padres.

Cease was selected by the Chicago Cubs in the sixth round of the 2014 MLB draft. He was later traded to the White Sox in 2017 and made his MLB debut with the team in 2019, playing through the 2023 season. Before the 2024 season, Cease was traded to the Padres, where he threw a no-hitter against the Washington Nationals on July 25. He remained with the Padres through the 2025 season, after which he became a free agent and signed with the Blue Jays for the largest free agent contract in Blue Jays history at the time. Cease was named to his first All-Star game in 2026.

== Early life ==
Cease was born on December 28, 1995, in Milton, Georgia, into a family with a strong baseball background. His father, Jeff Cease, played high school football, while his paternal grandmother, Betty Cease, was a professional baseball player in the late 1940s. His paternal uncle, Bruce Cease, was selected by the Washington Senators in the 1971 MLB draft and played as a first baseman for the Senators' and Houston Astros' minor league affiliates, the Geneva Senators and Cocoa Astros, during the 1971 and 1972 seasons.

Cease began playing baseball at the age of four alongside his fraternal twin brother Alec, who is one minute younger. Their father, Jeff, coached the teams they played on throughout their youth, and both brothers traveled extensively across the state of Georgia to participate in baseball competitions.

Having grown up in Milton, a suburb north of Atlanta within the Metro Atlanta area, Cease was an Atlanta Braves fan from a young age. His family held season tickets to Braves games at Turner Field, where he watched many contests live. During his childhood, Cease particularly admired Braves Hall of Famers Chipper Jones and John Smoltz, as well as Alex Rodriguez.

== High school career ==
Cease attended Milton High School in Milton, Georgia, graduating in 2014. He was a member of the school's baseball team, the Milton Eagles, and wore the No. 7 jersey as a tribute to Mickey Mantle. Serving as the team's ace pitcher, Cease was recognized for his ability to generate significant velocity while exerting minimal effort. His pitching arsenal consisted of a power fastball that averaged between 91 and 95 miles per hour (mph) with consistent command and a peak velocity of 97 mph; a curveball, considered his strongest secondary pitch, that averaged between 76 and 78 mph; and a changeup that averaged between 79 and 81 mph. In addition to pitching, he also played shortstop. Outside of school competitions, Cease competed with Team Elite, a nationally ranked travel baseball program based in Winder, Georgia, that focuses on developing youth players for high school, college, and professional baseball.

During his junior season, Cease led the Eagles to the 2013 GHSA Class 6A State Baseball Championship, the highest level of high school baseball competition in Georgia. He started Game 2 of the best-of-three series where he recorded 12 strikeouts in 6.0 innings pitched during a 5–3 win over the Roswell Hornets. The victory forced a decisive Game 3, which the Eagles won 2–1 to secure the state title. Cease finished his junior season with a 9–0 win–loss record, a 0.81 earned run average (ERA), and 100 strikeouts in 69 1/3 innings pitched.

After his junior season, Cease was invited to participate in the 2013 Perfect Game National Showcase, held at the Hubert H. Humphrey Metrodome in Minneapolis, Minnesota, from June 13 to 17. The event was designed to evaluate skills and offered top rising high school players from North America the opportunity to showcase their abilities to hundreds of college coaches and professional scouts. During the event, Cease threw a fastball recorded at 97 mph, a velocity significantly above the 80 mph average for the 2014 class. This effectively ranked him in the 99.96th percentile, or among the top 0.04 percent of prospects. Following this evaluation, he was selected to participate in the 2013 Perfect Game All-American Classic, a nationally televised all-star game held at Petco Park in San Diego, California, on August 11, featuring 50 of North America's top rising high school seniors. Cease was also invited to participate in the 2013 Under Armour All-America Baseball Game, a nationally televised all-star game held at Wrigley Field in Chicago, Illinois, on August 24, featuring 36 of North America's top high school baseball players.

Cease entered his senior season having committed to play college baseball for the Vanderbilt Commodores over offers from Auburn, Clemson, Georgia, Georgia Tech, Miami, and South Carolina. He was regarded as a potential first-round pick in the upcoming 2014 MLB draft, and was recognized as one of the hardest-throwing pitchers in his draft class. He received Perfect Game Preseason First Team All-American honors as one of North America's top 150 senior high school baseball players, and was ranked No. 12 nationally and No. 2 in Georgia by Perfect Game. On March 3, 2014, while pitching against the Johns Creek Gladiators, Cease exited the game in the fifth inning with soreness in his right elbow, his pitching arm; it was later diagnosed as a partial tear of the ulnar collateral ligament (UCL). He continued playing that season solely as a designated hitter. In May, he played in his second consecutive state championship as the Eagles entered the 2014 GHSA Class 6A State Baseball Championship as defending champions. Unable to pitch, the team lost to the Lambert Longhorns, who held the No. 1 national ranking from USA Today, and finished as state runners-up.

== Professional career ==
=== Draft and minor leagues ===
Cease was selected 169th overall by the Chicago Cubs in the sixth round of the 2014 MLB draft on June 6, 2014, directly out of high school. Although initially projected as a first-round pick, his draft position fell due to an elbow injury sustained months earlier during his senior season. He signed with the Cubs on July 4 for a $1.5 million signing bonus, which was the fourth-highest ever awarded to a sixth-round pick and significantly exceeded the recommended slot value of $269,500. Prior to signing, Cease had committed to attend Vanderbilt University in Nashville, Tennessee, to play college baseball for the Vanderbilt Commodores, but he forfeited his NCAA eligibility by signing a professional contract. The Cubs were able to offer this substantial bonus by signing their first-round pick, Kyle Schwarber, and their second-round pick, Jake Stinnett, for amounts significantly below their slot values, which allowed them flexibility within their total bonus pool to offer over-slot deals to later-round draftees like Cease to persuade him to forgo his college commitments. Later that month, on July 22, Cease underwent Tommy John surgery to repair a tear in the ulnar collateral ligament (UCL) of his right elbow, his pitching arm, with an expected recovery time of one year before returning to full-strength pitching.

Following a successful surgery and recovery, Cease resumed throwing in May 2015 and made his professional debut with the Rookie-level AZL Cubs. At the end of the 2015 season, Baseball America ranked Cease as the second-best prospect in the Arizona League, after he started eight games and appeared in a total of 11, with opposing batters hitting .145 against him.

In 2016, Cease played for the Short-Season A Eugene Emeralds. He posted a 2–0 win–loss record, a 2.22 earned run average (ERA), and 66 strikeouts in 44 2/3 innings pitched, averaging 13.3 strikeouts per nine innings (K/9), and held batters to a .175 average. Cease was named a 2016 Northwest League Post-Season All-Star and a Baseball America Short-Season All Star.

Cease began the 2017 season with the Class A South Bend Cubs, where he posted a 1–2 record with a 2.79 ERA in 13 starts and was named a Midwest League Mid-Season All-Star. Midway through the season, the Chicago Cubs traded Cease along with Eloy Jiménez, Matt Rose, and Bryant Flete to the Chicago White Sox in exchange for José Quintana on July 13, 2017. The White Sox subsequently assigned him to the Single-A Kannapolis Intimidators. Cease finished the 2017 season with a combined 1–10 record, a 3.28 ERA, and 126 strikeouts (12.2 K/9) in a career-high 93 1/3 innings pitched across 22 starts, and held batters to a .221 average.

Cease began the 2018 season with the High-A Winston-Salem Dash, posting a 9–2 record with a 2.89 ERA, before being promoted to the Double-A Birmingham Barons midway through the season. He finished the 2018 season with a combined 12–2 record, a 2.40 ERA, and 160 strikeouts (11.2 K/9) in 124.0 innings pitched across 23 starts, and held batters to a .189 average. Cease was selected to represent the White Sox at the 2018 All-Star Futures Game. He was named the MLB Pipeline Pitcher of the Year, and a Carolina League Mid-Season All-Star. After the 2018 season, the White Sox added Cease to their 40-man roster.

Cease began the 2019 season with the Triple-A Charlotte Knights before being called up to MLB by the White Sox midway through the season.

=== Chicago White Sox (2019–2023) ===
==== 2019 ====
Cease made his Major League Baseball (MLB) debut on July 3, 2019, playing for the Chicago White Sox in a game against the Detroit Tigers at Guaranteed Rate Field in Chicago, Illinois. He was the starting pitcher for the White Sox, allowing four hits, four walks, and three runs with six strikeouts in 5.0 innings pitched. Cease earned the win, the first of his career, in a 7–5 victory over the Tigers.

Cease finished the 2019 season with a 4–7 record, a 5.79 ERA, and 81 strikeouts in 73.0 innings pitched across 14 starts. His 9.99 K/9 set a White Sox franchise record for a rookie with a minimum of 10 starts, and his fastball velocity averaged 96.6 mph, which reached a peak of 100.1 mph.

==== 2020 ====
Cease finished the 2020 season with a 5–4 record, a 4.01 ERA, and 44 strikeouts in 58 1/3 innings pitched across 12 starts. Despite ranking notably in the top three percent in average fastball velocity in MLB, at 97.5 mph, he also led the American League (AL) with 34 walks allowed, 5.25 walks per nine innings (BB/9), and 1.85 home runs per nine innings (HR/9).

==== 2021 ====
Cease recorded his first career hit during a game against the Cincinnati Reds on May 4, 2021. He went 3-for-3 at the plate and pitched 6.0 scoreless innings, allowing one hit with 11 strikeouts, as the White Sox won 9–0.

Cease finished the 2021 season with a 13–7 record, a 3.91 ERA, and 226 strikeouts in 165 2/3 innings pitched across 32 starts. He led the AL with 12.3 K/9, 32 games started, and 13 wild pitches.

Cease made his first career postseason start on October 10, 2021, in Game 3 of the 2021 American League Division Series (ALDS) against the Houston Astros. He pitched only 1 2/3 innings in which he allowed two hits, three walks, and three runs, with two strikeouts in the White Sox' 12–6 win.

==== 2022 ====
Cease earned his first MLB award, the AL Pitcher of the Month Award, for the month of June 2022 after posting a 0.33 ERA, allowing one earned run in 27 1/3 innings pitched with 45 strikeouts across five starts. The following month, he earned his second consecutive AL Pitcher of the Month Award after posting a 5–1 record and a 0.76 ERA with 40 strikeouts in 35 2/3 innings pitched across six starts in July.

Cease's most notable pitching performance of the season occurred in a game against the Minnesota Twins on September 3, 2022. He carried a no-hitter through 8 2/3 innings before Luis Arráez hit a line drive single into right-center field, which ended the no-hitter with one out left in the game. Cease struck out Kyle Garlick in the next at-bat to end the game as a one-hit complete game shutout, marking the first complete game of his career. He allowed one hit and two walks with seven strikeouts in 9.0 innings pitched.

Cease finished the 2022 season with a 14–8 record, a 2.20 ERA, and 227 strikeouts in 184.0 innings pitched across 32 starts. He led MLB with 78 walks allowed. Cease threw the slider pitch 42.9 percent of the time, more than any other pitcher in MLB, and threw a 77.9 mph changeup, the slowest in MLB. His pitching arsenal primarily consisted of an 87 mph slider and a 97 mph four-seam fastball, in addition to an 81 mph curveball.

In recognition of his pitching performances and statistics, Cease was named to the All-MLB Second Team and finished second in the AL Cy Young Award voting behind Justin Verlander of the Houston Astros at the conclusion of the 2022 MLB season.

==== 2023 ====
Cease agreed to a one-year, $5.7 million contract with the White Sox on January 13, 2023, avoiding salary arbitration.

Cease finished the 2023 season with a 7–9 record, a 4.58 ERA, and 214 strikeouts in 177.0 innings pitched across 33 starts.

Cease agreed to an $8 million salary for the 2024 season with the White Sox on January 11, 2024, avoiding salary arbitration.

=== San Diego Padres (2024–2025) ===
==== 2024 ====
Prior to the start of the 2024 MLB season, the Chicago White Sox traded Cease to the San Diego Padres on March 13, 2024, in exchange for Drew Thorpe, Jairo Iriarte, Samuel Zavala and Steven Wilson.

Cease threw his first career no-hitter in a 3–0 win over the Washington Nationals on July 25, 2024. He allowed 3 walks with 9 strikeouts, and threw 71 of his 114 pitches for strikes. The no-hitter was the second in Padres franchise history, after teammate Joe Musgrove's on April 9, 2021.

Cease finished the 2024 season with a 14–11 record, a 3.47 ERA, and 224 strikeouts in 189 1/3 innings pitched across 33 starts, tied for the most in MLB.

==== 2025 ====
During a game against the Colorado Rockies on September 13, 2025, Cease struck out Ezequiel Tovar in the fourth inning to record his 200th strikeout of the season. This marked his fifth consecutive 200-strikeout season and made him only the fifth active pitcher with at least five consecutive 200-strikeout seasons (2021–2025); he joined Chris Sale (2013–2019), Clayton Kershaw (2010–2015), Justin Verlander (2009–2013), and Max Scherzer (2012–2019). Cease also joined Jake Peavy (2005–2007) as the only Padres pitchers with consecutive 200-strikeout seasons.

Cease finished the 2025 season with an 8–12 record, a 4.55 ERA, and 215 strikeouts in 168.0 innings pitched across 32 starts. He led MLB with 11.52 K/9.

After the 2025 season, Cease became a free agent.

=== Toronto Blue Jays (2026–present) ===
On December 2, 2025, Cease signed a seven-year, $210 million contract with the Toronto Blue Jays. At the time of signing, it was the largest free agent contract in Blue Jays history, surpassing the six-year, $150 million deal signed by George Springer on January 23, 2021.

==== 2026 ====
Cease's debut start resulted in a no decision; however, he set a Blue Jays franchise record with 12 strikeouts, the most by a pitcher in their team debut. The previous record of 11, established by David Price in 2015, had stood for 10 seasons. On July 8, Cease threw eight innings of no-hit baseball against the San Francisco Giants, but gave up a hit to the first batter in the ninth inning, and did not finish the game. On July 25, in a game against the Boston Red Sox, Cease pitched his second career complete game shutout, giving up one hit while striking out 12 batters.

Cease finished the 2026 season with an 11–6 record, a 2.40 ERA, and a career high 239 strikeouts in 169.0 innings pitched across 29 starts, tied for second in Ks in the AL and third overall with Cam Schlittler. Cease also led the AL in batting average against and strikeouts per 9 innings pitched with a .180 AVG and 12.73 K/9. On November 2, Cease was named a finalist for the American League Cy Young Award alongside Parker Messick and Cam Schlittler.

== International career ==
Cease appeared on the preliminary rosters for both Team Israel and Team USA ahead of the 2023 World Baseball Classic but ultimately opted not to participate.

== Personal life ==
Cease is of Jewish descent through his father.

Cease is an amateur disc golfer who partnered with six-time PDGA World Champion Paul McBeth to purchase two properties that will feature disc golf courses.

Cease practices mindfulness and wears the No. 84 jersey as a tribute to the 84 classic asanas in the yoga tradition and his favorite yogi, Sadhguru. He also practices art, with his work displayed at the Art Gallery of Ontario.

Awards and achievements
Preceded by Ronel Blanco	No-hitter pitcher July 25, 2024	Succeeded by Blake Snell
Preceded by Drew Rasmussen	American League Pitcher of the Month; July 2026	Succeeded by Noah Cameron
