= Chris Apecechea =

American baseball player and coach (born 1998)

San Diego Padres – No. 88
- Coach
- Born: January 8, 1998 (age 28); Palo Alto, California, U.S.
- Bats: Right Throws: Right

Teams
- San Diego Padres (2024–present)

Chris Apecechea (born January 8, 1998) is an American professional baseball coach who currently serves as the assistant pitching coach for the San Diego Padres of Major League Baseball (MLB).

== Early life ==
Apecechea grew up in San Mateo, California, and played high school baseball at Junípero Serra High School, the same high school that Tom Brady and Barry Bonds attended years earlier. He was recruited by the University of Hawai'i at Mānoa, but redshirted his freshman year in 2017 and did not play for the school. Apecechea spent the 2018 season at the College of San Mateo, compiling a 3–1 record and 3.41 ERA with 14 strikeouts across 29 innings pitched.

Apecechea transferred to High Point University in 2019. In three seasons for the school, he accumulated a 2–2 record and 4.93 ERA with 20 strikeouts across 38 1/3 innings pitched.

== Career ==
Following the conclusion of his collegiate career in 2021, Apecechea worked as a solutions contributor at Tread Athletics, a Charlotte, North Carolina–based baseball training facility whose clientele includes major league players and prospects.

On June 30, 2022, Apecechea was hired by the San Diego Padres organization to serve as a pitching performance analyst.

Prior to the 2025 season, the Padres announced that Apecechea had been added to the major league coaching staff under the role of "coaching assistant, pitching."

== Personal life ==
Apecechea's uncle, Zach Elliott, played professionally in the Philadelphia Phillies organization from 1995 to 1997.
