= Stephen Kolek =

American baseball player (born 1997)

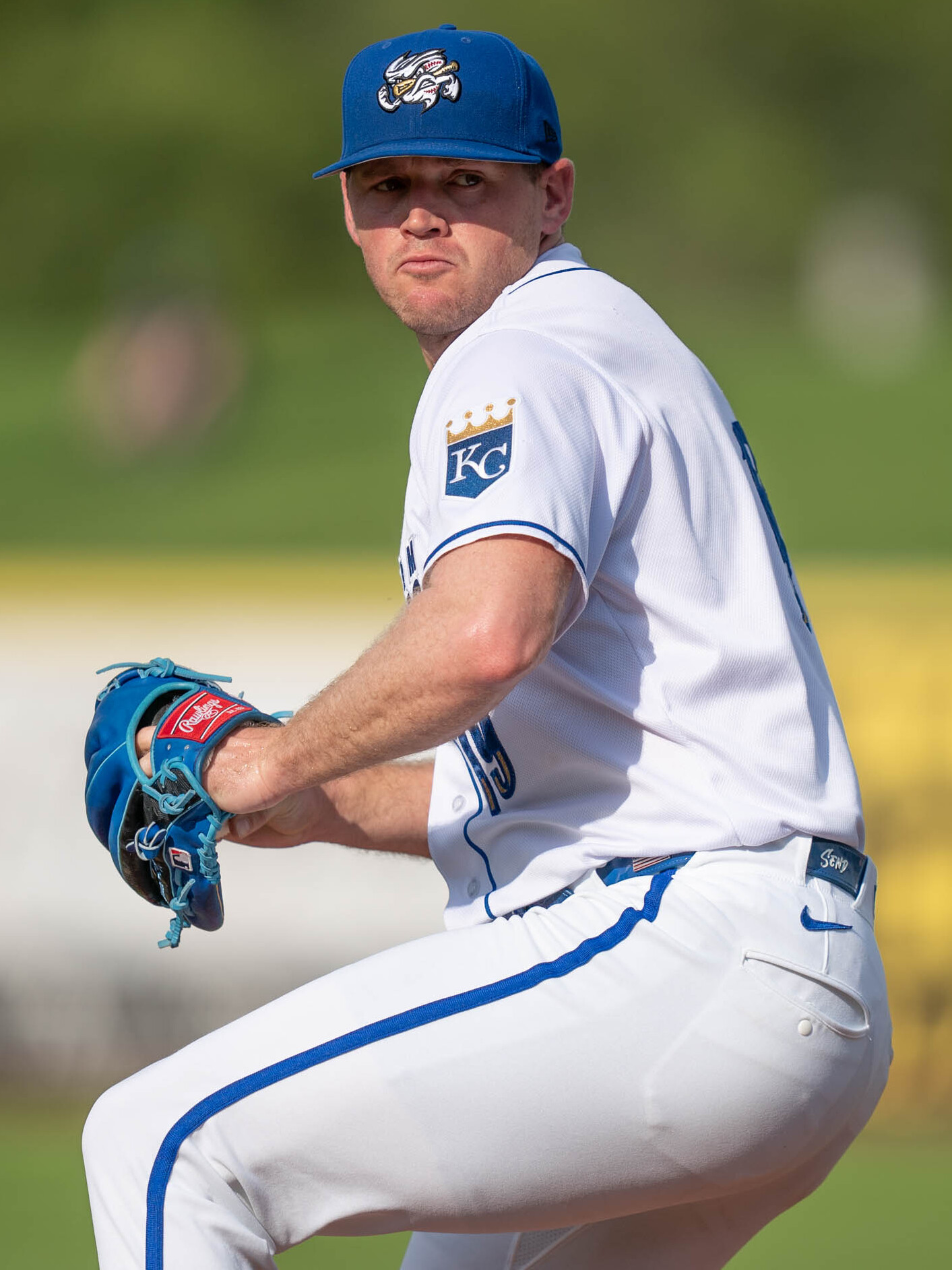
- Kolek with the Omaha Storm Chasers in 2026

Kansas City Royals – No. 32
- Pitcher
- Born: April 18, 1997 (age 29); Houston, Texas, U.S.
- Bats: Right Throws: Right

MLB debut
- March 21, 2024, for the San Diego Padres

MLB statistics (through 2026 season)
- Win–loss record: 12–10
- Earned run average: 4.13
- Strikeouts: 150
- Stats at Baseball Reference

Teams
- San Diego Padres (2024–2025); Kansas City Royals (2025–present)

Stephen James Kolek (born April 18, 1997) is an American professional baseball pitcher for the Kansas City Royals of Major League Baseball (MLB). He has previously played in MLB for the San Diego Padres.

== Career ==
=== Amateur career ===
Kolek attended Shepherd High School in Shepherd, Texas. He enrolled at Texas A&M University, where he played college baseball for the Texas A&M Aggies from 2016 to 2018.

=== Los Angeles Dodgers ===
The Los Angeles Dodgers selected Kolek in the 11th round, with the 344th overall selection, of the 2018 Major League Baseball draft. He spent his first professional season with the rookie–level Ogden Raptors and Single–A Great Lakes Loons, accumulating a 1.42 ERA with 30 strikeouts across 17 contests. Kolek returned to Great Lakes in 2019, going 7–8 with a 5.00 ERA and 109 strikeouts in 27 games (25 starts). He did not play in a game in 2020 due to the cancellation of the minor league season because of the COVID-19 pandemic.

=== Seattle Mariners ===
On April 28, 2021, the Dodgers traded Kolek to the Seattle Mariners in exchange for cash considerations. He split the year between the Single–A Modesto Nuts, High–A Everett AquaSox, and Double–A Arkansas Travelers. In 24 combined appearances, Kolek struggled to a 6.03 ERA with 67 strikeouts across 59 2/3 innings pitched. In 2022, he made 27 starts for Arkansas, registering a 6–13 record and 4.51 ERA with 138 strikeouts across 143 2/3 innings of work. In 2023, Kolek made five scoreless appearances for Arkansas before being promoted to the Triple–A Tacoma Rainiers, where he spent the remainder of the year. In 44 appearances for Tacoma, he recorded a 4.23 ERA with 65 strikeouts and 4 saves across 61 2/3 innings pitched.

=== San Diego Padres ===
On December 6, 2023, the San Diego Padres selected Kolek from the Mariners in the Rule 5 draft. On March 19, 2024, the Padres announced that Kolek made their Opening Day roster. In 42 appearances out of the bullpen, he compiled a 5.21 ERA with 39 strikeouts over 46 2/3 innings pitched. Kolek was placed on the injured list with right forearm tendinitis on July 31. He was transferred to the 60–day injured list on September 1, officially ending his season. Kolek was optioned to the Triple-A El Paso Chihuahuas to begin the 2025 season.

In early May, Kolek was recalled to the major league team, this time to serve as a starter. He tossed 5 1/3 scoreless innings in his May 4 season debut, allowing four hits and striking out four as he earned the win. His second career start, on May 10, was a complete-game shutout. Kolek tied a Modern Era-record for the largest margin in an individual shutout, as San Diego scored 21 against the Rockies. In 14 starts for San Diego, he compiled a 4-5 record and 4.18 ERA with 56 strikeouts across 79 2/3 innings pitched.

=== Kansas City Royals ===
On July 31, 2025, Kolek and Ryan Bergert were traded to the Kansas City Royals in exchange for catcher Freddy Fermín. He made five starts down the stretch for Kansas City, recording a 1.91 ERA with 21 strikeouts over 33 innings of work.

On May 23, 2026, Kolek pitched a complete–game shutout against the Seattle Mariners in a 5–0 victory. He made 10 starts for Kansas City, compiling a 4–3 record and 4.50 ERA with 34 strikeouts over 54 innings of work. On July 19, Kolek was placed on the injured list due to a right flexor strain. He was transferred to the 60-day injured list three days later. On August 5, Kolek underwent Tommy John surgery, ruling him out for the remainder of the season.

== Personal life ==
His brother is Tyler Kolek, a former professional baseball player and 2nd overall pick by the Miami Marlins in 2014.

== See also ==
- Rule 5 draft results
