= Freddy Fermin =

Venezuelan baseball player (born 1995)

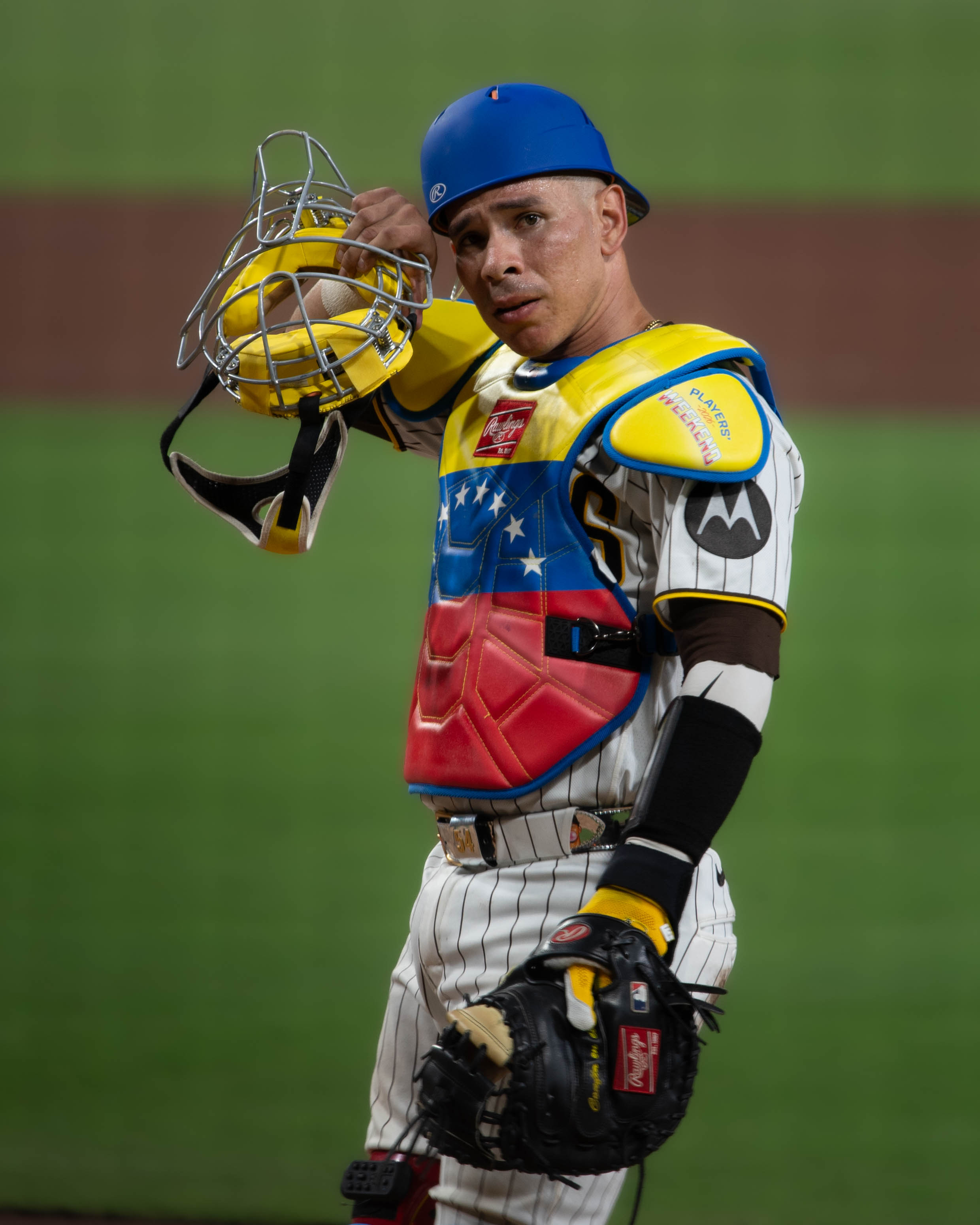
- Fermín with the San Diego Padres in 2026

San Diego Padres – No. 54
- Catcher
- Born: May 16, 1995 (age 31); Puerto Ordaz, Venezuela
- Bats: Right Throws: Right

MLB debut
- July 15, 2022, for the Kansas City Royals

MLB statistics (through 2026 season)
- Batting average: .251
- Home runs: 24
- Runs batted in: 118
- Stats at Baseball Reference

Teams
- Kansas City Royals (2022–2025); San Diego Padres (2025–present)

Freddy Antonio Fermin (born May 16, 1995) is a Venezuelan professional baseball catcher for the San Diego Padres of Major League Baseball (MLB). He has previously played in MLB for the Kansas City Royals.

== Career ==
=== Kansas City Royals ===
Fermin signed with the Kansas City Royals organization as an international free agent on July 25, 2015. He made his professional debut with the Dominican Summer League Royals the following year, hitting .273 across 52 contests. In 2017, Fermín played in 47 games for the rookie-level Idaho Falls Chukars, slashing .282/.403/.356 with one home run and 39 RBI. He split the 2018 season between Idaho Falls and the rookie-level Burlington Royals, posting a cumulative .249/.346/.350 slash line with two home runs and 19 RBI.

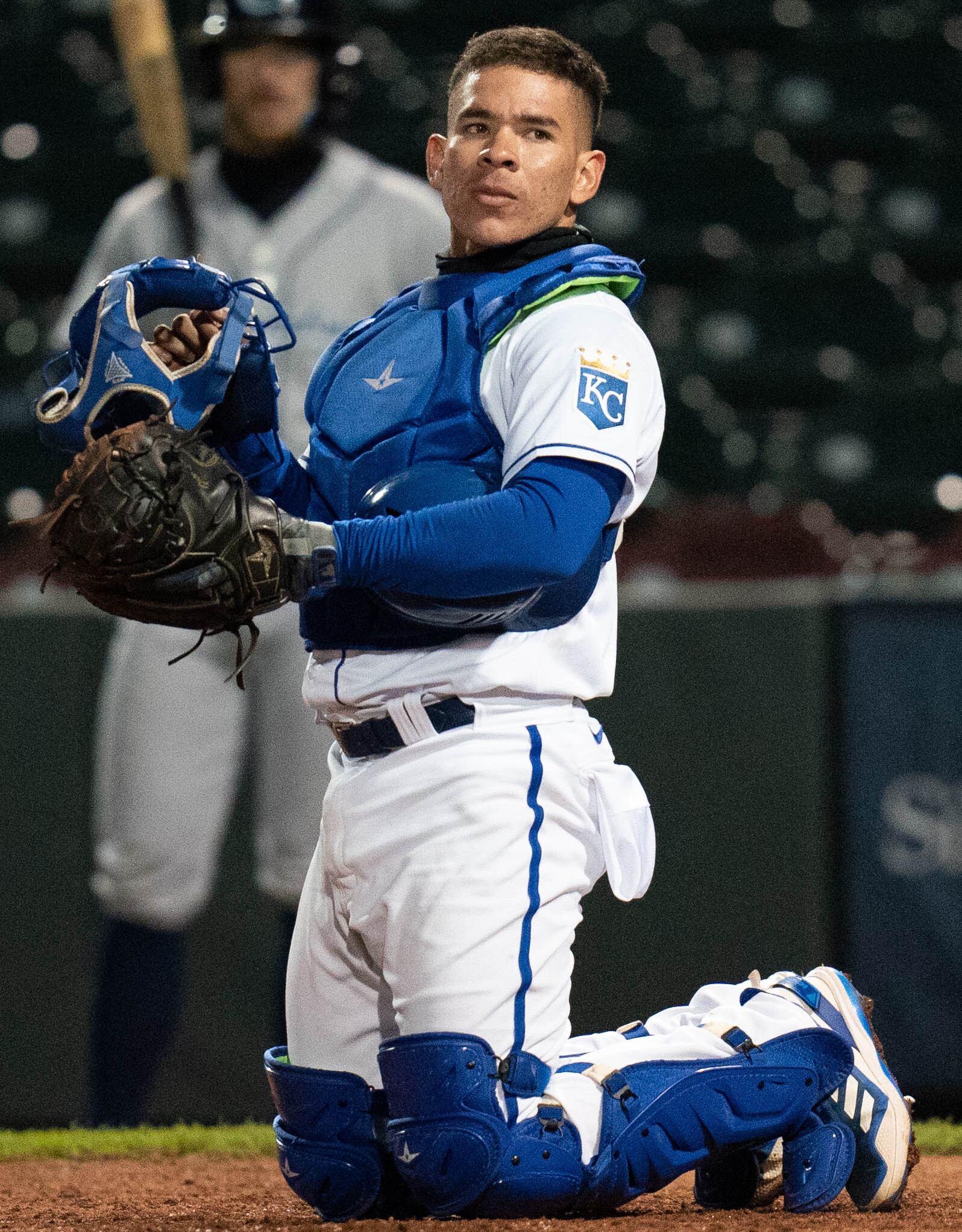
Fermín with the Omaha Storm Chasers in 2022

In 2019, Fermin split the season between the Single-A Lexington Legends and the Double-A Northwest Arkansas Naturals, hitting .260/.298/.418 with career-highs in home runs (12) and RBI (41) in 86 games between the two affiliates. Fermín did not play in a game in 2020 due to the cancellation of the minor league season because of the COVID-19 pandemic. In 2021 he spent time with Northwest Arkansas and the Triple-A Omaha Storm Chasers, batting .277/.355/.440 with 10 home runs and 47 RBI in 77 contests. He was assigned to Triple-A Omaha to begin the 2022 season.

On July 14, 2022, Fermin was selected to the 40-man roster and called up to the majors for the first time after multiple players were placed on the restricted list prior to a series in Canada against the Toronto Blue Jays. He made his MLB debut on July 15, ultimately appearing in 3 games but going hitless in 7 at-bats. He was removed from the 40-man roster and returned to Omaha on July 17.

On November 15, 2022, the Royals selected Fermin's contract back to the 40-man roster to protect him from the Rule 5 draft. Fermín was optioned to Triple-A Omaha to begin the 2023 season. He played in 70 games for the team, hitting .281/.321/.461 with nine home runs and 32 RBI.

Fermin began the 2024 season as the Royals' regular backup catcher. He made 111 appearances for Kansas City during the regular season, slashing .271/.319/.366 with six home runs and 36 RBI.

Fermin played in 67 games for the Royals in 2025, batting .255/.309/.339 with three home runs, 12 RBI, and one stolen base.

=== San Diego Padres ===
On July 31, 2025, the Royals traded Fermin to the San Diego Padres in exchange for Ryan Bergert and Stephen Kolek.
