= Noah Cameron =

American baseball player (born 1999)

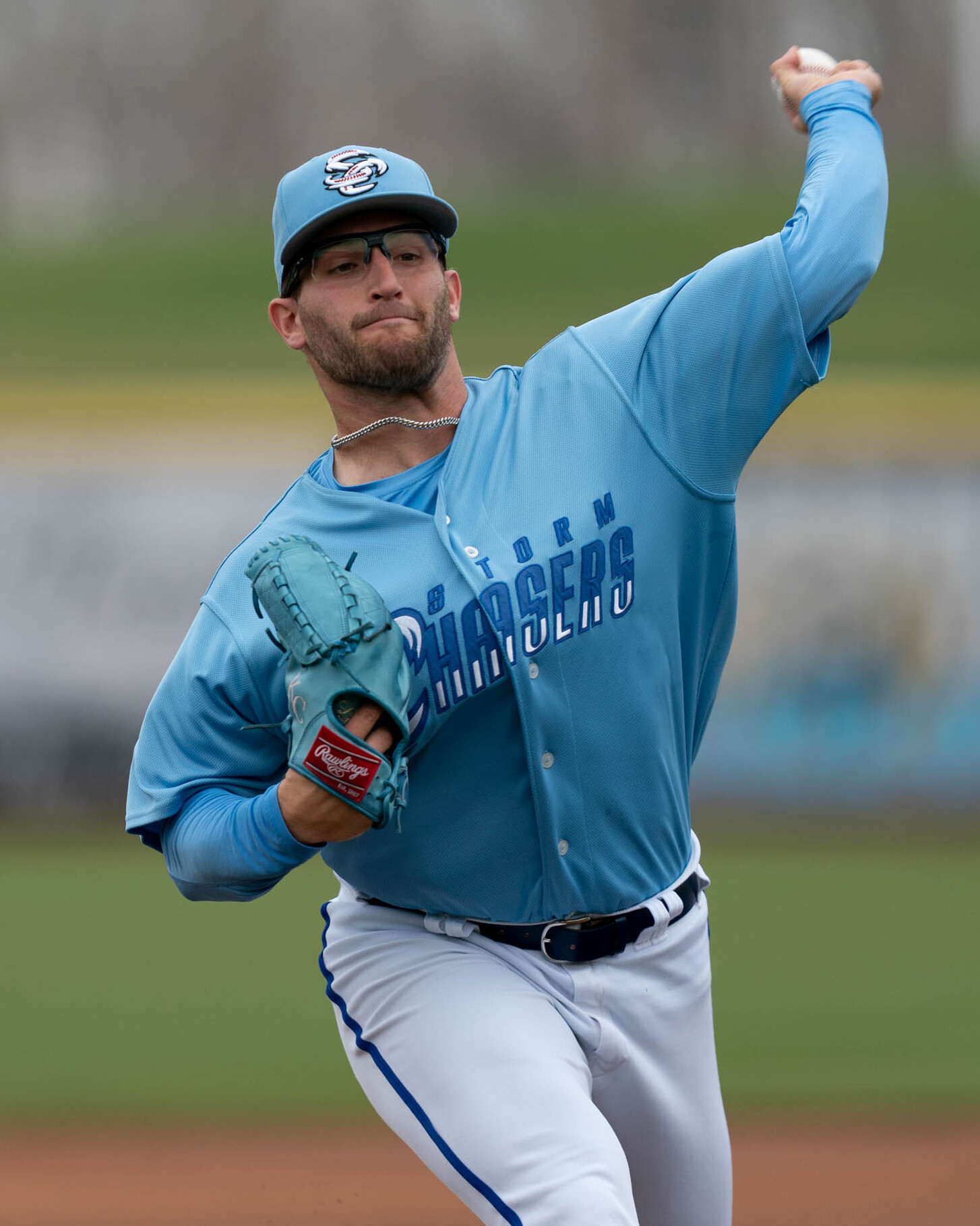
- Cameron with the Omaha Storm Chasers in 2025

Kansas City Royals – No. 65
- Pitcher
- Born: July 17, 1999 (age 27); St. Joseph, Missouri, U.S.
- Bats: Left Throws: Left

MLB debut
- April 30, 2025, for the Kansas City Royals

MLB statistics (through 2026 season)
- Win–loss record: 18–15
- Earned run average: 3.62
- Strikeouts: 272
- Stats at Baseball Reference

Teams
- Kansas City Royals (2025–present)

Noah Cameron (born July 17, 1999) is an American professional baseball pitcher for the Kansas City Royals of Major League Baseball (MLB). He made his MLB debut in 2025.

== Amateur career ==
Cameron attended Central High School in St. Joseph, Missouri, and played college baseball at the University of Central Arkansas. In summer 2020, he played collegiate summer baseball for the Willmar Stingers of the Northwoods League.

== Professional career ==
Cameron was selected by the Kansas City Royals in the seventh round of the 2021 Major League Baseball draft, however, he did not pitch in 2021 after undergoing Tommy John surgery in August 2020.

Cameron returned from the injury for his first professional season in 2022, advancing from the rookie–level Arizona Complex League Royals to the Single–A Columbia Fireflies, and then the High–A Quad Cities River Bandits. He split the 2023 season between Quad Cities and the Double–A Northwest Arkansas Naturals, accumulating a 5-12 record and 5.28 ERA with 132 strikeouts across 107 1/3 innings pitched.

Cameron split the 2024 campaign between Northwest Arkansas and the Triple–A Omaha Storm Chasers, compiling a 7–6 record and 3.08 ERA with 149 strikeouts across 128 2/3 innings pitched over 25 starts. Following the season, the Royals added Cameron to their 40-man roster to protect him from the Rule 5 draft.

Cameron was optioned to Triple-A Omaha to begin the 2025 season. On April 30, 2025, Cameron was promoted to the major leagues for the first time. In his debut against the Tampa Bay Rays, he went 6 1/3 innings before allowing a hit, striking out three and earning his first career win. In his first Major League season, Cameron had a win–loss record of 9–7 and posted a 2.99 ERA with 114 strikeouts over 138 1/3 and 24 games, all starts. He placed fourth in AL Rookie of the Year voting, behind unanimous winner Nick Kurtz of the Athletics, his teammate Jacob Wilson, and Roman Anthony of the Boston Red Sox.

On August 16, 2026, pitched a complete game shutout against the Los Angeles Angels, allowing only one hit in the 3–0 victory.

Awards and achievements
Preceded by Dylan Cease	American League Pitcher of the Month; August 2026	Succeeded by Freddy Peralta
