= Ryan Bergert =

American baseball player (born 2000)

Kansas City Royals – No. 38
- Pitcher
- Born: March 8, 2000 (age 26); Canton, Ohio, U.S.
- Bats: Right Throws: Right

MLB debut
- April 26, 2025, for the San Diego Padres

MLB statistics (through 2025 season)
- Win–loss record: 2–2
- Earned run average: 3.66
- Strikeouts: 73
- Stats at Baseball Reference

Teams
- San Diego Padres (2025); Kansas City Royals (2025)

Ryan Michael Bergert (born March 8, 2000) is an American professional baseball pitcher for the Kansas City Royals of Major League Baseball (MLB). He has previously played in MLB for the San Diego Padres.

== Amateur career ==
Bergert attended GlenOak High School in Canton, Ohio, where he played baseball. As a senior in 2019, he went 4–2 with a 3.19 ERA and 66 strikeouts over 37 innings. After graduating, he enrolled at West Virginia University where he played college baseball for the Mountaineers.

As a freshman at West Virginia in 2019, Bergert pitched to a 2–0 record and a 1.85 ERA over 34 innings. As a sophomore in 2020, he posted a 2.92 ERA over 24 2/3 innings. That summer, he played in the Northwoods League for the Fond du Lac Dock Spiders. He did not play a game with West Virginia in 2021 after undergoing Tommy John surgery.

== Professional career ==
=== San Diego Padres ===
Bergert was selected by the San Diego Padres in the sixth round (190th overall) of the 2021 Major League Baseball draft.

Bergert signed with the Padres and made his professional debut near the end of the 2021 season with the rookie-level Arizona Complex League Padres, giving up no earned runs over 11 innings. He played the 2022 season with the High-A Fort Wayne TinCaps, starting 24 games and going 4–10 with a 5.84 ERA and 129 strikeouts over 103 1/3 innings. He returned to Fort Wayne to open the 2023 season. He was promoted to the Double-A San Antonio Missions in mid-July. Over 23 games (twenty starts), Bergert went 6–4 with a 2.73 ERA and 126 strikeouts over 105 2/3 innings.

Bergert was assigned back to San Antonio to open the 2024 season. In 23 starts for the Missions, he logged a 2–10 record and 4.78 ERA with 87 strikeouts across 98 innings of work. Following the season, the Padres added Bergert to their 40-man roster to protect him from the Rule 5 draft.

Bergert was optioned to the Triple-A El Paso Chihuahuas to begin the 2025 season. On April 25, 2025, the Padres selected Bergert's contract and promoted him to the major leagues for the first time. He made his MLB debut on April 26, pitching one scoreless inning in relief versus the Tampa Bay Rays. Bergert recorded his first career win on May 5, in the Padres' win over the New York Yankees. In 11 appearances (seven starts) for San Diego, he compiled a 1–0 record and 2.78 ERA with 34 strikeouts across 35 2/3 innings pitched.

=== Kansas City Royals ===
On July 31, 2025, the Padres traded Bergert and Stephen Kolek to the Kansas City Royals in exchange for catcher Freddy Fermín. Bergert made his Royals debut on August 5 against the Boston Red Sox and gave up two runs over 5 2/3 innings. He was placed on the injured list on September 18 with forearm tightness, ending his season. Bergert made eight starts for the Royals and went 1–2 with a 4.43 ERA and 39 strikeouts across 40 2/3 innings.

Bergert was optioned to the Triple-A Omaha Storm Chasers to open the 2026 season. He made three starts for Omaha, logging an 0–1 record and 2.79 ERA with 10 strikeouts across 9 2/3 innings pitched. On April 29, 2026, it was announced that Bergert had undergone Tommy John surgery, ending his season.
