= Matt Sauer =

American baseball player (born 1999)

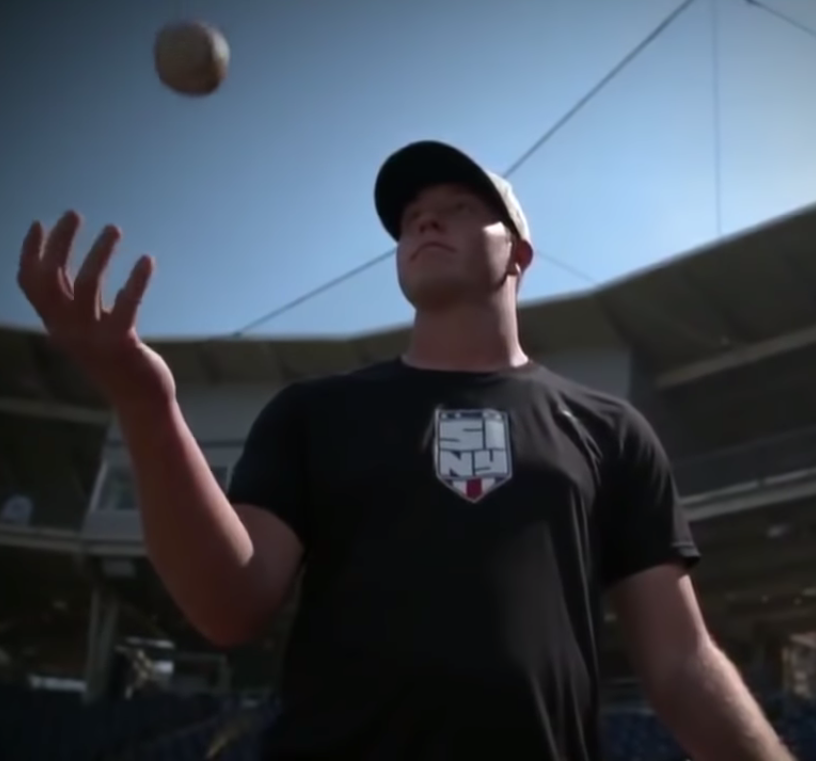
- Sauer in 2018

Free agent
- Pitcher
- Born: January 21, 1999 (age 27); Santa Maria, California, U.S.
- Bats: Right Throws: Right

Professional debut
- MLB: March 31, 2024, for the Kansas City Royals
- KBO: March 28, 2026, for the KT Wiz

MLB statistics (through 2025 season)
- Win–loss record: 2–1
- Earned run average: 6.85
- Strikeouts: 33

KBO statistics (through 2026 season)
- Win–loss record: 7–5
- Earned run average: 4.88
- Strikeouts: 71
- Stats at Baseball Reference

Teams
- Kansas City Royals (2024); Los Angeles Dodgers (2025); KT Wiz (2026)

Matthew David Sauer (born January 21, 1999) is an American professional baseball pitcher who is a free agent. He has previously played in Major League Baseball (MLB) for the Kansas City Royals and Los Angeles Dodgers, and in the KBO League for the KT Wiz.

== Career ==
=== Amateur career ===
Sauer attended Righetti High School in Santa Maria, California. As a senior, he went 9–1 with a 0.98 earned run average (ERA) and 142 strikeouts. He committed to the University of Arizona to play college baseball.

=== New York Yankees ===
The New York Yankees selected Sauer in the second round, with the 54th overall selection, of the 2017 Major League Baseball draft. Sauer officially signed with the Yankees on June 24. and was assigned to the rookie–level Gulf Coast League Yankees, where he spent the whole 2017 season, posting an 0–2 record with a 5.40 ERA in 11 2/3 innings pitched. In 2018, he pitched with the Low–A Staten Island Yankees where he went 3–6 with a 3.90 ERA in 13 starts and 67 innings.

Sauer spent 2019 with the Single–A Charleston RiverDogs, but pitched only 8 2/3 innings due to injury. He did not play a minor league game in 2020 due to the cancellation of the minor league season because of the COVID-19 pandemic. Sauer split the 2021 season between the Single–A Tampa Tarpons and the High–A Hudson Valley Renegades, appearing in 23 games (21 starts) and going 5–6 with a 4.69 ERA and 127 strikeouts over 111 1/3 innings.

Sauer began the 2022 season with Hudson Valley and was promoted to the Double–A Somerset Patriots in August. He struck out 17 batters in a game on August 25. Sauer finished the year making 22 starts and logging a 4.54 ERA with 134 strikeouts across 109 innings pitched. He spent the 2023 season with Somerset also briefly appearing for Hudson Valley, and the rookie–level Florida Complex League Yankees. In 14 games (13 starts) for Somerset, Sauer registered a 6–5 record and 3.41 ERA with 93 strikeouts across 74 innings pitched. After the 2023 season, Sauer pitched for the Mesa Solar Sox of the Arizona Fall League.

=== Kansas City Royals ===
On December 6, 2023, the Kansas City Royals selected Sauer from the Yankees in the Rule 5 draft. On March 23, 2024, manager Matt Quatraro announced that Sauer had made Kansas City's Opening Day roster as a relief pitcher who can pitch multiple innings. He made his MLB debut on March 31, 2024, against the Minnesota Twins, pitching a scoreless inning of relief. He recorded his first strikeout three games later, on April 11, against Jon Singleton of the Houston Astros. In 14 appearances for the Royals, he struggled to a 7.71 ERA with nine strikeouts across 16 1/3 innings pitched. On May 20, Sauer was designated for assignment following the promotion of Sam Long.

=== New York Yankees (second stint) ===
On May 26, 2024, the Royals returned Sauer to the New York Yankees organization. He was subsequently assigned to the Triple–A Scranton/Wilkes-Barre RailRiders. In 27 appearances split between Scranton and the Double–A Somerset Patriots, he accumulated a 3–2 record and 6.12 ERA with 30 strikeouts across 32 1/3 innings pitched. Sauer elected free agency following the season on November 4.

=== Los Angeles Dodgers ===
On December 16, 2024, Sauer signed a minor league contract with the Los Angeles Dodgers. He was added to the 40-man roster and called up to the major leagues on March 18, 2025. However, Sauer did not appear in the one game he was active for in the Tokyo Series and was optioned to the Triple-A Oklahoma City Comets to begin the minor league season. After one game for the Comets, Sauer made his Dodgers debut on April 7, against the Washington Nationals before returning to the minors the following day. On April 29, Sauer recorded his first career win against the Miami Marlins. The following week, on May 7, he recorded his first career save against the same team. Sauer played in 10 games for the Dodgers, allowing 23 runs in 29 2/3 innings with 24 strikeouts for a 6.37 ERA. He also made 17 starts in Oklahoma City with a 5–5 record and 5.86 ERA. He was designated for assignment by Los Angeles on September 6. Sauer was released by the Dodgers on September 10. He re-signed with the organization on a minor league contract on September 18. Sauer was released again on November 4.

=== KT Wiz ===
On November 7, 2025, Sauer signed a one-year, $950,000 contract with the KT Wiz of the KBO League. He made 18 starts for the team, compiling a 7–5 record and 4.88 ERA with 71 strikeouts across 101 1/3 innings pitched. On July 30, 2026, Sauer was released by the Wiz.

=== Athletics ===
On August 7, 2026, Sauer signed a minor league contract with the Athletics. In 8 games (7 starts) with Triple-A Las Vegas Aviators he threw 24.2 innings going 1-3 with an 11.68 ERA with more walks (22) than strikeouts (14). He elected free agency on November 2.

== Personal life ==
Sauer's parents are David and Tami. His mother was born on Kadena Air Base in Okinawa. Sauer met his future wife Reagan in middle school, and they also attended the same high school. Sauer is a Christian, and has attributed the strength of his faith to former minor league roommates Gary Whitlock and Glenn Otto.

== See also ==
- Rule 5 draft results
