= 2023 San Francisco Giants season =

2023 San Francisco Giants
- League: National League
- Division: West
- Ballpark: Oracle Park
- City: San Francisco, California
- Record: 79–83 (.488)
- Divisional place: 4th
- Owners: Charles B. Johnson (Majority shareholder); Greg E. Johnson (Chairman)
- President: Larry Baer
- President of baseball operations: Farhan Zaidi
- Managers: Gabe Kapler (until September 29); Kai Correa (interim, September 29-October 1)
- Television: NBC Sports Bay Area/KNTV (Duane Kuiper, Jon Miller, Dave Flemming, Mike Krukow, Javier Lopez, Shawn Estes, Hunter Pence)
- Radio: KNBR (104.5 FM and 680 AM) (Jon Miller, Dave Flemming, Duane Kuiper, Mike Krukow, Joe Ritzo, F. P. Santangelo)
- Stats: ESPN.com; Baseball Reference

The 2023 San Francisco Giants season was the 141st season for the franchise in Major League Baseball, their 66th year in San Francisco, and their 24th at Oracle Park. The team was managed by Gabe Kapler until September where with three games remaining, the Giants relieved Kapler of his duties. The San Francisco Giants drew an average home attendance of 30,866 in 81 home games in the 2023 MLB season, the 17th highest in the league. The total attendance was 2,500,153.

The Giants faced challenges at the beginning of the season, posting an 11–17 record in their initial 28 games. Nevertheless, they managed to rebound, achieving a 54–41 record and securing a winning record of 61–49. Despite their initial resurgence, they could not avoid a late-season collapse, finishing the remaining games at 18–34. Consequently, they were unable to surpass their 81–81 record from the previous season, ending with a losing record of 79–83. This outcome eliminated them from playoff contention for the second consecutive season.

== Offseason ==
=== Rule changes ===
Pursuant to the CBA, new rule changes will be in place for the 2023 season:

- institution of a pitch clock between pitches;
- limits on pickoff attempts per plate appearance;
- limits on defensive shifts requiring two infielders to be on either side of second and be within the boundary of the infield; and
- larger bases (increased to 18-inch squares).

=== Transactions ===
- November 6, 2022 − LHP Carlos Rodón exercised his 2023 opt-out clause, allowing him to become a free agent.
- November 16, 2022 − The Giants declined to exercise their option on 3B Evan Longoria, allowing him to become a free agent.
- December 7, 2022 − The Giants signed OF Mitch Haniger to a three-year contract. Haniger can opt out of the contract after the 2024 season.
- December 13, 2022 − The Giants signed RHP Ross Stripling to a two-year contract. Stripling can opt out of the contract after one year.
- December 16, 2022 − The Giants signed LHP Sean Manaea to a two-year contract. Manaea can opt out of the contract after one year.
- December 28, 2022 − The Giants signed LHP Taylor Rogers to a three-year contract.
- January 6, 2023 − The Giants signed OF Michael Conforto to a two-year contract. Conforto can opt out of the contract after one year.
- January 9, 2023 − The Giants signed RHP Luke Jackson to a two-year contract with a club option for the 2025 season.
- January 9, 2023 − The Giants traded RHP Yunior Marte to Philadelphia Phillies for LHP Erik Miller.
- January 13, 2023 − The Giants avoided arbitration with RHP Logan Webb, RHP John Brebbia, RHP Jakob Junis, OF Austin Slater, INF J. D. Davis, OF LaMonte Wade Jr., RHP Tyler Rogers, and INF Thairo Estrada agreeing to one-year deals.
- July 31, 2023 – The Giants acquired OF A. J. Pollock and 2B/OF Mark Mathias in a trade with the Seattle Mariners in exchange for cash considerations or a player to be named later.

== Spring training ==
=== World Baseball Classic ===
The 2023 World Baseball Classic (WBC) is took place from March 8 to March 21, 2023. The following Giants players participated in the tournament:

Player	Position	National team
Jonathan Bermúdez (minors)	Left-handed Pitcher	Puerto Rico
Camilo Doval	Right-handed Pitcher	Dominican Republic
Joey Marciano (minors)	Left-handed Pitcher	Italy
Joc Pederson	Outfielder	Israel
Kai-Wei Teng (minors)	Right-handed Pitcher	Taiwan

In addition, the Giants hosted the United States in a pre-tournament warm-up game on March 8th, winning 5–1.

Friendly	March 8	United States	1–5	San Francisco Giants	Scottsdale Stadium, United States
Friendly	19:07 MT	LP: Miles Mikolas (0–1); HR: Paul Goldschmidt (1)	Boxscore	WP: Anthony DeSclafani (1–0); HR: David Villar (1)	Attendance: 6,690; Umpires: HP – Nate Tomlinson, 1B – Dan Bellino, 2B – Omar Peralta, 3B – Charlie Ramos

== Regular season ==
=== Game log ===
Legend
	Giants win
	Giants loss
	Postponement
	Eliminated from playoff race
**Bold**	Giants team member

2023 Game Log: 79–83 (Home: 45–36; Away: 34–47)
March/April: 11–16 (Home: 7–7; Away: 4–9)

#	Date	Opponent	Score	Win	Loss	Save	Stadium	Attendance	Record
1	March 30	@ Yankees	0–5	Cole (1–0)	**Webb** (0–1)	—	Yankee Stadium	46,172	0–1
2	April 1	@ Yankees	7–5	**Junis** (1–0)	King (0–1)	**Doval** (1)	Yankee Stadium	41,642	1–1
3	April 2	@ Yankees	0–6	Brito (1–0)	**Stripling** (0–1)	—	Yankee Stadium	42,053	1–2
4	April 3	@ White Sox	12–3	**DeSclafani** (1–0)	Kopech (0–1)	—	Guaranteed Rate Field	34,784	2–2
5	April 5	@ White Sox	3–7	Cease (1–0)	**Webb** (0–2)	—	Guaranteed Rate Field	15,980	2–3
6	April 6	@ White Sox	16–6	**Junis** (2–0)	Lynn (0–1)	—	Guaranteed Rate Field	18,261	3–3
7	April 7	Royals	1–3	Keller (1–1)	**Cobb** (0–1)	Barlow (1)	**Oracle Park**	40,711	3–4
8	April 8	Royals	5–6	Clarke (1–0)	**Doval** (0–1)	Chapman (1)	**Oracle Park**	35,126	3–5
9	April 9	Royals	3–1	**Brebbia** (1–0)	Yarbrough (0–1)	**Ty. Rogers** (1)	**Oracle Park**	30,207	4–5
10	April 10	Dodgers	1–9	Urías (3–0)	**Webb** (0–3)	—	**Oracle Park**	35,232	4–6
11	April 11	Dodgers	5–0	**Alexander** (1–0)	May (1–1)	—	**Oracle Park**	30,768	5–6
12	April 12	Dodgers	5–10	Kershaw (2–1)	**Ta. Rogers** (0–1)	—	**Oracle Park**	34,903	5–7
13	April 14	@ Tigers	5–7 (11)	Cisnero (1–0)	**Doval** (0–2)	—	Comerica Park	15,289	5–8
14	April 15	@ Tigers	6–7 (11)	Shreve (1–1)	**Ta. Rogers** (0–2)	—	Comerica Park	18,344	5–9
—	April 16	@ Tigers	Postponed (inclement weather); Makeup: July 24						
15	April 17	@ Marlins	3–4	Barnes (1–0)	**Webb** (0–4)	Puk (2)	LoanDepot Park	8,744	5–10
16	April 18	@ Marlins	2–4	Cabrera (1–1)	**Junis** (2–1)	Puk (3)	LoanDepot Park	8,783	5–11
17	April 19	@ Marlins	5–2 (11)	**Doval** (1–2)	Smeltzer (0–1)	**Ta. Rogers** (1)	LoanDepot Park	8,272	6–11
18	April 20	Mets	4–9	Senga (3–0)	**Manaea** (0–1)	—	**Oracle Park**	24,452	6–12
19	April 21	Mets	0–7	Lucchesi (1–0)	**DeSclafani** (1–1)	—	**Oracle Park**	27,551	6–13
20	April 22	Mets	7–4	**Webb** (1–4)	Peterson (1–3)	—	**Oracle Park**	29,912	7–13
21	April 23	Mets	5–4	**Alexander** (2–0)	Smith (1–1)	**Doval** (2)	**Oracle Park**	27,721	8–13
22	April 24	Cardinals	4–0	**Cobb** (1–1)	Montgomery (2–3)	—	**Oracle Park**	20,203	9–13
23	April 25	Cardinals	5–4	**Hjelle** (1–0)	Helsley (0–2)	—	**Oracle Park**	20,797	10–13
24	April 26	Cardinals	7–3	**DeSclafani** (2–1)	Hicks (0–1)	**Doval** (3)	**Oracle Park**	21,748	11–13
25	April 27	Cardinals	0–6	Mikolas (1–1)	**Webb** (1–5)	—	**Oracle Park**	23,397	11–14
26	April 29	@ Padres*	11–16	Cosgrove (1–0)	**Ty. Rogers** (0–1)	—	Alfredo Harp Helú Stadium	19,611	11–15
27	April 30	@ Padres*	4–6	García (1–2)	**Ty. Rogers** (0–2)	Hader (10)	Alfredo Harp Helú Stadium	19,633	11–16
*April 29 and 30 games played in Mexico City, Mexico

May: 17–12 (Home: 9–6; Away: 8–6)

#	Date	Opponent	Score	Win	Loss	Save	Stadium	Attendance	Record
28	May 1	@ Astros	3–7	Stanek (2–1)	**Hjelle** (1–1)	—	Minute Maid Park	30,915	11–17
29	May 2	@ Astros	2–0	**DeSclafani** (3–1)	Brown (3–1)	**Doval** (4)	Minute Maid Park	31,701	12–17
30	May 3	@ Astros	4–2	**Webb** (2–5)	Valdez (2–4)	**Doval** (5)	Minute Maid Park	40,405	13–17
31	May 5	Brewers	6–4	**Manaea** (1–1)	Burnes (3–2)	**Doval** (6)	**Oracle Park**	28,614	14–17
32	May 6	Brewers	4–1	**Cobb** (2–1)	Rea (0–3)	**Doval** (7)	**Oracle Park**	26,387	15–17
33	May 7	Brewers	3–7	Payamps (1–0)	**Stripling** (0–2)	—	**Oracle Park**	34,603	15–18
34	May 8	Nationals	1–5	Irvin (1–0)	**DeSclafani** (3–2)	—	**Oracle Park**	20,502	15–19
35	May 9	Nationals	4–1	**Webb** (3–5)	Corbin (1–5)	**Doval** (8)	**Oracle Park**	22,028	16–19
36	May 10	Nationals	6–11	Gray (3–5)	**Manaea** (1–2)	—	**Oracle Park**	21,283	16–20
37	May 11	@ Diamondbacks	6–2	**Cobb** (3–1)	Henry (1–1)	—	Chase Field	15,582	17–20
38	May 12	@ Diamondbacks	5–7	Misiewicz (1–0)	**Junis** (2–2)	Castro (2)	Chase Field	19,266	17–21
39	May 13	@ Diamondbacks	2–7	Gallen (6–1)	**DeSclafani** (3–3)	—	Chase Field	25,147	17–22
40	May 14	@ Diamondbacks	1–2	Castro (2–1)	**Ty. Rogers** (0–3)	—	Chase Field	26,267	17–23
41	May 15	Phillies	6–3	**Alexander** (3–0)	Falter (0–7)	**Doval** (9)	**Oracle Park**	23,819	18–23
42	May 16	Phillies	4–3	**Ta. Rogers** (1–2)	Wheeler (3–3)	**Doval** (10)	**Oracle Park**	24,304	19–23
43	May 17	Phillies	7–4	**Brebbia** (2–0)	Soto (1–3)	**Doval** (11)	**Oracle Park**	25,303	20–23
44	May 19	Marlins	4–3	**Alexander** (4–0)	Alcántara (1–5)	**Ty. Rogers** (2)	**Oracle Park**	30,673	21–23
45	May 20	Marlins	0–1	Chargois (1–0)	**Ty. Rogers** (0–4)	Floro (5)	**Oracle Park**	31,993	21–24
46	May 21	Marlins	7–5	**Walker** (1–0)	Luzardo (3–3)	**Doval** (12)	**Oracle Park**	28,936	22–24
47	May 22	@ Twins	4–1	**Manaea** (2–2)	Ober (3–1)	**Alexander** (1)	Target Field	16,627	23–24
48	May 23	@ Twins	4–3	**Cobb** (4–1)	López (1–2)	**Doval** (13)	Target Field	20,790	24–24
49	May 24	@ Twins	1–7	Ryan (7–1)	**DeSclafani** (3–4)	—	Target Field	23,464	24–25
50	May 25	@ Brewers	5–0	**Junis** (3–2)	Teherán (0–1)	—	American Family Field	24,536	25–25
51	May 26	@ Brewers	15–1	**Wood** (1–0)	Peralta (5–4)	**Beck** (1)	American Family Field	30,347	26–25
52	May 27	@ Brewers	3–1	**Webb** (4–5)	Strzelecki (2–4)	**Doval** (14)	American Family Field	39,269	27–25
53	May 28	@ Brewers	5–7	Rea (2–3)	**Cobb** (4–2)	Williams (8)	American Family Field	34,581	27–26
54	May 29	Pirates	14–4	**DeSclafani** (4–4)	Hill (4–5)	—	**Oracle Park**	39,323	28–26
55	May 30	Pirates	1–2	Moreta (2–1)	**Manaea** (2–3)	Bednar (10)	**Oracle Park**	24,166	28–27
56	May 31	Pirates	4–9	Keller (7–1)	**Wood** (1–1)	—	**Oracle Park**	23,827	28–28

June: 18–8 (Home: 7–6; Away: 11–2)

#	Date	Opponent	Score	Win	Loss	Save	Stadium	Attendance	Record
57	June 2	Orioles	2–3	Kremer (6–2)	**Webb** (4–6)	Bautista (15)	**Oracle Park**	27,873	28–29
58	June 3	Orioles	4–0	**Cobb** (5–2)	Bradish (2–2)	—	**Oracle Park**	32,416	29–29
59	June 4	Orioles	3–8	Wells (4–2)	**DeSclafani** (4–5)	—	**Oracle Park**	35,571	29–30
60	June 6	@ Rockies	10–4	**Walker** (2–0)	Lamet (1–3)	—	Coors Field	29,190	30–30
61	June 7	@ Rockies	5–4	**Ta. Rogers** (2–2)	Lawrence (2–3)	**Doval** (15)	Coors Field	24,149	31–30
62	June 8	@ Rockies	6–4	**Alexander** (5–0)	Johnson (0–3)	**Doval** (16)	Coors Field	30,372	32–30
63	June 9	Cubs	2–3	Stroman (7–4)	**DeSclafani** (4–6)	Alzolay (3)	**Oracle Park**	34,816	32–31
64	June 10	Cubs	0–4	Hendricks (1–2)	**Junis** (3–3)	—	**Oracle Park**	35,452	32–32
65	June 11	Cubs	13–3	**Beck** (1–0)	Wesneski (2–3)	—	**Oracle Park**	36,842	33–32
66	June 12	@ Cardinals	4–3	**Webb** (5–6)	Stratton (1–1)	**Doval** (17)	Busch Stadium	40,886	34–32
67	June 13	@ Cardinals	11–3	**Jackson** (1–0)	Flaherty (3–5)	**Winn** (1)	Busch Stadium	40,917	35–32
68	June 14	@ Cardinals	8–5 (10)	**Ty. Rogers** (1–4)	Matz (0–7)	**Doval** (18)	Busch Stadium	39,165	36–32
69	June 16	@ Dodgers	7–5 (11)	**Ta. Rogers** (3–2)	Vesia (0–4)	**Junis** (1)	Dodger Stadium	49,074	37–32
70	June 17	@ Dodgers	15–0	**Wood** (2–1)	Miller (3–1)	**Beck** (1)	Dodger Stadium	51,385	38–32
71	June 18	@ Dodgers	7–3	**Webb** (6–6)	Gonsolin (4–2)	**Doval** (19)	Dodger Stadium	52,307	39–32
72	June 19	Padres	7–4 (10)	**Doval** (2–2)	Kerr (0–1)	—	**Oracle Park**	35,376	40–32
73	June 20	Padres	4–3	**Ty. Rogers** (2–4)	Martinez (3–3)	—	**Oracle Park**	32,060	41–32
74	June 21	Padres	4–2	**Hjelle** (2–1)	Darvish (5–6)	**Doval** (20)	**Oracle Park**	33,332	42–32
75	June 22	Padres	0–10	Snell (4–6)	**Wood** (2–2)	—	**Oracle Park**	38,638	42–33
76	June 23	Diamondbacks	8–5	**Webb** (7–6)	Davies (1–4)	**Doval** (21)	**Oracle Park**	31,992	43–33
77	June 24	Diamondbacks	7–6	**Ta. Rogers** (4–2)	Kelly (9–4)	**Doval** (22)	**Oracle Park**	34,343	44–33
78	June 25	Diamondbacks	2–5	Nelson (4–4)	**DeSclafani** (4–7)	McGough (6)	**Oracle Park**	35,766	44–34
79	June 27	@ Blue Jays	3–0	**Wood** (3–2)	Gausman (7–4)	**Doval** (23)	Rogers Centre	36,004	45–34
80	June 28	@ Blue Jays	1–6	Francis (1–0)	**Webb** (7–7)	—	Rogers Centre	36,685	45–35
81	June 29	@ Blue Jays	1–2	Bassitt (8–5)	**Winn** (0–1)	Romano (24)	Rogers Centre	27,761	45–36
82	June 30	@ Mets	5–4	**Manaea** (3–3)	Robertson (2–2)	**Doval** (24)	Citi Field	30,116	46–36

July: 12–13 (Home: 7–5; Away: 5–8)

#	Date	Opponent	Score	Win	Loss	Save	Stadium	Attendance	Record
83	July 1	@ Mets	1–4	Verlander (3–4)	**DeSclafani** (4–8)	Ottavino (6)	Citi Field	34,887	46–37
84	July 2	@ Mets	4–8	Hartwig (1–1)	**Wood** (3–3)	—	Citi Field	28,473	46–38
85	July 3	Mariners	5–6	Muñoz (2–1)	**Doval** (2–3)	—	**Oracle Park**	40,691	46–39
86	July 4	Mariners	0–6	Gilbert (6–5)	**Winn** (0–2)	—	**Oracle Park**	37,395	46–40
87	July 5	Mariners	2–0	**Cobb** (6–2)	Milone (0–1)	**Doval** (25)	**Oracle Park**	24,108	47–40
88	July 7	Rockies	2–5	Gomber (7–7)	**Ta. Rogers** (4–3)	Bard (1)	**Oracle Park**	33,886	47–41
89	July 8	Rockies	5–3	**Wood** (4–3)	Seabold (1–6)	**Doval** (26)	**Oracle Park**	34,568	48–41
90	July 9	Rockies	1–0	**Webb** (8–7)	Freeland (4–10)	—	**Oracle Park**	36,050	49–41
–	July 11	**93rd All-Star Game in Seattle, WA**							
91	July 14	@ Pirates	6–4	**Llovera** (1–0)	Holderman (0–2)	**Doval** (27)	PNC Park	33,813	50–41
92	July 15	@ Pirates	3–1	**Ta. Rogers** (5–3)	Mlodzinski (1–2)	**Doval** (28)	PNC Park	34,236	51–41
93	July 16	@ Pirates	8–4 (10)	**Walker** (3–0)	De Los Santos (0–1)	—	PNC Park	21,642	52–41
—	July 17	@ Reds	Suspended (rain); Resuming: July 18						
94	July 18 (1)	@ Reds	4–2 (10)	**Ty. Rogers** (3–4)	Gibaut (8–2)	**Doval** (29)	Great American Ball Park	19,229	53–41
95	July 18 (2)	@ Reds	11–10	**Alexander** (6–0)	Farmer (2–4)	**Doval** (30)	Great American Ball Park	26,569	54–41
96	July 19	@ Reds	2–3	Ashcraft (5–7)	**Stripling** (0–3)	Díaz (27)	Great American Ball Park	19,205	54–42
97	July 20	@ Reds	1–5	Abbott (5–2)	**Cobb** (6–3)	—	Great American Ball Park	27,829	54–43
98	July 21	@ Nationals	3–5	Irvin (3–5)	**Wood** (4–4)	Finnegan (13)	Nationals Park	26,062	54–44
99	July 22	@ Nationals	1–10	Gray (7–8)	**Webb** (8–8)	—	Nationals Park	32,504	54–45
100	July 23	@ Nationals	1–6	Gore (6–7)	**Alexander** (6–1)	—	Nationals Park	23,404	54–46
101	July 24	@ Tigers	1–5	Skubal (1–1)	**Stripling** (0–4)	—	Comerica Park	16,907	54–47
102	July 25	Athletics	2–1	**Ty. Rogers** (4–4)	Erceg (2–2)	**Doval** (31)	**Oracle Park**	40,014	55–47
103	July 26	Athletics	8–3	**Wood** (5–4)	Harris (2–5)	—	**Oracle Park**	36,142	56–47
104	July 28	Red Sox	2–3	Crawford (5–5)	**Webb** (8–9)	Jansen (23)	**Oracle Park**	33,755	56–48
105	July 29	Red Sox	3–2	**Doval** (3–3)	Jansen (2–5)	—	**Oracle Park**	37,470	57–48
106	July 30	Red Sox	4–3 (11)	**Beck** (2–0)	Llovera (1–1)	—	**Oracle Park**	37,026	58–48
107	July 31	Diamondbacks	3–4 (11)	Ginkel (5–0)	**Ta. Rogers** (5–4)	McGough (9)	**Oracle Park**	28,404	58–49

August: 12–15 (Home: 8–7; Away: 4–8)

#	Date	Opponent	Score	Win	Loss	Save	Stadium	Attendance	Record
108	August 1	Diamondbacks	4–3	**Walker** (4–0)	Castro (5–5)	**Manaea** (1)	**Oracle Park**	25,806	59–49
109	August 2	Diamondbacks	4–2	**Webb** (9–9)	Gilbert (0–2)	**Doval** (32)	**Oracle Park**	28,956	60–49
110	August 3	Diamondbacks	1–0	**Beck** (3–0)	Pfaadt (0–5)	**Doval** (33)	**Oracle Park**	33,087	61–49
111	August 5	@ Athletics	1–2	May (3–4)	**Walker** (4–1)	—	Oakland Coliseum	37,553	61–50
112	August 6	@ Athletics	6–8	Snead (1–0)	**Jackson** (1–1)	May (11)	Oakland Coliseum	27,381	61–51
113	August 7	@ Angels	8–3	**Ta. Rogers** (6–4)	Estévez (5–3)	—	Angel Stadium	32,582	62–51
114	August 8	@ Angels	5–7	Giolito (7–8)	**Alexander** (6–2)	Leone (1)	Angel Stadium	31,974	62–52
115	August 9	@ Angels	1–4	Ohtani (10–5)	**Beck** (3–1)	Estévez (24)	Angel Stadium	36,980	62–53
116	August 11	Rangers	1–2	Gray (8–5)	**Stripling** (0–5)	Smith (22)	**Oracle Park**	35,689	62–54
117	August 12	Rangers	3–9	Anderson (2–1)	**Cobb** (6–4)	—	**Oracle Park**	33,112	62–55
118	August 13	Rangers	3–2 (10)	**Doval** (4–3)	Smith (1–4)	—	**Oracle Park**	35,648	63–55
119	August 14	Rays	2–10	Glasnow (6–3)	**Beck** (3–2)	Lopez (1)	**Oracle Park**	25,748	63–56
120	August 15	Rays	7–0	**Manaea** (4–3)	Littell (2–4)	—	**Oracle Park**	26,322	64–56
121	August 16	Rays	1–6	Civale (6–3)	**Walker** (4–2)	—	**Oracle Park**	27,510	64–57
122	August 18	@ Braves	0–4	Strider (14–4)	**Cobb** (6–5)	—	Truist Park	40,688	64–58
123	August 19	@ Braves	5–6	Yates (7–0)	**Ty. Rogers** (4–5)	Iglesias (24)	Truist Park	42,744	64–59
124	August 20	@ Braves	4–3	**Doval** (5–3)	Yates (7–1)	—	Truist Park	40,291	65–59
125	August 21	@ Phillies	4–10	Nola (11–8)	**Manaea** (4–4)	—	Citizens Bank Park	36,274	65–60
126	August 22	@ Phillies	3–4	Kimbrel (7–3)	**Doval** (5–4)	—	Citizens Bank Park	40,420	65–61
127	August 23	@ Phillies	8–6 (10)	**Junis** (4–3)	Kimbrel (7–4)	**Walker** (1)	Citizens Bank Park	33,035	66–61
128	August 25	Braves	1–5	Strider (15–4)	**Webb** (9–10)	—	**Oracle Park**	36,511	66–62
129	August 26	Braves	3–7	Fried (5–1)	**Manaea** (4–5)	—	**Oracle Park**	36,798	66–63
130	August 27	Braves	8–5	**Alexander** (7–2)	Shuster (4–3)	**Doval** (34)	**Oracle Park**	31,047	67–63
131	August 28	Reds	4–1	**Harrison** (1–0)	Abbott (8–4)	**Doval** (35)	**Oracle Park**	24,581	68–63
132	August 29	Reds	6–1	**Cobb** (7–5)	Williamson (4–4)	—	**Oracle Park**	26,078	69–63
133	August 30	Reds	1–4	Greene (3–6)	**Webb** (9–11)	Díaz (35)	**Oracle Park**	25,140	69–64
134	August 31	@ Padres	7–2	**Manaea** (5–5)	Ávila (0–2)	—	Petco Park	36,639	70–64

September/October: 9–19 (Home: 7–5; Away: 2–14)

#	Date	Opponent	Score	Win	Loss	Save	Stadium	Attendance	Record
135	September 1	@ Padres	3–7	Wacha (11–2)	**Beck** (3–3)	—	Petco Park	40,326	70–65
136	September 2	@ Padres	1–6	Snell (12–9)	**Harrison** (1–1)	—	Petco Park	41,983	70–66
137	September 3	@ Padres	0–4	Lugo (6–6)	**Cobb** (7–6)	—	Petco Park	41,050	70–67
138	September 4	@ Cubs	0–5	Steele (16–3)	**Webb** (9–12)	—	Wrigley Field	39,452	70–68
139	September 5	@ Cubs	8–11	Smyly (10–9)	**Jackson** (1–2)	—	Wrigley Field	28,684	70–69
140	September 6	@ Cubs	2–8	Wicks (3–0)	**Wood** (5–5)	—	Wrigley Field	27,443	70–70
141	September 8	Rockies	9–8	**Brebbia** (3–0)	Bird (2–3)	**Doval** (36)	**Oracle Park**	32,448	71–70
142	September 9	Rockies	9–1	**Webb** (10–12)	Anderson (0–5)	—	**Oracle Park**	34,290	72–70
143	September 10	Rockies	6–3	**Winn** (1–2)	Lambert (3–7)	**Doval** (37)	**Oracle Park**	33,781	73–70
144	September 11	Guardians	5–4 (10)	**Jackson** (2–2)	Clase (2–9)	—	**Oracle Park**	20,705	74–70
145	September 12	Guardians	1–3	Quantrill (3–6)	**Manaea** (5–6)	Clase (40)	**Oracle Park**	23,541	74–71
146	September 13	Guardians	6–5 (10)	**Doval** (6–4)	Curry (3–4)	—	**Oracle Park**	26,218	75–71
—	September 14	@ Rockies	Postponed (inclement weather); Makeup: September 16						
147	September 15	@ Rockies	2–3	Koch (3–2)	**Doval** (6–5)	—	Coors Field	38,253	75–72
148	September 16 (1)	@ Rockies	5–9	Kauffman (2–4)	**Walker** (4–3)	Hollowell (1)	Coors Field	22,101	75–73
149	September 16 (2)	@ Rockies	2–5	Vodnik (1–0)	**Alexander** (7–3)	Kinley (3)	Coors Field	43,885	75–74
150	September 17	@ Rockies	11–10	**Manaea** (6–6)	Flexen (1–8)	**Ta. Rogers** (2)	Coors Field	30,619	76–74
151	September 19	@ Diamondbacks	4–8	Gallen (16–8)	**Cobb** (7–7)	—	Chase Field	26,093	76–75
152	September 20	@ Diamondbacks	1–7	Kelly (12–7)	**Webb** (10–13)	—	Chase Field	16,848	76–76
153	September 21	@ Dodgers	2–7	Miller (2–0)	**Brebbia** (3–1)	—	Dodger Stadium	43,942	76–77
154	September 22	@ Dodgers	5–1	**Manaea** (7–6)	Stone (1–1)	**Doval** (38)	Dodger Stadium	52,887	77–77
155	September 23	@ Dodgers	0–7	Kershaw (13–4)	**Brebbia** (3–2)	—	Dodger Stadium	52,704	77–78
156	September 24	@ Dodgers	2–3 (10)	Miller (3–0)	**Doval** (6–6)	—	Dodger Stadium	48,315	77–79
157	September 25	Padres	2–1	**Webb** (11–13)	Suárez (4–3)	—	**Oracle Park**	28,557	78–79
158	September 26	Padres	0–4	Lugo (8–7)	**Brebbia** (3–3)	Hader (32)	**Oracle Park**	28,183	78–80
159	September 27	Padres	2–5 (10)	Hader (2–3)	**Brebbia** (3–4)	Cosgrove (1)	**Oracle Park**	32,151	78–81
160	September 29	Dodgers	2–6	Lynn (13–11)	**Winn** (1–3)	—	**Oracle Park**	38,159	78–82
161	September 30	Dodgers	2–1	**Walker** (5–3)	Kershaw (13–5)	**Doval** (39)	**Oracle Park**	39,253	79–82
162	October 1	Dodgers	2–5	González (3–3)	**Brebbia** (3–5)	Phillips (24)	**Oracle Park**	38,359	79–83

== Season standings ==
=== National League West ===
NL West
Team	W	L	Pct.	GB	Home	Road
Los Angeles Dodgers	100	62	.617	—	53‍–‍28	47‍–‍34
Arizona Diamondbacks	84	78	.519	16	43‍–‍38	41‍–‍40
San Diego Padres	82	80	.506	18	44‍–‍37	38‍–‍43
San Francisco Giants	79	83	.488	21	45‍–‍36	34‍–‍47
Colorado Rockies	59	103	.364	41	37‍–‍44	22‍–‍59

=== National League Wild Card ===
Division leaders
Team	W	L	Pct.
Atlanta Braves	104	58	.642
Los Angeles Dodgers	100	62	.617
Milwaukee Brewers	92	70	.568

Wild Card teams (Top 3 teams qualify for postseason)
Team	W	L	Pct.	GB
Philadelphia Phillies	90	72	.556	+6
Miami Marlins	84	78	.519	—
Arizona Diamondbacks	84	78	.519	—
Chicago Cubs	83	79	.512	1
San Diego Padres	82	80	.506	2
Cincinnati Reds	82	80	.506	2
San Francisco Giants	79	83	.488	5
Pittsburgh Pirates	76	86	.469	8
New York Mets	75	87	.463	9
St. Louis Cardinals	71	91	.438	13
Washington Nationals	71	91	.438	13
Colorado Rockies	59	103	.364	25

=== Record vs. opponents ===
==== Record vs. National League ====
2023 National League record Source: MLB Standings Grid – 2023
Team	AZ	ATL	CHC	CIN	COL	LAD	MIA	MIL	NYM	PHI	PIT	SD	SF	STL	WSH	AL
Arizona	—	3–3	6–1	3–4	10–3	5–8	2–4	4–2	1–6	3–4	4–2	7–6	7–6	3–3	5–1	21–25
Atlanta	3–3	—	4–2	5–1	7–0	4–3	9–4	5–1	10–3	8–5	4–3	3–4	4–2	4–2	8–5	26–20
Chicago	1–6	2–4	—	6–7	4–2	3–4	2–4	6–7	3–3	1–5	10–3	4–3	5–1	8–5	3–4	25–21
Cincinnati	4–3	1–5	7–6	—	4–2	4–2	3–3	3–10	4–2	3–4	5–8	3–3	3–4	6–7	4–3	28–18
Colorado	3–10	0–7	2–4	2–4	—	3–10	5–2	4–2	4–2	2–5	2–4	4–9	4–9	3–3	3–4	18–28
Los Angeles	8–5	3–4	4–3	2–4	10–3	—	3–3	5–1	3–3	4–2	4–3	9–4	7–6	4–3	4–2	30–16
Miami	4–2	4–9	4–2	3–3	2–5	3–3	—	3–4	4–8	7–6	5–2	2–4	3–3	3–4	11–2	26–20
Milwaukee	2–4	1–5	7–6	10–3	2–4	1–5	4–3	—	6–1	4–2	8–5	6–1	2–5	8–5	3–3	28–18
New York	6–1	3–10	3–3	2–4	2–4	3–3	8–4	1–6	—	6–7	3–3	3–3	4–3	4–3	7–6	19–27
Philadelphia	4–3	5–8	5–1	4–3	5–2	2–4	6–7	2–4	7–6	—	3–3	5–2	2–4	5–1	7–6	28–18
Pittsburgh	2–4	3–4	3–10	8–5	4–2	3–4	2–5	5–8	3–3	3–3	—	5–1	2–4	9–4	5–2	19–27
San Diego	6–7	4–3	3–4	3–3	9–4	4–9	4–2	1–6	3–3	2–5	1–5	—	8–5	3–3	3–3	28–18
San Francisco	6–7	2–4	1–5	4–3	9–4	6–7	3–3	5–2	3–4	4–2	4–2	5–8	—	6–1	1–5	20–26
St. Louis	3–3	2–4	5–8	7–6	3–3	3–4	4–3	5–8	3–4	1–5	4–9	3–3	1–6	—	4–2	23–23
Washington	1–5	5–8	4–3	3–4	4–3	2–4	2–11	3–3	6–7	6–7	2–5	3–3	5–1	2–4	—	23–23

Updated with the results of all games through October 1, 2023.

==== Record vs. American League ====
2023 National League record vs. American League Source: MLB Standings
Team	BAL	BOS	CWS	CLE	DET	HOU	KC	LAA	MIN	NYY	OAK	SEA	TB	TEX	TOR
Arizona	1–2	1–2	2–1	2–1	3–0	0–3	2–1	2–1	0–3	1–2	2–1	1–2	1–2	3–1	0–3
Atlanta	2–1	1–3	1–2	2–1	2–1	0–3	3–0	2–1	3–0	3–0	1–2	2–1	2–1	2–1	0–3
Chicago	2–1	1–2	3–1	1–2	2–1	0–3	2–1	0–3	1–2	2–1	3–0	2–1	2–1	2–1	2–1
Cincinnati	2–1	2–1	1–2	2–2	2–1	3–0	3–0	3–0	1–2	0–3	2–1	2–1	1–2	3–0	1–2
Colorado	1–2	2–1	2–1	2–1	1–2	1–3	2–1	2–1	1–2	2–1	1–2	0–3	0–3	0–3	1–2
Los Angeles	2–1	2–1	2–1	2–1	2–1	2–1	1–2	4–0	2–1	1–2	3–0	3–0	1–2	2–1	1–2
Miami	0–3	3–0	2–1	2–1	2–1	1–2	3–0	3–0	2–1	2–1	3–0	1–2	1–3	0–3	1–2
Milwaukee	2–1	1–2	3–0	2–1	1–2	2–1	3–0	2–1	2–2	2–1	0–3	3–0	1–2	3–0	1–2
New York	0–3	1–2	2–1	3–0	0–3	1–2	0–3	1–2	1–2	2–2	3–0	2–1	2–1	1–2	0–3
Philadelphia	2–1	1–2	2–1	1–2	3–0	2–1	2–1	2–1	1–2	1–2	3–0	2–1	3–0	0–3	3–1
Pittsburgh	1–2	3–0	2–1	1–2	2–2	1–2	3–0	1–2	1–2	1–2	1–2	1–2	0–3	1–2	0–3
San Diego	2–1	1–2	3–0	2–1	2–1	1–2	1–2	3–0	1–2	1–2	3–0	1–3	2–1	3–0	2–1
San Francisco	1–2	2–1	2–1	2–1	0–3	2–1	1–2	1–2	2–1	1–2	2–2	1–2	1–2	1–2	1–2
St. Louis	2–1	3–0	2–1	1–2	1–2	1–2	2–2	0–3	1–2	2–1	2–1	1–2	2–1	1–2	2–1
Washington	0–4	2–1	2–1	1–2	2–1	1–2	2–1	1–2	2–1	2–1	3–0	2–1	0–3	2–1	1–2

Updated with the results of all games through October 1, 2023.

== Roster ==
2023 San Francisco Giants
Roster
Pitchers: 54 Scott Alexander; 45 Matt Beaty; 43 Tristan Beck; 59 John Brebbia; 38 Alex Cobb; 26 Anthony DeSclafani; 75 Camilo Doval; 45 Kyle Harrison; 64 Sean Hjelle; 77 Luke Jackson; 34 Jakob Junis; 63 Mauricio Llovera; 52 Sean Manaea; 33 Taylor Rogers; 71 Tyler Rogers; 48 Ross Stripling; 56 Cole Waites; 74 Ryan Walker; 62 Logan Webb; 67 Keaton Winn; 57 Alex Wood	Catchers: 14 Patrick Bailey; 21 Joey Bart; 1 Roberto Pérez; 2 Blake Sabol; 14 Austin Wynns; Infielders: 10 Johan Camargo; 35 Brandon Crawford; 7 J. D. Davis; 18 Paul DeJong; 10 Isan Díaz; 39 Thairo Estrada; 41 Wilmer Flores; 37 Marco Luciano; 46 Mark Mathias; 6 Casey Schmitt; 32 David Villar; 31 LaMonte Wade Jr.; 70 Brett Wisely	Outfielders: 8 Michael Conforto; 49 Tyler Fitzgerald; 17 Mitch Haniger; 58 Bryce Johnson; 29 Luis Matos; 53 Wade Meckler; 23 Joc Pederson; 16 A. J. Pollock; 12 Heliot Ramos; 13 Austin Slater; 37 Cal Stevenson; 5 Mike Yastrzemski; Other batters: 18 Darin Ruf	Manager: 50 Kai Correa (interim); 19 Gabe Kapler; Coaches: 0 Craig Albernaz (bullpen, catching); 84 Andrew Bailey (pitching); 97 Brian Bannister (pitching director); 95 Alex Burg (bullpen catcher); 50 Kai Correa (bench); 85 Pedro Guerrero (assistant hitting); 91 Mark Hallberg (third base); 88 Dustin Lind (director of hitting); 87 J. P. Martinez (assistant pitching); 92 Alyssa Nakken (special assistant); 79 Nick Ortiz (quality control); 98 Fernando Perez (video coach); 00 Antoan Richardson (first base); 77 Justin Viele (hitting); 96 Brant Whiting (bullpen); 99 Taira Uematsu (assistant coach)

== Player statistics ==
= Indicates team leader

= Indicates league leader

=== Batting ===
Note: G = Games played; AB = At bats; R = Runs; H = Hits; 2B = Doubles; 3B = Triples; HR = Home runs; RBI = Runs batted in; SB = Stolen bases; BB = Walks; AVG = Batting average; SLG = Slugging average

Player	G	AB	R	H	2B	3B	HR	RBI	SB	BB	AVG	SLG
Thairo Estrada	120	495	63	134	26	2	14	49	23	22	.271	.416
J. D. Davis	144	480	61	119	23	1	18	69	1	52	.248	.413
LaMonte Wade Jr.	135	429	64	110	14	2	17	45	2	76	.256	.417
Michael Conforto	125	406	58	97	14	0	15	58	4	53	.239	.384
Wilmer Flores	126	405	51	115	22	0	23	60	0	41	.284	.509
Joc Pederson	121	358	59	84	14	3	15	51	0	57	.235	.416
Mike Yastrzemski	106	330	54	77	23	1	15	43	2	45	.233	.445
Patrick Bailey	97	326	29	76	18	1	7	48	1	21	.233	.359
Blake Sabol	110	310	36	73	10	0	13	44	4	24	.235	.394
Brandon Crawford	93	283	31	55	11	1	7	38	3	28	.194	.314
Casey Schmitt	90	253	28	52	15	0	5	30	2	13	.206	.324
Luis Matos	76	228	24	57	13	1	2	14	3	20	.250	.342
Mitch Haniger	61	211	27	44	13	1	6	28	1	15	.209	.365
Austin Slater	89	185	24	50	9	0	5	20	2	20	.270	.400
David Villar	46	124	15	18	6	0	5	12	1	11	.145	.315
Brett Wisely	51	120	10	21	5	0	2	8	2	9	.175	.267
Joey Bart	30	87	9	18	5	0	0	5	0	3	.207	.264
Wade Meckler	20	56	6	13	1	0	0	4	0	6	.232	.250
Heliot Ramos	25	56	5	10	4	0	1	2	0	4	.179	.304
Paul DeJong	18	49	2	9	2	0	1	5	0	0	.184	.286
Bryce Johnson	30	43	7	7	1	0	1	3	3	4	.163	.256
Marco Luciano	14	39	4	9	3	0	0	0	1	6	.231	.308
Tyler Fitzgerald	10	32	3	7	2	0	2	5	2	2	.219	.469
Darin Ruf	9	23	1	6	2	0	0	3	0	4	.261	.348
Isan Díaz	6	19	0	1	0	0	0	1	0	2	.053	.053
Johan Camargo	8	18	0	4	0	0	0	2	0	1	.222	.222
Roberto Pérez	5	15	0	2	0	0	0	1	0	2	.133	.133
Mark Mathias	5	10	1	2	0	0	0	2	0	0	.200	.200
Cal Stevenson	6	9	1	0	0	0	0	0	0	3	.000	.000
A. J. Pollock	5	6	0	0	0	0	0	0	0	0	.000	.000
Matt Beaty	4	5	1	1	0	0	0	1	0	0	.200	.200
Austin Wynns	1	2	0	0	0	0	0	0	0	0	.000	.000
Totals	162	5412	674	1271	256	13	174	651	57	544	.235	.383
Rank in NL	—	11	14	15	14	14	9	14	15	8	15	15

Source:Baseball Reference

=== Pitching ===
Note: W = Wins; L = Losses; ERA = Earned run average; G = Games pitched; GS = Games started; SV = Saves; IP = Innings pitched; H = Hits allowed; R = Runs allowed; ER = Earned runs allowed; BB = Walks allowed; SO = Strikeouts

Player	W	L	ERA	G	GS	SV	IP	H	R	ER	BB	SO
Logan Webb	11	13	3.25	33	33	0	216.0	201	83	78	31	194
Alex Cobb	7	7	3.87	28	28	0	151.1	163	69	65	37	131
Sean Manaea	7	6	4.44	37	10	1	117.2	104	68	58	42	128
Anthony DeSclafani	4	8	4.88	19	18	0	99.2	105	59	54	20	79
Alex Wood	5	5	4.33	29	12	0	97.2	98	52	47	42	74
Ross Stripling	0	5	5.36	22	11	0	89.0	104	54	53	16	70
Jakob Junis	4	3	3.87	40	4	1	86.0	90	42	37	21	96
Tristan Beck	3	3	3.92	33	3	2	85.0	83	40	37	21	68
Tyler Rogers	4	5	3.04	68	0	2	74.0	66	27	25	19	60
Camilo Doval	6	6	2.93	69	0	39	67.2	51	32	22	26	87
Ryan Walker	5	3	3.23	49	13	1	61.1	61	25	22	24	78
Taylor Rogers	6	4	3.83	60	0	2	51.2	39	27	22	25	64
Scott Alexander	7	3	4.66	55	8	1	48.1	55	30	25	11	31
Keaton Winn	1	3	4.68	9	5	1	42.1	36	22	22	8	35
John Brebbia	3	5	3.99	40	10	0	38.1	31	21	17	14	47
Kyle Harrison	1	1	4.15	7	7	0	34.2	29	19	16	11	35
Luke Jackson	2	2	2.97	33	0	0	33.1	26	14	11	15	43
Sean Hjelle	2	1	6.52	15	0	0	29.0	38	25	21	13	31
Mauricio Llovera	1	0	1.69	5	0	0	5.1	4	1	1	2	5
Cole Waites	0	0	15.43	3	0	0	2.1	6	5	4	2	2
Brandon Crawford	0	0	0.00	1	0	0	1.0	1	0	0	1	0
Brett Wisely	0	0	9.00	1	0	0	1.0	1	1	1	0	0
David Villar	0	0	0.00	1	0	0	1.0	0	0	0	1	0
Matt Beaty	0	0	27.00	1	0	0	1.0	3	3	3	1	1
Totals	79	83	4.02	162	162	50	1434.2	1395	719	641	403	1359
Rank in NL	10	6	3	—	—	3	10	11	6	3	1	11

Source:Baseball Reference

== Farm system ==
Level	Team	League	Division	Manager	Record Type	Record	through
AAA	Sacramento River Cats	Pacific Coast League	West	Dave Brundage			
AA	Richmond Flying Squirrels	Eastern League	Southwest	Dennis Pelfrey			
High-A	Eugene Emeralds	Northwest League	N/A	Carlos Valderrama			
Low-A	San Jose Giants	California League	North	Jeremiah Knackstedt			
Rookie	ACL Giants Black	Arizona Complex League	East				
Rookie	ACL Giants Orange	Arizona Complex League	East				
Foreign Rookie	DSL Giants Black	Dominican Summer League	San Pedro				
Foreign Rookie	DSL Giants Orange	Dominican Summer League	Northeast				
