= Tristan Beck =

American baseball player (born 1996)

LG Twins
- Pitcher
- Born: June 24, 1996 (age 30); Corona, California, U.S.
- Bats: Right Throws: Right

MLB debut
- April 20, 2023, for the San Francisco Giants

MLB statistics (through 2026 season)
- Win–loss record: 5–3
- Earned run average: 4.08
- Strikeouts: 132
- Stats at Baseball Reference

Teams
- San Francisco Giants (2023–2026)

Tristan Robert Beck (born June 24, 1996) is an American professional baseball pitcher for the LG Twins of the KBO League. He has previously played in Major League Baseball (MLB) for the San Francisco Giants. He played college baseball for the Stanford Cardinal. The Atlanta Braves selected Beck in the fourth round of the 2018 MLB draft, and traded him to the Giants in 2019. He made his MLB debut in 2023.

== High school ==
Beck attended Corona High School in Corona, California, and was on the varsity baseball team for four years, was two-time team captain, three-time All-Conference, and four-time All-Academic. He played for the team as a pitcher and center fielder, and committed to attend Stanford University in order to play college baseball for the Stanford Cardinal. He pitched to a 7–1 win-loss record and a 0.65 earned run average (ERA) with 82 strikeouts and 18 walks in 65 innings pitched as a senior. He ended his high school career with a 19–4 record and a 1.23 ERA, throwing two no-hitters. He was First Team All State and All Section in 2015. Beck also was the starting quarterback on Corona’s football team for two seasons.

== College ==
Though eligible for the 2015 MLB draft and projected to be selected in the first round by Baseball America, Beck decided to fulfill his commitment to attend Stanford, and informed teams that he would not sign. The Milwaukee Brewers nevertheless selected him in the 34th round, and he did not sign. He played collegiate summer baseball for the PUF Capitalists of the California Collegiate League, and then enrolled at Stanford.

As a freshman in 2016, Beck started for the Cardinal on Opening Day, become the third freshman to do so after pitchers Mike Mussina and Cal Quantrill. Over 14 starts, he went 6–5 with a 2.48 ERA. Beck was named First Team All-Pac-12 Conference, a Freshman All-American by Collegiate Baseball, a Perfect Game/Rawlings First-Team Freshman All-American, a Baseball America First-Team Freshman All-American, and a Louisville Slugger Freshman All-American.

Beck suffered a stress fracture in his back in 2017, and missed the entire season. As he was a draft-eligible sophomore, the New York Yankees selected Beck in the 29th round of the 2017 MLB draft. Beck opted to return to Stanford for his junior year. In 2018, Beck went 8–4 with a 2.98 ERA over 15 starts. He was named All-Pac-12.

== Professional career ==
=== Atlanta Braves ===
The Atlanta Braves selected Beck in the fourth round of the 2018 MLB draft. He signed for a signing bonus of $900,000, and spent his first professional season with the Gulf Coast League Braves, pitching 4 2/3 scoreless innings. Beck began 2019 with the Florida Fire Frogs, pitching to a 2–2 record with a 5.65 ERA over eight starts, and 36 2/3 innings in which he struck out 39 batters, and then nine innings over two starts for the GCL Braves in which he gave up four earned runs and struck out 14 batters.

=== San Francisco Giants ===
On July 31, 2019, the Braves traded Beck and Daniel Winkler to the San Francisco Giants in exchange for relief pitcher Mark Melancon. Beck was assigned to the San Jose Giants, and spent the remainder of the year there, going 3–2 with a 2.27 ERA over six starts, in 35 2/3 innings striking out 37 batters. He was selected to play in the Arizona Fall League for the Scottsdale Scorpions following the 2019 season, and was 1–2 with a 3.63 ERA in 22 1/3 innings in which he struck out 23 batters. Beck did not play professionally in 2020 due to the cancellation of the minor league season because of the COVID-19 pandemic.

Beck began the 2021 season with the Richmond Flying Squirrels of Double-A Northeast. Playing for Giants Black, San Jose, and Richmond he was 4–5 with a 6.27 ERA in 12 games (10 starts) in which he pitched 37 1/3 innings and struck out 29 batters. In 2022, he pitched for Richmond and the Sacramento River Cats of the Triple-A Pacific Coast League. He was a combined 5–9 with a 5.25 ERA as in 23 games (22 starts) he pitched 111 1/3 innings and struck out 116 batters. On November 15, 2022, the Giants added Beck to their 40-man roster to protect him from being eligible in the Rule 5 draft.

The Giants optioned to Triple-A Sacramento to begin the 2023 season. On April 19, Beck was promoted to the major leagues for the first time after Alex Wood was placed on the injured list. He made his major league debut on April 20, tossing 5 1/3 innings of relief against the New York Mets. In 33 appearances for San Francisco, Beck logged a 3.92 ERA with 68 strikeouts and 2 saves across 85 innings pitched.

On March 2, 2024, it was announced that Beck would undergo surgery to remove an aneurysm from the upper part of his pitching arm. He was transferred to the 60–day injured list the following day. Beck was activated on September 1. In 7 appearances for San Francisco, he compiled a 1.69 ERA with 14 strikeouts over 16 innings of work.

Beck was optioned to Triple-A Sacramento to begin the 2025 season. He was recalled to the majors for the first time in 2025 on May 23, after Justin Verlander was placed on the 15-day injured list. Beck appeared in 31 games for San Francisco, including one start, finishing with a 4.61 ERA, two saves, and 41 strikouts across 56 2/3 innings.

Beck was optioned to Triple-A Sacramento to begin the 2026 season. He made 14 appearances for the Giants, posting an 1–0 record and 5.21 ERA with nine strikeouts and one saves across 19 innings pitched. On November 2, 2026, Beck was released by the Giants.

=== LG Twins ===
On November 4, 2026, Beck signed with the LG Twins of the KBO League.

== International career ==
Beck played for the Great Britain national baseball team in the 2026 World Baseball Classic.

== Personal life ==
Beck's mother and older sister graduated from Stanford University. Beck and his younger brother, Brendan, played baseball together for Corona High and Stanford.
