= Gabe Kapler =

American baseball player, manager, and executive (born 1975)

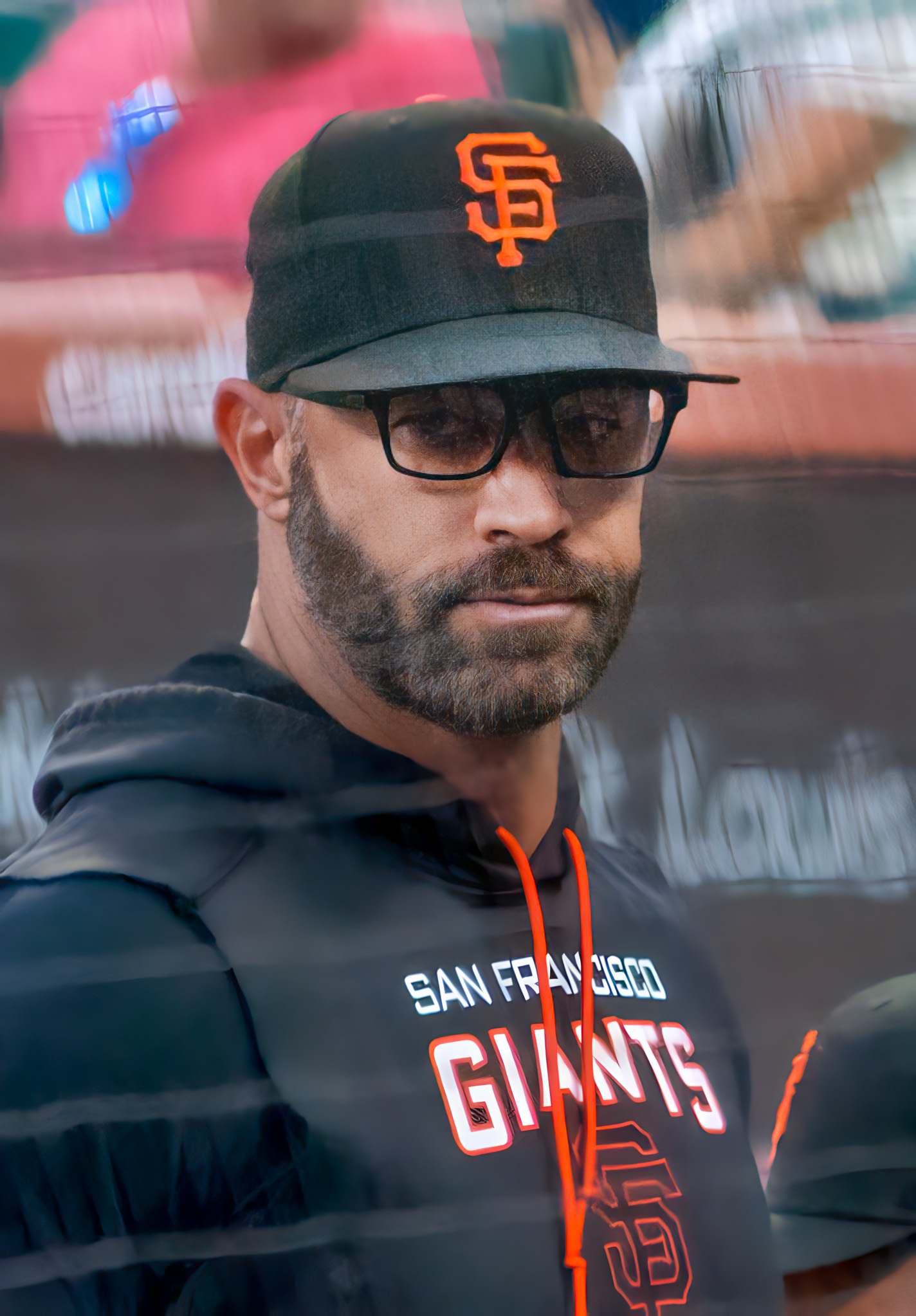
- Kapler with the Giants in 2023

Miami Marlins
- Outfielder / Manager / General manager
- Born: July 31, 1975 (age 51); Los Angeles, California, U.S.
- Batted: Right Threw: Right

Professional debut
- MLB: September 20, 1998, for the Detroit Tigers
- NPB: April 1, 2005, for the Yomiuri Giants

Last appearance
- NPB: May 25, 2005, for the Yomiuri Giants
- MLB: August 14, 2010, for the Tampa Bay Rays

MLB statistics
- Batting average: .268
- Home runs: 82
- Runs batted in: 386
- Managerial record: 456–411
- Winning %: .526

NPB statistics
- Batting average: .153
- Home runs: 3
- Runs batted in: 6
- Stats at Baseball Reference
- Managerial record at Baseball Reference

Teams
- As player: Detroit Tigers (1998–1999); Texas Rangers (2000–2002); Colorado Rockies (2002–2003); Boston Red Sox (2003–2004); Yomiuri Giants (2005); Boston Red Sox (2005–2006); Milwaukee Brewers (2008); Tampa Bay Rays (2009–2010); As manager: Philadelphia Phillies (2018–2019); San Francisco Giants (2020–2023); As general manager: Miami Marlins (2025–present)

Career highlights and awards
- World Series champion (2004); NL Manager of the Year (2021)

Gabriel Stefan Kapler (born July 31, 1975), nicknamed "Kap", is an American professional baseball executive and former outfielder and manager who serves as the general manager of the Miami Marlins of Major League Baseball (MLB).

Kapler was a 57th-round draft pick (1,487th overall) by the Detroit Tigers in the 1995 MLB draft. In the minor leagues, he was an All-Star in 1996, 1997, and 1998, and was recognized by national publications as Minor League Player of the Year in 1998.

He played in the major leagues from 1998 to 2010, for the Tigers, Texas Rangers, Colorado Rockies, Boston Red Sox, Milwaukee Brewers, and Tampa Bay Rays (except for the 2007 season, which — having briefly retired as a player — he spent managing the Greenville Drive of the South Atlantic League, the Single-A affiliate of the Red Sox). Kapler also spent part of the 2005 season playing for the Yomiuri Giants in Nippon Professional Baseball's Central League.

After permanently retiring as a player, Kapler served as a coach for the Israeli national baseball team in the 2013 World Baseball Classic, and as Director of Player Development for the Dodgers from 2014 through 2017. He was the manager of the Philadelphia Phillies in 2018 and 2019. He became the manager of the San Francisco Giants in 2020, and led them to a franchise-record 107 wins and the NL West title in 2021. Kapler was named the 2021 National League Manager of the Year. ESPN described him as "an analytically savvy, outside-the-box thinker who [can] also relate well to players." The Giants fired Kapler towards the end of the 2023 season. In December 2023, Kapler became an assistant general manager of the Miami Marlins of MLB.

== Early life ==
Gabriel Stefan Kapler was born on July 31, 1975, in Hollywood, Los Angeles, California to a Jewish family. His father, Michael, was a classical pianist originally from Brooklyn, New York who also wrote music and taught piano. His mother, Judy, is an early childhood educator at a Jewish preschool who is originally from Bensonhurst, Brooklyn. They met while working in the antiwar movement of the 1960s and moved to California in the 1970s. Kapler and his brother Jeremy attended The Country School, due to their father's position on the faculty as a music teacher.

At the age of eight, he was hit by a car and needed therapy to overcome his fear of crossing streets. He grew up in middle-class Reseda, Los Angeles, in the San Fernando Valley, where he was the smallest player on his Reseda Little League team.

Kapler attended William Howard Taft Charter High School in Woodland Hills, Los Angeles. He played shortstop, second base, and third base for its baseball team, hitting .313 in his senior season, and graduated in 1993 at age 17. In his four seasons of high school baseball, he never hit a home run. During the summer, he batted .350 with 4 home runs and 30 runs batted in (RBIs) for the Woodland Hills East American Legion team.

== College career ==
Kapler attended Cal State-Fullerton in fall 1993 on scholarship for one semester, before transferring to Moorpark College in the fall of 1994. He was named First Team All-Western State Conference after batting .337 with seven home runs and 52 RBIs. He was inducted into the Moorpark College Athletic Hall of Fame in 2008.

== Professional career ==
=== Draft and minor leagues ===
Kapler was the 57th-round draft pick (1,487th overall) of the Detroit Tigers in the 1995 Major League Baseball draft. He was signed by scout Dennis Lieberthal, father of former Phillies catcher Mike Lieberthal, after being offered a $10,000 signing bonus. Playing 63 games for the Jamestown Jammers after he signed, he tied for second in the Class A- New York–Penn League in doubles (with 19), fifth in extra-base hits (27), and batted .288/.351/.453.

In 1996, with the Fayetteville Generals, Kapler led the Class A South Atlantic League in hits (157), doubles (45; 2nd in the minor leagues), extra-base hits (71) and total bases (280), was second in homers (26), RBIs (99) and slugging (.534), 5th in batting (.300), 7th in runs (81) and 10th in on-base percentage (.380). He made the South Atlantic League All-Star team. He then played for the West Oahu CaneFires in the Hawaiian Winter League, leading the league in home runs with 7.

In 1997, with the Lakeland Flying Tigers, Kapler led the Class A+ Florida State League in doubles (40) and total bases (262), tied for first in extra-base hits (65), was 2nd in games, 3rd in hits (153), tied for 3rd in home runs (19) and RBIs (87), 4th in slugging percentage (.505), and tied for 4th in runs (87) and sacrifice flies (10), while batting .295. He was named a Florida State League mid-season and post-season All-Star. He then played for the Honolulu Sharks in the Hawaiian Winter League.

In 1998, with the Jacksonville Suns, Kapler won the Class AA Southern League Most Valuable Player Award. He hit a league-high 28 home runs, and also led the league in hits (176; 8th-most in the minors), runs (113; 6th-most in the minors), doubles (47; 3rd-most in the minor leagues; breaking the old doubles record of 44), RBIs (146; most in the minors in 1998, and most ever in the Southern League), extra-base hits (81; a league record), total bases (319; a league record), and sacrifice flies (11). He was 3rd in the league in slugging percentage (.583), 4th in OPS (.976), 5th in batting average (.322), and tied for 8th in triples (6). His league record for RBIs broke the 1986 record of 132 set by Terry Steinbach. He played in both the Double-A and Southern League All-Star Games, and was recognized as the MVP of the Southern League All-Star Game. He was also named to the Southern League's post-season All-Star team, and named a Baseball America First Team Minor League All Star. He was honored as Minor League Player of the Year by Baseball Weekly, The Sporting News, and USA Today, and was named Tigers Minor League Player of the Year and Detroit's No. 1 prospect by Baseball America.

=== Detroit Tigers (1998–1999) ===
Kapler made his Major League debut in 1998 at the age of 22. He became the first Tiger since the inception of the draft in 1969 to be selected as late as the 57th round, and reach the majors.

In 1999, he hit his first career home run on April 30 against Albie Lopez of the Tampa Bay Devil Rays. Kapler's 10 home runs in his first 64 games was the fastest by a Tiger rookie since 1954, and was not surpassed until 2008. For the season, Kapler wound up hitting a career-high 18 home runs in just over 400 at bats, third among AL rookies, and his 49 RBIs were ninth among AL rookies.

=== Texas Rangers (2000–2002) ===
In November 1999, he was traded by the Tigers with Al Webb, Frank Catalanotto, Francisco Cordero, Bill Haselman, and Justin Thompson to the Texas Rangers for Juan González, Danny Patterson, and Gregg Zaun.

Kapler hit two home runs on Opening Day in the 2000 season for the Rangers, becoming the first player to homer in his first two at bats as a Ranger. In July he homered in four straight games, tying a club record. He then had a team-record 28-game hitting streak later that season, which was also a major league high for the season. On July 30, he was named the American League's Player of the Week. In 2000, he batted .302/.360/.473 with 32 doubles (second on the team), 14 home runs, and 66 RBIs in 444 at bats, hitting .344 in the second half of the season. On defense, playing primarily center field, he tied for second among AL outfielders with 4 double plays.

In 2001, he hit 17 home runs, scored 77 runs, had 72 RBIs, and stole 23 bases (leading the team) in 29 attempts. Kapler batted .267/.348/.437. He made just one error in 344 total chances for a .997 fielding percentage, second-best in the AL, and his eight assists tied for fourth-most of any AL center fielder.

=== Colorado Rockies (2002–2003) ===
In July 2002, the Rangers traded Kapler, with Jason Romano and cash, to the Colorado Rockies for Dennys Reyes and Todd Hollandsworth. Playing for the Rockies in 2002, he batted .311/.359/.445 in 119 at bats. In 2002 between Texas and Colorado, he batted .279, and .357 with runners in scoring position, as on defense he had 10 outfield assists.

=== Boston Red Sox (2003–2004) ===
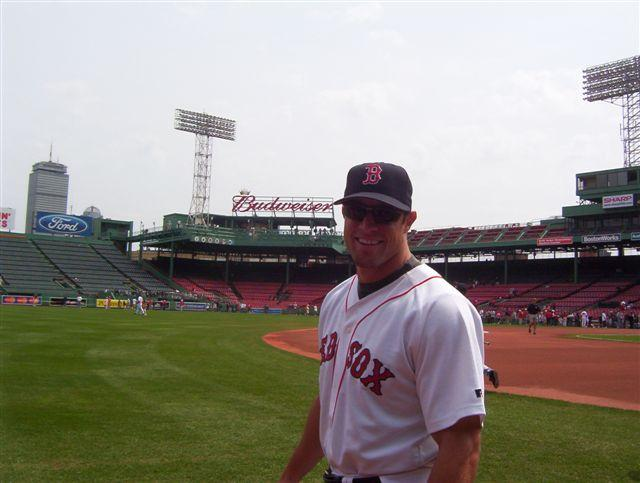
Kapler with the Boston Red Sox in 2004.

On June 28, 2003, the Boston Red Sox acquired Kapler from the Rockies. He batted .292/.349/.449 for the Red Sox, in 158 at bats.

In 2004, when Shawn Green of the Dodgers announced that he would not play on Yom Kippur, the Boston media asked Kapler if he would do the same thing. Kapler called a Boston-area rabbi for advice. With the Curse of the Bambino still hanging over Red Sox fans' heads, the rabbi reportedly said: "Do it! We need all the help we can get!" Kapler decided to play.

Kapler played a career-high 136 games in 2004, hitting 6 home runs and driving in 33 runs in 290 at bats, as he primarily played right field. He batted .272. He also led the team with 6 outfield assists. On Patriots' Day 2004, Kapler drove in two runs, including the game-winner in the bottom of the eighth inning off former Red Sox closer and Yankees setup man Tom Gordon. The Red Sox went on to win the game 5–4.

In Game 4 of the 2004 World Series against the Cardinals, Kapler had been inserted as a pinch runner, but manager Terry Francona left him in the game to play right field in the ninth. Kapler joined an exclusive club, as one of the nine players who were on the field when the Red Sox won their first title in 86 years.

=== Yomiuri Giants (2005) ===
Less than one month after the Red Sox dramatic 2004 World Series victory, Kapler departed to play for Japan's Yomiuri Giants. He received a $2 million deal plus a $700,000 signing bonus, compared to the $750,000 salary he had received from the Red Sox. Driven by the memory of an elementary-school report that he had written about Japan, he felt it was time for a change. "I tend to make emotional decisions," he said. "I did it more for the life experience than anything else. And ever since I wrote that report, I've been fascinated by everything that an 8-year-old associates with a country far, far away." He struggled in 38 games in Japan, and was placed on the inactive list by Yomiuri in the 2005 mid-season.

=== Boston Red Sox (2005–2006) ===
Kapler was re-signed by the Red Sox in July 2005, just a few hours after clearing Japanese Central League waivers. On September 14, 2005, Kapler ruptured his left Achilles tendon while rounding second base after a home run by teammate Tony Graffanino. Kapler was replaced by pinch runner Alejandro Machado, who finished rounding the bases and scored the run in Kapler's place. Kapler had surgery, which ended his season.

In June 2006, Kapler came back from his injury. That season, he had his best on-base percentage in five years (.340), hit .316 with two out and runners in scoring position, and played error-less outfield for the second year in a row.

Kapler announced his retirement from professional baseball on December 12, 2006.

=== Minor league managerial career (2007) ===
He served the Boston Red Sox as manager of their Single-A affiliate, the Greenville Drive, for one season in 2007. The team went 58–81, and finished in 7th place in the South Atlantic League Southern Division.

=== Milwaukee Brewers (2008) ===
On September 20, 2007, after one season as a manager, Kapler announced that he would like to return to play Major League Baseball in 2008. On the decision, Kapler said "I miss the battle. I still need to be on the field as a player." On December 20, Kapler signed a one-year, non-guaranteed contract with the Milwaukee Brewers that paid $800,000 when Kapler made the roster.

"He knows he has to come in and win a job. I don't think this was about the money for him. It was about getting a chance to play again. He has great work ethic. People love the way he plays the game. He's a guy with Major League experience and can play all three outfield positions. And this guy is in better shape than our 25-year-old guys."

— Brewers General Manager Doug Melvin

The initial plan, before Mike Cameron was acquired, was to have Kapler replace the non-tendered Kevin Mench as a right-handed option to share time with Tony Gwynn Jr., Gabe Gross, and Joe Dillon, in left field. With a focus on defense, Yost indicated in March that Gwynn and Kapler might have a leg up on Gross.

"He's been very impressive so far," said Brewers manager Ned Yost in March. "I would have never known he took a year off. He does not show any signs of it to me.

While Cameron served a 25-game suspension to start the season for twice testing positive for a banned stimulant in the fall of 2007, Kapler made the club, and began to see action in center field. On April 5, 2008, he hit the first pinch-hit home run of his career for Milwaukee in the 7th inning of a game against the San Francisco Giants. Kapler started the season as the Brewers' hottest hitter, going 11-for-26 with four home runs and 11 RBIs.

Kapler gave fans a taste of his hard-nosed style against the Dodgers on August 16. He ran full-speed after Russell Martin's long fly in the seventh inning, snagging the ball to deprive Martin of a home run as he toppled head-first into the left-field seats. The outstanding catch helped the Brewers hold onto a one-run lead, and earned Kapler the Play of the Year Award, voted by over 12 million fans in MLB's This Year in Baseball Awards. Similarly, three days later Kapler made a diving catch in left field to rob Ty Wigginton of a hit, and on September 6 Kapler ran down a blooper to center and made an outstanding diving catch. Kapler missed the last two weeks of the season as well as the NLDS after tearing his latissimus dorsi muscle in his right shoulder on a throw to the plate in mid-September.

For the year, in 96 games Kapler batted .301/.340/.498, and hit eight home runs, playing mostly in center field, and batting .386 with a .632 slugging percentage in tie games. Kapler started 43 games. He was the club's best pinch-hitter, batting .323 with two homers (the first pinch-hit shots of his career) and 8 RBIs.

On October 30, 2008, Kapler filed for free agency.

=== Tampa Bay Rays (2009–2010) ===
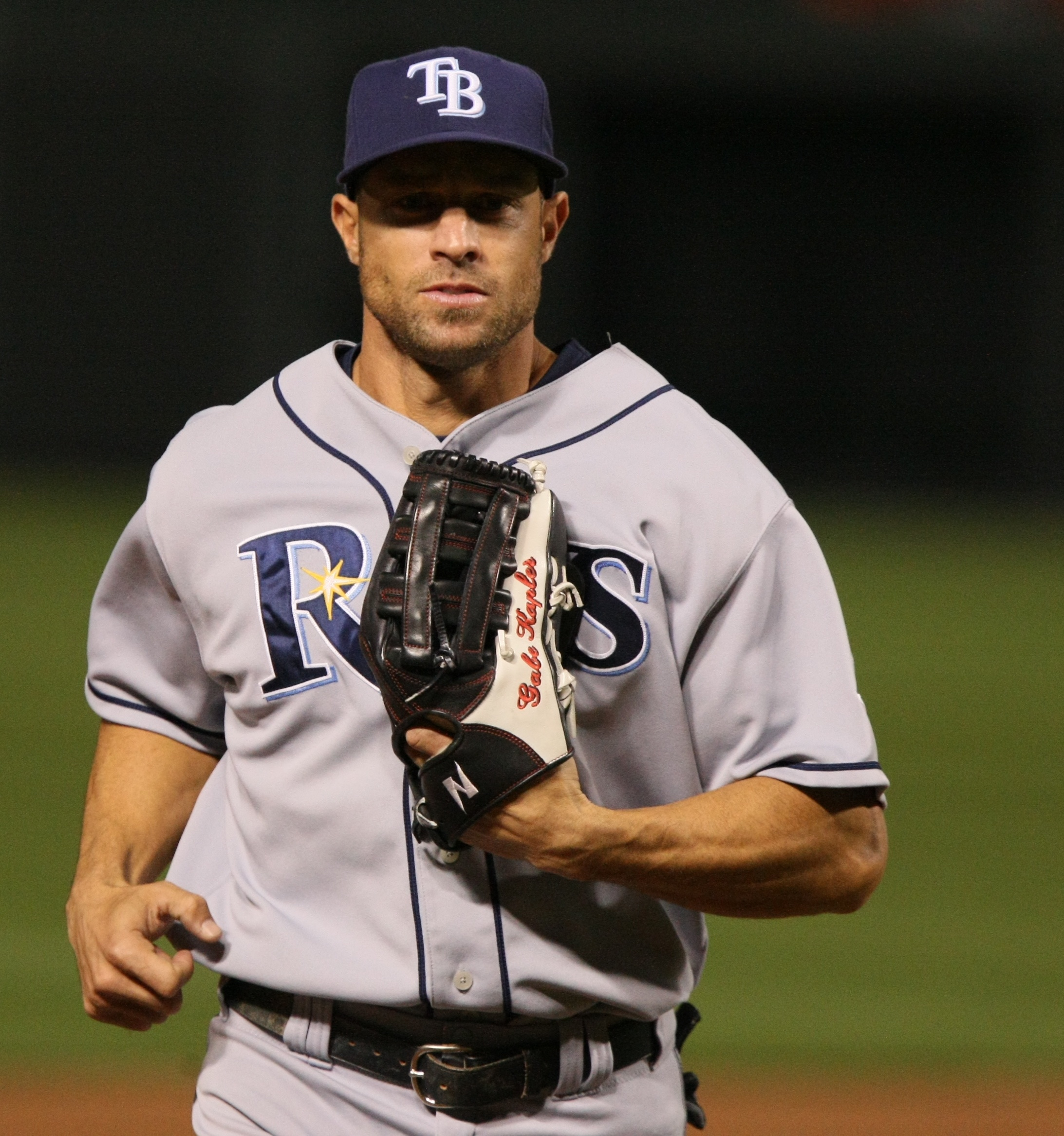
Kapler with the Tampa Bay Rays in 2009

On January 12, 2009, Kapler signed a one-year contract with the Tampa Bay Rays for $1,000,018. The extra $18 was chosen because it represented the symbol for "life" in Judaism.

Kapler started the season platooning in center field with Matt Joyce, in place of Rays' center fielder B. J. Upton, who had offseason surgery on his left shoulder and was not ready for Opening Day. On April 13, Kapler struck out against New York Yankee outfielder Nick Swisher. Kapler then began to platoon in right field with Gabe Gross. In June, he tied a club record shared by Jose Canseco and Julio Lugo, with home runs in four straight games. Kapler ended the season at .354 with 4 homers in 82 at-bats against left-handers. In this role, he almost broke up Mark Buehrle's perfect game on July 23, 2009. Leading off the ninth inning against the White Sox, he was robbed of a home run by a leaping DeWayne Wise, a ninth inning defensive replacement.

Through July 10, despite a slow start, Kapler had the best slugging percentage of his career (.505) and was batting .320 with 4 home runs in 75 at-bats and a .680 slugging percentage against left-handers. As of July 10, 64% of his hits in 2009 had been for extra bases, which would be first in the major leagues for a player with at least 100 plate appearances (Kapler had 129).

Kapler was re-signed by the Rays on October 27, 2009, to another one-year contract, this time for $1.05 million. Over 2008–09, Kapler hit .304 against left-handers with a .577 slugging percentage, 9th-best in the Major Leagues. "Over the past two years, Kap has been one of the best in baseball against left-handed pitching", said Rays executive vice president of baseball operations Andrew Friedman. "Because he's also a plus defensive outfielder, he's become a tremendous asset here. His value even extends beyond the field; his knowledge and presence make him a positive influence on our younger players."

In a December interview manager Joe Maddon said: "I'm still a big Gabe Kapler fan. You look at his OPS over the last couple of years versus left-handed pitching, it's among the best in all of baseball".

Heading into spring training in 2010, Kapler was likely to platoon in right field with Joyce. However, he appeared in only 59 games that season, hitting a career-worst .210 with only two home runs as he battled right hip flexor and right ankle injuries, and became a free agent after the season.

=== Los Angeles Dodgers ===
On January 18, 2011, Kapler signed a minor league contract with the Los Angeles Dodgers. He also received an invitation to spring training. Kapler was released on March 31, in the team's last cut of spring training.

== Post-playing career ==
=== Team Israel ===
Kapler coached for the Israeli national baseball team in the 2013 World Baseball Classic qualifier in September 2012. Israel lost to Spain in extra innings in the Pool Finals, and did not qualify to play in the World Baseball Classic.

=== Egraphs ===
From 2012 to 2013, Kapler worked closely with technology startup Egraphs, which focused on electronic personalized autographs, and which was licensed with MLB and the NBA. In spring 2013, Egraphs closed operations.

=== Television work ===
In the summer of 2013, Kapler became an analyst for Fox Sports 1 cable network. He appeared frequently on the network's Fox Sports Live program from the network's debut on August 17, 2013, as well as MLB Whiparound from the program's inception in March 2014. Two of his segments were "Saberclips", in which he explained advanced statistics and sabermetrics used in baseball, and also "In the Cage", in which he shared advice with young baseball players as to how to train when they hit the batting cage. He also worked as a writer and analyst at Baseball Prospectus, which is devoted to the sabermetric baseball analysis.

=== Los Angeles Dodgers ===
On November 7, 2014, Kapler became the Dodgers' director of player development. In that position, Kapler had all the affiliates in the Dodgers farm system, as well as the major league team, switch to serving entirely organic food, and take junk food out of the clubhouse. Kapler, known as a proponent of advanced statistics and healthy food, explained his flexible general approach, saying:

One thing we want to do is avoid locking ourselves into any organizational philosophy that can't be easily altered or improved. While mining for best practices, we have overarching themes and philosophies, but we don't want to say, 'This is what we believe' and get so dug in that we're not capable of being nimble as new studies present better ways to approach problems and development. That flexibility is a thought process that we have to constantly talk about it with players and staff.

In 2015, a 17-year-old accused a Dodger minor league player initially of videotaping a fight in which two women whom she had met through Facebook hit her while with her in a hotel room of a player. The accuser emailed her complaint to Kapler. He sought direction from Dodgers' lawyers and human resources personnel and then replied quickly with a phone call, apologized, and offered to help in any way she needed. A week later—when the accuser was arrested for shoplifting—she added the second accusation to police, though she did not communicate it to Dodgers personnel, that at the time a Dodger minor league player engaged in alleged sexual assault by briefly putting his hand under her bra and down her pants; the accuser then declined to cooperate with the police, and no charges were filed. Kapler reported the accusation of the videotaping of the assault to Dodgers personnel, who did not report it to Major League Baseball. Kapler has apologized for his handling of the allegations.

Kapler was one of the favorites and a finalist to become the new Dodgers manager following the departure of Don Mattingly, but lost out to Dave Roberts prior to the 2016 season.

== Managerial career ==
=== Philadelphia Phillies (2018–2019) ===
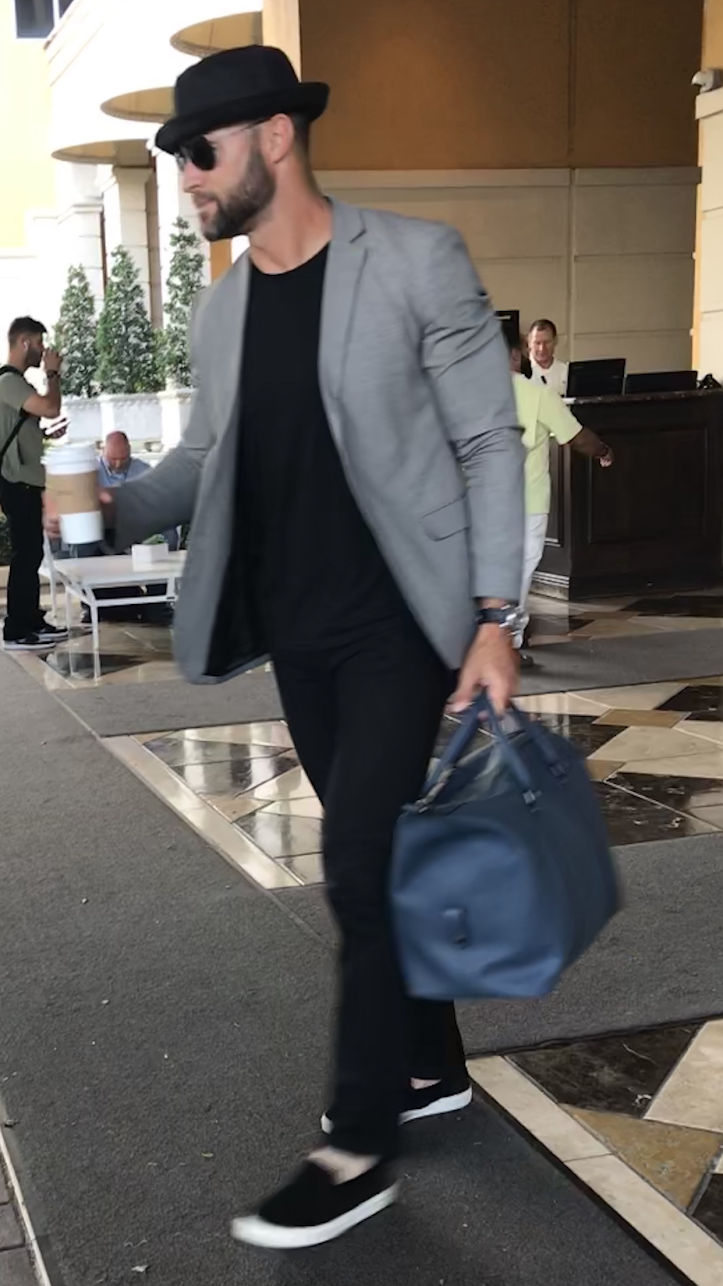
Kapler in 2019

On October 30, 2017, the Philadelphia Phillies announced that they had hired the 42-year-old Kapler as their new manager, the 54th in team history. Phillies General Manager Matt Klentak and principal owner John Middleton said that what most impressed them during Kapler's interview, which included people across several team departments, were his level of preparation and his people skills, evidenced by his ability to connect with each one of the groups.

Kapler inherited a team that had lost 96 games their prior season, the team's sixth season in a row with a losing record. He had his theme for the season inscribed on t-shirts that were given out to each of his players: "Be Bold." After 100 games, he had the second-most wins among Phillies managers historically (56), and he went 24-38 in the last 62 games, to finish the 2018 season 80-82. The 27 overturns caused by his challenges were tied for the second-most in the majors, and the 4.7 pitchers per game he used were second-most in the major leagues. The Phillies were in first place as late as August 12, but only won 21 games in the last two months of the season.

In 2019 he managed the team to an 81–81 (.500) record, Philadelphia's best record since 2012 when they also had a .500 record. The 23 overturns caused by his challenges were tied for the second-most in the majors. As in 2018, the Phillies spent most of the season in playoff contention, only to slump in August and September. Following the season, Kapler was fired. Joe Girardi succeeded him and managed the team to a 28–32 (.467) record the following season.

=== San Francisco Giants (2020–2023) ===
==== 2020 ====
In November 2019, the San Francisco Giants hired Kapler as their 39th manager, succeeding the retiring Bruce Bochy. He inherited a team that had a win–loss record of 77–85 (.475) in 2019.

In 2020, after Kapler hired three hitting coaches who were young enough to still be players, the Giants veteran hitters raved about how well prepared they were going into games with the new approach. Kapler platooned whenever he thought he could get an advantage, and the resulting turnaround with the Giants hitters was significant. While the team had ranked 28th, 29th, and 29th in runs the prior three seasons, under Kapler they finished 8th in runs, averaging 4.98 runs per game, up from 4.19 the prior year and 3.72 in 2018. Kapler used 1.25 pinch hitters per game, more than any other manager in major league baseball, and the third-most pitchers per game (4.9). Both new and veteran players responded positively to Kapler, and a number of them highlighted his steadiness as a factor in turning around slumping years. In the pandemic-shortened 2020 season, he managed the team to a 29–31 (.483) record that far exceeded expectations in what was expected to be a rebuilding year, and surpassed the record of Kapler's former team, the Phillies. The Giants fell just short of making the playoffs, which they would have made had they won their last game of the season, a game they lost by one run. They ended up with the same win–loss record as the Milwaukee Brewers, but it was the Brewers that advanced to the playoffs as they had a better in-division record. Kapler received three third-place votes for NL Manager of the Year.

==== 2021: NL Manager of the Year ====
Kapler began the 2021 season with a coaching staff of 13 that included nine who had never been on a major league staff before he hired them, and most of them were young enough to be playing themselves. Kapler won his 200th game as a manager in April 2021, becoming the first manager in MLB history with a 200–200 win–loss record over the first 400 games of his career.

In the 2021 regular season, his Giants won more games than any other major league team (107; with his team's winning percentage rising from .483 to .660), the 12 overturns caused by his challenges were tied with those of LA's Dave Roberts for the most in the majors, and he was one of only two managers who were not ejected during the season (along with Tampa Bay's Kevin Cash). He used more pinch hitters per game than any other major league manager for the second season in a row (2.60), and the second-most pitchers per game (4.7). Kapler ended the 2021 season with a Giants managerial win-loss percentage of .613, third all-time of the Giants' 39 managers, behind only Hall of Famers Hughie Jennings and Rogers Hornsby, each of whom managed for less than a year nearly a century earlier.

Kapler's players praised him for keeping open lines of communication with them throughout the season, which was especially important given that he used the team's entire roster, shattering the MLB record for pinch-hit appearances as he exploited matchups aggressively.

Kapler was named the 2021 National League Manager of the Year by the Baseball Writers' Association of America, with 28 of a possible 30 first place votes. He became the second Giants manager to win the award, joining Dusty Baker, after managing the team to a franchise-record 107 wins and into the postseason for the first time in five years, despite pre-season projections that questioned the Giants' ability even to finish above .500 (Baseball Prospectus projected the team to win 75 games, entering the season).

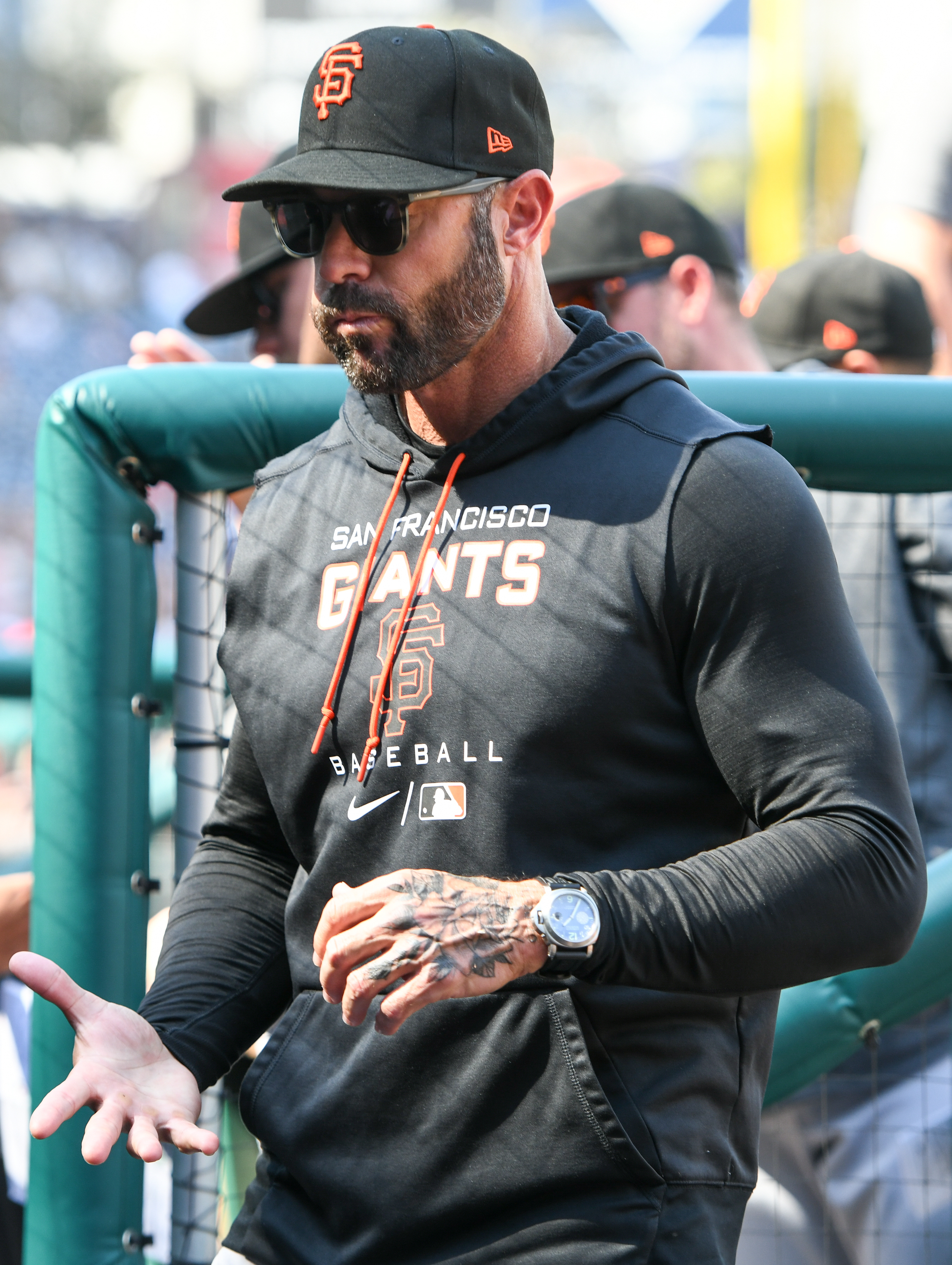
Kapler with the Giants in 2022.

Kapler was also named the Sporting News 2021 NL Manager of the Year, as 86% of his fellow National League managers voted for him.

On November 12, the Giants rewarded Kapler with a two-year contract extension through the 2024 season.

==== 2022 ====
In the aftermath of the Robb Elementary School Shooting and other mass shootings in the US, on May 27, 2022, Kapler announced he was not happy with the direction of the country. In protest, he said that he will not come out of the dugout for the national anthem until he deems the country to be back on a better track.

In 2022, Kapler used more pinch hitters per game, 1.63, than any other major league manager for the third season in a row.

==== 2023 ====
The Giants were eliminated with six games to play in the 2023 season, making it the third time in Kapler's tenure that they did not reach the postseason. This happened on the heels of a slide that saw them go 2–8 on a home stand and win just three times in their last 17 road games. Responding to pitcher Logan Webb's demand for making "big changes," Kapler stated, "We all have responsibility to raise the bar to the highest possible expectations, to not accept losing and expect to win every night and to go quickly back to make adjustments and we haven't met that standard." The Giants fired Kapler three days later, with Kai Correa taking over as the interim manager for the remainder of the season.

=== Managerial record ===
As of games played on September 27, 2023

Team	Year	Regular season					Postseason			
Team	Year	Games	Won	Lost	Win %	Finish	Won	Lost	Win %	Result
PHI	2018	162	80	82	.494	3rd in NL East	–	–	–	
PHI	2019	162	81	81	.500	4th in NL East	–	–	–	
PHI Total		324	161	163	.497		0	0	.000	
SF	2020	60	29	31	.483	3rd in NL West	–	–	–	
SF	2021	162	107	55	.660	1st in NL West	2	3	.400	Lost NLDS (LAD)
SF	2022	162	81	81	.500	3rd in NL West	–	–	–	
SF	2023	159	78	81	.491	4th in NL West	–	–	–	
SF Total		543	295	248	.543		2	3	.400	
Total		870	456	411	.526		2	3	.400	

== Front office career ==
=== Miami Marlins (2023–present) ===
In December 2023, Kapler became an assistant general manager of the Miami Marlins of MLB. He worked under the Marlins' new president of baseball operations Peter Bendix, formerly a member of the Tampa Bay Rays front office during Kapler's time with the team as a player in 2009–10. Kapler's primary focus was on player development within the Marlins' system, and he was involved in all areas of baseball operations. On November 3, 2025, the Marlins promoted Kapler to general manager.

== Accolades ==
In 2006 he was inducted into the Southern California Jewish Sports Hall of Fame.

== Personal life ==
Kapler lived in Tarzana, California, with his wife, Lisa (Jansen), whom he married in January 1999. They had two sons, and eventually the Kapler family moved to Northern Liberties, Philadelphia, after he became the manager of the Phillies and then to North Beach, San Francisco, after he became the manager of the Giants. He and his wife, whom he met in his senior year of high school, are now divorced.

Longtime Boston Globe columnist Bob Ryan—who said of Kapler "He's as smart as any player I've ever met"—nicknamed him "The Body". He is an avid weightlifter; his body fat count was reported in 2000 to be at 3.98%, and in 2012 to be at 3.5%. He was on the cover of several fitness magazines and became renowned for being the focus of an entire K-Swiss shoe campaign before he had even reached the pros. His blog discusses fitness, nutrition, health, and leadership.

Kapler and his wife co-founded the Gabe Kapler Foundation, which is dedicated to educating the public about domestic violence, and helping women escape abusive relationships.

In an undated clubhouse poll of the Red Sox, of the 25 players on the team, 24 were Republicans and Kapler the one Democrat.

Kapler's father died in December 2020 from Parkinson's disease and Lewy body dementia. Prior to the start of the 2022 season, Kapler received a prominent tattoo on his left hand to memorialize his father.

== Jewish heritage ==
Kapler is Jewish, and to honor his heritage, has a Star of David tattooed on his left calf, with the inscription "Strong Willed, Strong Minded" in Hebrew, and the post-Holocaust motto "Never Again" with a flame and the dates of the Holocaust on his right calf. He describes his background as "culturally Jewish.... I was—and am—proud of my heritage, but don't practice religion," and as to being a Jewish Major Leaguer said: "That's something I take great pride in.... I'm very interested in my heritage and I'm very proud of who I am." He has 14 total tattoos.

Kapler has been given the nickname Hebrew Hammer due to his frequent longball hits, along with his muscularity and the fact that he is Jewish. It later became the nickname of Ryan Braun, who is also Jewish, and was Kapler's teammate on the Brewers. On August 8, 2005, while playing for the Red Sox, Kapler took the field in the 9th inning along with Kevin Youkilis and Adam Stern, setting a "record" for the most Jewish players on the field at one time in American League history and the most in Major League Baseball history since four Jews took the field for the New York Giants in a game in 1941.

In 2008, with his career 69th home run he passed Art Shamsky and Lou Boudreau for 9th on the all-time list for home runs by Jewish major leaguers. Kapler was the unanimous winner of the 2008 Jewish Comeback Player of the Year award. Through 2018, he was 5th all-time in career stolen bases (behind Brad Ausmus) and 9th all-time in career doubles (behind Sid Gordon) among Jewish major league baseball players.

In 2018, Kapler became the eighth Jewish manager in MLB history. He joined Bob Melvin, Brad Ausmus, Jeff Newman, Norm Sherry, Andy Cohen, and Lipman Pike.

== See also ==
- List of athletes who came out of retirement
- List of Jewish Major League Baseball players

Awards
Preceded by Pedro Martinez/ Manny Ramirez	AL Player of the Week; July 30, 2000	Succeeded by Tim Salmon
