= Kai Correa =

American baseball coach (born 1988)

New York Mets – No. 50
- Coach
- Born: July 14, 1988 (age 38); Hilo, Hawaii, U.S.
- Bats: Right Throws: Right

MLB statistics
- Managerial record: 1–2
- Winning %: .333
- Managerial record at Baseball Reference

Teams
- As manager: San Francisco Giants (2023) (Note: Correa served as interim manager for the final three games of the season following the dismissal of manager Gabe Kapler.); As coach: San Francisco Giants (2020–2023); Cleveland Guardians (2024–2025); New York Mets (2026–present)

Kainoa Thomas Correa (born July 14, 1988) is an American professional baseball coach who currently serves as the bench coach for the New York Mets of Major League Baseball (MLB). He has previously served as the bench coach and interim manager for the San Francisco Giants. He played college baseball at the University of Puget Sound. He served as the interim manager for the Giants' final three games of the 2023 season, after the dismissal of manager Gabe Kapler.

== Early life ==
Correa is of Native Hawaiian, Portuguese, and Japanese descent. Correa attended Waiakea High School in Hilo, Hawaii. He attended the University of Puget Sound, where he played college baseball as an infielder for four years (2007–2010). He graduated with a degree in U.S. History.

== Coaching career ==
=== Cleveland Indians ===
Correa joined the Puget Sound coaching staff after graduating, and spent the 2010–2011 through 2013–2014 seasons there. During his time there, his roles included head assistant coach, recruiting coordinator, infield coach, third-base coach, academic advisor, and overseeing the team's strength and conditioning program. Correa then moved on to the University of Northern Colorado, where he spent four seasons. His first was as a volunteer assistant, and final three as a full-time assistant coach. He served as the overall defensive coordinator, infield coach, third base coach, and as the recruiting coordinator. He drew a following for posting baseball videos on social media.

Correa joined the Cleveland Indians organization in 2018, and served as the AZL Indians infield coach that season. He spent the 2019 season as the Indians short-season defensive coordinator.

=== San Francisco Giants ===
Prior to the 2020 season, Correa joined the San Francisco Giants coaching staff as their bench coach and infield instructor.

On September 29, 2023, the Giants fired manager Gabe Kapler and named Correa interim manager for the final three games of the 2023 season.

=== Cleveland Guardians (second stint) ===
On November 27, 2023, the Cleveland Guardians hired Correa to be their major league field coordinator.

On November 13, 2024, the Cleveland Guardians promoted Correa to be their director of defense, baserunning and game strategy in addition to major league field coordinator.

=== New York Mets ===
On October 15, 2025, the New York Mets officially announced that they had hired Correa to serve as their new bench coach after firing six coaches including previous bench coach John Gibbons.

== Managerial record ==
As of games played on October 1, 2023

Team	Year	Regular season					Postseason			
Team	Year	Games	Won	Lost	Win %	Finish	Won	Lost	Win %	Result
SF	2023	3	1	2	.333	4th in NL West	–	–	–	–
Total		3	1	2	.333		0	0	–	
