= David Villar =

American baseball player (born 1997)

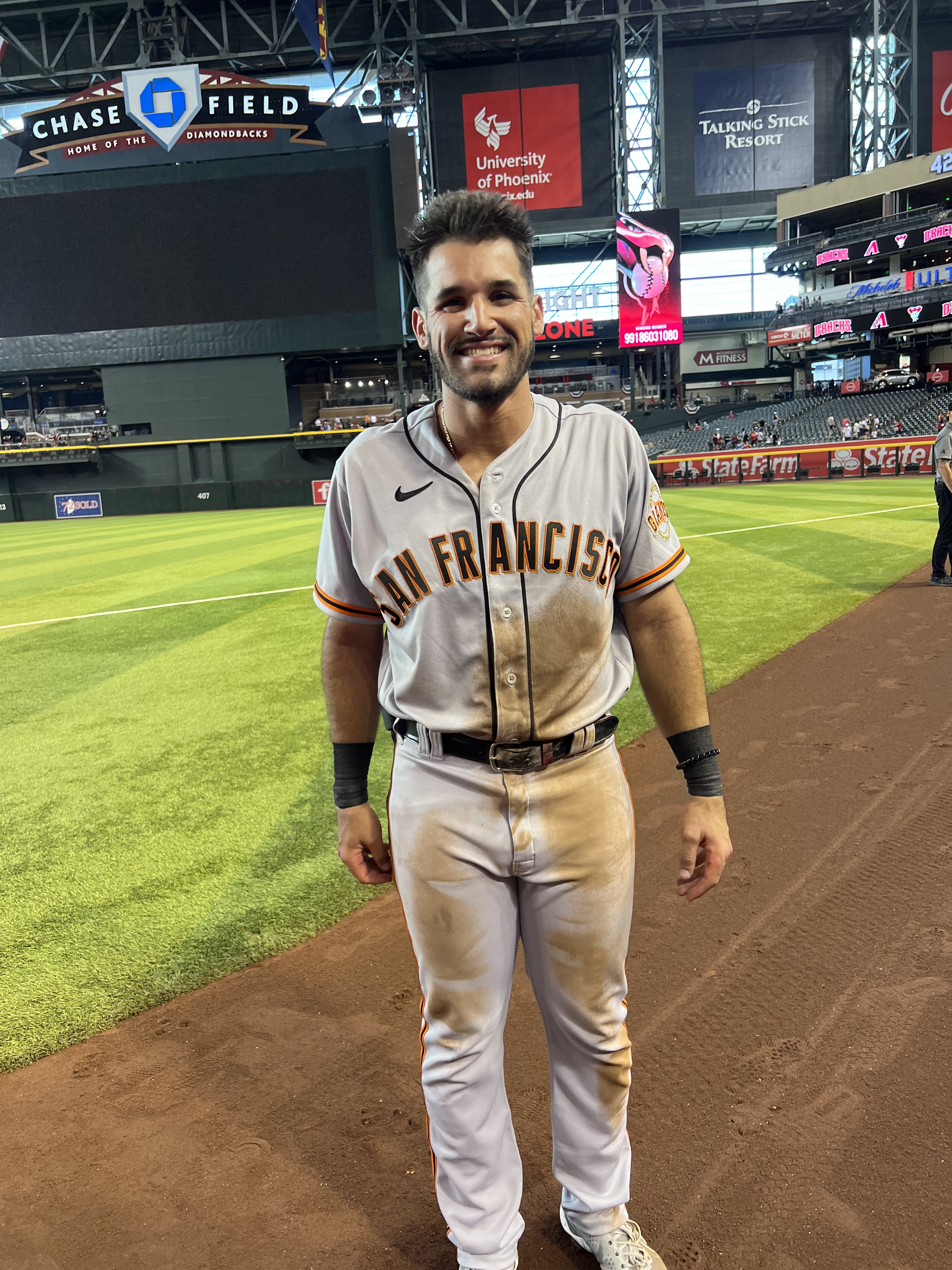
- Villar with the Giants in 2022

Caliente de Durango – No. 32
- Third baseman
- Born: January 27, 1997 (age 29); Atlanta, Georgia, U.S.
- Bats: Right Throws: Right

MLB debut
- July 4, 2022, for the San Francisco Giants

MLB statistics (through 2025 season)
- Batting average: .202
- Home runs: 15
- Runs batted in: 41
- Stats at Baseball Reference

Teams
- San Francisco Giants (2022–2025)

David Alexander Villar (born January 27, 1997) is an American professional baseball third baseman for the Caliente de Durango of the Mexican League. He has previously played in Major League Baseball (MLB) for the San Francisco Giants. He played college baseball at the University of South Florida. Villar was drafted by the Giants in the 11th round of the 2018 MLB draft and made his MLB debut with them in 2022. He was awarded the 2022 Pacific Coast League Most Valuable Player Award.

== Early life ==
Villar was born in Atlanta, Georgia and grew up in Pembroke Pines, Florida. His parents are Lazaro and Mirta, and he has a sister, Natalie.

== High school ==
Villar attended American Heritage High School in Plantation, Florida. He played for the high school baseball team, starting in eighth grade. As a sophomore, he batted .346. As a junior, he batted .444 and was named First Team All-County by the Sun Sentinel and Miami Herald. As a senior and team captain, he was a Preseason Under Armour All-American, batted .324, and was again named First Team All-County by the Sun Sentinel and Miami Herald.

== College ==
Villar played college baseball at the University of South Florida. In his sophomore year in 2017, he batted .290/.417(10th in the American Athletic Conference)/.449 with 7 home runs, 45 RBIs (9th), 41 walks (2nd), and 62 strikeouts (6th) in 214 at-bats, playing third base. In the summer of 2017, he played for the La Crosse Loggers in the collegiate summer wood bat Northwoods League, batting .312/.399/.546(10th in the league) with 13 home runs (2nd), 49 RBIs (9th), 14 hit by pitch (3rd), 5 sacrifice flies, and three intentional walks (leading the league), and 56 strikeouts (5th) in 231 at bats. He played 51 games at third base and five games at first base.

Playing in 2018 as a junior for South Florida, Villar led the league with 24 doubles (9th-most in the country, and a Conference record) and 8 sacrifice flies. He also batted .374(2nd in the Conference)/.463(2nd)/.648(2nd) with 53 runs (4th), 12 home runs (7th), 58 RBIs (2nd), and 15 hit by pitch (2nd) in 219 at bats, playing third base. He was named an All-American by Collegiate Baseball Newspaper and College Sports Madness, and a 2018 All-American Athletic Conference First Team.

== Professional career ==
=== San Francisco Giants ===
==== 2018-21: Minor leagues ====
Villar was drafted by the San Francisco Giants in the 11th round, with the 316th overall selection, of the 2018 Major League Baseball draft. He signed for a signing bonus of $125,000. Villar spent that summer with the rookie-level Arizona League Giants and Low-A Salem-Keizer Volcanoes, batting a combined .282/.342/.535 in 245 at-bats, playing third base. With Salem-Keizer, he was 3rd in doubles in the Northwest League with 22, 3rd in home runs with 13, 3rd in RBI with 42, 6th in slugging percentage at .549, 8th in strikeouts (67), and 9th in runs with 36, in 226 at-bats. He was named a 2018 MiLB Organization All-Star.

Villar spent the 2019 campaign with the High-A San Jose Giants, batting .262/.334/.421 with 68 runs (9th in the California League), 9 hit by pitch (9th), 144 strikeouts (5th), and 7 sacrifice flies (4th) in 423 at-bats, playing 97 games at third base and 12 games at first base. Villar did not play in a game in 2020 due to the cancellation of the minor league season because of the COVID-19 pandemic.

Villar played for the Double-A Richmond Flying Squirrels in 2021. He batted .275/.374/.506 with 70 runs (3rd in the Northeast League), 29 doubles (4th), 20 home runs (7th; a single-season franchise record), 58 RBI, 46 walks (5th), 112 strikeouts (6th), 15 hit by pitch (leading the league) in 385 at-bats, playing 92 games at third base and 13 games at first base. Villar was also named a 2021 MiLB Organization All-Star.

==== 2022: MLB debut ====
Villar started 2022 with the Triple-A Sacramento River Cats. At the time of his July 4, 2022, call-up, Villar was leading the Pacific Coast League with 21 home runs and batting .284/.409/.633 (5th) with 53 runs (3rd), 63 RBI (2nd), 44 walks (2nd), 76 strikeouts (2nd), and 6 hit by pitch (7th) in 229 at-bats.

On July 4, 2022, the Giants selected Villar's contract and promoted him to the major leagues. His first Major League hit came that day on the first pitch in his first at-bat, a double in the second inning against Madison Bumgarner of the Arizona Diamondbacks. On July 8, Villar hit his first career home run, a solo shot off of San Diego Padres starter Blake Snell. On September 7, Villar enjoyed his first career multi-homer game against the Los Angeles Dodgers, with a two-run homer off of starter Clayton Kershaw, and a solo shot off of reliever Justin Bruihl.

In 2022 with Sacramento, Villar batted .275/.404/.617 in 298 at-bats, with 67 runs, 27 home runs (6th), 82 RBI (tied for 8th), 55 walks, 93 strikeouts, and 11 hit by pitch (8th), while playing 51 games at third base, 16 games at first base, and 15 games at second base, and five at DH. After the season, he was chosen for the Pacific Coast League Most Valuable Player Award and named third baseman on the postseason PCL All-Star team.

With the Giants in 2022, Villar batted .231/.332/.455 in 156 at-bats, with nine home runs, 24 RBI, and 58 strikeouts, while playing 27 games at third base, 11 at first base, 10 at DH, and 6 at second base.

==== 2023 ====
On April 3, 2023, in a game against the Chicago White Sox, Villar hit two home runs off of Michael Kopech, with the second homer being his first career grand slam. In 46 games for the Giants in 2023, Villar batted .145/.236/.315 with five home runs and 12 RBI.

==== 2024 ====
Villar was optioned to Triple-A Sacramento to begin the 2024 season. He played in 11 games for San Francisco during the season, slashing .257/.270/.457 with one home run and four RBI.

==== 2025 ====
Villar was designated for assignment by the Giants on March 25, 2025. He cleared waivers and was sent outright to Triple-A Sacramento on March 29. On April 19, the Giants selected Villar's contract, adding him back to their active roster. In 9 games for San Francisco, he went 4-for-20 (.200) with one RBI and four walks. Villar was designated for assignment by the Giants on May 19. He cleared waivers and elected free agency on May 22.

=== New York Mets ===
On May 27, 2025, Villar signed a minor league contract with the New York Mets. In 45 appearances for the Triple-A Syracuse Mets, he batted .196/.322/.346 with six home runs, 18 RBI, and one stolen base. Villar was released by the Mets organization on August 11.

=== Caliente de Durango ===
On March 19, 2026, Villar signed with the Caliente de Durango of the Mexican League.
