= Josiah Gray =

American baseball player (born 1997)

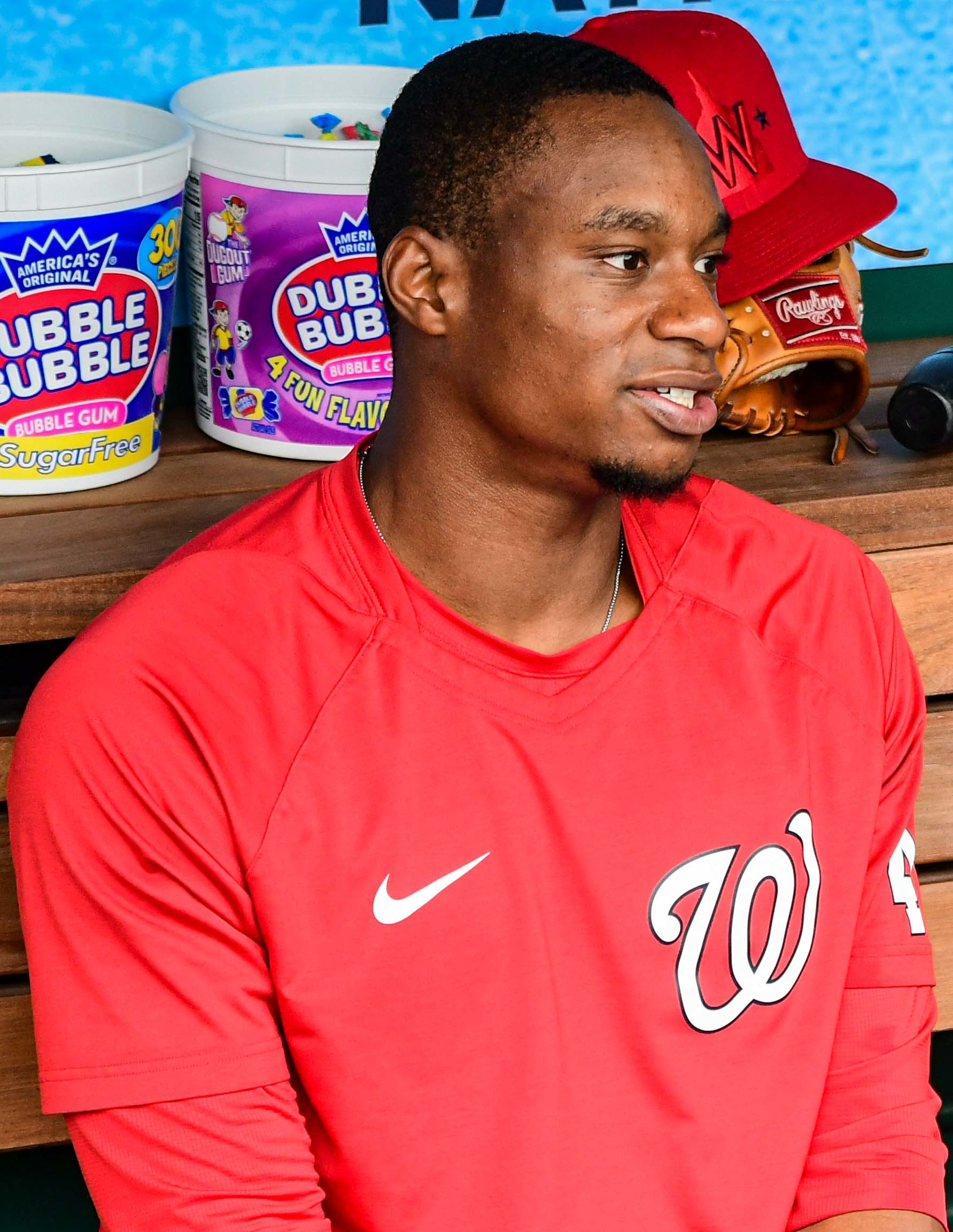
- Gray with the Washington Nationals in 2022

Free agent
- Pitcher
- Born: December 21, 1997 (age 28); New Rochelle, New York, U.S.
- Bats: Right Throws: Right

MLB debut
- July 20, 2021, for the Los Angeles Dodgers

MLB statistics (through 2026 season)
- Win–loss record: 17–27
- Earned run average: 4.79
- Strikeouts: 384
- Stats at Baseball Reference

Teams
- Los Angeles Dodgers (2021); Washington Nationals (2021–2026)

Career highlights and awards
- All-Star (2023)

Josiah Gray (born December 21, 1997) is an American professional baseball pitcher who is a free agent. He has previously played in Major League Baseball (MLB) for the Los Angeles Dodgers and Washington Nationals. He was drafted by the Cincinnati Reds in the second round of the 2018 Major League Baseball draft.

== Amateur career ==
After not being heavily recruited out of New Rochelle High School, Gray accepted his only scholarship offer to play college baseball for the Le Moyne Dolphins in Syracuse, New York. He spent his first two seasons at Le Moyne splitting time as a shortstop and a pitcher before transitioning to the mound full-time. As a freshman he had a batting average of just .265 and an earned run average (ERA) of 8.31. After becoming the full-time closer as a sophomore, he posted an ERA of 0.63. In 2017, he played collegiate summer baseball with the Chatham Anglers of the Cape Cod Baseball League. As a junior in 2018, he went 11–0 with a 1.25 ERA in 13 starts.

== Professional career ==
=== Cincinnati Reds ===
Gray was drafted by the Cincinnati Reds in the second round, 72nd overall, of the 2018 MLB draft. He signed and made his professional debut with the Greeneville Reds, going 2–2 with a 2.58 ERA in 12 starts.

=== Los Angeles Dodgers ===
On December 21, 2018, the Reds traded Gray, along with Jeter Downs and Homer Bailey, to the Los Angeles Dodgers in exchange for Matt Kemp, Yasiel Puig, Alex Wood, Kyle Farmer and cash considerations. He began 2019 with the Single-A Great Lakes Loons, and was promoted to the High-A Rancho Cucamonga Quakes in May. In July, he was promoted to the Double-A Tulsa Drillers. Between the three levels in 2019, he made 25 starts (and one relief appearance) with an 11–2 record and 2.70 ERA with 147 strikeouts in 130 innings. He was named as the Dodgers Minor League pitcher of the year.

Gray did not play in a game in 2020 due to the cancellation of the minor league season because of the COVID-19 pandemic. In 2021, Gray was assigned to the Triple-A Oklahoma City Dodgers, where he was the opening day starter. However, he was shut down after the start and missed the next two months due to a shoulder strain. He rejoined Oklahoma City and pitched in three more games. He had 22 strikeouts against only two walks in 15 2/3 innings. On July 20, 2021, Gray was added to the 40-man roster promoted to the major leagues for the first time. He made his MLB debut the same day, pitching four innings and allowing four earned runs (on three home runs) with seven strikeouts versus the San Francisco Giants. His first MLB strikeout was against Wilmer Flores. He appeared in one other game for the Dodgers, making his first MLB start on July 25 against the Colorado Rockies, striking out six in four innings while allowing two runs on three hits and four walks.

=== Washington Nationals ===
On July 30, 2021, Gray was traded to the Washington Nationals along with Keibert Ruiz, Donovan Casey, and Gerardo Carrillo in exchange for Max Scherzer and Trea Turner. Gray debuted for Washington on August 2, vs the Philadelphia Phillies. He allowed four hits and one run over five innings for no decision. On September 22, Gray recorded his first Major League win in a six inning outing against the Miami Marlins, in which he allowed six hits and two earned runs while recording eight strikeouts.

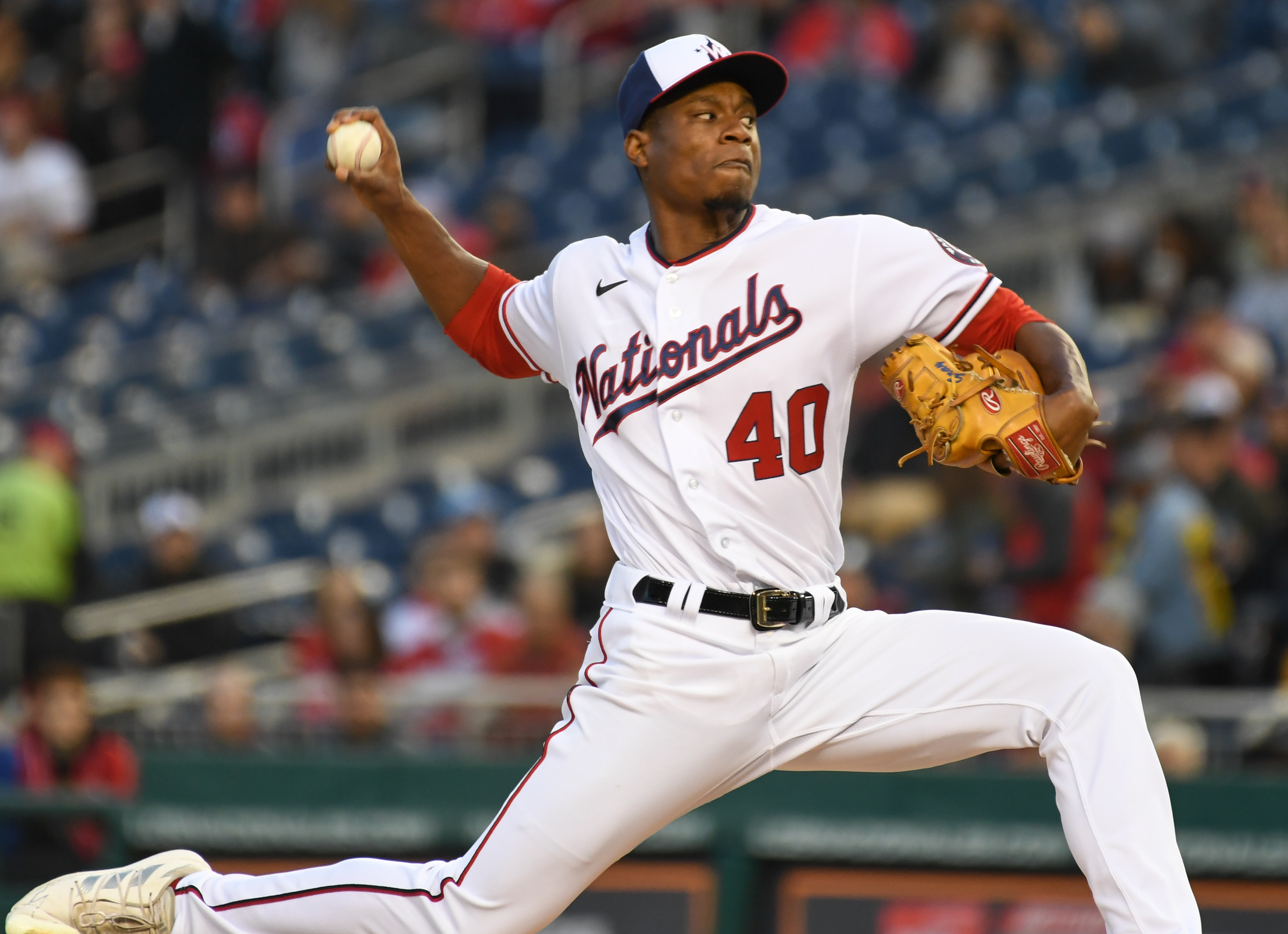
Gray pitching for the Nationals in 2022

In 2022, Gray posted a 7–10 record with a 5.02 ERA in 148 2/3 innings, and led the majors in home runs allowed, with 38, and the highest rate of home runs per 9 innings, at 2.3.

In 2023, Gray went 8–13 and posted a career-best 3.91 ERA. He was named to the 2023 MLB All-Star Game as the Nationals' only representative. At the All-Star Game, Gray pitched the bottom of the third inning for the National League, allowing no runners on base. The National League team would win the game, 3–2.

Gray made only two starts for the Nationals in 2024 before he was placed on the injured list with flexor strain on April 9, 2024. He was transferred to the 60–day injured list on July 5. On July 19, it was announced that Gray would undergo season-ending surgery to repair a partial tear in his ulnar collateral ligament. He also missed the entirety of the 2025 season due to the injury.

On March 19, 2026, Gray was optioned to Triple-A Rochester to begin the regular season. Shortly thereafter on March 23, Gray was diagnosed with a flexor strain and was immediately placed on the 60-day injured list. Gray returned to the active roster on September 17, pitching in four games out of the bullpen, including his first career save on September 25. The Nationals designated Gray for assignment on November 17, 2026. Three days later, he was non-tendered and became a free agent.

== Personal life ==
Gray's stepfather, who taught him how to pitch, coached him and raised him, died of cancer a month after he was a second-round draft pick of the Cincinnati Reds. His stepfather suffered a long illness and wasn’t able to see Gray pitch often during his last season at Le Moyne.

Gray grew up a fan of the New York Yankees.
