= Marco Luciano =

Dominican baseball player (born 2001)

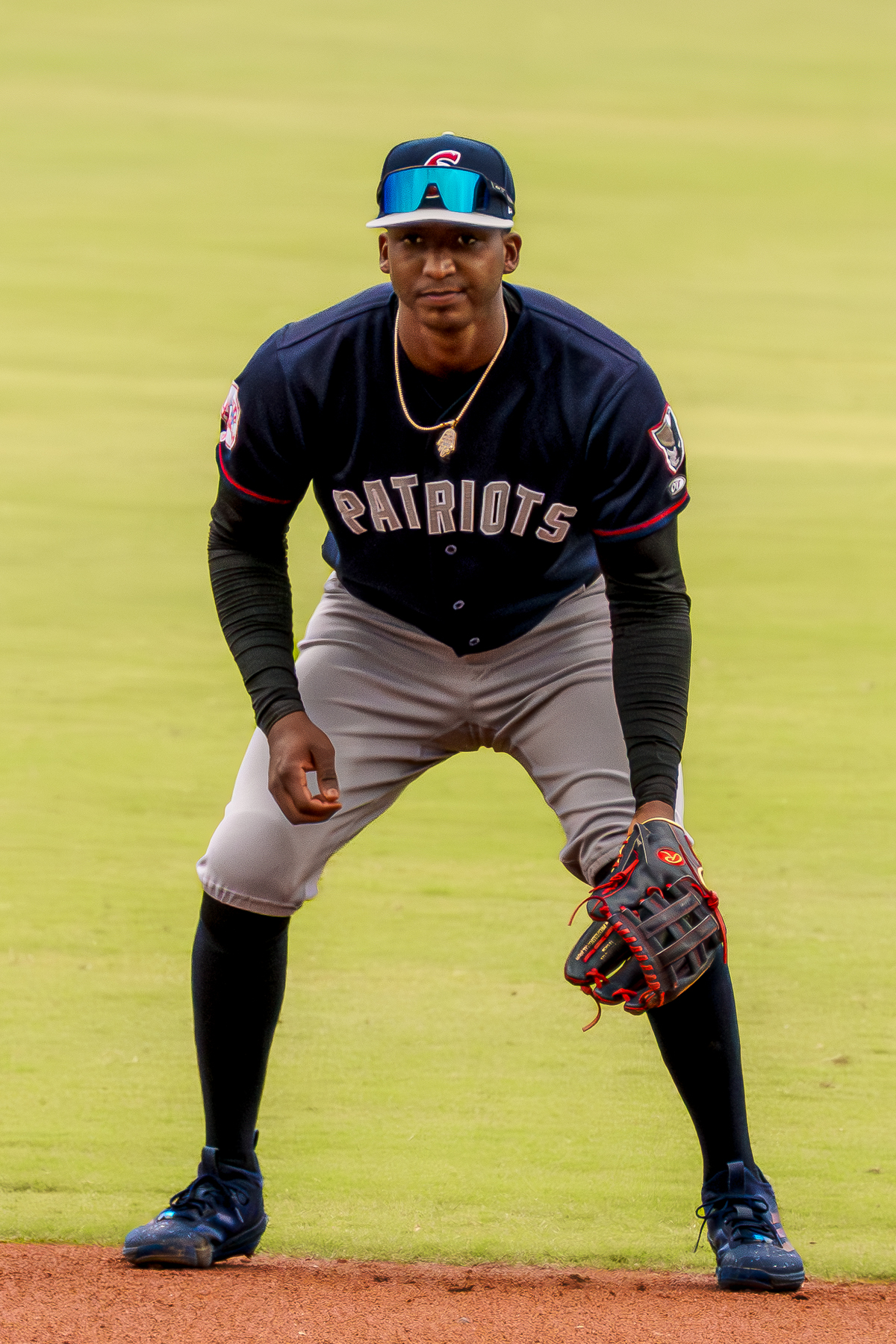
- Luciano with Somerset Patriots in 2026

New York Yankees
- Utility player
- Born: September 10, 2001 (age 25); San Francisco de Macorís, Dominican Republic
- Bats: Right Throws: Right

MLB debut
- July 26, 2023, for the San Francisco Giants

MLB statistics (through 2024 season)
- Batting average: .217
- Home runs: 0
- Runs batted in: 3
- Stats at Baseball Reference

Teams
- San Francisco Giants (2023–2024)

Marco José Luciano (born September 10, 2001) is a Dominican professional baseball utility player for the New York Yankees of Major League Baseball (MLB). He has previously played in MLB for the San Francisco Giants. He signed with the Giants as an international free agent in 2018, and made his MLB debut in 2023.

== Early life ==
Marco José Luciano was born on September 10, 2001, in San Francisco de Macorís, Dominican Republic.

== Professional career ==
=== San Francisco Giants ===
==== Minor leagues ====
Luciano was ranked as one of the top international prospects in his class. He signed with the San Francisco Giants in July 2018 as an international free agent out of the Dominican Republic for a signing bonus of $2.6 million when he was 16 years old. He underwent hernia surgery the following month.

He made his professional debut with the Arizona League Giants in 2019. Luciano led the league with 46 runs and batted .322/.438/.616 in 178 at bats, with 10 home runs (third in the league), 38 RBIs (4th), and 27 walks (7th). He ended the season as the youngest position player (age 17) in the Northwest League. He was named an ACL post-season All Star, a Baseball America Rookie All Star, and an MiLB Organization All Star.

Luciano did not play a minor league game in 2020 due to the cancellation of the minor league season caused by the COVID-19 pandemic. Luciano started 2021 with the San Jose Giants (Low-A). In June, Luciano was selected to play in the All-Star Futures Game. In August, Luciano was promoted to the Eugene Emeralds (High-A).

In 2021, Luciano hit .258/.344/.471 in 453 plate appearances with 19 home runs and 71 RBI. He was named a CAL post-season All Star, and an MiLB Organization All Star. He was selected to participate in the 2021 Arizona Fall League for the Scottsdale Scorpions, where he was the youngest player in the league.

In 2022 he played for Giants Black and Eugene. Luciano hit .269/.350/.467 in 227 at-bats, with 11 home runs and 36 RBI. He missed half the season with a lower back injury. He was ranked # 1 in the Giants 2022 MLB Prospect Rankings. On November 15, 2022, the Giants added Luciano to their 40-man roster to protect him from the Rule 5 draft.

Luciano was optioned to the Double-A Richmond Flying Squirrels to begin the 2023 season. In 56 games, he batted .228/.339/.451 with 11 home runs, 32 RBI, and 6 stolen bases. On July 18, 2023, Luciano was promoted to the Triple–A Sacramento River Cats.

==== Major leagues ====
After only six games in Sacramento, the Giants promoted Luciano to the major leagues for the first time. In 14 games during his rookie campaign, Luciano hit .231/.333/.308 with one stolen base.

Luciano was optioned to Triple–A Sacramento to begin the 2024 season after Nick Ahmed won the starting shortstop job out of spring training. In 27 appearances for the Giants, he slashed .211/.259/.303 with three RBI.

Luciano was again optioned to Triple-A Sacramento to begin the 2025 season. In 125 appearances for the River Cats, he slashed .214/.335/.413 with 23 home runs, 66 RBI, and 10 stolen bases.

=== New York Yankees ===
On December 5, 2025, Luciano was claimed off waivers by the Pittsburgh Pirates. He was designated for assignment by them on December 19. On January 7, 2026, Luciano was claimed off waivers by the Baltimore Orioles. He was designated for assignment following the acquisition of José Suárez on January 15 and claimed off waivers by the New York Yankees on January 22. Luciano was designated for assignment by the Yankees on January 27. He cleared waivers and was sent outright to the Triple-A Scranton/Wilkes-Barre RailRiders on February 3. Luciano made 116 appearances split between Scranton and the Double–A Somerset Patriots, slashing a cumulative .293/.387/.545 with 27 home runs, 78 RBI, and eight stolen bases. On November 2, the Yankees selected Luciano's contract, adding him to their 40–man roster.
