= Brett Wisely =

American baseball player (born 1999)

Atlanta Braves
- Second baseman
- Born: May 8, 1999 (age 27); Jacksonville, Florida, U.S.
- Bats: Left Throws: Right

MLB debut
- March 30, 2023, for the San Francisco Giants

MLB statistics (through 2025 season)
- Batting average: .214
- Home runs: 7
- Runs batted in: 49
- Stats at Baseball Reference

Teams
- San Francisco Giants (2023–2025); Atlanta Braves (2025)

Brett Michael Wisely (born May 8, 1999) is an American professional baseball second baseman for the Atlanta Braves of Major League Baseball (MLB). He has previously played in MLB for the San Francisco Giants. Wisely played college baseball at Gulf Coast State College and was selected by the Tampa Bay Rays in the 15th round in the 2019 MLB draft. He made his MLB debut in 2023.

== High school ==
Wisely attended Sandalwood High School in Jacksonville, Florida, and played on their baseball team. As a senior in 2017, he batted .514 with six home runs as a leadoff hitter, alongside leading the area with 11 wins and 1.25 ERA while striking out 88 batters over 67 innings. He was named the Times-Union's All-First Coast baseball player of the year.

== College ==
Wisely then played two years of college baseball at Gulf Coast State College. In 2019, he hit .361/.439/.642(sixth in the conference) with ten home runs, 50 RBIs, and ten stolen bases in 158 at bats over 48 games, while as a pitcher he was 6-3 with a 2.87 ERA in 78.1 innings in which he struck out 89 batters while walking 14 batters, and pitched six complete games in 12 starts. Following the season's end, he was selected by the Tampa Bay Rays in the 15th round with the 458th overall pick in the 2019 Major League Baseball draft.

== Professional career ==
=== Tampa Bay Rays ===
Wisely signed with the Rays for a signing bonus of $125,000, and made his professional debut with the Princeton Rays, with whom he batted .274/.335/.441 in 179 at bats with 30 runs, five home runs, and 25 RBI over 47 games. He did not play in a game in 2020 due to the cancellation of the minor league season because of the COVID-19 pandemic.

Wisely opened the 2021 season with the Charleston RiverDogs, before being promoted to the Bowling Green Hot Rods. Over 100 games between both clubs, Wisely hit .301/.376/.503 in 386 at bats with 78 runs, 19 home runs, 74 RBI, and 31 stolen bases in 39 attempts. He was named an MiLB.com Organization All Star.

The Rays assigned Wisely to the Montgomery Biscuits to start the 2022 season, and promoted him to the Durham Bulls near the season's end. In 2022 over 117 games between the two teams, he slashed .273/.366/.455 with 15 home runs, 58 RBI, and 32 stolen bases while being caught 11 times. His 84 runs led the Southern League, his 23 doubles and his 62 walks were both tenth, his six triples were second, and his 31 steals were eighth in the league. He was named a Southern League post-season All Star. Between the two teams, in 2022 he played 56 games at second base, 19 at shortstop, and 15 at third base.

=== San Francisco Giants ===
On November 15, 2022, Wisely was traded to the San Francisco Giants in exchange for minor league outfielder Tristan Peters. The Giants subsequently added him to their 40-man roster.

Wisely made his MLB debut as a defensive replacement in center field on March 30, 2023, but did not record a plate appearance. He was optioned down to the Triple-A Sacramento River Cats on April 1, after Bryce Johnson was added to the active roster. Wisely was recalled to the Giants on April 18 and recorded his first major league hit on April 21, a single off Joey Lucchesi of the New York Mets. Wisely hit his first major league home run on May 6, off Tyson Miller of the Milwaukee Brewers. In 51 games during his rookie campaign, he batted .175/.231/.267 with two home runs, eight RBI, and two stolen bases.

Wisely was optioned to Triple–A Sacramento to begin the 2024 season. In 91 appearances for San Francisco, he slashed .238/.278/.345 with four home runs, 31 RBI, and two stolen bases.

Wisely was again optioned to Triple-A Sacramento to begin the 2025 season. In 22 appearances for San Francisco, he batted .208/.269/.354 with one home run, 10 RBI, and one stolen base. Wisely was designated for assignment by the Giants on September 15, 2025, following the promotion of Bryce Eldridge.

=== Atlanta Braves ===
On September 18, 2025, Wisely was claimed off waivers by the Atlanta Braves. He made four appearances for Atlanta, going 0-for-6 with three walks.

Wisely was designated for assignment by the Braves on January 9, 2026. On January 12, the Braves traded Wisely and Ken Waldichuk to the Tampa Bay Rays in exchange for cash considerations or a player to be named later. He was designated for assignment following the acquisition of Víctor Mesa Jr. on February 6. On February 10, Wisley was traded back to the Braves in exchange for cash considerations. On March 25, Wisely was designated for assignment by Atlanta after failing to make the team's Opening Day roster. He cleared waivers and was sent outright to the Triple–A Gwinnett Stripers on April 1. He played in 125 games with Gwinnett and batted .281 with 11 home runs, 65 RBI, and 29 stolen bases.

On October 15, 2026, the Braves added Wisely to their 40-man roster.
