= Alex Wood (baseball) =

American baseball player (born 1991)

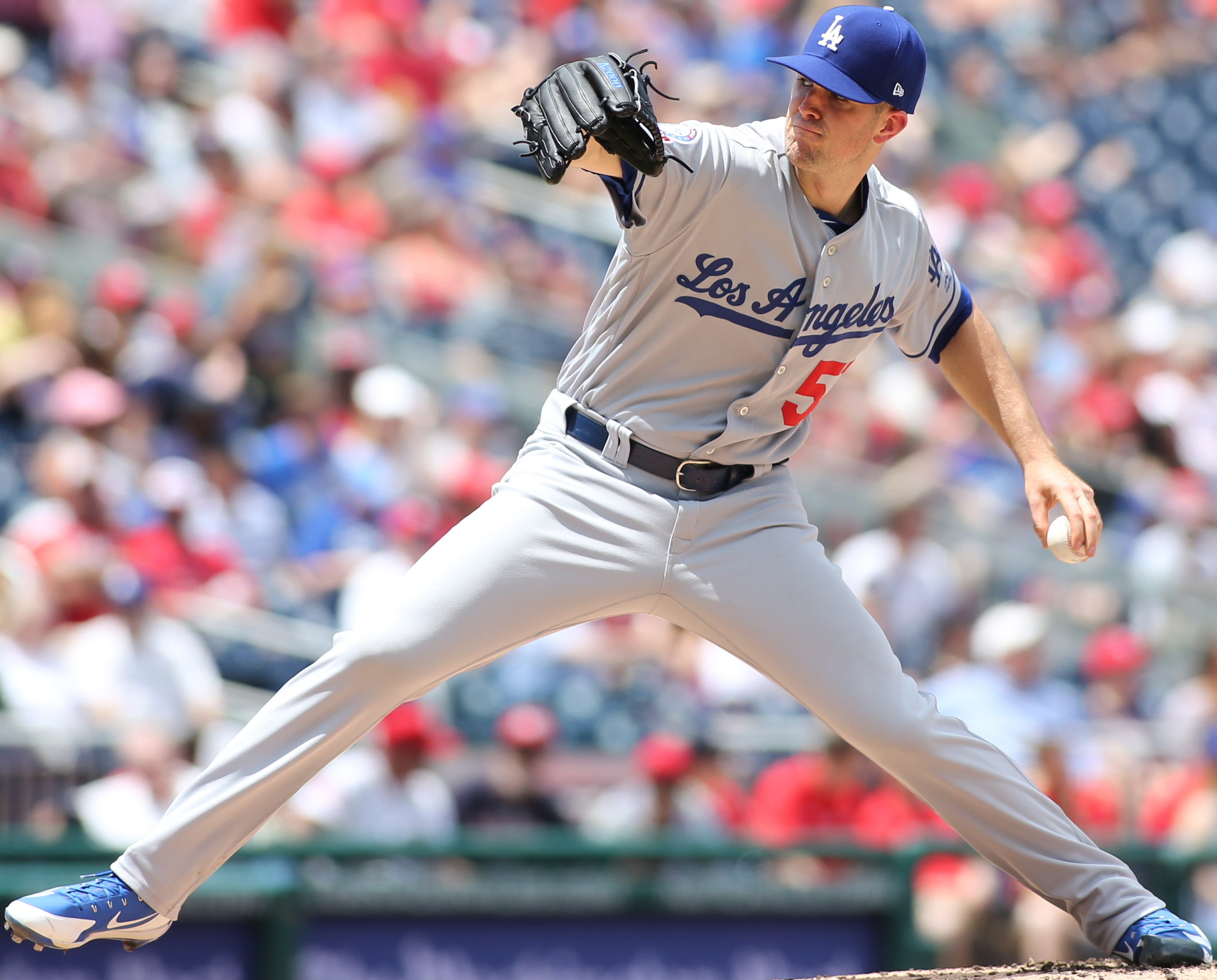
- Wood with the Los Angeles Dodgers in 2018
- Pitcher
- Born: January 12, 1991 (age 35); Charlotte, North Carolina, U.S.
- Batted: Right Threw: Left

MLB debut
- May 30, 2013, for the Atlanta Braves

Last MLB appearance
- May 12, 2024, for the Oakland Athletics

MLB statistics
- Win–loss record: 77–68
- Earned run average: 3.78
- Strikeouts: 1,173
- Stats at Baseball Reference

Teams
- Atlanta Braves (2013–2015); Los Angeles Dodgers (2015–2018); Cincinnati Reds (2019); Los Angeles Dodgers (2020); San Francisco Giants (2021–2023); Oakland Athletics (2024)

Career highlights and awards
- All-Star (2017); World Series champion (2020)

Robert Alexander Wood (born January 12, 1991) is an American former professional baseball pitcher. He played 12 seasons in Major League Baseball (MLB) for the Atlanta Braves, Los Angeles Dodgers, Cincinnati Reds, San Francisco Giants, and Oakland Athletics.

Wood played college baseball for the Georgia Bulldogs. He was selected by the Braves in the second round of the 2012 MLB draft, and made his MLB debut in 2013. With the Dodgers, he was an All-Star in 2017 and won the 2020 World Series.

== Early life ==
Wood was born in Charlotte, North Carolina. He attended Ardrey Kell High School, where he played for the school's baseball team. In 2009, he helped lead the Ardrey Kell baseball team to the NCHSAA 4A state title and was also named the North Carolina 4A player of the year.

Wood enrolled at the University of Georgia, where he played college baseball for the Georgia Bulldogs baseball team. He was redshirted during his first season at Georgia due to having Tommy John surgery after his senior year of high school. At Georgia, Wood had a 13–10 win–loss record and a 3.57 earned run average (ERA) in 32 games pitched. He struck out 180 batters and walked 47 in 204 1/3 innings. He was voted 2nd team All-SEC in 2012.

== Professional career ==
=== Atlanta Braves (2012–15) ===
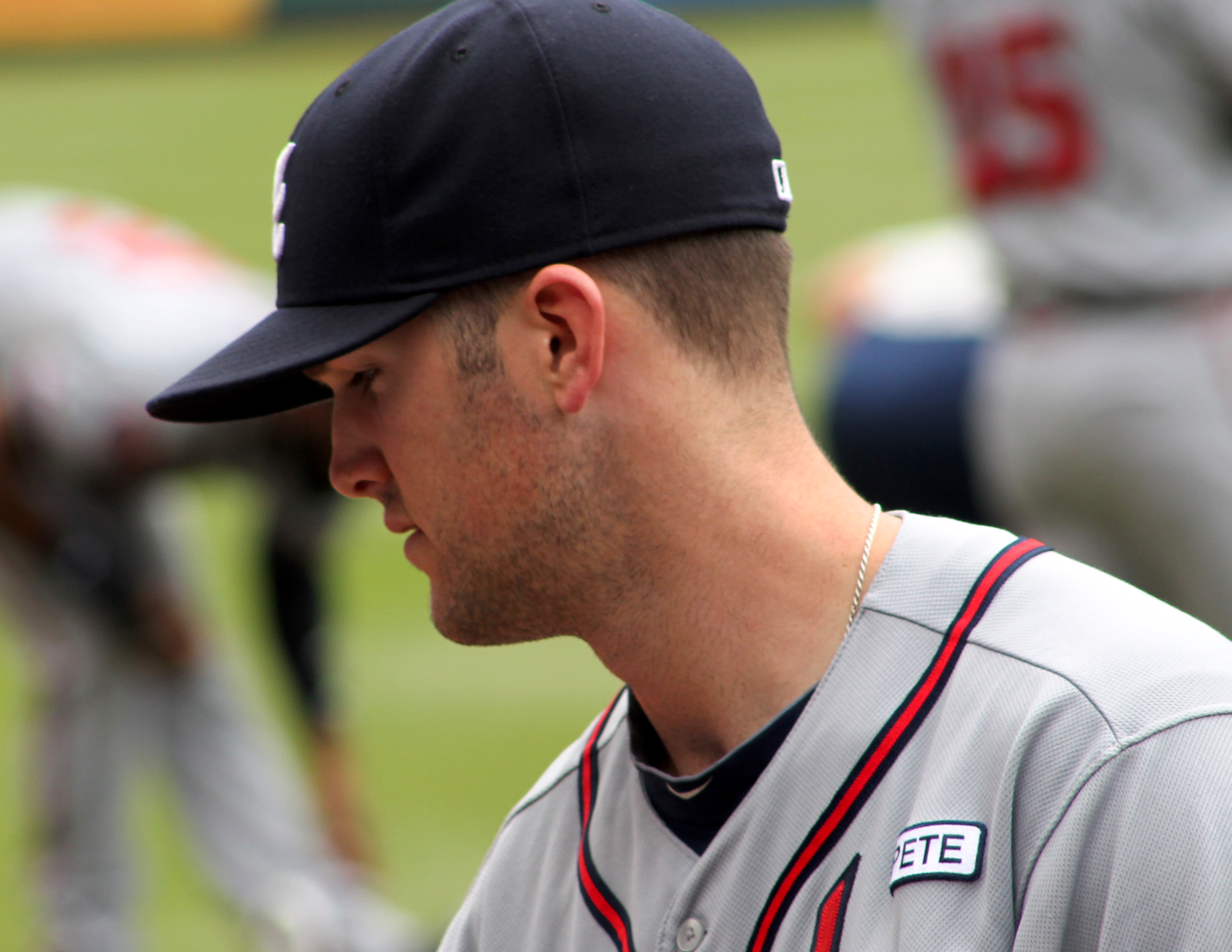
Wood before an Atlanta Braves game (2014)

The Atlanta Braves drafted Wood in the second round of the 2012 Major League Baseball draft, and he signed for a signing bonus of $700,000. He played for the Rome Braves of the Class A South Atlantic League in 2012, where he pitched in 13 games, going 4–3 with a 2.22 earned run average (ERA) and 52 strikeouts.

He began the 2013 season with the Mississippi Braves of the Class AA Southern League. With Mississippi, he was 4–2 with a 1.26 ERA in 57 innings, and with Gwinnett, he was 1–0 with a 1.80 ERA in five innings. He was named an MiLB.com 2013 Organization All Star.

After pitching in ten games the first two months of the season and posting an ERA of 1.26, the Braves promoted him to the major leagues on May 30. That night, in his major league debut, he pitched the ninth inning against the Toronto Blue Jays. Wood made his first major league start on June 18, 2013, where he allowed one run and earned his first loss.

Wood finished the 2014 season with an 11–11 record and a 2.78 ERA in 171.2 innings with 170 strikeouts.

Beginning 2015 with Atlanta, Wood was 7–6 with a 3.54 ERA. In 20 starts, he pitched 119.1 innings.

=== Los Angeles Dodgers (2015–18) ===
On July 30, 2015, in a three-team trade, the Los Angeles Dodgers acquired Wood, Mat Latos, Michael Morse, Bronson Arroyo, Jim Johnson, Luis Avilán, and José Peraza, while the Miami Marlins acquired minor league pitchers Victor Araujo, Jeff Brigham, and Kevin Guzman, and the Braves received Héctor Olivera, Paco Rodriguez, minor league pitcher Zachary Bird and a competitive balance draft pick for the 2016 MLB draft. He joined the Dodgers starting rotation and was 5–6 with a 4.35 ERA in 12 starts for them.

Wood began 2016 in the Dodgers starting rotation. He made 10 starts in April and May and was 1–4 with a 3.99 ERA. On May 21 against the San Diego Padres he struck out a career high 13 batters in only six innings of work, the first Dodgers pitcher in history to have struck out that many in so few innings. However, he reported that he was not feeling 100% after a May 30 outing against the Chicago Cubs. An MRI exam the next day revealed a posterior impingement in his left elbow, requiring four weeks of rest, and he was placed on the disabled list. On June 16, he reported that the infringement subsided after he had some fluid drained from his elbow and he would be cleared to resume a throwing program a few days earlier than expected. He threw a simulated game against minor league hitters on July 16 and early reports were that it went well. However, shortly afterwards it was determined that he would need elbow debridement surgery, which would cause him to miss an additional two months. He did not rejoin the Dodgers roster until September 20. Overall, he appeared in 14 games for the Dodgers in 2016 (10 starts) and was 1–4 with a 3.73 ERA. The Dodgers did not carry Wood on their roster for the first round of the playoffs, but on October 15, he was added to their roster for the league championship series. He pitched two scoreless innings in that series. After the season, Wood signed a $2.8 million contract with the Dodgers for 2017, avoiding salary arbitration.

After beginning the 2017 season in the bullpen, Wood moved to the rotation after an injury to Rich Hill. He won the National League Player of the Week Award for the week of May 8–14 after he pitched 11 scoreless innings with 21 strikeouts over two starts that week. A few weeks later he was also awarded with the National League Pitcher of the Month Award after he went 5–0 with a 1.27 ERA and 41 strikeouts in May. Wood eventually had his scoreless innings streak snapped at 28 on June 10. On July 5, Wood became the first Dodgers starting pitcher to begin the season 10–0 since Don Newcombe in 1955. On July 7, Wood was named to the 2017 Major League Baseball All-Star Game.

In 27 appearances for the Dodgers (25 starts and two early season relief appearances) in 2017 he was 16–3 with a 2.72 ERA and struck out 151 batters. He induced a 34.6% chase rate from batters that put him in the top 4% in the category in MLB. For his efforts, Wood received a single vote in 2017 National League Cy Young voting, tying him for ninth place with Jimmy Nelson. He allowed three runs in 4 2/3 innings in his one start in the 2017 NLCS but in the 2017 World Series he started game four and allowed only one run in 5 2/3 innings and then came back and pitched two shutout innings of relief in game seven.

In the off-season, Wood signed a one-year, $6 million contract, avoiding salary arbitration. In 2018, he went 9–7 in 33 appearances (27 starts) with a 3.63 ERA.

=== Cincinnati Reds (2019) ===
On December 21, 2018, the Dodgers traded Wood to the Cincinnati Reds, along with Matt Kemp, Yasiel Puig, Kyle Farmer, and cash considerations in exchange for Homer Bailey, Jeter Downs, and Josiah Gray. Wood came down with a back injury in spring training, and missed most of the season on the disabled list. He made seven starts and was 1–3 with a 5.80 ERA.

=== Los Angeles Dodgers (2020) ===
On January 12, 2020, Wood returned to the Dodgers on a one-year, $4 million deal. The Dodgers' 2020 season did not begin until late July as a result of the COVID-19 pandemic, and Wood made the start on July 25 against the San Francisco Giants. He struggled with his command in the outing, only lasting three innings, and was placed on the injured list after the game with left shoulder inflammation. He rejoined the active roster on September 1, though he was reduced to a bullpen role for the rest of the season.

Wood appeared in nine games (two starts) on the season, allowing nine earned runs in 12 2/3 innings for a career-worst 6.39 ERA, and a career-worst WHIP of 1.816, as he struck out 15 batters. He was left off the roster for the first two rounds of the playoffs but was added back to it for the NLCS, and he pitched 2 1/3 scoreless innings in the series. In the 2020 World Series against the Tampa Bay Rays, Wood appeared in two games, pitching four scoreless innings, as the Dodgers won the championship.

=== San Francisco Giants (2021–2023) ===
On January 14, 2021, Wood signed a one-year, $3 million deal with the San Francisco Giants. In the 2021 regular season, Wood was 10–4 with a 3.83 ERA. In 26 starts he pitched 138.2 innings in which he struck out 152 batters, averaging 9.9 strikeouts per 9 innings, and was 4th in the NL in hit batters (16).

On December 1, 2021, Wood re-signed with the Giants on a two-year, $25 million contract.

On June 23, 2022, Wood threw his 1,000th career strikeout against Travis d'Arnaud of the Atlanta Braves. In 2022, he was 8–12 with a 5.10 ERA in 26 starts, and pitched 130.2 innings in which he struck out 131 batters and hit 12 batters (8th in the NL).

=== Oakland Athletics (2024) ===
On February 2, 2024, Wood signed a one-year, $8.5 million contract with the Oakland Athletics. On March 19, Wood was named the A's opening day starter. Wood took the loss in his Oakland debut, giving up six runs on seven hits and a walk over 3 1/3 innings against the Cleveland Guardians. After nine starts, he was placed on the injured list with left rotator cuff tendinitis on May 15, and was transferred to the 60–day injured list on June 9. On July 25, it was announced that Wood would require season–ending shoulder surgery.

On August 8, 2025, Wood announced his retirement from professional baseball via an Instagram post.

== Pitching style ==
Wood pitches with a herky-jerky three-quarters delivery. He throws a four-seam fastball 91 to 95 miles per hour (146–153 km/h), a two-seam sinker 91 to 95 mph (146 to 153 km/h), a changeup 84 to 85 miles per hour (135–137 km/h), and a knuckle curve 79 to 81 miles per hour (127–130 km/h).

== Personal life ==
Wood married his longtime girlfriend, Suzanna Villarreal, a realtor, on November 25, 2017, in Atlanta, Georgia. They reside in Atlanta.

== See also ==
- List of baseball players who underwent Tommy John surgery
- List of World Series starting pitchers

Awards and achievements
Preceded by Iván Nova	National League; Pitcher of the Month; May 2017	Succeeded by Max Scherzer
