= 2022 San Francisco Giants season =

2022 San Francisco Giants
- League: National League
- Division: West
- Ballpark: Oracle Park
- City: San Francisco, California
- Record: 81–81 (.500)
- Divisional place: 3rd
- Owners: Charles B. Johnson (Majority shareholder); Greg E. Johnson (Chairman)
- President: Larry Baer
- President of baseball operations: Farhan Zaidi
- Managers: Gabe Kapler
- Television: NBC Sports Bay Area/KNTV (Duane Kuiper, Mike Krukow, Dave Flemming, Jon Miller, Shawn Estes, Javier López, Hunter Pence, J. T. Snow, Randy Winn)
- Radio: KNBR (104.5 FM and 680 AM); San Francisco Giants Radio Network (Jon Miller, Dave Flemming, Duane Kuiper, Mike Krukow); KXZM (93.7 FM, Spanish) (Erwin Higueros, Tito Fuentes, Marvin Benard)
- Stats: ESPN.com; Baseball Reference

The 2022 San Francisco Giants season was the 140th season for the franchise in Major League Baseball, their 65th year in San Francisco, and their 23rd at Oracle Park. This was the third season under manager Gabe Kapler and also the first season since 2008 without longtime catcher Buster Posey, who retired the previous November.

On December 2, 2021, Commissioner of Baseball Rob Manfred announced a lockout of players, following expiration of the collective bargaining agreement (CBA) between the league and the Major League Baseball Players Association (MLBPA). On March 10, 2022, MLB and the MLBPA agreed to a new collective bargaining agreement, thus ending the lockout. Opening Day took place on April 7. Although MLB previously announced that several series would be cancelled due to the lockout, the agreement provides for a 162-game season, with originally canceled games to be made up via doubleheaders.

Despite starting the season with a 37–27 record, the Giants would go 44–54 the rest of the way, eliminating them from playoff contention after posting 107 wins the previous year.

== Offseason ==
=== Lockout ===
The expiration of the league's collective bargaining agreement (CBA) with the Major League Baseball Players Association occurred on December 1, 2021, with no new agreement in place. As a result, the team owners voted unanimously to lockout the players stopping all free agency and trades.

The parties came to an agreement on a new CBA on March 10, 2022.

=== Rule changes ===
Pursuant to the new CBA, several new rules were instituted for the 2022 season. The National League will adopt the designated hitter full-time, a draft lottery will be implemented, the postseason will expand from ten teams to twelve, and advertising patches will appear on player uniforms and helmets for the first time.

=== Transactions ===
- November 7, 2021 − The Giants declined to exercise their option on RHP Johnny Cueto, allowing him to become a free agent. The Giants exercised the 2022 contract option on IF Wilmer Flores, LHP José Álvarez, and RHP Jay Jackson. The Giants claimed three players off waivers RHP Hunter Harvey from Baltimore Orioles, OF Austin Dean from St. Louis Cardinals, and LHP Joe Palumbo from Texas Rangers.
- November 22, 2021 − The Giants resigned RHP Anthony DeSclafani to a three-year contract.
- November 22, 2021 − The Giants traded RHP Jay Jackson to the Atlanta Braves in exchange for cash considerations, and a player to be named later or additional cash considerations.
- November 30, 2021 − The Giants signed RHP Alex Cobb to a two-year contract with a club option for 2024.
- November 30, 2021 − The Giants avoided arbitration with RHP John Brebbia, LHP Jarlin García, and OF Austin Slater agreeing to one-year deals. The Giants tender contracts to arbitration-eligible players OF Mike Yastrzemski, OF Darin Ruf, C Curt Casali, and RHP Dominic Leone. The Giants decline to tender the contracts on OF Luis González, RHP Sam Delaplane, and LHP Joe Palumbo, allowing them to become free agents.
- December 1, 2021 − The Giants resigned LHP Alex Wood to a two-year contract.
- March 14, 2022 − The Giants signed LHP Carlos Rodón to a two-year contract. Rodón can opt out of the contract after one year.

== Season standings ==
=== National League West ===
NL West
Team	W	L	Pct.	GB	Home	Road
Los Angeles Dodgers	111	51	.685	—	57‍–‍24	54‍–‍27
San Diego Padres	89	73	.549	22	44‍–‍37	45‍–‍36
San Francisco Giants	81	81	.500	30	44‍–‍37	37‍–‍44
Arizona Diamondbacks	74	88	.457	37	40‍–‍41	34‍–‍47
Colorado Rockies	68	94	.420	43	41‍–‍40	27‍–‍54

=== National League Wild Card ===
Division leaders
Team	W	L	Pct.
Los Angeles Dodgers	111	51	.685
Atlanta Braves	101	61	.623
St. Louis Cardinals	93	69	.574

Wild Card teams (Top 3 teams qualify for postseason)
Team	W	L	Pct.	GB
New York Mets	101	61	.623	+14
San Diego Padres	89	73	.549	+2
Philadelphia Phillies	87	75	.537	—
Milwaukee Brewers	86	76	.531	1
San Francisco Giants	81	81	.500	6
Arizona Diamondbacks	74	88	.457	13
Chicago Cubs	74	88	.457	13
Miami Marlins	69	93	.426	18
Colorado Rockies	68	94	.420	19
Pittsburgh Pirates	62	100	.383	25
Cincinnati Reds	62	100	.383	25
Washington Nationals	55	107	.340	32

=== Record vs. opponents ===
2022 National League record Source: MLB Standings Grid – 2022
Team	AZ	ATL	CHC	CIN	COL	LAD	MIA	MIL	NYM	PHI	PIT	SD	SF	STL	WSH	AL
Arizona	—	2–4	4–3	3–4	9–10	5–14	5–1	4–3	2–4	3–3	4–3	5–14	10–9	2–5	4–3	12–8
Atlanta	4–2	—	3–3	4–3	6–1	2–4	13–6	3–3	10–9	11–8	7–0	3–4	4–3	4–3	14–5	13–7
Chicago	3–4	3–3	—	11–8	3–4	0–7	4–2	10–9	4–3	6–0	10–9	2–5	2–5	6–13	4–2	6–14
Cincinnati	4–3	3–4	8–11	—	2–4	0–7	4–3	6–13	1–5	1–6	7–12	0–6	4–2	7–12	3–4	12–8
Colorado	10–9	1–6	4–3	4–2	—	8–11	2–4	3–4	2–5	2–5	3–3	10–9	5–14	2–4	3–4	9–11
Los Angeles	14–5	4–2	7–0	7–0	11–8	—	6–1	4–3	3–4	3–4	1–5	14–5	15–4	4–2	3–3	15–5
Miami	1–5	6–13	2–4	3–4	4–2	1–6	—	4–3	6–13	7–12	4–3	3–4	3–4	2–4	15–4	8–12
Milwaukee	3–4	3–3	9–10	13–6	4–3	3–4	3–4	—	2–4	2–4	11–8	3–4	3–4	9–10	3–3	15–5
New York	4–2	9–10	3–4	5–1	5–2	4–3	13–6	4–2	—	14–5	6–1	2–4	4–3	5–2	14–5	9–11
Philadelphia	3–3	8–11	0–6	6–1	5–2	4–3	12–7	4–2	5–14	—	6–1	4–3	1–5	4–3	16–3	9–11
Pittsburgh	3–4	0–7	9–10	12–7	3–3	5–1	3–4	8–11	1–6	1–6	—	2–4	1–5	6–13	4–3	4–16
San Diego	14–5	4–3	5–2	6–0	9–10	5–14	4–3	4–3	4–2	3–4	4–2	—	13–6	2–4	4–3	8–12
San Francisco	9–10	3–4	5–2	2–4	14–5	4–15	4–3	4–3	3–4	5–1	5–1	6–13	—	3–4	4–2	10–10
St. Louis	5–2	3–4	13–6	12–7	4–2	2–4	4–2	10–9	2–5	3–4	13–6	4–2	4–3	—	4–3	10–10
Washington	3–4	5–14	2–4	4–3	4–3	3–3	4–15	3–3	5–14	3–16	3–4	3–4	2–4	3–4	—	8–12

Updated with the results of all games through October 5, 2022.

== Game log ==
2022 Game Log: 81–81 (Home: 44–37; Away: 37–44)
April: 14–7 (Home: 6–4; Away: 8–3)

#	Date	Opponent	Score	Win	Loss	Save	Stadium	Attendance	Record
1	April 8	Marlins	6–5 (10)	**Álvarez** (1–0)	Bass (0–1)	—	**Oracle Park**	40,853	1–0
2	April 9	Marlins	1–2	Okert (1–0)	**McGee** (0–1)	Bender (1)	**Oracle Park**	38,885	1–1
3	April 10	Marlins	3–2	**García** (1–0)	Rogers (0–1)	**Leone** (1)	**Oracle Park**	37,332	2–1
4	April 11	Padres	2–4	Wilson (2–0)	**Rogers** (0–1)	Rogers (3)	**Oracle Park**	23,279	2–2
5	April 12	Padres	13–2	**Cobb** (1–0)	Darvish (0–1)	—	**Oracle Park**	25,560	3–2
6	April 13	Padres	2–1	**Webb** (1–0)	Manaea (1–1)	**Doval** (1)	**Oracle Park**	27,197	4–2
7	April 15	@ Guardians	4–1	**Rodón** (1–0)	Plesac (0–1)	**Doval** (2)	Progressive Field	33,469	5–2
8	April 16	@ Guardians	4–2	**Leone** (1–0)	Sandlin (0–1)	**McGee** (1)	Progressive Field	13,187	6–2
9	April 17	@ Guardians	8–1	**Wood** (1–0)	Civale (0–1)	—	Progressive Field	9,620	7–2
—	April 18	@ Mets	Postponed (rain); Makeup April 19						
10	April 19 (1)	@ Mets	4–5 (10)	Ottavino (1–0)	**García** (1–1)	—	Citi Field	27,490	7–3
11	April 19 (2)	@ Mets	1–3	Scherzer (3–0)	**Webb** (1–1)	May (1)	Citi Field	27,490	7–4
12	April 20	@ Mets	5–2	**Rodón** (2–0)	Bassitt (2–1)	**McGee** (2)	Citi Field	30,050	8–4
13	April 21	@ Mets	2–6	Carrasco (1–0)	**DeSclafani** (0–1)	—	Citi Field	28,760	8–5
14	April 22	@ Nationals	7–1	**Junis** (1–0)	Corbin (0–3)	—	Nationals Park	23,751	9–5
15	April 23	@ Nationals	5–2	**Wood** (2–0)	Sanchez (0–1)	**Doval** (3)	Nationals Park	27,799	10–5
16	April 24	@ Nationals	12–3	**Webb** (2–1)	Adon (1–3)	—	Nationals Park	26,003	11–5
17	April 25	@ Brewers	4–2	**McGee** (1–1)	Cousins (1–1)	**Doval** (4)	American Family Field	21,186	12–5
18	April 26	Athletics	8–2	**Rodón** (3–0)	Jefferies (1–3)	—	**Oracle Park**	32,898	13–5
19	April 27	Athletics	0–1	Blackburn (3–0)	**Long** (0–1)	Jiménez (4)	**Oracle Park**	32,014	13–6
20	April 29	Nationals	4–14	Sanchez (1–1)	**Wood** (2–1)	—	**Oracle Park**	38,256	13–7
21	April 30	Nationals	9–3	**Webb** (3–1)	Adon (1–4)	—	**Oracle Park**	33,241	14–7

May: 13–14 (Home: 7–7; Away: 6–7)

#	Date	Opponent	Score	Win	Loss	Save	Stadium	Attendance	Record
22	May 1	Nationals	5–11	Gray (3–2)	**Cobb** (1–1)	—	**Oracle Park**	38,451	14–8
23	May 3	@ Dodgers	1–3	Urías (2–1)	**Rodón** (3–1)	Kimbrel (5)	Dodger Stadium	43,370	14–9
24	May 4	@ Dodgers	1–9	Gonsolin (2–0)	**Wood** (2–2)	—	Dodger Stadium	52,203	14–10
25	May 5	Cardinals	1–7	Mikolas (2–1)	**Littell** (0–1)	—	**Oracle Park**	22,562	14–11
26	May 6	Cardinals	2–3	Helsley (1–0)	**Doval** (0–1)	Gallegos (6)	**Oracle Park**	28,898	14–12
27	May 7	Cardinals	13–7	**Webb** (4–1)	Matz (3–2)	—	**Oracle Park**	40,113	15–12
28	May 8	Cardinals	4–3	**Leone** (2–0)	Cabrera (1–1)	**Doval** (5)	**Oracle Park**	38,193	16–12
29	May 9	Rockies	8–5	**Rodón** (4–1)	Gomber (2–3)	—	**Oracle Park**	20,039	17–12
30	May 10	Rockies	9–2	**Wood** (3–2)	Senzatela (2–2)	—	**Oracle Park**	21,472	18–12
31	May 11	Rockies	7–1	**Cobb** (2–1)	Kuhl (3–1)	—	**Oracle Park**	23,341	19–12
32	May 13	@ Cardinals	8–2	**Webb** (5–1)	Hicks (1–3)	—	Busch Stadium	39,612	20–12
33	May 14	@ Cardinals	0–4	Hudson (3–2)	**Junis** (1–1)	—	Busch Stadium	44,537	20–13
34	May 15	@ Cardinals	6–15	Wainwright (4–3)	**Rodón** (4–2)	—	Busch Stadium	39,703	20–14
35	May 16	@ Rockies	7–6	**Brebbia** (1–0)	Bard (1–2)	**Doval** (6)	Coors Field	23,180	21–14
36	May 17	@ Rockies	10–7	**Cobb** (3–1)	Kuhl (3–2)	**Doval** (7)	Coors Field	25,735	22–14
37	May 18	@ Rockies	3–5	Kinley (1–0)	**Álvarez** (1–1)	Bard (10)	Coors Field	26,713	22–15
38	May 20	Padres	7–8 (10)	García (2–2)	**Doval** (0–2)	Suárez (1)	**Oracle Park**	31,359	22–16
39	May 21	Padres	1–2	Musgrove (5–0)	**Rodón** (4–3)	Rogers (16)	**Oracle Park**	38,916	22–17
40	May 22	Padres	1–10	Gore (3–1)	**Wood** (3–3)	—	**Oracle Park**	35,363	22–18
41	May 23	Mets	3–13	Peterson (2–0)	**Cobb** (3–2)	—	**Oracle Park**	25,690	22–19
42	May 24	Mets	13–12	**Brebbia** (2–0)	Díaz (1–1)	—	**Oracle Park**	27,683	23–19
43	May 25	Mets	9–3	**Junis** (2–1)	Szapucki (0–1)	—	**Oracle Park**	27,432	24–19
44	May 27	@ Reds	1–5	Ashcraft (1–0)	**Rodón** (4–4)	Warren (3)	Great American Ball Park	19,000	24–20
45	May 28	@ Reds	2–3	Gutiérrez (1–6)	**Wood** (3–4)	Santillan (3)	Great American Ball Park	26,655	24–21
46	May 29	@ Reds	6–4	**Brebbia** (3–0)	Warren (2–2)	—	Great American Ball Park	20,439	25–21
47	May 30	@ Phillies	5–4 (10)	**Leone** (3–0)	Bellatti (1–1)	**Doval** (8)	Citizens Bank Park	26,650	26–21
48	May 31	@ Phillies	7–4 (11)	**Álvarez** (2–1)	Bellatti (1–2)	—	Citizens Bank Park	20,927	27–21

June: 13–13 (Home: 8–6; Away: 5–7)

#	Date	Opponent	Score	Win	Loss	Save	Stadium	Attendance	Record
49	June 1	@ Phillies	5–6	Nola (3–4)	**García** (1–2)	Knebel (9)	Citizens Bank Park	22,213	27–22
50	June 2	@ Marlins	0–3	Alcántara (6–2)	**Wood** (3–5)	Scott (2)	loanDepot Park	8,202	27–23
51	June 3	@ Marlins	15–6	**Littell** (1–1)	Bleier (0–1)	—	loanDepot Park	6,512	28–23
52	June 4	@ Marlins	4–5	Scott (1–1)	**Rogers** (0–2)	—	loanDepot Park	7,515	28–24
53	June 5	@ Marlins	5–1	**Junis** (3–1)	Garrett (0–1)	—	loanDepot Park	9,641	29–24
54	June 7	Rockies	3–5	Márquez (2–5)	**Littell** (1–2)	Bard (12)	**Oracle Park**	24,785	29–25
55	June 8	Rockies	2–1 (10)	**Doval** (1–2)	Estévez (1–3)	—	**Oracle Park**	21,535	30–25
56	June 9	Rockies	2–4	Gomber (3–6)	**Webb** (5–2)	Colomé (3)	**Oracle Park**	23,780	30–26
57	June 10	Dodgers	7–2	**Junis** (4–1)	Buehler (6–3)	—	**Oracle Park**	39,701	31–26
58	June 11	Dodgers	3–2	**Doval** (2–2)	Kershaw (4–1)	**Álvarez** (1)	**Oracle Park**	41,236	32–26
59	June 12	Dodgers	2–0	**Rodón** (5–4)	Urías (3–6)	**McGee** (3)	**Oracle Park**	41,197	33–26
60	June 13	Royals	6–2	**Wood** (4–5)	Garrett (1–1)	—	**Oracle Park**	22,185	34–26
61	June 14	Royals	4–2	**Webb** (6–2)	Bubic (0–4)	**Doval** (9)	**Oracle Park**	24,386	35–26
62	June 15	Royals	2–3	Cuas (1–0)	**Brebbia** (3–1)	Barlow (7)	**Oracle Park**	25,527	35–27
63	June 17	@ Pirates	2–0	**Rodón** (6–4)	Thompson (3–5)	**Doval** (10)	PNC Park	19,075	36–27
64	June 18	@ Pirates	7–5	**Wood** (5–5)	Crowe (3–4)	**Doval** (11)	PNC Park	26,041	37–27
65	June 19	@ Pirates	3–4	Bednar (3–1)	**Rogers** (0–3)	—	PNC Park	23,905	37–28
66	June 20	@ Braves	1–2	Jansen (4–0)	**Doval** (1–2)	—	Truist Park	40,589	37–29
67	June 21	@ Braves	12–10	**Rogers** (1–3)	O'Day (1–1)	—	Truist Park	35,384	38–29
68	June 22	@ Braves	3–4	Minter (3–1)	**McGee** (1–2)	—	Truist Park	38,478	38–30
69	June 23	@ Braves	6–7	Wright (8–4)	**Wood** (5–6)	Jansen (19)	Truist Park	36,870	38–31
70	June 24	Reds	2–4	Ashcraft (4–1)	**Cobb** (3–3)	Strickland (3)	**Oracle Park**	29,178	38–32
71	June 25	Reds	9–2	**Webb** (7–2)	Minor (1–4)	—	**Oracle Park**	40,115	39–32
72	June 26	Reds	3–10	Mahle (3–6)	**DeSclafani** (0–2)	—	**Oracle Park**	32,285	39–33
73	June 28	Tigers	4–3	**Rodón** (7–4)	Skubal (5–6)	**Doval** (12)	**Oracle Park**	28,004	40–33
74	June 29	Tigers	2–3	García (3–2)	**Wood** (5–7)	Soto (15)	**Oracle Park**	26,576	40–34

July: 11–17 (Home: 8–6; Away: 3–11)

#	Date	Opponent	Score	Win	Loss	Save	Stadium	Attendance	Record
75	July 1	White Sox	0–1	Banks (1–0)	**Doval** (2–4)	Graveman (4)	**Oracle Park**	35,266	40–35
76	July 2	White Sox	3–5	Cease (7–3)	**Webb** (7–3)	Graveman (5)	**Oracle Park**	30,804	40–36
77	July 3	White Sox	4–13	Giolito (5–4)	**Hjelle** (0–1)	—	**Oracle Park**	30,155	40–37
78	July 4	@ Diamondbacks	3–8	Bumgarner (4–8)	**Rodón** (7–5)	—	Chase Field	27,752	40–38
79	July 5	@ Diamondbacks	2–6	Smith (1–1)	**Leone** (3–1)	—	Chase Field	14,467	40–39
80	July 6	@ Diamondbacks	7–5	**Brebbia** (4–1)	Mantiply (1–2)	**Long** (1)	Chase Field	13,445	41–39
81	July 7	@ Padres	1–2 (10)	Crismatt (5–1)	**García** (1–3)	—	Petco Park	42,656	41–40
82	July 8	@ Padres	3–6	Snell (1–5)	**Long** (0–2)	Martinez (3)	Petco Park	42,861	41–41
83	July 9	@ Padres	3–1	**Rodón** (8–5)	García (4–5)	—	Petco Park	41,714	42–41
84	July 10	@ Padres	12–0	**Wood** (6–7)	Gore (4–4)	—	Petco Park	38,712	43–41
85	July 11	Diamondbacks	3–4	Kelly (8–5)	**Cobb** (3–4)	Melancon (12)	**Oracle Park**	25,325	43–42
86	July 12	Diamondbacks	13–0	**Webb** (8–3)	Keuchel (2–7)	—	**Oracle Park**	23,353	44–42
87	July 13	Diamondbacks	4–3	**Doval** (3–4)	Melancon (3–8)	—	**Oracle Park**	27,055	45–42
88	July 14	Brewers	2–3 (10)	Gott (2–2)	**Doval** (3–5)	Williams (6)	**Oracle Park**	26,994	45–43
89	July 15	Brewers	8–5	**Long** (1–2)	Hader (0–4)	—	**Oracle Park**	28,244	46–43
90	July 16	Brewers	2–1	**Brebbia** (5–1)	Suter (1–3)	**Leone** (2)	**Oracle Park**	41,279	47–43
91	July 17	Brewers	9–5	**Webb** (9–3)	Ashby (2–7)	—	**Oracle Park**	30,584	48–43
–	July 19	**92nd All-Star Game in Los Angeles, CA**							
92	July 21	@ Dodgers	6–9	Phillips (4–3)	**Leone** (3–2)	Kimbrel (16)	Dodger Stadium	53,165	48–44
93	July 22	@ Dodgers	1–5	Vesia (2–0)	**Long** (1–3)	—	Dodger Stadium	51,316	48–45
94	July 23	@ Dodgers	2–4	Urías (9–6)	**Wood** (6–8)	Price (1)	Dodger Stadium	47,749	48–46
95	July 24	@ Dodgers	4–7	Phillips (5–3)	**Leone** (3–3)	Kimbrel (17)	Dodger Stadium	47,505	48–47
96	July 25	@ Diamondbacks	0–7	Kelly (10–5)	**Junis** (4–2)	—	Chase Field	16,100	48–48
97	July 26	@ Diamondbacks	3–7	Kennedy (4–4)	**Rodón** (8–6)	—	Chase Field	16,989	48–49
98	July 27	@ Diamondbacks	3–5	Ramirez (3–3)	**Webb** (9–4)	Melancon (14)	Chase Field	17,043	48–50
99	July 28	Cubs	4–2	**Wood** (7–8)	Steele (4–7)	**Doval** (17)	**Oracle Park**	32,259	49–50
100	July 29	Cubs	2–4	Stroman (3–5)	**Cobb** (3–5)	—	**Oracle Park**	30,376	49–51
101	July 30	Cubs	5–4	**Rogers** (2–3)	Smyly (3–6)	**Leone** (3)	**Oracle Park**	40,971	50–51
102	July 31	Cubs	4–0	**Rodón** (9–6)	Sampson (0–2)	—	**Oracle Park**	33,622	51–51

August: 10–16 (Home: 5–9; Away: 5–7)

#	Date	Opponent	Score	Win	Loss	Save	Stadium	Attendance	Record
103	August 1	Dodgers	2–8	Ferguson (1–0)	**Webb** (9–5)	—	**Oracle Park**	34,865	51–52
104	August 2	Dodgers	5–9	Anderson (12–1)	**Wood** (7–9)	—	**Oracle Park**	32,798	51–53
105	August 3	Dodgers	0–3	Urías (11–6)	**Cobb** (3–6)	Kimbrel (19)	**Oracle Park**	35,400	51–54
106	August 4	Dodgers	3–5	Martin (2–0)	**Junis** (4–3)	Kimbrel (20)	**Oracle Park**	34,640	51–55
107	August 6	@ Athletics	7–3	**Rodón** (10–6)	Oller (1–5)	—	Oakland Coliseum	40,065	52–55
108	August 7	@ Athletics	6–4	**Webb** (10–5)	Martínez (2–3)	**Doval** (14)	Oakland Coliseum	31,605	53–55
109	August 8	@ Padres	1–0	**Wood** (8–9)	Snell (4–6)	**Doval** (15)	Petco Park	40,686	54–55
110	August 9	@ Padres	4–7	Hill (3–0)	**Rogers** (2–4)	—	Petco Park	38,626	54–56
111	August 10	@ Padres	7–13	Suárez (3–1)	**Marte** (0–1)	—	Petco Park	32,834	54–57
112	August 12	Pirates	5–3	**Rodón** (11–6)	Wilson (2–7)	**Doval** (16)	**Oracle Park**	33,328	55–57
113	August 13	Pirates	2–0	**Webb** (11–5)	Beede (1–2)	**Doval** (17)	**Oracle Park**	38,049	56–57
114	August 14	Pirates	8–7	**Doval** (4–5)	Crowe (4–7)	—	**Oracle Park**	36,471	57–57
115	August 15	Diamondbacks	6–1	**Cobb** (4–6)	Bumgarner (6–12)	—	**Oracle Park**	20,694	58–57
116	August 16	Diamondbacks	2–1	**Brebbia** (6–1)	Kennedy (4–6)	—	**Oracle Park**	20,897	59–57
117	August 17	Diamondbacks	2–3	Ramirez (4–3)	**Leone** (3–4)	Melancon (17)	**Oracle Park**	22,649	59–58
118	August 18	Diamondbacks	0–5	Gallen (9–2)	**Webb** (11–6)	—	**Oracle Park**	26,197	59–59
119	August 19	@ Rockies	4–7	Ureña (2–4)	**Wood** (8–10)	Bard (25)	Coors Field	31,604	59–60
120	August 20	@ Rockies	3–4 (10)	Gilbreath (2–0)	**Doval** (4–6)	—	Coors Field	35,278	59–61
121	August 21	@ Rockies	9–8 (11)	**Leone** (4–4)	Bird (1–4)	**Littell** (1)	Coors Field	30,682	60–61
122	August 23	@ Tigers	3–1	**Rodón** (12–6)	Hutchison (1–7)	**Doval** (18)	Comerica Park	21,123	61–61
123	August 24	@ Tigers	1–6	Manning (1–1)	**Webb** (11–7)	—	Comerica Park	17,400	61–62
124	August 26	@ Twins	0–9	Ryan (10–6)	**Wood** (8–10)	—	Target Field	25,246	61–63
125	August 27	@ Twins	2–3 (10)	Durán (2–3)	**Leone** (4–5)	—	Target Field	27,570	61–64
126	August 28	@ Twins	3–8	Smeltzer (5–2)	**Junis** (4–2)	—	Target Field	25,285	61–65
127	August 29	Padres	5–6	Clevinger (5–5)	**Rodón** (12–7)	Martinez (7)	**Oracle Park**	24,815	61–66
128	August 30	Padres	3–4	Snell (6–7)	**Webb** (11–8)	Martinez (8)	**Oracle Park**	28,267	61–67
129	August 31	Padres	4–5	Musgrove (9–6)	**Wood** (8–12)	Hader (30)	**Oracle Park**	25,298	61–68

September: 18–10 (Home: 9–4; Away: 9–6)

#	Date	Opponent	Score	Win	Loss	Save	Stadium	Attendance	Record
130	September 2	Phillies	13–1	**Cobb** (5–6)	Gibson (9–6)	—	**Oracle Park**	32,840	62–68
131	September 3	Phillies	5–4	**Littell** (2–2)	Hand (3–2)	**Doval** (19)	**Oracle Park**	40,010	63–68
132	September 4	Phillies	5–3	**Doval** (5–6)	Robertson (3–2)	—	**Oracle Park**	41,189	64–68
133	September 5	@ Dodgers	7–4	**Webb** (12–8)	Heaney (2–2)	**Doval** (20)	Dodger Stadium	51,887	65–68
134	September 6	@ Dodgers	3–6	Anderson (14–3)	**García** (1–4)	Kimbrel (22)	Dodger Stadium	39,752	65–69
135	September 7	@ Dodgers	3–7	Phillips (6–3)	**Littell** (2–3)	—	Dodger Stadium	39,237	65–70
136	September 8 (1)	@ Brewers	1–2	Burnes (10–6)	**Junis** (4–5)	Williams (11)	American Family Field	see 2nd game	65–71
137	September 8 (2)	@ Brewers	2–4	Strzelecki (2–1)	**Young** (0–1)	Rogers (31)	American Family Field	23,019	65–72
138	September 9	@ Cubs	2–4	Smyly (6–8)	**Rodón** (12–8)	Hughes (4)	Wrigley Field	31,309	65–73
139	September 10	@ Cubs	5–2	**Webb** (13–8)	Stroman (3–7)	**Doval** (21)	Wrigley Field	40,086	66–73
140	September 11	@ Cubs	4–2	**Littell** (3–3)	Wesneski (1–1)	**Doval** (22)	Wrigley Field	30,004	67–73
141	September 12	Braves	3–2	**Cobb** (6–6)	Strider (10–5)	**Alexander** (1)	**Oracle Park**	23,790	68–73
142	September 13	Braves	1–5	Wright (18–5)	**Junis** (4–6)	—	**Oracle Park**	24,872	68–74
143	September 14	Braves	4–1	**Rodón** (13–8)	Morton (8–6)	**Doval** (23)	**Oracle Park**	25,093	69–74
144	September 16	Dodgers	0–5	May (2–2)	**Webb** (13–9)	—	**Oracle Park**	37,487	69–75
145	September 17	Dodgers	2–7	Urías (17–7)	**Hjelle** (0–2)	—	**Oracle Park**	40,171	69–76
146	September 18	Dodgers	3–4 (10)	Kimbrel (5–6)	**Brebbia** (6–2)	Bruihl (1)	**Oracle Park**	32,137	69–77
147	September 19	@ Rockies	10–7 (10)	**Doval** (6–6)	Hollowell (0–1)	**Alexander** (2)	Coors Field	23,055	70–77
148	September 20	@ Rockies	6–3	**Rogers** (3–4)	Freeland (9–10)	**García** (1)	Coors Field	23,942	71–77
149	September 21	@ Rockies	6–1	**Webb** (14–9)	Márquez (8–12)	—	Coors Field	23,293	72–77
150	September 22	@ Rockies	3–0	**Cotton** (3–2)	Ureña (3–7)	**Doval** (24)	Coors Field	25,669	73–77
151	September 23	@ Diamondbacks	6–5	**Young** (1–1)	Smith (1–3)	**Doval** (25)	Chase Field	25,949	74–77
152	September 24	@ Diamondbacks	2–5	Kelly (13–7)	**Cobb** (6–7)	Moronta (2)	Chase Field	24,504	74–78
153	September 25	@ Diamondbacks	3–2	**Junis** (5–6)	Frías (1–1)	**Doval** (26)	Chase Field	25,389	75–78
154	September 27	Rockies	5–2	**Webb** (15–9)	Márquez (8–13)	—	**Oracle Park**	24,218	76–78
155	September 28	Rockies	6–3	**Hjelle** (1–2)	Ureña (3–8)	—	**Oracle Park**	22,663	77–78
156	September 29	Rockies	6–4	**Rodón** (14–8)	Feltner (3–9)	**Doval** (27)	**Oracle Park**	24,112	78–78
157	September 30	Diamondbacks	10–4	**Cobb** (8–7)	Kelly (13–8)	—	**Oracle Park**	28,478	79–78

October: 2–3 (Home: 1–1; Away: 1–2)

#	Date	Opponent	Score	Win	Loss	Save	Stadium	Attendance	Record
158	October 1	Diamondbacks	4–8	Jameson (3–0)	**Junis** (5–7)	—	**Oracle Park**	30,630	79–79
159	October 2	Diamondbacks	4–3 (10)	**Cotton** (4–2)	Widener (0–1)	—	**Oracle Park**	34,824	80–79
160	October 3	@ Padres	4–7	Morejón (5–1)	**Miller** (0–1)	Hader (36)	Petco Park	31,687	80–80
161	October 4	@ Padres	2–6	Manaea (8–9)	**Cobb** (7–8)	—	Petco Park	32,884	80–81
162	October 5	@ Padres	8–1	**Marte** (1–1)	Stammen (1–2)	—	Petco Park	32,064	81–81

Legend: = Win = Loss = Postponement
**Bold** = Giants team member

== Roster ==
2022 San Francisco Giants
Roster
Pitchers: 54 Scott Alexander; 48 José Álvarez; 14 Tyler Beede; 59 John Brebbia; 76 Kervin Castro; 38 Alex Cobb; 47 Jharel Cotton; 26 Anthony DeSclafani; 75 Camilo Doval; 66 Jarlín García; 64 Sean Hjelle; 34 Jakob Junis; 52 Dominic Leone; 46 Zack Littell; 63 Mauricio Llovera; 73 Sammy Long; 74 Yunior Marte; 17 Jake McGee; 18 Shelby Miller; 60 Luis Ortiz; 16 Carlos Rodón; 71 Tyler Rogers; 78 Gregory Santos; 61 Thomas Szapucki; 67 Andrew Vasquez; 76 Cole Waites; 62 Logan Webb; 57 Alex Wood; 45 Alex Young	Catchers: 21 Joey Bart; 2 Curt Casali; 33 Andrew Knapp; 70 Michael Papierski; 14 Austin Wynns; Infielders: 9 Brandon Belt; 35 Brandon Crawford; 7 J. D. Davis; 39 Thairo Estrada; 41 Wilmer Flores; 70 Mike Ford; 8 Tommy La Stella; 10 Evan Longoria; 49 Dixon Machado; 49 Kevin Padlo; 65 Ford Proctor; 33 Darin Ruf; 70 David Villar; 32 Jason Vosler; 37 Donovan Walton; 45 Luke Williams	Outfielders: 29 Lewis Brinson; 1 Austin Dean; 1 Mauricio Dubón; 6 Steven Duggar; 61 Stuart Fairchild; 51 Luis González; 58 Bryce Johnson; 56 Jason Krizan; 6 Yermín Mercedes; 23 Joc Pederson; 53 Heliot Ramos; 13 Austin Slater; 60 Ka'ai Tom; 31 LaMonte Wade Jr.; 5 Mike Yastrzemski; Other batters: 2 Willie Calhoun	Manager: 19 Gabe Kapler; Coaches: 0 Craig Albernaz (bullpen, catching); 84 Andrew Bailey (pitching); 97 Brian Bannister (pitching director); 95 Alex Burg (bullpen catcher); 50 Kai Correa (bench); 85 Pedro Guerrero (assistant hitting); 91 Mark Hallberg (third base); 88 Dustin Lind (director of hitting); 87 J. P. Martinez (assistant pitching); 92 Alyssa Nakken (special assistant); 79 Nick Ortiz (quality control); 98 Fernando Perez (video coach); 00 Antoan Richardson (first base); 77 Justin Viele (hitting); 96 Brant Whiting (bullpen); 99 Taira Uematsu (assistant coach)

== Statistics ==
Updated through October 5.

=== Batting ===
Stats in bold are the team leaders.

Note: G = Games played; AB = At bats; R = Runs; H = Hits; 2B = Doubles; 3B = Triples; HR = Home runs; RBI = Runs batted in; BB = Walks; SO = Strikeouts; SB = Stolen bases; AVG = Batting average; OBP = On-base percentage; SLG = Slugging percentage; OPS = On base + slugging

Player	G	AB	R	H	2B	3B	HR	RBI	BB	SO	SB	AVG	OBP	SLG	OPS
Wilmer Flores	**151**	**525**	72	120	28	1	19	**71**	59	103	0	.229	.316	.394	.710
Thairo Estrada	140	488	71	**127**	23	2	14	62	33	89	**21**	**.260**	**.322**	**.400**	**.722**
Mike Yastrzemski	148	485	**73**	104	**31**	2	17	57	**61**	**141**	5	.214	.305	.392	.697
Brandon Crawford	118	407	50	94	15	2	9	52	39	98	1	.231	.308	.344	.652
Joc Pederson	134	380	57	104	19	**3**	**23**	70	42	100	3	.274	.353	.521	.874
Luis González	98	311	31	79	17	2	4	36	30	75	10	.254	.323	.360	.683
Austin Slater	125	277	49	73	15	2	7	34	40	89	12	.264	.366	.408	.774
Darin Ruf	90	268	46	58	9	0	11	38	40	85	2	.216	.328	.373	.701
Evan Longoria	89	266	31	65	13	0	14	42	27	83	0	.244	.315	.451	.767
Joey Bart	97	261	34	56	6	0	11	25	26	112	2	.215	.296	.364	.660
Brandon Belt	78	254	25	54	9	1	8	23	37	81	1	.213	.326	.350	.676
LaMonte Wade Jr.	77	217	29	45	7	1	8	26	26	51	1	.207	.305	.359	.665
Tommy La Stella	60	180	17	43	14	0	2	14	11	30	0	.239	.282	.350	.632
Austin Wynns	65	162	14	42	7	0	3	21	10	38	0	.259	.313	.358	.671
David Villar	52	156	21	36	6	1	9	24	18	58	0	.231	.331	.455	.787
J. D. Davis	49	137	20	36	8	0	8	14	19	56	0	.263	.361	.496	.857
Curt Casali	41	108	13	25	3	0	4	14	15	36	0	.231	.325	.370	.695
Jason Vosler	36	98	14	26	6	1	4	12	10	29	1	.265	.342	.469	.812
Donovan Walton	24	76	8	12	8	0	1	8	1	16	0	.158	.179	.303	.482
Yermín Mercedes	31	73	9	17	5	0	1	8	9	17	0	.233	.325	.342	.668
Mauricio Dubón	21	46	10	11	1	0	2	8	1	4	0	.239	.245	.391	.636
Lewis Brinson	16	36	5	6	2	0	3	4	2	14	1	.167	.211	.472	.683
Steven Duggar	12	36	2	7	3	0	0	4	2	16	4	.194	.231	.278	.509
Heliot Ramos	9	20	4	2	0	0	0	0	2	6	0	.100	.182	.100	.282
Bryce Johnson	11	18	1	2	0	0	0	2	1	7	0	.111	.158	.111	.269
Ford Proctor	7	18	3	2	0	0	1	6	2	3	0	.111	.182	.278	.460
Dixon Machado	5	15	1	3	0	0	0	0	1	5	0	.200	.294	.200	.494
Kevin Padlo	4	12	0	2	0	0	0	0	0	4	0	.167	.167	.167	.334
Luke Williams	8	12	1	3	1	0	0	3	0	4	0	.250	.250	.333	.583
Michael Papierski	5	9	1	0	0	0	0	0	1	4	0	.000	.100	.000	.100
Willie Calhoun	4	8	0	1	0	0	0	1	2	3	0	.125	.222	.125	.347
Austin Dean	3	8	1	3	0	0	0	0	1	0	0	.375	.444	.375	.819
Stuart Fairchild	5	8	1	0	0	0	0	0	0	3	0	.000	.000	.000	.000
Jason Krizan	3	8	0	1	0	0	0	0	2	3	0	.125	.300	.125	.425
Mike Ford	1	4	0	1	0	0	0	2	0	0	0	.250	.250	.250	.500
Andrew Knapp	8	4	2	1	0	0	0	2	2	0	0	.250	.429	.250	.679
Ka'ai Tom	1	1	0	0	0	0	0	0	0	0	0	.000	.000	.000	.000
**Team totals**	**162**	**5392**	**716**	**1261**	**255**	**18**	**183**	**683**	**571**	**1462**	**64**	**.234**	**.315**	**.390**	**.705**

=== Pitching ===
Stats in bold are the team leaders.

Note: W = Wins; L = Losses; ERA = Earned run average; G = Games pitched; GS = Games started; SV = Saves; IP = Innings pitched; H = Hits allowed; R = Runs allowed; ER = Earned runs allowed; BB = Walks allowed; K = Strikeouts

Player	W	L	ERA	G	GS	SV	IP	H	R	ER	BB	K
Logan Webb	**15**	9	2.90	32	**32**	0	**192.1**	**174**	76	62	49	163
Carlos Rodón	14	8	**2.88**	31	31	0	178.0	131	59	57	**52**	**237**
Alex Cobb	7	8	3.73	28	28	0	149.2	152	72	62	43	151
Alex Wood	8	**12**	5.10	26	26	0	130.2	132	**78**	**74**	30	131
Jakob Junis	5	7	4.42	23	17	0	112.0	120	57	55	25	98
Tyler Rogers	3	4	3.57	68	0	0	75.2	73	34	30	23	49
John Brebbia	6	2	3.18	**76**	11	0	68.0	71	27	24	18	54
Camilo Doval	6	6	2.53	68	0	**27**	67.2	54	27	19	30	80
Jarlin García	1	4	3.74	58	0	1	65.0	60	34	27	18	56
Dominic Leone	4	5	4.01	55	0	3	49.1	55	24	22	24	52
Yunior Marte	1	1	5.44	39	0	0	48.0	47	32	29	22	44
Zack Littell	3	3	5.08	39	0	1	44.1	48	25	25	13	39
Sam Long	1	3	3.61	28	6	1	42.1	39	23	17	14	33
Alex Young	1	1	2.39	24	1	0	26.1	28	11	7	11	20
Sean Hjelle	1	2	5.76	8	0	0	25.0	33	19	16	8	28
Jake McGee	1	2	7.17	24	0	3	21.1	27	18	17	6	11
Anthony DeSclafani	0	2	6.63	5	5	0	19.0	34	21	14	4	17
Scott Alexander	0	0	1.04	17	4	2	17.1	12	2	2	1	10
Mauricio Llovera	0	0	4.41	17	1	0	16.1	14	8	8	8	20
José Álvarez	2	1	5.28	21	0	1	15.1	17	10	9	9	15
Thomas Szapucki	0	0	1.98	10	0	0	13.2	12	3	3	4	16
Tyler Beede	0	0	4.66	6	0	0	9.2	14	5	5	6	4
Luis Ortiz	0	0	1.04	6	0	0	8.2	5	1	1	3	6
Jharel Cotton	2	0	6.75	5	0	0	8.0	11	7	6	4	8
Shelby Miller	0	1	6.43	4	0	0	7.0	6	5	5	3	14
Luis González	0	0	5.68	5	0	0	6.1	9	4	4	1	0
Cole Waites	0	0	3.18	7	0	0	5.2	6	2	2	4	4
Gregory Santos	0	0	4.91	2	0	0	3.2	3	2	2	3	2
Andrew Vasquez	0	0	0.00	1	0	0	2.0	0	0	0	1	4
Austin Wynns	0	0	13.50	2	0	0	2.0	3	3	3	1	0
Kervin Castro	0	0	27.00	2	0	0	1.2	4	5	5	2	4
Donovan Walton	0	0	27.00	1	0	0	1.0	3	3	3	1	0
**Team totals**	**81**	**81**	**3.85**	**162**	**162**	**39**	**1433.0**	**1397**	**697**	**613**	**441**	**1370**

== Farm system ==
Level	Team	League	Division	Manager	Record Type	Record	through
AAA	Sacramento River Cats	Pacific Coast League	West	Dave Brundage	Regular; Final Stretch	22–35 (.386); 0–0 (–)	June 10
AA	Richmond Flying Squirrels	Eastern League	Southwest	Dennis Pelfrey	Regular	31–23 (.574)	June 10
High-A	Eugene Emeralds	Northwest League	N/A	Carlos Valderrama	Regular	29–20 (.592)	June 10
Low-A	San Jose Giants	California League	North	Lipso Nava	Regular	32–22 (.593)	June 10
Rookie	ACL Giants Black	Arizona Complex League	East	Jose Montilla	Regular	3–0 (1.000)	June 10
Rookie	ACL Giants Orange	Arizona Complex League	East	Greg Tagert	Regular	1–2 (.333)	June 10
Foreign Rookie	DSL Giants Black	Dominican Summer League	San Pedro	Jose Montilla	Regular	1–2 (.333)	June 10
Foreign Rookie	DSL Giants Orange	Dominican Summer League	Northeast	Juan Ciriaco	Regular	1–2 (.333)	June 10
