= Jake McGee =

American baseball player (born 1986)

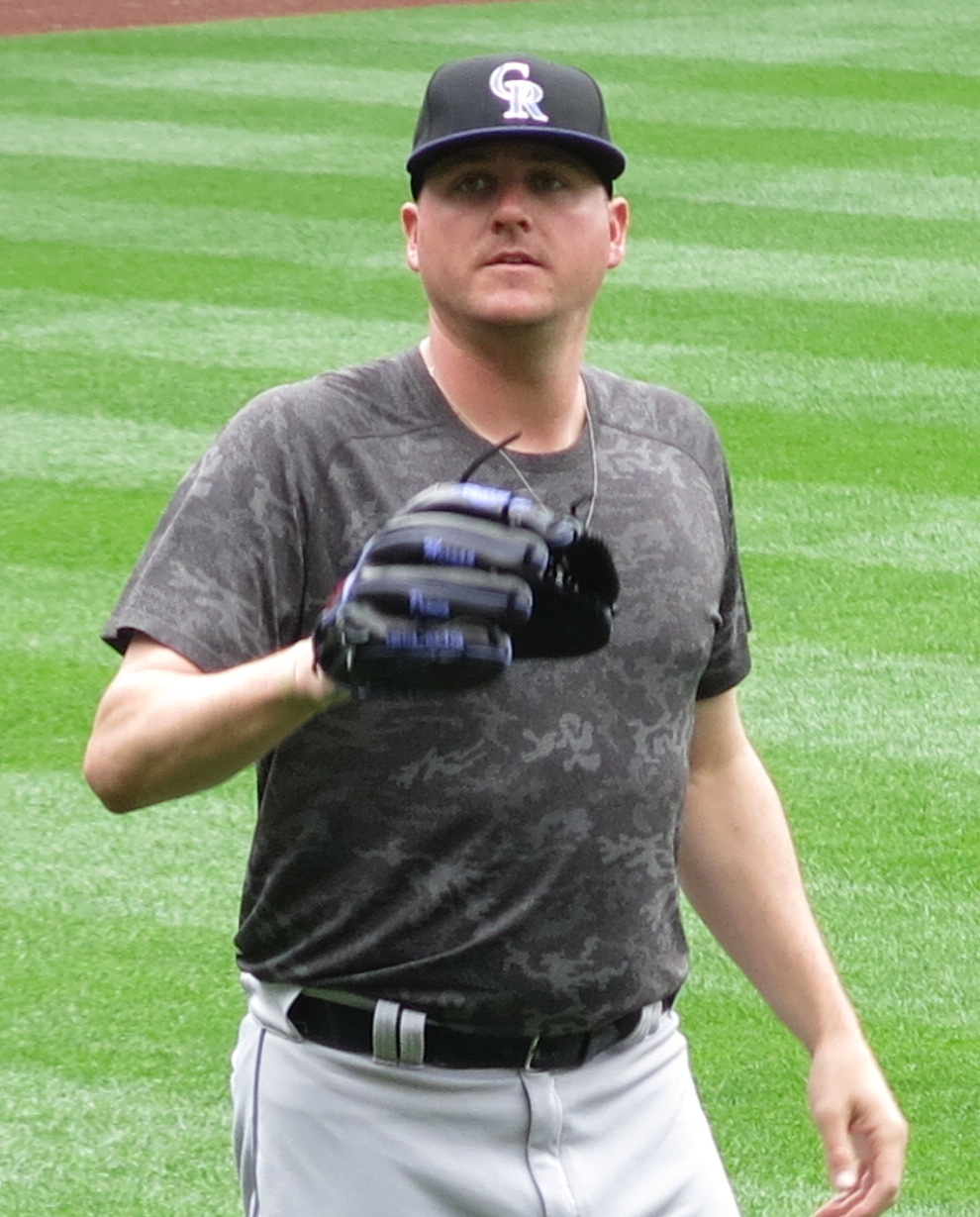
- McGee with the Colorado Rockies in 2016
- Pitcher
- Born: August 6, 1986 (age 40); San Jose, California, U.S.
- Batted: Left Threw: Left

MLB debut
- September 14, 2010, for the Tampa Bay Rays

Last MLB appearance
- September 8, 2022, for the Washington Nationals

MLB statistics
- Win–loss record: 32–28
- Earned run average: 3.71
- Strikeouts: 613
- Saves: 79
- Stats at Baseball Reference

Teams
- Tampa Bay Rays (2010–2015); Colorado Rockies (2016–2019); Los Angeles Dodgers (2020); San Francisco Giants (2021–2022); Milwaukee Brewers (2022); Washington Nationals (2022)

Career highlights and awards
- World Series champion (2020)
Medals
Men's baseball
Representing United States
World Baseball Classic
Gold medal – first place	2017 Los Angeles	Team

Jacob Daniel McGee (born August 6, 1986) is an American former professional baseball pitcher. McGee was selected by Tampa Bay Devil Rays in the fifth round of the 2004 MLB draft and made his Major League Baseball (MLB) debut in 2008. He played in MLB for the Tampa Bay Rays, Colorado Rockies, Los Angeles Dodgers, San Francisco Giants, Milwaukee Brewers, and Washington Nationals.

== Early life ==
McGee was born in San Jose, California. He grew up in Sparks, Nevada, where he attended Edward C. Reed High School. McGee was selected by the Tampa Bay Devil Rays in the fifth round (135th overall) of the 2004 MLB draft.

== Professional career ==
=== Tampa Bay Rays ===
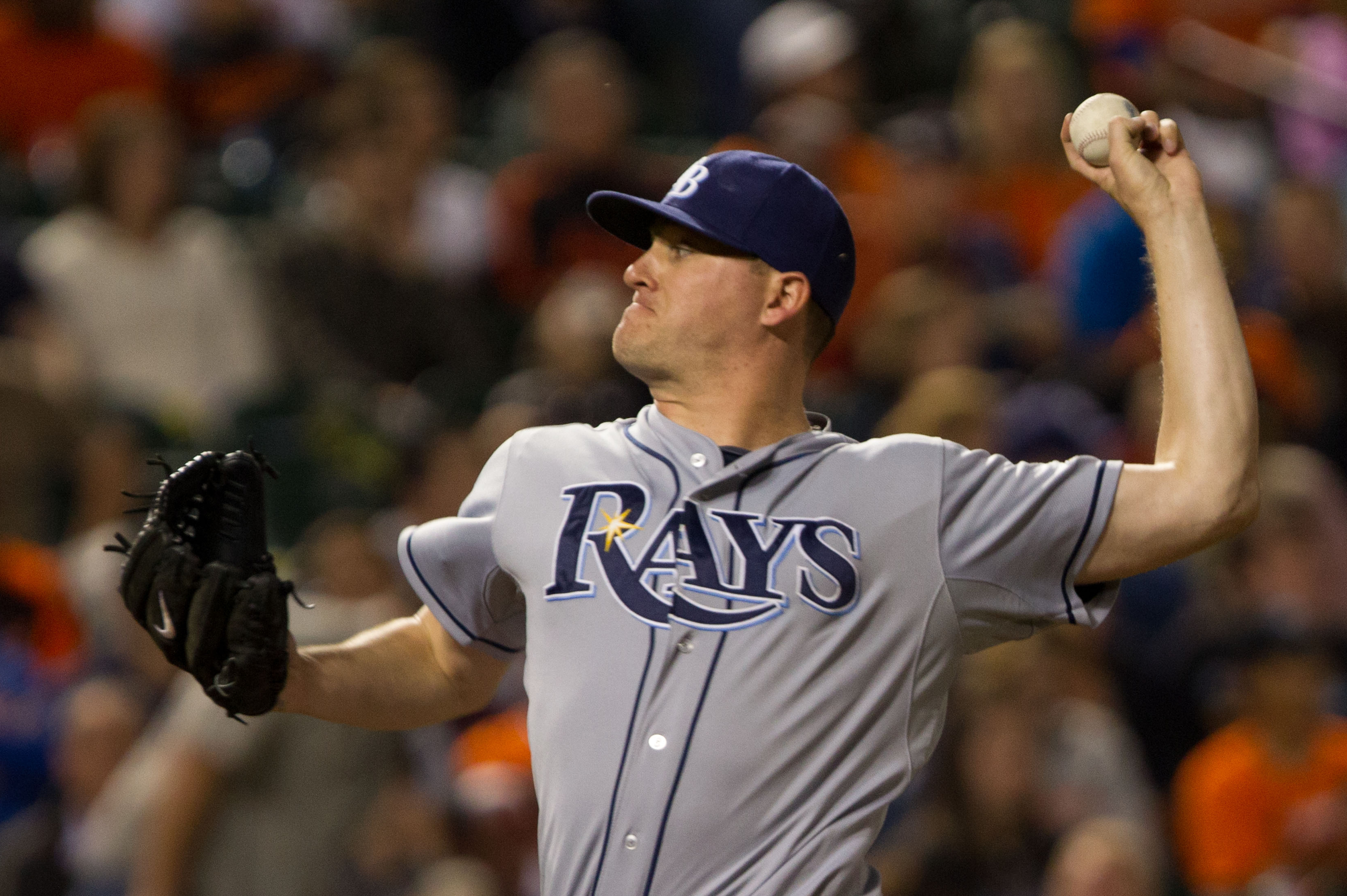
McGee with the Rays in 2012

McGee made his minor league debut in 2004, and spent 2004 and 2005 with the Princeton Devil Rays and the Hudson Valley Renegades. In 2006, McGee spent the year with the Southwest Michigan Devil Rays. He played with both the Vero Beach Devil Rays and the Montgomery Biscuits in 2007. He spent the entire 2008 with the Montgomery Biscuits, going 6–4 with 3.94 ERA. McGee was rated by Baseball America as the third-best organizational prospect for Tampa Bay Rays and 15th overall MLB prospect in 2008. In 2007, he was ranked 5th in the Rays' organization and 37th overall in all of baseball.

McGee is nicknamed "Clockhands". He earned the nickname due to his unconventional windup.

McGee underwent Tommy John surgery on July 8, 2008.

McGee was promoted to the MLB for the first time on September 14, 2010. He made his MLB debut that night against the New York Yankees, walking three batters and striking out Derek Jeter for his first MLB strikeout. McGee made the Rays MLB roster after spring training in 2011, but he was sent down to the team's Class AAA minor league affiliate after 11 appearances.

In the last few months of the 2014 season, McGee became the Rays' closer. He finished the season with 19 saves. After undergoing elbow surgery to remove "loose bodies" in December 2014, McGee spent the early portion of the 2015 season with the Triple-A Durham Bulls. He underwent knee surgery for a torn meniscus in late August, ending his season.

=== Colorado Rockies ===
On January 28, 2016, McGee and Germán Márquez were traded to the Colorado Rockies for Corey Dickerson and Kevin Padlo. McGee had a 4.73 ERA in the 2016 season. McGee and the Rockies avoided salary arbitration on December 3, 2016, by agreeing to a $5.9 million contract for the 2017 season. In 2017, McGee had an 0–2 win–loss record, a 3.61 ERA, and three saves in 62 games.

McGee signed a three-year, $27 million contract with the Rockies after the 2017 season. In 2018, McGee posted a career-worst 6.49 ERA in 61 games. McGee spent time on the disabled list in 2019, posting an ERA of 4.35 in 45 games. McGee was released by the Rockies on July 17, 2020.

=== Los Angeles Dodgers ===
On July 21, 2020, McGee signed a one-year contract with the Los Angeles Dodgers. In the pandemic shortened season, he appeared in 24 games with a 3–1 record and 2.66 ERA. McGee allowed one run in 1 1/3 innings over three games in the 2020 NLCS and pitched one scoreless inning in the 2020 World Series as the Dodgers won the championship.

=== San Francisco Giants ===
On February 17, 2021, McGee signed a two-year contract with the San Francisco Giants worth $7 million, with a club option for the 2023 season. McGee was named National League Reliever of the Month for July 2021, after not allowing a run in 11 innings and recording seven saves. He finished the 2021 season with 31 saves in 36 chances, as well as a 2.72 ERA and a 0.91 WHIP.

In 2022, McGee made 24 appearances for San Francisco but struggled to a 7.17 ERA with 11 strikeouts and three saves in 21 1/3 innings pitched. On July 9, 2022, McGee was designated for assignment after Luis González was activated off of the injured list. On July 14, McGee was released by the Giants.

=== Milwaukee Brewers ===
On July 22, 2022, McGee signed a one-year contract with the Milwaukee Brewers. In six appearances for Milwaukee, he struggled to a 6.35 ERA with four strikeouts across 5 2/3 innings pitched. On August 7, McGee was designated for assignment by the Brewers.

=== Washington Nationals ===
On August 9, 2022, McGee was claimed off waivers by the Washington Nationals. In 12 appearances for the Nationals, he struggled to an 0-1 record and 6.30 ERA with 10 strikeouts over 10 innings of work. On September 9, McGee was designated for assignment following the promotion of Israel Pineda. He was released on September 11.

McGee announced his retirement from professional baseball on February 3, 2023.

== Personal life ==
Jake and Morgan McGee have been married since December 2009. As of late 2015, they live in Tampa, Florida. For the last several years, the couple has purchased Christmas presents for foster children in Reno and Tampa.
