= Michael Papierski =

American baseball player (born 1996)

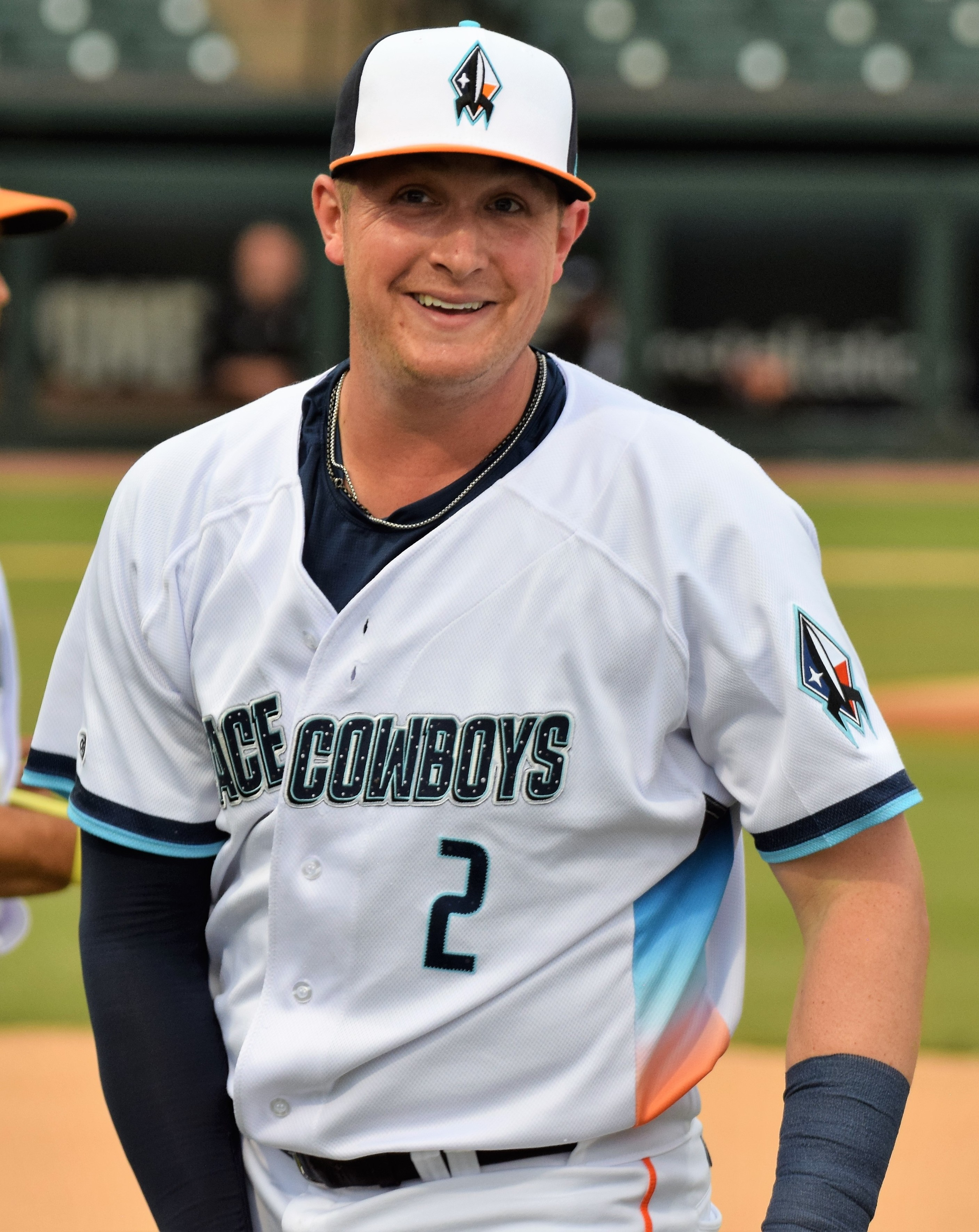
- Papierski with the Sugar Land Space Cowboys in 2022
- Catcher / First baseman
- Born: February 26, 1996 (age 30); Palos Heights, Illinois, U.S.
- Batted: Switch Threw: Right

MLB debut
- May 21, 2022, for the San Francisco Giants

Last MLB appearance
- August 21, 2022, for the Cincinnati Reds

MLB statistics
- Batting average: .143
- Home runs: 1
- Runs batted in: 4
- Stats at Baseball Reference

Teams
- San Francisco Giants (2022); Cincinnati Reds (2022)

Michael John Papierski (born February 26, 1996) is an American former professional baseball catcher and first baseman. He played in Major League Baseball (MLB) for the San Francisco Giants and Cincinnati Reds.

Papierski played college baseball for the LSU Tigers and was selected in the ninth round in the 2017 MLB draft by the Houston Astros. He made his MLB debut in May 2022 with the Giants.

== Early life and amateur career ==
Papierski grew up in Lemont, Illinois, and attended Lemont High School. He was selected in the 16th round of the 2014 Major League Baseball draft by the Toronto Blue Jays, but opted not to sign in favor of attending Louisiana State University (LSU).

Papierski played college baseball for the LSU Tigers for three seasons. He spent the majority of his freshman season as the backup to starting catcher Kade Scivicque. In 2015, he played collegiate summer baseball with the Yarmouth–Dennis Red Sox of the Cape Cod Baseball League. Papierski started 40 games at catcher and hit .242/.358/.387 in his sophomore season. As a junior, Papierski hit .256/.401/.477 with 11 home runs and 39 RBIs in 65 games, and was named to the SEC All-Defensive team after throwing out 23 baserunners.

== Professional career ==
=== Houston Astros ===
The Houston Astros selected Papierski in the ninth round of the 2017 Major League Baseball draft. After signing with the team he was assigned to the Tri-City ValleyCats of the New York–Penn League. Papierski spent the 2018 season with the Class A Quad Cities River Bandits.

He was assigned to the Fayetteville Woodpeckers of the Class A-Advanced Carolina League in 2019, where he batted .233/.351/.324 with seven home runs, 11 doubles, one triple, and 38 RBIs. After the 2020 minor league season was canceled due to the COVID-19 pandemic, Papierski was added to the Astros' alternate training site roster for the Major League season. He spent the 2021 season with the Triple-A Sugar Land Skeeters, hitting .246/.379/.375 with 7 home runs and 46 RBIs. He opened the 2022 season back with Sugar Land.

=== San Francisco Giants ===
On May 14, 2022, the Astros traded Papierski to the San Francisco Giants in exchange for Mauricio Dubón. He was assigned to the Sacramento River Cats. Papierski was promoted to the Giants' major league roster on May 21, 2022. He made his major league debut later that day in 2-1 loss to the San Diego Padres. He went 0-for-9 in his first five major league games. Papierski was designated for assignment on June 18, 2022, after the Giants claimed Yermín Mercedes.

=== Cincinnati Reds ===
On June 25, 2022, Papierski was claimed off waivers by the Cincinnati Reds. He recorded his first major league hit on June 29, against the Chicago Cubs. On August 7, Papierski hit his first career home run, a solo shot off of Milwaukee Brewers starter Corbin Burnes. He appeared in 34 games for Cincinnati, hitting .159/.242/.207 with one home run and 4 RBI.

=== Detroit Tigers ===
On October 14, 2022, he was claimed off waivers by the Detroit Tigers. On November 15, Papierski was designated for assignment by the Tigers. On November 18, he was non–tendered and became a free agent. He re-signed with the Tigers on a minor league contract on November 29.

Papierski spent the 2023 season with the Triple–A Toledo Mud Hens, playing in 77 games and batting .266/.371/.422 with 8 home runs and 51 RBI. He elected free agency following the season on November 6.

=== Seattle Mariners ===
On January 22, 2024, Papierski signed a minor league contract with the Seattle Mariners. He made 83 appearances for the Triple-A Tacoma Rainiers, slashing .242/.358/.372 with six home runs and 46 RBI. Papierski elected free agency following the season on November 4.
