= Sean Hjelle =

American baseball player (born 1997)

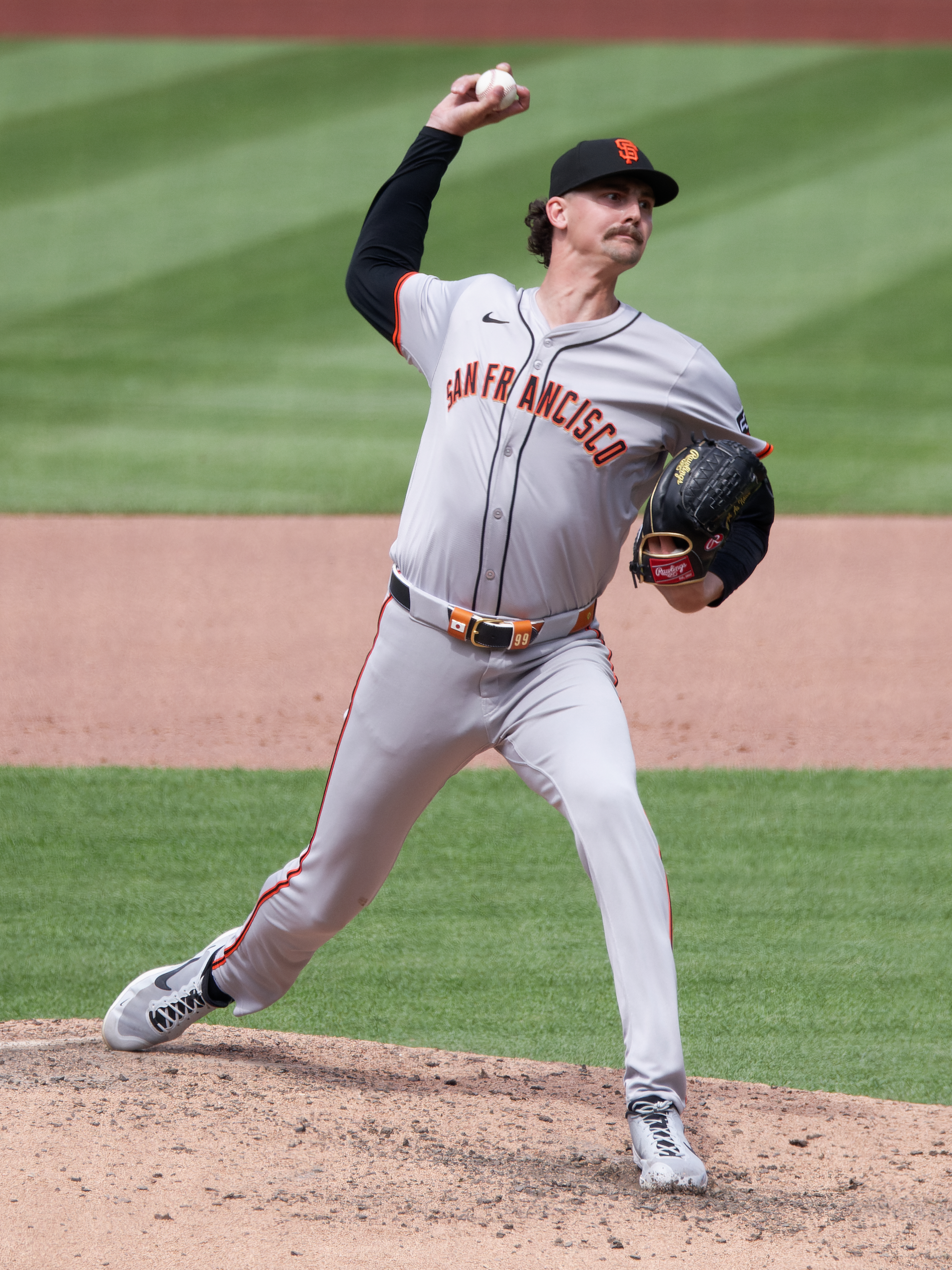
- Hjelle with the Giants in 2024

Orix Buffaloes – No. 69
- Pitcher
- Born: May 7, 1997 (age 29); Fridley, Minnesota, U.S.
- Bats: Right Throws: Right

Professional debut
- MLB: May 6, 2022, for the San Francisco Giants
- NPB: April 5, 2026, for the Orix Buffaloes

MLB statistics (through 2025 season)
- Win–loss record: 7–8
- Earned run average: 5.11
- Strikeouts: 145

NPB statistics (through August 21, 2026)
- Win–loss record: 3-7
- Earned run average: 2.63
- Strikeouts: 77
- Stats at Baseball Reference

Teams
- San Francisco Giants (2022–2025); Orix Buffaloes (2026–present)

Sean Anthony Hjelle (/ˈdʒɛli/ JELLY; born May 7, 1997) is an American professional baseball pitcher for the Orix Buffaloes of Nippon Professional Baseball (NPB). He played college baseball for the University of Kentucky. The San Francisco Giants selected Hjelle in the second round of the 2018 Major League Baseball draft. He is listed at 6 feet 11 inches (2.11 m) tall. Hjelle is tied with former pitcher Jon Rauch as the tallest players in MLB history.

== Amateur career ==
Hjelle attended Mahtomedi High School in Mahtomedi, Minnesota, where he played baseball and basketball. In baseball as a pitcher, he threw a two-seam fastball, a four-seam fastball, a changeup, and a cutter. Hjelle was not drafted out of high school, and enrolled at the University of Kentucky to play college baseball for the Kentucky Wildcats.

In 2017, as a sophomore at Kentucky, Hjelle was named the Southeastern Conference's Pitcher of the Year after going 9–2 with a 3.17 earned run average (ERA) in the regular season, including a 7–1 record and a 1.90 ERA in SEC games. As a junior in 2018, he appeared in 15 games (14 starts), compiling a 7–5 record with a 3.44 ERA.

== Professional career ==
=== San Francisco Giants ===
The San Francisco Giants selected Hjelle in the second round, with the 45th overall selection, of the 2018 MLB draft. He signed for a $1.5 million signing bonus and made his professional debut with the Salem-Keizer Volcanoes. Hjelle spent the whole season with Salem-Keizer, compiling a 5.06 ERA in 12 starts.

Hjelle began the 2019 season with the Augusta GreenJackets of the Single–A South Atlantic League, and was their Opening Day starter. He was promoted to the High–A San Jose Giants in May. In August, the Giants promoted Hjelle to the Richmond Flying Squirrels of the Double–A Eastern League, with whom he finished the year. Over 28 starts between the three clubs, Hjelle went 7–9 with a 3.32 ERA. He did not play in a game in 2020 due to the cancellation of the minor league season because of the COVID-19 pandemic.

In 2021, Hjelle pitched for the Sacramento River Cats of the Triple–A Pacific Coast League. After the season, the Giants added Hjelle to their 40-man roster. He started the 2022 season with Sacramento and made his MLB debut on May 6. On September 28, Hjelle earned his first career win after pitching four innings of one–run ball against the Colorado Rockies in a 6–3 victory.

In 2022 with Sacramento, Hjelle was 6–8 with a 4.92 ERA in 22 starts, in which he pitched 97 innings. With the Giants in 2022 he was 1–2 with a 5.76 ERA in eight relief appearances, covering 25 innings in which he struck out 28 batters.

The Giants optioned Hjelle to Sacramento for the start of the 2023 season. He made 15 appearances out of the bullpen for San Francisco on the year, registering a 2–1 record and 6.52 ERA with 31 strikeouts over 29 innings of work. Hjelle made 58 appearances for the Giants during the 2024 season, compiling a 3–4 record and 3.90 ERA with 75 strikeouts across 80 2/3 innings pitched.

Hjelle was optioned to Triple-A Sacramento to begin the 2025 season. In 12 appearances for San Francisco, he struggled to a 1–1 record and 7.80 ERA with 11 strikeouts over 15 innings of work. On July 30, 2025, Hjelle was designated for assignment by the Giants. He cleared waivers and was sent outright to Triple-A Sacramento on August 3. Hjelle elected free agency following the season on November 6.

=== Orix Buffaloes ===
On January 11, 2026, Hjelle signed with the Orix Buffaloes of Nippon Professional Baseball.

== Personal life ==
Hjelle and his ex-wife Caroline have two children.
