= Yunior Marte =

Yunior Marte may refer to:

- Yunior Marte (baseball, born 1995), a pitcher for the Tohoku Rakuten Golden Eagles
- Yunior Marte (baseball, born 2003), a pitcher for the San Francisco Giants
