= Ford Proctor =

American baseball player (born 1996)

- Catcher / Infielder
- Born: December 4, 1996 (age 29); Beaumont, Texas, U.S.
- Batted: Left Threw: Right

MLB debut
- September 24, 2022, for the San Francisco Giants

Last MLB appearance
- October 5, 2022, for the San Francisco Giants

MLB statistics
- Batting average: .111
- Home runs: 1
- Runs batted in: 6
- Stats at Baseball Reference

Teams
- San Francisco Giants (2022)

Jay Clifford Proctor IV (born December 4, 1996) is an American former professional baseball catcher and infielder. He played college baseball at Rice University, and was drafted by the Tampa Bay Rays in the third round of the 2018 MLB draft. He has previously played in Major League Baseball (MLB) for the San Francisco Giants.

== Amateur career ==
Proctor attended Monsignor Kelly Catholic High School in Beaumont, Texas. He was drafted by the Kansas City Royals in the 40th round of the 2015 Major League Baseball draft, but did not sign.

He played college baseball at Rice University. In 2016 for Rice he batted .336(9th in Conference USA)/.428/.471 in 223 at bats with 3 triples (6th) and 34 walks (7th), while nearly exclusively playing shortstop in the field. In 2017, he played collegiate summer baseball with the Hyannis Harbor Hawks of the Cape Cod Baseball League. In 2017 with Rice he batted .311/.409/.450 in 238 at bats with 58 runs (6th in the conference), 19 doubles (9th), and 39 walks (5th), while grounding into 8 double plays (6th), and playing shortstop. In 2018 with Rice he batted .346(7th in the conference)/.431(10th)/.515 in 237 at bats with 37 walks (7th) and 5 sacrifice flies (5th), and playing shortstop. Proctor was drafted by the Tampa Bay Rays in the third round of the 2018 MLB draft.

== Professional career ==
=== Tampa Bay Rays ===
Proctor made his professional debut with the Hudson Valley Renegades. Over 60 games, he batted .256/.346/.339 with one home run and 24 RBIs, playing 55 games at shortstop and four games at second base.

In 2019, he played for the Bowling Green Hot Rods. He hit .290/.383/.402 in 458 at bats with six home runs, 76 runs (leading the Midwest League), 29 doubles (3rd), 53 RBIs (10th), 69 walks (2nd), 5 sacrifice flies (8th), and 11 stolen bases, while grounding into 12 double plays (5th), over 121 games. He played 57 games at shortstop, 47 games at second base, and 12 games at third base.

In 2020, he played for Eastern Reyes del Tigre of the independent Constellation Energy League. He batted .346/.500/.679 with 18 runs, 9 doubles, 3 triples, 21 RBIs, and 24 walks (leading the league in each category) in 81 at bats.

In 2020–21, he played for the Perth Heat of the Australian Baseball League. He batted .324 (9th in the league)/.452 (1st)/.544 (1st) with 19 runs (5th), 17 RBIs (8th), and 16 walks (3rd) in 68 at bats, playing 9 games at catcher, five games at third base, and 2 games at shortstop.

Proctor spent 2021 with the Montgomery Biscuits. He slashed .244/.381 (8th in the Double-A South)/.419 in 308 at bats with 54 runs (5th), 3 triples (9th), 12 home runs, 63 walks (3rd), and 47 RBIs. He played 58 games at catcher, 28 games at shortstop, 6 games at third base, and 4 games at second base.

On November 19, 2021, the Rays added Proctor to their 40-man roster to protect him from the Rule 5 draft. He began the 2022 season playing for the Triple–A Durham Bulls.

=== San Francisco Giants ===
On August 1, 2022, Proctor was traded to the San Francisco Giants in exchange for pitcher Jeremy Walker. On September 24, Proctor was promoted to the major leagues for the first time following an injury to Luis González. The following day, Proctor collected his first career hit, a single off of Kevin Ginkel of the Arizona Diamondbacks. On September 29, Proctor hit his first career home run, a grand slam off of Ryan Feltner of the Colorado Rockies.

In 2022 with the Triple-A Sacramento River Cats, he batted .267/.390/.448 in 116 at bats, with 19 runs, six home runs, and 14 RBI. He played 16 games at third base, 8 at second base, 4 each at shortstop and catcher, 3 at DH, and one at first base. With the Giants, he batted 2-for-18 with a home run and six RBIs. He was sent outright off the 40-man roster on November 9, 2022.

Proctor began the 2023 season back with Triple–A Sacramento. In 74 games, he hit .230/.358/.335 with 6 home runs and 29 RBI. On July 24, 2023, Proctor was released by the Giants organization.
