= Constellation Energy League =

American professional baseball league during 2020

- Classification: Independent
- Sport: Baseball
- Founded: 2020
- Ceased: 2020
- No. of teams: 4
- Country: United States
- Headquarters: Sugar Land, Texas
- Venue(s): Constellation Field
- Last champion(s): Sugar Land Skeeters (Note: Baseball reference sites, which appear to account for tie games differently, list Eastern Reyes del Tigre atop league standings.)

The Constellation Energy League was an independent baseball league that operated in Texas during 2020 because of COVID-19 restrictions limiting travel, and as a way to create opportunities for minor league players.

== History ==
The league consisted of four teams, each managed by a former Major League Baseball (MLB) player:

Team	Manager	Roster
Eastern Reyes del Tigre	Dave Eiland	link
Sugar Land Lightning Sloths	Greg Swindell	link
Sugar Land Skeeters (Note: "The 2020 team does not necessarily reflect the 2019 Atlantic League roster that played under the same title.")	Pete Incaviglia	link
Team Texas	Roger Clemens and son Koby Clemens	link

The teams were made up of former MLB players as well as other minor league and independent professional players. Each team was scheduled to play 28 games, including seven-inning doubleheaders every weekend. The league's season was planned to begin on July 3, but was pushed back to July 10 due to a spike in COVID-19 cases. Even with the delay, the league began play two weeks before the start of the 2020 MLB season.

All games were played at Constellation Field in Sugar Land, Texas. Parking was included with ticket prices to limit staff and fan interactions and up to 1800 ticket-holders were seated in a socially distanced fashion within the 7500-seat stadium. No games were canceled due to COVID-19 cases, and the league operated for five weeks without any positive COVID-19 test results. Players received $1600 per month, with exposure to MLB teams being the main reason for playing; at least five players in the league were subsequently added to MLB rosters.

=== Results and honors ===
The Sugar Land Skeeters finished with the best record in the four-team league. A most-valuable player (MVP) was named for each team.

Team	Record	Win pct.	MVP (statistics)
Sugar Land Skeeters	17–11	.607	Dustin Peterson (.309/.400/.500 slash line)
Eastern Reyes Del Tigre	14–14	.500	Ford Proctor (.346/.500/.679 slash line)
Sugar Land Lightning Sloths	14–14	.500	Jamie Westbrook (18 RBIs, 5 home runs)
Team Texas	11–17	.393	Kody Clemens (.416 slugging percentage)

An all-star team was also named:

Pos.	Player	Team
C	Jake Romanski	Sugar Land Skeeters
1B	Casey Gillaspie	Eastern Reyes Del Tigre
2B	Dustin Peterson	Sugar Land Skeeters
SS	Ford Proctor	Eastern Reyes Del Tigre
3B	Ryder Jones	Sugar Land Skeeters
OF	Courtney Hawkins	Sugar Land Skeeters
OF	Evan Marzilli	Eastern Reyes Del Tigre
OF	Jamie Westbrook	Sugar Land Lightning Sloths
DH	Jared Walker	Eastern Reyes Del Tigre
UTIL	Kody Clemens	Team Texas
UTIL	David Hamilton	Team Texas

Pos.	Player	Team
SP	Matt Dermody	Sugar Land Skeeters
SP	Anthony Vasquez	Eastern Reyes Del Tigre
SP	Joe Wieland	Sugar Land Lightning Sloths
RP	Alejandro Mateo	Team Texas
RP	Zac Rosscup	Sugar Land Lightning Sloths
RP	Robby Scott	Sugar Land Skeeters
