= Willie Calhoun =

American baseball player (born 1994)

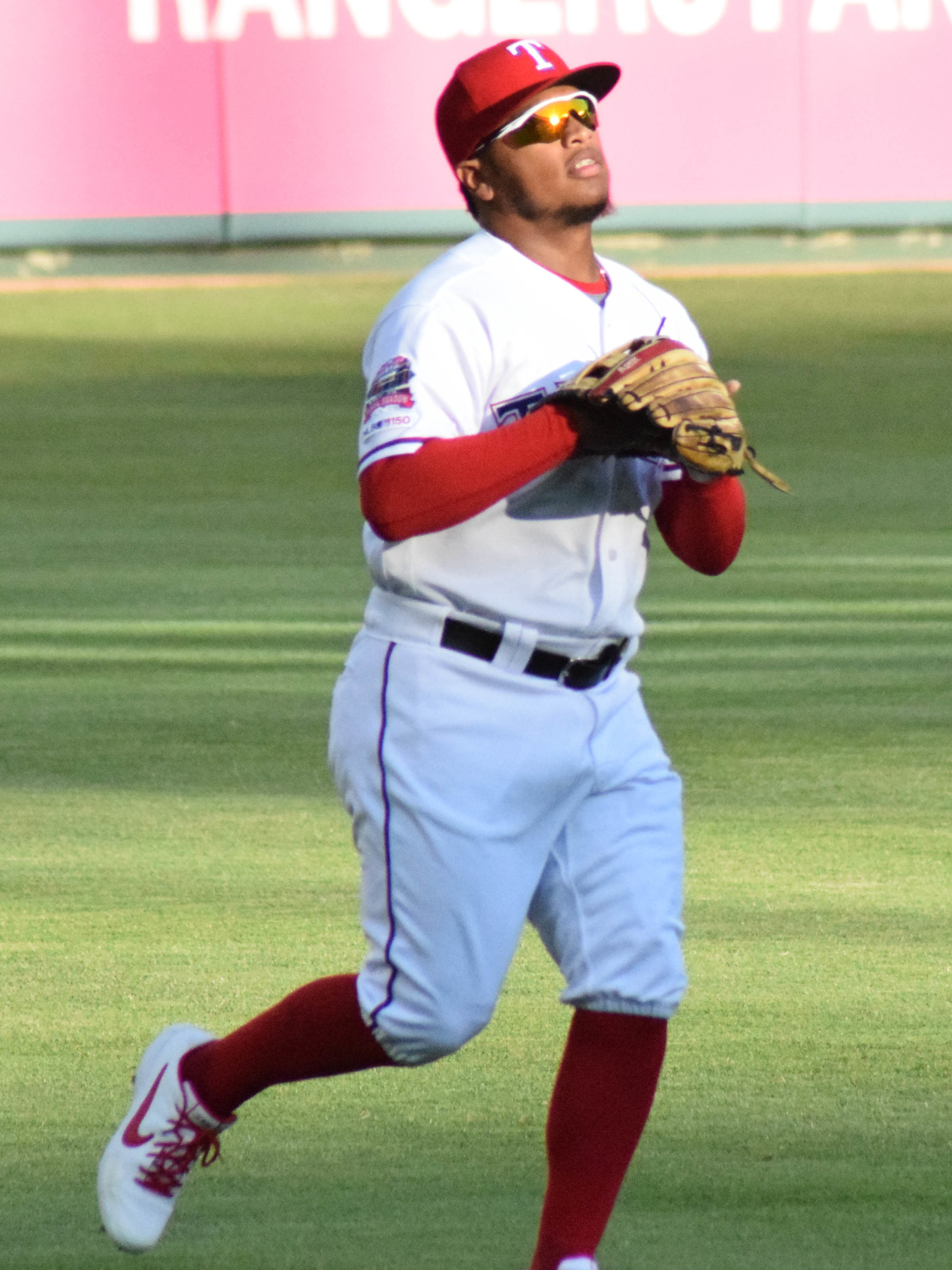
- Calhoun at Globe Life Park in Arlington in 2019

Charros de Jalisco – No. 5
- Left fielder / Designated hitter
- Born: November 4, 1994 (age 32); Vallejo, California, U.S.
- Bats: Left Throws: Right

MLB debut
- September 12, 2017, for the Texas Rangers

MLB statistics (through 2024 season)
- Batting average: .245
- Home runs: 39
- Runs batted in: 132
- Stats at Baseball Reference

Teams
- Texas Rangers (2017–2022); San Francisco Giants (2022); New York Yankees (2023); Los Angeles Angels (2024)

Willie Shawn Lamont Calhoun (born November 4, 1994) is an American professional baseball left fielder and designated hitter for the Charros de Jalisco of the Mexican League. He has previously played in Major League Baseball (MLB) for the Texas Rangers, San Francisco Giants, New York Yankees, and Los Angeles Angels.

Calhoun played college baseball at the University of Arizona and Yavapai College. The Los Angeles Dodgers selected Calhoun in the fourth round of the 2015 MLB draft. He made his MLB debut with the Rangers in 2017, and played with them until 2022, when he was traded to the Giants.

== Early life ==
Calhoun is named after his father, a corrections officer at San Quentin State Prison. His mother is Monica. He has a younger sister and a younger brother.

== High school ==
Calhoun attended Benicia High School in Benicia, California, where in three years of baseball as an infielder he batted .435/.513/.736 with 11 home runs and 82 runs batted in (RBIs) in 262 at bats. He was named 2012 and 2013 Sac Joaquin All-Section, named a top-150 national prospect by Perfect Game, 2013 third team Rawlings/Perfect Game Preseason All-America, Rawlings/Perfect Game California Region First Team, Solano County Athletic Conference co-MVP, and to the New Balance All-Area Code team.

The Tampa Bay Rays selected him in the 17th round of the 2013 Major League Baseball draft, but he did not sign with the Rays. Instead, Calhoun honored his commitment to play college baseball for the Arizona Wildcats.

== College career ==
Calhoun struggled in his lone season at the University of Arizona, batted .247/.345/.301 in 146 at-bats playing third base, lost his spot on the team, and considered quitting the sport altogether. In 2014, he played collegiate summer baseball with the Wareham Gatemen of the Cape Cod Baseball League.

In 2015, he transferred to Yavapai College, a community college. With them, he batted .432/.520/.952 with 31 home runs and 85 RBIs in 227 at bats. His 31 home runs were the most by a junior college player since Bryce Harper also hit 31, at the College of Southern Nevada in 2010. Calhoun signed with Kansas State University out of junior college.

== Professional career ==
=== Los Angeles Dodgers ===
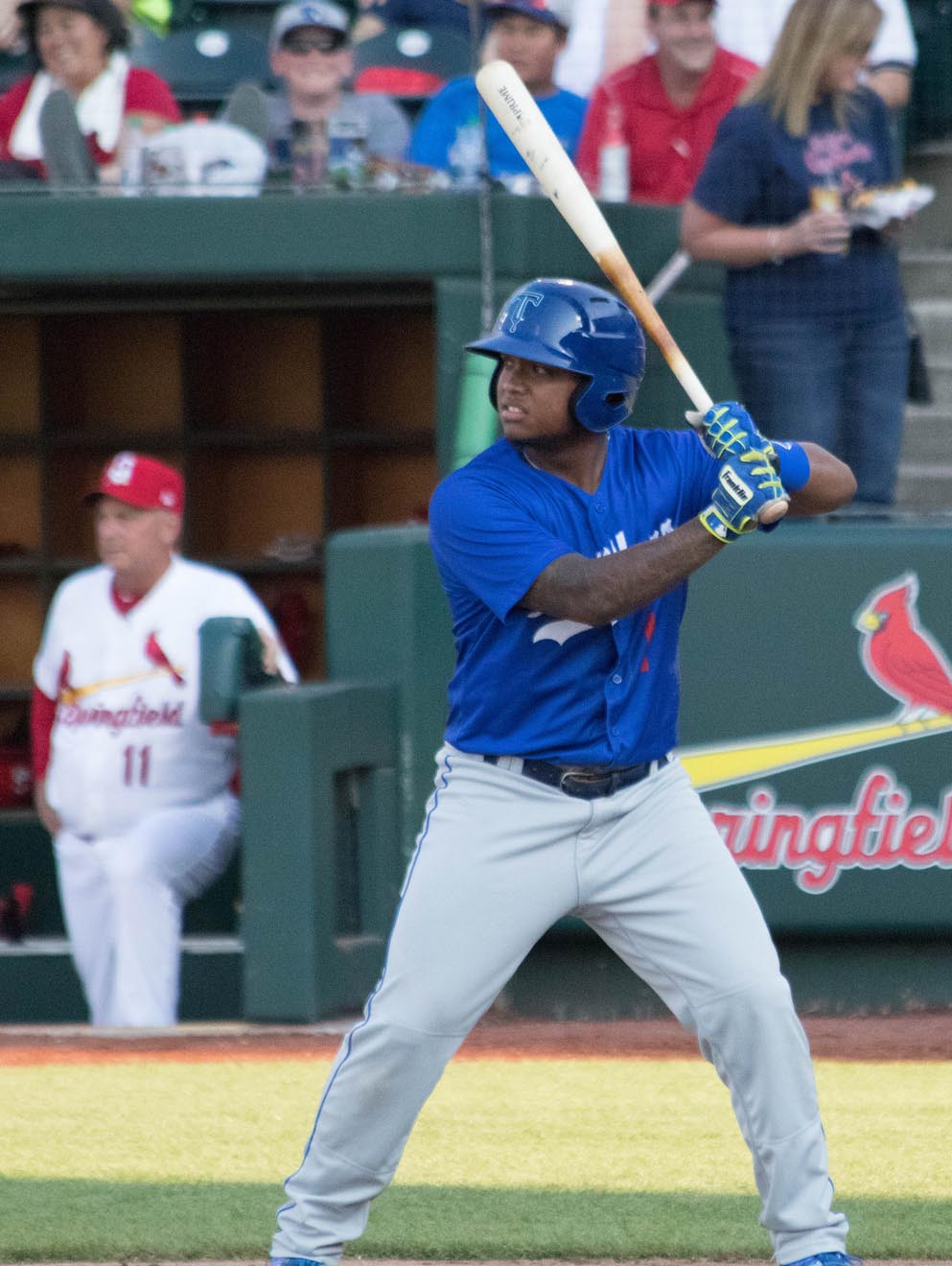
Calhoun with the Tulsa Drillers in 2016.

The Los Angeles Dodgers selected Calhoun in the fourth round of the 2015 MLB draft. He signed with the Dodgers for a signing bonus above $340,000, rather than transfer to Kansas State, and made his professional debut with the Ogden Raptors (with whom he was a Pioneer League mid-season All Star) and was later promoted to the Great Lakes Loons and Rancho Cucamonga Quakes. In 73 games between the three levels, he hit .316/.390/.519 with 11 home runs and 47 RBIs, as he played second base.

To start the 2016 season, Calhoun was promoted to the Double-A Tulsa Drillers of the Texas League. He was selected as a starter for the mid-season Texas League All-Star game, and was also named a Texas League post-season All Star, and selected to the U.S. team for the All-Star Futures Game. In 503 at bats over 132 games for the Drillers, he hit .255/.318/.469 with 75 runs (2nd in the Texas League), 27 homers (2nd), 45 walks (8th), and 88 RBIs (1st). At the conclusion of the season, he was also named to the post-season all-star team, and an MiLB.com Organizational All-Star. After the season, the Dodgers assigned Calhoun to the Glendale Desert Dogs of the Arizona Fall League. He earned MVP honors in the Fall Stars Game for top prospects playing in the league when he went 3-for-3 with a homer in the game.

Calhoun was promoted to the Triple-A Oklahoma City Dodgers to begin the 2017 season and played well enough to be named the second baseman for the Pacific Coast League mid-season and post-season all-star teams. In 2017 with the team he batted .298/.358/.574.

=== Texas Rangers ===
==== 2017–18 ====
On July 31, 2017, the Dodgers traded Calhoun, A. J. Alexy, and Brendon Davis to the Texas Rangers for Yu Darvish. With the Triple-A Round Rock Express he batted .310/.345/.566. Between the two teams in the Pacific Coast League (PCL), where he entered the season as the 9th-youngest player. Calhoun batted .300/.355/.572 with 80 runs (7th in the league), 31 home runs (2nd), and 93 RBIs (2nd) in 486 at bats, and was the 9th-toughest batter to strike out, averaging a strikeout every 8.0 at bats. He was named to the PCL Postseason All-Star Team, the Yahoo! Sports All-Minor League Team, and Baseball America's Minor League All-Star Second Team.

The Rangers promoted Calhoun to the major leagues for the first time on September 12, 2017. Calhoun hit .265/.324/.353 with a home run and four RBIs for the Rangers in 13 games in 2017, playing 11 games in left field, one at DH, and one as a pinch hitter. Going into the 2018 season, he was rated the No. 36 prospect in baseball by Baseball America, No. 43 by Baseball Prospectus, and No. 53 by Major League Baseball. In 2018, Calhoun hit .222/.269/.333 with two home runs and 11 RBIs in 35 major league games, playing 26 games in left field, nine as a pinch hitter, and one as a DH. In 108 games with Round Rock, he hit .294/.351/.431 with nine home runs and 47 RBIs.

==== 2019 ====
Calhoun came to 2019 spring training having lost 25 pounds (11 kg). The Rangers optioned Calhoun to the Triple-A Nashville Sounds to open the season. On May 15, he was recalled to replace the injured Elvis Andrus, making his season debut the same day. In the midst of batting .435/.458/.739, he was placed on the 10-day IL on May 22 with a strained left quadriceps. He was reactivated from the IL on June 17, but was optioned back to Triple-A Nashville on July 16 after hitting .225/.267/.408 in a second stint in order to clear a spot for All-Star OF/DH Hunter Pence on the roster. On July 25, he was recalled to replace the injured Joey Gallo, and he played with the Rangers for the remainder of the season.

Calhoun finished the 2019 MLB season batting .269/.323/.524 with 51 runs, 21 home runs, and 48 RBIs in 83 games. He played 71 games in left field, seven games at DH, and five games as a pinch hitter.

==== 2020 ====
On March 8, 2020, during a spring training game against the Los Angeles Dodgers, Calhoun was struck on the right side of his face by a 95-mile-per-hour (153 km/h) fastball by lefthander Julio Urías. The impact fractured and displaced Calhoun's jaw, and he was air-lifted by helicopter to a hospital. Calhoun had worn a face shield on his batting helmet previously, but stopped during the prior season. He underwent surgery for a non-displaced fracture in his jaw to insert a plate and stabilize his jaw the next day.

In 100 at bats over 29 games in the 2020 season, Calhoun hit .190/.232/.260 with one home run and 13 RBIs. His .491 OPS was 2nd-lowest in MLB (min. 100 AB). He played 21 games at DH, six games in left field, and three games as a pinch hitter.

==== 2021 ====
On June 26, 2021, Calhoun suffered a fractured forearm after he was hit by a pitch from Kansas City Royals left-handed pitcher Kris Bubic. He underwent surgery to repair a fracture in his left ulna, and was placed on the injured list.

Calhoun finished the 2021 season hitting .250/.310/.381 with six home runs and 25 RBIs over 284 at bats in 75 games played, playing left field. He played 40 games as a left fielder, 29 games as a DH, and seven games as a pinch hitter. He was one of only 11 major leaguers listed at 5 foot 8 or shorter who were playing regularly.

==== 2022 ====
On March 22, 2022, Calhoun signed a $1.3 million contract with the Rangers, avoiding salary arbitration. After he began the 2022 season with a .136 batting average in 44 at bats, as he played 12 games as a DH, five games in left field, and five games as a pinch hitter, the Rangers optioned Calhoun to Round Rock. In response, Calhoun requested a trade from the Rangers. On June 5, Calhoun was designated for assignment. Calhoun went unclaimed on waivers and accepted an outright assignment to Round Rock. With Round Rock he batted .217/.264/.410 with 5 home runs and 20 RBIs in 83 at bats, playing 12 games in left field and 9 games at DH.

=== San Francisco Giants ===
On June 23, 2022, the Rangers traded Calhoun and cash considerations to the San Francisco Giants for outfielder Steven Duggar. He played for the Sacramento River Cats of the PCL. The Giants promoted Calhoun to the major leagues on September 12. After he played in four games for the Giants, Calhoun was designated for assignment on September 18. He cleared waivers and was sent outright to Triple–A Sacramento on September 20. On October 12, Calhoun elected free agency.

=== New York Yankees ===
On December 31, 2022, Calhoun signed a minor league contract with the New York Yankees organization. After competing for a spot on the Yankees roster in spring training, he was assigned to the Triple-A Scranton/Wilkes-Barre RailRiders to begin the 2023 season. On April 8, 2023, Calhoun was selected to the active roster. In 44 games, he batted .239/.309/.403 with 5 home runs and 16 RBI. Calhoun spent a month on the injured list with a left quad strain after his initial placement on June 22. After completing a rehab assignment with the Double–A Somerset Patriots, he was designated for assignment upon being activated on July 28. Calhoun elected free agency on August 1.

=== Los Angeles Angels ===
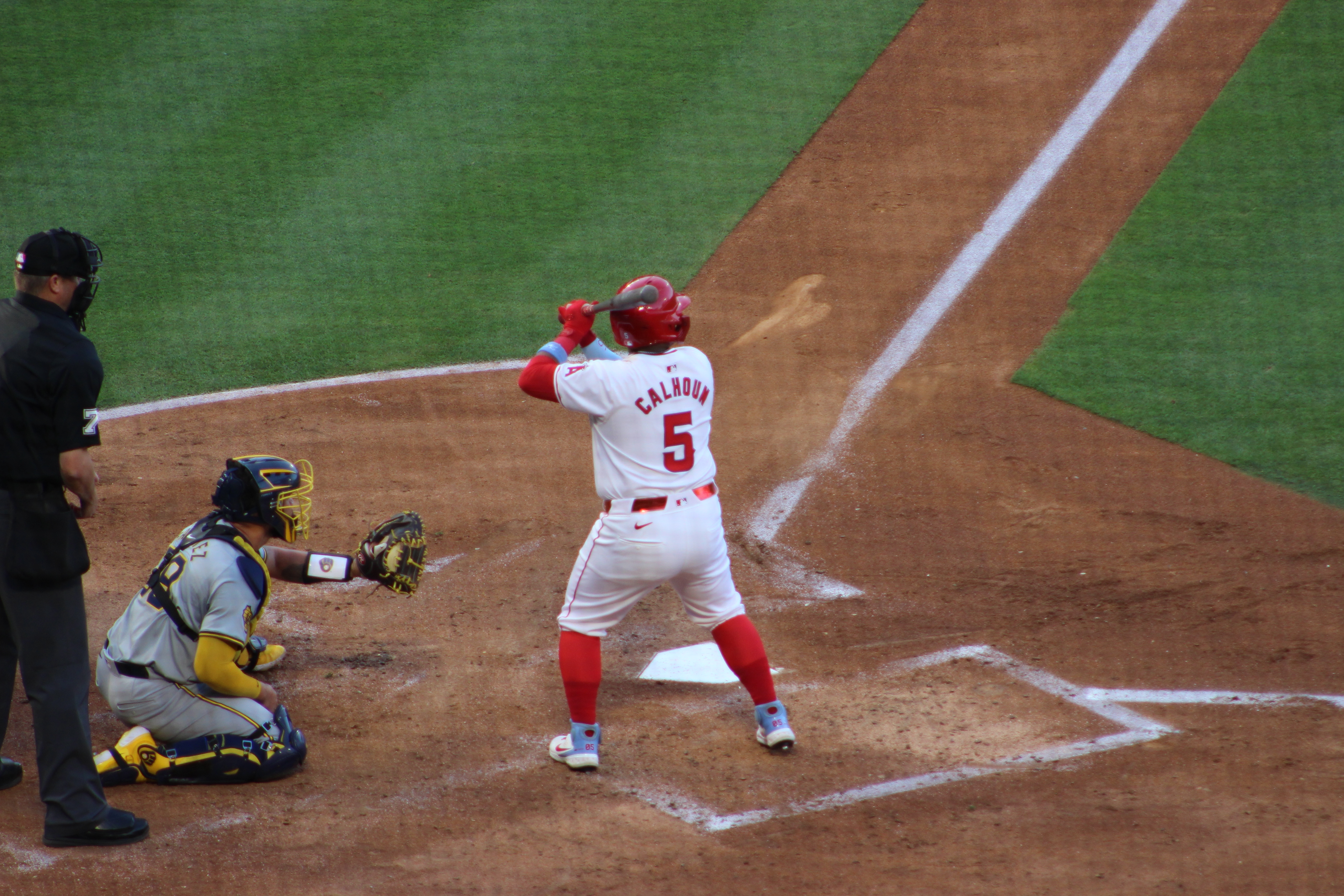
Calhoun in 2024

On December 6, 2023, Calhoun signed a minor league contract with the Los Angeles Angels organization. In 26 games for the Triple–A Salt Lake Bees, he batted .268/.346/.361 with one home run and 12 RBI. On May 1, 2024, the Angels selected Calhoun's contract, adding him to the major league roster. In 68 games for the Angels, primarily as a designated hitter, he slashed .245/.315/.380 with five home runs and 20 RBI. Calhoun was designated for assignment by Los Angeles on August 16. He cleared waivers and was sent outright to Salt Lake the next day. Calhoun elected free agency on October 1.

=== Tigres de Quintana Roo ===
On March 4, 2025, Calhoun signed with the Tigres de Quintana Roo of the Mexican League. In 73 appearances for Quintana Roo, he batted .278/.357/.463 with 12 home runs, 47 RBI, and four stolen bases. Calhoun was released by the Tigres on July 24.

=== Charros de Jalisco ===
On July 28, 2025, Calhoun signed with the Charros de Jalisco of the Mexican League. He made nine appearances for Jalisco, batting .243/.333/.486 with two home runs and 19 RBI.
