= Cole Waites =

American baseball player (born 1998)

Free agent
- Pitcher
- Born: June 10, 1998 (age 28); Lawrenceville, Georgia, U.S.
- Bats: Right Throws: Right

MLB debut
- September 13, 2022, for the San Francisco Giants

MLB statistics (through 2023 season)
- Win–loss record: 0–0
- Earned run average: 6.75
- Strikeouts: 6
- Stats at Baseball Reference

Teams
- San Francisco Giants (2022–2023)

Cole Robert Waites (born June 10, 1998) is an American professional baseball pitcher who is a free agent. He played college baseball at the University of West Alabama, and was drafted by the San Francisco Giants in the 18th round of the 2019 MLB draft. He made his Major League Baseball (MLB) debut in 2022.

== Amateur career ==
Waites attended Archer High School in Lawrenceville, Georgia. He played college baseball, primarily as a starter, at the University of West Alabama, where his 118 strikeouts as a junior led the Gulf South Conference.

In 2018, Waites played collegiate summer baseball for the Wisconsin Rapids Rafters of the Northwoods League.

Waites was drafted by the San Francisco Giants in the 18th round of the 2019 Major League Baseball draft, and signed for a signing bonus of $100,000.

== Professional career ==
=== San Francisco Giants ===
==== 2019–21 ====
Waites made his professional debut in 2019 with the rookie-level Arizona League Giants. He did not play in a game in 2020 due to the cancellation of the minor league season because of the COVID-19 pandemic.

Waites returned in 2021 after missing most of the season recovering from knee surgery for torn meniscus to pitch for the Arizona Complex League Giants and San Jose Giants. In 2021 as a reliever he was a combined 2-0 with two saves and an 0.68 ERA, as in 13 1/3 innings he gave up one hit and struck out 31 batters. After the season, he pitched in the Arizona Fall League.

==== 2022 ====
Waites started 2022 with the Eugene Emeralds. He was then promoted to the Richmond Flying Squirrels and Sacramento River Cats, pitching out of the bullpen.

On September 12, 2022, the Giants selected Waites' contract and promoted him to the major leagues.

Between the three minor league affiliates in 2022 he was 4-3 with a 1.94 ERA as in 41 2/3 innings he gave up 25 hits and had 76 strikeouts. In his minor league career through his 2022 call-up, in 71 1/3 innings he had a 45.1% strikeout rate (averaging 16.9 strikeouts per 9 innings) and 2.78 ERA, with a 13.8% walk rate.

In 2022 with the Giants he was 0-0 with a 3.18 ERA in seven relief appearances, in which he pitched 5 2/3 innings.

==== 2023–25 ====
Waites was optioned to Triple-A Sacramento to begin the 2023 season. On July 18, 2023, he was placed on the 60-day injured list with a right elbow sprain. On September 13, Waites was ruled out for 12–to–15 months after undergoing Tommy John surgery to repair his ulnar collateral ligament. The procedure ended his 2023 season, and ruled him out for the entirety of the 2024 season as well. In 3 appearances for the Giants in 2023, he struggled to a 15.43 ERA with 2 strikeouts in 2 1/3 innings of work. He was non-tendered and became a free agent on November 17.

On November 26, 2023, Waites re–signed with the Giants organization on a minor league contract. He returned to action in 2025, making five scoreless appearances for the ACL Giants and Sacramento. Waites elected free agency following the season on November 6, 2025.

=== Detroit Tigers ===
On December 16, 2025, Waites signed a minor league contract with the Detroit Tigers. In 13 games across three levels of the minors he threw 13.1 innings of relief going 0-2 with a 5.40 ERA with the same amount of walks as strikeouts with 12. He was released on June 30.

== Pitching style ==
Waites relies primarily on a mid-90s fastball that has reached 100 mph, and an above-average slider.
