= Steven Duggar =

American baseball player (born 1993)

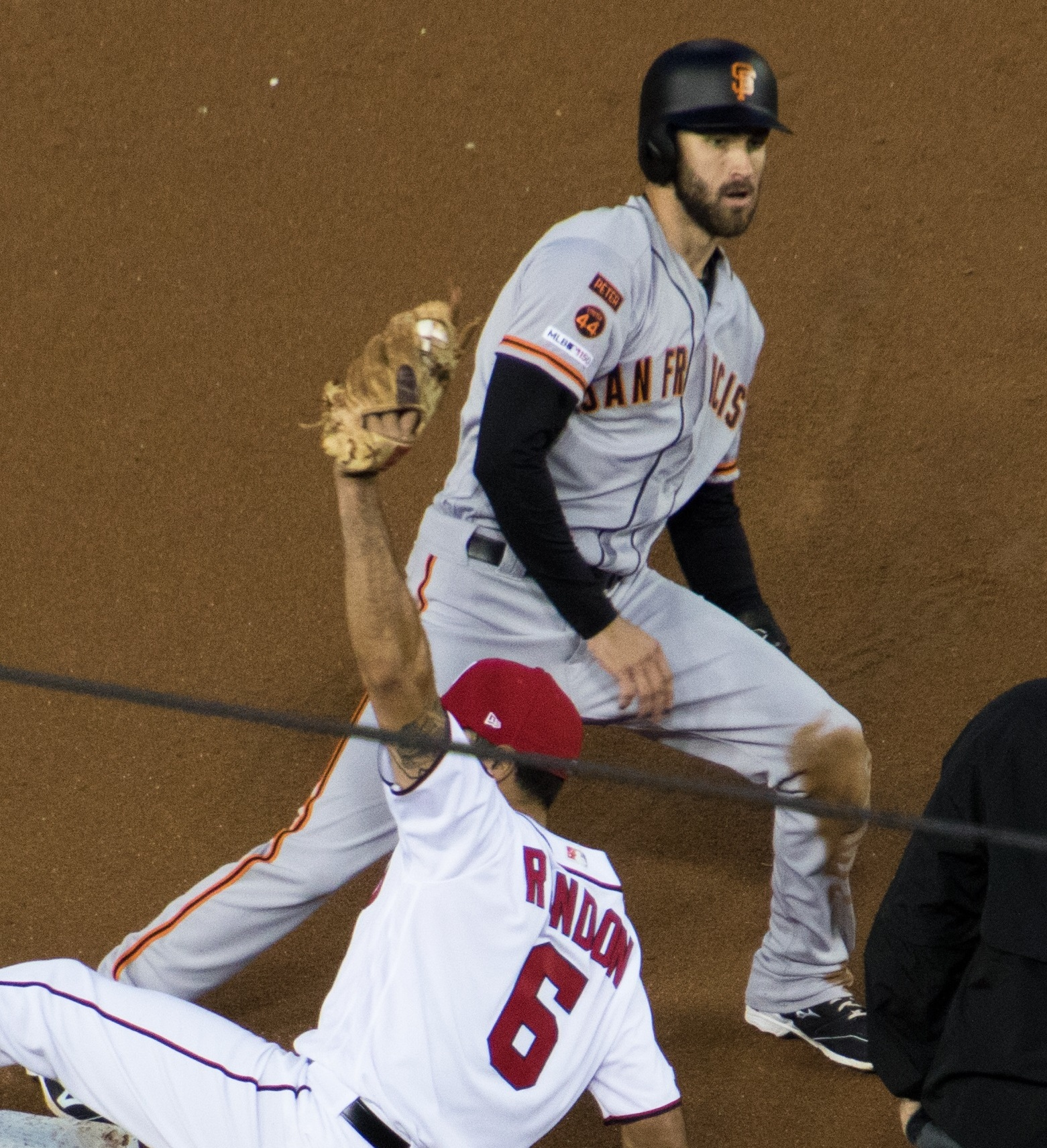
- Duggar at Nationals Park in April 2019
- Outfielder
- Born: November 4, 1993 (age 33); Spartanburg, South Carolina, U.S.
- Batted: Left Threw: Right

MLB debut
- July 8, 2018, for the San Francisco Giants

Last MLB appearance
- August 17, 2022, for the Los Angeles Angels

MLB statistics
- Batting average: .236
- Home runs: 14
- Runs batted in: 87
- Stats at Baseball Reference

Teams
- San Francisco Giants (2018–2022); Texas Rangers (2022); Los Angeles Angels (2022)

Steven Michael Duggar (born November 4, 1993), nicknamed Duggy, is an American former professional baseball outfielder. He played in Major League Baseball (MLB) for the San Francisco Giants, Texas Rangers, and Los Angeles Angels. Duggar played college baseball at Clemson University, and was drafted in the sixth round of the 2015 MLB draft by the Giants, for whom he made his MLB debut with in 2018.

== Early life ==
Duggar was born in Spartanburg, South Carolina, and raised in Moore, South Carolina. His mother was a swimmer at the University of Evansville. When he was 10 years old, his father died.

== Amateur career ==
Duggar attended James F. Byrnes High School in Duncan, South Carolina; he first began playing for the varsity when he was a seventh grader. He was all-region as a sophomore, junior, and senior, and all-state as a junior and senior.

He then played college baseball at Clemson University, playing right field primarily. In 2013, Duggar played collegiate summer baseball with the Cotuit Kettleers of the Cape Cod Baseball League, and he returned to the league in 2014 to play for the Falmouth Commodores and was named a league all-star. In 2014 with Clemson, he batted 294/.368/.378, was 2nd in the Atlantic Coast Conference with 25 stolen bases (while being caught only three times), and tied for 7th with 3 triples. In 2015 he batted .304/.432/.432, and led the ACC in sacrifice flies (8), was 3rd in walks (54), and was 7th in runs (56).

== Professional career ==
=== San Francisco Giants ===
==== 2015-17 ====
After his junior year at Clemson, the San Francisco Giants selected Duggar in the sixth round of the 2015 Major League Baseball draft, and he signed for a signing bonus of $248,800. Duggar made his professional debut with the Salem-Keizer Volcanoes. He spent the whole 2015 season there, batting .293/.390(9th in the Northwest League)/.367 with one home run and 27 RBIs, and was 7th in the league with 35 walks, in 229 at bats over 58 games.

He started 2016 with the San Jose Giants, and after batting .284/.386/.462 with nine home runs and 30 RBIs in 264 at bats was promoted to the Richmond Flying Squirrels in June, where Duggar played exclusively center field and finished the season, batting .321(8th in the Eastern League)/.391(10th)/.432 with one home run, 24 RBIs, and an .823 OPS in 243 at bats. He had 13 assists from the outfield in 124 games, between the two teams. He was named to the MiLB Giants organization All Star team.

Duggar's 2017 season was limited due to injuries; a right flexor strain in his elbow and a left hamstring strain. He played only 44 total games between the AZL Giants, San Jose, and the Sacramento River Cats, batting a combined .262/.365/.445 with six home runs and 26 RBIs and 10 stolen bases (in 12 attempts) in 164 at bats between the three teams. He was named to the 2017 Arizona Fall League All-Prospect Team, playing with the Scottsdale Scorpions.

==== 2018-19 ====
Duggar was called up to the majors for the first time on July 8, 2018, and made his major league debut batting leadoff. In 141 at bats for the Giants he batted .255/.303/.390 with two home runs and 17 RBI while playing center field. In Triple–A with Sacramento, he played center field and batted .272/.354/.421 in 316 at bats. His season ended in late August when he tore the labrum in his left shoulder.

In 2019 for the Giants, in 261 at bats Duggar hit .234/.278/.341 with 24 runs, four home runs, and 28 RBI in 261 at bats, splitting time on defense between center field and right field. In Triple–A with Sacramento, he played center field and batted .337/.461/.542 with 24 runs, three home runs, and 13 RBI in 83 at bats. His season ended in early August with a sprained left shoulder.

==== 2020–22 ====
In 2020, Duggar played in only 21 games. He had 34 at bats, hitting .176 with 3 runs, 3 RBI, and one steal in one attempt. On May 20, 2021, Duggar hit his first career grand slam, off of Michael Feliz of the Cincinnati Reds.

In the 2021 regular season with the Giants, Duggar batted .257/.330/.437 with 5 triples (6th in the National League), 8 home runs, and 35 RBI in 268 at bats, and stole seven bases in seven attempts. He primarily played center field, with stints in left field and right field. For Triple–A Sacramento, he batted .279/.371/.393 with 13 runs, one home run, 9 RBI, and 8 steals in 8 attempts, in 61 at bats.

Duggar opened the 2022 season as the primary center fielder for the Giants. He injured his side while swinging on April 21, and left the game in the middle of his at bat. He was placed on the 60-day injured list the next day with an oblique strain. Duggar was hitting .194/.231/.278 with four steals in four attempts in 36 at bats in 12 games at the time of his injury. He began a rehab assignment with the Triple-A Sacramento River Cats on June 2, and had reached the 20-day maximum of his rehab assignment at the time of his trade away from the organization. With Sacramento, he batted .204/.264/.286 with two steals in two attempts in 49 at bats.

=== Texas Rangers ===
On June 23, 2022, the Giants traded Duggar to the Texas Rangers for outfielder Willie Calhoun and cash considerations. Duggar was immediately activated off of the 60-day IL to the 26-man roster following the trade. In a 16-game stint on the active roster, Duggar made just four starts, and went 3–for–17 (.176) with 12 strikeouts. He was optioned to the Triple-A Round Rock Express on July 14. On August 4, Duggar was designated for assignment.

=== Los Angeles Angels ===
On August 7, 2022, Duggar was claimed off waivers by the Los Angeles Angels. In nine games for the Angels, he went 1–for–19 (.035). On September 1, Duggar was designated for assignment following the promotion of Ryan Aguilar. He elected free agency after clearing waivers on September 4.

=== Los Angeles Dodgers ===
On December 17, 2022, Duggar signed a minor league contract with the Los Angeles Dodgers. He played in 69 games for the Triple-A Oklahoma City Dodgers during the 2023 campaign, batting .242 with nine homers and 38 RBI. Dugger elected free agency following the season on November 6, 2023.

Duggar retired from professional baseball following the 2023 season and began coaching youth players in his hometown.
