= Luis González (outfielder, born 1995) =

Mexican baseball player (born 1995)

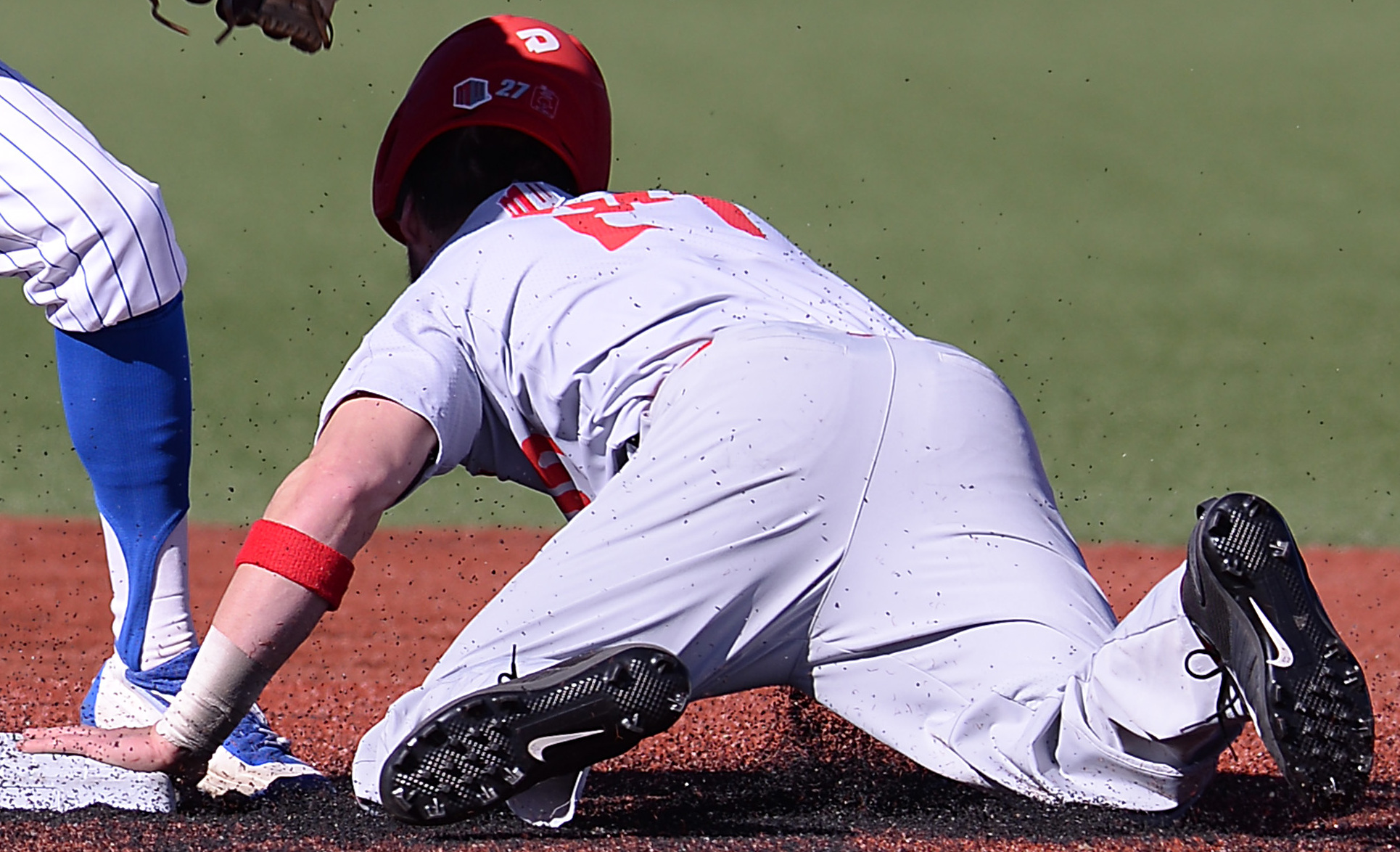
- González with New Mexico in 2017

Olmecas de Tabasco – No. 10
- Outfielder
- Born: September 10, 1995 (age 31); Hermosillo, Mexico
- Bats: Left Throws: Left

MLB debut
- August 18, 2020, for the Chicago White Sox

MLB statistics (through 2022 season)
- Batting average: .253
- Home runs: 4
- Runs batted in: 36
- Stats at Baseball Reference

Teams
- Chicago White Sox (2020–2021); San Francisco Giants (2022)

Luis Fernando González (born September 10, 1995) is a Mexican professional baseball outfielder for the Olmecas de Tabasco of the Mexican League. He played college baseball at the University of New Mexico. He was drafted by the Chicago White Sox in the third round of the 2017 Major League Baseball draft, and made his MLB debut with them in 2020. He has also played in Major League Baseball (MLB) for the San Francisco Giants.

== Early life ==
González was born in Hermosillo, Sonora, Mexico, to Luis and Lisa González, and has an older sibling named Paloma. He started playing baseball when he was six years old, in the local Liga Unison (Unison League), a youth baseball league sponsored by the University of Sonora in Hermosillo. He is bilingual and moved to Arizona with his family when he was 10 years old.

== Amateur career ==
González attended Catalina Foothills High School in Tucson, Arizona. He batted .400 for Foothills with a 9-4 pitching record, and was named a Division 2 MVP in his senior year when he batted .500 with 10 home runs.

Gonzalez then enrolled at the University of New Mexico, where Gonzalez played college baseball for the New Mexico Lobos as a center fielder and a weekend starting pitcher for three years (2015–17). As a sophomore in 2016, González had a .381 batting average (4th in the Mountain West Conference), 21 doubles (3rd), five triples (4th), six home runs (8th), 63 runs (2nd), 43 walks (2nd), a .470 on-base percentage (3rd), a .694 slugging percentage (6th), and 18 stolen bases (2nd) without being caught, and was named to the Second-Team All-Mountain West. González was also named co-MVP of the 2016 Mountain West Conference tournament after going 3-for-5 in the Championship game. The win qualified the Lobos for the 2016 NCAA Regionals. While the Lobos lost to #1 seed Texas Tech before being eliminated by Dallas Baptist the following morning, González had three hits against Texas Tech, with one article saying: "If there's a bright side for the Lobos, it's that center fielder Luis Gonzalez might be the hottest hitter in the entire regional." As a junior in 2017, he slashed .361/.500/.589 with 62 runs (4th), 22 doubles (4th), 14 stolen bases (4th) in 18 attempts, and 58 walks (leading the conference). For his New Mexico career, he batted .353/.468/.564 in 598 at bats, had 153 runs, 54 doubles, 8 triples, 18 home runs, and 113 RBIs, stole 35 bases while being caught five times, walked 124 times but only struck out 71 times, and made 22 starts as a pitcher.

== Professional career ==
=== Chicago White Sox ===
The Chicago White Sox selected Gonzalez in the third round of the 2017 Major League Baseball draft. He signed in June 2017 for a $517,000 signing bonus.

González spent his first professional season in 2017 with the Rookie League Great Falls Voyagers and the Single–A Kannapolis Intimidators. He batted .236/.351/.348 with 29 runs, two home runs and 15 RBIs in 250 at bats over 67 games.

He played 2018 with Kannapolis and the High–A Winston-Salem Dash, slashing a combined .307/.368/.498 in 482 at bats with 85 runs, 40 doubles (the most in the organization, and 4th-most in the minor leagues), 14 home runs, and 71 RBIs (3rd among White Sox minor leaguers) in 117 games between the two clubs. He was named a 2018 South Atlantic League Mid-Season All Star, and a 2018 MiLB Organization All Star.

He spent 2019 with the Double–A Birmingham Barons. González slashed .247/.316/.359 with 63 runs (4th in the Southern League), nine home runs, 59 RBIs (10th), 10 sacrifice flies (leading the league), and 17 stolen bases and 9 caught stealing in 473 at bats over 126 games.

On August 17, 2020, González was promoted to the major leagues for the first time. On August 18, he made his MLB debut, and in the season he had two plate appearances.

In 2021, he batted .241/.352/.423 in 137 at bats for the Triple–A Charlotte Knights, and hit two doubles in eight at bats for the White Sox. On August 9, 2021, González was released by the White Sox.

=== San Francisco Giants ===
On August 11, 2021, González was claimed off of release waivers by the San Francisco Giants. On November 30, González was non-tendered by the Giants, making him a free agent. On January 13, 2022, González re-signed with the Giants. On April 22, González's contract was selected by the Giants after an injury to Steven Duggar.

On April 25, González hit his first major league home run off of Jake Cousins in the top of the 9th inning. His two-run homer gave the Giants a 4–2 lead against the Milwaukee Brewers, and the Giants went on to win the game. On May 15, González hit a 3-run home run off of the St. Louis Cardinals’ Albert Pujols. Coincidentally, González had also been brought in to pitch in the game, marking a position player pitcher homering off of another position player pitching. González was named the NL Rookie of the Month in May 2022.

In 2022 with the Giants, he batted .254/.323/.360 in 311 at bats, with four home runs, 36 RBIs, and 10 stolen bases in 12 attempts. He played 69 games in right field, 52 in left field, six in center field, five (and 6.1 innings) as a relief pitcher, and three as a DH. With Triple-A Sacramento, he batted .290/.402/.540 in 92 at bats, with six home runs and 32 RBIs.

On February 26, 2023, it was announced that González would miss 4–6 weeks with a lower back strain. On March 10, it was announced that González would require surgery to repair a herniated disc in his lower back, and miss 16 weeks in recovery. On August 7, González was activated from the injured list and optioned to the Triple–A Sacramento River Cats. On August 14, he was designated for assignment by the Giants following the promotion of Wade Meckler. He cleared waivers and was sent outright to Sacramento on August 21. On September 12, González was released by the Giants organization.

=== New York Yankees ===
On December 21, 2023, González signed a minor league contract with the New York Yankees. In 22 appearances for the Triple–A Scranton/Wilkes-Barre RailRiders, he batted .282/.374/.397 with no home runs, five RBI, and three stolen bases. González was released by the Yankees organization on May 9, 2024.

On July 5, 2024, González signed with the Acereros de Monclova of the Mexican League. He spent the season on the reserve list and did not appear in a game with Monclova in the 2024 season.

=== High Point Rockers ===
On April 7, 2025, González signed with the High Point Rockers of the Atlantic League of Professional Baseball. On July 11, González signed with the Acereros de Monclova of the Mexican League. However, he did not appear for the team and returned to the Rockets to complete the season. In 111 appearances for High Point, González slashed .297/.410/.517 with 21 home runs, 73 RBI, and 36 stolen bases. Following the season, González was named to the Atlantic League All-Defensive Team, having made one error across 115 total chances. He became a free agent following the season.

=== Acereros de Monclova ===
On March 14, 2026, Gonzalez signed with the Acereros de Monclova of the Mexican League. In 57 appearances for the Acereros, he batted .290/.387/.456 with six home runs, 32 RBI, and four stolen bases.

=== Olmecas de Tabasco ===
On July 4, 2026, González was traded to the Olmecas de Tabasco of the Mexican League in exchange for Leo Heras.
