= Yunior Marte (baseball, born 1995) =

Dominican baseball player (born 1995)

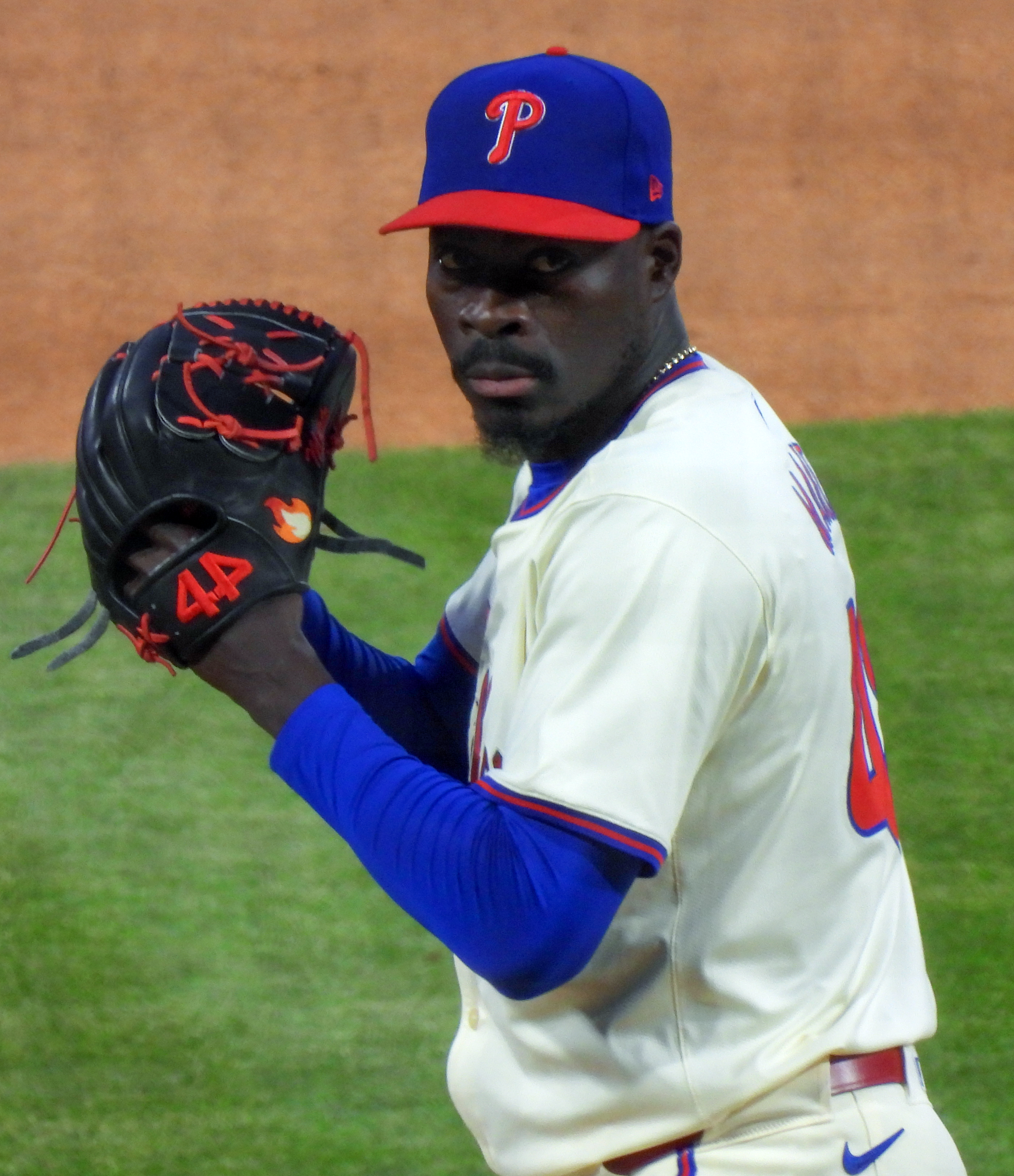
- Marte with the Philadelphia Phillies in 2024

Tohoku Rakuten Golden Eagles – No. 23
- Pitcher
- Born: February 2, 1995 (age 31); Santo Domingo, Dominican Republic
- Bats: Right Throws: Right

Professional debut
- MLB: April 12, 2022, for the San Francisco Giants
- NPB: April 5, 2025, for the Chunichi Dragons

MLB statistics (through May 29, 2026)
- Win–loss record: 2–2
- Earned run average: 5.94
- Strikeouts: 106

NPB statistics (through August 21, 2026)
- Win–loss record: 1–4
- Earned run average: 2.25
- Strikeouts: 33
- Stats at Baseball Reference

Teams
- San Francisco Giants (2022); Philadelphia Phillies (2023–2024); Chunichi Dragons (2025); Cincinnati Reds (2026); Tohoku Rakuten Golden Eagles (2026–present)

Yunior Marte (born February 2, 1995) is a Dominican professional baseball pitcher for the Tohoku Rakuten Golden Eagles of Nippon Professional Baseball (NPB). He has previously played in Major League Baseball (MLB) for the San Francisco Giants, Philadelphia Phillies, and Cincinnati Reds, and in NPB for the Chunichi Dragons. In 2012, he was signed as an international free agent by the Kansas City Royals.

== Early and personal life ==
Marte was born in Santo Domingo, in the Dominican Republic. During the offseason he lives in Santo Domingo Norte, Dominican Republic.

== Career ==
=== Kansas City Royals ===
On July 19, 2012, when he was 17 years of age, he was signed as an international free agent by the Kansas City Royals for $200,000, but the result of his medical exams indicated that he had an elbow injury, so the team gave up signing him and days later negotiated with his agent and reached a $75,000 agreement. In 2013, Marte was named Dominican Royals Pitcher of the Year in the Dominican Summer League, after going 4–3 with an earned run average of 1.71 in 11 appearances covering 47 1/3 innings. Marte spent the 2014 season with the rookie-level Burlington Royals, posting a 4–3 record and 3.44 earned run average and 8 hit by pitches (2nd-highest in the league) over 52 1/3 innings in 11 contests.

In 2015, Marte played for the Single-A Lexington Legends. He recorded a 4–5 record and 6.44 earned run average with 60 strikeouts, 38 walks (5.2 walks per 9 innings; 7th-highest in the league), 12 hit by pitch (6th in the league), 14 wild pitches (9th), and a 1.797 walks plus hits per inning pitched (third-highest in the league) over 65 2/3 innings in 18 games.

In 2016, for Single-A Lexington, Marte was 6–8 with one save and a 4.21 earned run average in 26 games (7 starts), in which he pitched a career-high 107 innings, threw 19 wild pitches (2nd in the South Atlantic League), led the league with 3 balks, walked 55 batters (6th-most in the league, and his 4.6 walks-per-9-innings were 7th-highest in the league), and struck out 103 batters (with his 1.87 strikeouts per walks rate being 10th-lowest in the league). He ranked sixth among South Atlantic League relievers with a batting average against of .225.

In 2017, Marte was a Carolina League mid-season All Star with the High-A Wilmington Blue Rocks. He also made 17 appearances for the Double-A Northwest Arkansas Naturals on the year, in which he was 1–2 while registering a 5.75 earned run average with 27 walks (6.8 walks per 9 innings pitched) and 38 strikeouts (9.5 strikeouts per 9 innings pitched) in 36 innings, with a walks plus hits per inning pitched of 1.667. In 2018 pitching for the Double–A Northwest Arkansas Naturals he was 4–4 with two saves and a 2.91 earned run average in 43 relief appearances in which Marte pitched 80 1/3 innings and struck out 80 batters.

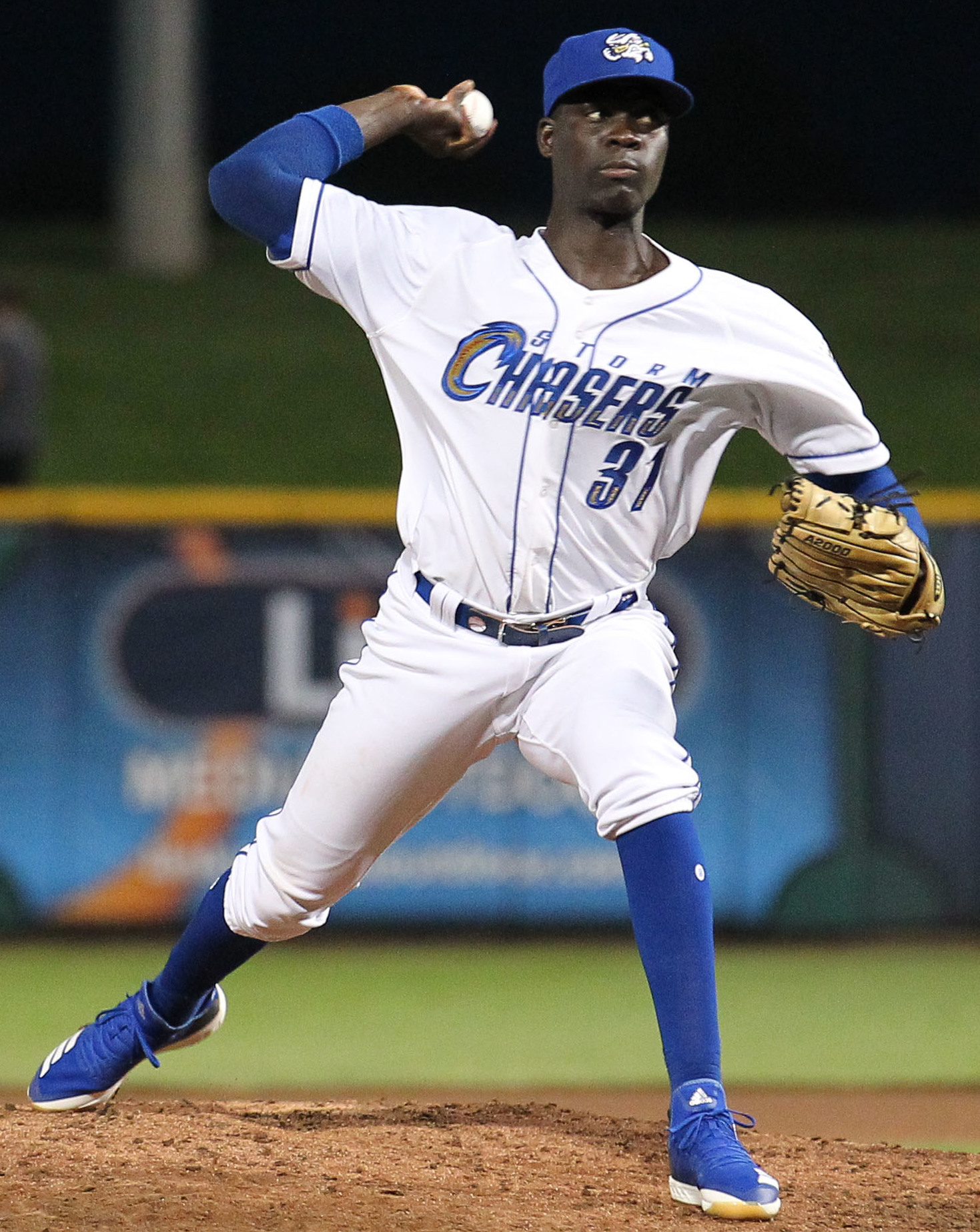
Marte pitching for the Omaha Storm Chasers in 2019

In 2019, Marte split the year between Northwest Arkansas and the Triple-A Omaha Storm Chasers. In 14 relief appearances between the two teams, he posted a 4.19 earned run average with 12 walks (5.6 walks per 9 innings) and 15 strikeouts in 19 1/3 innings of work, and a walks plus hits per inning pitched of 1.552. Marte did not play in a game in 2020 due to the cancellation of the minor league season because of the COVID-19 pandemic. On November 2, 2020, he elected minor league free agency.

=== San Francisco Giants ===
On December 9, 2020, Marte signed a minor league contract with the San Francisco Giants organization. In 2021 for the Triple-A Sacramento River Cats, Marte was 0–3 with four saves and a 3.49 earned run average in 56 2/3 innings in which he gave up 23 walks and had 62 strikeouts (9.8 strikeouts per 9 innings) and a 1.465 walks plus hits per inning pitched over 43 games (one start). The Giants added Marte to their 40-man roster following the 2021 season.

After 3 scoreless appearances for Sacramento, on April 12, 2022, Marte was promoted to the major leagues for the first time to fill in for Tyler Rogers, who had been placed on paternity leave. Marte made his major league debut that day, pitching a scoreless inning of relief and allowing one hit to close out a 13–2 victory over the San Diego Padres. Marte was optioned back to Triple-A the following day after John Brebbia was reinstated from the bereavement list. On October 5, Marte earned his first career win after pitching two perfect innings against the San Diego Padres.

Pitching for the Giants in 2022, he was 1–1 with a 5.44 earned run average in 39 relief appearances, in which he pitched 48 innings and gave up 22 walks while striking out 44 batters, and had a walks plus hits per inning pitched of 1.438. Batters had a barrel percentage against him of 3.5%, in the lowest 3% in the major leagues. He mostly threw an 86 mph slider, a 97 mph sinker, and a 98 mph four-seam fastball. Pitching for Sacramento in 2022 he was 1–1 with three saves and a 3.16 earned run average in 25 relief appearances, in which he pitched 25 2/3 innings, giving up nine hits and striking out 35 batters.

=== Philadelphia Phillies ===
On January 9, 2023, the Giants traded Marte to the Philadelphia Phillies in exchange for pitcher Erik Miller. Pitching for the Phillies in 2023, he was 1–1 with a 5.03 earned run average, as he had a 1.627 walks plus hits per inning pitched in 39 1/3 innings over 40 games.

Marte made 23 appearances for the Phillies in 2024, struggling to a 6.92 earned run average with 23 strikeouts across 26 innings pitched. On November 4, Marte was removed from the 40–man roster and sent outright to the Triple–A Lehigh Valley IronPigs, but he rejected the assignment and elected free agency.

=== Chunichi Dragons ===
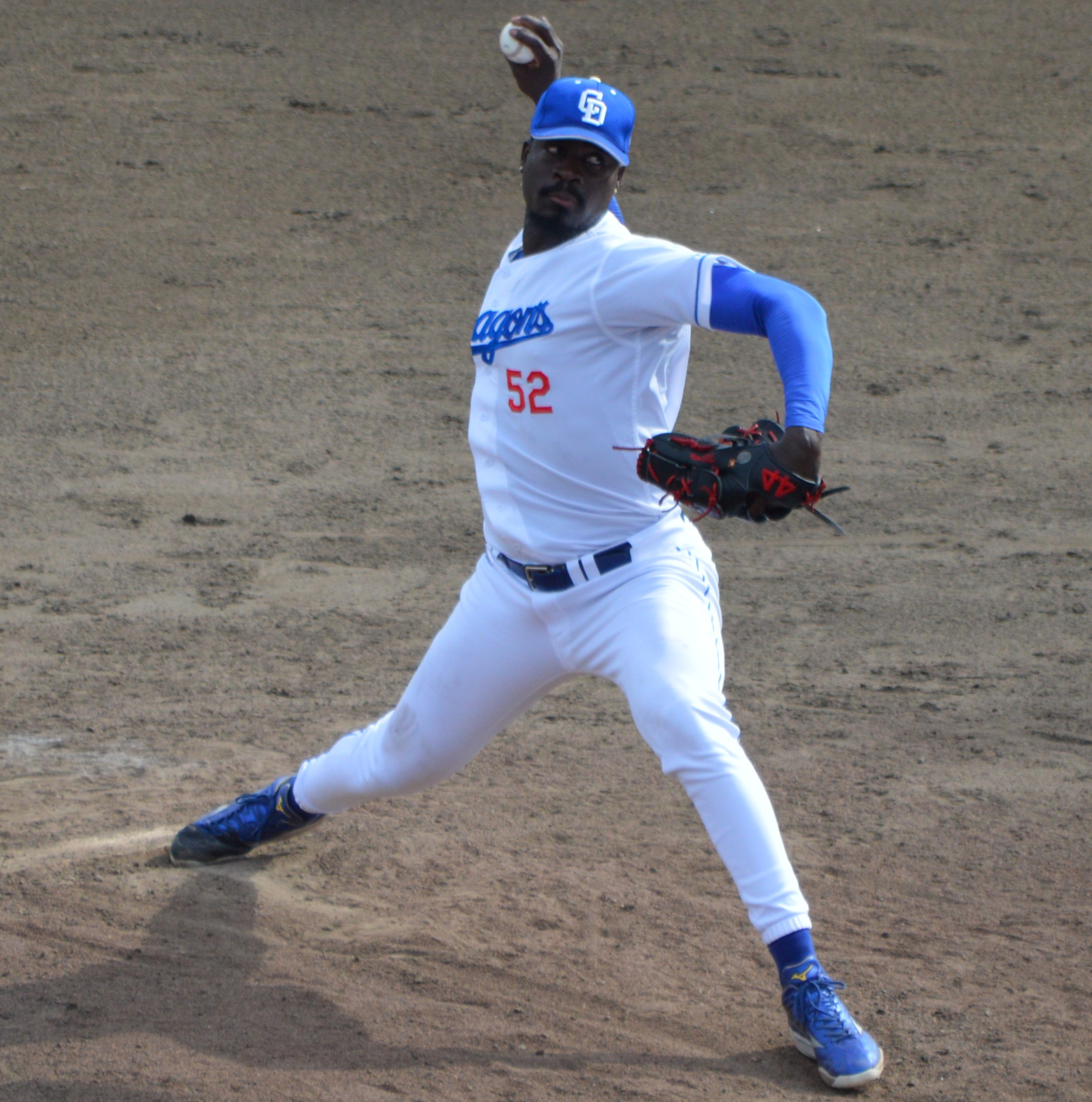
Marte pitching for the Dragons.

On November 23, 2024, Marte signed a minor league contract with the Seattle Mariners organization. However, on February 5, 2025, Marte signed with the Chunichi Dragons of Nippon Professional Baseball. He made 35 appearances for Chunichi, posting a 1–4 record and 1.95 ERA with 25 strikeouts and two saves across 32 1/3 innings pitched. On December 3, it was announced that the Dragons would not bring Marte back for the 2026 season.

=== Cincinnati Reds ===
On December 30, 2025, Marte signed a minor league contract with the Cincinnati Reds. He began the regular season with the Triple-A Louisville Bats, registering a 2–0 record and 5.12 ERA with 26 strikeouts and five saves across his first 20 appearances. On May 29, 2026, the Reds selected Marte's contract, adding him to their active roster. In his lone pitching appearance for the Reds, Marte allowed four runs on three hits, one walk, and one strikeout. On June 1, Marte was designated for assignment by the Reds. Two days later, Marte cleared waivers, refused an outright assignment to Triple-A Louisville, and elected for free agency.

=== Pittsburgh Pirates ===
On June 6, 2026, Marte signed a minor league contract with the Pittsburgh Pirates. He made five appearances for the Triple–A Indianapolis Indians, posting a 1–1 record and 6.75 ERA with 10 strikeouts across 6 2/3 innings of relief. Marte was released by the Pirates organization on July 4.

=== Tohoku Rakuten Golden Eagles ===
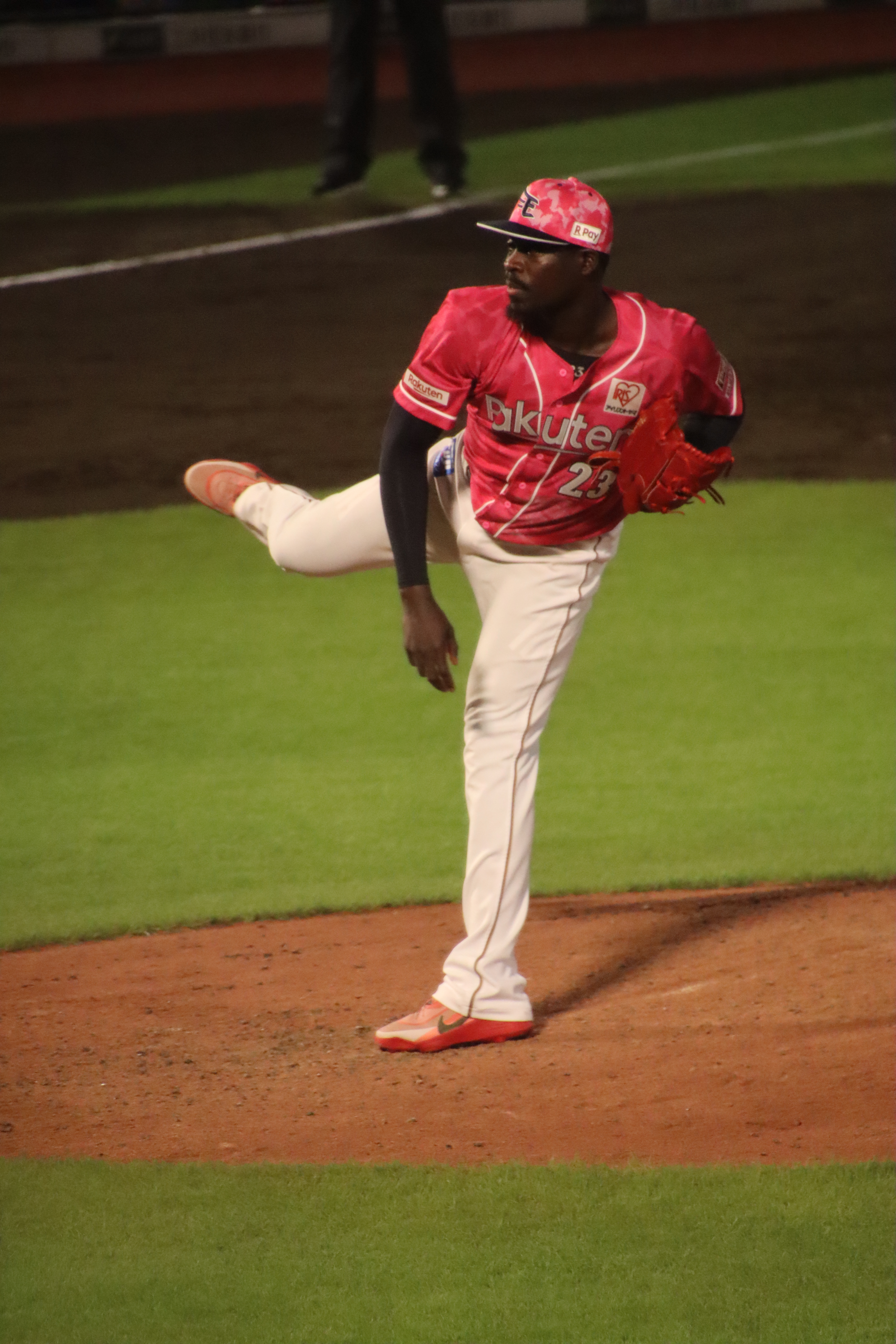
Marte pitching for the Golden Eagles

On July 6, 2026, Marte signed with the Tohoku Rakuten Golden Eagles of Nippon Professional Baseball.

== See also ==
- List of Major League Baseball players from the Dominican Republic
