= Saint Patrick's Day (disambiguation) =

Saint Patrick's Day is a cultural and religious celebration held on March 17.

Saint Patrick's Day or Patrick's Day may also refer to:

- St. Patrick's Day (album), an album by Bing Crosby
- Patrick's Day (film), a 2014 Irish film
- St Patrick's Day (play), an 18th-century British play
- "St. Patrick's Day" (The Office), an episode of The Office
- "St. Patrick's Day" (30 Rock), an episode of 30 Rock
- Saint Patrick's Day Test, a rugby match

== See also ==
- Saint Patrick's Day Parade (disambiguation)
- The Great St. Patrick’s Day Flood, a 1936 flood in Pittsburgh
  - The Great Saint Patrick's Day Flood, a children's novel about this event
- List of films set around St. Patrick's Day
- List of St. Patrick's Day television specials
- Live on St. Patrick's Day from Boston, MA, an album by Dropkick Murphys
- 2012 St. Patrick's Day beating, an American crime
- The Saint Patrick's Day Four, American peace activists
- St. Patrick's Day festival Coatbridge, a Scottish event
- Saint Patrick's Day in the United States, various American celebrations and traditions
- St. Patrick's Day Snowstorm, an 1892 American storm
