= Saint Patrick's Day in the United States =

Widely-celebrated with drinking and parades in mid-March

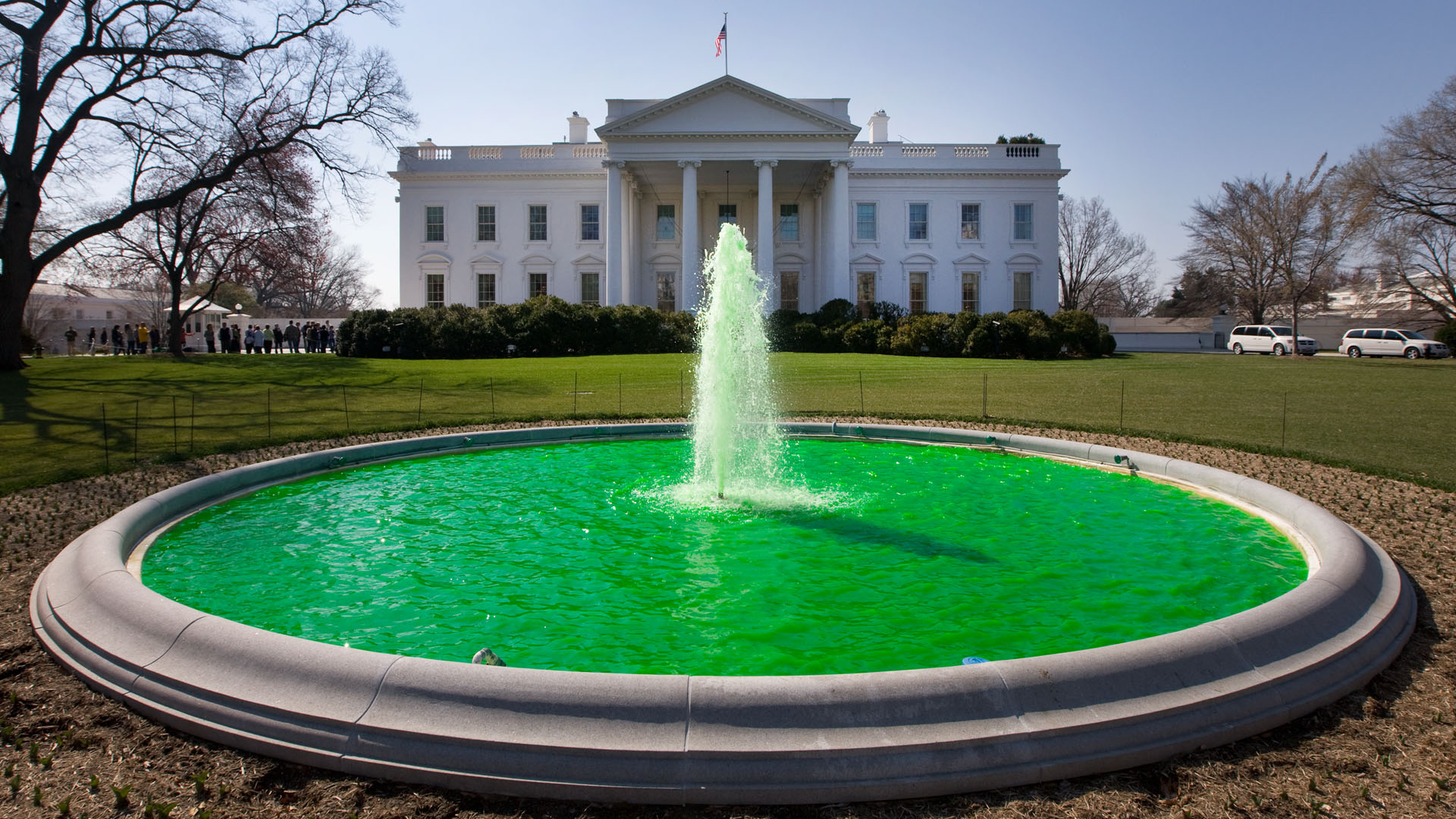
The north White House fountain. The public fountains at the White House have been dyed green for Saint Patrick's Day annually since 2009.

Saint Patrick's Day, although a legal holiday only in Savannah, Georgia, and Suffolk County, Massachusetts, is nonetheless widely recognized and celebrated throughout the United States. It is primarily celebrated as a recognition of Irish and Irish American culture; celebrations include prominent displays of the color green, eating and drinking, religious observances, and numerous parades. The holiday has been celebrated in what became the U.S. since 1601.

According to the National Retail Federation, consumers in the United States spent $4.4 billion on St. Patrick's Day in 2016. This amount is down from the $4.8 billion spent in 2014.

== Early celebrations ==
The first recorded St Patrick's Day celebration in America was in St. Augustine, Spanish Florida, in the year 1600 according to Michael Franicis's 2017 research. Franicis discovered the first St. Patrick Day Parade was also in St. Augustine in 1601. Both were organized by the Spanish Colony's Catholic Irish vicar Ricardo Artur (Richard Arthur).

The Charitable Irish Society of Boston organized the first observance of Saint Patrick's Day in the Thirteen Colonies in 1737. Surprisingly, the celebration was not Catholic in nature, Irish immigration to the colonies having been dominated by Protestants. The society's purpose in gathering was simply to honor its homeland, and although they continued to meet annually to coordinate charitable works for the Irish community in Boston, they did not meet on 16 March again until 1794. During the observance of the day, individuals attended a service of worship and a special dinner.

New York's first Saint Patrick's Day observance was similar to that of Boston. It was held on 16 March 1762 in the home of John Marshall, an Irish Protestant, and over the next few years informal gatherings by Irish immigrants were the norm. The first recorded parade in New York was by Irish soldiers in the British Army in 1766. The first documented St. Patrick's Day Celebration in Philadelphia was held in 1771. Philadelphia's Friendly Sons of St. Patrick was founded in that year to honor St. Patrick and to provide relief to Irish immigrants in the city. Irish Americans have celebrated St. Patrick's Day in Philadelphia since their arrival in America. General George Washington, a member of Philadelphia's Friendly Sons of St. Patrick, actively encouraged Irish American patriots to join the Continental Army. In 1780, while camped in Morristown, NJ, General Washington allowed his troops a holiday on 17 March "as an act of solidarity with the Irish in their fight for independence." This event became known as The Saint Patrick's Day Encampment of 1780.

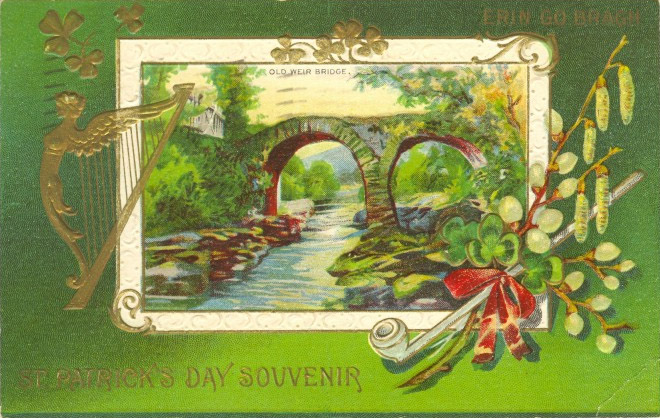
Postcard postmarked 1912 in the United States

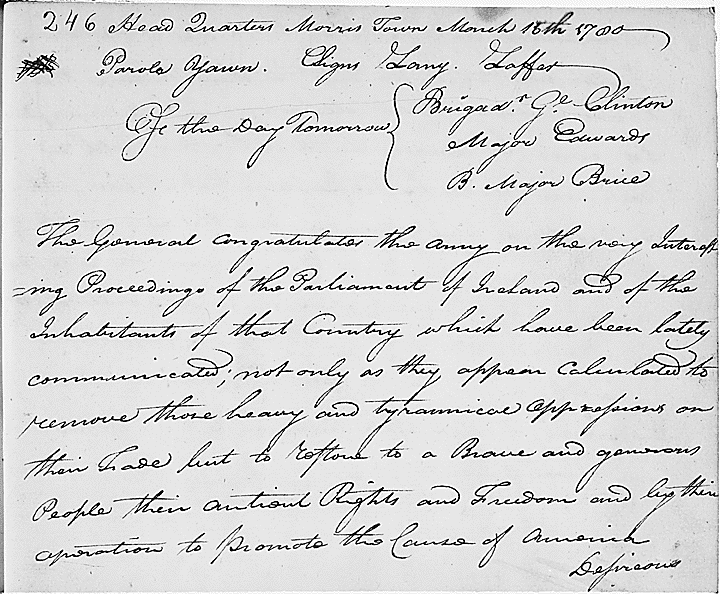
George Washington's General Order of 16 March 1780, granting Saint Patrick's Day as a holiday to the troops

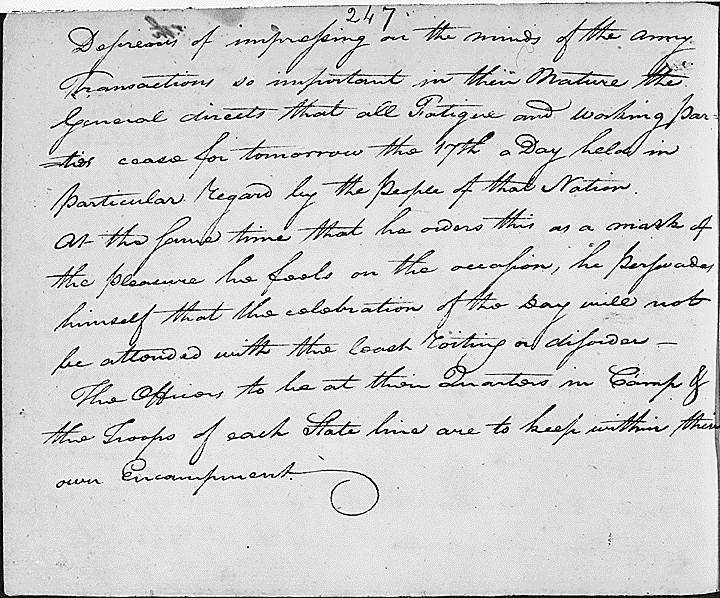
George Washington's General Order of 16 March 1780, granting Saint Patrick's Day as a holiday to the troops, page 2

Irish patriotism in New York City continued to soar, and the parade in New York City continued to grow. Irish aid societies like Friendly Sons of Saint Patrick and the Hibernian Society were created and marched in the parades. Finally when many of these aid societies joined forces in 1848, the parade became not only the largest parade in the United States but one of the largest in the world.

The City of Savannah, Georgia, has hosted Saint Patrick's Day celebrations since 1824. It boasts a celebration rivaling that of New York City in size and fervor. Unlike any other cities, Savannah's historic parade is always held on March 17, not on the neighboring weekend. Festivities begin more than a week in advance with communal rituals and commemorative ceremonies, such as the St. Patrick's Parade. Such events were, in fact, the main factors in shaping Irish-American identity as recognized today. In fact, leading up to the 1870s, Irish-American identity in the United States was reworked through the shifting character of the Saint Patrick's Day rituals and features under three separate occasions: Initially, in 1853 when it undertook a "spiritual rhetoric" notion, then when it became known as a "reformulated memory of an Irish past couched in terms of vengeance against Britain" to, finally, adopting a "sectarian catholic nationalism" attitude in the 1870s and 1880s.

In fact, ceremonies represent the very "junctures at which processes of identity formation surface through representation," which implies that ritual practices represent the molding tools people turn to in order to build a national identity. Furthermore, incorporating "the analysis of commemorative rituals" becomes a valuable element "in the context of broader historical studies" as such analysis reveals much about the collective conscience of the Irish-American community.

There is a clear gradual shift toward a nationalist attitude in the Irish-American Diaspora which can be detected in the prose of Doheny's commemorative speech in 1853, but the "complete ascendency to a nationalist [approach] in Irish identity" truly came in the 1870s and 1880s. More important, there were already numerous evidences of a national identity present in the Irish Catholic labouring classes prior to the settlement of an Irish-Catholic community in America. Despite the longing memory of a loved lost Ireland, the main factor that contributed to creating a clear "sense of group unity" in the Irish-American community really came with the hatred sentiments that were felt towards "British oppression and resistance".

Furthermore, there is a turnover in perspectives towards the causes of the Great famine in the mind of the Irish-American that can be traced: One that varies from a "mourning religious view", seen in Archbishop Hughes' sermon, to a perspective that shifts the blame towards the British monarchy for its indifference and greed, seen in Cahill's speech in 1860. From that point on, all the following commemorative speeches on the Saint Patrick's Day invoked nationalist themes such as "British hatred" and "heroic struggle" and led the way for the creation of a "new parade" which gained in adherents and absorbed "elements of American patriotism and full-fledged nationalism". The result was such that the Irish-American community came to regard itself in the 1870s as a community that defined itself by dual loyalties on one hand, and in another as "a unified common organism," which gathered in strength on the basis that they had a common past, "not a religious one but one that centered on the common Irish experience of British oppression and suffering". In other words, this goes to show that the shifting character of commemorative rituals experienced during the Saint Patrick's parade have influenced the development of American culture in a larger sense, since it contributed to enriching its heritage and making of its Irish-American Diaspora a prideful concept to be celebrated and admired.

== Modern customs ==
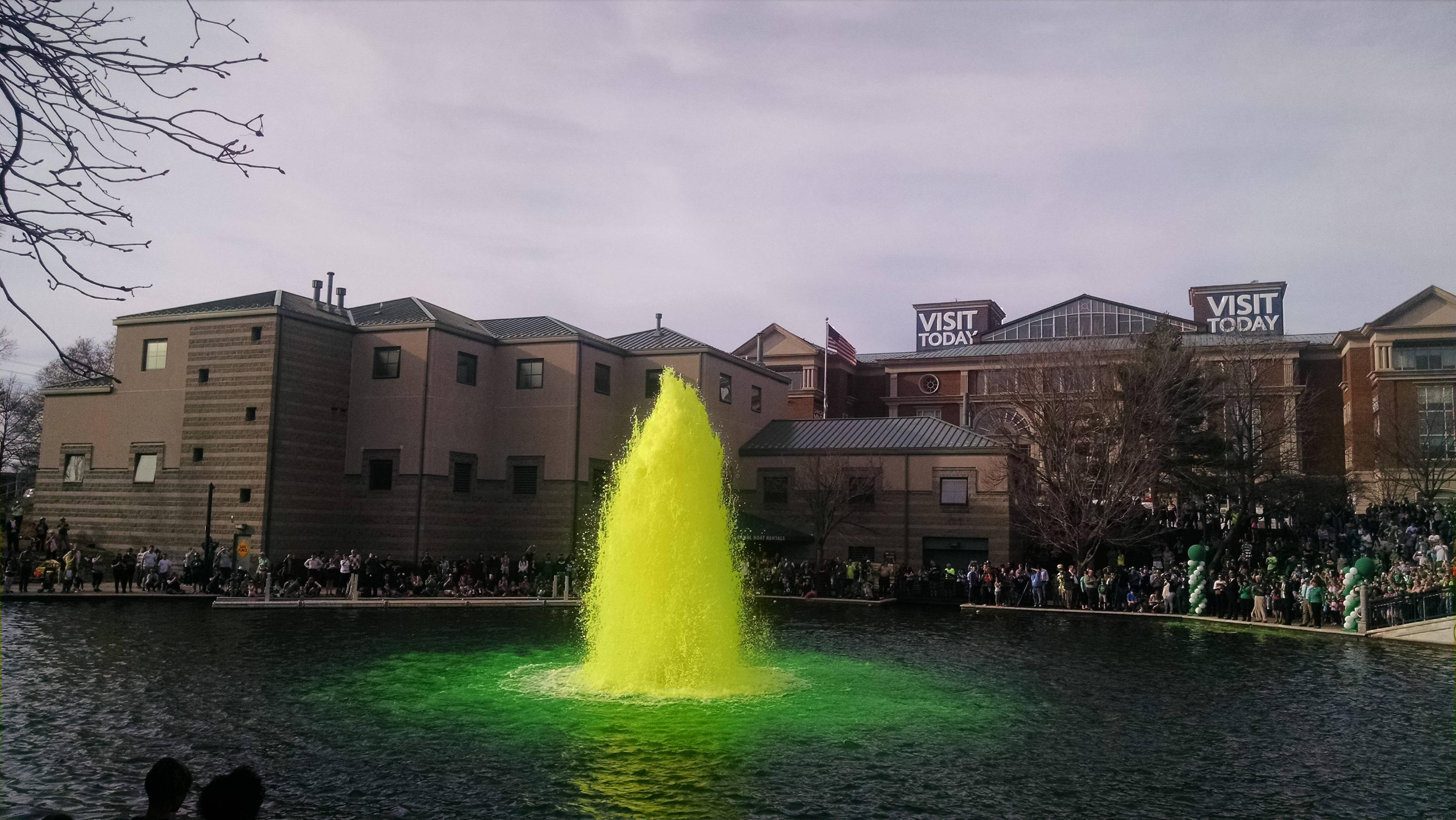
Canal in downtown Indianapolis dyed green in commemoration of St. Patrick's Day, 2015

In every year since 1991, March has been proclaimed Irish-American Heritage Month by the US Congress or President due to the date of Saint Patrick's Day. Christian denominations in the United States observing this feast day include the Evangelical Lutheran Church in America, Episcopal Church (United States), and the Roman Catholic Church. Today, Saint Patrick's Day is widely celebrated in America by Irish and non-Irish alike. For most Irish-Americans, this holiday is both religious and festive. It is one of the leading days for consumption of alcohol in the United States, as individuals are allowed to break their Lenten sacrifices for the day in order to celebrate Saint Patrick's Day. Alcohol consumption levels vary by state. The consumption of artificially colored green beer is a common celebration. Green Beer Day, for instance, is a tradition among students at Miami University in Ohio dating to 1952; the day has been held on the Thursday before spring break due to the fact that Saint Patrick's Day often occurs during the spring recess. The holiday has been criticized for promoting over-indulgence in alcohol, resulting in drunk driving, property damage, absenteeism, public urination and vomiting, and other ill effects. A notable difference between traditions widely observed in the United States versus those of Ireland is the consumption of corned beef, which is not a traditional Irish dish, but rather one that was adopted by the new immigrants upon their arrival in the 19th century.

Many people choose to wear green colored clothing and items. Traditionally, those who are caught not wearing green are pinched "affectionately".

Seattle and other cities paint the traffic stripe of their parade routes green. Chicago dyes its river green and has done so since 1962 when sewer workers used green dye to check for sewer discharges and had the idea to turn the river green for Saint Patrick's Day. Originally 100 pounds of vegetable dye was used to turn the river green for a whole week but now only forty pounds of dye is used and the color only lasts for several hours. Indianapolis also dyes its main canal green. Savannah dyes its downtown city fountains green. Missouri University of Science and Technology - St Pat's Board Alumni paint 12 city blocks kelly green with mops before the annual parade. In Jamestown, New York, the Chadakoin River (a small tributary that connects Conewango Creek with its source at Chautauqua Lake) is dyed green each year.

Columbia, South Carolina, dyes its fountain green in the area known as Five Points (a popular collegiate location near the University of South Carolina). A two-day celebration is held over St Patrick's Day weekend. In Boston, Evacuation Day is celebrated as a public holiday for Suffolk County. While officially commemorating the British departure from Boston, it was made an official holiday after Saint Patrick's Day parades had been occurring in Boston for several decades and is believed to have been popularized because of its falling on the same day as Saint Patrick's Day. Since 1992, the participation of gay and lesbian people in the Boston parade has been disputed and this was the subject of the 1995 U.S. Supreme Court case Hurley v. Irish-American Gay, Lesbian, and Bisexual Group of Boston. The New York parade has experienced a similar controversy since 1991, with boycotts by Mayors Menino and Dinkins. Mayor Bill de Blasio did not attend the 2014 New York City parade, but the ban on gays and lesbians in the New York City parade was announced to have been lifted on September 3, 2014. Mayor Walsh did not attend the Boston parade in 2014, but did so in 2015 and 2016. Walsh did not march in the 2017 parade.

In the Northeastern United States, peas are traditionally planted on Saint Patrick's Day.

== Abbreviations ==
The accepted abbreviated form of Saint Patrick's Day is correctly spelled St. Paddy's Day; however, in the United States, it is frequently—and erroneously—shortened to St. Patty's, which is incorrect. Patty is a shortening of the feminine name Patricia. Patrick is the Anglicized form of the Gaelic name, Padraig, shortened to Paddy.

According to Merriam-Webster,

Patrick is the Anglicized form of Pádraig, nicknamed Páidín and Paddy.

In 2022, CNN wrote: "On the Emerald Isle, we say St. Patty's about as much as we utter "top O' the mornin to ye" while eating corned beef and cabbage alongside a leprechaun minding a pot of gold and wearing a four-leaf clover in our lapel – i.e., absolutely never." Additionally, Irish-born reporter Donie O'Sullivan is quoted as saying: "I poke fun at my friends here who might call it St. Patty's Day, but it's not a big deal."

However, Merriam-Webster also points out how some find the phrasing 'St. Paddy's Day' inappropriate as the word Paddy has long since been a disparaging name for an Irishman. In 18th century informal British English, paddy refers to "a fit of temper."

== Celebrations and parades ==
Many parades are held to celebrate the holiday. The longest-running public parades are:

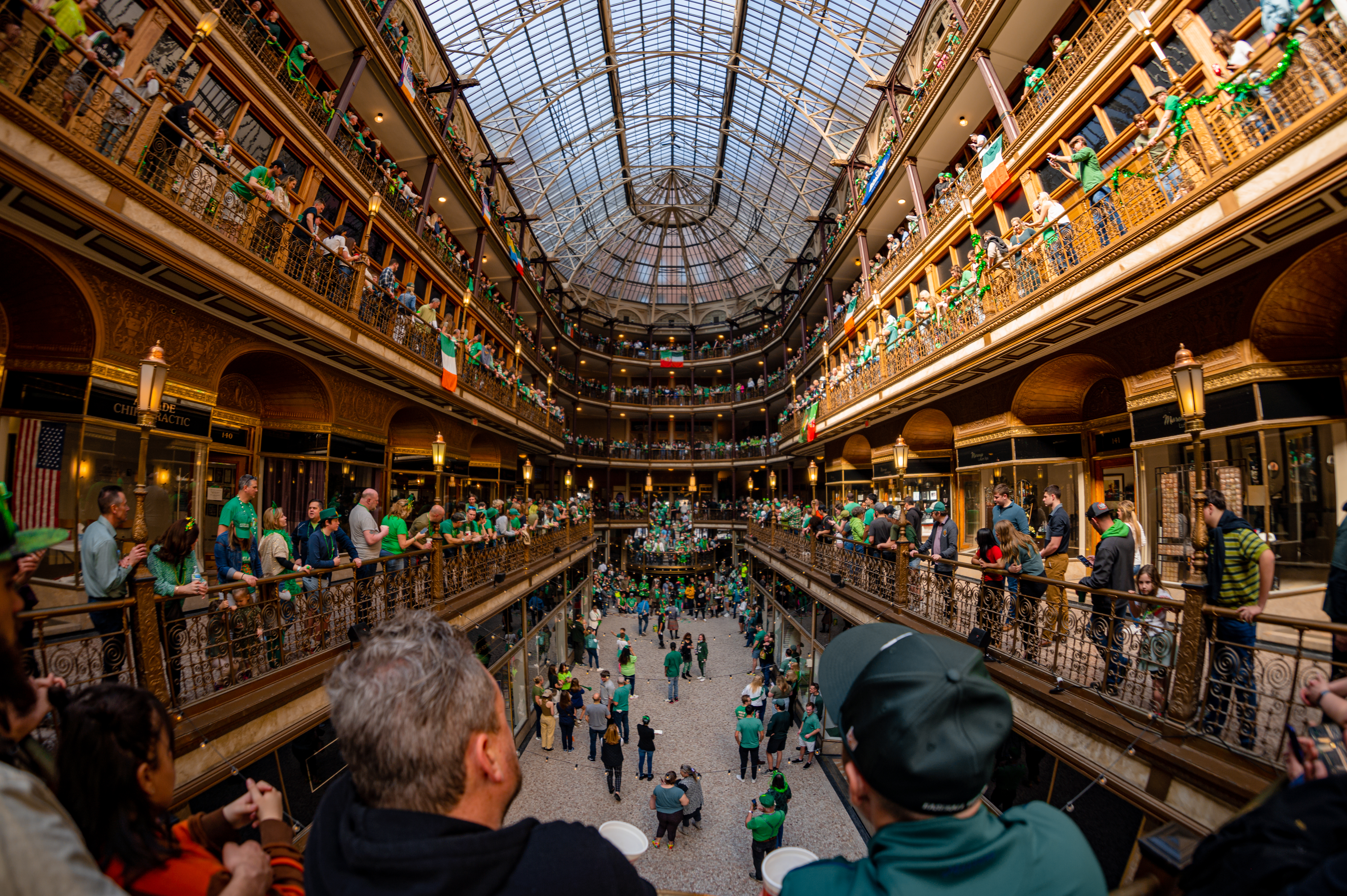
Annual celebration in Downtown Cleveland at the Arcade, 2022

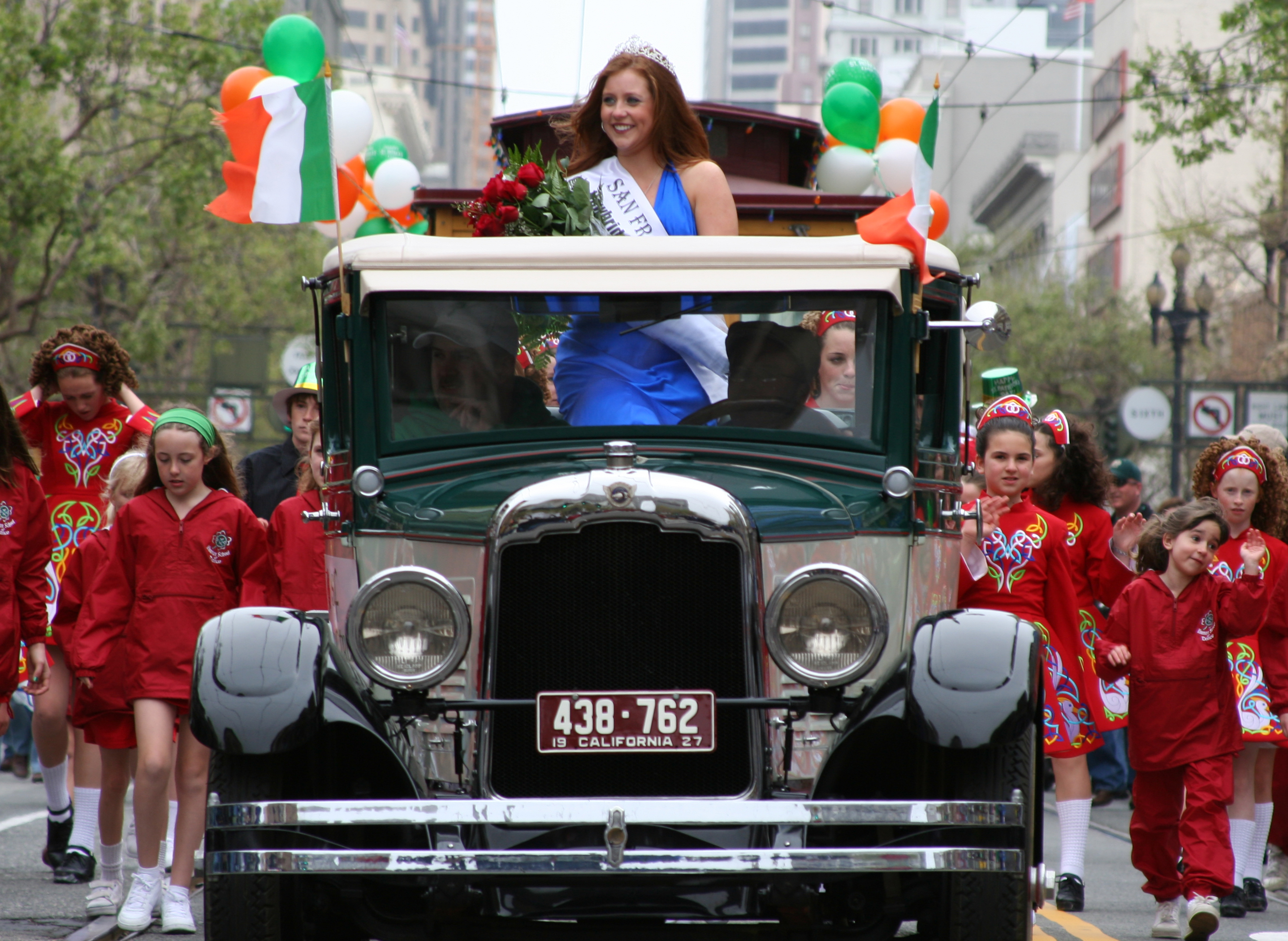
Saint Patrick's Day parade, San Francisco, 2007

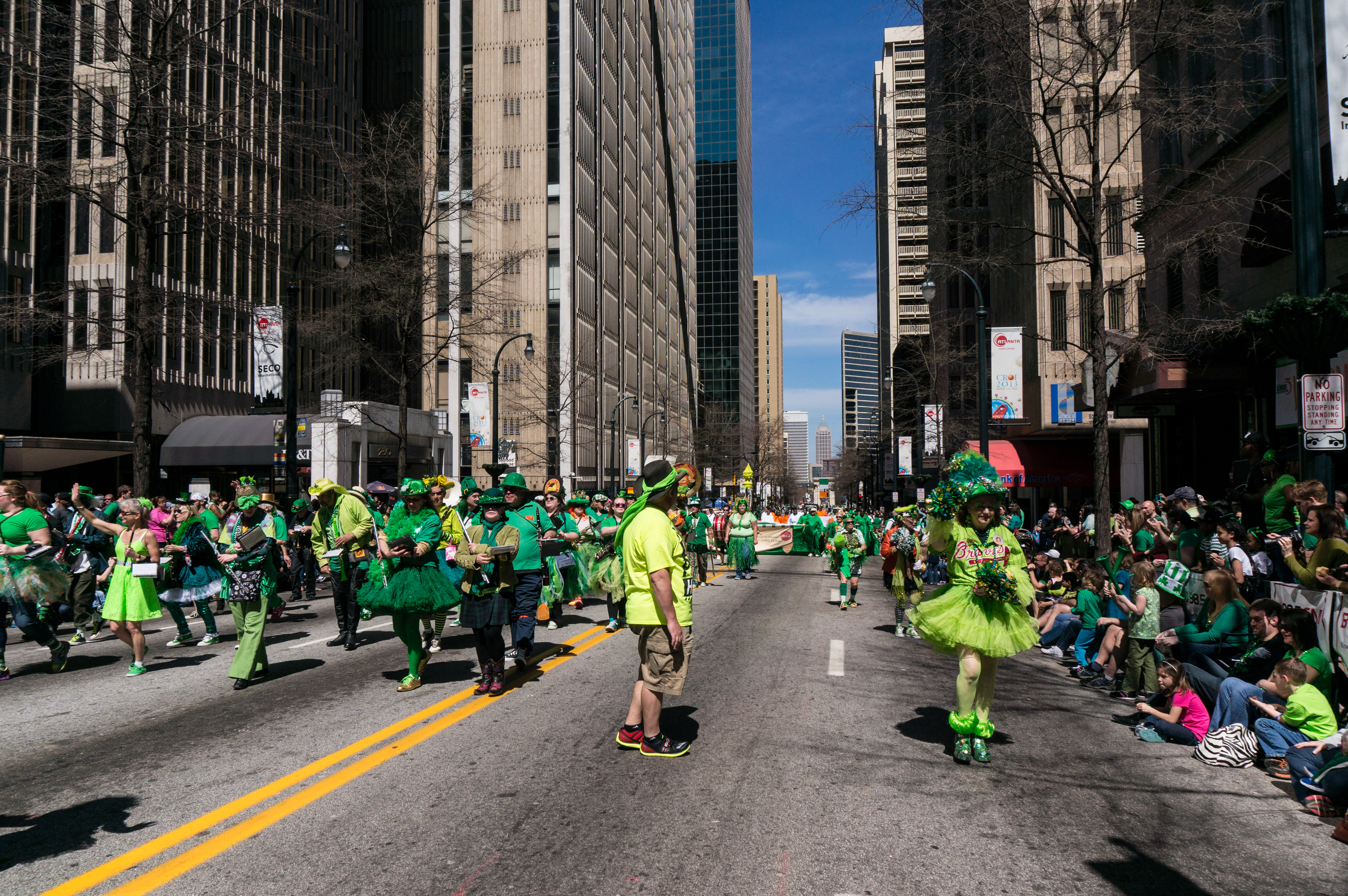
Saint Patrick's Day parade in Atlanta, 2013

- Boston, Massachusetts, since 1737. This began as a gathering, not a parade.
- New York City St. Patrick's Day Parade, New York City, New York, since 1762. This began as a gathering, not a parade.
- Philadelphia, Pennsylvania, since 1771
- Morristown, New Jersey, since 1780
- New Orleans, Louisiana, since 1809
- Buffalo, New York, since 1811
- Savannah, Georgia, since 1824
- Carbondale, Pennsylvania, since 1833
- New Haven, Connecticut, since 1842
- Cleveland, Ohio, since 1842
- Milwaukee Saint Patrick's Day Parade, Milwaukee, Wisconsin, since 1843
- Chicago, Illinois, since 1843
- Saint Paul, Minnesota, since 1851
- San Francisco, since 1852
- Providence, Rhode Island, since 1852 (with periodic interruptions)
- Atlanta, since 1858
- St. Patrick's Day Parade Scranton, Scranton, Pennsylvania, since 1862
- Pittsburgh, Pennsylvania, since 1869
- Kansas City, Missouri, since 1873
- Butte, Montana, since 1882
- Denver, Colorado, since 1889
- Rolla, Missouri, since 1909
- Holyoke Saint Patrick's Day Parade, Holyoke, Massachusetts, since 1952
- Baltimore, Maryland, since 1953
- Bay City, Michigan, since 1955
- Newport, Rhode Island, since 1957
- Detroit St. Patrick's Parade, Detroit, Michigan, 1959
- Pearl River, New York, since 1963
- Cincinnati, Ohio, since 1967
- Delray Beach, Florida, since 1968
- St. Louis, Missouri, since 1820. This began as a gathering, not a parade.
- Norfolk, Virginia, since 1968
- Washington, D.C., since 1971
- Seattle, Washington, since 1972
- Louisville, Kentucky, since 1974
- Belmar, New Jersey, since 1974
- Rochester, New York, since 1977
- Dallas, Texas, since 1979
- Indianapolis, Indiana, since 1980
- Lexington, Kentucky, since 1980
- Peoria, Illinois, since 1980
- San Diego, California, since 1981
- Columbia, South Carolina, since 1982
- Alexandria, Virginia, since 1982
- Worcester, Massachusetts, since 1983
- Birmingham, Alabama, since 1984
- New London, Wisconsin, since 1984

== Cities with major celebrations ==
=== Atlanta, Georgia ===
People in Atlanta, Georgia celebrate St. Patrick's Day by holding a parade that courses through several blocks of a main portion of the city, particularly on Peachtree Street in Midtown Atlanta. In 2012, what was called the largest Irish flag in history was used in Atlanta's parade. The St. Patrick's Day parade has been held in Atlanta since 1858. In the 2014 parade, more than 200 units participated from across the South, and as far away as Ireland.

=== Baltimore, Maryland ===
A parade is held the Sunday before St. Patrick's Day, annually since the 1856, starting at the Washington Monument and ends at Market Place in the Inner Harbor. The Shamrock 5k is held just before the parade starts. There are large events held in the Federal Hill, Canton, Inner Harbor, and Fell's Point neighborhoods. The parade in Baltimore is the largest in Maryland.

=== Boston, Massachusetts ===
St. Patrick's Day is indirectly observed as an official holiday in Boston, as it coincides with the official Evacuation Day holiday observed annually since 1901 to commemorate the day in 1776 that British troops ended their occupation of Boston. A large St. Patrick's Day parade is held in South Boston, Massachusetts. The 3.2-mile parade route starts at Andrew Square (at Broadway MBTA Red Line stop), at the intersection of Dorchester Avenue and Broadway in South Boston, Massachusetts, and travels Dorchester Street to Telegraph Street looping through Dorchester Heights and then bearing right onto East Fourth Street it continues down to 'P' Street bearing left onto East Broadway where it ends (at the Andrew MBTA Red Line stop). Major George F.H. Murray of the Ninth Regiment of the Army was the first chief marshal of Boston's St Patrick's Day parade in 1901. In 2015 the first gay groups (Boston Pride and OutVets) marched in Boston's St. Patrick's Day parade. The 2020 parade was canceled due to concerns about the coronavirus pandemic.

=== Buffalo, New York ===
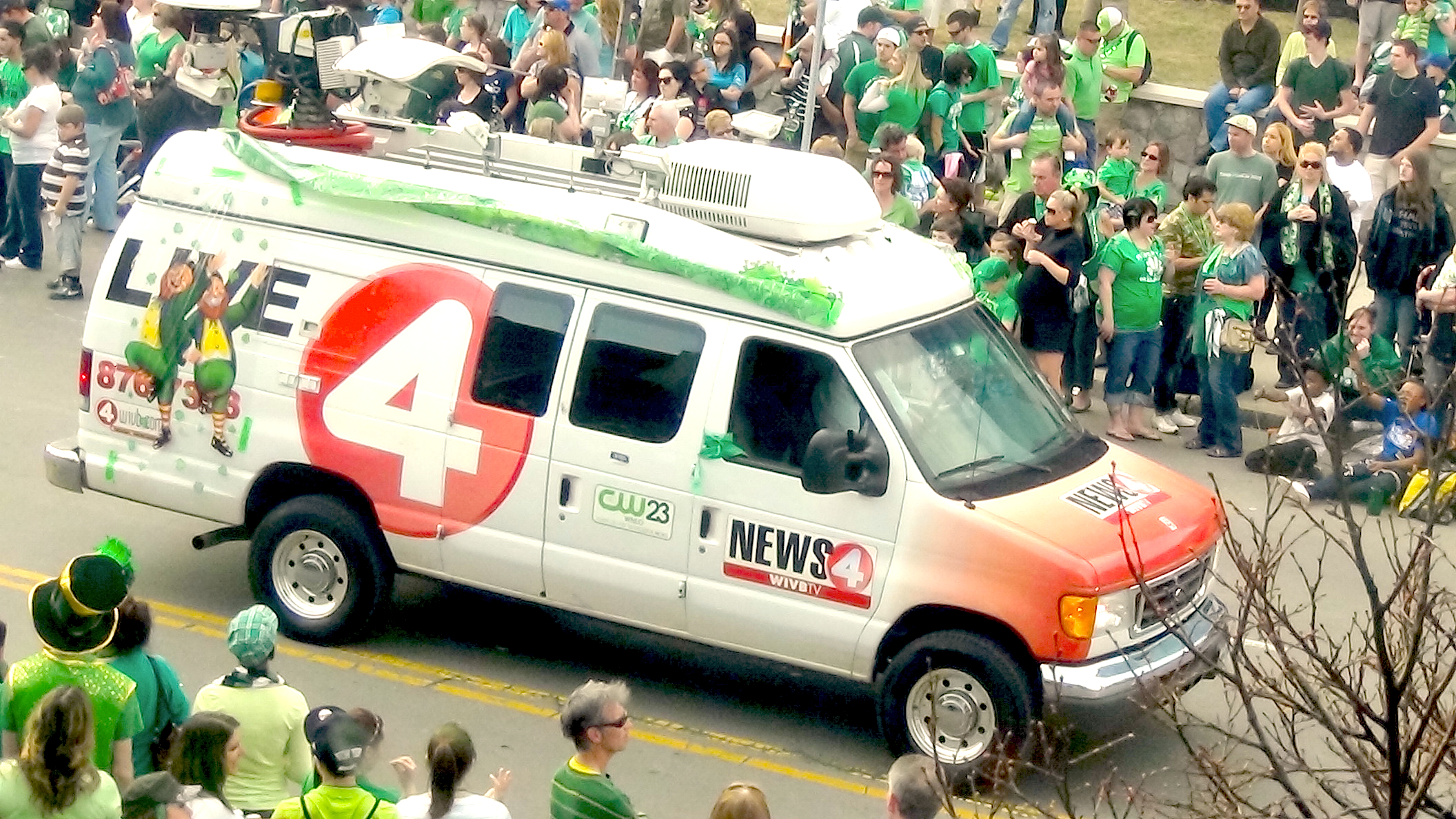
A news truck for WIVB-TV participating in the Buffalo Saint Patrick's Day Parade, 2012

The city of Buffalo has two full Saint Patrick's Day parades. The first is the "Old Neighborhood Parade," which held its 32nd occurrence in 2026; the parade takes place in the city's historic Old First Ward in the predominately Irish South Buffalo on the Saturday nearest Saint Patrick's Day (before or after), with the 2021 parade held in September ("halfway to Saint Patrick's Day"); through 2015, that parade followed a route used by the original Saint Patrick's Day parades in Buffalo, until crowd concerns and drunken rowdiness forced the city to reroute the parade through wider roads in the First Ward. The older, larger "Buffalo Saint Patrick's Day Parade" (which was held for 77 consecutive years through 2019) also takes place, usually on the day after the Old Neighborhood parade. That parade runs from Niagara Square along Delaware Avenue to North Street. The latter parade is the third largest parade in New York State behind the New York City Parade and the Pearl River Parade.

In addition to the full parades, Talty's Tavern in South Buffalo also holds a spoof parade that lasts only one block.

=== Butte, Montana ===
Butte, Montana's mining history brought in a large population of Irish immigrants, to the point that Gaelic was spoken as a common language in the mines and Butte had the highest percentage of Irish population of any city in America, including Boston. Today, the city's population is under 40,000 people, and the annual St. Patrick's Day celebration brings in roughly 30,000 visitors each year, nearly doubling the city's population for the day. Butte has a long history of running a parade through the Uptown District of the city and hosting music at a number of venues, including numerous bars, including one featuring booths created from church pews that had been imported from Dublin and a stone imported from County Clare at the door for visitors to touch. Until 2013 there was no open container law in Butte, and the current ordinance only prohibits open containers between 2:00 am and 8:00 am. The day's events have a reputation for rowdy celebrations.

=== Chicago, Illinois ===
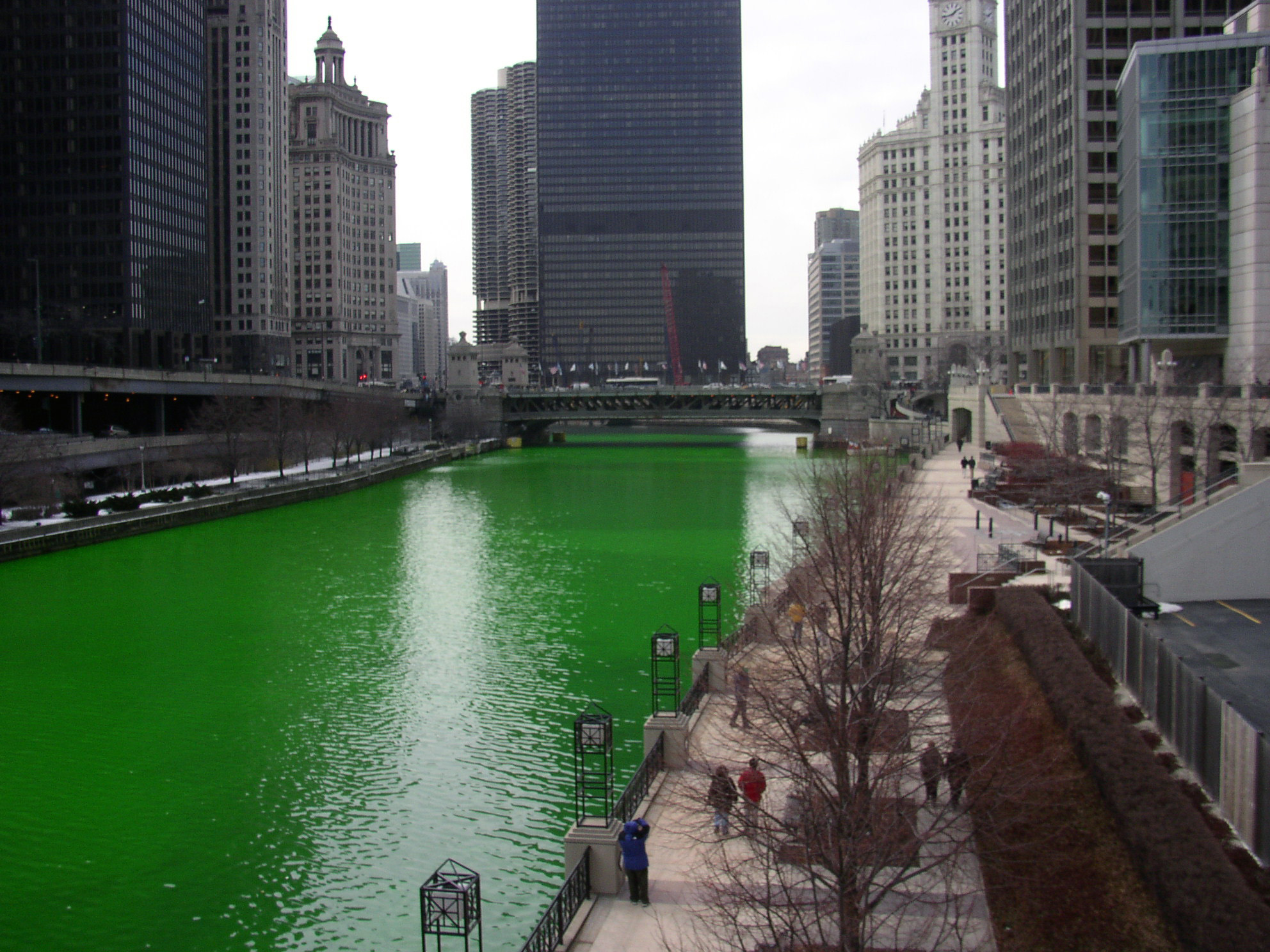
The Chicago River dyed green for Saint Patrick's Day

The city has many different Saint Patrick's Day celebrations. The city hosts several parades annually. The main Chicago parade dates back to 1843 and became an official city event in the 1950s. In 1962, the city also began its famous Chicago St. Patrick's Day tradition of dyeing of the Chicago River green, with thousands of people lining the streets along the river to watch as a boat releases dye into the river. The Chicago Journeymen Plumbers Union Local 130 has historically sponsored the river dyeing and knows the secret to the dye mix. Since 1966, the dye used has been a vegetable-based dye to ensure it isn't adding pollutants to the river. This tradition inspired the White House tradition begun in 2009 to dye the waters of its public fountains green for the holiday.

In 2004, the Northwest Side Irish Parade held its inaugural event in the city's Norwood Park neighborhood, an area with a high proportion of Irish Americans. The parade features over one hundred groups, pipe bands, labor unions, high school bands, Irish dancers, an after party, and over two thousand parade participants.

==== South Side Irish Parade ====
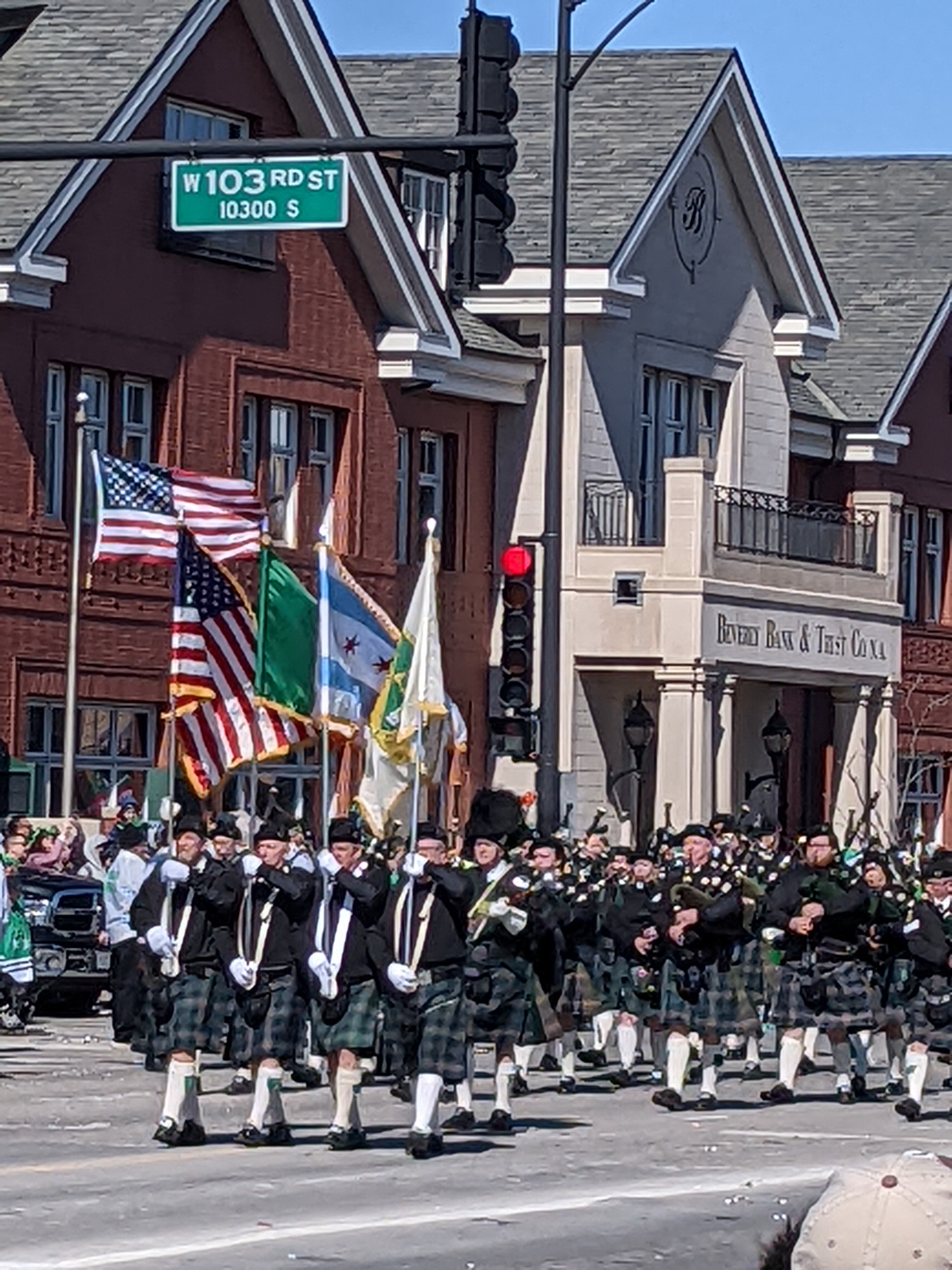
Color guard and pipers marching in Chicago's South Side Irish parade

Although the Irish are present throughout the city of Chicago, the South Side neighborhoods of Beverly, Bridgeport, Morgan Park, and Mount Greenwood, along with the adjacent suburbs of Blue Island, Alsip, Merrionette Park, and Oak Lawn, have historically had large Irish-Catholic populations and comprise the ethnic enclave known as the "South Side Irish." Members of the community have long had an influential role in the politics and economy of the city. The area's heritage is celebrated in song (South Side Irish by Terry McEldowney) and in the annual South Side Irish parade. This parade has been more closely associated with people of Irish heritage than the downtown celebration, with has become a popular activity attended by people of all backgrounds. It features traditional Irish dancers, as well as various businesses and organisations from around the city. This parade has been scaled back in recent years as the Saint Patrick's Day committee announced that it was becoming too large for the community to handle. In 2010, the South Side Parade was suspended. Due in part to pressure from community businesses—particularly pubs and package goods stores—as well as local churches on the city, the parade was reinstated in 2012. Of the various St. Patrick's Day parades in Chicago, the South Side parade has taken steps over the years to keep things family friendly and currently has a zero tolerance policy for public alcohol consumption while attending the parade. The 2020 and 2021 parades were canceled due to the COVID-19 pandemic. The parade resumed in March 2022.

The Chicago White Sox baseball team, who play at Rate Field on the South Side, feature their annual "Halfway to Saint Patrick's Day" each September, when the team wears white jerseys with green pinstripes and caps, in lieu of the usual black.

=== Cleveland, Ohio ===
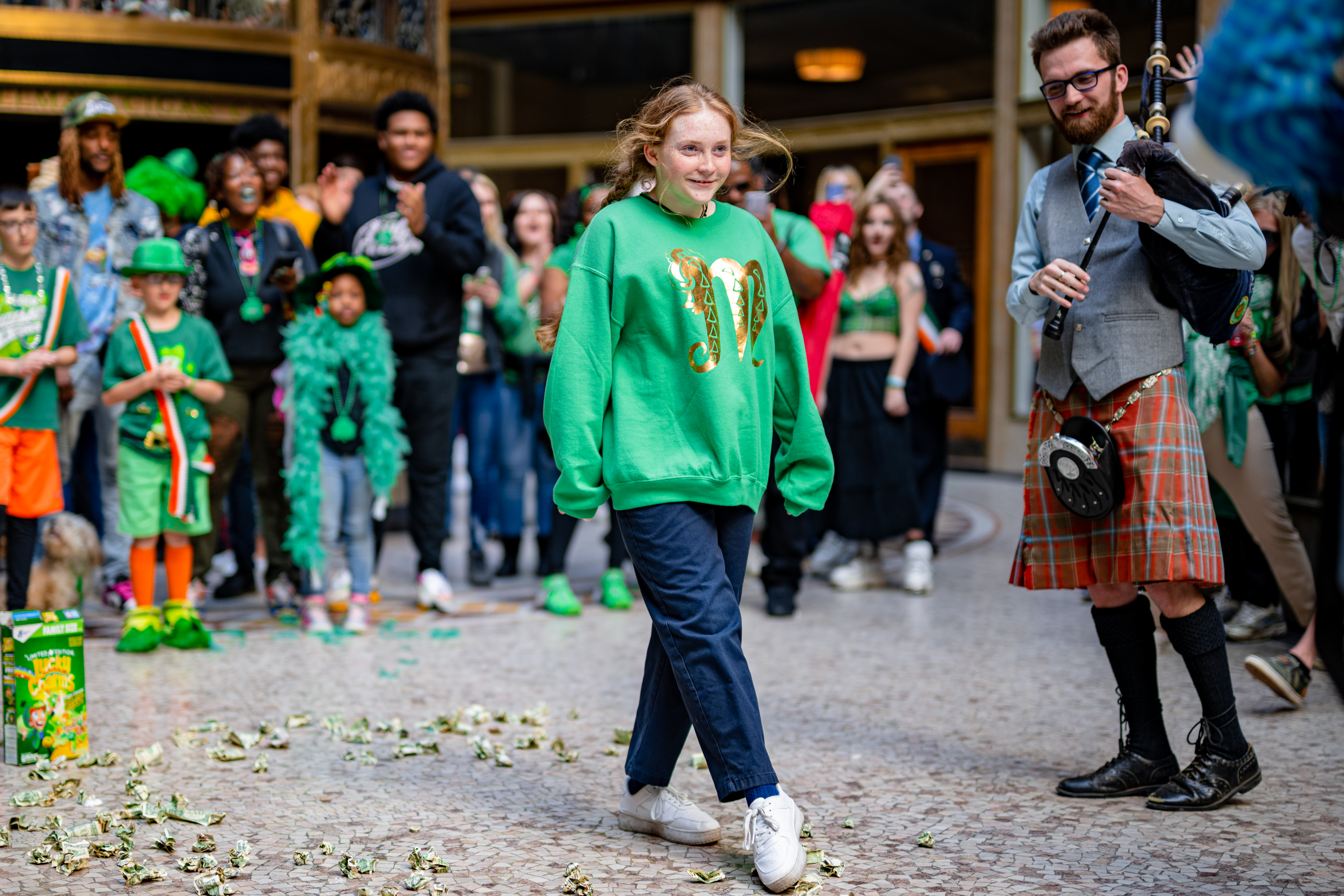
An Irish stepdancer accompanied by a bagpiper at the Cleveland Arcade, 2022

As Ohio's largest and oldest St. Patrick's Day celebration, Cleveland has honored its Irish heritage with an annual Saint Patrick's Day parade first begun in 1842. The parade always occurs on March 17, no matter the day of the week. Originally held in the city's nearby westside neighborhoods, where a higher percentage of the population was of Irish descent, the parade route today runs along Superior Avenue, downtown, from East 18th Street to Public Square.

In recent years, over 15,000 registered participants march in the parade and display their floats in front of hundreds of thousands of spectators. Downtown Cleveland attendance attracts as many as 500,000 people.

As part of the parade ceremonies, a Grand Marshal is annually chosen to preside over the procession. This is an honorary title given to a man "usually in his senior years, who has contributed significantly to the advancement of the Irish Activities in Cleveland." This recognition has been part of the parade since 1935, while "Mother of the Year" was established as a distinguished position since 1963.

No parade was held in 1862–1865 (due to the American Civil War), 1917–18 (Due to the First World War), 1942–1945 (due to the Second World War) nor 2020–21 (due to the COVID-19 pandemic).

=== Columbia, South Carolina ===
Each year Saint Patrick's in Five Points welcomes over 40,000 people living the luck of the Irish and celebrating all things Gaelic. Continually growing and improving, the festival includes a 10K and 5K run, a fun-filled parade, family entertainment, Irish food and craft offerings, child attraction, the Pot O' Gold Playland, a swinging shag dance exhibition and DJ throwdown, as well as five outdoor stages with live music hosting over 25 musical acts.

=== Dallas, Texas ===
The city of Dallas, Texas has held a Saint Patrick's Day parade since 1979 down Greenville Avenue. It is the largest celebration in the city. It was almost canceled in 2012 due to rising costs, but was saved by local resident billionaire Mark Cuban. Like many other cities, 2020 saw their parade get cancelled.

=== Denver, Colorado ===
Denver's first St. Patrick's Day parade was started in 1889, and has been happening on and off since then with the latest iteration going strong since 1962.

=== Detroit, Michigan ===
St. Patrick's Day was first formally celebrated in Detroit in 1808. The current parade, sponsored by the United Irish Societies, began in 1959. It is held in Detroit's Corktown neighborhood, named after its Irish residents who primarily immigrated from County Cork.

=== Dublin, California ===
The annual Saint Patrick's Day celebration in Dublin, California includes a 5K Fun Run and Walk, a pancake breakfast, a festival, and a parade. The parade is popular with residents and visitors from outside Dublin alike, and has been growing in popularity each year. It is sponsored by the Dublin Host Lions Club and features bands and colorful floats. The Dublin firefighters sponsor the pancake breakfast, and tours of the firehouse are popular with children. The festival continues all weekend, and features food, games, kiddie rides, arts & crafts, and information about local organizations. The festival had been held near the end of the parade route in Shamrock Village on Amador Valley Blvd., but was relocated to the Civic Center on Dublin Blvd., in 2007, moving it closer to the growing population in the eastern part of Dublin.

=== Enterprise, Alabama ===
The "World's Smallest Saint Patrick's Day Parade" occurs in Enterprise, Alabama, each year. A person of Irish descent, generally dressed in festive garb and carrying a large Irish flag, is the only person in the parade. the parader walks one block from the courthouse to the Boll Weevil Monument and back to the courthouse. The parade is reported by local and national news.

=== Hoboken, New Jersey ===
The New Jersey city of Hoboken has held an annual Saint Patrick's Day parade since 1986. The parade takes place at 1 pm and marches down Washington Street from 14th Street to 1st Street.

Over the years, there has been much controversy surrounding the public intoxication during this event. The city has issued a zero tolerance policy, and has been enacting $2,000 minimum fines for any alcohol-related offence.

=== Holyoke, Massachusetts ===
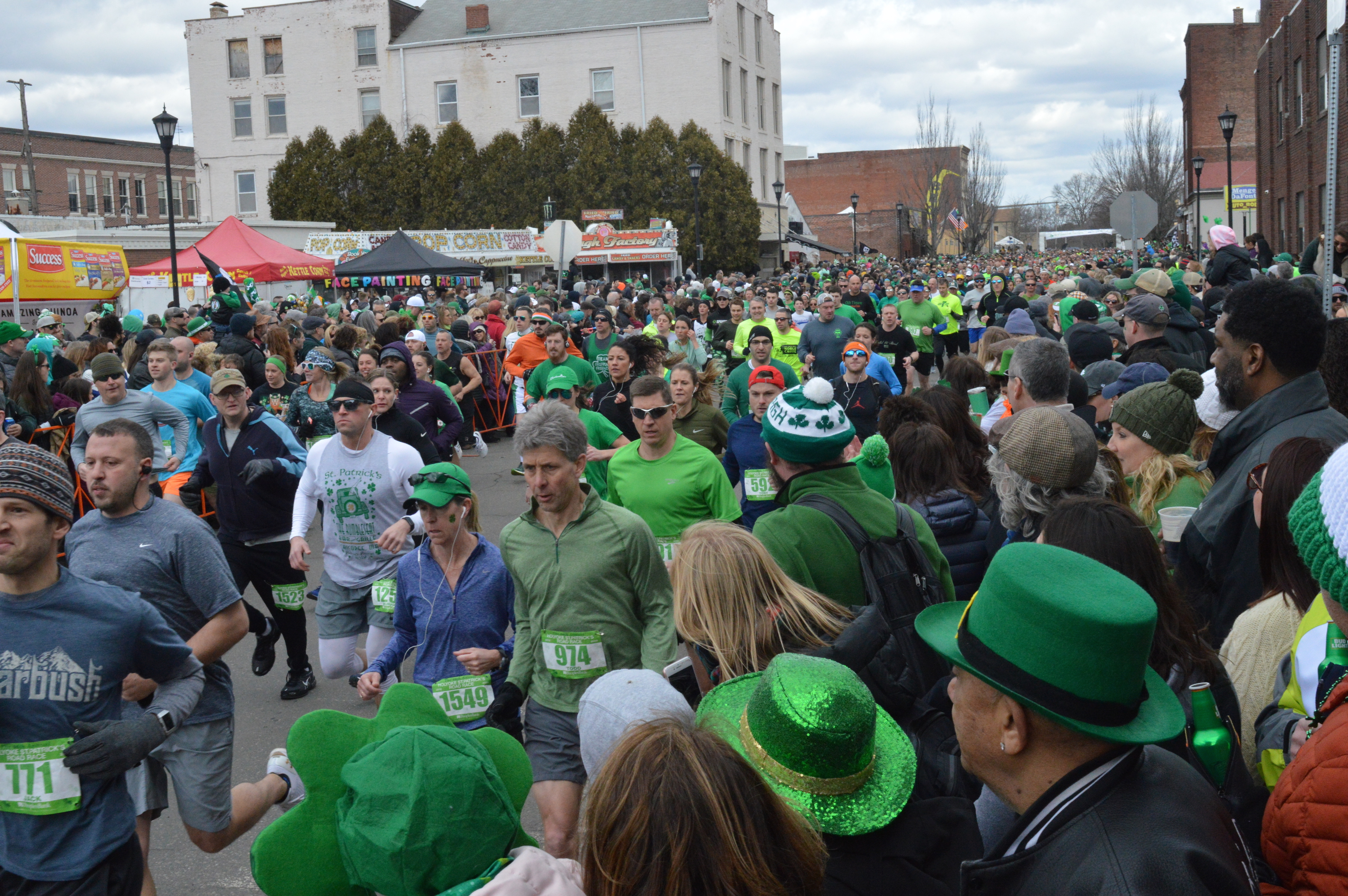
A wave of runners in the Holyoke St. Patrick's Day Road Race pass the starting line.

This western Massachusetts factory town was the site of massive Irish immigration in the 19th century and hosts a parade its organizers claim is the second largest in the United States. It is scheduled on the Sunday following Saint Patrick's Day each year. Attendance exceeds 300,000, with over 25,000 marchers through a 2.3-mile route in the city of 40,000. A 10K road race and many events create a remarkable festival weekend. Each year an Irish-American who has distinguished himself or herself in his or her chosen profession is awarded the John F. Kennedy National Award. JFK was a National Award Winner in the 1958 Holyoke Parade. Other winners include author Tom Clancy, Homeland Security Director Tom Ridge, and actor Pat O'Brien.

=== Hot Springs, Arkansas ===
The Hot Springs, Arkansas, parade is among world's shortest and is held annually on historic Bridge Street, designated "The Shortest Street in the World" in the 1940s by Ripley's Believe It or Not. The street is 98 feet long, making it suitable for the shortest Saint Patrick's Day parade in the world.

=== Jackson, Mississippi ===
Hal's St. Paddy's Parade in downtown Jackson started in 1983 and has grown each year. The parade is the brainchild of Jackson entrepreneur Malcolm White, who later was the executive director of the Mississippi Arts Commission. For years, a highlight of the parade was the Sweet Potato Queens, who started a separate parade in 2011 because their ranks of marchers had grown too numerous.

=== Las Vegas, Nevada ===
The Southern Nevada (formerly Las Vegas) Sons and Daughters of Erin have put on a parade since 1966. It was formerly held on Fremont Street in downtown Las Vegas, later moved to 4th Street. Since 2005, the parade has been held in downtown Henderson. It is the biggest parade in the state of Nevada with over 100 entries. The celebration includes a three-day festival, carnival and classic car show in Old Town Henderson.

=== Maryville, Missouri ===
Maryville, Missouri, home of Northwest Missouri State University, annually holds a parade sponsored by The Palms Bar and Grill that has been recognised by the Guinness Book of World Records as the shortest Saint Patrick's Day parade. It runs approximately 1/2 of a block.

=== New Orleans ===
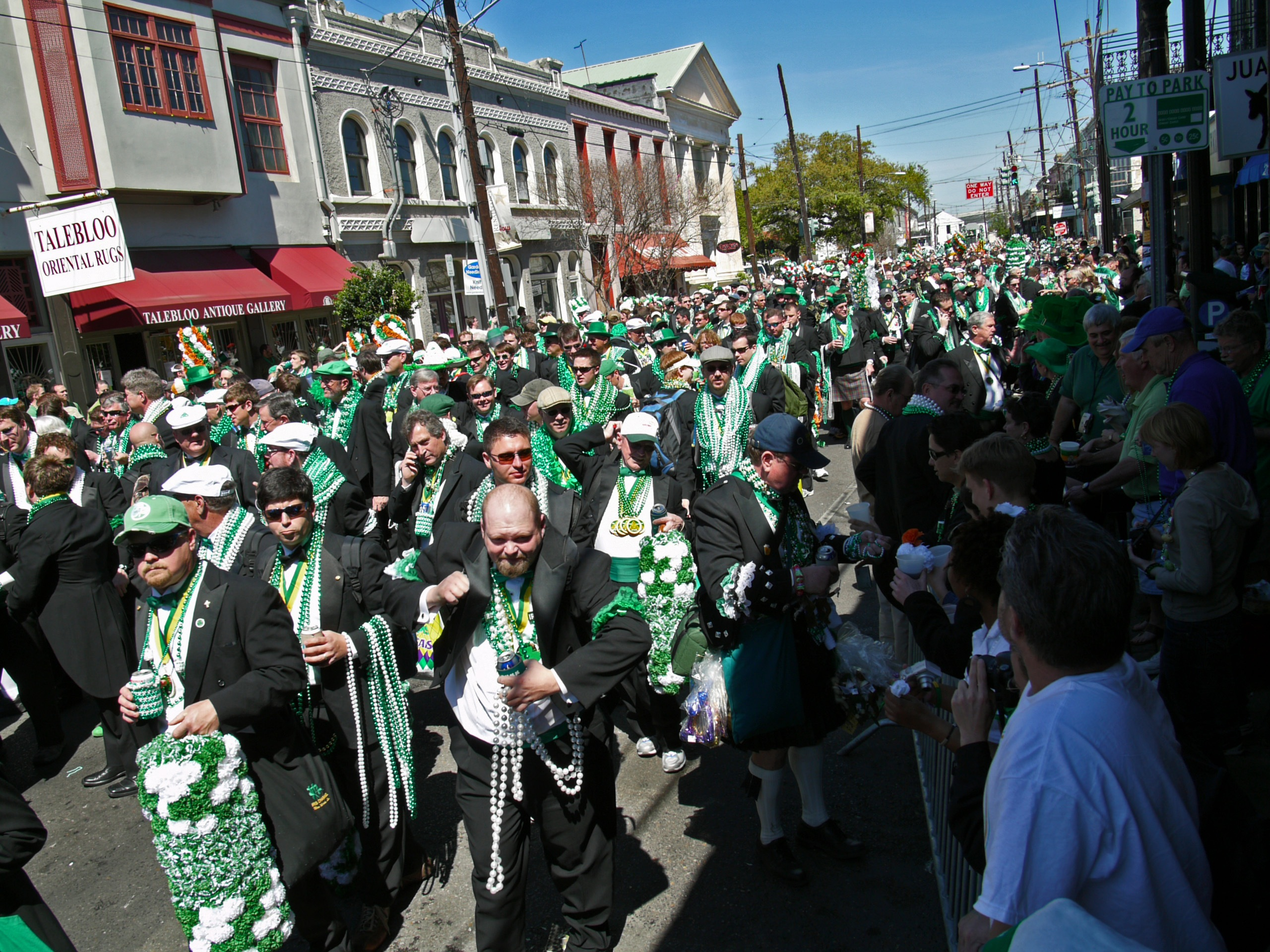
Saint Patrick's Day parade on lower Magazine Street, New Orleans

Historically the largest entry port for Irish immigrants in the US South, New Orleans has maintained a large population of Irish heritage. The earliest record of Saint Patrick's Day celebrations in the city is 1809. Saint Patrick's Day traditions going back to the 19th century continue, including multiple block parties and parades.

The New Orleans parades are mostly based around neighborhood and community organizations. Major parades include the Irish Channel parade, the Downtown Irish Parade starting in the Bywater neighborhood, multiple parades in the French Quarter, and a combined Irish-Italian Parade celebrating both Saint Patrick's Day and Saint Joseph's Day. As with many parades in New Orleans, the influence of Mardi Gras is apparent, with some of the floats being reused from local Carnival parades, and beads and trinkets being thrown to those along the parade route. New Orleans Saint Patrick's Day parades are also famous for throwing onions, carrots, cabbages, potatoes, and other ingredients for making an Irish stew.

Various suburbs and surrounding communities also hold celebrations, including parades in Metairie, Slidell, and an Irish Italian Isleño Parade in Chalmette.

=== New York City ===
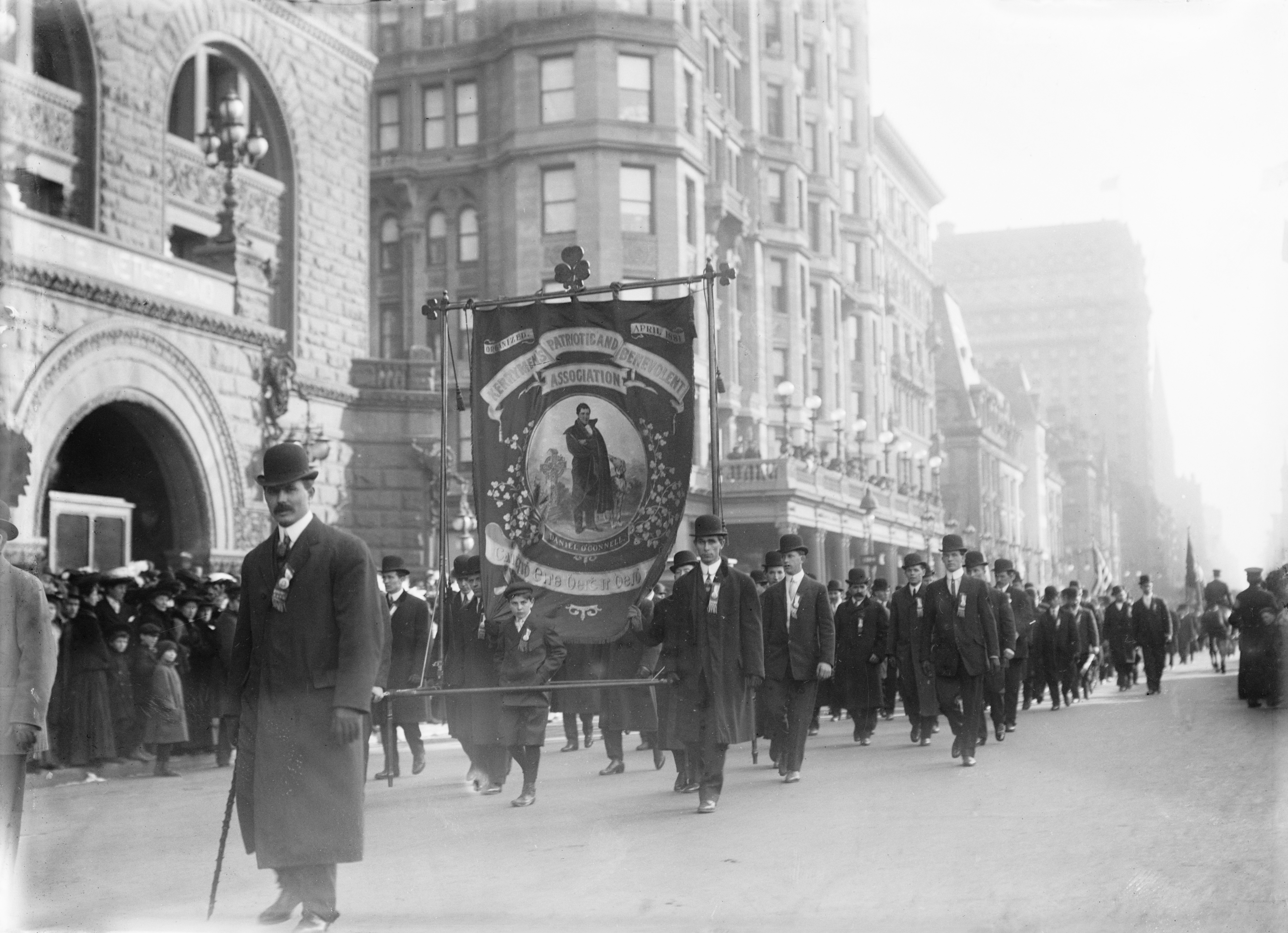
Saint Patrick's Parade on Fifth Avenue, 1909

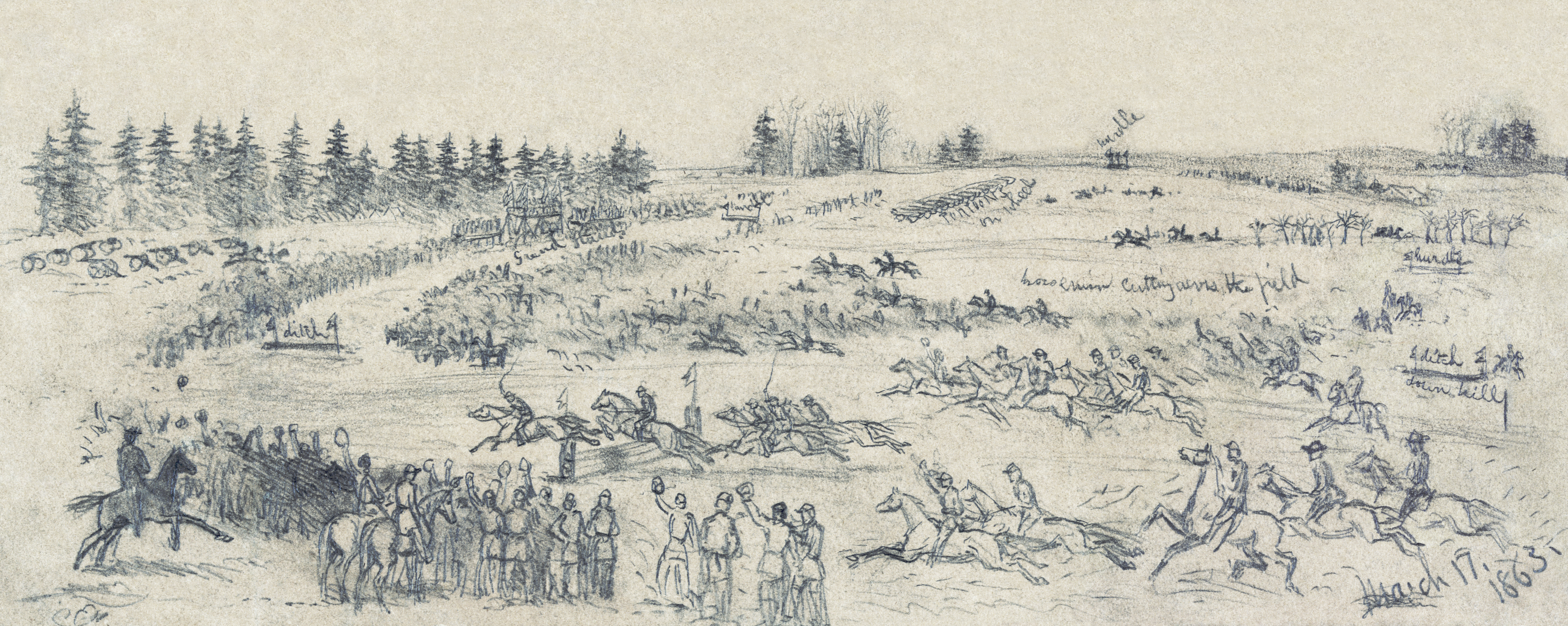
Saint Patrick's Day celebration, Union Army. Irish Brigade holds a steeplechase race, 17 March 1863.

The New York City St. Patrick's Day Parade not only has become the largest Saint Patrick's Day parade in the world but is also one of the oldest civilian parades in the world. In a typical year, 150,000 marchers participate in it, including bands, firefighters, military and police groups, county associations, emigrant societies and social and cultural clubs with two million spectators line the streets. The parade marches up the 1.5-mile route along 5th Avenue in Manhattan between 44th Street and 79th Street, is a five-hour procession, and is always led by the 69th Infantry Regiment (New York). The commissioner of the parade always asks the commanding officer if the 69th is ready, to which the response is, "The 69th is always ready." New York politicians—or those running for office—are always found prominently marching in the parade. Former New York City Mayor Ed Koch (who was of Jewish ethnicity) once proclaimed himself "Ed O'Koch" for the day, and he continued to don an Irish sweater and march every year up until 2003, even though he was no longer in office.

For many years the parade banned gay groups, saying groups could not display banners identifying their sexuality. On September 3, 2014, the organizers of the parade announced a decision to lift the ban on gay groups, saying they preferred to keep the parade non-political and the ban was having the opposite effect. In 2015 OUT@NBCUniversal, an organization of gay employees of NBCUniversal, became the first gay group to march in the parade. Since 1948, a banner reading "England get out of Ireland" has been carried at the parade as the only political banner allowed. The banner has caused controversy when members of the Police Service of Northern Ireland and Sinn Féin leader Mary Lou McDonald were photographed near it.

In 1989 Dorothy Hayden Cudahy became the first female Grand Marshal of the New York City Saint Patrick's Day Parade; in 1984 she had become the first woman, as well as the first American-born person, to be elected president of the County Kilkenny Association.

The first St. Patrick Parade in NYC was held in 1762 by the constantly increasing Irish community of the city. They say, it was the first recorded St. Patrick's Parade in the world. With the growth of Irish community in the US, parade traditions spread to other American cities.

The New York parade is moved to the previous Saturday (16 March) in years where 17 March is a Sunday. The event also has been moved on the rare occasions when, due to Easter's falling on a very early date, 17 March would land in Holy Week. This same scenario arose again in 2008, when Easter fell on 23 March, but the festivities occurred on their normal date and were enjoyed by a record number of viewers. In many other American cities (such as Philadelphia), the parade is always held on the Sunday before 17 March, regardless of the liturgical calendar. Mayor Bill de Blasio expressed "real concerns" about the 2020 parade due to the COVID-19 pandemic and the parade has been on hiatus since that year; several other cities canceled their parades.

The parade can be watched live on NBC Channel 4 New York (WNBC).

Besides the parade, there are several other St. Patrick-themed events taking place around the city from stand-up comedy shows to dance parties and concerts.

=== Omaha, Nebraska ===
Omaha's "Stockyards" opened in 1883 and was once considered the largest livestock market in the world. This led to many ethnic groups' settling in the surrounded area, one of which is Irish. The Irish were the third largest ethnic group in South Omaha in the 20th century. Today the Ancient Order of Hibernians (AOH) Sarpy County Division's St. Patrick's Day Parade has more than 130 entries and lasts more than 90 minutes as it snakes through downtown and the Old Market.

=== Pearl River, New York ===
Pearl River attracts a crowd of 100,000 or even more people, making it the second largest parade in New York state behind the New York City Parade. The Pearl River parade is also in the top 10 in the country. The parade started in 1963.

=== Peoria, Illinois ===
The St. Patrick Society sponsors a St. Patrick's Day Parade and Party on March 17 of each year. The Parade participants march along the designated parade route through downtown Peoria. Awards are presented in the following parade categories: Business Entries, Family Entries, and Organizational Entries. The Parade route ends near the designated site of the family-focused St. Patrick's Day Party where families (Irish Clans) meet and enjoy Irish Music, Irish Dance and Irish refreshments.

=== Pittsburgh, Pennsylvania ===
St. Patrick's Day in Pittsburgh is consistently ranked as one of the biggest and best St. Patrick's Day celebrations in the United States. The parade in Pittsburgh dates back to 1869 and continues to draw record numbers of people out to celebrate as over 23,000 march in the parade which attracts almost 500,000 out to party. The city basically shuts down for the day to celebrate as the downtown area and many of the cities bridges and tunnels are filled with patrons heading out for the day's festivities. Pittsburgh also has one of the highest percentage of its population that identifies as Irish (over 13.5%) of any city in the U.S.

=== Philadelphia, Pennsylvania ===
One of the largest in the nation, the St. Patrick's Day parade in Philadelphia is held on the Sunday before every St. Patrick's Day, and began there in 1771. Prior to the first parade, the Irish were already celebrating St. Patrick's Day in Philadelphia. Before the American republic was founded, Irishmen came together in 1771 to pay honor to Ireland's patron as founding members of the Society of the Friendly Sons of St. Patrick for the relief of Emigrants from Ireland. George Washington, who has encouraged the many Irish soldiers under his command during the American Revolution to fete St. Patrick's Day, was an honorary member of this society. The designation of March 17 as a day of special observance was a very early Philadelphia custom.

In 2013, the parade included about 20,000 participants in more than 150 groups. Participants included marching bands, youth groups, music dance groups, Irish associations, float riders and operators, and flag carriers. After years of being on the Benjamin Franklin Parkway in Central Philadelphia, the 2017 parade route started at John F. Kennedy Boulevard and 16th Street. It then continues its approach to Philadelphia City Hall, goes down 15th Street around City Hall to approach Market Street. It then goes down Market past Independence Hall and reaches its conclusion at Penn's Landing. In 2025, the parade returned to its older route along the Parkway.

All parades in 2020-21 went on hiatus due to concerns about the coronavirus outbreak.

=== Providence, Rhode Island ===
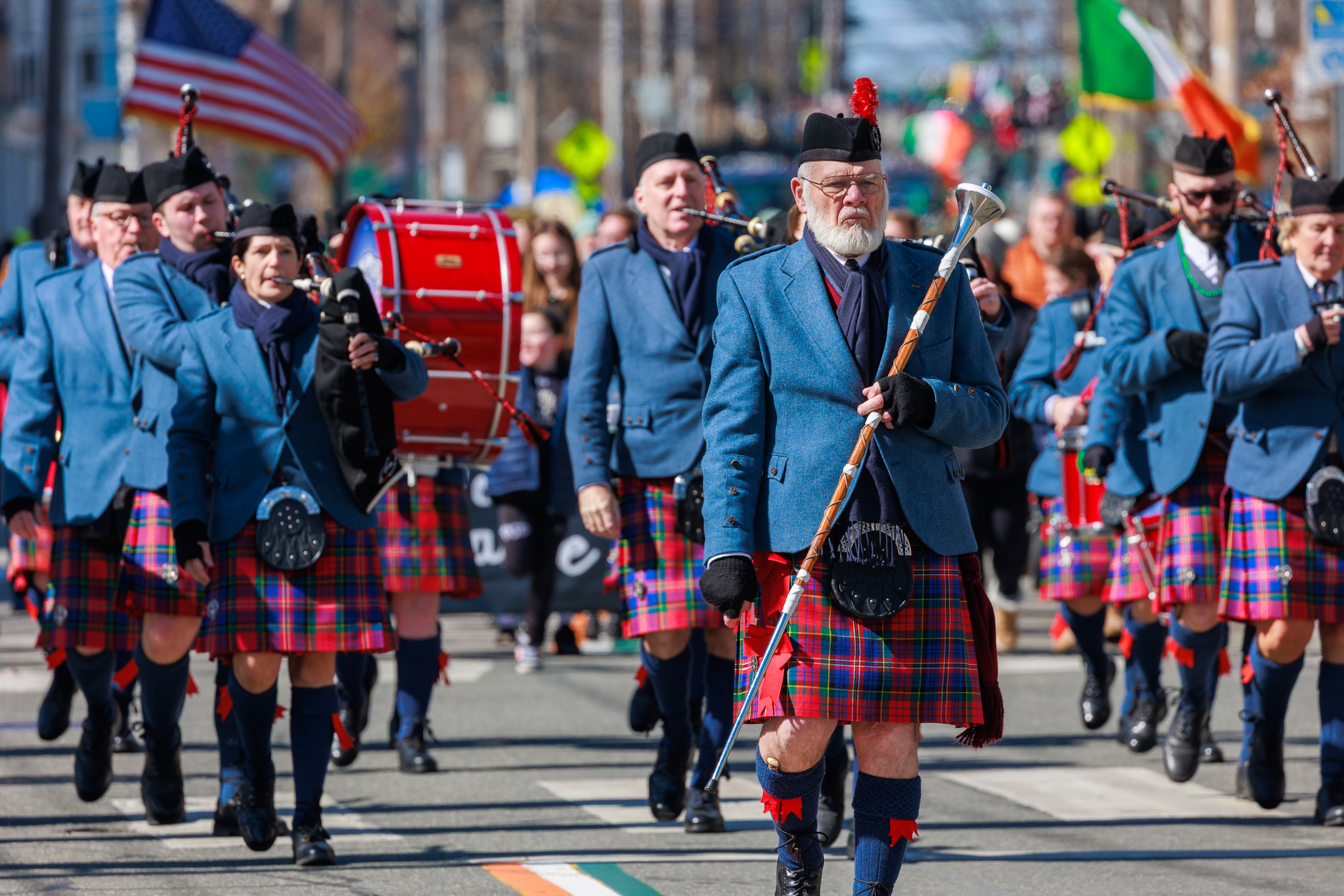
Rhode Island Highlanders Pipe Band in 2025's parade

Providence's Irish population was around 1,500 in 1839. At that time, Saint Patrick's Day was observed with a banquet at City Hotel, on Broad Street. The first public St. Patrick's Day parade in Providence was held in 1852. Parades have been held "pretty regularly" ever since, with periodic interruptions due to economic depressions, the Civil War, and World War I. The 1919 parade was particularly large, with over seven thousand Irish men and women participating to support the cause of Irish Self-Determination.

=== Quad Cities, Illinois and Iowa ===
An Irish population in this cluster of Midwestern cities hosts an St. Patrick's Day parade. It is "the only bi-state St. Patrick's Day Parade in the USA", according to the St. Patrick's Day Society of the Quad Cities, crossing the Centennial Bridge from Rock Island, Illinois into Davenport, Iowa. Being so close to Chicago, this parade still gathers around 200,000 annually on its historical parade route. Some travel experts have labeled it as one of the top St. Patrick's Day parades in North America. Much of this is due to the unique nature and small town hospitality you get in the Quad Cities. The whole area combined is a population of around 350,000, with Davenport being the largest city at just under 100,000.

=== Rolla, Missouri ===
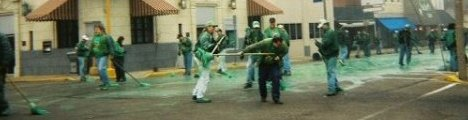
Saint Patrick's Board Alumni paint Pine Street green

Rolla is home to the Missouri University of Science & Technology (formerly known as University of Missouri-Rolla, and Missouri School of Mines), an engineering college. Inasmuch as Saint Patrick is the patron saint of engineers, the school and town's celebrations start ten days before Saint Patrick's Day, with a downtown parade held the Saturday before Saint Patrick's. A royal court is crowned, and the streets in the city's downtown area are painted solid green. Each year's celebrations are said to be "The Best Ever." In 2008, Rolla celebrated its "100th Annual Best Ever Saint Patrick's Day 2008" celebration.

In previous years, a pit of green liquid was made by students as part of the festivities, and named 'Alice'--stepping into Alice was a rite of bravery. In recent years the university faculty has banned the practice out of health concerns.

=== San Diego, California ===
San Diego's 2015 St. Patrick's Day Parade and Festival is the 35th Anniversary of the largest St. Patrick's Day Parade west of the Mississippi. Lasting two hours and featuring over 120 entries, the theme for the day is "Celebrating Faith and Freedom" as designated by the Irish Congress of Southern California (ICSC). Enjoyed by more than 30,000, the St. Patrick's Day Parade and Festival includes three performance stages, a Kid's Zone, a Celtic Village, dozens of crafts and food booths, two beer gardens hosted by Guinness. Held in Balboa Park, the event was founded by James Foley who had helped organize the St. Patrick's Day Parade in Hartford, Connecticut before he and his wife, Pat, moved to San Diego to open the Blarney Stone Pub.

There's been no parade in 2020-21, in line with many cities.

=== San Francisco, California ===
There has been a Saint Patrick's Day celebration in San Francisco since 1852. San Francisco has always had a large Irish American population and for many decades Irish Americans were the largest ethnic group in San Francisco. However, as of the early 21st century, the largest ethnic group in San Francisco is Chinese Americans and most of the Irish Americans have moved to the suburban parts of the San Francisco Bay Area. Each year, however, Irish from all over the San Francisco Bay Area come into San Francisco to march in or to see the Saint Patrick's Day parade march down Market Street, held the Sunday before Saint Patrick's Day. Numerous people from all ethnic groups can be seen wearing green in San Francisco on Saint Patrick's Day.

In March 2019, the United Irish Society nominated recently deceased Sinn Féin politician Martin McGuinness as honorary marshal in the parade. This was criticized because McGuinness was a former IRA member.

=== St. Louis, Missouri ===
The first Saint Patrick's Day celebration in St. Louis took place on March 17, 1820. In 1969, Joseph B. McGlynn Jr. initiated a Saint Patrick's Day Parade in downtown St. Louis. The second year of the parade, the Irish Prime Minister Jack Lynch marched in the parade and called it "very impressive." March 2020 was to mark both the Bicentennial of Saint Patrick's Celebrations in St. Louis and the 51st Saint Patrick's Day Run and Parade. This was officially to be held on 14 March 2020 with the Grand Marshal being St. Louis Fire Chief Dennis Jenkerson. 2020 dignitaries include Irish Senator Aidan Davitt, Kevin Short Managing Partner and CEO of Clayton Capital Partners, and Brigadier General Brian R. Bisacre, Commander of US Military Police Corps. Unfortunately, the celebration has been on hiatus since that year.

=== Savannah, Georgia ===
One of the largest parades is held in Savannah, Georgia, focused on Emmet Park, named after the Irish orator Robert Emmet. The parade held in Savannah is the largest in Georgia. Many Irish settled in Savannah even in the earliest years since those freed from debtors' prison were invited to join General James Oglethorpe's fledgling colony. There is a Mass at the Cathedral Basilica of Saint John the Baptist prior to the parade. In the early 1960s, there was an attempt to dye the Savannah River green, but all it produced was an irregular green stripe in the middle of the river. In 2006, the Tánaiste was featured in the parade. The parade travels through Savannah's Historic District.

Some confusion exists about the year of the first Saint Patrick's Day parade in Savannah. There is some evidence that a private parade was held by "an unidentified group" referred to as "Fencibles" on 17 March 1813. Another source states that the first St. Patrick's Day celebration in Savannah was held in 1818. However, it is generally accepted that the first publicly held Saint Patrick's Day procession was in 1824, organized by the Hibernian Society.

The 2012 Parade included over 360 participants making it the largest parade in the history of the City of Savannah. Organizers say that the 2012 crowd was well over a million people.

No parades were held from 1861 to 1865, 1917 to 1918, 1942 to 1945, and 2020 to 2021.

=== Scranton, Pennsylvania ===
Due to the rich history of Scranton participation in Saint Patrick's Day festivities it is one of the oldest parades in the United States. It has been going on annually since 1862 by the Saint Patrick's Day Parade Association of Lackawanna County. The parade route begins on Wyoming Avenue and loops up to Penn Avenue and then Lackawanna Avenue before going back down over Jefferson Avenue to get to Washington Avenue. Since 1962 the St. Patrick's Parade Day Association of Lackawanna County, Pennsylvania, has conducted this parade the weekend before the feast of St. Patrick.

=== Seattle, Washington ===
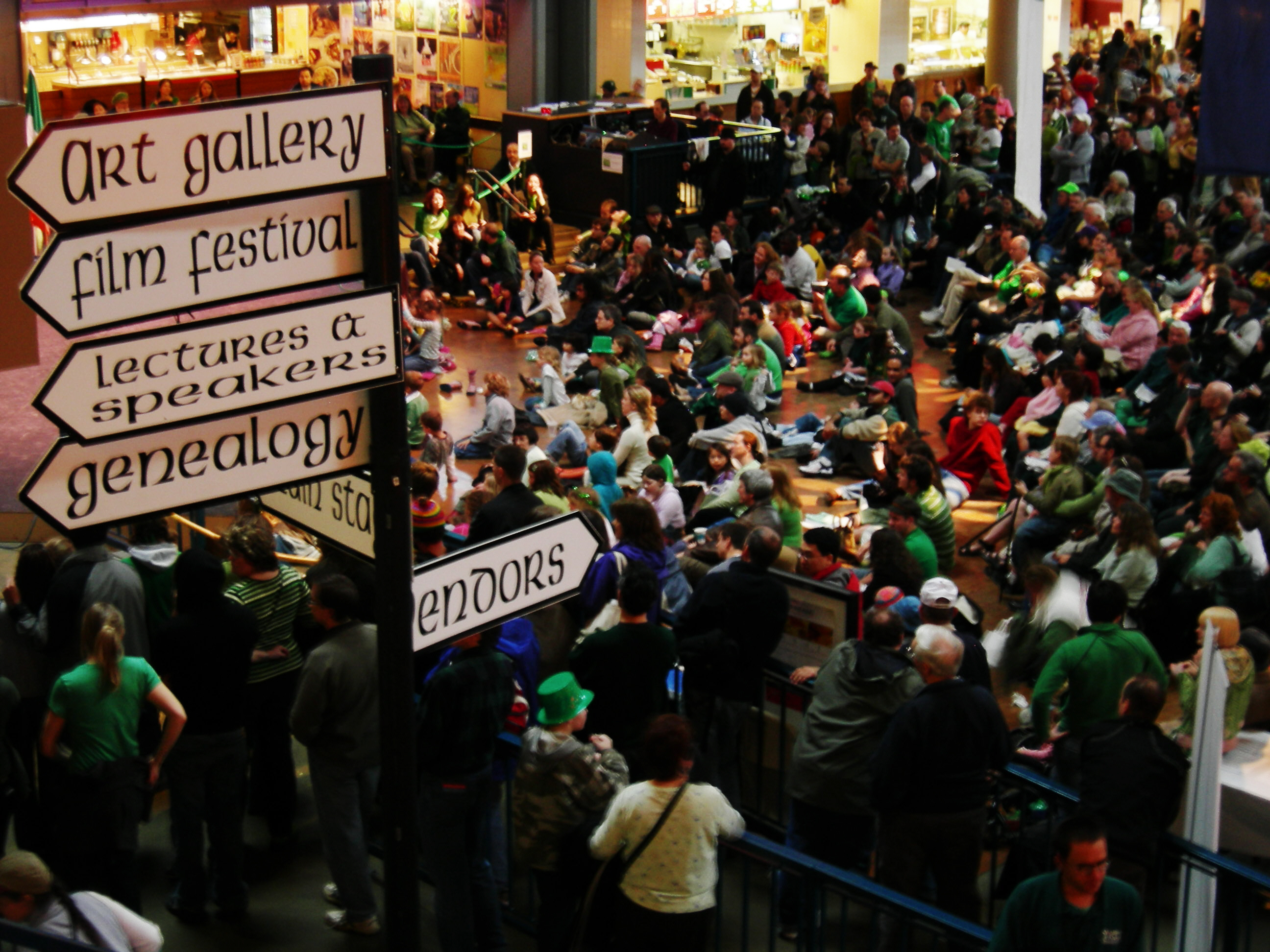
Seattle's Festál Irish Festival

Seattle Washington's Saint Patrick's Day Parade, recognized by CNN in 2009 as one of the "Five places to get your green on" in America, travels along a 1-mile route through the Emerald City's downtown financial and retail core the Saturday before Saint Patrick's Day. Seattle's Saint Patrick's Day Celebration is the largest and oldest in the Northwestern United States. In 2009, some 20,000 spectators and groups from throughout the Northwest turned out for the city's Irish shenanigans. Along with the annual "Laying 'O the Green" where Irish revellers mark the path of the next morning's procession with a mile-long green stripe, the Seattle parade marks the high-point of Seattle's Irish Week festivities. The week-long civic celebration organized by the city's Irish Heritage Club Irish Heritage Club Seattle includes the annual Society of the Friends of Saint Patrick Dinner where a century-old Irish Shillelagh has been passed to the group's new president for 70 years, an Irish Soda Bread Baking Contest, a Mass for Peace that brings together Catholics and others in a Protestant church, and the annual Irish Week Festival, which takes place around Saint Patrick's Day is enormous, including step dancing, food, historical and modern exhibitions, and Irish lessons. Many celebrities of Irish descent visit Seattle during its Saint Patrick's Day Celebration. In 2010 The Right Honorable Desmond Guinness, a direct descendant of Guinness Brewery founder Arthur Guinness, will serve as the parade's grand marshal. In 2009, The Tonight Show's Conan O'Brien made a guest appearance at the annual Mayor's Proclamation Luncheon at local Irish haunt F.X. McCrory's. And in 2008, European Union Ambassador to the US and former Irish Prime Minister John Bruton served as the parade's grand marshal and marched alongside Tom Costello, the mayor of Galway, Seattle's Irish sister city. Spokane, in eastern Washington, also hosts a Saint Patrick's Day Parade.

The 2020 parade was canceled due to concerns about the coronavirus outbreak.

=== Syracuse, New York ===
In the city of Syracuse, NY, Saint Patrick's celebrations are traditionally begun with the delivery of green beer to Coleman's Irish Pub on the last Sunday of February. Coleman's is located in the Tipperary Hill section of the city. Tipperary Hill is home to the World-famous "Green-on-Top" Traffic Light and is historically the Irish section in Syracuse. Saint Patrick's Day is rung in at midnight with the painting of a Shamrock under the Green-Over-Red traffic light. Syracuse boasts the largest Saint Patrick's Day celebration per-capita in the United States with their annual Syracuse Saint Patrick's Parade, founded by Nancy Duffy, an honoured journalist in the Central New York area and an active community leader, and Daniel F. Casey, a local Irishman and businessman. "The parade remains a major annual event, typically drawing an estimated crowd of more than 100,000 visitors to downtown Syracuse, as well as 5,000 to 6,000 marchers."

=== Tallahassee, Florida ===
The Tallahassee Irish Society has been hosting an annual Saint Patrick's Day event in Tallahassee since 1999. In 2010, along with the City of Tallahassee, the first annual Saint Patrick's Day parade and Downtown Get Down is being hosted along Adams Street.

=== Tampa, Florida ===
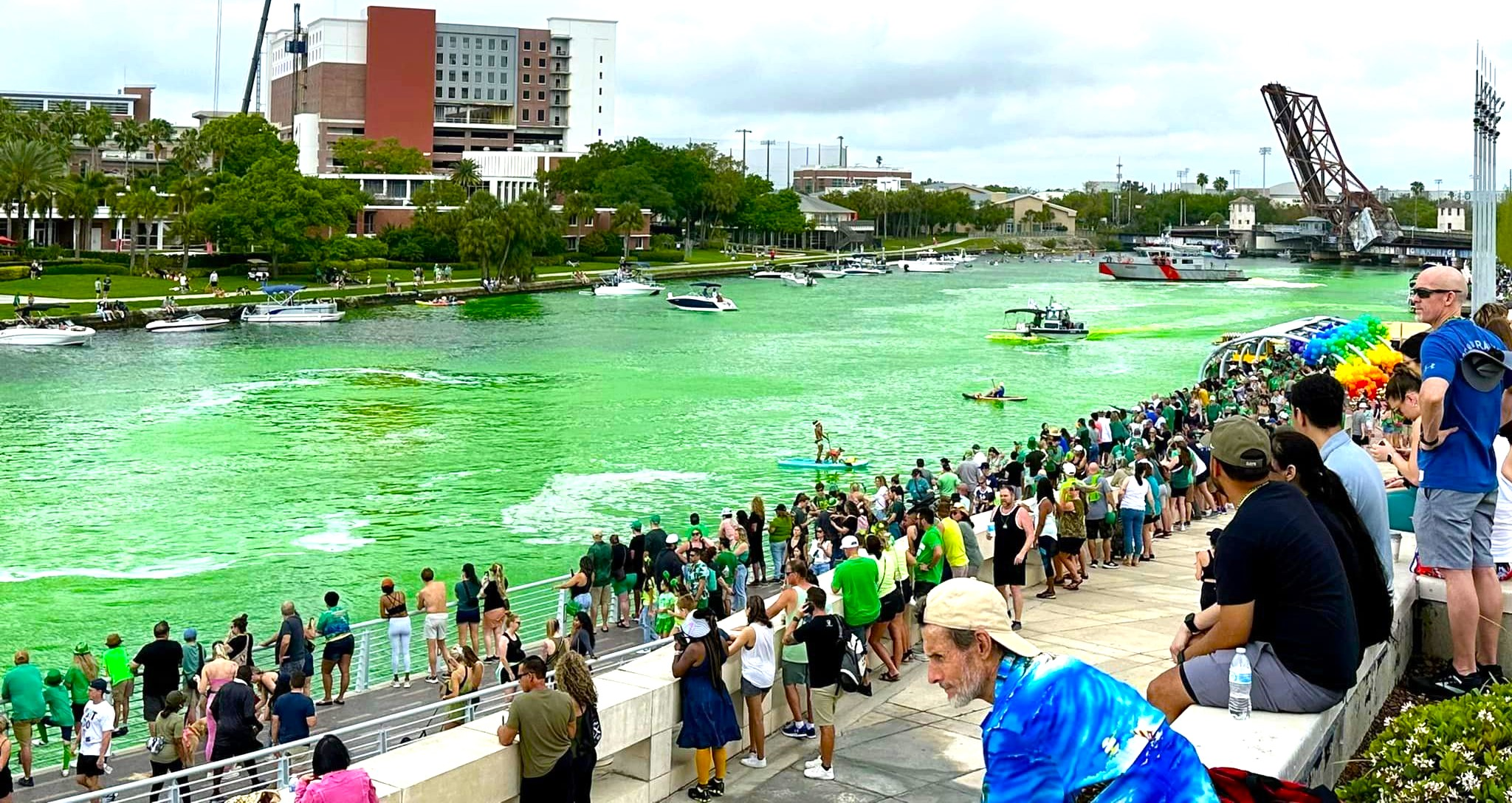
The Tampa Riverwalk during the River O'Green Fest, 2024

The Tampa Rough Riders, one of the krewes that also participate in the city's annual Gasparilla Pirate Festival, have organized a St. Patrick's Day Parade in the historic neighborhood of Ybor City since 1977. Since 2012, the city has also hosted the Mayor's River O'Green Fest on the Saturday closest to St. Patrick's Day. During the event, the Hillsborough River through downtown is dyed green and various activities and live entertainment take place along the Tampa Riverwalk and Curtis Hixon Waterfront Park.

=== Washington, D.C. ===
A one-day music festival with a parade called National ShamrockFest has been held in Washington, D.C. each year since 2000 in association with Saint Patrick's Day. Approximately 40,000 people attend each year.

The St. Patrick's Parade of Washington, D.C. was first held in 1971. The parade route runs down Constitution Avenue from 7th to 17th Streets, N.W and features marching bands, pipe bands, Irish dance schools, military, police, and fire departments, as well as floats and novelty groups.

In 2017 and 2018 organizers added security measures intended to counter threats similar to the truck attack in Nice, France, in 2016. These steps included blocking off side-streets with large vehicles, like dump trucks, so terrorists could not drive hi-jacked trucks onto the parade route. On January 10, 2019, organizers announced the extra security steps they felt were necessary made the parade too expensive.

The parade was put on hiatus in 2020 due to the COVID-19 pandemic.

=== Worcester, Massachusetts ===
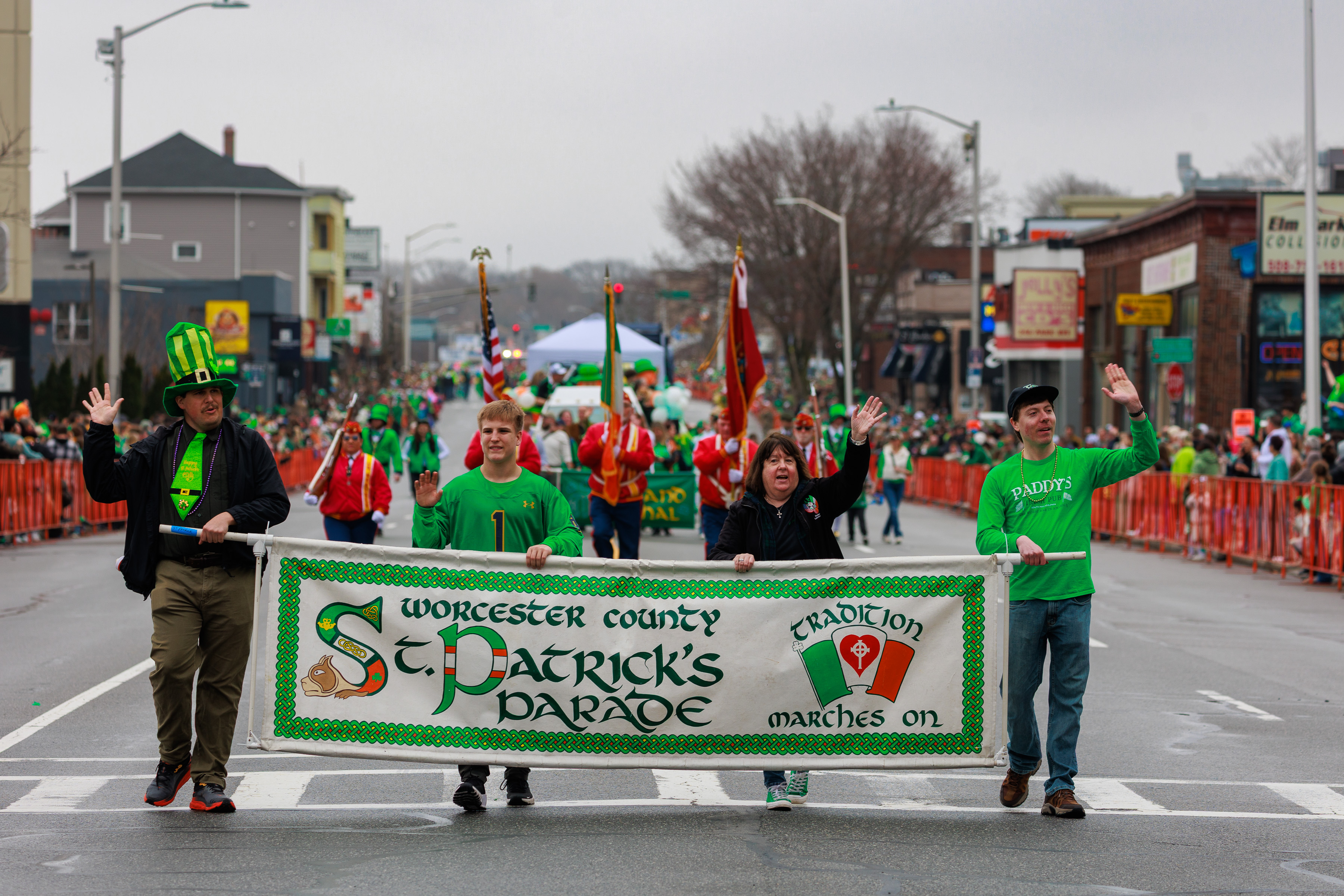
2025 Worceter, MA parade

The Worcester County St. Patrick's Day Parade has been held annually on the Sunday before St. Patrick's Day since 1983. The parade route runs along Park Avenue, beginning at Mill St. and ending at Elm Park. The parade can often see crowds of over 100,000 people.

== Sports ==
=== Baseball ===
Although Major League Baseball is still in its preseason spring training phase when Saint Patrick's Day rolls around, some teams celebrate by wearing holiday-themed uniforms. The Cincinnati Reds were the first team to wear Saint Patrick's Day uniforms in 1978. The Philadelphia Phillies began to wear green uniforms on Saint Patricks Day in 1981 when Phillies pitcher Tug McGraw, who dyed his uniform green the night before March 17, 1981. Along with the Reds and Phillies, many other teams have since started wearing Saint Patrick's day themed jerseys, including the Boston Red Sox in 2004, who were also the second team to wear Saint Patrick's Day hats in 1990; the green uniforms have also been worn twice during the regular season, in 2007 and 2008, as a tribute to the NBA's Boston Celtics, whose primary color is green. Since then it has become a tradition of many sports teams to also wear special uniforms to celebrate the holiday. The Los Angeles Dodgers also have a history with the Irish-American community. With the O'Malley family owning the team and more recently Frank McCourt, the Dodgers have had team celebrations or worn green jerseys on Saint Patrick's Day. The Detroit Tigers and Philadelphia Phillies also wear Saint Patrick's Day caps and jerseys. Other teams celebrate by wearing kelly green hats. These teams include: the Chicago Cubs, the Chicago White Sox, the New York Mets, the San Diego Padres, the Atlanta Braves, the Pittsburgh Pirates, the Kansas City Royals, the Seattle Mariners and the St. Louis Cardinals. The Washington Nationals have fan green hat day on 17 September to represent 6 months to Saint Patrick's Day. The White Sox belatedly celebrate Saint Patrick's Day every second week of September by wearing a variation of their pinstriped home uniforms, featuring green instead of black, as part of their "Halfway to St. Patrick's" promotion.

Nearly all Major League Baseball teams now produce Saint Patrick's Day merchandise, including Kelly green hats, jerseys, and T-shirts.

=== Basketball ===
Four National Basketball Association teams adopt their third jerseys exclusively for Saint Patrick's Day (or Saint Patrick's Day week). During Saint Patrick's Day week, the Boston Celtics, whose road jersey is green, wear their gold/green jerseys, the Chicago Bulls wear their black/green alternate jersey which was introduced in the 2005–06 season, and the Toronto Raptors wear their black/green alternate jerseys which was introduced during the 2007–08 season. During Saint Patrick's Day games, the New York Knicks wore their green/orange alternate, which they adopted in the 2005–06 season, until the 2014–15 season. In the 2009–10 season, they adopted it for both March 17 and Christmas (the league made a conscious effort to schedule games between teams with green uniforms and red uniforms on the holiday). This changed when the league began custom Christmas uniforms in 2011.

The practice is not present in college basketball, due to the holiday being largely overshadowed by Championship Week and the subsequent NCAA Men's Division I Basketball Championship, NIT and lesser tournaments.

=== Ice hockey ===
The New Jersey Devils of the National Hockey League traditionally wear their throwback uniforms, which include green in the color scheme (green was removed from the Devils' uniforms in 1992), on Saint Patrick's Day and did so for their 2010 and 2012 games against the Pittsburgh Penguins. They also wore them, albeit belatedly, on March 18, 2011, against the Washington Capitals; the Devils played a road game on March 17. Although the Devils, Dallas Stars and Minnesota Wild (the last two of which have green in their regular color schemes) are the only U.S.-based teams to wear green on ice, the league has offered a line of holiday-themed gear to its fans in recent years. The Buffalo Sabres also donned green and white Irish-inspired practice jerseys (complete with insular script for the names and captain designations) prior to their March 16, 2014, March 17, 2015, and March 17, 2018, games (the team switched to their regular gold third jerseys prior to the games themselves); the jerseys were auctioned off for charity after each game. In recent years, many minor-league hockey teams have chosen to wear special commemorative green Jerseys to mark the occasion.

=== Lacrosse ===
The Buffalo Bandits of the National Lacrosse League (like the NHL's Sabres, owned by Terry Pegula) introduced a special black-and-green third jersey on their Saint Patrick's Day 2012 game, which was likewise auctioned off for charity.

=== Football ===
The only other major American sport, football, is out of season during the Saint Patrick's Day holiday. The National Football League does sell Saint Patrick's Day merchandise for its teams, however.

=== Rugby ===
The Saint Patrick's Day Test (also known as the Donnybrook Cup) is an international rugby league football match played between the United States and Ireland. The competition was first started in 1995 with Ireland winning the first two tests with the US winning the last 4 in 2000, 2002, 2003 and 2004. The game is usually held on or around 17 March to coincide with Saint Patrick's Day.

== See also ==
- 2012 St. Patrick's Day beating
- St. Patrick
- St. Patrick's Day
- St. Pat's for All
- Saint Urho
