= Nancy Duffy =

American journalist

- Born: November 24, 1939; Watertown, New York
- Died: December 22, 2006 (aged 67)
- Occupations: News reporter and news anchor
- Known for: Co-founder of the Syracuse St. Patrick's Parade

Nancy Duffy (November 24, 1939—December 22, 2006) was a longtime newspaper/television personality and co-founder of the Syracuse St. Patrick's Parade, Syracuse, New York in 1983.

== Journalism ==
Duffy graduated with a bachelor's degree in 1961 from Marywood College in Scranton, Pennsylvania. After college, she took her vows as a Catholic nun and was known as Sister Jude Michael before leaving the convent after a year.

Duffy worked at newspapers in Scranton and Cortland, New York before moving to Syracuse to work for the Herald-Journal, where she was a police beat reporter. She left that job in 1967 to work as a reporter at WHEN-AM and WHEN-TV (now WTVH).

She took a year off from reporting in 1970, when she became press secretary for Syracuse Mayor Lee Alexander.

She then returned to WTVH, where she worked as a reporter for six years before going to work at what was then WNYS-TV (later WIXT, now WSYR-TV) in 1977. For years, she anchored brief local news and weather reports that aired during breaks in ABC's Good Morning America. While she often covered breaking news, she once said she favored the lighter stories. She filed features at WIXT billed as "Duffy's People", which were gentle profiles of ordinary people with extraordinary stories.

In the early 1990s, Duffy hosted "The Irish Connection", a half-hour public affairs show than ran on Public-access television. She was president of the Syracuse Press Club from 1991 to 1992, and was honored by the club in 2000 with induction into its Wall of Distinction located at the John H. Mulroy Civic Center.

== Parade ==
Duffy helped revive and organize, for several years, Syracuse's Saint Patrick's Parade, which had been discontinued during World War II. She, with the leadership of other Syracusians, helped lead a small group of volunteers in putting together the first parade on March 19, 1983. The parade remains a major annual event, typically drawing an estimated crowd of up to 10,000 marchers and 125,000 spectators gathering along South Salina Street each year on the usually cold and snowy Saturday in March. She considered her greatest legacy to be the Syracuse St. Patrick's Parade. Through the years the parade has become Central New York's largest one-day event, "the largest St. Patrick's Parade, per capita, in the world." Duffy served as the parade committee's first co-president with Daniel F. Casey, and continued as a guiding force even after stepping down in 1997.

After Duffy resigned in as president of the parade, she continued as president-emeritus, where she shouldered the bulk of the work in organizing the event for several more years.

Surplus earnings from the parade over the years were donated to one of Duffy's favorite causes, Project Children, an organization that brings children from Northern Ireland to Central New York for six weeks.

The stretch of Salina Boulevard traversed by the annual St Patrick's Day parade has been named "Nancy Duffy Lane" in her honor.

== Personal life ==
Duffy also taught at Syracuse University, wrote poetry, created charcoal and chalk drawings, led a campaign to save the Syracuse Symphony Orchestra, and volunteered for a wide range of civic organizations and causes, often with links to her Irish heritage.

Duffy also created numerous charcoal and chalk drawings, many with Civil War or Catholic themes. In recent years, several local public libraries exhibited a collection of Duffy's drawings entitled "Native American Faces."

Nancy had established close ties with American Indians during her coverage of the 71-day armed standoff in 1973 between federal authorities and American Indians at Wounded Knee in South Dakota.

Because of her close ties to the Onondaga Nation, Duffy was invited to deliver a walking stick to President Clinton on behalf of the six-nation Iroquois Confederacy after his round of golf in 1999 at LaFayette Country Golf & Country Club.

In 1985, The Post-Standard honored Duffy with one of its annual Women of Achievement awards, which has since been renamed The Post-Standard Achievement Award. Among the numerous other honors she received was the Trailblazer in the Media Award in 1984 from the Central New York Chapter of the National Organization for Women.

Divorced she raised two sons, Matthew, a lawyer in Cleveland, and Peter, a journalist and author living in New York City.

== Death ==
Nancy Duffy died Friday, December 22, 2006, after a long illness.
