= Saint Patrick's Day Parade (disambiguation) =

Saint Patrick's Day is celebrated by various parades. Notable such parades include:

- Holyoke Saint Patrick's Day Parade
- Milwaukee Saint Patrick's Day Parade
- New York City St. Patrick's Day Parade
- Scranton Saint Patrick's Day Parade
