= Pittsburgh flood of 1936 =

Flooding in Pennsylvania, US

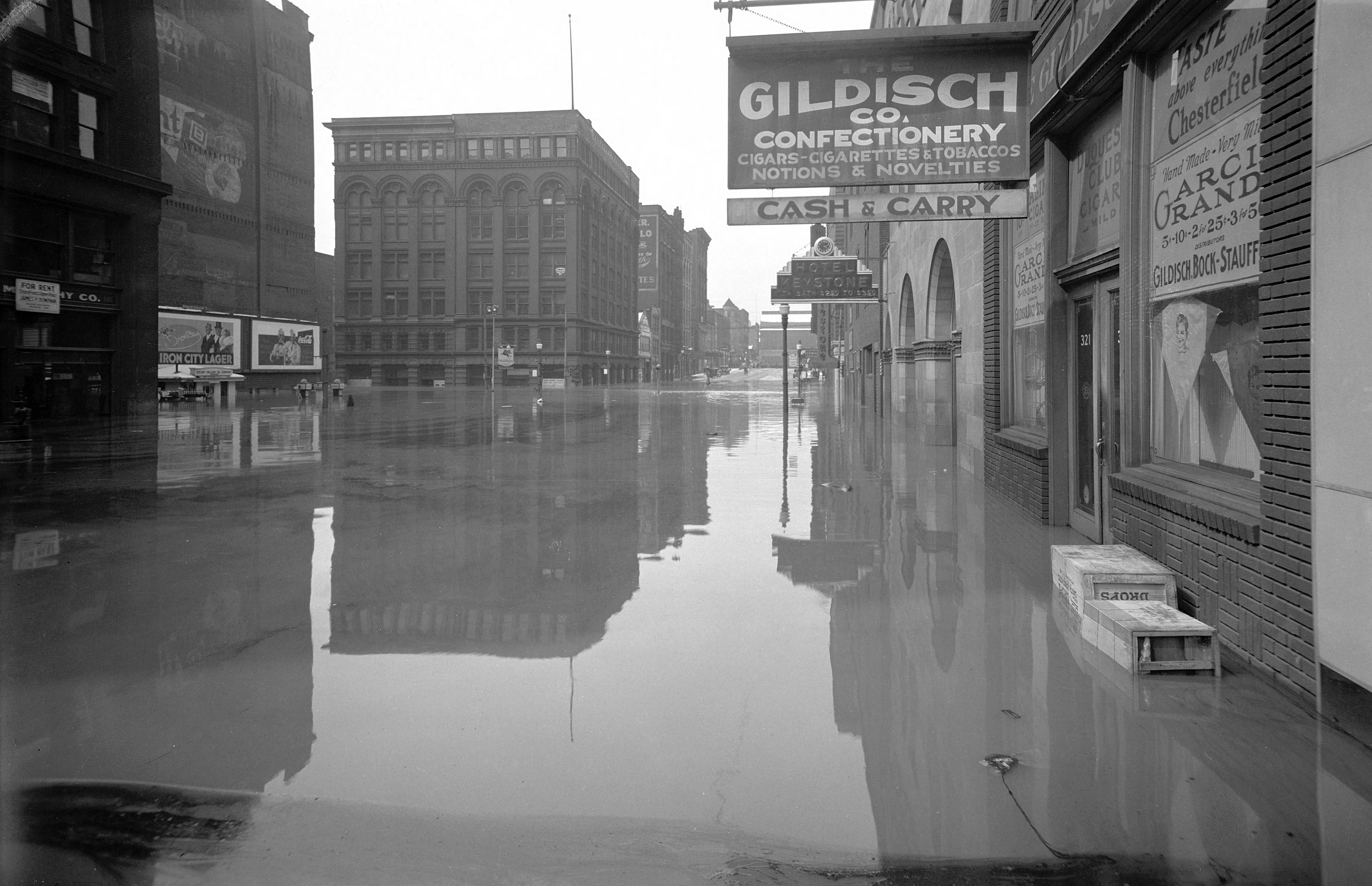
Boulevard of the Allies flooded.

On March 17 and 18, 1936, the city of Pittsburgh, Pennsylvania, witnessed the worst flood in its history when flood levels peaked at 46 feet (14 m). This flood became known as The Great St. Patrick's Day flood, and also affected other areas of the Mid-Atlantic on both sides of the Eastern Continental Divide.

== Flood control ==
Civic organizations in the city, with financial backing from the City of Pittsburgh, Allegheny County and the Chamber of Commerce had been asking the Federal Government for help with flood control for almost thirty years. They had formed committees to lobby government officials and found themselves caught in political processes that ultimately resulted in the city and its residents sustaining devastating damage. In August 1935, the United States House of Representatives passed a bill for nine flood control reservoirs to be built above Pittsburgh. However, while the Senate debated this bill, the tremendous 1936 flood occurred. Congress did not actually appropriate any funds for the project until the 1937 flood which threatened, but spared the city and went on to devastate the Ohio River Valley.

== Causes ==
On March 16, 1936, warmer-than-normal temperatures and torrential rain followed a cold and snowy winter, leading to the rapid melting of snow and ice on the upper Allegheny and Monongahela Rivers. They and their tributaries were already over their banks and were threatening the city of Pittsburgh. On Tuesday, March 17, the waters reached flood stage of 25 feet. Heavy rains overnight caused the waters to rise quickly, and on March 18, the water peaked at about 46 feet, 21 feet above flood stage. Four days later, on March 21, the water finally receded to 24 feet.

== Aftermath ==
The impact to the city was devastating. Total property damage was estimated at between $150 – 250 million (as high as $5.87 billion today). Steel mills that were located around the three rivers suffered devastating damage and 60,000 steel workers within a thirty-mile radius were out of work due to the damage that the mills suffered. Sixty five percent of the downtown business district had been under water from the Point all the way up to Grant Street.

Electric power failed on March 17 and full electric service was not restored for eight days. KDKA radio was able to broadcast without interruption throughout the flood but Pittsburghers were unable to listen because they did not have electricity to run their radios.

The contamination of the water supply led Pittsburgh residents to be told to boil water for fear of a typhoid epidemic. This fear was never realized; whether it was from the boiling of water or just luck is unknown. At least 69 deaths occurred in western Pennsylvania, including 45 in the city.

There was no train service because the railroad tracks that ran along the three rivers were blocked or washed away by the flood. Trolleys were also affected by the power loss and some were abandoned where they were when power was lost. Roads around the rivers were washed away or buckled and there was a gasoline shortage because there was no electricity to run the pumps.

St. Patrick's Church was able to hold dedication ceremonies on St. Patrick's Day despite the rain, but nearby St. Stanislaus suffered severe flooding and pews were seen floating down the street. The pastor had to be rescued from the second floor.

Relief workers consisting of police, firemen and the National Guard secured the city and protected public safety. The absence of electricity caused the pumps at the water intake facility to fail, and left firefighters unable to fight fires. These fires had been burning for days because of the lack of water pressure in the fire hydrants. The Red Cross provided food, clothing and medical supplies, while the Works Progress Administration and the Civilian Conservation Corps rescued people from flooded houses and assisted in the cleanup after waters receded.

On March 20, days after the initial flooding, receding waters and debris fields caused rumors that the massive 16th Street Bridge had collapsed. Although false, the hysteria forced the Pittsburgh Police to declare all bridges closed until they were spot checked.

Many buildings in Pittsburgh, particularly in or near downtown, have markers indicating the height reached by floodwaters.

The flood eventually led to calls for the construction of a dam upstream on the Allegheny to prevent future floods of this magnitude. Laws providing for the construction of the dam were passed in 1936 and 1938, but it would take nearly three decades, and a bitter fight with the Seneca Nation of Indians, before the Kinzua Dam was finally completed in 1965. The Kinzua Dam, despite the delays, was completed in time to protect Pittsburgh from serious damage when Hurricane Agnes hit in 1972.

== Effects in other areas ==
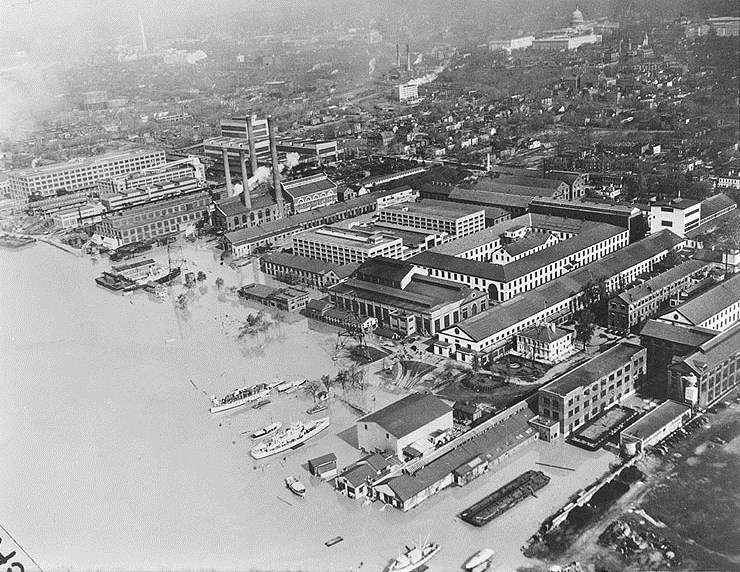
Washington, DC, experienced floods, including at Navy Yard on the Anacostia River.

The Potomac and James Rivers, across the continental divide from the Ohio and its tributaries, also suffered severe flooding during mid-March 1936. Potomac River crossings at Harpers Ferry and Shepherdstown, both in West Virginia, and Hancock and Point of Rocks, both in Maryland, were all destroyed. Great Falls experienced what were, as of July 2014, its highest floods on record. Washington, DC, saw its airport, Washington-Hoover Airport in Arlington, Virginia, flooded.

The effects of the storm also affected the Northeast. Waters raged from New York and Connecticut to New Hampshire and Maine. The Connecticut River reached flood stage at 38 feet, and 28 people died in Connecticut alone, as Hartford was paralyzed by the rising water. The National Guard was called in to save stranded residents. Significant flooding also occurred in New Hampshire, as the Merrimack River crested above 18 feet. In total, storm costs were over $520 million. (equivalent to $6.6 billion in 2015 dollars).

== See also ==
- Johnstown flood of 1936
- The Great Saint Patrick's Day Flood, a children's novel
