= The Great Saint Patrick's Day Flood =

2004 novel

- Author: Mildred S. Flaherty
- Language: English
- Genre: Novel
- Publisher: The Local History Company
- Publication date: 2004
- Publication place: United States
- Media type: Print (Paperback)
- Pages: 104 pp
- ISBN: 0-9711835-8-9
- OCLC: 53131044
- LC Class: PZ7.F59814 Gr 2004

The Great Saint Patrick's Day Flood is a short historical novel for children by the American writer Mildred S. Flaherty based on events of the Pittsburgh Flood of 1936 in Pittsburgh, Pennsylvania.

Set in March, the Allegheny, Monongahela, and Ohio Rivers are rising. Eleven-year-old Billy Flynn and his seven-year-old brother Tommy are happy when school is cancelled. The boys' excitement soon turns to fear and awe as the rivers overflow their banks and people are forced to flee from their homes and work. Soon they experience life as they have never known it, discovering real courage and honor along the way.
