= Sweet Potato Queens =

- Type: Women's organization
- Headquarters: Jackson, Mississippi, United States
- Official language: English
- Website: sweetpotatoqueens.com

Sweet Potato Queens is a women's organization based in Jackson, Mississippi, that has over six thousand registered chapters in over twenty countries.

== Organization ==
The Sweet Potato Queens concept has been explained and made popular by a series of books by Jill Conner Browne, born in Tupelo and raised in Jackson, who came up with the idea in 1982. (Browne is the author of a number of books which form the backbone of the Sweet Potato Queen "movement.") It involves a belief in a sisterhood that promotes self-esteem and positive thinking, appealing to mostly middle-aged middle-class women. As John Ray, the ordering manager at Politics and Prose in Washington once said of the Sweet Potato Queen books, "they began to empower women." In 2005, almost ten thousand women dressed up in costumes and came to Jackson for the annual Hal and Mal's St. Patrick’s Day parade, proceeds from which benefited a local children’s hospital.

Each local chapter assumes its own theme and designs its own costumes. Some of the chapters participate in parades and fund-raisers in their local communities.

== Chapters ==
Each chapter, of which there are over 6,000 of various sizes, assumes its own theme and designs its own costumes. Some of the chapters participate in parades and fundraisers in their local communities. In 2005, almost ten thousand women from the chapters dressed up in costume and came to Jackson for their St Patrick's Day parade, proceeds from which benefited a children’s hospital in the area.

=== Sweet Tea Queens ===
The Sweet Tea Queens is a chapter based in Spartanburg, South Carolina. It was founded by Carolyn "Boss Queen" Steinecke. The Sweet Tea Queens are among the most active of chapters. The members come from all walks of life including a pilot, a comptroller, teacher’s aides, nurses and artists. The Sweet Tea Queens have appeared at festivals and events to raise funds for charity. They have their own float to ferry them through local parades. When they appear on behalf of charity organizations at fundraising events, they often staff a booth or run a contest. Among the parades on the STQ participate in are the Cowpens, South Carolina "Mighty Moo parade", the Gaffney, South Carolina Peach Festival, Spartanburg Spring Fling, Hendersonville, North Carolina's King Apple parade, and a number of upstate South Carolina Christmas parades. They have appeared in feature articles in the Spartanburg Herald Journal, South Carolina Magazine, Travel and Leisure, Belle magazine and others. They have also been guests on WSPA-FM's morning show a number of times as well as being featured in Episode eight of Charter Cable's Talk Of The Town show.

== Sweet Potato Queen Books written by Jill Conner Browne ==
- Sweet Potato Queens' Book of Love (Jan 19, 1999)
- God Save the Sweet Potato Queens (Jan 9, 2001)
- The Sweet Potato Queens' Big-Ass Cookbook and Financial Planner (Jan 7, 2003)
- Sweet Potato Queens' Field Guide to Men: Every Man I Love Is Either Married, Gay, or Dead (Oct 5, 2004)
- The Sweet Potato Queens' Wedding Planner/Divorce Guide (Dec 27, 2005)
- The Sweet Potato Queens' First Big-Ass Novel: Stuff We Didn't Actually Do, but Could Have, and May Yet (Jan 2, 2007)
- The Sweet Potato Queens' Guide to Raising Children for Fun and Profit (Jan 1, 2008)
- American Thighs: The Sweet Potato Queens' Guide to Preserving Your Assets (Dec 30, 2008)
- Fat is the New 30: The Sweet Potato Queens' Guide to Coping with (the crappy parts of) Life (March 20, 2012)
