= Milwaukee Saint Patrick's Day Parade =

The Shamrock Club Saint Patrick Parade logo

Milwaukee Saint Patrick's Day Parade takes place each year in downtown Milwaukee the Saturday prior to Saint Patrick's Day. It is sponsored by the Shamrock Club of Wisconsin. On March 14, 2026, the Shamrock Club will be producing its 58h Annual parade.

The parade is part of a week-long series of events co-sponsored by the Shamrock Club and its partner, Westown Association. These include Irish events at The Avenue in downtown Milwaukee, Westown's SHAM-Rock at the Lucky Clover Pub on Milwaukee's Martin Luther King Drive on Friday evening, the Shamrock Club's annual Mass in Honor of Saint Patrick at Saint Patrick's Church in Milwaukee, and the Shamrock Club's Post Parade Party at the St. Brigid Center on Saturday, the largest parade day family event, with four stages, four dance schools, seven bands, and a Children's Area. " MKE Post Parade Party

The parade marshals from 6th and Wisconsin, with official step off at North Martin Luther King Drive, (formerly Old World Third Street) and Wisconsin, running to Plankinton Avenue, back to MLK Drive, east on Juneau to Water, and ending on Highland. The route is approximately one and one half miles, and takes about 90 minutes.

== History ==
The first parade, on March 17, 1843, was organized partly by Milwaukee officials and members of the Catholic Church in Milwaukee. The Milwaukee officials were trying to garner more influence for the area, as it was smaller than Green Bay. Catholic leaders in Milwaukee were trying to have the American Catholic Church, based in Baltimore, place the archdiocese in Milwaukee. At the time, the United States Church was becoming dominated by Irish cardinals. The Milwaukee Irish and German religious, (there were many Irish born and Gaelic speaking priests in the Wisconsin territory), worked on the bias towards the Irish by the American bishops.

A Swiss German priest, Father Martin Kundig, pushed the idea of the parade. According to Father Leo Johnson, in his 1942 book, Stuffed Saddlebags - The Life Of Father Martin Kundig, Priest - 1805-1879, "His was a life filled with character."

The original parade started at what is today East Wells Street and Van Buren, went north on Van Buren, west on what is today State Street, then south on Jackson Street and back to Wells Street. They circled the church of St. Peter, on Jackson and State, the main downtown church at that time. The Parade Marshal was Milwaukee founder ''Solomon Juneau

By 1844, Milwaukee became the Archdiocese of Wisconsin, beating out the French strongholds of Green Bay, Wisconsin and Prairie du Chien, Wisconsin in the western part of the State. The newly consecrated bishop, Swiss born John Henni, purchased land near the original parade staging area for the Cathedral of St. John the Evangelist (Milwaukee).

=== Reemergence of the Parade in 1967 ===
In 1967, the parade marshaled at the top of the Lincoln Memorial Bridge, at the Milwaukee Art Museum, and marched west along Wisconsin Avenue. The parade terminated at the Milwaukee Public Library, on 10th and Wisconsin. This lasted for one year, as it was discovered, as said Danny O'Donoghue, "The wind blows from west to east, and we had a hard time with the banners and the flags. We decided to reroute the parade." In 1968, the parade route was reversed. The parade was marshaled at the Milwaukee Public Library, then headed east along Wisconsin Avenue, and terminated at the Milwaukee County War Memorial, on Lincoln Memorial Drive and Mason Street. A review stand was positioned at Water and Wisconsin, on the Marine National Bank Now BMO Harris Plaza front court.

In 1973, the City of Milwaukee went forward with plans to rebuild the Wisconsin Avenue Bridge over the Milwaukee River. It was a two year project, and forced the Shamrock Club to find a new home.

=== Mitchell Street ===
Parade organizers were invited to move to Mitchell Street on the South Side of Milwaukee for the 1974 event. The street was named for Milwaukee pioneer and Scots immigrant Alexander Mitchell It was a business district, filled with department stores and smaller stores. The Mitchell Street Business Association hoped that the appearance of the parade along Milwaukee second oldest business strip would give it a spark at renewal. The parade was marshaled on First Street and Orchard, near the Allen-Bradley, (now ''Rockwell International) headquarters. It marched down First to Mitchell Street, and up Mitchell to 13th Street. The parade attracted large crowds in what was then a Polish and Mexican neighborhood.

In 1977,Danny O'Donoghue stepped down as Parade Chair. The parade was then headed up by Jeanne McCue. She was the Shamrock Club's first Wild Irish Rose in 1973. McCue was later honored for her work during the Bosnian War, where she utilized her training as a nurse.

In 1978, Ms. McCue was succeeded by Catherine "Cate" Harris, a longtime Shamrock Club member. She would later help lead volunteers at the International Institute of Wisconsin's Holiday Folk Fair. There was still a strong Irish presence in the area, due to the families who settled at Saint Patrick Parish, located at 723 West Washington, a few blocks north of the staging area for the parade. St. Patrick is the site of the yearly Mass in Honor of St. Patrick on Parade day.

Cate Harris was succeeded by Chuck Ward, one of the leading forces in the Nash's Irish Castle Kazoo Band. He was also a member of the Milwaukee-based Irish music band Blarney. He was later one of the main coordinators of the Milwaukee Irish Fest.

=== North Avenue ===
In 1985, the parade moved to North Avenue, where it ran from 53 Street in Milwaukee, to 74 Street in Wauwatosa. The parade marshaled on the Steuben Middle School playground on 52 and North. The mayors of Milwaukee and Wauwatosa were a part of the parade each year. Maricolette Walsh, the Wauwatosa mayor, was also a Shamrock Club member. She helped to keep fees lower on the Wauwatosa side of 60th Street.

While on North Avenue, the Parade committee sponsored a window decorating contest for business along the parade route. The parade route businesses had leprechauns, floral displays, window paint, and shamrocks looking out at the crowds. At the terminus of the parade route, a post parade party was held at Pius XI Grade School, on 76 and Wright. When the parish decided to use their rink only for roller skating the party was moved to the Wauwatosa Civic Center on 76 and North. Both of the Milwaukee area Irish dance schools, Trinity Academy of Irish Dance and Cashel Dennehy Irish Dancers, performed alternating years.

A number of business owners on North Avenue complained of lost revenue for the parade day, as it was a Saturday, streets were closed from 9 AM until 2 pm, and many of the parade goers would just leave after the event, and not spend any money. An alternative was sought.

=== Bluemound Road ===
The parade was on Bluemound Road in 2001. It still crossed both the cities of Milwaukee and Wauwatosa. Pub owner and County Cork native Derry Hegarty, a former Shamrock Club president, helped facilitate the move. He was the owner of Derry Hegarty's Irish Pub on 54 and Bluemound, one of the many Irish pubs along Bluemound who were excited to host the event in this section of Milwaukee.

The parade started at 70 Street and ended at 51 Street. It was marshaled between 75 and 74 Streets. Financial problems arose with the co-sponsor, the Bluemound Business Advancement Association, so the Shamrock Club looked for another venue. According to the account in the February 2002 Emerald Reflections, a four-year contract was rejected by the Bluemound Business Advancement Association, and they wanted to put in place a 3-year, $7000 annual contribution instead of the previously agreed-to $10,000 per year.

=== Return to Downtown Milwaukee ===
The Westown Business Development organization in downtown Milwaukee had been holding a parade on March 17 each year. The attendance was sparse, and the organization was looking for ways to increase attendance. They made a proposal initially in 2000, and after negotiations broke down with the Shamrock Club and the Bluemound Business group, another proposal was put in place. The two organizations agreed to move the 2002 parade downtown.

The parade took place in downtown Milwaukee in 2002. The original parade route was from 6th and Wisconsin, east to Water Street, north on Water Street, and west on Juneau Avenue to Old World Third Street to Wells and Plankinton.

In 2004, the route was changed to go north on Plankinton Avenue to Old World Third Street, now Martin Luther King Drive, then to Juneau, east to Water Street, and terminating at Highland Boulevard. The change was done at the request of the Marcus Center for the Performing Arts, as the parade was blocking access to the center for Saturday matinees. The parade steps off at  The Avenue, formerly the Shops of Grand Avenue on MLK and Wisconsin.

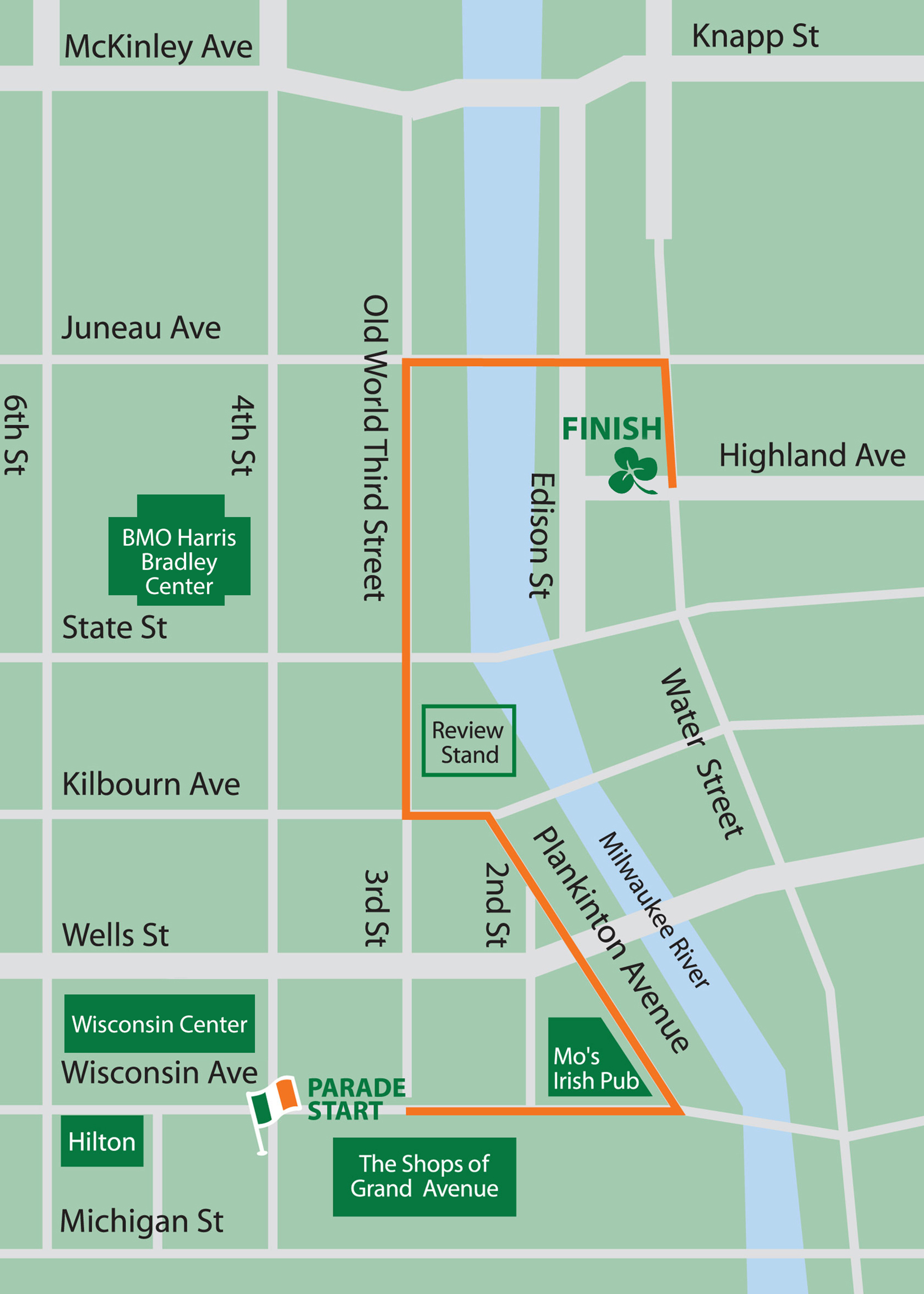
Milwaukee St Patrick Parade Route Map

Mike Boyle returned in 2009, assisted by daughters Erin Hennen and Meghan Boyle. In 2012 and 2013, the parade was directed by Mike Boyle and Denis Donohoe. Killian's Irish Red, a MillerCoors brand, was the lead sponsor starting in 2013, and continuing in 2016. In 2014, Josh Walton took over the parade. The parade was again led by Michael Boyle in 2015, and continues under his leadership.

=== 2018 parade ===
The 2018 Parade was the 52nd Annual Parade. It was held on Saturday, March 10, 2018. It stepped off at 3rd, now named Martin Luther King Jr Drive, and Wisconsin at noon. The parade ran from 3rd and Wisconsin to Plankinton, north to Old World Third Street, then to Juneau Avenue, and down to Water Street, and from there to Highland Avenue, just north of the Marcus Center for the Arts. According to the parade website, 2018 was special for a number of reasons.

As it was both the 175th anniversary of the first St. Patrick Parade in Milwaukee, and the founding of the Milwaukee Archdiocese, Archbishop Jerome Listecki was both the Grand Marshal and the celebrant at the 33rd Annual Mass in Honor of St. Patrick at St. Patrick's Church.

=== 2019 Parade ===
The 2019 parade was the 53rd annual production, held on March 9. 110 units stepped off from 3rd and Wisconsin that day.

=== Cancelation of 2020 Parade ===
On March 10, 2020, the Shamrock club, Westown, and the City of Milwaukee decided to cancel the 54th Annual Parade, due to COVID-19 concerns.

"The safety and health of our patrons and participants is always our priority," Westown Association Executive Director Stacie Callies said. "This was a difficult decision, but all parties want to ensure we are doing our part to help prevent the spread of the disease. This decision was made out of abundant concern for the 30,000 people that come to downtown Milwaukee each year to celebrate with us."

This was reiterated by the Shamrock Club board.

"This was a challenging decision given the amount of planning and work that has gone into this event, which was to be the 60th Anniversary celebration of the Shamrock Club of Wisconsin," Shamrock Club of Wisconsin Parade Director Mike Boyle said. "On behalf of the Shamrock Club of Wisconsin and Westown Association, we want to thank all of our sponsors, participants, volunteers and patrons for their support of the event and this decision."  

Organizers said they were exploring the option of holding the parade at a later date. However, as of July 15, 2020, also due to COVID-19 issues, no other date was selected.

=== Planned 54th Parade Return in September 2021 ===
The Shamrock Club board, and Westown, in January 2021 delayed the parade until September 25, 2021. The parade was to be a Halfway to St. Patrick Day celebration. The date was selected to not be in competition with the delayed Summerfest celebration in downtown Milwaukee. However, due to an increase in the number of COVID-19 cases, and the Omicron variant, the parade was again delayed, this time to March 12, 2022. The decision by both the boards of Westown and the Shamrock Club was made in late August 2021.

Prior to that, this statement was released: "Although we are disappointed that we cannot host the parade in March, this decision was easily made with the health and safety of our participants and spectators in mind," said Shamrock Club of Wisconsin Parade Director Mike Boyle.

"We are excited to hold our first ever Halfway to St. Patrick's Day Parade in September as long as public health conditions allow, but in order for that to happen we need everyone to continue to follow COVID-19 safety guidelines."

=== 2022 to 2026 Parades ===
The parade went back on its regular March schedule in 2022, after a two-year hiatus. It stepped off at noon, March 12, 2022, starting at Martin Luther King Drive, (the former Old World Third Street) and proceeding to Highland and Water Streets.

On March 15, 2025, the 57th edition of the parade took place at noon. The normal stepping off point of MLK and Wisconsin continued. Michael Boyle continued as parade director.

The 2026 parade will take place on Saturday, March 14, at Noon at MLK and Wisconsin. This is the 58th Parade.

The 2026 Post Parade Party will take place at the new St. Bridid's Center, formerly the Irish Cultural and Heritage Center, at 2133 West Wisconsin Avenue, from 2 to 6 pm. The lineup will be announced in March, 2026.

=== Directors ===
- Danny O'Donoghue
- Jeanne McCue
- Cate Harris
- Chuck Ward
- Michael Boyle
- Mick McDermott and Tim O'Brien
- Dan Malloy
- Mike O'Leary and Mark Smith
- Kristine Carrig Pluskota and Denis Donohoe
- Michael Boyle, Meghan Boyle and Erin Hennen
- Josh Walton
- Michael Boyle
