= 2024 San Francisco Giants season =

2024 San Francisco Giants
- League: National League
- Division: West
- Ballpark: Oracle Park
- City: San Francisco, California
- Record: 80–82 (.494)
- Divisional place: 4th
- Owners: Charles B. Johnson (Majority shareholder); Greg E. Johnson (Chairman)
- President: Larry Baer
- President of baseball operations: Farhan Zaidi
- Managers: Bob Melvin
- Television: NBC Sports Bay Area/KNTV (Duane Kuiper, Jon Miller, Dave Flemming, Mike Krukow, Javier Lopez, Shawn Estes, Hunter Pence, Randy Winn)
- Radio: KNBR (104.5 FM and 680 AM) (Jon Miller, Dave Flemming, Duane Kuiper, Joe Ritzo, Mike Krukow, F. P. Santangelo)
- Stats: ESPN.com; Baseball Reference

The 2024 San Francisco Giants season was the 142nd season for the franchise in Major League Baseball, their 67th year in San Francisco, and their 25th at Oracle Park. This was their first season under new manager Bob Melvin, after former manager Gabe Kapler was fired during the 2023 season. They were eliminated from playoff contention for the third consecutive season on September 19. However, they improved upon their 79–83 record from the 2023 season. Despite this, the Giants missed the playoffs for the sixth time out of their last seven seasons, and had a losing record for the second consecutive year. This caused the Giants to fire their President of baseball operations, Farhan Zaidi on September 30. They replaced him with former catcher, Buster Posey.

== Events ==
=== Offseason ===
- November 17, 2023 − The Giants avoided arbitration with OF Austin Slater and OF Mike Yastrzemski agreeing to one-year deals.
- December 14, 2023 – The Giants signed OF Jung-hoo Lee to a six-year contract.
- December 19, 2023 – The Giants acquired OF TJ Hopkins in a trade with the Cincinnati Reds in exchange for cash considerations or a player to be named later.
- December 23, 2023 – The Giants signed C Tom Murphy to a two-year contract with a club option for the 2026 season.
- January 5, 2024 – The Giants acquired RHP Robbie Ray in a trade with the Seattle Mariners in exchange for OF Mitch Haniger, RHP Anthony DeSclafani, and cash considerations.
- January 11, 2024 − The Giants avoided arbitration with 1B/OF LaMonte Wade Jr., 2B Thairo Estrada, and RHP Tyler Rogers agreeing to one-year deals.
- January 18, 2024 − The Giants signed RHP Jordan Hicks to a four-year contract.
- February 2, 2024 – The Giants acquired OF Jonah Cox in a trade with the Oakland Athletics in exchange for RHP Ross Stripling and cash considerations.
- February 18, 2024 – The Giants signed OF Jorge Soler to a 3-year contract.
- March 3, 2024 – The Giants signed 3B Matt Chapman to a one-year contract that also included player options for the 2025 and 2026 seasons and a mutual option for the 2027 season.
- March 19, 2024 – The Giants signed LHP Blake Snell to a 2-year contract that included an opt-out after the 2024 season.

=== Regular season ===
- April 20, 2024 – The Giants acquired RHP Mitch White in a trade with the Toronto Blue Jays in exchange for cash considerations.
- May 10, 2024 – The Giants acquired cash considerations in a trade with the Milwaukee Brewers in exchange for RHP Mitch White.
- July 7, 2024 – The Giants acquired LHP Alex Young in a trade with the Cincinnati Reds in exchange for OF Austin Slater and cash considerations.
- July 29, 2024 – The Giants acquired LHP Tyler Matzek and minor league INF Sabin Ceballos in a trade with the Atlanta Braves in exchange for OF Jorge Soler and RHP Luke Jackson.
- July 30, 2024 – The Giants acquired minor league LHP Jacob Bresnahan and a player to be named later in a trade with the Cleveland Guardians in exchange for RHP Alex Cobb.
- July 30, 2024 – The Giants acquired OF Mark Canha in a trade with the Detroit Tigers in exchange for minor league RHP Eric Silva.
- July 30, 2024 – The Giants acquired cash considerations in a trade with the Los Angeles Angels in exchange for RHP Mike Baumann.

== Season standings ==
=== National League West ===
NL West
Team	W	L	Pct.	GB	Home	Road
Los Angeles Dodgers	98	64	.605	—	52‍–‍29	46‍–‍35
San Diego Padres	93	69	.574	5	45‍–‍36	48‍–‍33
Arizona Diamondbacks	89	73	.549	9	44‍–‍37	45‍–‍36
San Francisco Giants	80	82	.494	18	42‍–‍39	38‍–‍43
Colorado Rockies	61	101	.377	37	37‍–‍44	24‍–‍57

=== National League Wild Card ===
Division leaders
Team	W	L	Pct.
Los Angeles Dodgers	98	64	.605
Philadelphia Phillies	95	67	.586
Milwaukee Brewers	93	69	.574

Wild Card teams (Top 3 teams qualify for postseason)
Team	W	L	Pct.	GB
San Diego Padres	93	69	.574	+4
Atlanta Braves	89	73	.549	—
New York Mets	89	73	.549	—
Arizona Diamondbacks	89	73	.549	—
St. Louis Cardinals	83	79	.512	6
Chicago Cubs	83	79	.512	6
San Francisco Giants	80	82	.494	9
Cincinnati Reds	77	85	.475	12
Pittsburgh Pirates	76	86	.469	13
Washington Nationals	71	91	.438	18
Miami Marlins	62	100	.383	27
Colorado Rockies	61	101	.377	28

=== Record vs. opponents ===
==== Record vs. National League ====
2024 National League record Source: MLB Standings Grid – 2024
Team	AZ	ATL	CHC	CIN	COL	LAD	MIA	MIL	NYM	PHI	PIT	SD	SF	STL	WSH	AL
Arizona	—	2–5	3–3	5–1	9–4	6–7	4–2	4–3	3–4	4–3	4–2	6–7	7–6	3–3	5–1	24–22
Atlanta	5–2	—	4–2	2–4	3–3	2–5	9–4	2–4	7–6	7–6	3–3	3–4	4–3	2–4	5–8	31–15
Chicago	3–3	2–4	—	5–8	4–2	4–2	4–3	5–8	3–4	2–4	7–6	2–4	3–4	6–7	6–1	27–19
Cincinnati	1–5	4–2	8–5	—	6–1	4–3	5–2	4–9	2–4	4–3	5–8	2–4	2–4	7–6	2–4	21–25
Colorado	4–9	3–3	2–4	1–6	—	3–10	2–5	4–3	2–4	2–4	2–4	8–5	3–10	3–4	2–4	20–26
Los Angeles	7–6	5–2	2–4	3–4	10–3	—	5–1	4–3	4–2	1–5	4–2	5–8	9–4	5–2	4–2	30–16
Miami	2–4	4–9	3–4	2–5	5–2	1–5	—	4–2	6–7	6–7	0–7	2–4	3–3	3–3	2–11	19–27
Milwaukee	3–4	4–2	8–5	9–4	3–4	3–4	2–4	—	5–1	2–4	7–6	2–5	4–2	8–5	2–4	31–15
New York	4–3	6–7	4–3	4–2	4–2	2–4	7–6	1–5	—	6–7	5–2	5–2	2–4	4–2	11–2	24–22
Philadelphia	3–4	6–7	4–2	3–4	4–2	5–1	7–6	4–2	7–6	—	3–4	5–1	5–2	4–2	9–4	26–20
Pittsburgh	2–4	3–3	6–7	8–5	4–2	2–4	7–0	6–7	2–5	4–3	—	0–6	2–4	5–8	4–3	20–26
San Diego	7–6	4–3	4–2	4–2	5–8	8–5	4–2	5–2	2–5	1–5	6–0	—	7–6	3–4	6–0	27–19
San Francisco	6–7	3–4	4–3	4–2	10–3	4–9	3–3	2–4	4–2	2–5	4–2	6–7	—	1–5	4–3	23–23
St. Louis	3–3	4–2	7–6	6–7	4–3	2–5	3–3	5–8	2–4	2–4	8–5	4–3	5–1	—	4–3	24–22
Washington	1–5	8–5	1–6	4–2	4–2	2–4	11–2	4–2	2–11	4–9	3–4	0–6	3–4	3–4	—	21–25

Updated with the results of all games through September 30, 2024.

==== Record vs. American League ====
2024 National League record vs. American League Source: MLB Standings
Team	BAL	BOS	CWS	CLE	DET	HOU	KC	LAA	MIN	NYY	OAK	SEA	TB	TEX	TOR
Arizona	1–2	3–0	2–1	3–0	1–2	1–2	2–1	2–1	1–2	1–2	2–1	1–2	0–3	2–2	2–1
Atlanta	1–2	3–1	1–2	2–1	3–0	3–0	2–1	2–1	3–0	2–1	2–1	1–2	2–1	2–1	2–1
Chicago	3–0	1–2	4–0	0–3	2–1	3–0	2–1	2–1	2–1	1–2	1–2	2–1	1–2	1–2	2–1
Cincinnati	0–3	1–2	3–0	1–3	0–3	3–0	0–3	3–0	2–1	3–0	1–2	0–3	1–2	1–2	2–1
Colorado	1–2	2–1	1–2	2–1	1–2	0–4	2–1	2–1	1–2	1–2	1–2	1–2	1–2	3–0	1–2
Los Angeles	2–1	3–0	3–0	2–1	1–2	1–2	2–1	2–2	2–1	2–1	2–1	3–0	2–1	1–2	2–1
Miami	2–1	0–3	2–1	1–2	2–1	0–3	1–2	0–3	2–1	1–2	1–2	2–1	1–3	1–2	3–0
Milwaukee	2–1	2–1	3–0	3–0	2–1	1–2	1–2	2–1	3–1	1–2	2–1	2–1	2–1	3–0	2–1
New York	2–1	3–0	3–0	0–3	1–2	1–2	2–1	1–2	2–1	4–0	1–2	0–3	0–3	2–1	2–1
Philadelphia	1–2	1–2	3–0	1–2	2–1	2–1	2–1	2–1	1–2	0–3	1–2	1–2	3–0	3–0	3–1
Pittsburgh	2–1	0–3	3–0	1–2	2–2	2–1	1–2	1–2	2–1	2–1	0–3	2–1	1–2	1–2	1–2
San Diego	2–1	2–1	3–0	2–1	2–1	2–1	2–1	0–3	2–1	1–2	3–0	1–3	2–1	2–1	1–2
San Francisco	2–1	1–2	2–1	1–2	2–1	2–1	3–0	1–2	2–1	0–3	2–2	1–2	1–2	2–1	1–2
St. Louis	3–0	2–1	1–2	2–1	1–2	1–2	1–3	2–1	2–1	2–1	2–1	1–2	2–1	2–1	0–3
Washington	2–2	1–2	1–2	1–2	2–1	2–1	0–3	2–1	1–2	2–1	1–2	2–1	1–2	1–2	2–1

Updated with the results of all games through September 30, 2024.

== Game log ==
=== Regular season ===
Legend
	Giants win
	Giants loss
	Postponement
	Eliminated from playoff spot
**Bold**	Giants team member

2024 Game Log: 80–82 (Home: 42–39; Away: 38–43)
March/April: 14–16 (Home: 9–7; Away: 5–9)

#	Date	Opponent	Score	Win	Loss	Save	Stadium	Attendance	Record
1	March 28	@ Padres	4–6	Matsui (1–0)	**Jackson** (0–1)	Suárez (2)	Petco Park	44,953	0–1
2	March 29	@ Padres	8–3	**Harrison** (1–0)	Musgrove (0–1)	—	Petco Park	45,427	1–1
3	March 30	@ Padres	9–6	**Hicks** (1–0)	Cease (0–1)	—	Petco Park	37,104	2–1
4	March 31	@ Padres	4–13	Ávila (1–0)	**Jefferies** (0–1)	—	Petco Park	34,499	2–2
5	April 1	@ Dodgers	3–8	Paxton (1–0)	**Winn** (0–1)	—	Dodger Stadium	49,044	2–3
6	April 2	@ Dodgers	4–5	Yarbrough (1–0)	**Webb** (0–1)	Phillips (3)	Dodger Stadium	49,365	2–4
7	April 3	@ Dodgers	4–5	Glasnow (2–0)	**Harrison** (1–1)	Lamet (1)	Dodger Stadium	52,746	2–5
8	April 5	Padres	3–2	**Doval** (1–0)	De Los Santos (0–1)	—	**Oracle Park**	40,645	3–5
9	April 6	Padres	0–4	King (2–0)	**Winn** (0–2)	—	**Oracle Park**	40,114	3–6
10	April 7	Padres	3–2	**Walker** (1–0)	Brito (0–2)	**Doval** (1)	**Oracle Park**	40,149	4–6
11	April 8	Nationals	1–8	Williams (2–0)	**Snell** (0–1)	—	**Oracle Park**	25,582	4–7
12	April 9	Nationals	3–5	Weems (1–0)	**Walker** (1–1)	Finnegan (4)	**Oracle Park**	24,380	4–8
13	April 10	Nationals	7–1	**Hicks** (2–0)	Corbin (0–2)	—	**Oracle Park**	25,558	5–8
14	April 12	@ Rays	1–2	Cleavinger (2–0)	**Winn** (0–3)	Fairbanks (3)	Tropicana Field	15,146	5–9
15	April 13	@ Rays	11–2	**Webb** (1–1)	Pepiot (1–2)	—	Tropicana Field	17,411	6–9
16	April 14	@ Rays	4–9	Alexander (1–0)	**Snell** (0–2)	—	Tropicana Field	19,470	6–10
17	April 15	@ Marlins	4–3	**Harrison** (2–1)	Soriano (0–1)	**Doval** (2)	LoanDepot Park	8,290	7–10
18	April 16	@ Marlins	3–6	Weathers (2–1)	**Walker** (1–2)	Scott (2)	LoanDepot Park	8,076	7–11
19	April 17	@ Marlins	3–1	**Winn** (1–3)	Cronin (0–2)	**Doval** (3)	LoanDepot Park	8,179	8–11
20	April 18	Diamondbacks	5–0	**Webb** (2–1)	Allen (0–1)	—	**Oracle Park**	26,896	9–11
21	April 19	Diamondbacks	1–17	Montgomery (1–0)	**Snell** (0–3)	—	**Oracle Park**	33,921	9–12
22	April 20	Diamondbacks	7–3	**Walker** (2–2)	Gallen (3–1)	—	**Oracle Park**	31,063	10–12
23	April 21	Diamondbacks	3–5	Cecconi (1–0)	**Miller** (0–1)	Ginkel (4)	**Oracle Park**	35,922	10–13
24	April 22	Mets	5–2	**Winn** (2–3)	Quintana (1–2)	—	**Oracle Park**	24,138	11–13
25	April 23	Mets	5–1	**Webb** (3–1)	Severino (2–2)	**Doval** (4)	**Oracle Park**	25,453	12–13
26	April 24	Mets	2–8	Garrett (4–0)	**Hjelle** (0–1)	—	**Oracle Park**	30,183	12–14
27	April 26	Pirates	3–0	**Doval** (2–0)	Bednar (1–2)	—	**Oracle Park**	37,110	13–14
28	April 27	Pirates	3–4 (10)	Stratton (1–0)	**Ta. Rogers** (0–1)	Bednar (5)	**Oracle Park**	34,841	13–15
29	April 28	Pirates	3–2	**Winn** (3–3)	Jones (2–3)	**Doval** (5)	**Oracle Park**	36,380	14–15
30	April 30	@ Red Sox	0–4	Criswell (2–1)	**Webb** (3–2)	—	Fenway Park	30,027	14–16

May: 15–13 (Home: 8–5; Away: 7–8)

#	Date	Opponent	Score	Win	Loss	Save	Stadium	Attendance	Record
31	May 1	@ Red Sox	2–6	Crawford (2–1)	**Jefferies** (0–2)	—	Fenway Park	30,787	14–17
32	May 2	@ Red Sox	3–1	**Walker** (3–2)	Kelly (0–1)	**Doval** (6)	Fenway Park	30,065	15–17
33	May 3	@ Phillies	3–4	Strahm (2–0)	**Hicks** (2–1)	Alvarado (6)	Citizens Bank Park	40,888	15–18
34	May 4	@ Phillies	3–14	Suárez (6–0)	**Winn** (3–4)	—	Citizens Bank Park	42,610	15–19
35	May 5	@ Phillies	4–5	Walker (2–0)	**Webb** (3–3)	Alvarado (7)	Citizens Bank Park	41,058	15–20
36	May 6	@ Phillies	1–6	Wheeler (4–3)	**Black** (0–1)	—	Citizens Bank Park	33,408	15–21
37	May 7	@ Rockies	5–0	**Harrison** (3–1)	Hudson (0–6)	—	Coors Field	21,259	16–21
38	May 8	@ Rockies	8–6	**Hicks** (3–1)	Lambert (2–2)	—	Coors Field	20,532	17–21
39	May 9	@ Rockies	1–9	Quantrill (2–3)	**Winn** (3–5)	—	Coors Field	23,870	17–22
40	May 10	Reds	2–4	Abbott (2–4)	**Webb** (3–4)	Díaz (7)	**Oracle Park**	32,867	17–23
41	May 11	Reds	5–1	**Ta. Rogers** (1–1)	Lodolo (3–2)	—	**Oracle Park**	37,321	18–23
42	May 12	Reds	6–5 (10)	**Jackson** (1–1)	Pagán (2–3)	—	**Oracle Park**	36,210	19–23
43	May 13	Dodgers	4–6 (10)	Treinen (1–0)	**Ta. Rogers** (1–2)	Feyereisen (1)	**Oracle Park**	35,033	19–24
44	May 14	Dodgers	2–10	Stone (4–1)	**Winn** (3–6)	—	**Oracle Park**	35,575	19–25
45	May 15	Dodgers	4–1	**Webb** (4–4)	Hernández (0–1)	**Doval** (7)	**Oracle Park**	36,027	20–25
46	May 17	Rockies	10–5	**Hjelle** (1–1)	Feltner (1–4)	—	**Oracle Park**	32,025	21–25
47	May 18	Rockies	14–4	**Harrison** (4–1)	Blach (1–2)	—	**Oracle Park**	31,098	22–25
48	May 19	Rockies	4–1	**Hicks** (4–1)	Hudson (1–7)	**Doval** (8)	**Oracle Park**	34,766	23–25
49	May 21	@ Pirates	6–7 (10)	Bednar (3–3)	**Miller** (0–2)	—	PNC Park	12,652	23–26
50	May 22	@ Pirates	9–5 (10)	**Walker** (4–2)	Mlodzinski (0–1)	—	PNC Park	13,830	24–26
51	May 23	@ Pirates	7–6	**Jackson** (2–1)	Stratton (1–1)	**Ty. Rogers** (1)	PNC Park	23,162	25–26
52	May 24	@ Mets	8–7	**Avila** (1–0)	Garrett (5–2)	**Doval** (9)	Citi Field	26,658	26–26
53	May 25	@ Mets	7–2 (10)	**Jackson** (3–1)	Reid-Foley (1–2)	—	Citi Field	32,971	27–26
54	May 26	@ Mets	3–4	Houser (1–4)	**Ty. Rogers** (0–1)	—	Citi Field	41,016	27–27
55	May 27	Phillies	8–4	**Rodríguez** (1–0)	Walker (3–1)	—	**Oracle Park**	40,598	28–27
56	May 28	Phillies	1–0 (10)	**Hjelle** (2–1)	Strahm (3–1)	—	**Oracle Park**	34,655	29–27
57	May 29	Phillies	1–6	Sánchez (3–3)	**Harrison** (4–2)	—	**Oracle Park**	31,763	29–28
58	May 31	Yankees	2–6	Stroman (5–2)	**Hicks** (4–2)	—	**Oracle Park**	35,018	29–29

June: 12–15 (Home: 8–7; Away: 4–8)

#	Date	Opponent	Score	Win	Loss	Save	Stadium	Attendance	Record
59	June 1	Yankees	3–7	Poteet (2–0)	**Webb** (4–5)	—	**Oracle Park**	34,487	29–30
60	June 2	Yankees	5–7	Tonkin (2–3)	**Doval** (2–1)	Holmes (17)	**Oracle Park**	39,485	29–31
61	June 3	@ Diamondbacks	2–4	Thompson (3–2)	**Rodríguez** (1–1)	—	Chase Field	22,551	29–32
62	June 4	@ Diamondbacks	5–8	Ginkel (4–3)	**Harrison** (4–3)	Sewald (6)	Chase Field	23,548	29–33
63	June 5	@ Diamondbacks	9–3	**Hjelle** (3–1)	Montgomery (3–4)	—	Chase Field	24,178	30–33
64	June 7	@ Rangers	5–2	**Webb** (5–5)	Robertson (2–3)	**Doval** (10)	Globe Life Field	35,868	31–33
65	June 8	@ Rangers	3–1	**Miller** (1–2)	Heaney (2–7)	**Doval** (11)	Globe Life Field	34,843	32–33
66	June 9	@ Rangers	2–7	Eovaldi (3–2)	**Winn** (3–7)	—	Globe Life Field	34,912	32–34
67	June 10	Astros	4–3 (10)	**Rodríguez** (2–1)	Montero (1–2)	—	**Oracle Park**	32,820	33–34
68	June 11	Astros	1–3	Blanco (6–2)	**Hicks** (4–3)	Pressly (2)	**Oracle Park**	32,853	33–35
69	June 12	Astros	5–3	**Webb** (6–5)	Valdez (5–4)	**Doval** (12)	**Oracle Park**	34,506	34–35
70	June 14	Angels	6–8	Anderson (6–6)	**Howard** (0–1)	Estévez (11)	**Oracle Park**	32,842	34–36
71	June 15	Angels	3–4	Moore (3–2)	**Walker** (4–3)	Estévez (12)	**Oracle Park**	36,235	34–37
72	June 16	Angels	13–6	**Bivens** (1–0)	Suárez (1–2)	—	**Oracle Park**	41,008	35–37
73	June 17	@ Cubs	7–6	**Miller** (2–2)	Neris (6–2)	**Doval** (13)	Wrigley Field	36,048	36–37
74	June 18	@ Cubs	2–5	Miller (2–0)	**Ty. Rogers** (0–2)	Thompson (1)	Wrigley Field	36,297	36–38
75	June 19	@ Cubs	5–6	Hendricks (1–4)	**Bivens** (1–1)	Brewer (1)	Wrigley Field	37,673	36–39
76	June 20*	@ Cardinals	5–6	Pallante (3–3)	**Winn** (3–8)	Helsley (25)	Rickwood Field	8,332	36–40
77	June 22	@ Cardinals	4–9	Mikolas (6–6)	**Hicks** (4–4)	—	Busch Stadium	41,815	36–41
78	June 23	@ Cardinals	3–5	Gray (9–4)	**Webb** (6–6)	Helsley (26)	Busch Stadium	37,492	36–42
79	June 24	Cubs	5–4	**Howard** (1–1)	Smyly (2–4)	—	**Oracle Park**	30,701	37–42
80	June 25	Cubs	5–1	**Ty. Rogers** (1–2)	Hendricks (1–5)	—	**Oracle Park**	30,368	38–42
81	June 26	Cubs	4–3	**Jackson** (4–1)	Smyly (2–5)	**Doval** (14)	**Oracle Park**	30,893	39–42
82	June 27	Cubs	3–5 (10)	Neris (7–2)	**Jackson** (4–2)	Hodge (1)	**Oracle Park**	31,535	39–43
83	June 28	Dodgers	5–3	**Doval** (3–1)	Treinen (2–2)	—	**Oracle Park**	40,052	40–43
84	June 29	Dodgers	7–14 (11)	Hudson (5–1)	**Hjelle** (3–2)	—	**Oracle Park**	39,663	40–44
85	June 30	Dodgers	10–4	**Bivens** (2–1)	Paxton (7–2)	—	**Oracle Park**	40,428	41–44
*June 20 game played at Rickwood Field in Birmingham, Alabama

July: 13–12 (Home: 8–4; Away: 5–8)

#	Date	Opponent	Score	Win	Loss	Save	Stadium	Attendance	Record
86	July 2	@ Braves	5–3	**Birdsong** (1–0)	Lee (2–2)	**Doval** (15)	Truist Park	34,047	42–44
87	July 3	@ Braves	1–3	Sale (11–3)	**Hicks** (4–5)	Iglesias (21)	Truist Park	38,834	42–45
88	July 4	@ Braves	4–2	**Webb** (7–6)	Morton (5–5)	**Doval** (16)	Truist Park	40,672	43–45
89	July 5	@ Guardians	4–2	**Walker** (5–3)	Bibee (7–3)	**Doval** (17)	Progressive Field	36,769	44–45
90	July 6	@ Guardians	4–5	Ávila (3–1)	**Harrison** (4–4)	Clase (26)	Progressive Field	36,081	44–46
91	July 7	@ Guardians	4–5	Smith (4–1)	**Hjelle** (3–3)	Clase (27)	Progressive Field	32,012	44–47
92	July 9	Blue Jays	4–3	**Miller** (3–2)	Richards (1–1)	—	**Oracle Park**	32,924	45–47
93	July 10	Blue Jays	6–10	Bassitt (8–7)	**Webb** (7–7)	—	**Oracle Park**	32,014	45–48
94	July 11	Blue Jays	3–5	Gausman (7–8)	**Hicks** (4–6)	Green (5)	**Oracle Park**	30,064	45–49
95	July 12	Twins	7–1	**Harrison** (5–4)	Ryan (6–6)	—	**Oracle Park**	34,106	46–49
96	July 13	Twins	2–4	Sands (4–1)	**Ta. Rogers** (1–3)	Durán (15)	**Oracle Park**	32,582	46–50
97	July 14	Twins	3–2	**Walker** (6–3)	Durán (5–4)	—	**Oracle Park**	34,115	47–50
–	July 16	**94th All-Star Game in Arlington, TX**							
98	July 19	@ Rockies	3–7	Beeks (6–4)	**Ty. Rogers** (1–3)	—	Coors Field	40,115	47–51
99	July 20	@ Rockies	3–4	Freeland (2–3)	**Webb** (7–8)	Vodnik (3)	Coors Field	44,178	47–52
100	July 21	@ Rockies	3–2	**Birdsong** (2–0)	Feltner (1–10)	**Doval** (18)	Coors Field	30,507	48–52
101	July 22	@ Dodgers	2–3	Treinen (4–2)	**Miller** (3–3)	Hudson (7)	Dodger Stadium	49,576	48–53
102	July 23	@ Dodgers	2–5	Knack (2–2)	**Hicks** (4–7)	Phillips (15)	Dodger Stadium	52,627	48–54
103	July 24	@ Dodgers	8–3	**Ray** (1–0)	Glasnow (8–6)	—	Dodger Stadium	54,070	49–54
104	July 25	@ Dodgers	4–6	Treinen (5–2)	**Ty. Rogers** (1–4)	Honeywell Jr. (1)	Dodger Stadium	52,291	49–55
105	July 26	Rockies	11–4	**Harrison** (6–4)	Freeland (2–4)	—	**Oracle Park**	32,861	50–55
106	July 27 (1)	Rockies	4–1	**Walker** (7–3)	Lawrence (3–4)	**Doval** (19)	**Oracle Park**	see 2nd game	51–55
107	July 27 (2)	Rockies	5–0	**Birdsong** (3–0)	Gordon (0–3)	—	**Oracle Park**	34,543	52–55
108	July 28	Rockies	5–4	**Rodríguez** (3–1)	Gomber (2–7)	**Doval** (20)	**Oracle Park**	37,178	53–55
109	July 30	Athletics	2–5	Sears (8–8)	**Ray** (1–1)	—	**Oracle Park**	37,885	53–56
110	July 31	Athletics	1–0	**Webb** (8–8)	Stripling (2–10)	—	**Oracle Park**	38,668	54–56

August: 14–13 (Home: 6–6; Away: 8–7)

#	Date	Opponent	Score	Win	Loss	Save	Stadium	Attendance	Record
111	August 2	@ Reds	3–0	**Snell** (1–3)	Abbott (9–8)	—	Great American Ball Park	28,075	55–56
112	August 3	@ Reds	4–6	Greene (8–4)	**Harrison** (6–5)	Díaz (22)	Great American Ball Park	32,602	55–57
113	August 4	@ Reds	8–2	**Ray** (2–1)	Spiers (4–3)	—	Great American Ball Park	27,692	56–57
114	August 5	@ Nationals	4–1	**Webb** (9–8)	Corbin (2–12)	**Doval** (21)	Nationals Park	14,674	57–57
115	August 6	@ Nationals	5–11	Gore (7–9)	**Birdsong** (3–1)	—	Nationals Park	17,044	57–58
116	August 7	@ Nationals	7–4	**Snell** (2–3)	Irvin (8–10)	**Doval** (22)	Nationals Park	13,310	58–58
117	August 8	@ Nationals	9–5 (10)	**Doval** (4–1)	Garcia (2–4)	—	Nationals Park	12,423	59–58
118	August 9	Tigers	3–2	**Ty. Rogers** (2–4)	Foley (3–4)	—	**Oracle Park**	33,037	60–58
119	August 10	Tigers	3–1	**Webb** (10–8)	Hurter (0–1)	**Walker** (1)	**Oracle Park**	40,030	61–58
120	August 11	Tigers	4–5	Montero (3–5)	**Birdsong** (3–2)	Vest (1)	**Oracle Park**	40,447	61–59
121	August 12	Braves	0–1 (10)	Iglesias (2–1)	**Ta. Rogers** (1–4)	—	**Oracle Park**	30,184	61–60
122	August 13	Braves	3–4 (10)	Lee (4–2)	**Rodríguez** (3–2)	Iglesias (25)	**Oracle Park**	30,468	61–61
123	August 14	Braves	2–13	Holmes (1–0)	**Ray** (2–2)	—	**Oracle Park**	27,460	61–62
124	August 15	Braves	6–0	**Webb** (11–8)	Fried (7–7)	—	**Oracle Park**	29,319	62–62
125	August 17	@ Athletics	0–2	Bido (4–3)	**Birdsong** (3–3)	Otañez (1)	Oakland Coliseum	37,551	62–63
126	August 18	@ Athletics	4–2 (10)	**Walker** (8–3)	Jiménez (1–3)	—	Oakland Coliseum	32,727	63–63
127	August 19	White Sox	5–3	**Harrison** (7–5)	Cannon (2–7)	**Hicks** (1)	**Oracle Park**	29,209	64–63
128	August 20	White Sox	4–1	**Ray** (3–2)	Martin (0–2)	**Walker** (2)	**Oracle Park**	28,766	65–63
129	August 21	White Sox	2–6	Ellard (1–1)	**Miller** (3–4)	—	**Oracle Park**	28,375	65–64
130	August 23	@ Mariners	5–6 (10)	Snider (3–2)	**Miller** (3–5)	—	T-Mobile Park	38,762	65–65
131	August 24	@ Mariners	4–3	**Bivens** (3–1)	Kirby (9–10)	**Walker** (3)	T-Mobile Park	38,027	66–65
132	August 25	@ Mariners	3–4	Woo (6–2)	**Hjelle** (3–4)	Muñoz (19)	T-Mobile Park	35,062	66–66
133	August 27	@ Brewers	5–4	**Doval** (5–1)	Payamps (3–6)	**Walker** (4)	American Family Field	24,354	67–66
134	August 28	@ Brewers	3–5	Peralta (9–7)	**Harrison** (7–6)	Williams (6)	American Family Field	23,247	67–67
135	August 29	@ Brewers	0–6	Civale (5–8)	**Birdsong** (3–4)	—	American Family Field	30,920	67–68
136	August 30	Marlins	3–1	**Ty. Rogers** (3–4)	Baumann (3–1)	**Walker** (5)	**Oracle Park**	33,606	68–68
137	August 31	Marlins	3–4	Cabrera (3–6)	**Black** (0–2)	Faucher (5)	**Oracle Park**	36,087	68–69

September: 12–13 (Home: 3–10; Away: 9–3)

#	Date	Opponent	Score	Win	Loss	Save	Stadium	Attendance	Record
138	September 1	Marlins	5–7	Curry (1–2)	**Webb** (11–9)	Faucher (6)	**Oracle Park**	41,187	68–70
139	September 3	Diamondbacks	7–8	Nelson (10–6)	**Harrison** (7–7)	Martínez (8)	**Oracle Park**	23,545	68–71
140	September 4	Diamondbacks	4–6	Gallen (11–6)	**Birdsong** (3–5)	—	**Oracle Park**	22,855	68–72
141	September 5	Diamondbacks	3–2	**Walker** (9–3)	Ginkel (7–3)	—	**Oracle Park**	27,871	69–72
142	September 6	@ Padres	1–5	King (12–8)	**Black** (0–3)	—	Petco Park	42,595	69–73
143	September 7	@ Padres	6–3	**Webb** (12–9)	Cease (12–11)	**Walker** (6)	Petco Park	43,318	70–73
144	September 8	@ Padres	7–6	**Miller** (4–5)	Musgrove (5–5)	**Walker** (7)	Petco Park	42,996	71–73
145	September 10	Brewers	2–3	Civale (6–8)	**Roupp** (0–1)	Williams (10)	**Oracle Park**	25,096	71–74
146	September 11	Brewers	13–2	**Snell** (3–3)	Rea (12–5)	—	**Oracle Park**	22,042	72–74
147	September 12	Brewers	0–3	Montas (7–10)	**Doval** (5–2)	Williams (11)	**Oracle Park**	22,184	72–75
148	September 13	Padres	0–5	Cease (13–11)	**Webb** (12–10)	—	**Oracle Park**	39,798	72–76
149	September 14	Padres	0–8	Musgrove (6–5)	**Black** (0–4)	—	**Oracle Park**	31,243	72–77
150	September 15	Padres	3–4 (10)	Suárez (9–3)	**Doval** (5–3)	Morejón (2)	**Oracle Park**	33,043	72–78
151	September 17	@ Orioles	10–0	**Snell** (4–3)	Suárez (8–6)	—	Camden Yards	23,967	73–78
152	September 18	@ Orioles	5–3	**Birdsong** (4–5)	Kremer (7–10)	**Walker** (8)	Camden Yards	23,856	74–78
153	September 19	@ Orioles	3–5	Soto (3–5)	**Walker** (9–4)	—	Camden Yards	23,181	74–79
154	September 20	@ Royals	2–1	**Black** (1–4)	Wacha (13–8)	**Doval** (23)	Kauffman Stadium	22,117	75–79
155	September 21	@ Royals	9–0	**Roupp** (1–1)	Singer (9–12)	—	Kauffman Stadium	24,189	76–79
156	September 22	@ Royals	2–0	**Snell** (5–3)	Lugo (16–9)	**Walker** (9)	Kauffman Stadium	24,189	77–79
157	September 23	@ Diamondbacks	6–3	**Birdsong** (5–5)	Rodríguez (3–4)	**Walker** (10)	Chase Field	23,359	78–79
158	September 24	@ Diamondbacks	11–0	**Webb** (13–10)	Pfaadt (10–10)	—	Chase Field	22,355	79–79
159	September 25	@ Diamondbacks	2–8	Gallen (14–6)	**Black** (1–5)	—	Chase Field	23,767	79–80
160	September 27	Cardinals	3–6	Mikolas (10–11)	**Roupp** (1–1)	Helsley (49)	**Oracle Park**	35,101	79–81
161	September 28	Cardinals	6–5	**Walker** (10–4)	Liberatore (3–4)	**Bivens** (1)	**Oracle Park**	36,328	80–81
162	September 29	Cardinals	1–6	McGreevy (3–0)	**Birdsong** (5–6)	—	**Oracle Park**	32,348	80–82

== Roster ==
2024 San Francisco Giants
Roster
Pitchers: 58 Nick Avila; 54 Mike Baumann; 43 Tristan Beck; 60 Hayden Birdsong; 76 Spencer Bivens; 47 Mason Black; 78 Raymond Burgos; 75 Camilo Doval; 45 Kyle Harrison; 12 Jordan Hicks; 64 Sean Hjelle; 56 Spencer Howard; 77 Luke Jackson; 56 Daulton Jefferies; 72 Trevor McDonald; 68 Erik Miller; 23 Robbie Ray; 73 Randy Rodríguez; 33 Taylor Rogers; 71 Tyler Rogers; 65 Landen Roupp; 7 Blake Snell; 70 Kai-Wei Teng; 74 Ryan Walker; 57 Austin Warren; 62 Logan Webb; 54 Mitch White; 67 Keaton Winn	Catchers: 14 Patrick Bailey; 2,18 Curt Casali; 34 Andrew Knapp; 19 Tom Murphy; 50 Jakson Reetz; 21 Blake Sabol; Infielders: 16 Nick Ahmed; 61 Trenton Brooks; 16 Mark Canha; 26 Matt Chapman; 39 Thairo Estrada; 49 Tyler Fitzgerald; 41 Wilmer Flores; 37 Marco Luciano; 10 Casey Schmitt; 32 David Villar; 31 LaMonte Wade Jr.; 18 Donovan Walton; 0 Brett Wisely	Outfielders: 8 Michael Conforto; 59 Jerar Encarnación; 48 Derek Hill; 51 Jung-hoo Lee; 29 Luis Matos; 58 Grant McCray; 34 Ryan McKenna; 17,21 Heliot Ramos; 13 Austin Slater; 5 Mike Yastrzemski; Other batters: 2 Jorge Soler	Manager: 6 Bob Melvin; Coaches: 81 Garvin Alston (bullpen); 95 Pat Burrell (hitting); 52 Ryan Christenson (bench); 85 Pedro Guerrero (assistant hitting); 91 Mark Hallberg (first base); 87 J. P. Martinez (assistant pitching); 92 Alyssa Nakken (special assistant); 98 Fernando Perez (director, video coaching); 80 Bryan Price (pitching); 99 Taira Uematsu (assistant coach); -- Justin Viele (hitting); 9 Matt Williams (third base)

=== MLB debuts ===
Giants players who made their MLB debuts during the 2024 regular season:

- March 28: Jung-hoo Lee
- March 31: Kai-Wei Teng
- April 1: Nick Avila
- May 6: Mason Black

== Player stats ==
= Indicates team leader

= Indicates league leader

=== Batting ===
Note: G = Games played; AB = At bats; R = Runs scored; H = Hits; 2B = Doubles; 3B = Triples; HR = Home runs; RBI = Runs batted in; SB = Stolen bases; BB = Walks; AVG = Batting average; SLG = Slugging average

Player	G	AB	R	H	2B	3B	HR	RBI	SB	BB	AVG	SLG
Matt Chapman	154	575	98	142	39	2	27	78	15	64	.247	.463
Heliot Ramos	121	475	54	128	23	3	22	72	6	37	.269	.469
Michael Conforto	130	438	56	104	27	3	20	66	0	42	.237	.450
Mike Yastrzemski	140	428	60	99	16	9	18	57	3	38	.231	.437
Patrick Bailey	121	401	46	94	16	1	8	46	4	39	.234	.339
Thairo Estrada	96	364	43	79	15	2	9	47	2	10	.217	.343
Jorge Soler	93	341	57	82	23	1	12	40	1	44	.240	.419
LaMonte Wade Jr.	117	331	45	86	16	0	8	34	2	62	.260	.381
Tyler Fitzgerald	96	314	53	88	19	2	15	34	17	22	.280	.497
Brett Wisely	91	252	25	60	13	1	4	31	2	13	.238	.345
Wilmer Flores	71	214	19	44	12	0	4	26	0	20	.206	.318
Nick Ahmed	52	155	13	36	6	1	1	15	1	10	.232	.303
Luis Matos	45	150	14	32	5	0	5	25	0	5	.213	.347
Jung-hoo Lee	37	145	15	38	4	0	2	8	2	10	.262	.331
Grant McCray	37	124	13	25	3	2	5	10	5	6	.202	.379
Jerar Encarnación	35	113	13	28	5	0	5	19	1	5	.248	.425
Curt Casali	41	108	12	21	3	0	1	8	0	13	.194	.250
Casey Schmitt	40	107	11	27	4	1	6	16	0	4	.252	.477
Austin Slater	43	90	12	18	1	0	1	9	2	16	.200	.244
Marco Luciano	27	76	10	16	5	1	0	3	0	5	.211	.303
Mark Canha	32	73	4	21	3	0	0	4	3	9	.288	.329
David Villar	11	35	3	9	4	0	1	4	0	1	.257	.457
Tom Murphy	13	34	3	4	1	0	1	2	0	4	.118	.235
Blake Sabol	11	32	3	10	2	0	0	1	0	5	.313	.375
Trenton Brooks	12	25	3	3	0	0	0	1	1	4	.120	.120
Donovan Walton	9	22	3	3	0	0	1	2	0	2	.136	.273
Jakson Reetz	6	14	1	2	1	0	1	1	0	1	.143	.429
Derek Hill	5	12	3	3	0	1	0	2	0	1	.250	.417
Andrew Knapp	3	6	0	1	0	0	0	0	0	0	.167	.167
Ryan McKenna	4	6	1	0	0	0	0	0	1	0	.000	.000
Team totals	162	5460	693	1303	266	30	177	661	68	492	.239	.396

Source:Baseball Reference

=== Pitching ===
Note: W = Wins; L = Losses; ERA = Earned run average; G = Games pitched; GS = Games started; SV = Saves; IP = Innings pitched; H = Hits allowed; R = Runs allowed; ER = Earned runs allowed; BB = Walks allowed; SO = Strikeouts

Player	W	L	ERA	G	GS	SV	IP	H	R	ER	BB	SO
Logan Webb	13	10	3.47	33	33	0	204.2	202	83	79	50	172
Kyle Harrison	7	7	4.56	24	24	0	124.1	125	65	63	42	118
Jordan Hicks	4	7	4.10	29	20	1	109.2	112	54	50	47	96
Blake Snell	5	3	3.12	20	20	0	104.0	65	38	36	44	145
Sean Hjelle	3	4	3.90	58	0	0	80.2	84	37	35	14	75
Ryan Walker	10	4	1.91	76	1	10	80.0	50	19	17	18	99
Hayden Birdsong	5	6	4.75	16	16	0	72.0	57	39	38	43	88
Tyler Rogers	3	4	2.82	77	0	1	70.1	67	23	22	6	51
Erik Miller	4	5	3.88	73	10	0	67.1	50	33	29	38	87
Taylor Rogers	1	4	2.40	64	0	0	60.0	53	22	16	22	64
Camilo Doval	5	3	4.88	62	0	23	59.0	54	35	32	39	78
Keaton Winn	3	8	7.16	12	12	0	55.1	56	44	44	20	48
Randy Rodríguez	3	2	4.30	35	1	0	52.1	47	29	25	18	53
Landen Roupp	1	2	3.58	23	4	0	50.1	43	21	20	26	47
Spencer Bivens	3	1	3.14	27	2	1	48.2	47	20	17	11	37
Mason Black	1	5	6.44	9	8	0	36.1	46	26	26	15	31
Luke Jackson	4	2	5.40	36	0	0	35.0	35	22	21	15	33
Robbie Ray	3	2	4.70	7	7	0	30.2	20	16	16	15	43
Spencer Howard	1	1	5.63	7	2	0	24.0	33	16	15	11	21
Tristan Beck	0	0	1.69	7	1	0	16.0	14	3	3	4	14
Nick Avila	1	0	8.49	8	0	0	11.2	17	12	11	3	14
Kai-Wei Teng	0	0	9.82	4	0	0	11.0	15	12	12	8	7
Austin Warren	0	0	1.69	6	0	0	10.2	9	2	2	5	7
Mitch White	0	0	11.81	3	0	0	5.1	8	7	7	5	1
Daulton Jeffries	0	2	17.36	2	1	0	4.2	14	13	9	2	4
Trevor McDonald	0	0	0.00	1	0	0	3.0	0	0	0	1	1
Tyler Fitzgerald	0	0	9.00	3	0	0	3.0	6	3	3	0	0
Mike Yastrzemski	0	0	18.00	1	0	0	1.0	2	2	2	3	0
Donovan Walton	0	0	0.00	1	0	0	1.0	2	0	0	0	0
Raymond Burgos	0	0	9.00	1	0	0	1.0	3	1	1	1	1
Mike Baumann	0	0	27.00	1	0	0	0.2	3	2	2	0	1
Team totals	80	82	4.10	162	162	36	1433.2	1339	699	653	526	1436

Source:Baseball Reference

== Farm system ==
Level	Team	League	Division	Manager	Record Type	Record	through
AAA	Sacramento River Cats	Pacific Coast League	West	Dave Brundage			
AA	Richmond Flying Squirrels	Eastern League	Southwest	Dennis Pelfrey			
High-A	Eugene Emeralds	Northwest League	N/A	Carlos Valderrama			
Low-A	San Jose Giants	California League	North				
Rookie	ACL Giants Black	Arizona Complex League	East				
Rookie	ACL Giants Orange	Arizona Complex League	East				
Foreign Rookie	DSL Giants Black	Dominican Summer League	San Pedro				
Foreign Rookie	DSL Giants Orange	Dominican Summer League	Northeast				
