= Julia K. Munley =

American judge (born 1965)

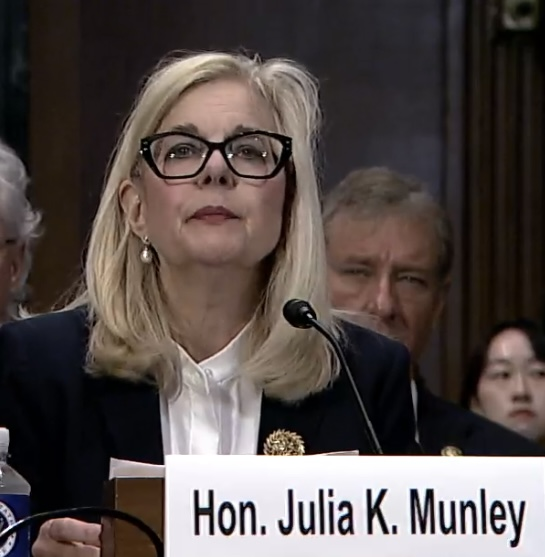
- Munley in 2023

Judge of the United States District Court for the Middle District of Pennsylvania
- Incumbent
- Assumed office November 7, 2023
- Appointed by: Joe Biden
- Preceded by: Robert D. Mariani

Judge of the Court of Common Pleas of Lackawanna County, 45th district
- In office July 1, 2016 – November 7, 2023
- Appointed by: Tom Wolf
- Preceded by: Robert Mazzoni

Personal details
- Born: Julia Kathleen Munley; 1965 (age 60–61) Carbondale, Pennsylvania, U.S.
- Party: Democratic
- Parent: James Martin Munley (father)
- Education: Marywood University (BA); Penn State Dickinson Law (JD)

Julia Kathleen Munley (born 1965) is an American judge who is serving as a United States district judge of the United States District Court for the Middle District of Pennsylvania. She previously served on the Lackawanna County Court of Common Pleas, 45th district.

== Education ==
Munley received a Bachelor of Arts from Marywood University in 1987 and a Juris Doctor from the Penn State Dickinson Law in 1992.

== Career ==
From 1992 to 1993, Munley served as a law clerk to Judge Stephen J. McEwen of the Pennsylvania Superior Court. From 1993 to 1995, she was an associate with Masterson, Braunfeld, Maguire & Brown and from 1995 to 2001 she was an associate at Mazzoni & Karam Law Offices in Scranton, Pennsylvania. From 2001 to 2016, she worked as a trial attorney and partner at Munley Law in Scranton. From 2016 to 2023, she served as a judge on the Court of Common Pleas of Lackawanna County in Pennsylvania's 45th Judicial District. She was appointed as a judge by Governor Tom Wolf to fill the vacancy left by the retirement of Judge Robert Mazzoni.

=== Federal judicial service ===
On May 3, 2023, President Joe Biden announced his intent to nominate Munley to serve as a United States district judge of the United States District Court for the Middle District of Pennsylvania. On May 4, 2023, her nomination was sent to the Senate. President Biden nominated Munley to the seat vacated by Judge Robert D. Mariani, who assumed senior status on September 30, 2022. On June 7, 2023, a hearing on her nomination was held before the Senate Judiciary Committee. On July 20, 2023, her nomination was reported out of committee by a 12–9 vote. On October 17, 2023, the United States Senate invoked cloture on her nomination by a 52–43 vote. Her nomination was confirmed later that day by a 52–45 vote. She received her judicial commission on November 7, 2023, and was sworn in on the same day.

== Personal life ==
Julia Munley is the daughter of the late Judge James Martin Munley and Dr. Kathleen P. Munley, a professor at Marywood University. She is married to attorney Patrick Rogan and lives in Clarks Summit, Pennsylvania. Her paternal grandmother was Marion L. Munley, one of the first women elected to the Pennsylvania House of Representatives.

Legal offices
Preceded by Robert D. Mariani	Judge of the United States District Court for the Middle District of Pennsylvania; 2023–present	Incumbent
