= Valley View High School (Pennsylvania) =

Coordinates: 41.4992°N 75.5575°W

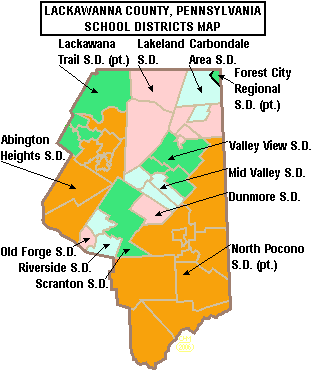

Location
- 1 Columbus Drive; Archbald, Lackawanna County, Pennsylvania 18403; United States

Information
- School type: Secondary
- Established: 1969
- School district: Valley View School District
- Principal: Lawrence Pegula
- Teaching staff: 54.40 (FTE)
- Grades: 9th-12th
- Enrollment: 735 (2023–2024)
- Student to teacher ratio: 13.51
- Colors: Blue, Gold, and White
- Mascot: Cougar
- Feeder schools: Valley View Middle School
- Website: https://vvhs.valleyviewsd.org/en-US

Valley View High School is a suburban public high school located in Archbald, Pennsylvania. It is the sole high school operated by the Valley View School District. In 2014, enrollment was reported as 800 pupils in 9th through 12th grades. The school employed 52 teachers.

Valley View High School students may choose to attend the Career Technology Center of Lackawanna County (CTCLC) for training in the construction and mechanical trades. The Northeastern Educational Intermediate Unit IU19 provides the school with a wide variety of services like specialized education for disabled students and hearing, background checks for employees, state mandated recognizing and reporting child abuse training, speech and visual disability services and professional development for staff and faculty.

== History ==
The Valley View School District was established in 1969 after the schools of Archbald, Blakely, and Jessup decided to combine and form a larger school. A contest was held to name the school throughout Archbald and Blakely. The cougar was chosen as the mascot and the colors became blue, gold, and white.

== Extracurricular activities ==
The school has numerous clubs including the ski club, SADD, PTSA, chess club, drama club, Future Business Leaders of America, Leo Club, as well as Spanish, French, and Italian clubs.

Music, drama, and the arts are very prominent at Valley View. Many students have participated in Pennsylvania Music Educators Association (PMEA) festivals and have won music awards. The school is known for its excellent spring musicals.

=== Athletics ===
Varsity

Boys

- Baseball – AAA
- Basketball- AAA
- Cross Country – AA
- Football – AAA
- Golf – AAA
- Soccer – AA
- Swimming and Diving – AA
- Tennis – AA
- Track and Field – AA
- Wrestling – AA

Girls

- Basketball – AAA
- Cross Country – AA
- Golf – AAA
- Soccer (Fall) – AA
- Softball – AAA
- Swimming and Diving – AA
- Girls' Tennis – AAA
- Track and Field – AA
- Color Guard

Middle School Sports

Boys

- Baseball
- Basketball
- Cross Country
- Football
- Soccer
- Track and Field
- Wrestling

Girls

- Basketball
- Cross Country
- Softball
- Track and Field

According to PIAA directory July 2015

Valley View's athletic teams have a long history of achievement on the local and state levels. Most recently, the Valley View Lady Cougars softball team won the 2013 Class AAA state championship at State College against Fort LeBoeuf under head coach EJ Weston. This championship marked the culmination of a 20-0 season and earned the Lady Cougars a 27th national ranking. The girls' softball team was also state champion in 2000 under coach James Delonti. The school's football team was state champion in 1992 under coaches Frank Pazzaglia and Tom Krempasky. The boys' basketball team was state runner-up in 1996 under coach Frank Nicolosi. The school's girls' basketball team was state runner-up in 1986 under coach Lou Camoni. The girls' soccer team has won four district championships and the boys' soccer team captured their own district championship in 2006. In 2010, the Valley View Cougars football team beat the Berwick Bulldogs 35-21 to capture the Eastern Conference Class AAA Championship. The school also has dedicated baseball, swimming/diving, and track and field teams.

In 2004, Valley View spent nearly $4 million to update its football stadium in Peckville, Pennsylvania, and add new track and field facilities to the campus in Archbald. The football field surface was changed from grass to artificial turf, the bleachers were changed from wood to metal, the surrounding gravel parking lot was paved, and the concession stands were rebuilt and repositioned. The renovations allowed for more parking and a bigger seating area for spectators.

All of Valley View's football games plus a select number of soccer, basketball, baseball and softball games are broadcast over the Internet on the Cougar Sports Network which can be found at VVCougars.com.

== In popular culture ==
Valley View High School is referenced numerous times in the U.S television series The Office. Prominent characters Pam Beesly (Jenna Fischer), Darryl Philbin (Craig Robinson), and Meredith Palmer (Kate Flannery) are alumni of Valley View. A fictionalized version of the school's gymnasium served as host of a job fair in the fourth-season episode "Job Fair." Also, a Cougar football helmet is featured in several episodes. Valley View High School also appears on Pam's resume in season nine episode, "Moving On."

== Notable alumni ==
- William R. Evanina, the National Counterintelligence Executive of the United States and director of the U.S. National Counterintelligence and Security Center
- Max Kranick, MLB baseball player
- Kyle J. Mullins. American politician. A Democrat representing District 112 in the Pennsylvania House of Representatives.
- Mason Black, MLB baseball player
