= Robert W. Munley =

American politician (1906–1947)

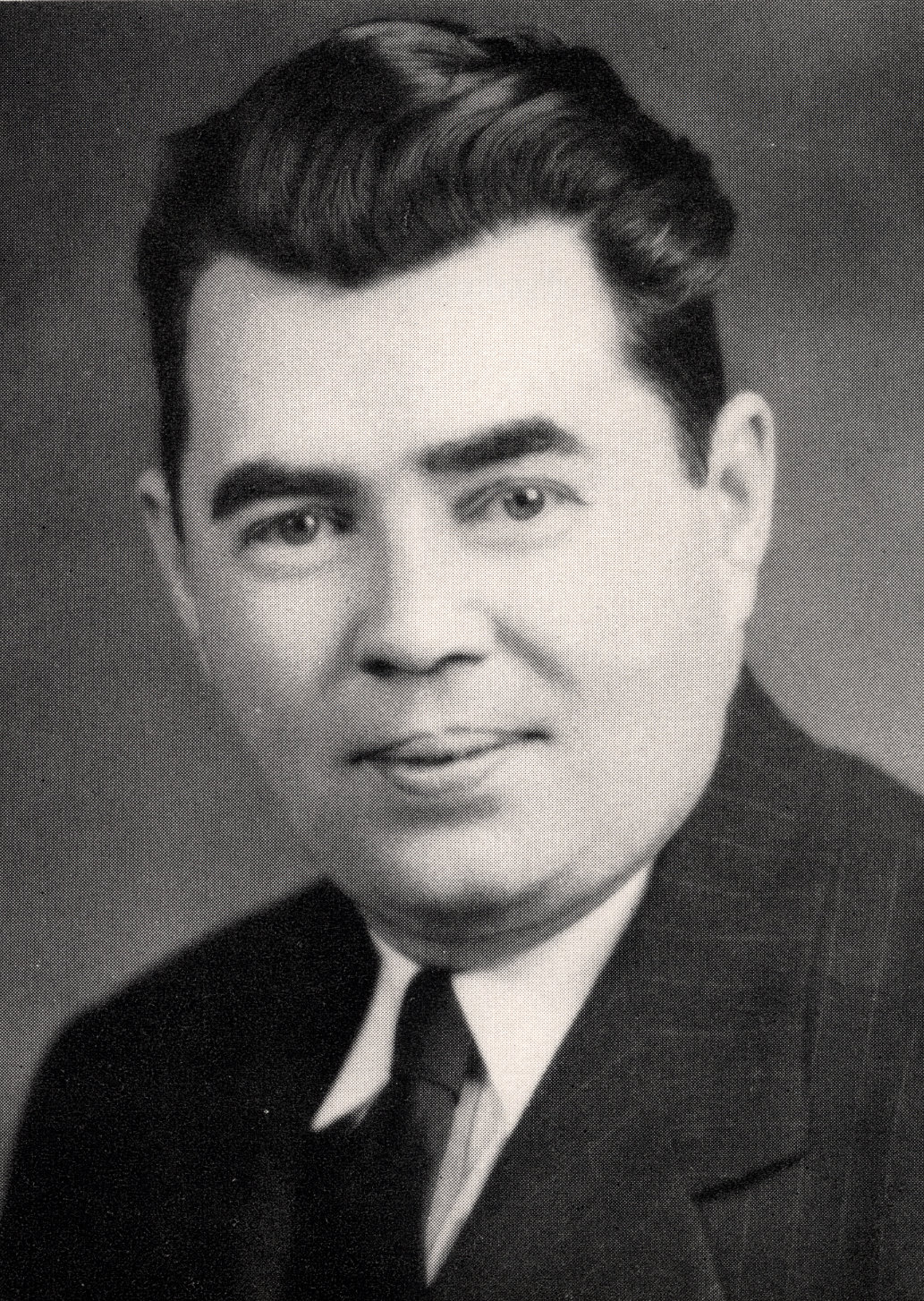
- Robert W. Munley
- Born: 16 April 1906; Archbald, PA
- Died: January 25, 1947 (aged 40)
- Occupation: Politician

Robert W. Munley (April 16, 1906 – January 25, 1947) was an American politician. He served in the Pennsylvania House of Representatives for five consecutive terms until his death in 1947.

== Life ==
Munley was born in Archbald, Pennsylvania to William J. Munley, a state Representative, and Winifred Munley (née Clark). He attended St. Thomas College (now the University of Scranton) and worked for the Internal Revenue Service as a deputy collector from 1933 to 1938.

When his father died suddenly from a stroke in 1938, Munley was elected to the Pennsylvania House of Representatives in 1939. He was re-elected to serve four more consecutive terms. After being re-elected to a fifth term, Munley suffered a heart attack and died at his home in Archbald, Pennsylvania.

Following his death, his wife Marion L. Munley won a special election to become the first woman to represent Lackawanna County in the state house.

Munley had two sons: James Martin Munley who served as a United States District Judge and Robert W. Munley Jr, a prominent truck accident attorney.

Munley was a self-taught musician and a boxing fan. He served for many years as a deputy boxing commissioner for the Pennsylvania Athletic Commission.

=== Political career ===
Following in his late father's footsteps, Munley supported organized labor. While in the House, he introduced and supported many measures that were backed by union labor.

Before his death, Munley had drafted by which the Commonwealth would provide financial assistance to the anthracite's region industrial rehabilitation effort.
