= Mary Adrian Barrett =

American religious sister and educator

- Born: Dorothy Marie Barrett; February 14, 1929; Scranton, Pennsylvania, U.S.
- Died: October 12, 2015 (aged 86); Scranton
- Education: Marywood University; St. John's University
- Organization: Sisters, Servants of the Immaculate Heart of Mary

Mary Adrian Barrett, IHM, born Dorothy Marie Barrett, (February 14, 1929 – October 12, 2015), was an American religious sister of the Sisters, Servants of the Immaculate Heart of Mary, an educator and the founder of Friends of the Poor, a nonprofit organization based in Scranton, Pennsylvania.

== Early life and education ==
Dorothy Marie Barrett was born in 1929 in Scranton and raised in Dunmore, Pennsylvania, one of five children of Paul Adrian Barrett and Mildred Padden. Her father was a newspaper editor who made a point of teaching his children compassion and responsibility for less fortunate people.

== Religious life ==
At 17, Barrett joined the congregation of the Sisters, Servants of Immaculate Heart of Mary. Taking the religious name Mary Adrian, she made her temporary vows on 9 May, 1949, and her perpetual vows on 2 August, 1952. She earned an undergraduate degree in history and English from Marywood University, and later a master's degree in African-American history from St. John's University in Queens, New York.

As a teacher, Barrett served at Catholic schools in West Pittston, Pennsylvania; Carbondale, Pennsylvania; Silver Spring, Maryland; Williamsport, Pennsylvania; and Oyster Bay, New York, as well as other locations. While teaching in Oyster Bay, she became chairwoman of the town's Democratic Committee and leader of the Community Social Action Council, working for better low-income housing on Long Island.

In 1970, Barrett was visiting Scranton on a break from teaching when she co-founded Project Hope, a summer camp for children without other summer recreation opportunities. In 1976, she returned to the Scranton area permanently, working with the United Neighborhood Centers on programming for children, poor and elderly residents of the area. Barrett was noted for organizing activities for poor families in Scranton, such as bus trips to Washington D. C. and holiday dinners, intended to give parents and children memorable and educational experiences together. She arranged funerals for destitute families, and advocated for mothers with addictions in the court system. Sister Adrian founded Friends of the Poor in 1984, as a sponsored ministry of her order. "To work with the poor is a great gift," she explained. "The poor teach you a lot."

In 1985, Barrett was the subject of a public television documentary, Sister Adrian, the Mother Teresa of Scranton, narrated by Martin Sheen. She called the film "a bit much", and rejected the comparison to Mother Teresa.

Among her honors, Barrett held honorary doctorates from Marywood College and the University of Scranton. She was appointed to the Pennsylvania Commission on Aging by Governor Robert P. Casey, and in 1986 was the first woman to be grand marshal of the Scranton's St. Patrick's Day Parade. In 2002, Arlen Specter recognized her work in a speech on the floor of the U. S. Senate. Later, in 2009, Congressman Paul Kanjorski also spoke about her in the House of Representatives, to mark her official retirement.

Barrett stood just under five feet tall. She was known to prefer casual clothing in her work — earning her the nickname "Sister Sneakers" — but she often wore tailored tartan ensembles in formal situations. In 2008, Barrett was active in support of the Obama presidential campaign in Lackawanna County, Pennsylvania.

Barrett died in October 2015, age 86, at the retirement home in Scranton for the members of her congregation. A memorial service was held at her alma mater, Marywood University. Both Project Hope and Friends of the Poor continued to serve local needs at the time of her death. Camp Saint Andrew, however, the site of Project Hope's summer camp, was closed by the Diocese of Scranton in 2015. In November 2015, the first Thanksgiving after her death, Friends of the Poor held the annual Thanksgiving dinner started by Barrett in 1977, and expected to serve well over 1,000 holiday meals. Her sister, Marie D. Barrett, wrote a biography of her, which was self-published, in 2004, titled Sister Sneakers.
