= William J. Munley =

American politician

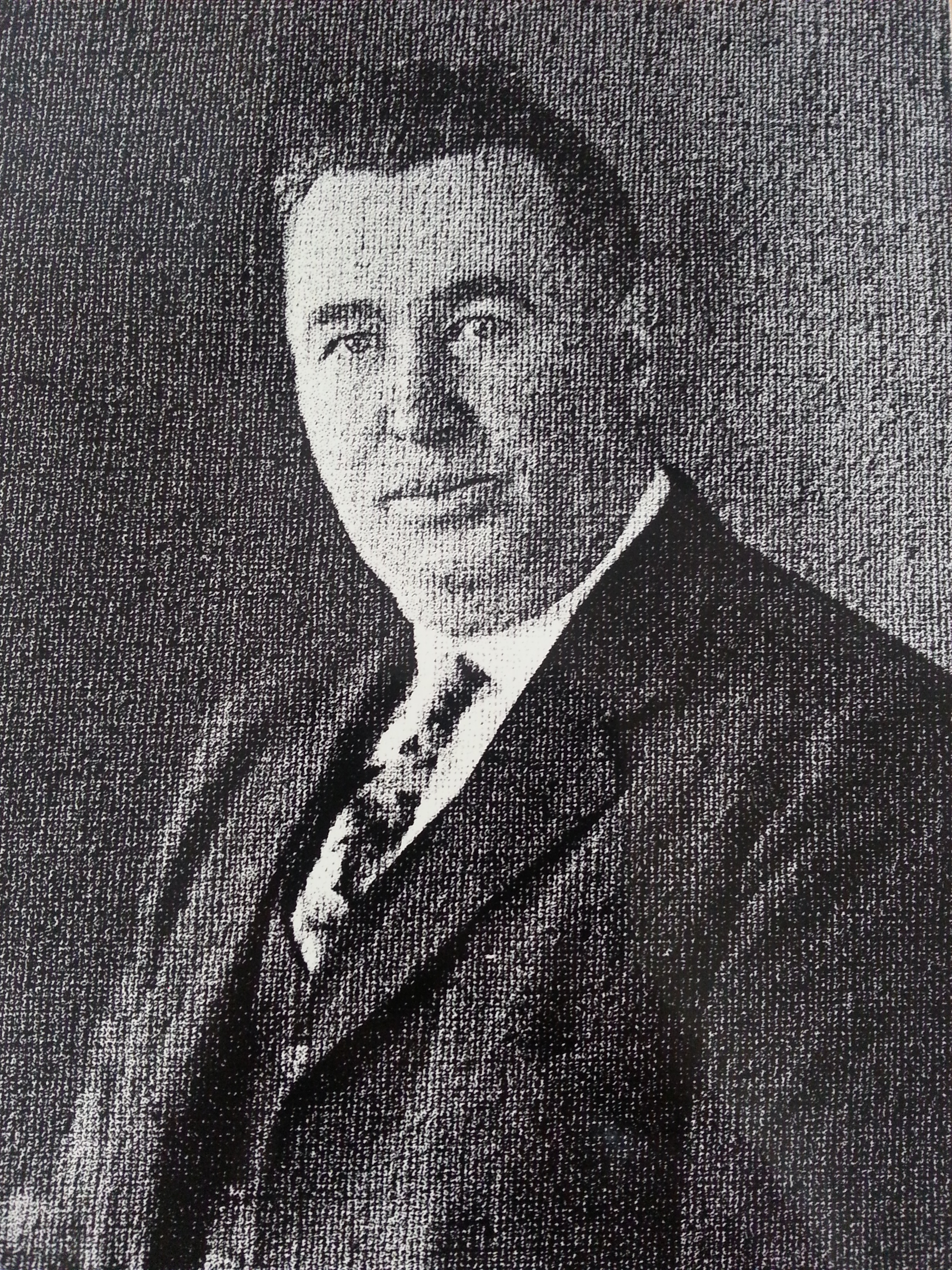
- William J. Munley
- Born: 6 January 1883; Archbald, PA
- Died: March 9, 1938 (aged 55)
- Occupation: Politician

William J. Munley (January 6, 1883 – March 9, 1938) was an American politician. He served eight consecutive terms in the Pennsylvania House of Representatives until his sudden death in 1938.

== Life ==
William J. Munley was born in Archbald, Pennsylvania on January 6, 1883 and went to the Archbald local schools. At the age of 8, he started working in the mines. He was employed by the Scranton Transit Company on March 4, 1908 as a conductor for the Carbondale lines. In 1927, he became the supervisor of the Carbondale division which he held until the Carbondale line was abandoned several years later.

His son Robert W. Munley and daughter-in-law Marion L. Munley also served in the Pennsylvania General Assembly.

His grandsons were James Martin Munley, served as a United States District Court judge, and Robert W. Munley Jr., the founder of Munley Law Personal Injury Attorneys.

=== Political career ===
While living in Mayfield, Pennsylvania, in 1918, Munley held his first political office when he was elected as borough auditor. His next forray into politics occurred in 1922 when he was elected to the Pennsylvania House of Representatives, succeeding Rep. Will Jones. Munley was reelected to the House to serve seven consecutive terms thereafter.

A member of the Scranton division of the Street Car Men's Union, Munley took an active hand in any legislation that was sponsored by organized labor, and was soon recognized a labor leader in the lower branch. He was also instrumental in the creation of the highways that ran through his district.

== Death ==
Munley died while in office, on March 9, 1938, in Scranton, Pennsylvania after suffering a paralytic stroke while attending a wrestling match in Archbald.
