= Mary Persico =

American nun and academic administrator

Mary Persico is an American nun and academic administrator who served as the 12th president of Marywood University from 2016 to 2024.

== Life ==
Persico is from Hazleton, Pennsylvania. She earned a B.A. in French and education Marywood University before joining the Sisters, Servants of the Immaculate Heart of Mary. She completed a M.A. in French at Assumption College. She received a M.A. in education administration and an Ed.D. in education leadership from Lehigh University.

Persico was an executive vice president of Trinity Health. She was the principal of Holy Cross Preparatory Academy and Notre Dame High School. She was an adjunct professor at Marywood University. She was named the incoming president of the university in April 2016. She succeeded Anne Munley in July 2016 as the 12th president. She retired on June 30, 2024, and was succeeded by Lisa Lori.
