= Robert D. Mariani =

American judge (born 1950)

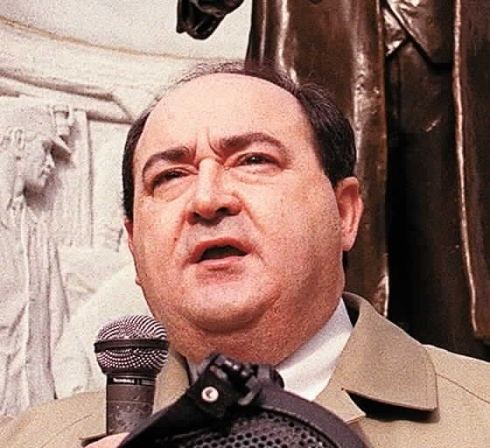

Senior Judge of the United States District Court for the Middle District of Pennsylvania
- Incumbent
- Assumed office September 30, 2022

Judge of the United States District Court for the Middle District of Pennsylvania
- In office October 19, 2011 – September 30, 2022
- Appointed by: Barack Obama
- Preceded by: James Martin Munley
- Succeeded by: Julia K. Munley

Personal details
- Born: Robert Eugene Mariani; April 16, 1950 (age 76) Scranton, Pennsylvania, U.S.
- Education: Villanova University (AB); Syracuse University (JD)

Robert David Mariani (born Robert Eugene Mariani, April 16, 1950) is an American lawyer and labor advocate who now serves as a senior United States district judge of the United States District Court for the Middle District of Pennsylvania.

== Early life and education ==
Born in Scranton, Pennsylvania, Mariani earned an Artium Baccalaureus degree in 1972 from Villanova University and a Juris Doctor in 1976 from Syracuse University College of Law.

== Career ==
Out of law school, Mariani worked for three years (from 1976 until 1979) at a Scranton law firm. He then worked as a partner at another Scranton law firm from 1979 until 1993. From 1993 until his confirmation, Mariani was a lawyer in sole private practice in Scranton, specializing in labor and employment law.

=== Labor representation ===
Mariani spent the majority of his career representing unions and employees in labor and employment matters. In his practice, he represented the Teamsters, food workers, stagehands, iron workers, and steel workers. Mariani was inspired by his personal experiences with organized labor through his father's work as a carpenter and grandfather's work as a coal miner.

=== Federal judicial service ===
On December 1, 2010, President Barack Obama nominated Mariani to a vacant judicial seat on the United States District Court for the Middle District of Pennsylvania that previously had been held by Judge James Martin Munley, who assumed senior status in January 2009. Mariani never received a Judiciary Committee hearing before the end of 2010, and his nomination lapsed at the end of the year.

Obama renominated Mariani on January 5, 2011. The American Bar Association rated Mariani Unanimously Qualified for the nomination. On July 21, 2011, the Senate Judiciary Committee reported his nomination out of committee. On October 19, 2011, the United States Senate confirmed his nomination by an 82–17 vote. He received his commission that same day. He assumed senior status on September 30, 2022, but maintains an active docket.

Legal offices
Preceded by James Martin Munley	Judge of the United States District Court for the Middle District of Pennsylvania; 2011–2022	Succeeded by Julia K. Munley
