= Lisa Lori =

American lawyer and academic administrator

Lisa A. Lori is an American lawyer and academic administrator who is currently serving as the 13th president of Marywood University.

== Life ==
Lori is from Greater Pittston and graduated from the Wyoming Seminary. She earned a B.S. in fashion design from Marywood University in 1993. She completed a J.D., cum laude, and a LL.M. in trial advocacy from the Temple University Beasley School of Law.

In 2014, Lori joined the board of trustees of Marywood University. In April 2024, she was named as the incoming 13th president of Marywood University. She is the first lay person selected to serve as president. Lori succeeded Mary Persico on July 1, 2024.
