= Valley View School District (Pennsylvania) =

School district in Pennsylvania, U.S.

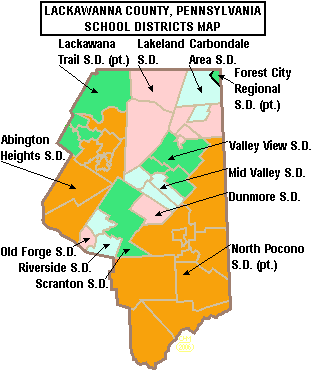

Address
- 1 Columbus Drive Archbald, Lackawanna County, Pennsylvania, 18403; United States

District information
- Type: Public
- Grades: K–12

Students and staff
- District mascot: Cougar
- Colors: Gold, white, and blue

Other information
- Website: www.valleyviewsd.org

The Valley View School District is a small, suburban public school district located in Archbald, Lackawanna County, Pennsylvania. The school district serves: the boroughs of Archbald, Blakely, Jessup, the Peckville section of Blakely borough, and the Eynon section of Archbald borough, which are suburbs of Scranton. Valley View School District encompasses approximately 27 square miles (70 km^{2}). According to 2004 local census data, it served a resident population of 17,715. By 2010, the district's population increased to 18,218 people. The educational attainment levels for the school district population (25 years old and over) were 88.7% high school graduates and 22.2% college graduates. The district is one of the 500 public school districts of Pennsylvania.

According to the Pennsylvania Budget and Policy Center, 29.4% of the district's pupils lived at 185% or below the Federal Poverty Level as shown by their eligibility for the federal free or reduced price school meal programs in 2012. In 2009, Valley View School Districts' per capita income was $18,247, while the median family income was $48,966 a year. In the Commonwealth, the median family income was $49,501 and the United States median family income was $49,445, in 2010. In Lackawanna County, the median household income was $43,673. By 2013, the median household income in the United States rose to $52,100. In 2014, the median household income in the USA was $53,700.

Valley View School District operates four schools: Valley View Elementary Center (grades K-2), Valley View Intermediate School (grades 3–5), Valley View Middle School (grades 6–8), and Valley View High School (Pennsylvania) (grades 9–12). Valley View High School students may choose to attend the Career Technology Center of Lackawanna County (CTCLC) for training in the construction and mechanical trades. The Northeastern Educational Intermediate Unit IU19 provides the district with a wide variety of services like specialized education for disabled students and hearing, background checks for employees, state mandated recognizing and reporting child abuse training, speech and visual disability services and professional development for staff and faculty.
