= Marywood University =

Catholic university in Scranton, Pennsylvania, US

- Former name: Marywood College (1915–1997)
- Motto: Sanctitas Scientia Sanitas (Latin)
- Motto in English: "Holiness, Knowledge, Health"
- Type: Private university
- Established: September 8, 1915; 111 years ago
- Accreditation: MSCHE
- Affiliations: Roman Catholic (Sisters, Servants of the Immaculate Heart of Mary)
- Academic affiliations: ACCU; CIC; NAICU
- President: Lisa Lori
- Students: As of Fall 2025, Marywood enrolled 3,124 students across domestic and international programs. (fall 2025)
- Undergraduates: 2,020 (fall 2025)
- Postgraduates: 1,104 (fall 2025)
- Location: Scranton, Pennsylvania, United States; 41.4337°N 75.6342°W
- Campus: 115 acres (0.47 km^{2}); Small city
- Newspaper: The Wood Word
- Colors: Forest green, gold and white
- Nickname: Pacers
- Sporting affiliations: NCAA Division III – Middle Atlantic Conference
- Mascot: Pacers
- Website: marywood.edu
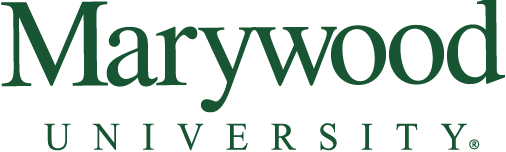

Marywood University is a private Catholic university in Scranton and Dunmore, Pennsylvania, United States. Established in 1915 by the Sisters, Servants of the Immaculate Heart of Mary, Marywood currently enrolls more than 2,800 students in a variety of undergraduate, graduate, and doctoral programs. The university has a national arboretum with more than 100 types of trees and shrubs.

== History ==
The Sisters, Servants of the Immaculate Heart of Mary came to Scranton, Pennsylvania, and established St. Cecilia's Academy in 1878 "for young ladies". Mount St. Mary's Seminary opened in 1902. Mother M. Cyril Conway, IHM superior in 1901, deliberately chose the term "seminary" (roughly equivalent to a high school in present times) to avoid the suggestion of a finishing school – a much more common destination at that time for older girls who could afford to continue their education – as it was intended to be "a place where young scholars dedicated themselves to serious study". The Motherhouse was co-located with the seminary. Its buildings suffered major damage during a fire in the 1970s. As a result, the Jesuit Scranton Preparatory School, then a boys' school, became co-educational to accommodate the girls. An entrance arch, now known as "Memorial Arch", still stands on the present-day campus and the former seminary's name can be seen engraved on it.

The seminary was the next step to the sisters' ultimate goal: to open a women's college in Scranton. Marywood College opened on September 8, 1915 with 34 students. Germaine O'Neil served as the first president and treasurer. It was the fifth Catholic women's college in the United States. The first batch of students graduated in 1919 with a Bachelor of Arts, Bachelor of Science, or Bachelor of Letters. By the 1930s, the college had diversified its curriculum, offering subjects ranging from the social sciences to pre-medical. In 1937, the sisters turned down an invitation to merge with St. Thomas College, then under the Christian Brothers. St. Thomas later came under the administration of the Jesuits after World War II and is now the University of Scranton.

By the 1970s, other single-sex Catholic colleges and universities in the diocese such as College Misericordia and King's College were becoming co-educational and Marywood followed suit, opening its doors to male students in the fall of 1989. In 1997, the college was granted university status by the Pennsylvania Department of Education, officially becoming Marywood University.

== Campus ==
Over half the campus is located in Dunmore. The remainder is in Scranton.

== Academics ==
Marywood's programs are administered through four degree-granting colleges, with 60 bachelor's degree, 36 master's degree, two doctoral degrees, two terminal degrees by program (MFA, Ed.S.). All students are required to complete a core curriculum in the liberal arts in addition to the courses in their major. Undergraduates may also enroll in double majors, honors, and independent study programs, practicums, internships, and study abroad, as well as Army and Air Force ROTC programs.

Marywood students may cross-register for up to six credits per year at the University of Scranton, or limited courses at Immaculata University and Lackawanna College.

The university is structured into two colleges:

- College of Health Sciences
  - Departments:
    - Communication Sciences & Disorders
    - Health, Nutrition, and Exercise Science
    - Nursing, Respiratory Therapy and Healthcare Administration
    - Physician Assistant
    - Psychology and Counseling
    - Science, Math, and Computer Science
  - Schools:
    - Social Work
- College of Professional Studies
  - Departments:
    - Art
    - English and Modern Languages
    - Music
    - Nonprofit Leadership and Public Management
    - Ph.D. Strategic Leadership and Administrative Studies
    - Philosophy and Religious Studies
    - Social Sciences
  - Schools:
    - Architecture
    - Business and Global Innovation
    - Communication
    - Education
    - Humanities
    - Visual and Performing Arts

== Campus buildings and landmarks ==
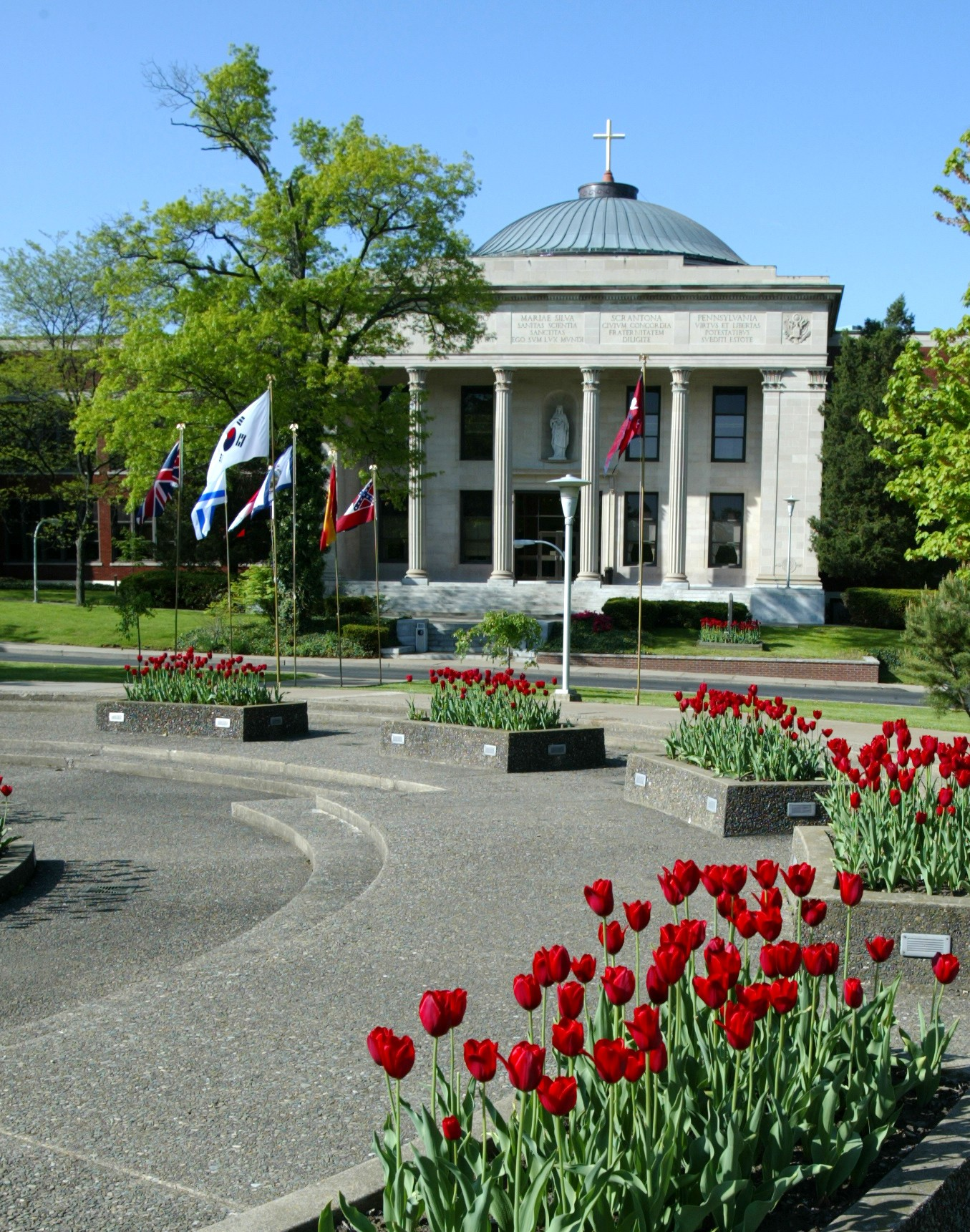
The Liberal Arts Center, completed in 1923, is crowned with one of the campus' most distinctive architectural features, the dome of the Rotunda. foreground, Memorial Commons

Marywood University is home to about 20 different buildings on its campus, including the following:

- The Center for Natural and Health Sciences houses several academic departments, including Mathematics, Science, Nursing, and Administrative Studies.
- The Swartz Center for Spiritual Life, opened in 2007, contains the Marian Chapel, Campus Ministry, and Conference and Event Services.
- Immaculata Hall was built in the 1950s. It was originally called Alumnae Hall, and it was renamed to honor Sister M. Immaculata Gillespie, Marywood's first dean. It houses the President's Office and the Office of Planning and Institutional Research.
- The Insalaco Center for Studio Arts, completed in 2001, houses the Kresge Gallery and features drawing and painting studios. There are studios and equipment for woodworking, fiber arts, jewelry-making, ceramics, sculpture, photography, printmaking, a computer Mac lab, and private and semi-private studios for upper level BFA, MA, and MFA students.
- The Learning Commons is the library. It is also home to TV Marywood and VMFM-FM 91.7.
- The Liberal Arts Center houses many academic departments, including Religious Studies, Philosophy, Social Sciences, English, and Foreign Languages. The Admissions Office is also located here. The LAC also features the Marywood Rotunda.
- Maria Hall, one of the original campus structures, now houses the University Development/Advancement Office.
- The Center for Athletics and Wellness includes a 1,500-seat arena, a 5,000-square-foot (460 m^{2}) fitness center, and other athletic facilities. The center also includes the Aquatics Center; opened in 2011, it has an 8-lane NCAA regulation pool, 3-meter diving board, 1-meter diving boards, competition gutters, and seating for 200 spectators.
- The Memorial Arch, built in 1902, originally held the inscription "Mt. St. Mary's" and marked the entrance to the original Motherhouse, which was the location of Mt. St. Mary's seminary. The statue of the Virgin Mary on top of the arch is often referred to by students as the "Electric Mary" due to its halo encircled by light bulbs. The original stone steps to the Motherhouse are behind the arch.

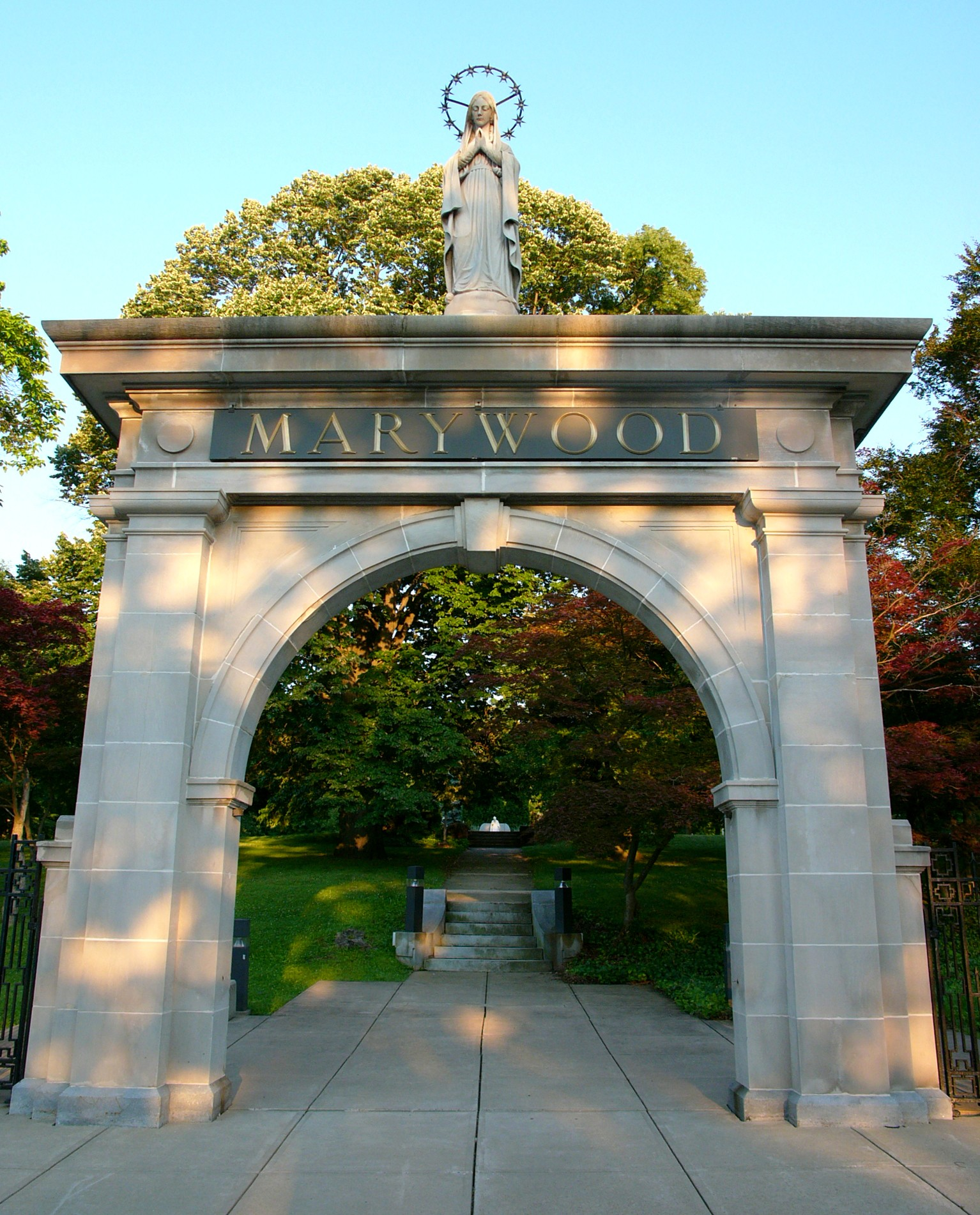
The Memorial Arch, built in 1902, marks the entrance to the original Motherhouse, which was the location of St. Mary's Seminary.

- The Michael and Gwen Calabro Delfino Amphitheatre, built in 2017, is an outdoor performing arts space with natural tiered lawn and is used for academics, staged art, outdoor exhibitions, and recreation.
- The Memorial Commons was built in 1975 as a memorial to the original IHM Motherhouse that burned down in 1971. The Memorial Commons was renovated during the construction of the Learning Commons and was renamed the Motherhouse and Seminary Morgan Memorial Garden, dedicated on Marywood's Centennial Anniversary, September 8, 2015.
- The Nazareth Student Center, built in 1964, houses the main dining room, a lounge, a game room, the university bookstore, the Office of Student Activities and Leadership Development, and other university offices.
- The O'Neill Center for Healthy Families, built in 2002, houses academic programs and research facilities. In 2024, the Pascucci Family Health Sciences Pavilion was added, further expanding Marywood's commitment to the Health Sciences and featuring simulation labs, exam rooms, and the latest equipment and technology.
- The Sette LaVerghetta Center for Performing Arts, built in the 1950s as Assumption Hall, was rededicated in honor of Sette LaVerghetta in 1998. It houses the Music, Theatre, and Dance department.
- The Center for Architectural Studies, completed in fall 2009, is a state-of-the-art example of sustainable design. It is a spacious, adaptive re-use of Marywood's former gymnasium. It has two levels of studios, a woodshop, a computer-aided design (CAD) laboratory, and a student lounge. It houses the region's first and only School of Architecture.
- The Shields Center for Visual Arts serves Marywood's art students. It has classroom space for the graphic design, illustration, art history, and art therapy programs, as well as a 24-hour drop-in Mac lab. It also houses three art galleries: Mahady Gallery, Suraci Gallery, and Maslow Study Gallery.
- The McGowan Center for Graduate and Professional Studies, renovated in 1998, was previously known as the Center for Human Services. It houses the College of Professional Studies and the Counseling/Student Development Center.
- The Veterans Resource Center, currently located on the first floor of the Learning Commons, including office space in LC 166 and the adjoining lounge area, houses the Office of Military and Veteran Services and provides a gathering place for the Student Veteran Alliance.

== Housing ==
- Loughran Hall is a residence hall for freshman students only and accommodates up to 324.
- Madonna Hall is an upperclassmen residence hall with co-educational floors.
- Regina Hall, originally named O'Reilly Hall, was the first student residence built at Marywood in the late 1920s. After the Motherhouse was destroyed by fire in 1971, the area that had once been the formal dining room was converted for use as a chapel. The chapel was then converted to what is now the Liguori Center. Regina Hall is still a residence hall today.
- Immaculata Hall (Closed) originally built in the 1950s and named Alumnae Hall, was later renamed Immaculata Hall to honor Sister M. Immaculata Gillespie, Marywood's first dean. Immaculata has two floors of single-room dorms for resident students.
- Emmanuel Hall (Closed) provides specialty housing for 25 upperclass students in primarily 4-person rooms. The residence includes a kitchen and large common area.
- Perpetual Help Hall (Closed) houses up to 14 male resident students. and includes a living room, kitchen, study area, and laundry room.
- McCarty Hall (Closed) dedicated in November 1941, was once used as a practice house for students majoring in vocational home economics. The hall burnt down and is no longer used for residents.
- The Woodland Residences provide apartment-style living for sophomores, juniors, and seniors. Each unit houses between four, five or ten upperclass students.

== Athletics ==
Marywood Pacers wordmark

Marywood University is an NCAA Division III school and member of the Atlantic East Conference. The official name given is the Marywood Pacers. Marywood competes at the varsity level in baseball, basketball, cross-country, field hockey, golf, lacrosse, rugby, soccer, softball, swimming and diving, tennis, track and field, and volleyball. Students may also choose from more than 30 intramural programs, including club sports, as well as fitness options, recreational classes, and activity clubs. Marywood University's Mascot's name is Maxis Gillet after the Founder of the IHM Sisters, Mother Theresa Maxis and their Chaplain, Fr. Louis Gillet.

== Arboretum ==
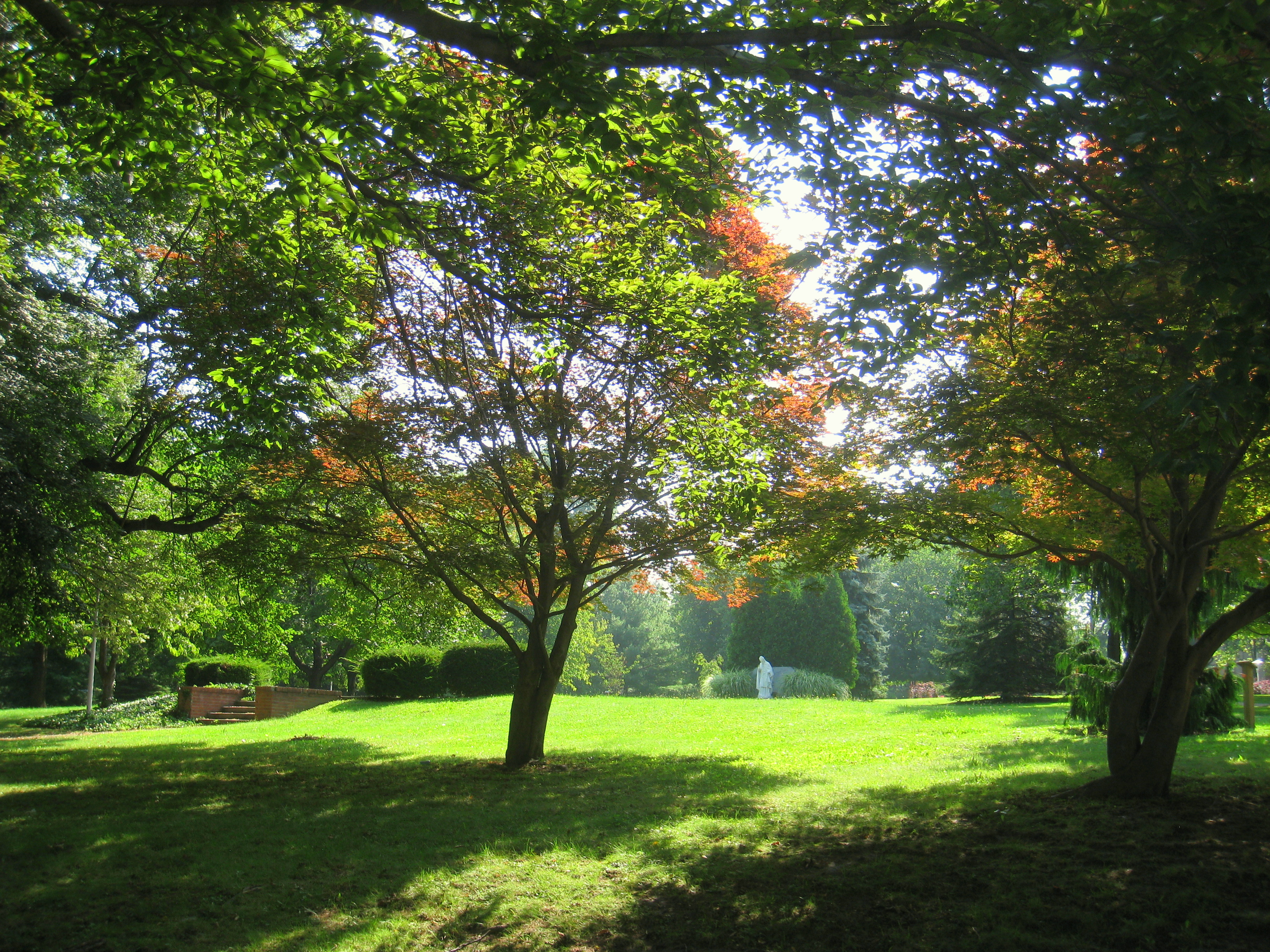
Marywood University Arboretum

Marywood University was declared an arboretum in 1975 in honor of Sister Maria Laurence Maher, then Professor of Biological Sciences, and received its official designation as such in 1997. It now contains 42 species of trees (103 varieties) and a comparable collection of shrubs, ornamental grasses, and flowers.

== Notable alumni ==
- Sister Adrian Barrett, Roman Catholic nun, educator, and social worker
- John Blake, politician
- Karen Boback, politician and educator
- Laura Boyd, politician
- Colette Cassidy, primetime newsbreak presenter for MSNBC
- Jean Dahlgren, American artist
- Mrs. Kasha Davis, notable drag queen and reality television personality
- Marty Flynn, politician
- Anne Healey, politician
- Herbert J. Hoelter, criminal justice consultant
- Jean Kerr, née Bridget Jean Collins, playwright and author, Please Don't Eat the Daisies.
- Michele Knotz, voice actress for anime such as Pokémon
- Joseph Kopacz, Catholic prelate
- Archbishop Joseph Kurtz, president of the U.S. Conference of Catholic Bishops
- Lisa Lori, lawyer and academic administrator
- Maureen Madden, politician
- Richard A. Moccia, politician
- Julia K. Munley, judge
- Marion L. Munley, politician
- Karen Murphy, nurse and hospital administrator
- Lee Namey (Master of Fine Arts, 1971), Mayor of Wilkes-Barre, Pennsylvania (1988-1996)
- Teresa Osborne, civil service professional
- Mary Persico, nun and academic administrator
- Jodi Salvo, politician
- Dora Adele Shoemaker, educator and poet
- Thomas Tigue, Marine Corps officer
- Ben Walsh and Adam McIlwee, guitarists for Tigers Jaw
