= Bachelor of Letters =

Academic degree

Bachelor of Letters (BLitt or LittB; Latin Baccalaureus Litterarum or Litterarum Baccalaureus) is a second bachelor's degree in which students specialize in an area of study relevant to their own personal, professional, or academic development. This area of study may have been touched on in a prior undergraduate degree but not studied in depth, or may never have been formally taught to the student. The degree is less often awarded now than in previous centuries, and is, at the current time, only awarded by two universities in Australia, four universities in Turkey, and several universities in Argentina.

== Australia ==
Although the BLitt degree was once awarded by many Australian universities, it is now awarded only by Flinders University and, until recently, the University of Western Australia. The BLitt was once offered by the Australian National University, Deakin University, Monash University, and the University of Melbourne.

== United Kingdom ==
The degree was awarded by the University of Oxford and a small number of other universities, including the University of Birmingham. It was still available at Oxford in 1977 though it has since been replaced by the more research-based Master of Letters degree. Unsuccessful candidates for the DPhil at Oxford were, certainly until the 1960s, offered the option of accepting the BLitt if they did not wish to revise their thesis in a further attempt to be admitted to the degree of DPhil. The verb "to BLitt" a candidate was sometimes used to indicate that the BLitt had been obtained via this route, hence, for example "He was BLitt-ed."

== United States ==
In the late 19th century the degree was awarded at the University of Michigan. During the early years, Marywood University, formerly a women's college, offered the degree. A degree of Bachelor of Arts in Letters has been awarded at the University of Oklahoma since 1937, when the school of Letters was organized in the College of Arts and Sciences.
