= Colette Cassidy =

American journalist

Colette Cassidy is a television news reporter, journalist, writer, and speaker.

== Career ==
Cassidy served as primetime newsbreak anchor for MSNBC as well as an occasional host of MSNBC Live. Previously, she was a reporter and weekend anchor at CBS station KYW-TV in Philadelphia, where she joined the station as a writer and producer in 1994. By December 1995, she had moved on to general assignment and in December 2002, she was promoted to the anchor seat.

== Personal ==
She is a New Jersey native, who was raised outside of Dublin, Ireland. She is a graduate of Marywood University in Scranton, Pennsylvania. Cassidy is an Alzheimer's awareness raising advocate and fundraises for the Alzheimer's Association.
