= Mason Black =

American baseball player (born 1999)

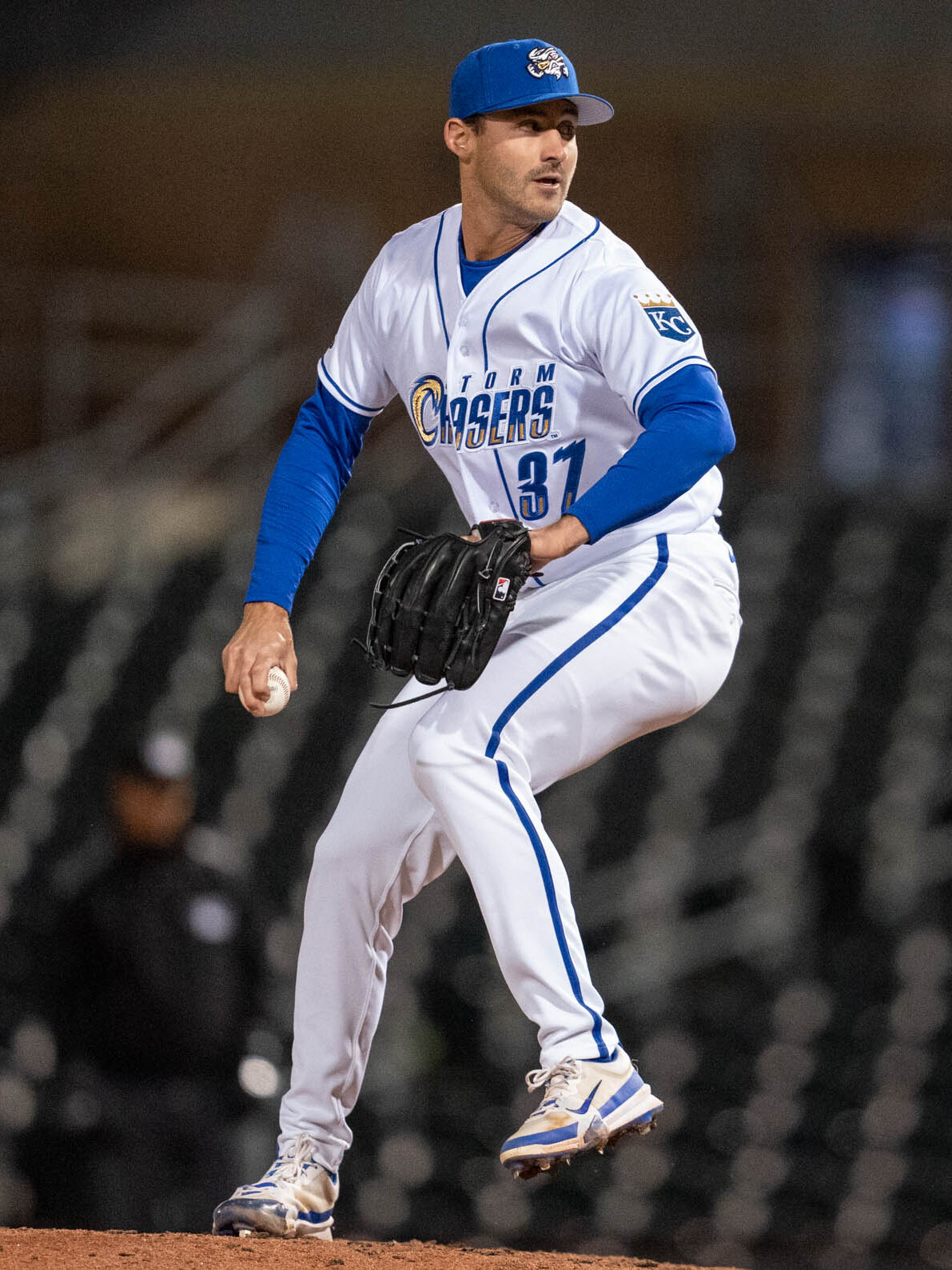
- Black with the Omaha Storm Chasers in 2026

Kansas City Royals
- Pitcher
- Born: December 10, 1999 (age 26); Scranton, Pennsylvania, U.S.
- Bats: Right Throws: Right

MLB debut
- May 6, 2024, for the San Francisco Giants

MLB statistics (through 2026 season)
- Win–loss record: 1–5
- Earned run average: 5.53
- Strikeouts: 55
- Stats at Baseball Reference

Teams
- San Francisco Giants (2024–2025); Kansas City Royals (2026)

Mason Peter Black (born December 10, 1999) is an American professional baseball pitcher in the Kansas City Royals organization. He has previously played in Major League Baseball (MLB) for the San Francisco Giants.

== Amateur career ==
Black grew up in Archbald, Pennsylvania, and attended Valley View High School. He finished his high school career with a 12–5 win–loss record and a 1.19 earned run average (ERA) with 123 strikeouts.

Black attended Lehigh University and played college baseball for the Lehigh Mountain Hawks for three seasons. After his freshman season in 2019, he played collegiate summer baseball for the Brewster Whitecaps of the Cape Cod Baseball League and was named a league all-star. Black had a 1–2 record with a 3.68 ERA in four starts before the 2020 season was cut short due to the coronavirus pandemic. During the summer he pitched for the Boca Raton Blazers of the South Florida Collegiate Baseball League. Black was named the Patriot League Pitcher of the Year after he went 7–3 with a 3.11 ERA and 95 strikeouts in 72 1/3 innings pitched during his junior season.

== Professional career ==
=== San Francisco Giants ===
The San Francisco Giants drafted Black in the third round, with the 85th overall selection, of the 2021 Major League Baseball draft. He was assigned to the San Jose Giants of Low-A California League at the beginning of the 2022 season. Between San Jose and the High–A Eugene Emeralds in 2022, Black was 6–4 with a 3.21 ERA in 24 starts over 112 innings in which he struck out 136 batters. He was named an MiLB Organization All Star. Black split the 2023 campaign between the Double-A Richmond Flying Squirrels and Triple-A Sacramento River Cats. In 29 starts for the two affiliates, he posted a combined 4-9 record and 3.71 ERA with 155 strikeouts across 123 2/3 innings pitched.

On May 6, 2024, Black was selected to the 40-man roster and promoted to the major leagues for the first time. He made his debut later that day as the Giants' starter against the Philadelphia Phillies, receiving a loss after allowing eight hits and five earned runs with four strikeouts in 4 1/3 innings pitched as San Francisco lost 6–1. He achieved his first MLB win when he pitched 5 2/3 innings of scoreless ball in a 2–1 victory over the Kansas City Royals at Kauffman Stadium on September 20. In 9 games (8 starts) for San Francisco, Black struggled to a 1–5 record and 6.44 ERA with 31 strikeouts across 36 1/3 innings pitched.

Black was optioned to the Triple-A Sacramento River Cats to begin the 2025 season. He made one appearance for San Francisco during the regular season, allowing five runs with five strikeouts over four innings pitched. On November 6, 2025, Black was designated for assignment by the Giants.

=== Kansas City Royals ===
On November 11, 2025, Black was traded to the Kansas City Royals in exchange for Logan Martin. Black was optioned to the Triple-A Omaha Storm Chasers to begin the 2026 season. He made 17 appearances for Kansas City, recording a 4.31 ERA with 19 strikeouts across 31 1/3 innings pitched. On October 23, 2026, Black was removed from the 40–man roster and sent outright to Triple–A Omaha.
