= Nick Avila =

American baseball player (born 1997)

- Pitcher
- Born: July 25, 1997 (age 29); Modesto, California, U.S.
- Batted: Right Threw: Right

MLB debut
- April 1, 2024, for the San Francisco Giants

Last MLB appearance
- May 24, 2024, for the San Francisco Giants

Career statistics
- Win–loss record: 1–0
- Earned run average: 8.49
- Strikeouts: 14
- Stats at Baseball Reference

Teams
- San Francisco Giants (2024)

Nicholas Paul Avila (born July 25, 1997) is an American former professional baseball pitcher. He played in Major League Baseball (MLB) for the San Francisco Giants.

== Career ==
=== Amateur career ===
Avila attended Turlock High School in Turlock, California, and played for the school's baseball team from 2013 to 2015. He enrolled at California State University, Long Beach and played college baseball for the Long Beach State Dirtbags.

In 2017, Avila played collegiate summer baseball for the Wisconsin Rapids Rafters of the Northwoods League.

=== San Francisco Giants ===
The San Francisco Giants selected Avila in the 26th round of the 2019 MLB draft, and he signed for a signing bonus of $50,000.

On December 7, 2022, the Chicago White Sox selected Avila from the Giants in the Rule 5 draft. Avila posted a 7.20 ERA in seven appearances for the White Sox in spring training, and was informed he would not make the Opening Day roster on March 26, 2023. He was returned to the Giants on March 28. In 2023 with Sacramento he led the PCL in wins with 14 and in games (56), was 14–0 with a 3.00 ERA in 72 innings, and had three saves.

Avila began the 2024 season back with Triple–A Sacramento. On April 1, 2024, Avila was selected to the 40-man roster and promoted to the major leagues for the first time. In 8 games for the Giants, he struggled to an 8.49 ERA with 14 strikeouts across 11 2/3 innings pitched. On June 16, Avila was released by the Giants following the promotion of Spencer Bivens.

=== Baltimore Orioles ===
On June 17, 2024, Avila was claimed off release waivers by the Baltimore Orioles. He was subsequently optioned to the Triple–A Norfolk Tides and placed on the injured list with a shoulder impingement. After 9 rehab outings split between the High–A Aberdeen IronBirds and Triple–A Norfolk, Avila was designated for assignment on August 21. He was released by the Orioles organization on August 26.

== See also ==
- Rule 5 draft results
