= Erik Miller (baseball) =

American baseball player (born 1998)

Boston Red Sox – No. 67
- Pitcher
- Born: February 13, 1998 (age 28); St. Louis, Missouri, U.S.
- Bats: Left Throws: Left

MLB debut
- March 28, 2024, for the San Francisco Giants

MLB statistics (through 2026 season)
- Win–loss record: 12–8
- Earned run average: 3.09
- Strikeouts: 183
- Stats at Baseball Reference

Teams
- San Francisco Giants (2024–2026); Boston Red Sox (2026–present)

Erik Christopher Miller (born February 13, 1998) is an American professional baseball pitcher for the Boston Red Sox of Major League Baseball (MLB). He has previously played in MLB for the San Francisco Giants.

Miller played college baseball for the Stanford Cardinal and was selected by the Philadelphia Phillies in the fourth round of the 2019 MLB draft. He was traded to the Giants prior to the 2023 season, and made his MLB debut with them in 2024. At the 2026 trade deadline, the Giants traded Miller to the Red Sox.

== Early life ==
Miller attended De Smet Jesuit High School in Creve Coeur, Missouri, where he played baseball. In 2015, his junior year, he went 5–1 with a 3.58 ERA, and as a senior in 2016, he compiled a 3–4 record and 3.14 ERA. He went undrafted in the 2016 Major League Baseball draft after emailing professional scouts that had contacted him and informing them that he would not sign if selected, and would be honoring his commitment to play college baseball at Stanford University.

== College career ==
In 2017, as a freshman for the Stanford Cardinal, Miller appeared in 17 games (making 13 starts and four relief appearances) in which he went 5–2 with a 3.65 ERA. After the season, he participated in the New England Collegiate Baseball League with the Newport Gulls. As a sophomore in 2018, he started 13 games, going 4–4 with a 4.07 ERA, striking out 52 over 48 2/3 innings. That summer, he played in the Cape Cod Baseball League with the Orleans Firebirds. During his junior season in 2019, Miller started 15 games and pitched to a 3.15 ERA and 97 strikeouts over 80 innings.

== Professional career ==
=== Draft and minor leagues ===
The Philadelphia Phillies selected Miller in the fourth round of the 2019 Major League Baseball draft. He signed with the Phillies for $428,300, and made his professional debut in 2019 with the Rookie-level Gulf Coast League Phillies before earning promotions to the Williamsport Crosscutters of the Low–A New York–Penn League and the Lakewood BlueClaws of the Single–A South Atlantic League during the season. Over 11 games (seven starts) between the three clubs, he went 1–0 with a 1.50 ERA and 52 strikeouts (13.0 strikeouts per 9 innings) over 36 innings. Miller did not play in a game in 2020 due to the cancellation of the minor league season because of the COVID-19 pandemic.

The Phillies invited Miller to spring training as a non-roster player in 2021. He began the 2021 season on the injured list, and pitched only 12 2/3 innings for the year. He was selected to play in the Arizona Fall League for the Peoria Javelinas after the season. He was assigned to the Reading Fightin Phils of the Double-A Eastern League to begin the 2022 season. He was selected to represent the Phillies at the 2022 All-Star Futures Game. In mid-August, he was promoted to the Lehigh Valley IronPigs of the Triple-A International League. Over 32 games (seven starts) between the two teams, he went 1–1 with a 3.54 ERA, 62 strikeouts (11.5 strikeouts per 9 innings), and 31 walks over 48 1/3 innings. He threw a fastball that could reach 98 mph, low-80s slider, and changeup.

On January 9, 2023, the Phillies traded Miller to the San Francisco Giants in exchange for Yunior Marte. In 54 appearances split between the Double–A Richmond Flying Squirrels and Triple–A Sacramento River Cats, he accumulated a 2.45 ERA with 88 strikeouts and 15 saves across 62 1/3 innings pitched. On November 14, the Giants added Miller to their 40-man roster to protect him from the Rule 5 draft.

Miller was initially optioned to Triple–A Sacramento to begin the 2024 season.

=== San Francisco Giants (2024–2026) ===
Following multiple injuries, Miller was recalled to the Giants' Opening Day roster, and he made his MLB debut on March 28, 2024. Miller made 73 appearances for San Francisco during his rookie campaign, compiling a 4–5 record and 3.88 ERA with 87 strikeouts across 67 1/3 innings pitched.

Miller made 36 appearances for the Giants to begin the 2025 season, logging a 4–1 record and 1.50 ERA with 22 strikeouts over 33 innings of work. On July 5, 2025, Miller was placed on the injured list due to a left elbow sprain, which was later specified as a mild UCL sprain. He was transferred to the 60-day injured list on August 21.

On April 16, 2026, Miller recorded his first career save after tossing a scoreless ninth inning against the Cincinnati Reds. He made 38 relief appearances for the Giants and had a 2–0 record, a 2.76 ERA, and 45 strikeouts over 32 2/3 innings.

=== Boston Red Sox (2026–present) ===
On August 3, 2026, the Giants traded Miller and Carlos Gutierrez to the Boston Red Sox in exchange for Marcelo Mayer. He pitched in 19 games for the Red Sox in the regular season and went 2–2 with a 3.38 ERA and 29 strikeouts over 18 2/3 innings. He made his postseason debut in the 2026 American League Wild Card Series and pitched in both games of the series, giving up one earned run and four hits across 0 2/3 innings.
