= James Martin Munley =

American judge (1936–2020)

Senior Judge of the United States District Court for the Middle District of Pennsylvania
- In office January 30, 2009 – March 22, 2020

Judge of the United States District Court for the Middle District of Pennsylvania
- In office October 22, 1998 – January 30, 2009
- Appointed by: Bill Clinton
- Preceded by: William W. Caldwell
- Succeeded by: Robert D. Mariani

Personal details
- Born: June 28, 1936 Scranton, Pennsylvania, U.S.
- Died: March 22, 2020 (aged 83) Danville, Pennsylvania, U.S.
- Spouse: Kathleen Munley
- Children: 2
- Parents: Robert W. Munley (father); Marion L. Munley (mother)
- Relatives: William J. Munley (grandfather)
- Education: University of Scranton (B.S.); Temple University School of Law (LL.B.)

James Martin Munley (June 28, 1936 – March 22, 2020) was a United States district judge of the United States District Court for the Middle District of Pennsylvania.

== Education and career ==
Born in Scranton, Pennsylvania, Munley received a Bachelor of Science degree from the University of Scranton in 1958. He was in the United States Army from 1958 to 1960. He served with the 30th Infantry Regiment, 3rd Infantry Division in Schweinfurt, Germany and became a private first class. He received a Bachelor of Laws from Temple University School of Law in 1963.

He was a law clerk to Justice Michael J. Eagen of the Supreme Court of Pennsylvania from 1963 to 1964. He was in private practice, working at Munley Law with his brother, Robert W. Munley, in Scranton from 1964 to 1977. He was an Arbitrator for U.S. Steel and the Steel Workers of America from 1970 to 1977. He was an Arbitrator on the United States Postal Service Expedited Arbitration Panel from 1972 to 1977. He was an Arbitrator on the Middle Atlantic Expedited Arbitration Panel from 1972 to 1977. He was a hearing examiner for the Pennsylvania Department of Revenue from 1973 to 1977. He was a judge on the Pennsylvania Court of Common Pleas, Forty-fifth Judicial District from 1978 to 1998.

== Federal judicial service ==
Munley was nominated by President Bill Clinton on June 4, 1998, to a seat on the United States District Court for the Middle District of Pennsylvania vacated by William W. Caldwell. He was confirmed by the United States Senate on October 21, 1998, and received his commission on October 22, 1998. He assumed senior status on January 30, 2009. Munley died on March 22, 2020, aged 83.

In 2007, Munley ruled that an ordinance punishing anyone who rents to or hires undocumented immigrants is unconstitutional. The name of the case was Lozano v. Hazleton.

== Family ==
Munley's parents Robert W. Munley and Marion L. Munley served in the Pennsylvania General Assembly. His grandfather William J. Munley also served in the Pennsylvania General Assembly. He is the father of Julia K. Munley.

== Sources ==
Legal offices
Preceded by William W. Caldwell	Judge of the United States District Court for the Middle District of Pennsylvania; 1998–2009	Succeeded by Robert D. Mariani
