= Marion L. Munley =

American politician

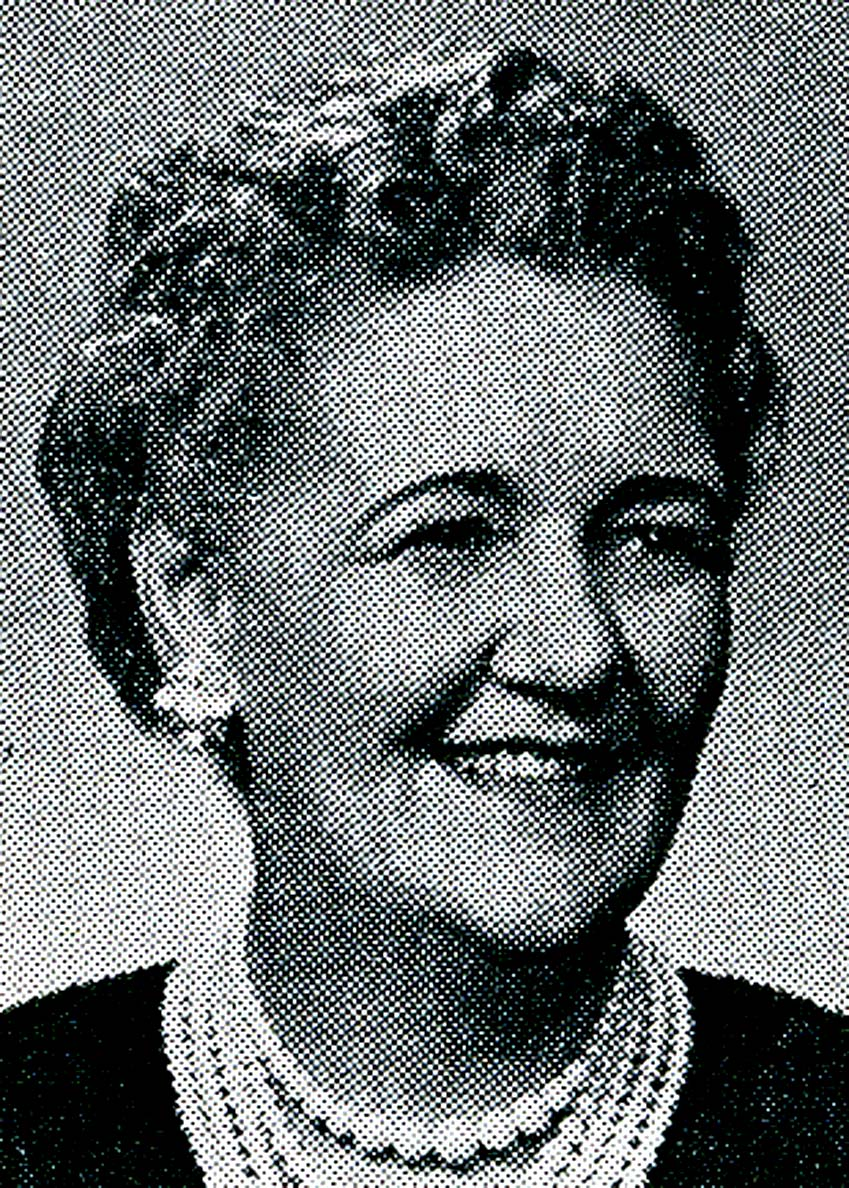
- Born: 19 August 1905; Buffalo
- Died: September 14, 1983 (aged 78); Archbald, Pennsylvania, U.S.
- Occupation: Politician

Marion Langan Munley (August 19, 1905 – September 14, 1983) was among the first women elected to the Pennsylvania House of Representatives. She established multiple precedents for women in Pennsylvania public life and was a prominent leader in her community.

== Life ==
Marion L. Munley was born in Buffalo, New York, on August 19, 1905, to Martin and Julia Walsh Langan. A graduate of St. John's High School, Munley attended Marywood College (now Marywood University) and the Powell School of Business in Scranton, Pennsylvania.

In the 1920s, she served as secretary for U.S. Rep. Patrick J. Boland and the "Hoban for Judge" campaigns. She became an active member of the Democratic Party, spearheading many Democratic functions in Lackawanna County.

She married Democratic Pennsylvania Rep. Robert W. Munley, whose father, William J. Munley, also served in the Pennsylvania General Assembly. The couple had two sons, Robert W. Munley Jr., the founder of Munley Law Personal Injury Attorneys, and the Honorable James M. Munley, a federal district court judge.

== Political career ==
Following her husband's death on January 25, 1947, Munley became the first woman to represent Lackawanna County in the state house after winning a special election on September 9, 1947. She was reelected eight times after.

April 5, 1949, Munley addressed the House to raise awareness about a dangerous mine fire in her district and its effect on her Carbondale constituents. Noting that the Department of Mines had failed to take action to protect residents, she urged the House to push the Department to address the issue immediately and requested support for a resolution. The resolutions were submitted to the Clerk.

On September 17, 1951, the Pennsylvania House of Representatives passed a lighthearted resolution celebrating Munley’s recent birthday on August 19. The resolution highlighted her past as "Miss Anthracite" and her well-known opposition to the "Big Truck Bill," which earned her the playful nickname "Choo Choo" from her colleagues. Munley graciously thanked her fellow representatives for the surprise and joked about keeping her age a mystery.

The House appointed her as a Teller to help count and verify the votes for Governor, Lieutenant Governor, and Secretary of Internal Affairs in a joint session with the Senate on January 4, 1955.

In March 1957, Munley defended the State Highway Department in the Pennsylvania House, calling out a Pittsburgh newspaper for false claims. She pointed out that road-building contracts in the Pittsburgh area had more than doubled under Secretary Joseph Lawler and that no engineers had been fired, regardless of political affiliation.

Munley was invited to preside over the Pennsylvania House of Representatives during the first reading of seventeen House Bills on May 15, 1957. After successfully overseeing the session, she was praised by the Speaker for her capable leadership, noting that she made a "smash hit" as the presiding officer.

March 17, 1959, Munley was asked to temporarily preside over the Pennsylvania House of Representatives session as the only Irish woman present. She oversaw the first reading of several House and Senate bills, earning praise for her leadership.

On August 19, 1959, the Pennsylvania House took a moment to celebrate Munley’s birthday. She was given a beautiful orchid, and the members sang "Happy Birthday." Touched by the gesture, she expressed her gratitude, noting her Irish sentimentality.

Munley was the co-author of House Bill 66 (1959), also known as the Equal Pay for Women Act, which prohibited “the discrimination in rate of pay of sex conferring powers and imposing duties on the Department of Labor and Industry.” Pennsylvania Governor David L. Lawrence signed the act into law on December 17, 1959.

Munley served on the Commission on Interstate Cooperation from 1961-1962. She was instrumental in the development of industry in Lackawanna County and in the process of developing the Archbald Glacial Pothole area into a state park. She was also a determined proponent of labor legislation and equal pay for women in Pennsylvania.

Munley introduced a resolution on February 28, 1962, urging General Electric to reconsider closing its Scranton plant, which would impact 340 workers and the local economy. The resolution highlighted that the plant was profitable and had strong labor relations. Lawmakers from both sides backed the resolution, saying Pennsylvania had great workers and was becoming more business-friendly. She thanked them for recognizing the hardworking people in her district and stressed how badly they needed jobs. The resolution passed unanimously and was sent to the Senate.

In 1963-1964, she was elected as the Minority Caucus Secretary, the first woman to be elected to a leadership position in the Democratic caucus.

On June 16, 1964, Pennsylvania House of Representatives members paid tribute to Munley, who was preparing to leave office at the end of her term. Lawmakers shared how much they'd miss her, calling her a motherly figure who helped keep things calm during challenging debates. The Speaker also praised Munley for her honesty, humor, and great ability. Munley thanked her colleagues, joking about her Irish roots and sharing how much she would miss the friends she had made during her time in office. She invited anyone visiting Lackawanna County to stop by her home.

From 1965-1966, she became Secretary of the Pennsylvania House of Representatives, the first and only woman to hold that position.

=== Other political activities ===
Munley was a member of the Young Democrats of Lackawanna County, the Blakely Democratic Club, the Jermyn Democratic Club, and the Women's Democratic Club of Mayfield. She founded the 20th Ward Women’s Democratic Association. Munley was instrumental in the development of industry in Lackawanna County, and in the process of developing the Archbald Glacial Pothole area into a state park. She was also a determined proponent of labor legislation and equal pay for women in Pennsylvania.

== Death ==
Munley died on September 15, 1983, in her home of 50 years in Archbald, Pennsylvania.

== Legacy ==
In 1987, Munley became the first woman to have her portrait hung in the Pennsylvania State Capitol. The oil portrait was a gift of her sons to Pennsylvania House of Representatives Speaker K. Leroy Irvis. It is the only portrait of a female Member of the state General Assembly owned by the House of Representatives. The portrait is currently hanging in the Member's Lounge.

The Honorable Marion L. Munley Endowed Scholarship, established at Marywood University by Munley's family in her honor, is presented to a student interested in law and/or public service.

Munley was included in the Distinguished Citizens Memorial in Scranton, PA, in October 2021, joining Robert Casey Sr., William Scranton, Joseph M. McDade, and Michael Eagen. Her monument is on display at the Lackawanna County Courthouse. She is the first and only woman who has received the honor.

On July 1, 2024, the Pennsylvania House of Representatives adopted a resolution recognizing Munley as the first woman to be elected state representative from northeastern Pennsylvania. House Resolution 339 designated Aug. 19, 2024, as "Marion Munley Day" in Pennsylvania.
