= Tyler Fitzgerald =

American baseball player (born 1997)

Los Angeles Dodgers
- Shortstop / Center fielder / Second baseman
- Born: September 15, 1997 (age 29); Springfield, Illinois, U.S.
- Bats: Right Throws: Right

MLB debut
- September 21, 2023, for the San Francisco Giants

MLB statistics (through 2025 season)
- Batting average: .252
- Home runs: 21
- Runs batted in: 53
- Stats at Baseball Reference

Teams
- San Francisco Giants (2023–2025)

Tyler Joseph Fitzgerald (born September 15, 1997) is an American professional baseball utility player in the Los Angeles Dodgers organization. He has previously played in Major League Baseball (MLB) for the San Francisco Giants. He played college baseball at the University of Louisville. He was selected by the San Francisco Giants in the fourth round of the 2019 MLB draft. He made his MLB debut in 2023.

== Early life ==
Fitzgerald was born in Springfield, Illinois, and attended Rochester High School in Rochester, Illinois. As a senior in 2016, he batted .500 with nine home runs, 31 RBIs, and 37 stolen bases. He was drafted by the Boston Red Sox in the 30th round of the 2016 Major League Baseball draft, but did not sign and instead enrolled at the University of Louisville to play college baseball.

Fitzgerald appeared in 48 games for Louisville as a freshman in 2017, slashing .208/.303/.272 over 125 at bats. As a sophomore, he batted .264/.344/.378 with 57 runs (8th in the conference), three home runs, 24 RBIs, 23 stolen bases (4th in the conference) in 24 attempts, 9 sacrifice hits (2nd), and 17 doubles (8th) over 246 at bats over 64 games. In 2017 and 2018, Fitzgerald played collegiate summer baseball with the Bourne Braves of the Cape Cod Baseball League. As a junior in 2019, he hit .315/.391/.483 with 64 runs (5th in the conference), three triples (6th), eight home runs, 65 RBIs (7th), 18 stolen bases (6th), and seven sacrifice flies (second) in 267 at bats over 66 games.

== Professional career ==
=== San Francisco Giants ===
Fitzgerald was selected by the San Francisco Giants in the fourth round of the 2019 Major League Baseball draft. He signed for $497,500. In 2019, Fitzgerald spent his first professional season with the Arizona League Giants, Salem-Keizer Volcanoes, and Augusta GreenJackets, batting .276/.359/.395 with one home run, six stolen bases in seven attempts, and 30 RBI over 48 games. He did not play in 2020, during the pandemic.

He played the 2021 season with the Eugene Emeralds, tied for the league lead with 28 doubles and 139 strikeouts and slashing .262/.342/.495 with 71 runs (2nd in the league), 19 home runs (2nd), and 65 RBI (3rd) in 382 at-bats over 103 games, playing shortstop exclusively. He was a 2021 NWL post-season All Star, and an MiLB Organization All Star.

He was assigned to the Richmond Flying Squirrels for the 2022 season. Over 125 games, Fitzgerald slashed .229/.310/.424 with 74 runs (2nd in the league), 21 home runs, 58 RBI, 19 hit by pitch (3rd), 171 strikeouts (2nd), and 20 stolen bases in 21 attempts. He played 87 games at shortstop, 30 at second base, eight at third base, and two as a designated hitter.

He returned to Richmond to open the 2023 season. After 19 games for Richmond in which he batted .324/.410/.588 in 68 at-bats, Fitzgerald was promoted to the Triple–A Sacramento River Cats, where he played in 102 games and hit .287/.358/.499 with 72 runs, 20 home runs, 69 RBI, and 29 stolen bases (7th in the PCL) in 415 at-bats. On September 21, 2023, Fitzgerald was selected to the 40-man roster and promoted to the major leagues for the first time. He made 10 appearances for San Francisco during his rookie campaign, going 7-for-32 (.219) with two home runs, five RBI, and two stolen bases.

Fitzgerald began the 2024 season with the Triple-A Sacramento River Cats before being recalled by the Giants in April. He spent the remainder of the season as a versatile utility player, appearing in 96 games. In July, Fitzgerald put together a historic rookie hot streak, becoming the first Giants rookie since the franchise moved to San Francisco to hit a home run in five consecutive games from July 20–24. He finished his breakout rookie campaign with a .280 batting average, 15 home runs, 34 RBIs, and 17 stolen bases.

Fitzgerald made the Giants' 2025 Opening Day roster but struggled to match his rookie production. On May 1, 2025, he was placed on the 10-day injured list after suffering a left rib fracture while making a diving catch. After returning from the injury, his offensive production dipped, and he spent the remainder of the season alternating between San Francisco and the Triple-A Sacramento River Cats. He finished the 2025 season appearing in 72 major league games, posting a .217 batting average with 4 home runs and 14 RBIs.

Fitzgerald was optioned to Triple-A Sacramento to begin the 2026 season. On March 30, 2026, Fitzgerald was designated for assignment by San Francisco following the acquisition of Dylan Smith.

=== Toronto Blue Jays ===
On April 4, 2026, Fitzgerald was traded to the Toronto Blue Jays in exchange for cash considerations. He was recalled to the majors on April 7. Fitzgerald did not appear in a game for Toronto prior to being optioned to the Triple-A Buffalo Bisons on April 14; he was designated for assignment by the team on April 24. In six appearances for the Bisons, he had gone 3-for-20 (.150) with one stolen base.

=== Los Angeles Dodgers ===
On April 28, 2026, the Los Angeles Dodgers acquired Fitzgerald from the Blue Jays in exchange for cash considerations. He made 24 appearances for the Triple-A Oklahoma City Comets, hitting .293 with six home runs, 22 RBI, and three stolen bases prior to landing on the minor league injured list. Fitzgerald was released by the Dodgers organization on June 10 and then re-signed to a minor league contract on June 14, though he remained on the injured list for the rest of the season.

On November 3, 2026, Fitzgerald re-signed with the Dodgers on a new minor league contract for the 2027 season.

== Personal life ==
Fitzgerald's father, Mike, was drafted in the first round in the 1984 MLB draft by the St. Louis Cardinals and played 13 games in the majors as a first baseman; in the minors, in 1987 he led the Texas League with 108 RBIs, and was fourth in the league in home runs with 27.
