= Scranton Saint Patrick's Day Parade =

Saint Patrick's Day parade

Coordinates: 41.411065°N 75.662529°W

The St. Patrick's Parade Day in Scranton or Parade Day is one of the largest Saint Patrick's Day parades in the United States. It is held in Scranton, Pennsylvania every year on the Saturday of the weekend before St. Patrick's Day - even if St Patrick's day falls on a Saturday or Sunday. For example, in 2013, St. Patrick's Day was on a Sunday, and the Parade was held on the Saturday of the previous weekend - March 9.

The date of the parade is commonly referred to as "Parade Day". Festivities begin with a mass at 10:00 am at St Peter's Cathedral. The mass is followed by a 2-mile footrace of the parade route at 11:00, an hour later the parade begins.

Each year, thousands of people line the streets of downtown Scranton on Parade Day to take part in one of the city's greatest traditions. The city has hosted a St. Patrick's Day Parade since early in its history, with the current iteration being held annually since 1862. The Parade is sponsored and organized by the St. Patrick's Day Parade Association of Lackawanna County. Attendance for the 2008 parade, which featured appearances by Bertie Ahern, Hillary Clinton, and Andy Buckley of The Office, was estimated to be as high as 150,000 people.

The parade usually involves about 12,000 participants, including bagpipers, Irish stepdancers, high school bands, local organizations and other Irish groups.

The 2020 parade was cancelled due to the COVID-19 pandemic. And 2021 was rescheduled to mid-September. Other cancellations were in 1917–18 & 1942–45.
