= Spencer Bivens =

American baseball player (born 1994)

Kansas City Royals – No. 76
- Pitcher
- Born: June 28, 1994 (age 32); Virginia Beach, Virginia, U.S.
- Bats: Right Throws: Right

MLB debut
- June 16, 2024, for the San Francisco Giants

MLB statistics (through 2026 season)
- Win–loss record: 7–4
- Earned run average: 4.00
- Strikeouts: 110
- Stats at Baseball Reference

Teams
- San Francisco Giants (2024–2026); Kansas City Royals (2026–present)

Spencer Bivens (born June 28, 1994) is an American professional baseball pitcher for the Kansas City Royals of Major League Baseball (MLB). He has previously played in MLB for the San Francisco Giants.

== Amateur career ==
Bivens played high school baseball at State College Area High School in his hometown of State College, Pennsylvania. After graduating, Bivens enrolled in Louisburg College, pitching to a 3.14 ERA as a sophomore in 2014. He transferred to Pennsylvania State University in 2015, his dream school from growing up. Before he could pitch for their baseball team, he failed a drug test, causing him to lose his spot on the team. Two years later he transferred to Rogers State University. Bivens would pitch the next two seasons for the team, recording a 3.21 ERA in 27 appearances. Following the conclusion of his senior season, he played for a time with the Lemont Ducks of the Centre County Baseball League, an amateur league near State College.

== Professional career ==
=== Lions de Savigny-sur-Orge ===
Bivens was not selected in the 2018 Major League Baseball draft, and signed with the Lions de Savigny-sur-Orge of the Division Élite, a French independent league. In 75 innings pitched, he recorded a 2.51 ERA. His performance in the French League earned him the nickname “Mr. Belvedere”, both a nod to the vodka brand as well as the 1980s sitcom starring Bob Uecker.

=== Steel City Slammin' Sammies ===
On February 18, 2020, Bivens signed with the Kotlářka Praha of the Czech Baseball Extraliga. However, he was unable to play for the team after their season was cancelled due to the COVID-19 pandemic.

Bivens later signed with the Steel City Slammin' Sammies of the newly–formed Washington League. In 6 games (3 starts), he posted a 3–2 record and 3.74 ERA with 19 strikeouts across 21 2/3 innings pitched.

=== Washington Wild Things ===
On October 13, 2020, Bivens signed with the Washington Wild Things of the Frontier League. In nine appearances for Washington, he struggled to a 7.24 ERA with 10 strikeouts across 13 2/3 innings pitched. On July 7, 2021, Bivens was released by the Wild Things.

=== West Virginia Power ===
On July 8, 2021, Bivens signed with the West Virginia Power of the Atlantic League of Professional Baseball. In three contests, he posted a 10.50 ERA with seven strikeouts across six innings of work.

=== Gastonia Honey Hunters ===
On July 19, 2021, Bivens was traded to the Gastonia Honey Hunters of the Atlantic League of Professional Baseball in exchange for Alexis Candelario. In 14 starts for Gastonia, he compiled a 4–8 record and 7.26 ERA with 62 strikeouts across 74 1/3 innings pitched. In 2022, Bivens made three scoreless appearances for the Honey Hunters, striking out nine across 6 2/3 innings.

=== San Francisco Giants ===
On May 25, 2022, Bivens signed a minor league contract with the San Francisco Giants organization. He split the remainder of the season between the Single–A San Jose Giants and Triple–A Sacramento River Cats. In 27 appearances for the two affiliates, Bivens accumulated a 3.95 ERA with 48 strikeouts across 43 1/3 innings.

Bivens began the 2023 season with the High–A Eugene Emeralds, and was promoted to the Double–A Richmond Flying Squirrels after six games. In 27 appearances for Richmond, he registered a 5–4 record and 3.69 ERA with 72 strikeouts across 78 innings pitched.

Bivens was invited to major league spring training in 2024. He began the year with Triple–A Sacramento, recording a 2.81 ERA with 36 strikeouts and 8 saves across 21 games. Bivens was named the Pacific Coast League pitcher of the month for the month of May.

On June 16, 2024, Bivens was selected to the 40-man roster and promoted to the major leagues for the first time. In his debut later that day, he earned his first career win, going 3 innings, striking out 4 and allowing one hit, a home run by Nolan Schanuel. Bivens completed the 2024 season with a 3–1 record, 1 save, a 3.14 ERA, and 37 strikeouts across 48 2/3 innings, having appeared in 27 games.

Bivens made the Giants' Opening Day roster in 2025. Over 54 appearances for the team, he compiled a 4-3 record and 4.00 ERA in 81 innings, recording three saves and 61 strikeouts.

Bivens was optioned to Triple-A Sacramento to begin the 2026 season. He made four appearances for San Francisco, struggling to a 14.40 ERA with eight strikeouts across five innings of work. On September 9, 2026, Bivens was designated for assignment by the Giants.

=== Kansas City Royals ===
On September 12, 2026, Bivens was claimed off of waivers by the Kansas City Royals.
