= Archbald, Pennsylvania =

City in Pennsylvania, US

Archbald, Pennsylvania White Oak Run
- Borough
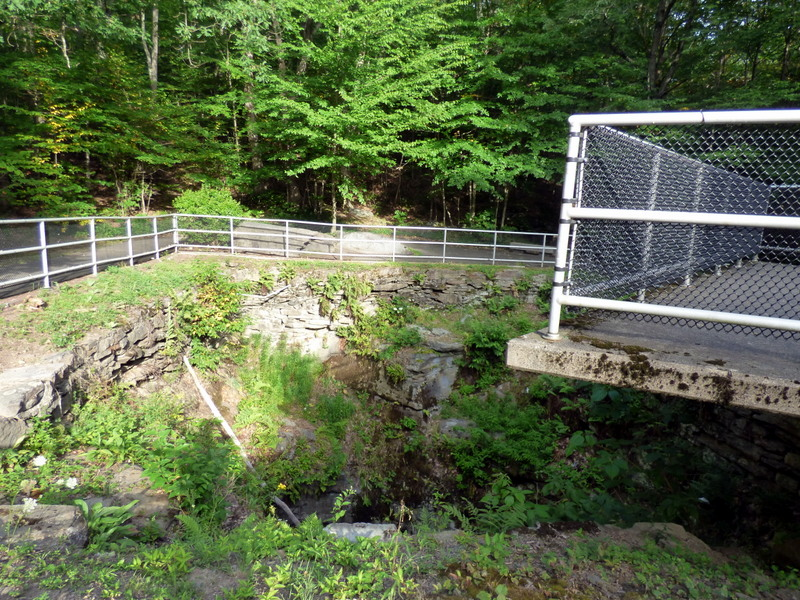
- Archbald Pothole State Park

- Location of Archbald in Lackawanna County, Pennsylvania

- Location of Archbald in Pennsylvania Archbald (the United States)
- Coordinates: 41.506383°N 75.550512°W
- Country: United States
- State: Pennsylvania
- County: Lackawanna

Area
  - Total: 17.10 sq mi (44.29 km^{2})
  - Land: 17.09 sq mi (44.26 km^{2})
  - Water: 0.015 sq mi (0.04 km^{2})
- Elevation: 1,079 ft (329 m)

Population (2020)
  - Total: 7,297
  - Density: 427.0/sq mi (164.87/km^{2})
- Time zone: UTC-5 (EST)
  - Summer (DST): UTC-4 (EDT)
- ZIP code: 18403
- Area code: 570
- FIPS code: 42-02832
- GNIS feature ID: 1215313
- Website: Borough website

Archbald is a borough in Lackawanna County, Pennsylvania, United States. It is part of Northeastern Pennsylvania and is named for James Archbald, the first mayor of Carbondale, Pennsylvania. Before being renamed in Archbald's honor, the name of the settlement was White Oak Run. Most of the original settlers were Irish Catholics, fleeing the Great Famine. The population was 7,348 at the 2021 census.

The village of Eynon is incorporated into Archbald.

== Geography ==
Archbald is located at 41.506383°N 75.550512°W. According to the United States Census Bureau, the borough has a total area of 17.10 sqmi (44.29 km^{2}), of which 17.09 smi (44.26 km^{2}) is land and 0.014 sqmi (0.036 km^{2}) (0.06%) is water.

== Demographics ==
Historical population
Census	Pop.	Note	%±
1870	2,571		—
1880	3,049		18.6%
1890	4,032		32.2%
1900	5,396		33.8%
1910	7,194		33.3%
1920	8,603		19.6%
1930	9,587		11.4%
1940	8,296		−13.5%
1950	6,304		−24.0%
1960	5,471		−13.2%
1970	6,118		11.8%
1980	6,295		2.9%
1990	6,291		−0.1%
2000	6,220		−1.1%
2010	6,984		12.3%
2020	7,297		4.5%
2021 (est.)	7,348	▲	0.7%

=== 2010 census ===
As of the 2010 United States census there were 7,011 people, 2,802 households, and 1,948 families in the borough. The population density was 408.7/sqmi (157.9/km^{2}). There were 2,952 housing units at an average density of 173/sqmi (67.5/km^{2}). The racial makeup of the borough was 96.9% White, 1.1% African American, 0.2% Native American, 0.7% Asian, 0.2% from other races, and 0.9% from two or more races. Hispanic or Latino of any race were 1.1% of the population.

There were 2,802 households, out of which 29% had children under the age of 18 living with them, 52.4% were married couples living together, 11.7% had a female householder with no husband present, 30.5% were non-families. 26% of all households were made up of individuals, and 12.5% had someone living alone who was 65 years of age or older. The average household size was 2.49 and the average family size was 3.0.

The borough population contained 22.9% under the age of 18, 60.3% from 18 to 64, and 16.8% who were 65 years of age or older. The median age was 42 years.

The median income for a household in the borough was $39,428, and the median income for a family was $52,410. Males had a median income of $36,913 versus $26,343 for females. The per capita income for the borough was $19,352. About 3.8% of families and 6.9% of the population were below the poverty line, including 3.7% of those under age 18 and 11.3% of those age 65 or over.

== Education ==
Archbald was the home of Archbald High School until the class of 1969 graduated. Given population declines, in the fall of 1969 the boroughs of Archbald, Blakely, and Jessup combined their public school systems to form the Valley View School District.

== Recreation ==
Archbald Pothole State Park is a 150-acre (0.61 km^{2}) park in northeastern Pennsylvania. The park is named for Archbald Pothole, a geologic feature that formed during the Wisconsin Glacial Period, around 15,000 years ago. The pothole is 38 feet (12 m) deep and has an elliptical shape. The diameter of the pothole decreases downward. The largest diameter is 42 feet (13 m) by 24 feet (7.3 m). At the bottom it is 17 feet (5.2 m) by 14 feet (4.3 m). The pothole has a volume of about 18,600 cubic feet (530 m^{3}), therefore it could hold approximately 140,000 gallons.

The Lackawanna River, designated as an American Heritage River in 1997, runs through Archbald Borough. The Pennsylvania Fish and Boat Commission classified sections of the river that runs through Archbald as Class A Wild Trout Waters, meaning the river supports and sustains an abundant amount of wild brown trout for anglers to catch.

== Notable people ==
- Anthony Esolen, academic, translator, and writer
- Max Kranick, (born July 21, 1997), MLB professional baseball pitcher for the Washington Nationals
- Joseph P. McDonald, (September 29, 1919 – August 7, 1994), U.S. Army Air Corps Private at Fort Shafter’s Intercept Center near Pearl Harbor; instrumental in the initial report of Imperial Japanese Navy Air Service's impending attack on Pearl Harbor
- James Martin Munley (1936-2020), judge, Court of Common Pleas, Lackawanna County (1978–98), US District Court Judge, Middle District of Pennsylvania (1998–2020).
- Marion L. Munley (1905-1983), Pennsylvania state representative 1947–64
- Joe Paparella (1909-1994), American League umpire; born in Eynon
- James P. Scoblick (1909-1981), congressman from Pennsylvania's 10th congressional district (1946–49)
- Bob Shemonski (1931-1986), University of Maryland football star (1949-1951)
- William Henry Stanton (1848-1900), congressman from Pennsylvania's 12th congressional district (1876–77)
- Dick Tracewski (1935-), Major League Baseball player and coach; born in Eynon
