= 2024 Chicago White Sox season =

2024 Chicago White Sox
- League: American League
- Division: Central
- Ballpark: Guaranteed Rate Field
- City: Chicago
- Record: 41–121 (.253)
- Divisional place: 5th
- Owners: Jerry Reinsdorf
- General managers: Chris Getz
- Managers: Pedro Grifol (fired August 8); Grady Sizemore (from August 8)
- Television: NBC Sports Chicago; NBC Sports Chicago+
- Radio: ESPN Chicago; Chicago White Sox Radio Network
- Stats: ESPN.com; Baseball Reference

The 2024 Chicago White Sox season was the club's 125th season in Chicago, their 124th in the American League and their 34th at Rate Field. It was their first full season under general manager Chris Getz.

In their worst season in team history and one of the worst seasons in modern MLB history, the team began the season with a 3–22 record, marking the poorest start in the franchise's history, which also tied the worst start in the wild card era with the 2022 Cincinnati Reds and the 2003 Detroit Tigers. This record was also the second worst in modern baseball history, behind only the 1988 Orioles' 0–21 and 2–23 start. On June 6, following a defeat to the Boston Red Sox, the White Sox established a franchise record for the most consecutive losses at 14. During this losing streak, the White Sox had their first winless homestand of at least seven games in franchise history, going 0–7.

On July 14, following a defeat to the Pittsburgh Pirates, the White Sox established a new MLB record for the highest number of losses before the All-Star break, totaling 71. The record was broken the following year by the Colorado Rockies, who lost 74 games.

The franchise record for consecutive losses was broken again on July 29 when the White Sox dropped their 15th straight game. The streak continued, and on August 5, the White Sox lost their 21st consecutive game. This marked the first time since the 1988 Baltimore Orioles that a team endured a 21-game losing streak. They managed to end the streak the following day with a victory over the Athletics. The White Sox became the first team since the 2021 Baltimore Orioles to go through two separate losing streaks of 14 games or more. Furthermore, they set a record for the fastest assurance of a losing season by losing 82 of their first 109 games, surpassing the 2003 Detroit Tigers, who lost 82 of their first 111 games.

On August 8, the White Sox dismissed manager Pedro Grifol after the team fell to 28–89, finishing his managing career at 89–190. On that same day, the team appointed Grady Sizemore as the interim manager.

On August 17, with their loss to the Houston Astros, the White Sox became the first team to be eliminated from playoff contention in 2024. This surpassed the 2018 Baltimore Orioles for the earliest clinch of missing the playoffs since the divisional era began in 1969. Eight days later, on August 25, the White Sox became the fastest team since the 1916 Philadelphia Athletics to lose 100 games in a season when they lost to their division rival Detroit Tigers, dropping them to 31–100.

The team set a new franchise record for losses when they lost their 107th game of the season on September 1 to the New York Mets. With this loss, the White Sox had their first 0–10 homestand in franchise history and became the first team since the 1965 Mets to have three losing streaks of at least ten games. The 0–10 homestand was part of a franchise record 16 straight home losses. It was also part of a 12-game losing streak.

On September 27, the White Sox lost their 121st game of the season to the Detroit Tigers, surpassing the 1962 New York Mets for the most losses in modern MLB history. However, the White Sox later finished the season at 41–121 (.253), three tenths of a percentage point better than the 1962 Mets. September proved to be their best month of the season as they went 10–15 and also had a record of 5–1 in their last 6 games, with their only loss coming from the aforementioned Tigers game.

== Offseason ==
=== Transactions ===
- November 17, 2023: White Sox trade LHP Aaron Bummer to the Atlanta Braves for RHP Michael Soroka, LHP Jared Shuster, INF Nicky Lopez, INF Braden Shewmake, and RHP Riley Gowens.
- November 29, 2023: White Sox sign infielder Paul DeJong to a 1-year contract.
- December 11, 2023: White Sox acquire catcher Max Stassi from the Atlanta Braves for cash or a player to be named later.
- December 14, 2023: White Sox sign RHP Erick Fedde to a 2-year contract.
- December 28, 2023: White Sox sign LHP Tim Hill to a 1-year contract.
- December 30, 2023: White Sox sign RHP Chris Flexen to a 1-year contract.
- January 5, 2024: White Sox sign catcher Martín Maldonado to a 1-year contract.
- January 26, 2024: White Sox sign RHP John Brebbia to a 1-year contract.
- February 3, 2024: White Sox acquire RHP Prelander Berroa, OF Zach DeLoach and the 69th pick in the 2024 MLB Draft from the Seattle Mariners for RHP Gregory Santos.
- February 3, 2024: White Sox acquire outfielder Dominic Fletcher from the Arizona Diamondbacks for RHP Cristian Mena.
- March 13, 2024: White Sox trade RHP Dylan Cease to the San Diego Padres for RHP Steven Wilson, RHP Drew Thorpe, RHP Jairo Iriarte, and OF Samuel Zavala.

== Regular season ==
=== Transactions ===
- July 29: White Sox make a three-team trade and trade pitcher Michael Kopech to the Los Angeles Dodgers and pitcher Erick Fedde and Outfielder Tommy Pham to the St. Louis Cardinals for third baseman Miguel Vargas, infielder Alexander Albertus, infielder Jeral Pérez, and a player to be named later from the Dodgers.
- July 30: White Sox trade outfielder Eloy Jiménez and cash considerations to the Baltimore Orioles for LHP Trey McGough. White Sox also trade LHP Tanner Banks to the Philadelphia Phillies for infielder William Bergolla. White Sox also trade infielder Paul DeJong to the Kansas City Royals for RHP Jarold Rosado.

=== Opening Day starters ===
Name	Pos.
Benintendi	LF
Moncada	3B
Robert	CF
Jimenez	DH
Vaughn	1B
DeJong	SS
Pillar	RF
Maldonado	C
Lopez	2B
Crochet	P

== Season standings ==
=== American League Central ===
AL Central
Team	W	L	Pct.	GB	Home	Road
Cleveland Guardians	92	69	.571	—	50‍–‍30	42‍–‍39
Kansas City Royals	86	76	.531	6½	45‍–‍36	41‍–‍40
Detroit Tigers	86	76	.531	6½	43‍–‍38	43‍–‍38
Minnesota Twins	82	80	.506	10½	43‍–‍38	39‍–‍42
Chicago White Sox	41	121	.253	51½	23‍–‍58	18‍–‍63

=== American League Wild Card ===
Division leaders
Team	W	L	Pct.
New York Yankees	94	68	.580
Cleveland Guardians	92	69	.571
Houston Astros	88	73	.547

Wild Card teams (Top 3 teams qualify for postseason)
Team	W	L	Pct.	GB
Baltimore Orioles	91	71	.562	+5
Kansas City Royals	86	76	.531	—
Detroit Tigers	86	76	.531	—
Seattle Mariners	85	77	.525	1
Minnesota Twins	82	80	.506	4
Boston Red Sox	81	81	.500	5
Tampa Bay Rays	80	82	.494	6
Texas Rangers	78	84	.481	8
Toronto Blue Jays	74	88	.457	12
Oakland Athletics	69	93	.426	17
Los Angeles Angels	63	99	.389	23
Chicago White Sox	41	121	.253	45

=== Record vs. opponents ===
==== Record vs. American League ====
2024 American League record Source: MLB Standings Grid – 2024
Team	BAL	BOS	CWS	CLE	DET	HOU	KC	LAA	MIN	NYY	OAK	SEA	TB	TEX	TOR	NL
Baltimore	—	8–5	6–1	3–4	2–4	2–5	4–2	4–2	6–0	8–5	3–3	4–2	9–4	5–2	7–6	20–26
Boston	5–8	—	4–3	2–5	3–4	2–4	4–2	4–2	3–3	6–7	5–1	4–3	6–7	4–2	8–5	21–25
Chicago	1–6	3–4	—	5–8	3–10	2–4	1–12	4–2	1–12	1–5	3–3	1–6	4–2	0–7	1–5	11–35
Cleveland	4–3	5–2	8–5	—	7–6	1–4	5–8	5–1	10–3	2–4	6–1	4–2	3–4	4–2	4–2	24–22
Detroit	4–2	4–3	10–3	6–7	—	2–4	6–7	3–4	6–7	2–4	3–3	5–1	5–1	3–4	5–2	22–24
Houston	5–2	4–2	4–2	4–1	4–2	—	4–3	9–4	2–4	1–6	8–5	5–8	4–2	7–6	5–2	22–24
Kansas City	2–4	2–4	12–1	8–5	7–6	3–4	—	5–2	6–7	2–5	4–2	3–3	3–3	1–5	5–2	23–23
Los Angeles	2–4	2–4	2–4	1–5	4–3	4–9	2–5	—	1–5	3–3	5–8	8–5	3–4	4–9	0–7	22–24
Minnesota	0–6	3–3	12–1	3–10	7–6	4–2	7–6	5–1	—	0–6	6–1	5–2	3–4	5–2	4–2	18–28
New York	5–8	7–6	5–1	4–2	4–2	6–1	5–2	3–3	6–0	—	5–2	4–3	7–6	3–3	7–6	23–23
Oakland	3–3	1–5	3–3	1–6	3–3	5–8	2–4	8–5	1–6	2–5	—	4–9	3–4	6–7	3–3	24–22
Seattle	2–4	3–4	6–1	2–4	1–5	8–5	3–3	5–8	2–5	3–4	9–4	—	3–3	10–3	2–4	26–20
Tampa Bay	4–9	7–6	2–4	4–3	1–5	2–4	3–3	4–3	4–3	6–7	4–3	3–3	—	1–5	9–4	26–20
Texas	2–5	2–4	7–0	2–4	4–3	6–7	5–1	9–4	2–5	3–3	7–6	3–10	5–1	—	2–4	19–27
Toronto	6–7	5–8	5–1	2–4	2–5	2–5	2–5	7–0	2–4	6–7	3–3	4–2	4–9	4–2	—	20–26

Updated with the results of all games through September 30, 2024.

==== Record vs. National League ====
2024 American League record vs. National League Source: MLB Standings
Team	AZ	ATL	CHC	CIN	COL	LAD	MIA	MIL	NYM	PHI	PIT	SD	SF	STL	WSH
Baltimore	2–1	2–1	0–3	3–0	2–1	1–2	1–2	1–2	1–2	2–1	1–2	1–2	1–2	0–3	2–2
Boston	0–3	1–3	2–1	2–1	1–2	0–3	3–0	1–2	0–3	2–1	3–0	1–2	2–1	1–2	2–1
Chicago	1–2	2–1	0–4	0–3	2–1	0–3	1–2	0–3	0–3	0–3	0–3	0–3	1–2	2–1	2–1
Cleveland	0–3	1–2	3–0	3–1	1–2	1–2	2–1	0–3	3–0	2–1	2–1	1–2	2–1	1–2	2–1
Detroit	2–1	0–3	1–2	3–0	2–1	2–1	1–2	1–2	2–1	1–2	2–2	1–2	1–2	2–1	1–2
Houston	2–1	0–3	0–3	0–3	4–0	2–1	3–0	2–1	2–1	1–2	1–2	1–2	1–2	2–1	1–2
Kansas City	1–2	1–2	1–2	3–0	1–2	1–2	2–1	2–1	1–2	1–2	2–1	1–2	0–3	3–1	3–0
Los Angeles	1–2	1–2	1–2	0–3	1–2	2–2	3–0	1–2	2–1	1–2	2–1	3–0	2–1	1–2	1–2
Minnesota	2–1	0–3	1–2	1–2	2–1	1–2	1–2	1–3	1–2	2–1	1–2	1–2	1–2	1–2	2–1
New York	2–1	1–2	2–1	0–3	2–1	1–2	2–1	2–1	0–4	3–0	1–2	2–1	3–0	1–2	1–2
Oakland	1–2	1–2	2–1	2–1	2–1	1–2	2–1	1–2	2–1	2–1	3–0	0–3	2–2	1–2	2–1
Seattle	2–1	2–1	1–2	3–0	2–1	0–3	1–2	1–2	3–0	2–1	1–2	3–1	2–1	2–1	1–2
Tampa Bay	3–0	1–2	2–1	2–1	2–1	1–2	3–1	1–2	3–0	0–3	2–1	1–2	2–1	1–2	2–1
Texas	2–2	1–2	2–1	2–1	0–3	2–1	2–1	0–3	1–2	0–3	2–1	1–2	1–2	1–2	2–1
Toronto	1–2	1–2	1–2	1–2	2–1	1–2	0–3	1–2	1–2	1–3	2–1	2–1	2–1	3–0	1–2

Updated with the results of all games through September 30, 2024.

=== Game log ===
Legend
	White Sox win
	White Sox loss
	Postponement
	Eliminated from playoff race
**Bold**	White Sox team member

2024 regular season game log: 41–121 (Home: 23–58; Away: 18–63)
March/April: 6–24 (Home: 5–11; Away: 1–13)

#	Date	Opponent	Time (CT)	Score	Win	Loss	Save	Attendance	Record	Streak
1	March 28	Tigers	3:10 pm	0–1	Skubal (1–0)	**Crochet** (0–1)	Foley (1)	33,420	0–1	L1
2	March 30	Tigers	1:10 pm	6–7 (10)	Miller (1–0)	**García** (0–1)	—	28,176	0–2	L2
3	March 31	Tigers	1:10 pm	2–3	Holton (1–0)	**Wilson** (0–1)	Foley (2)	17,478	0–3	L3
4	April 1	Braves	1:10 pm	0–9 (8)	Morton (1–0)	**Flexen** (0–1)	—	13,781	0–4	L4
5	April 2	Braves	6:40 pm	3–2	**Crochet** (1–1)	Minter (0–1)	**Kopech** (1)	12,300	1–4	W1
—	April 3	Braves	Postponed (rain); Makeup: June 27							
6	April 4	@ Royals	6:40 pm	1–10	Lugo (1–0)	**Soroka** (0–1)	—	10,863	1–5	L1
7	April 5	@ Royals	6:40 pm	1–2	Stratton (1–0)	**Kopech** (0–1)	McArthur (1)	10,592	1–6	L2
8	April 6	@ Royals	6:10 pm	0–3	Wacha (1–0)	**Flexen** (0–2)	Stratton (1)	15,453	1–7	L3
9	April 7	@ Royals	1:10 pm	3–5	Schreiber (1–0)	**García** (0–2)	McArthur (2)	14,251	1–8	L4
10	April 8	@ Guardians	4:10 pm	0–4	McKenzie (1–1)	**Banks** (0–1)	—	35,735	1–9	L5
11	April 9	@ Guardians	5:10 pm	7–5	**Wilson** (1–1)	Barlow (0–2)	**Kopech** (2)	14,887	2–9	W1
12	April 10	@ Guardians	5:10 pm	6–7 (10)	Morgan (1–0)	**Shaw** (0–1)	—	12,405	2–10	L1
13	April 12	Reds	6:40 pm	1–11	Abbott (1–1)	**Flexen** (0–3)	—	11,337	2–11	L2
14	April 13	Reds	1:10 pm	0–5	Lodolo (1–0)	**Crochet** (1–2)	—	22,598	2–12	L3
15	April 14	Reds	1:10 pm	4–11	Ashcraft (2–1)	**Soroka** (0–2)	—	17,589	2–13	L4
16	April 15	Royals	6:40 pm	0–2	Lugo (3–0)	**Nastrini** (0–1)	McArthur (3)	10,569	2–14	L5
—	April 16	Royals	Postponed (rain); Makeup: April 17							
17	April 17 (1)	Royals	1:10 pm	2–4	Anderson (1–1)	**Kopech** (0–2)	McArthur (4)	see 2nd game	2–15	L6
18	April 17 (2)	Royals	4:25 pm	2–1	**Fedde** (1–0)	Wacha (1–2)	**García** (1)	10,412	3–15	W1
19	April 19	@ Phillies	5:40 pm	0–7	Turnbull (2–0)	**Crochet** (1–3)	—	39,069	3–16	L1
20	April 20	@ Phillies	5:05 pm	5–9	Wheeler (1–3)	**Soroka** (0–3)	Alvarado (4)	44,546	3–17	L2
21	April 21	@ Phillies	12:35 pm	2–8	Nola (3–1)	**Nastrini** (0–2)	—	43,614	3–18	L3
22	April 22	@ Twins	6:40 pm	0–7	Paddack (1–1)	**Cannon** (0–1)	—	12,443	3–19	L4
23	April 23	@ Twins	6:40 pm	5–6	Jackson (1–1)	**Wilson** (1–2)	—	11,223	3–20	L5
24	April 24	@ Twins	6:40 pm	3–6	Ryan (1–1)	**Crochet** (1–4)	Jax (3)	12,546	3–21	L6
25	April 25	@ Twins	12:10 pm	3–6	Sands (1–0)	**Banks** (0–2)	Jax (4)	20,363	3–22	L7
26	April 26	Rays	6:40 pm	9–4	**Flexen** (1–3)	Eflin (1–3)	—	10,323	4–22	W1
27	April 27	Rays	6:10 pm	8–7 (10)	**García** (1–2)	Maton (0–2)	—	28,009	5–22	W2
28	April 28	Rays	1:10 pm	4–2	**Fedde** (2–0)	Littell (1–2)	**Leasure** (1)	12,669	6–22	W3
29	April 29	Twins	6:40 pm	2–3	Jax (2–2)	**Brebbia** (0–1)	Thielbar (2)	10,772	6–23	L1
30	April 30	Twins	6:40 pm	5–6	Thielbar (1–1)	**Kopech** (0–3)	Durán (1)	11,609	6–24	L2

May: 9–19 (Home: 5–10; Away: 4–9)

#	Date	Opponent	Time (CT)	Score	Win	Loss	Save	Attendance	Record	Streak
31	May 1	Twins	1:10 pm	5–10	Ober (3–1)	**Leone** (0–1)	—	12,216	6–25	L3
32	May 3	@ Cardinals	7:15 pm	0–3	Gray (4–1)	**Keller** (0–1)	Helsley (11)	34,010	6–26	L4
33	May 4	@ Cardinals	1:15 pm	6–5 (10)	**Kopech** (1–3)	Fernandez (0–1)	**Banks** (1)	38,559	7–26	W1
34	May 5	@ Cardinals	1:15 pm	5–1	**Crochet** (2–4)	Gallegos (2–1)	—	43,046	8–26	W2
35	May 6	@ Rays	5:50 pm	2–8	Ramírez (2–0)	**Clevinger** (0–1)	—	12,042	8–27	L1
36	May 7	@ Rays	5:50 pm	1–5	Eflin (2–4)	**Soroka** (0–4)	—	10,872	8–28	L2
37	May 8	@ Rays	5:50 pm	4–1	**Flexen** (2–3)	Civale (2–3)	**Kopech** (3)	12,877	9–28	W1
38	May 9	Guardians	6:40 pm	3–2	**Fedde** (3–0)	Lively (1–2)	**Kopech** (4)	10,495	10–28	W2
39	May 10	Guardians	6:40 pm	6–3	**Crochet** (3–4)	Carrasco (2–3)	**Leasure** (2)	17,319	11–28	W3
40	May 11	Guardians	6:10 pm	3–1	**Hill** (1–0)	McKenzie (2–3)	**Brebbia** (1)	26,152	12–28	W4
41	May 12	Guardians	1:10 pm	0–7	Allen (4–2)	**Soroka** (0–5)	—	15,529	12–29	L1
—	May 13	Nationals	Postponed (rain); Makeup: May 14							
42	May 14 (1)	Nationals	3:40 pm	3–6	Law (3–1)	**Brebbia** (0–2)	Finnegan (13)	see 2nd game	12–30	L2
43	May 14 (2)	Nationals	7:05 pm	4–0	**Fedde** (4–0)	Parker (2–2)	—	11,138	13–30	W1
44	May 15	Nationals	1:10 pm	2–0	**Crochet** (4–4)	Corbin (1–4)	**Kopech** (5)	11,008	14–30	W2
45	May 17	@ Yankees	6:05 pm	2–4	Cortés Jr. (2–4)	**Clevinger** (0–2)	Holmes (13)	46,025	14–31	L1
46	May 18	@ Yankees	12:05 pm	1–6	Gil (5–1)	**Keller** (0–2)	—	43,194	14–32	L2
47	May 19	@ Yankees	12:35 pm	2–7	Rodón (5–2)	**Flexen** (2–4)	—	41,041	14–33	L3
48	May 20	@ Blue Jays	2:07 pm	3–9	Berríos (5–3)	**Fedde** (4–1)	—	36,993	14–34	L4
49	May 21	@ Blue Jays	6:07 pm	5–0	**Crochet** (5–4)	Kikuchi (2–4)	—	28,176	15–34	W1
50	May 22	@ Blue Jays	6:07 pm	2–9	Bassitt (4–6)	**Nastrini** (0–3)	—	28,670	15–35	L1
51	May 23	Orioles	6:40 pm	6–8	Rodriguez (5–1)	**Clevinger** (0–3)	Kimbrel (10)	15,843	15–36	L2
52	May 24	Orioles	6:40 pm	4–6	Canó (3–2)	**Brebbia** (0–3)	Kimbrel (11)	18,831	15–37	L3
53	May 25	Orioles	1:10 pm	3–5	Tate (2–0)	**Kopech** (1–4)	Pérez (1)	22,283	15–38	L4
54	May 26	Orioles	1:10 pm	1–4	Bradish (1–0)	**Crochet** (5–5)	Kimbrel (12)	14,992	15–39	L5
55	May 27	Blue Jays	1:10 pm	1–5	Bassitt (5–6)	**Nastrini** (0–4)	—	14,993	15–40	L6
56	May 28	Blue Jays	6:40 pm	2–7	Gausman (4–3)	**Woodford** (0–1)	—	11,852	15–41	L7
57	May 29	Blue Jays	6:40 pm	1–3	Richards (1–0)	**Flexen** (2–5)	Romano (8)	11,599	15–42	L8
58	May 31	@ Brewers	7:10 pm	5–12	Paredes (1–0)	**Soroka** (0–6)	—	30,931	15–43	L9

June: 9–19 (Home: 6–8; Away: 3–11)

#	Date	Opponent	Time (CT)	Score	Win	Loss	Save	Attendance	Record	Streak
59	June 1	@ Brewers	3:10 pm	3–4 (10)	Milner (3–0)	**Kopech** (1–5)	—	36,017	15–44	L10
60	June 2	@ Brewers	1:10 pm	3–6	Peralta (4–3)	**Nastrini** (0–5)	Paredes (1)	30,442	15–45	L11
61	June 4	@ Cubs	7:05 pm	6–7	Little (2–1)	**Leasure** (0–1)	Neris (8)	38,397	15–46	L12
62	June 5	@ Cubs	7:05 pm	6–7	Neris (6–0)	**Kopech** (1–6)	—	40,073	15–47	L13
63	June 6	Red Sox	7:10 pm	2–14	Houck (6–5)	**Woodford** (0–2)	—	15,568	15–48	L14
64	June 7	Red Sox	7:10 pm	7–2	**Crochet** (6–5)	Criswell (3–3)	**Cannon** (1)	19,684	16–48	W1
65	June 8	Red Sox	3:10 pm	6–1	**Banks** (1–2)	Bello (6–3)	—	26,248	17–48	W2
66	June 9	Red Sox	1:10 pm	4–6 (10)	Jansen (2–1)	**Soroka** (0–7)	Booser (1)	21,055	17–49	L1
67	June 10	@ Mariners	8:40 pm	4–8	Stanek (4–1)	**Leasure** (0–2)	—	23,027	17–50	L2
68	June 11	@ Mariners	8:40 pm	3–4	Thornton (2–1)	**Brebbia** (0–4)	Stanek (5)	20,005	17–51	L3
69	June 12	@ Mariners	8:40 pm	1–2 (10)	Thornton (3–1)	**Wilson** (1–3)	—	23,312	17–52	L4
70	June 13	@ Mariners	8:40 pm	3–2 (10)	**Kopech** (2–6)	Muñoz (2–3)	**Banks** (2)	25,567	18–52	W1
71	June 14	@ Diamondbacks	8:40 pm	1–7	Nelson (4–5)	**Flexen** (2–6)	—	23,700	18–53	L1
72	June 15	@ Diamondbacks	9:10 pm	9–2	**Fedde** (5–1)	Vieira (0–1)	—	38,494	19–53	W1
73	June 16	@ Diamondbacks	3:10 pm	5–12	Montgomery (5–4)	**Thorpe** (0–1)	—	37,694	19–54	L1
74	June 18	Astros	7:10 pm	2–0	**Cannon** (1–1)	Valdez (5–5)	**Brebbia** (2)	16,763	20–54	W1
75	June 19	Astros	7:10 pm	1–4	Brown (4–5)	**Crochet** (6–6)	Hader (10)	14,124	20–55	L1
76	June 20	Astros	1:10 pm	3–5	Scott (3–2)	**Wilson** (1–4)	Hader (11)	14,435	20–56	L2
77	June 21	@ Tigers	5:40 pm	1–2	Flaherty (5–4)	**Fedde** (5–2)	Foley (13)	24,938	20–57	L3
78	June 22	@ Tigers	12:10 pm	5–1	**Thorpe** (1–1)	Maeda (2–4)	—	29,269	21–57	W1
79	June 23	@ Tigers	12:40 pm	2–11	Olson (2–8)	**Cannon** (1–2)	—	22,975	21–58	L1
80	June 24	Dodgers	7:10 pm	0–3	Hudson (4–1)	**Wilson** (1–5)	Vesia (4)	25,070	21–59	L2
81	June 25	Dodgers	7:10 pm	3–4	Petersen (2–0)	**Flexen** (2–7)	Phillips (13)	23,662	21–60	L3
82	June 26	Dodgers	7:10 pm	0–4	Stone (9–2)	**Fedde** (5–3)	—	36,225	21–61	L4
83	June 27	Braves	3:10 pm	1–0	**Shuster** (1–0)	Sale (10–3)	**Kopech** (6)	12,656	22–61	W1
84	June 28	Rockies	6:10 pm	5–3	**Thorpe** (2–1)	Hudson (2–11)	**Kopech** (7)	24,422	23–61	W2
85	June 29	Rockies	1:10 pm	11–3	**Banks** (2–2)	Quantrill (6–6)	—	21,490	24–61	W3
86	June 30	Rockies	1:10 pm	4–5 (14)	Beeks (5–4)	**Soroka** (0–8)	—	19,334	24–62	L1

July: 3–22 (Home: 1–11; Away: 2–11)

#	Date	Opponent	Time (CT)	Score	Win	Loss	Save	Attendance	Record	Streak
87	July 2	@ Guardians	5:40 pm	6–7	Clase (4–1)	**Kopech** (2–7)	—	25,654	24–63	L2
88	July 3	@ Guardians	5:40 pm	8–2	**Fedde** (6–3)	Williams (0–1)	—	37,151	25–63	W1
89	July 4	@ Guardians	12:10 pm	4–8	Lively (8–4)	**Shuster** (1–1)	—	29,404	25–64	L1
90	July 5	@ Marlins	6:10 pm	3–2	**Thorpe** (3–1)	Hoeing (0–1)	**Kopech** (8)	10,136	26–64	W1
91	July 6	@ Marlins	3:10 pm	3–4	Brazobán (1–1)	**Soroka** (0–9)	Scott (13)	13,409	26–65	L1
92	July 7	@ Marlins	12:40 pm	4–7	Chargois (1–0)	**Kopech** (2–8)	—	12,268	26–66	L2
93	July 8	Twins	7:10 pm	6–8 (11)	Durán (5–3)	**Shuster** (1–2)	Funderburk (1)	10,881	26–67	L3
—	July 9	Twins	Postponed (rain); Makeup: July 10							
94	July 10 (1)	Twins	1:10 pm	3–1	**Fedde** (7–3)	Ober (8–5)	**Kopech** (9)	see 2nd game	27–67	W1
95	July 10 (2)	Twins	4:06 pm	2–3	Okert (3–0)	**Soroka** (0–10)	Durán (14)	13,607	27–68	L1
96	July 12	Pirates	7:10 pm	1–4	Gonzales (1–0)	**Cannon** (1–3)	Bednar (17)	19,548	27–69	L2
97	July 13	Pirates	1:10 pm	2–6	Nicolas (1–2)	**Flexen** (2–8)	—	20,437	27–70	L3
98	July 14	Pirates	1:10 pm	4–9	Priester (2–5)	**Kuhl** (0–1)	—	16,501	27–71	L4
—	July 16	**94th All-Star Game in Arlington, TX**								
99	July 19	@ Royals	7:10 pm	1–7	Wacha (7–6)	**Flexen** (2–9)	—	26,693	27–72	L5
100	July 20	@ Royals	6:10 pm	1–6	Singer (6–6)	**Cannon** (1–4)	—	27,545	27–73	L6
101	July 21	@ Royals	1:10 pm	1–4	Lugo (12–4)	**Brebbia** (0–5)	—	22,226	27–74	L7
102	July 22	@ Rangers	7:05 pm	3–4 (10)	Hernández (3–0)	**Wilson** (1–6)	—	30,832	27–75	L8
103	July 23	@ Rangers	7:05 pm	2–3	Gray (5–4)	**Crochet** (6–7)	Yates (18)	39,240	27–76	L9
104	July 24	@ Rangers	7:05 pm	2–10	Eovaldi (7–4)	**Flexen** (2–10)	—	36,989	27–77	L10
105	July 25	@ Rangers	1:35 pm	1–2	Scherzer (2–3)	**Cannon** (1–5)	Robertson (2)	32,913	27–78	L11
106	July 26	Mariners	7:10 pm	0–10	Kirby (8–7)	**Thorpe** (3–2)	—	20,170	27–79	L12
107	July 27	Mariners	6:15 pm	3–6	Snider (1–1)	**Fedde** (7–4)	Muñoz (17)	21,037	27–80	L13
108	July 28	Mariners	1:10 pm	3–6	Miller (8–7)	**Crochet** (6–8)	Muñoz (18)	17,100	27–81	L14
109	July 29	Royals	7:10 pm	5–8	Stratton (3–3)	**Brebbia** (0–6)	McArthur (18)	12,179	27–82	L15
110	July 30	Royals	7:10 pm	3–4	Wacha (8–6)	**Ellard** (0–1)	Long (1)	15,360	27–83	L16
111	July 31	Royals	1:10 pm	3–10	Singer (8–6)	**Thorpe** (3–3)	—	14,112	27–84	L17

August: 4–22 (Home: 1–13; Away: 3–9)

#	Date	Opponent	Time (CT)	Score	Win	Loss	Save	Attendance	Record	Streak
112	August 2	@ Twins	7:10 pm	2–10	Ryan (7–7)	**Martin** (0–1)	—	30,801	27–85	L18
113	August 3	@ Twins	6:10 pm	2–6	Ober (11–5)	**Toussaint** (0–1)	—	38,289	27–86	L19
114	August 4	@ Twins	1:10 pm	7–13	Sands (5–1)	**Flexen** (2–11)	—	28,302	27–87	L20
115	August 5	@ Athletics	8:40 pm	1–5	Sears (9–8)	**Bush** (0–1)	—	4,971	27–88	L21
116	August 6	@ Athletics	8:40 pm	5–1	**Cannon** (2–5)	Stripling (2–11)	—	5,867	28–88	W1
117	August 7	@ Athletics	2:37 pm	2–3	McFarland (2–1)	**Toussaint** (0–2)	Miller (16)	6,964	28–89	L1
118	August 9	Cubs	7:10 pm	6–7	Taillon (8–6)	**Crochet** (6–9)	Neris (16)	38,127	28–90	L2
119	August 10	Cubs	6:15 pm	1–3	Hodge (1–1)	**Kuhl** (0–2)	Neris (17)	38,341	28–91	L3
120	August 12	Yankees	7:10 pm	12–2	**Toussaint** (1–2)	Gil (12–6)	—	22,815	29–91	W1
121	August 13	Yankees	7:10 pm	1–4	Cortés Jr. (6–10)	**Cannon** (2–6)	Cousins (1)	21,199	29–92	L1
122	August 14	Yankees	7:10 pm	2–10	Hill (4–0)	**Leone** (0–2)	Tonkin (2)	22,675	29–93	L2
123	August 16	@ Astros	7:10 pm	5–4	**Anderson** (1–0)	Arrighetti (5–11)	**Kuhl** (1)	37,307	30–93	W1
124	August 17	@ Astros	6:10pm	1–6	Brown (11–7)	**Flexen** (2–12)	—	37,008	30–94	L1
125	August 18	@ Astros	1:10 pm	0–2	Valdez (13–5)	**Bush** (0–2)	Hader (27)	37,169	30–95	L2
126	August 19	@ Giants	8:45 pm	3–5	Harrison (7–5)	**Cannon** (2–7)	Hicks (1)	29,209	30–96	L3
127	August 20	@ Giants	8:45 pm	1–4	Ray (3–2)	**Martin** (0–2)	Walker (2)	28,766	30–97	L4
128	August 21	@ Giants	2:45 pm	6–2	**Ellard** (1–1)	Miller (3–4)	—	28,375	31–97	W1
129	August 23	Tigers	7:10 pm	2–5	Vest (3–4)	**Ellard** (1–2)	Foley (17)	24,012	31–98	L1
130	August 24	Tigers	6:10 pm	4–13	Skubal (15–4)	**Bush** (0–3)	—	23,570	31–99	L2
131	August 25	Tigers	1:10 pm	4–9	Sammons (1–1)	**Cannon** (2–8)	—	16,928	31–100	L3
132	August 26	Tigers	7:10 pm	3–6	Guenther (1–0)	**Shuster** (1–3)	Holton (5)	10,975	31–101	L4
—	August 27	Rangers	Suspended (rain); Resuming: August 28							
133	August 28 (1)	Rangers	4:10 pm	1–3	Festa (2–1)	**Flexen** (2–13)	Yates (24)	see 2nd game	31–102	L5
134	August 28 (2)	Rangers	7:10 pm	3–4	Ureña (5–8)	**Anderson** (1–1)	Anderson (1)	11,285	31–103	L6
135	August 29	Rangers	1:10 pm	1–2	Eovaldi (10–7)	**Nastrini** (0–6)	Yates (25)	10,402	31–104	L7
136	August 30	Mets	7:10 pm	1–5	Megill (3–5)	**Cannon** (2–9)	—	15,288	31–105	L8
137	August 31	Mets	6:10 pm	3–5	Quintana (7–9)	**Martin** (0–3)	Buttó (3)	18,627	31–106	L9

September: 10–15 (Home: 5–5; Away: 5–10)

#	Date	Opponent	Time (CT)	Score	Win	Loss	Save	Attendance	Record	Streak
138	September 1	Mets	1:10 pm	0–2	Manaea (11–5)	**Crochet** (6–10)	Díaz (16)	16,887	31–107	L10
139	September 2	@ Orioles	2:05 pm	3–13	Burnes (13–7)	**Flexen** (2–14)	Irvin (1)	35,906	31–108	L11
140	September 3	@ Orioles	5:35 pm	0–9	Povich (2–7)	**Nastrini** (0–7)	—	15,108	31–109	L12
141	September 4	@ Orioles	5:35 pm	8–1	**Cannon** (3–9)	Suárez (7–5)	—	17,843	32–109	W1
142	September 6	@ Red Sox	6:10 pm	1–3	Kelly (6–2)	**Foster** (0–1)	Winckowski (1)	32,625	32–110	L1
143	September 7	@ Red Sox	6:15 pm	5–7	Criswell (6–4)	**Crochet** (6–11)	Jansen (26)	31,691	32–111	L2
144	September 8	@ Red Sox	12:35 pm	7–2	**Ellard** (2–2)	Kelly (6–3)	—	29,110	33–111	W1
145	September 9	Guardians	6:40 pm	3–5	Cantillo (1–3)	**Shuster** (1–4)	Clase (43)	11,429	33–112	L1
146	September 10	Guardians	6:40 pm	0–5	Ávila (6–1)	**Cannon** (3–10)	—	12,246	33–113	L2
147	September 11	Guardians	1:10 pm	4–6	Sandlin (8–0)	**Martin** (0–4)	Clase (44)	11,252	33–114	L3
148	September 13	Athletics	6:40 pm	0–2	Basso (1–0)	**Crochet** (6–12)	Miller (25)	26,513	33–115	L4
149	September 14	Athletics	6:10 pm	7–6	**Varland** (1–0)	Harris (4–4)	—	21,478	34–115	W1
150	September 15	Athletics	1:10 pm	4–3	**Burke** (1–0)	Sears (11–11)	**Ellard** (1)	18,017	35–115	W2
151	September 16	@ Angels	8:38 pm	8–4	**Cannon** (4–10)	Detmers (4–7)	—	35,587	36–115	W3
152	September 17	@ Angels	8:38 pm	0–5	Canning (6–13)	**Martin** (0–5)	—	36,254	36–116	L1
153	September 18	@ Angels	3:07 pm	3–4 (13)	Quijada (2–0)	**Iriarte** (0–1)	—	22,757	36–117	L2
154	September 20	@ Padres	8:40 pm	2–3 (10)	Morejón (3–2)	**Anderson** (1–2)	—	45,790	36–118	L3
155	September 21	@ Padres	7:40 pm	2–6	Pérez (5–5)	**Flexen** (2–15)	Scott (22)	45,360	36–119	L4
156	September 22	@ Padres	3:10 pm	2–4	Estrada (6–2)	**Ellard** (2–3)	Suárez (34)	45,197	36–120	L5
157	September 24	Angels	6:40 pm	3–2	**Berroa** (1–0)	Strickland (3–2)	**Anderson** (1)	17,606	37–120	W1
158	September 25	Angels	6:40 pm	4–3 (10)	**Shuster** (2–4)	Quijada (2–1)	—	18,423	38–120	W2
159	September 26	Angels	1:10 pm	7–0	**Flexen** (3–15)	Anderson (10–15)	—	15,678	39–120	W3
160	September 27	@ Tigers	5:40 pm	1–4	**Hurter** (6–1)	Shuster (2–5)	**Foley** (28)	44,435	39–121	L1
161	September 28	@ Tigers	12:10 pm	4–0	**Burke** (2–0)	Brieske (4–5)	—	41,933	40–121	W1
162	September 29	@ Tigers	2:10 pm	9–5	**Cannon** (5–10)	Maeda (3–7)	**De Los Santos** (2)	41,740	41–121	W2

== Loss number 121 ==
On September 22, the White Sox lost 4–2 to the San Diego Padres, earning their 120th loss. This surpassed the American League record set by the 2003 Detroit Tigers and tied the Major League record set by the 1962 expansion New York Mets. Following the game, several sports and news outlets ran articles discussing the potential for the White Sox to lose one of their remaining six games of the season to the Los Angeles Angels at home or the Tigers in Detroit to break the modern single-season loss record.

As a result, many White Sox fans bought tickets to home games against the Angels, hoping to witness the historic game where the team surpassed the modern loss record. Mixes of cheers and boos came from White Sox fans during the games when their team executed well, while fans yelled phrases such as "Sell the team!" when the team made mistakes. The White Sox won all three home games against the Angels to keep their record at 120 losses, resulting in fans throughout the stadium booing the White Sox. White Sox outfielder Andrew Benintendi acknowledged the fans' reaction after the game by saying: "People here tonight were trying to see history. They're going to have to wait one more day. Maybe."

During the games, White Sox fans held signs mentioning the historical significance of the potential loss, including one sign bearing "121" in the font of the White Sox logo. The White Sox swept the Angels, winning their final home game of the season with a 7–0 score, resulting in a standing ovation from most of the White Sox fans in the stadium.

=== Game recap ===
Prior to facing the Tigers, Interim manager Grady Sizemore stated that despite the frustration surrounding their exceptional win-loss record, the White Sox players were ultimately professionals who would not be shaken by it, and trusted that they would play to compete and to win. He further stated that since the Tigers were attempting to clinch a playoff spot, the White Sox wanted to do their best to spoil it.

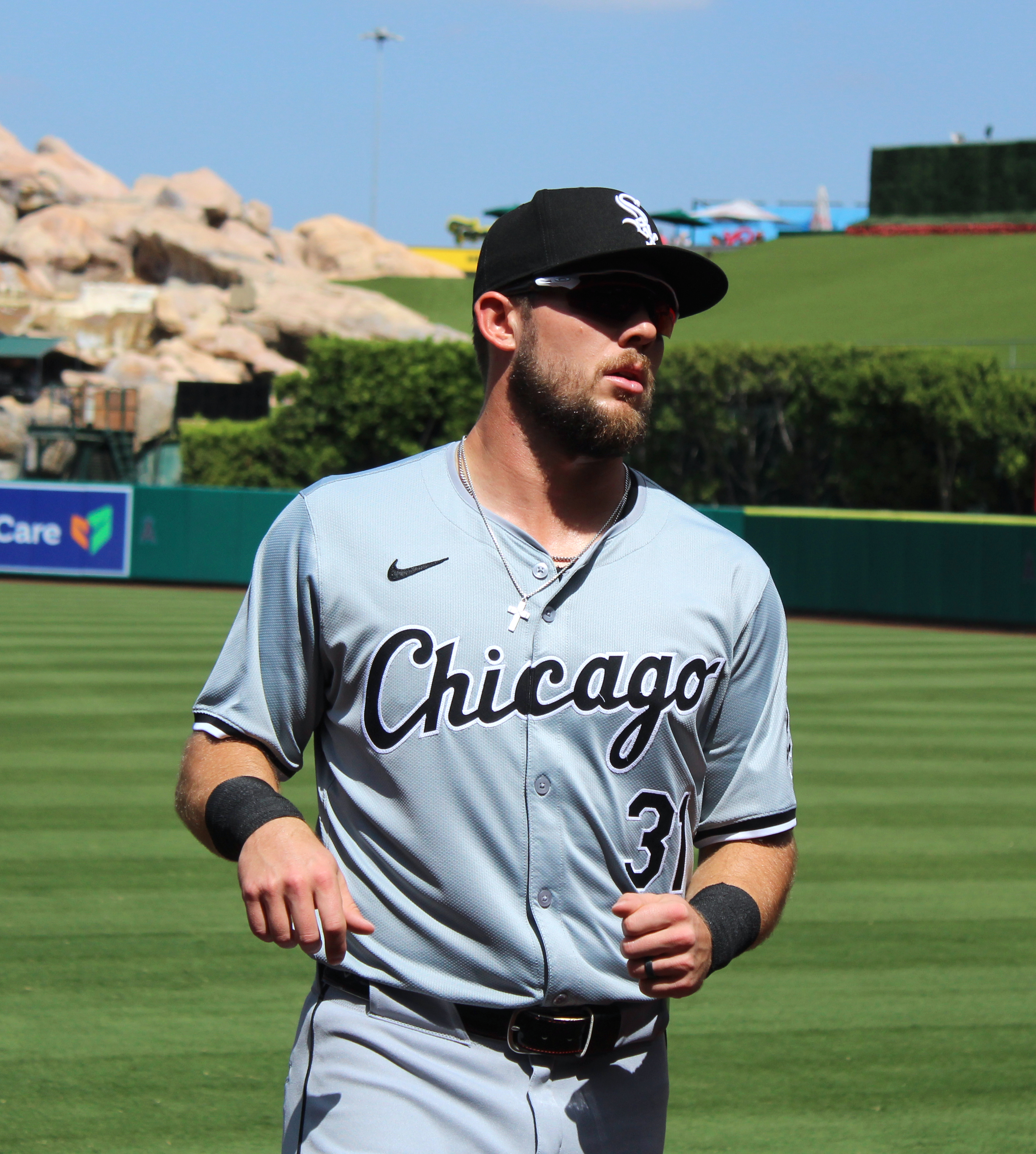
Chicago White Sox player Zach DeLoach

The September 27 game remained scoreless through the first four innings, with both teams' starting pitchers performing effectively. The Tigers' broke the deadlock in the bottom of the 5th inning, with Jake Rogers scoring from third base on a wild pitch thrown by Jared Shuster. Matt Vierling hit a sacrifice fly two pitches later, scoring Parker Meadows to put Detroit up 2–0.

The White Sox responded in the top of the 6th inning, with Zach DeLoach hitting a home run to right field, the first of his major league career, to cut the lead to 2–1. The Tigers extended their lead in the bottom of the 7th, when Andy Ibáñez led off with a double to right-center and reached third base due to a fielding error by center fielder Dominic Fletcher. Riley Greene hit a 412-foot double to score Ibáñez. Later in the inning, another wild pitch thrown by Fraser Ellard scored Vierling, pushing Detroit's lead to 4–1.

Detroit relied entirely on their bullpen for pitching, with multiple relievers combining to effectively limit the White Sox to a single run. After Brenan Hanifee started the game, rookie Brant Hurter was credited with the win after pitching four innings, while back end relievers Tyler Holton, Will Vest, and Jason Foley pitched the late innings, with Foley picking up his 28th save of the season.

The game's final out came when Andrew Vaughn flied out to right fielder Wenceel Pérez (who bumped into Meadows and fell as he made the catch) to end the game, which sent the Detroit crowd into a frenzy since the Tigers had secured a 2024 MLB Playoff berth with this win, their first since 2014, as well as sealed the White Sox's fate in the history books.

Sizemore stated that the season was "not the year we wanted" following the game, and expressed that while he began to grow frustrated well before the team was close to the loss record he stated that he was not sure if he would feel different if he had lost only 115 or 110 games instead. Pitcher Garrett Crochet remarked on the record: "Obviously it sucks." and that "We put ourselves in this position early on. We are where we are because of the way we played. But that's just all it is."

Following the game, the official White Sox Twitter page posted an image of a computer containing a list of "Things we'd rather do than read comments" as well as an image of the White Sox mascot, Southpaw, huddled in a dark corner captioned "slams laptop shut 'til tomorrow."

== Roster ==
2024 Chicago White Sox
Roster
Pitchers: 60 Justin Anderson; 57 Tanner Banks; 66 Prelander Berroa; 59 John Brebbia; 59 Sean Burke; 57 Ky Bush; 48 Jonathan Cannon; 52 Mike Clevinger; 45 Garrett Crochet; 62 Enyel De Los Santos; 46 Jake Eder; 61 Fraser Ellard; 20 Erick Fedde; 77 Chris Flexen; 63 Matt Foster; 64 Deivi García; 54 Tim Hill; 52 Jairo Iriarte; 46 Brad Keller; 34 Michael Kopech; 41 Chad Kuhl; 49 Jordan Leasure; 55 Dominic Leone; 65 Davis Martin; 43 Nick Nastrini; 67 Sammy Peralta; 27 Bryan Shaw; 51 Jared Shuster; 40 Michael Soroka; 33 Drew Thorpe; 54 Touki Toussaint; 37 Gus Varland; 36 Steven Wilson; 46 Jake Woodford	Catchers: 26 Korey Lee; 15 Martín Maldonado; 47 Chuckie Robinson; Infielders: 18 Jacob Amaya; 27 Brooks Baldwin; 29 Paul DeJong; 8 Nicky Lopez; 0 Danny Mendick; 10 Yoán Moncada; 44 Bryan Ramos; 1,28 Zach Remillard; 15 Nick Senzel; 17 Braden Shewmake; 50 Lenyn Sosa; 20 Miguel Vargas; 25 Andrew Vaughn	Outfielders: 23 Andrew Benintendi; 22 Oscar Colás; 31 Zach DeLoach; 27 Duke Ellis; 7 Dominic Fletcher; 30 Robbie Grossman; 74 Eloy Jiménez; 30 Corey Julks; 27 Rafael Ortega; 28 Tommy Pham; 12 Kevin Pillar; 88 Luis Robert; 32 Gavin Sheets	Manager: 5 Pedro Grifol; 24 Grady Sizemore; Coaches: 38 Jason Bourgeois (first base/outfield); 39 Drew Butera (catching); 73 Mike Gellinger (assistant hitting); 98 Miguel González (bullpen catcher); 28 Justin Jirschele (third base); 21 Ethan Katz (pitching); 75 Charlie Montoyo (bench); 18 Eddie Rodríguez (third base/infield); 96 Luis Sierra (bullpen catcher); 29 Doug Sisson (bench); 24 Grady Sizemore (baserunning); 99 Marcus Thames (hitting); 37 Mike Tosar (assistant hitting); 53 Matt Wise (bullpen)

== Player statistics ==
= Indicates team leader

=== Batting ===
Note: G = Games played; AB = At bats; R = Runs; H = Hits; 2B = Doubles; 3B = Triples; HR = Home runs; RBI = Runs batted in; SB = Stolen bases; BB = Walks; AVG = Batting average; SLG = Slugging average

Player	G	AB	R	H	2B	3B	HR	RBI	SB	BB	AVG	SLG
Jacob Amaya	23	67	4	12	1	0	0	3	1	4	.179	.294
Brooks Baldwin	33	114	9	24	6	0	2	8	4	6	.211	.316
Andrew Benintendi	135	477	50	109	20	0	20	64	3	41	.229	.396
Oscar Colás	13	33	1	9	0	0	0	4	0	4	.273	.273
Paul DeJong	102	337	39	77	14	0	18	41	2	14	.228	.430
Zach DeLoach	22	67	10	14	5	0	1	5	0	8	.209	.328
Duke Ellis	8	4	1	0	0	0	0	0	4	0	.000	.000
Dominic Fletcher	72	223	14	46	8	0	1	17	0	11	.206	.256
Robbie Grossman	25	71	6	15	4	0	0	4	2	13	.211	.268
Eloy Jiménez	65	229	18	55	9	0	5	16	3	18	.240	.345
Corey Julks	66	173	17	37	7	0	3	14	5	15	.214	.306
Korey Lee	125	377	36	79	14	1	12	37	6	17	.210	.347
Nicky Lopez	124	398	40	96	12	3	1	21	5	37	.241	.294
Martín Maldonado	48	135	9	16	3	0	4	11	0	8	.119	.230
Danny Mendick	47	132	13	26	7	0	3	8	6	6	.197	.318
Yoán Moncada	12	40	4	11	3	1	0	0	1	5	.275	.400
Rafael Ortega	14	14	4	1	0	0	0	1	2	2	.071	.071
Tommy Pham	70	271	33	72	14	1	5	19	6	25	.266	.380
Kevin Pillar	17	25	1	4	2	0	1	4	2	4	.160	.360
Bryan Ramos	32	99	13	20	4	0	3	11	2	7	.202	.333
Zach Remillard	15	33	3	8	1	1	0	1	1	5	.242	.333
Luis Robert Jr.	100	393	47	88	19	0	14	35	23	28	.224	.379
Chuckie Robinson	26	70	2	9	0	0	0	0	0	5	.129	.129
Nick Senzel	10	30	0	3	1	0	0	0	0	1	.100	.133
Gavin Sheets	139	451	35	105	24	1	10	45	2	43	.233	.357
Braden Shewmake	29	64	4	8	2	0	1	4	5	1	.125	.203
Lenyn Sosa	100	351	28	89	13	0	8	35	3	12	.254	.359
Miguel Vargas	42	135	11	14	3	0	2	7	2	17	.104	.170
Andrew Vaughn	149	570	55	140	30	1	19	70	2	38	.246	.402
Totals	162	5383	507	1187	226	9	133	485	90	395	.221	.340
Rank in AL	–	12	15	15	14	15	15	15	11	15	15	15

Source:Baseball Reference

=== Pitching ===
Note: W = Wins; L = Losses; ERA = Earned run average; G = Games pitched; GS = Games started; SV = Saves; IP = Innings pitched; H = Hits allowed; R = Runs allowed; ER = Earned runs allowed; BB = Walks allowed; SO = Strikeouts

Player	W	L	ERA	G	GS	SV	IP	H	R	ER	BB	SO
Justin Anderson	1	2	4.39	56	0	1	53.1	48	29	26	32	57
Tanner Banks	2	2	4.13	41	1	2	48.0	47	30	22	15	55
Prelander Berroa	1	0	3.32	17	0	0	19.0	15	7	7	13	26
John Brebbia	0	6	6.29	54	0	2	48.2	52	34	34	17	58
Sean Burke	2	0	1.42	4	3	0	19.2	12	4	3	7	22
Ky Bush	0	3	5.60	4	4	0	17.2	20	11	11	16	11
Jonathan Cannon	5	10	4.49	23	21	1	124.1	125	65	62	40	91
Mike Clevinger	0	3	6.75	4	4	0	16.0	22	13	12	9	15
Garrett Crochet	6	12	3.58	32	32	0	146.0	123	61	58	33	209
Enyel De Los Santos	0	0	3.63	15	0	1	17.1	13	7	7	9	13
Jake Eder	0	0	4.50	1	0	0	2.0	2	1	1	1	1
Fraser Ellard	2	3	3.75	25	0	1	24.0	18	12	10	12	26
Erick Fedde	7	4	3.11	21	21	0	121.2	105	43	42	34	108
Chris Flexen	3	15	4.95	33	30	0	160.0	180	95	88	63	123
Matt Foster	0	1	2.70	6	1	0	6.2	5	2	2	5	4
Deivi García	1	2	7.07	14	0	1	14.0	16	16	11	11	15
Tim Hill	1	0	5.87	27	0	0	23.0	41	19	15	10	13
Jairo Iriarte	0	1	1.50	6	0	0	6.0	3	3	1	8	6
Brad Keller	0	2	4.86	5	2	0	16.2	17	10	9	6	13
Michael Kopech	2	8	4.74	43	0	9	43.2	35	24	23	24	59
Chad Kuhl	0	2	5.06	31	1	1	53.1	56	33	30	25	54
Jordan Leasure	0	2	6.32	33	0	2	31.1	32	22	22	18	26
Dominic Leone	0	2	6.63	23	0	0	19.0	20	17	14	14	17
Davis Martin	0	5	4.32	11	10	0	50.0	50	25	24	23	47
Danny Mendick	0	0	0.00	1	0	0	1.0	2	0	0	0	0
Nick Nastrini	0	7	7.07	9	8	0	35.2	32	33	28	36	26
Sammy Peralta	0	0	4.80	9	0	0	15.0	21	9	8	7	11
Bryan Shaw	0	1	9.00	5	0	0	4.0	8	5	4	4	4
Jared Shuster	2	5	4.42	39	4	0	73.1	74	38	36	33	56
Michael Soroka	0	10	4.74	25	9	0	79.2	66	49	42	44	84
Drew Thorpe	3	3	5.48	9	9	0	44.1	35	29	27	21	25
Touki Toussaint	1	2	7.43	11	0	0	23.0	35	19	19	18	26
Gus Varland	1	0	3.54	19	0	0	20.1	23	9	8	4	24
Steven Wilson	1	6	5.71	40	0	0	34.2	29	29	22	26	34
Jake Woodford	0	2	10.80	2	2	0	8.1	15	10	10	5	7
Totals	41	121	4.68	162	162	21	1420.0	1397	813	738	643	1366
Rank in AL	15	1	15	–	–	15	15	15	15	15	15	9

Note: No league ERA qualifiers (162 innings pitched, 1 inning pitched per scheduled game).

Source:Baseball Reference

== Awards and honors ==
Pitcher Garrett Crochet won MLB Pitcher of the Month for June after he went 1–1 in six starts with an ERA of 1.91 along with a 0.93 WHIP in 37 2/3 innings while striking out 56 batters.

== Farm system ==
Level	Team	League	Manager
AAA	Charlotte Knights	International League	Pat Listach
AA	Birmingham Barons	Southern League	Sergio Santos
High-A	Winston-Salem Dash	South Atlantic League	Guillermo Quiróz
A	Kannapolis Cannon Ballers	Carolina League	Pat Leyland
Rookie	ACL White Sox	Arizona Complex League	Danny Gonzalez
Rookie	DSL White Sox	Dominican Summer League	Anthony Nunez

== See also ==
- List of worst Major League Baseball season win–loss records
- List of Major League Baseball longest losing streaks
