= List of Major League Baseball longest losing streaks =

This is a list of the longest team losing streaks in Major League Baseball history. Streaks started at the end of one season are carried over into the following season. Two lists are provided—one with streaks that consist entirely of regular-season games and one with streaks of playoff games only.

The 1889 Louisville Colonels hold the record for the longest losing streak in official MLB history at 26 games, though the 1875 Brooklyn Atlantics lost 31 consecutive games in the National Association, a number that is not considered official by MLB. In the modern two-league era, the longest losing streak belongs to the 1961 Philadelphia Phillies at 23 games. In the American League, the 1988 Baltimore Orioles and 2024 Chicago White Sox hold the record at 21 games. The longest losing streak consisting entirely of postseason games is 18, belonging to the Minnesota Twins (2004–2023).

The longest losing streak by a defending World Series Champion is 11, by the 1998 Florida Marlins and the 1986 Kansas City Royals.

== Key ==
^	Denotes streaks that included unofficial ties
**	Denotes streaks that spanned over two seasons
	Denotes streaks that are currently in progress
*	Denotes season in which team won the World Series

== Streak ==
=== Regular season ===
This list contains only the top 20 streaks consisting entirely of regular-season games.

Rank	Games Lost	Team	Season(s)	Season record(s)	Date	Score	Opponent	Date	Score	Opponent
Rank	Games Lost	Team	Season(s)	Season record(s)	Beginning (first defeat)			End (first victory)		
1	26	Louisville Colonels	1889	27–111	May 22, 1889	2–11	Baltimore Orioles	June 23, 1889	7–3	St. Louis Browns
2	24	Cleveland Spiders	1899	20–134	August 26, 1899	1–2	New York Giants	September 18, 1899	5–4	Washington Senators
3 (tie)	23	Pittsburgh Alleghenys	1890	23–113	August 12, 1890	12–13	Chicago Colts	September 4, 1890	6–2	Cleveland Spiders
3 (tie)	23	Philadelphia Phillies	1961	47–107	July 29, 1961	3–4	San Francisco Giants	August 20, 1961	7–4	Milwaukee Braves
5	22	Philadelphia Athletics	1890	54–78	September 16, 1890	1–5	Baltimore Orioles	Folded^{a}	N/A	N/A
6 (tie)	21	Baltimore Orioles	1988	54–107	April 4, 1988	0–12	Milwaukee Brewers	April 29, 1988	9–0	Chicago White Sox
6 (tie)	21	Chicago White Sox	2024	41–121	July 10, 2024	2–3	Minnesota Twins	August 6, 2024	5–1	Oakland Athletics
8 (tie)	20	Louisville Colonels	1894	36–94	May 28, 1894	2–4	Pittsburgh Pirates	June 19, 1894	9–4	Pittsburgh Pirates
8 (tie)	20	Boston Americans	1906	49–105	May 1, 1906	0–8	New York Highlanders	May 25, 1906	3–0	Chicago White Sox
8 (tie)	20	Philadelphia Athletics	1916	36–117	July 21, 1916	2–7	Cleveland Indians	August 9, 1916	7–1	Detroit Tigers
8 (tie)	20	Philadelphia Athletics	1943	49–105	August 7, 1943	1–3	New York Yankees	August 24, 1943	8–1	Chicago White Sox
8 (tie)	20	Montreal Expos	1969	52–110	May 13, 1969	3–10	Houston Astros	June 8, 1969	4–3	Los Angeles Dodgers
13 (tie)	19	Boston Beaneaters	1906	49–102	May 17, 1906	0–2	Cincinnati Reds	June 9, 1906	6–3	St. Louis Cardinals
13 (tie)	19	Cincinnati Reds	1914	60–94	September 5, 1914	2–12	St. Louis Cardinals	September 23, 1914	3–0	Boston Braves
13 (tie)	19	Detroit Tigers	1975	57–102	July 29, 1975	2–4	New York Yankees	August 16, 1975	8–0	California Angels
13 (tie)	19	Kansas City Royals	2005	56–106	July 28, 2005	5–10	Tampa Bay Devil Rays	August 20, 2005	2–1	Oakland Athletics
13 (tie)	19	Baltimore Orioles	2021	52–110	August 3, 2021	1–13	New York Yankees	August 25, 2021	10–6	Los Angeles Angels
18 (tie)	18	Cincinnati Reds	1876	9–56	July 11, 1876	2–8	New York Mutuals	August 25, 1876	3–1	Louisville Grays
18 (tie)	18	Louisville Colonels^	1894	36–94	August 15, 1894	4–14	Philadelphia Phillies	September 6, 1894	15‍–‍10	Boston Beaneaters
18 (tie)	18	St. Louis Browns	1897	29–102	September 3, 1897	1–22	Baltimore Orioles	September 27, 1897	5–4	Cincinnati Reds
18 (tie)	18	Washington Senators**	1903; 1904	43–94; 38–113	September 24, 1903	2–12	Cleveland Indians	May 5, 1904	9–4	New York Highlanders
18 (tie)	18	Philadelphia Athletics	1920	48–106	June 8, 1920	5–7	Cleveland Indians	June 28, 1920	6–2	Washington Senators
18 (tie)	18	Washington Senators	1948	56–97	September 3, 1948	2–6	New York Yankees	September 19, 1948	10–7	Chicago White Sox
18 (tie)	18	Washington Senators	1959	63–91	July 19, 1959	5–6 (10)	Kansas City Athletics	August 5, 1959	9–0	Cleveland Indians

=== Playoffs ===
This list contains only streaks consisting entirely of postseason games.

Rank	Games	Team	Season(s)	Date	Score	Opponent	Date	Score	Opponent
Rank	Games	Team	Season(s)	Beginning (first defeat)			End (first victory)		
1	18	Minnesota Twins	2004, 2006, 2009–2010, 2017, 2019–2020	October 6, 2004	6–7 (12)	New York Yankees	October 3, 2023	3–1	Toronto Blue Jays
2	13	Boston Red Sox	1986, 1988, 1990, 1995	October 25, 1986	5–6 (10)	New York Mets	September 29, 1998	11–3	Cleveland Indians
3	11	Philadelphia Phillies	1915, 1950, 1976	October 9, 1915	1–2	Boston Red Sox	October 4, 1977	7–5	Los Angeles Dodgers
4 (tie)	10	Milwaukee/Atlanta Braves	1958, 1969, 1982, 1991	October 6, 1958	0–7	New York Yankees	October 10, 1991	1–0	Pittsburgh Pirates
4 (tie)	10	Kansas City Royals	1980–1981, 1984–1985	October 19, 1980	3–4	Philadelphia Phillies	October 11, 1985	6–5	Toronto Blue Jays
4 (tie)	10	Baltimore Orioles	2014, 2016, 2023–2024	October 10, 2014	6–8	Kansas City Royals	Active		
7 (tie)	9	Texas Rangers	1996, 1998–1999	October 2, 1996	4–5 (12)	New York Yankees	October 6, 2010	5–1	Tampa Bay Rays
7 (tie)	9	San Diego Padres	1998, 2005–2006	October 17, 1998	6–9	New York Yankees	October 7, 2006	3–1	St. Louis Cardinals
7 (tie)	9	Chicago Cubs	2003, 2007–2008	October 12, 2003	0–4	Florida Marlins	October 7, 2015	4–0	Pittsburgh Pirates
7 (tie)	9	Los Angeles Angels	2005, 2007–2008	October 12, 2005	1–2	Chicago White Sox	October 5, 2008	5–4 (12)	Boston Red Sox
11 (tie)	8	Cleveland Indians/Guardians	2017–2018, 2020	October 8, 2017	0–1	New York Yankees	October 7, 2022	2–1	Tampa Bay Rays
11 (tie)	8	Cincinnati Reds	2012–2013, 2020, 2025	October 9, 2012	1–2	San Francisco Giants	Active		

=== World Series ===
This list contains only streaks consisting entirely of World Series games.

Rank	Games	Team	Season(s)	Date	Score	Opponent	Date	Score	Opponent
Rank	Games	Team	Season(s)	Beginning (first defeat)			End (first victory)		
1 (tie)	8	New York Yankees	1921, 1922, 1923	October 11, 1921	5–8	New York Giants	October 11, 1923	4–2	New York Giants
1 (tie)	8	Philadelphia Phillies	1915, 1950	October 9, 1915	1–2	Boston Red Sox	October 14, 1980	7–6	Kansas City Royals
1 (tie)	8	Atlanta Braves	1996, 1999	October 22, 1996	2–5	New York Yankees	October 26, 2021	6–2	Houston Astros
4 (tie)	7	San Diego Padres	1984, 1998	October 12, 1984	2–5	Detroit Tigers	Active		
4 (tie)	7	Detroit Tigers	2006, 2012	October 24, 2006	0–5	St. Louis Cardinals	Active		
6 (tie)	6	Detroit Tigers	1907, 1908	October 9, 1907	1–3	Chicago Cubs	October 12, 1908	8–3	Chicago Cubs
6 (tie)	6	St. Louis Cardinals	1928, 1930	October 4, 1928	1–4	New York Yankees	October 4, 1930	5–0	Philadelphia Athletics
6 (tie)	6	Chicago Cubs	1929, 1932	October 12, 1929	8–10	Philadelphia Athletics	October 2, 1935	3–0	Detroit Tigers
6 (tie)	6	Cleveland Indians	1954, 1995	September 29, 1954	2–5 (10)	New York Giants	October 24, 1995	7–6 (10)	Atlanta Braves
6 (tie)	6	Cincinnati Reds	1961, 1970	October 7, 1961	2–3	New York Yankees	October 14, 1970	6–5	Baltimore Orioles
6 (tie)	6	Los Angeles Dodgers	1978, 1981	October 13, 1978	1–5	New York Yankees	October 23, 1981	5–4	New York Yankees
6 (tie)	6	New York Yankees	1981, 1996	October 23, 1981	4–5	Los Angeles Dodgers	October 22, 1996	5–2	Atlanta Braves
6 (tie)	6	St. Louis Cardinals	1987, 2004	October 24, 1987	5–11	Minnesota Twins	October 21, 2006	7–2	Detroit Tigers

== Footnotes ==
- ^aThe Philadelphia Athletics folded following the 1890 season without breaking their losing streak.

== See also ==
- List of Major League Baseball longest winning streaks
- List of Major League Baseball franchise postseason droughts
- List of National Basketball Association longest losing streaks
