= Edgar Quero =

Cuban baseball player (born 2003)

Chicago White Sox – No. 26
- Catcher
- Born: April 6, 2003 (age 23); Cienfuegos, Cuba
- Bats: Switch Throws: Right

MLB debut
- April 17, 2025, for the Chicago White Sox

MLB statistics (through 2026 season)
- Batting average: .246
- Home runs: 8
- Runs batted in: 55
- Stats at Baseball Reference

Teams
- Chicago White Sox (2025–present)

Edgar Yoel Quero (born April 6, 2003) is a Cuban professional baseball catcher for the Chicago White Sox of Major League Baseball (MLB).

== Career ==
=== Los Angeles Angels ===
Quero signed with the Los Angeles Angels as an international free agent on February 26, 2021 and received a $200,000 signing bonus. He was assigned to the Rookie-level Arizona Complex League Angels to begin his professional career and was later promoted to the Low-A Inland Empire 66ers and batted .240 with five home runs for the 2021 season.

Quero returned to Inland Empire to begin the 2022 season. On June 13, Quero earned his first Prospect Team of the Week selection after going 7-for-18 (.389) with two home runs and eight runs batted in (RBI). On July 18, he earned another selection after going 11-for-23 (.478) with one home run and three RBI. On August 8, Quero earned his third selection to the weekly team after he went 10-for-25 (.400) with two home runs and eight RBI. On August 17, Quero was ranked as the third-best prospect in the Angels farm system, behind organizational newcomers Logan O'Hoppe and Zach Neto.

=== Chicago White Sox ===
On July 26, 2023, Quero and Ky Bush were traded to the Chicago White Sox in exchange for Lucas Giolito and Reynaldo López. He spent the remainder of the year with the Double-A Birmingham Barons, hitting .277 with three home runs and 22 RBI across 31 games.

Quero split the 2024 campaign between Double-A Birmingham and the Triple-A Charlotte Knights. In 98 appearances split between the two affiliates, he slashed a cumulative .280/.366/.463 with 16 home runs and 70 RBI. Quero was assigned to Charlotte to begin the 2025 campaign.

On April 16, 2025, Quero was selected to the 40-man roster and promoted to the major leagues for the first time; he made his MLB debut a day later. On July 4, Quero hit his first career home run, a solo shot off of Colorado Rockies starter Antonio Senzatela.

Quero hit his first home run of the 2026 season, a 2-run shot, to walk off the Chicago Cubs 9-8 in the 10th inning of a Crosstown Classic rivalry game on May 17.
