= Donovan Walton =

American baseball player (born 1994)

Athletics – No. 29
- Infielder
- Born: May 25, 1994 (age 32); Dallas, Texas, U.S.
- Bats: Left Throws: Right

MLB debut
- September 10, 2019, for the Seattle Mariners

MLB statistics (through September 23, 2026)
- Batting average: .223
- Home runs: 13
- Runs batted in: 55
- Stats at Baseball Reference

Teams
- Seattle Mariners (2019–2022); San Francisco Giants (2022, 2024); Philadelphia Phillies (2025); Los Angeles Angels (2026); Athletics (2026–present)

Donovan Robert Walton (born May 25, 1994) is an American professional baseball infielder for the Athletics of Major League Baseball (MLB). He has previously played in MLB for the Seattle Mariners, San Francisco Giants, Philadelphia Phillies, and Los Angeles Angels. Walton played college baseball for the Oklahoma State Cowboys and was selected by the Seattle Mariners in the fifth round of the 2016 MLB draft. He made his MLB debut in 2019.

== Amateur career ==
Walton attended Bishop Kelley High School in Tulsa, Oklahoma. He was drafted by the New York Mets in the 36th round of the 2012 MLB draft, but did not sign.

Walton attended Oklahoma State University, where he played college baseball for the Cowboys, playing primarily shortstop, along with a number of games at second base. In 2014 and 2015 he played collegiate summer baseball in the Cape Cod Baseball League for the Yarmouth-Dennis Red Sox, where he was named East Division MVP of the league's all-star game and co-MVP of the playoffs in Yarmouth-Dennis' 2015 championship season.

Walton was drafted by the Milwaukee Brewers in the 23rd round of the 2015 MLB draft, but did not sign and instead returned to OSU for his senior season. In 2016 in his senior season he batted .337/.428/.447. He was drafted by the Seattle Mariners in the 5th round of the 2016 MLB draft, after being noted for his plus glove and his ability to get on base, and signed with them.

== Professional career ==
=== Seattle Mariners ===
Walton played for the Low-A Everett AquaSox in 2016, hitting .281/.361/.421 with five home runs and 23 RBI in 178 at-bats, and played both shortstop and second base. He was named a 2016 Northwest League mid-season All Star. He split the 2017 season between the Arizona League Mariners and the High-A Modesto Nuts, hitting a combined .271/.350/.388 with four home runs and 29 RBI in 258 at-bats. He was named a 2017 MiLB organization All-Star.

In 2018, Walton split the season between Modesto and the Double—A Arkansas Travelers, hitting a combined .273/.365/.381 with four home runs and 41 RBI in 425 at-bats, while primarily playing second base. He was named a 2018 California League Northern Division mid-season All-Star, and a 2018 MiLB organization All-Star.

Walton returned to Arkansas for the 2019 minor league season, hitting .300/.390/.427 with 72 runs (7th in the Texas League), 11 home runs, 50 RBI, 10 hit by pitches (3rd), 63 walks (2nd), and 75 strikeouts in 490 at-bats, while primarily playing shortstop (where he had a .990 fielding percentage). He was awarded a 2019 MiLB Gold Glove, earned the Rawlings Minor League Gold Glove Award at shortstop, named a Texas League mid-season All-Star, and named an MiLB organization All-Star.

The Mariners selected Walton's contract and promoted him to the major leagues on September 10, 2019. He made his major league debut that night as a defensive replacement versus the Cincinnati Reds. In 2020 in the major leagues, Walton recorded two hits in 13 at-bats across five appearances.

On May 31, 2021, Walton hit his first career home run, a three-run shot off of James Kaprielian of the Oakland Athletics. With Triple–A Tacoma, he batted .304/.395/.519 with a career-high 13 home runs in 283 at-bats. With Seattle, Walton batted .206/.254/.365 with two home runs, seven RBI, and one stolen base over 24 appearances.

Walton made 12 appearances for Triple-A Tacoma during the 2022 season, slashing .294/.368/.510 with one home run, five RBI, and two stolen bases; he also played in one game for Seattle, failing to record a plate appearance and scoring a run.

=== San Francisco Giants ===
On May 11, 2022, the Mariners traded Walton to the San Francisco Giants in exchange for pitcher Prelander Berroa. He was assigned to the Triple-A Sacramento River Cats. and split time between the Giants and River Cats. On June 5, Walton hit his first career grand slam off of Braxton Garrett of the Miami Marlins. In 2022, with the Giants he batted .158/.180/.303 in 76 at-bats, playing 14 games at second base, 12 at shortstop, and one at pitcher. With Sacramento he batted .225/.345/.352 in 71 at-bats, playing seven games each at second base and shortstop, four each at left field and DH, and one at third base. On August 21, he was placed on the 60–day injured list with right shoulder inflammation. On November 18, he was non-tendered and became a free agent.

On December 6, 2022, Walton re-signed with the Giants on a minor league contract. On February 26, 2023, it was announced that Walton would miss the first month of the season after undergoing shoulder surgery in the offseason. In 71 games split between the rookie–level Arizona Complex League Giants, High–A Eugene Emeralds, Double–A Richmond Flying Squirrels, and Sacramento, Walton accumulated a .265/.357/.396 batting line with six home runs and 29 RBI. Walton elected free agency following the season on November 6.

On December 23, 2023, Walton re-signed with the Giants on a minor league contract. On April 2, 2024, Walton was the winning pitcher on record after tossing scoreless 11th and 12th innings against the Reno Aces. On September 13, the Giants selected Walton's contract, adding him to their major league roster. In 9 games for San Francisco, he slashed .136/.240/.273 with one home run, two RBI, and two walks. On November 1, Walton was removed from the 40–man roster and sent outright to Sacramento. He elected free agency three days later.

=== New York Mets ===
On November 15, 2024, Walton signed a minor league contract with the New York Mets. Walton made 73 appearances for the Triple-A Syracuse Mets in 2025, slashing .222/.315/.377 with 11 home runs and 37 RBI.

=== Philadelphia Phillies ===
On July 1, 2025, Walton was traded to the Philadelphia Phillies in exchange for cash considerations. In 50 appearances for the Triple-A Lehigh Valley IronPigs, he batted .339/.413/.424 with two home runs, 27 RBI, and three stolen bases. On September 8, the Phillies selected Walton's contract, adding him to their active roster. He made two appearances for Philadelphia, going 1-for-8 (.125) with one RBI. Walton was designated for assignment by the Phillies on September 24. He cleared waivers and was sent outright to Triple-A Lehigh Valley on September 26. On October 10, Walton elected free agency.

=== Los Angeles Angels ===
On December 12, 2025, Walton signed a minor league contract with the Los Angeles Angels. He began the regular season with the Triple-A Salt Lake Bees, slashing .282/.429/.481 with seven home runs, 33 RBI, and three stolen bases. On May 22, 2026, the Angels selected Walton's contract, adding him to their active roster. He made 32 appearances for Los Angeles, slashing .319/.354/.505 with three home runs and 12 RBI. Walton was designated for assignment by the Angels on July 8.

=== Athletics ===
On July 12, 2026, Walton was claimed off of waivers by the Athletics.

== Personal life ==
Walton’s father, Rob also played baseball at Oklahoma State prior to a minor league career with the Baltimore Orioles, eventually returning to OSU to serve as the pitching coach. His brother, Davis, played football at the University of Tulsa.
