= Trayce Thompson =

American-British baseball player (born 1991)

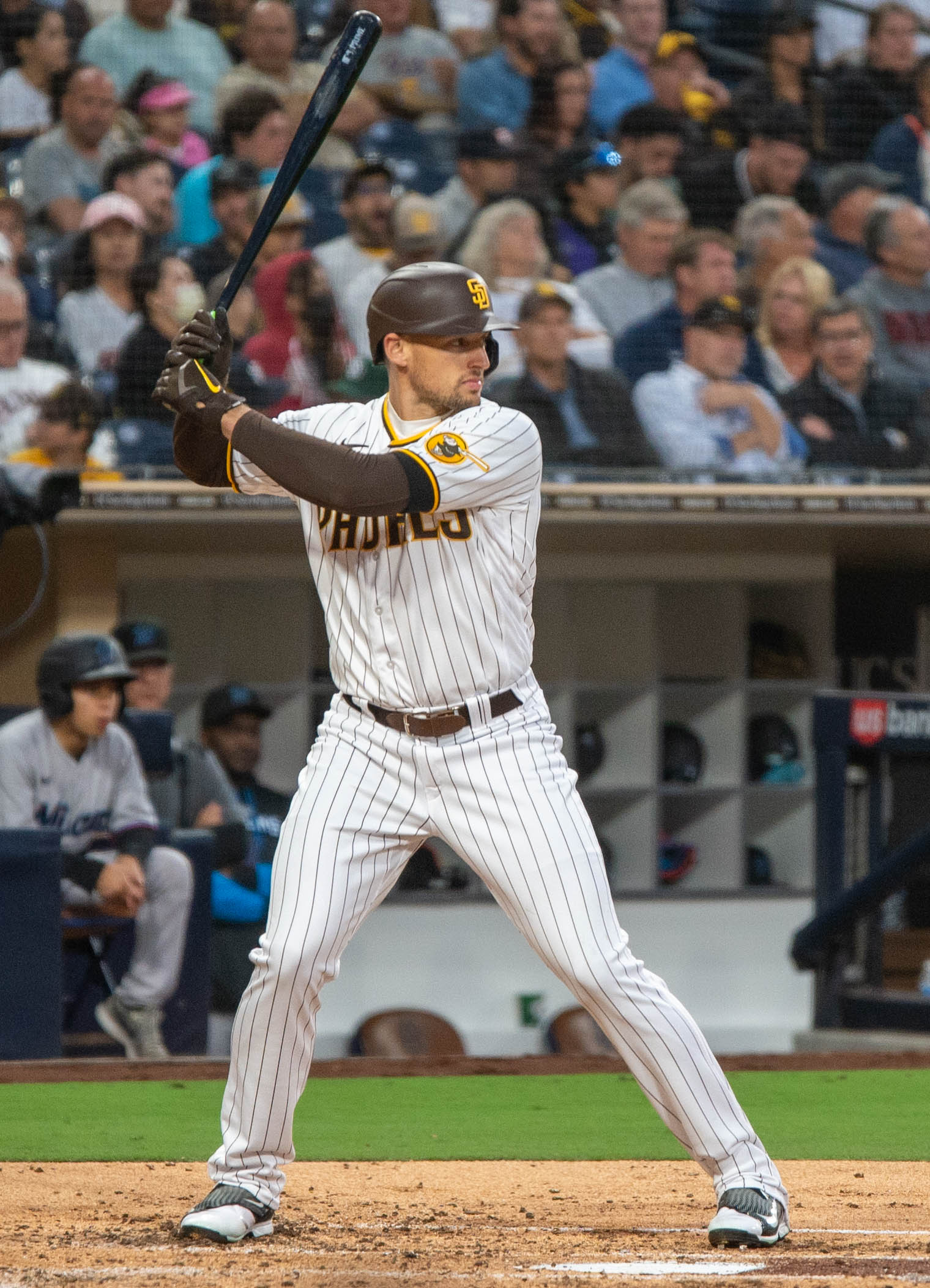
- Thompson batting for the Padres in 2022
- Outfielder
- Born: March 15, 1991 (age 35); Los Angeles, California, U.S.
- Batted: Right Threw: Right

MLB debut
- August 4, 2015, for the Chicago White Sox

Last MLB appearance
- October 1, 2023, for the Chicago White Sox

MLB statistics
- Batting average: .212
- Home runs: 45
- Runs batted in: 126
- Stats at Baseball Reference

Teams
- Chicago White Sox (2015); Los Angeles Dodgers (2016–2017); Oakland Athletics (2018); Chicago White Sox (2018); Chicago Cubs (2021); San Diego Padres (2022); Los Angeles Dodgers (2022–2023); Chicago White Sox (2023)

Trayce Nikolas Thompson (born March 15, 1991) is an American former professional baseball outfielder. He played in Major League Baseball (MLB) for the Chicago White Sox, Los Angeles Dodgers, Oakland Athletics, Chicago Cubs, and San Diego Padres. Thompson also played for the Great Britain National Team in the 2023 World Baseball Classic and the 2026 World Baseball Classic.

Trayce is the son of former National Basketball Association (NBA) player Mychal Thompson and the younger brother of current NBA player Klay Thompson and former NBA player Mychel Thompson.

== Early career ==
Trayce Nikolas Thompson was born on March 15, 1991, in Los Angeles, California. Thompson attended Santa Margarita Catholic High School in Rancho Santa Margarita, California. He initially committed to play college baseball for UCLA, but chose to play professionally instead.

== Professional career ==
=== Draft and minor leagues ===
The Chicago White Sox selected Thompson in the second round of the 2009 MLB draft, and he signed rather than enroll at UCLA. Thompson started his baseball career in 2009 at the Rookie level with the Bristol White Sox and Great Falls Voyagers. In 2009 combined, Thompson hit .198 in 106 at-bats. In 2010, Thompson played the whole season for the Kannapolis Intimidators of the Single–A South Atlantic League. In 2010, Thompson hit .229 in 210 at-bats. In 2011, Thompson again played the whole season with Kannapolis hitting .241 in 519 at-bats, and was named to the mid-season SAL all-star team. In 2012, Thompson moved up through the White Sox farm system, starting with the Winston-Salem Dash of the High–A Carolina League, then to the Birmingham Barons of the Double–A Southern League and Charlotte Knights of the Triple–A International League. In 2012, Thompson hit a combined .253 in 517 at-bats. Before the 2013 season, Thompson was ranked the White Sox #2 prospect. Thompson spent the entire 2013 season at Double-A Birmingham where he hit .229 in 507 at bats.

Thompson was added to the White Sox's 40-man roster on November 20, 2013.

=== Chicago White Sox (2015) ===
The White Sox promoted Thompson to the major leagues on August 3, 2015, and he made his debut the next day. He hit his first major league home run on August 11 against Hector Santiago.

=== Los Angeles Dodgers (2016–2017) ===
On December 16, 2015, Thompson, with Micah Johnson and Frankie Montas, were traded to the Los Angeles Dodgers as part of a three-team trade that sent Todd Frazier to the White Sox and José Peraza, Brandon Dixon, and Scott Schebler to the Cincinnati Reds. He made the Dodgers' 2016 opening day roster. He played 80 games for the Dodgers, hitting .225 with 13 homers and 32 RBI. He was placed on the disabled list on July 16 with a sore back. When his injury did not respond to treatment, he underwent an X-ray, which revealed multiple fractures in his back and kept him out of action for the rest of the season.

After recovering from his injuries, Thompson was optioned to the Oklahoma City Dodgers to begin the 2017 season, but was called up to the parent club partway through the season. Ultimately, he played 95 games for the Oklahoma City and 27 for the Dodgers. In his big-league appearances in 2017, he batted .122 with a .483 OPS and two RBIs. Thompson was designated for assignment on March 27, 2018.

=== Oakland Athletics (2018) ===
On April 3, 2018, Thompson was claimed off waivers by the New York Yankees and then two days later was claimed again, this time by the Oakland Athletics. The Athletics designated him for assignment on April 17, 2018. He had one hit in seven at-bats in three games for the Athletics.

=== Second stint with Chicago White Sox (2018) ===
Thompson was traded back to the White Sox on April 19, 2018, in return for cash considerations. The White Sox designated Thompson for assignment on June 22. In 48 games in the majors, he hit .116 with three home runs and nine RBI. He elected free agency following the season on November 2.

=== Cleveland Indians ===
On December 1, 2018, Thompson signed a minor league deal with the Cleveland Indians. He spent the 2019 season with the Triple-A Columbus Clippers, playing in 89 games and hitting .219/.294/.482 with 24 home runs, 56 RBI, and eight stolen bases. On August 2, 2019, Thompson was released.

=== Arizona Diamondbacks ===
On February 2, 2020, he signed a minor-league deal with the Arizona Diamondbacks. However he did not play in 2020 due to the cancellation of the minor league season because of the COVID-19 pandemic. He re-signed with the Diamondbacks on a minor-league deal on November 2, 2020, but played only four games for the Triple-A Reno Aces in 2021, going 5 for 18.

=== Chicago Cubs (2021) ===
On May 11, 2021, Thompson was traded to the Chicago Cubs for cash considerations. Thompson played in 88 games for the Triple-A Iowa Cubs, hitting .233 with 21 home runs and 63 RBI. On September 14, 2021, the Cubs selected Thompson's contract. On November 3, 2021, Thompson was outrighted off the 40-man roster and elected free agency two days later. He had seven hits in 28 at bats over 15 games.

=== San Diego Padres (2022) ===
On March 13, 2022, Thompson signed a minor league contract with the San Diego Padres. His contract was selected from the Triple-A El Paso Chihuahuas on April 28. On May 10, he was designated for assignment but declined the assignment and elected free agency. In six games in the majors, he had one hit in 14 at-bats.

=== Detroit Tigers ===
On May 19, 2022, Thompson signed a minor league deal with the Detroit Tigers organization. In 25 games for the Triple–A Toledo Mud Hens, Thompson hit .299/.352/.639 with eight home runs and 19 RBI.

=== Second stint with Los Angeles Dodgers (2022–2023) ===
On June 20, 2022, Thompson was traded back to the Dodgers organization in exchange for cash considerations. He subsequently had his contract selected to the active roster. Thompson remained on the Dodgers active roster the rest of the season, hitting .268 with 13 home runs and 39 RBI in 74 games.

On January 13, 2023, Thompson agreed to a one-year, $1.45 million contract with the Dodgers, avoiding salary arbitration. In his first start of the season, on April 1 against the Arizona Diamondbacks, Thompson hit three home runs, including a grand slam, and drove in eight runs. With this game, Thompson became the first player in Major League history to drive in eight or more runs in their season debut since the RBI became an official statistic in 1920. Thompson hit .155 in 36 games before he was placed on the injured list on June 3 with a strained left oblique. He was transferred to the 60-day injured list on June 11.

=== Third stint with Chicago White Sox (2023) ===
On July 28, 2023, Thompson, Nick Nastrini, and Jordan Leasure were traded to the Chicago White Sox in exchange for pitchers Lance Lynn and Joe Kelly. On August 3, Thompson was activated from the injured list. In 36 games for the White Sox, he batted .171/.261/.232 with one home run, 3 RBI, and 2 stolen bases. Following the season on November 3, Thompson was removed from the 40–man roster and sent outright to the Triple–A Charlotte Knights. He elected free agency on November 6.

=== New York Mets ===
On December 13, 2023, Thompson signed a minor league contract with the New York Mets. In 62 games for the Triple–A Syracuse Mets, he batted .228/.300/.500 with 16 home runs, 44 RBI, and 6 stolen bases. Thompson was released on July 3.

=== Chicago Cubs ===
On July 10, 2024, Thompson signed a minor league contract with the Chicago Cubs organization. In 45 appearances for the Triple-A Iowa Cubs, he batted .240/.335/.429 with seven home runs, 22 RBI, and three stolen bases. Thompson elected free agency following the season.

=== Boston Red Sox ===
On February 17, 2025, Thompson signed a minor league contract with the Boston Red Sox. He made 94 appearances for the Triple-A Worcester Red Sox, batting .226/.312/.405 with 13 home runs, 44 RBI, and 11 stolen bases. Thompson elected free agency following the season on November 6.

=== Tecolotes de los Dos Laredos ===
On April 27, 2026, Thompson signed with the Tecolotes de los Dos Laredos of the Mexican League. In four appearances for the team, he went 2-for-13 (.154) at the plate with nine strikeouts. Thompson was released by Dos Laredos on May 11.

=== Lexington Legends ===
On June 9, 2026, Thompson signed with the Lexington Legends of the Atlantic League of Professional Baseball. In 12 games for Lexington, he batted .238/.429/.595 with four home runs and nine RBI. On June 30, Thompson retired from professional baseball.

== International career ==
Thompson represents Great Britain in international competition; he is eligible as his father Mychal is from the Bahamas, which is part of the British Commonwealth. In the 2023 World Baseball Classic, he scored the British team's first ever run in their first WBC appearance, hitting a home run in the first inning off of Team USA starter Adam Wainwright. He batted .214/.353/.500 over the course of the tournament, with three hits and three walks over 14 at-bats.

== Personal life ==
Born in Los Angeles, Thompson is the youngest son of former NBA player Mychal Thompson and former University of Portland and University of San Francisco women's volleyball player Julie Thompson. Mychal played for the Los Angeles Lakers and currently works in sports radio. Both of his older brothers are basketball players: Mychel and Klay have played in the NBA. He is a childhood friend of Nolan Arenado.

Thompson is Catholic.
