= Jordan Leasure =

American baseball player (born 1998)

Philadelphia Phillies
- Pitcher
- Born: August 15, 1998 (age 28); Riverview, Florida, U.S.
- Bats: Right Throws: Right

MLB debut
- March 30, 2024, for the Chicago White Sox

MLB statistics (through 2026 season)
- Win–loss record: 7–9
- Earned run average: 4.96
- Strikeouts: 125
- Stats at Baseball Reference

Teams
- Chicago White Sox (2024–2026)

Jordan Davis Leasure (born August 15, 1998) is an American professional baseball pitcher for the Philadelphia Phillies of Major League Baseball (MLB). He made his MLB debut in 2024 with the Chicago White Sox.

== Career ==
Leasure attended Riverview High School in Riverview, Florida. The Tampa Bay Times named him to their All-Hillsborough County high school baseball team in 2016, his senior year. Leasure attended the University of Tampa, where he played college baseball for the Tampa Spartans.

=== Los Angeles Dodgers ===
Leasure was drafted by the Los Angeles Dodgers in the 14th round, with the 432nd overall selection, of the 2021 Major League Baseball draft. He spent his first professional season with the rookie–level Arizona Complex League Dodgers and Single–A Rancho Cucamonga Quakes, posting a 5.23 ERA across 8 games.

Leasure spent the 2022 campaign split between the High–A Great Lakes Loons and Double–A Tulsa Drillers. In 49 relief outings split between the two affiliates, he accumulated a 3.38 ERA with 84 strikeouts and 7 saves across 58 2/3 innings pitched. Leasure began the 2023 campaign with Tulsa, compiling a 3.09 ERA with 56 strikeouts and 9 saves in 29 appearances.

=== Chicago White Sox ===
On July 28, 2023, the Dodgers traded Leasure, Nick Nastrini and Trayce Thompson to the Chicago White Sox in exchange for Lance Lynn and Joe Kelly. He finished the year with the Triple–A Charlotte Knights, recording a 6.08 ERA with 23 strikeouts and two saves across 15 contests. After the season, Leasure played in the Arizona Fall League.

The White Sox invited Leasure to spring training in 2024. On March 27, 2024, Chicago selected Leasure's contract after he made the team's Opening Day roster. While playing for Triple–A Charlotte on June 16, Leasure was part of a seven–pitcher no-hitter against the Durham Bulls.

On June 6, 2025, Leasure recorded his first career win after tossing a scoreless eighth inning against the Kansas City Royals.

On May 29, 2026, Leasure was placed on the injured list due to a right flexor strain; he was transferred to the 60-day injured list the following day. On August 31, it was announced that Leasure had undergone surgery to repair a UCL tear, ruling him out for the entirety of the 2027 season. He was designated for assignment on November 18, 2026, following the signing of Dustin May.

=== Philadelphia Phillies ===
On November 20, the White Sox traded Leasure to the Philadelphia Phillies in exchange for Christian Coppola.
