= Prelander Berroa =

Dominican baseball player (born 2000)

Chicago White Sox – No. 52
- Pitcher
- Born: April 18, 2000 (age 26); Santo Domingo, Dominican Republic
- Bats: Right Throws: Right

MLB debut
- July 21, 2023, for the Seattle Mariners

MLB statistics (through 2024 season)
- Win–loss record: 1–0
- Earned run average: 3.05
- Strikeouts: 29
- Stats at Baseball Reference

Teams
- Seattle Mariners (2023); Chicago White Sox (2024)

Prelander Berroa (born April 18, 2000) is a Dominican professional baseball pitcher for the Chicago White Sox of Major League Baseball (MLB). He has previously played in MLB for the Seattle Mariners.

== Career ==
=== Minnesota Twins ===
Berroa signed with the Minnesota Twins as an international free agent on July 2, 2016. He made his professional debut in 2017 with the Dominican Summer League Twins, logging a 5.60 ERA with 16 strikeouts in 9 games.

Berroa split the 2018 season between the rookie–level Gulf Coast League Twins and rookie–level Elizabethton Twins. In 10 games (8 starts), he accumulated a 2.81 ERA with 41 strikeouts across 41 2/3 innings pitched. Berroa began the 2019 season back in Elizabethton, working to a 4.55 ERA in 7 starts.

=== San Francisco Giants ===
On July 31, 2019, the Twins traded Berroa, Jaylin Davis, and Kai-Wei Teng to the San Francisco Giants in exchange for Sam Dyson. He spent the remainder of the season with the Low–A Salem-Keizer Volcanoes, also appearing in one game for the rookie–level Arizona League Giants. In 4 starts for Salem-Keizer, Berroa struggled to a 9.56 ERA with 11 strikeouts across 16.0 innings pitched. He did not play in a game in 2020 due to the cancellation of the minor league season because of the COVID-19 pandemic.

Berroa spent the entire 2021 season with the Single–A San Jose Giants, pitching to a 5–6 record and 3.56 ERA with 135 strikeouts across 24 starts. He began the 2022 season with the High–A Eugene Emeralds, and recorded an 0.68 ERA in 4 starts.

=== Seattle Mariners ===
On May 11, 2022, the Giants traded Berroa to the Seattle Mariners in exchange for Donnie Walton. He split time between the High–A Everett AquaSox (for whom he logged a 2.41 ERA in 13 starts) and the Double–A Arkansas Travelers (for whom he posted a 4.37 ERA across 9 starts). On November 8, 2022, the Mariners added Berroa to their 40-man roster to protect him from the Rule 5 draft.

Berroa was optioned to the Double-A Arkansas Travelers to begin the 2023 season. In 24 games for Arkansas, he registered a 4–1 record and 2.93 ERA with 69 strikeouts and 2 saves in 46 innings of work. On July 19, 2023, Berroa was promoted to the major leagues for the first time. He made his major league debut on July 21, pitching 2/3 of an inning in relief against the Toronto Blue Jays.

=== Chicago White Sox ===
On February 3, 2024, the Mariners traded Berroa to the Chicago White Sox, alongside Zach DeLoach in exchange for Gregory Santos. He was optioned to the Triple–A Charlotte Knights to begin the 2024 season. In 17 appearances for the White Sox, Berroa compiled a 1–0 record and 3.32 ERA with 26 strikeouts across 19 innings pitched.

On March 7, 2025, it was announced that Berroa would miss the entirety of the 2025 season after undergoing Tommy John surgery.
