= Nick Nastrini =

American baseball player (born 2000)

Free agent
- Pitcher
- Born: February 18, 2000 (age 26); San Jose, California, U.S.
- Bats: Right Throws: Right

MLB debut
- April 15, 2024, for the Chicago White Sox

MLB statistics (through 2024 season)
- Win–loss record: 0–7
- Earned run average: 7.07
- Strikeouts: 26
- Stats at Baseball Reference

Teams
- Chicago White Sox (2024)

Nicholas Nastrini (born February 18, 2000) is an American professional baseball pitcher who is a free agent. He has previously played in Major League Baseball (MLB) for the Chicago White Sox.

== Amateur career ==
Nastrini attended Cathedral Catholic High School in San Diego, California, where he played on their baseball team. As a senior in 2018, he went 8-2 with a 2.41 ERA and 44 strikeouts over 49 1/3 innings. That summer, he played in the West Coast League for the Bellingham Bells.

Nastrini went undrafted in the 2018 Major League Baseball draft and enrolled at the University of California, Los Angeles (UCLA) to play college baseball for the UCLA Bruins. As a freshman at UCLA in 2019, Nastrini made four starts and posted a 1.37 ERA over 19 2/3 innings, missing a majority of the season due to thoracic outlet syndrome. He returned healthy that summer and played for the Falmouth Commodores of the Cape Cod Baseball League. He started four games in 2020 before the season was cancelled due to the COVID-19 pandemic. He played in the California Collegiate League for the Santa Barbara Foresters over the summer. As a junior in 2021, Nastrini made 12 appearances (seven starts) and went 2–2 with a 6.89 ERA, 48 strikeouts, and 38 walks over 31 1/3 innings.

== Professional career ==
=== Los Angeles Dodgers ===
The Los Angeles Dodgers selected Nastrini in the fourth round, with the 131st overall pick, of the 2021 Major League Baseball draft, and signed. Nastrini made his professional debut with the Arizona Complex League Dodgers and was promoted to the Rancho Cucamonga Quakes after one start. Over seven starts between the two clubs, he posted a 1.93 ERA with 32 strikeouts and seven walks in 14 innings. He opened the 2022 season with the Great Lakes Loons and was promoted to the Tulsa Drillers on August 15. Between the two levels, he made 27 starts and finished with a 6–4 record, a 3.93 ERA and 169 strikeouts over 116 2/3 innings. In 2023 with Tulsa, he made 17 starts and had a 5–3 record and 4.03 ERA.

=== Chicago White Sox ===
On July 28, 2023, Nastrini, Trayce Thompson, and Jordan Leasure were traded to the Chicago White Sox in exchange for pitchers Lance Lynn and Joe Kelly. He was assigned to the Birmingham Barons before being promoted to the Charlotte Knights in late August. Over 25 starts between Tulsa, Birmingham, and Charlotte, Nastrini went 9–5 with a 4.08 ERA and 139 strikeouts over 114 2/3 innings.

He was assigned to Charlotte to open the 2024 season. On April 15, 2024, Nastrini was selected to the 40-man roster and promoted to the major leagues for the first time. In nine games (eight starts) during his rookie campaign, Nastrini struggled to an 0–7 record and 7.07 ERA with 26 strikeouts across 35 2/3 innings pitched.

Nastrini was optioned to Triple-A Charlotte to begin the 2025 season, where he struggled to a 1–1 record and 7.51 ERA with 48 strikeouts over 20 games (six starts).

=== Miami Marlins ===
On July 1, 2025, Nastrini was claimed off waivers by the Miami Marlins; he was subsequently optioned to the Triple-A Jacksonville Jumbo Shrimp. After allowing two runs over two innings in his only appearance for Jacksonville, Nastrini was designated for assignment by the Marlins on July 9.

=== Los Angeles Dodgers (second stint) ===
On July 11, 2025, Nastrini was claimed off waivers by the Los Angeles Dodgers. On July 18, he was removed from the 40-man roster and sent outright to the Triple-A Oklahoma City Comets. He only pitched in three games for them, walking seven batters, six of whom scored, and throwing three wild pitches in only one inning.

Nastrini was assigned to the Double-A Tulsa Drillers to begin the 2026 campaign, where he appeared in one game, walking three batters without recording an out. Nastrini was released by the Dodgers organization on April 7, 2026.
