= Zach DeLoach =

American baseball player (born 1998)

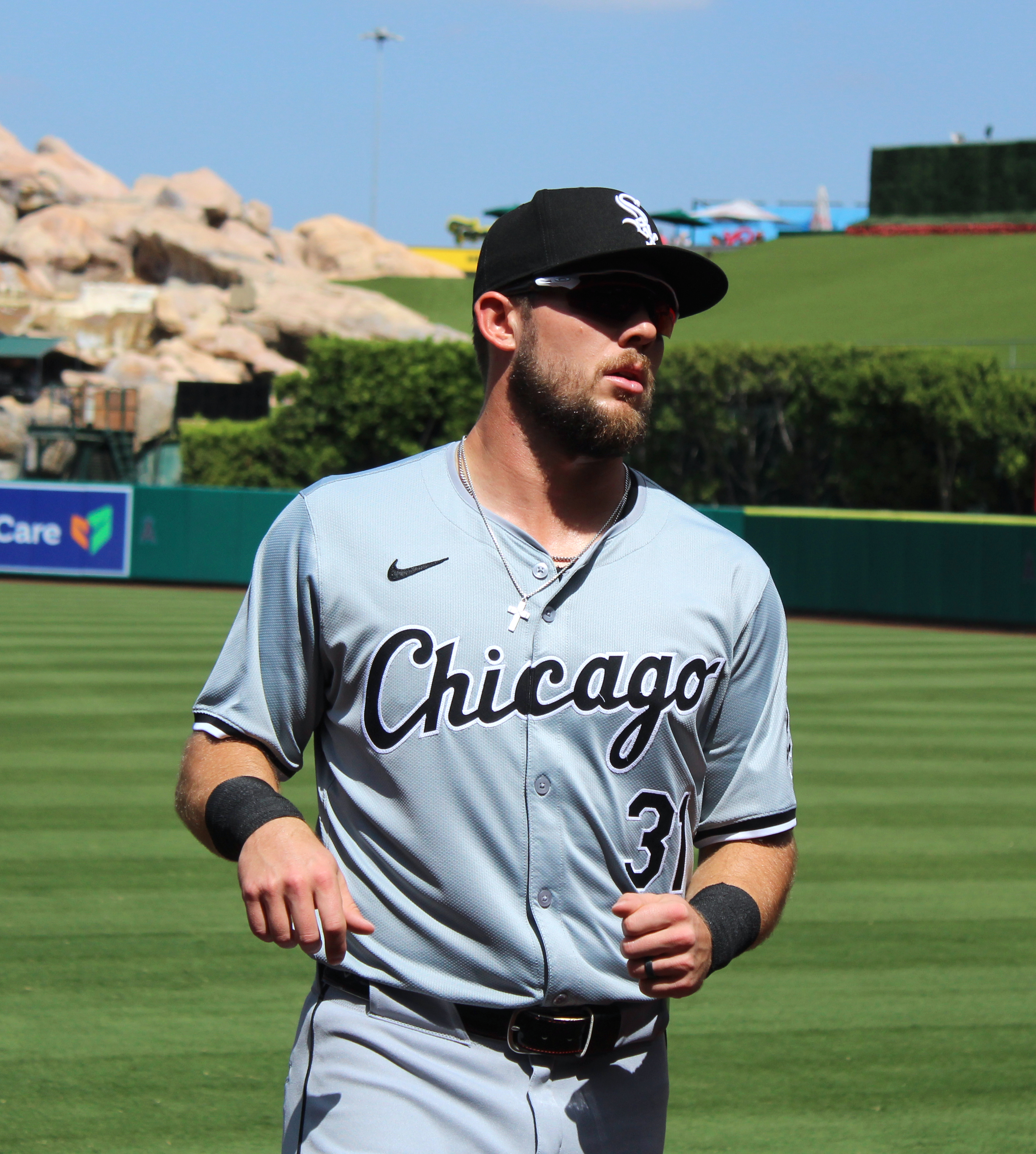
- DeLoach with the White Sox in 2024
- Outfielder
- Born: August 18, 1998 (age 27); Irving, Texas, U.S.
- Batted: Left Threw: Right

MLB debut
- May 22, 2024, for the Chicago White Sox

Last MLB appearance
- September 29, 2024, for the Chicago White Sox

MLB statistics
- Batting average: .209
- Home runs: 1
- Runs batted in: 5
- Stats at Baseball Reference

Teams
- Chicago White Sox (2024)

Zachary Dixon DeLoach (born August 18, 1998) is an American former professional baseball outfielder. He played in Major League Baseball (MLB) for the Chicago White Sox.

== Amateur career ==
DeLoach grew up in Lewisville, Texas, and attended Hebron High School. He played college baseball for the Texas A&M Aggies for three seasons. He started 61 games as a true freshman in 2018 and hit .264. DeLoach played collegiate summer baseball for the Wisconsin Woodchucks of the Northwoods League and was named a league All-Star after hitting .323 with five home runs, 17 doubles, 38 RBI and 10 stolen bases. He hit for a .200 average in his sophomore season. After the 2019 season he played for the Falmouth Commodores in the Cape Cod Baseball League, where he was named a league all-star and led the league with a .353 batting average. As a junior in 2020, DeLoach batted .421 with six home runs, 17 RBI, and 25 runs scored in 18 games before the season was cut short due to the coronavirus pandemic.

== Professional career ==
=== Seattle Mariners ===
The Seattle Mariners drafted DeLoach in the second round, with the 43rd overall selection, of the 2020 Major League Baseball draft. After signing, he was assigned to the Mariners' alternate training site as the minor league season was canceled due to the coronavirus pandemic. DeLoach began the 2021 season with the Everett AquaSox of the High-A West. He was promoted to the Arkansas Travelers of the Double-A Central after batting .313 with nine home runs and 37 RBI in 58 games with the AquaSox. Over 49 games with the Travelers to end the season, he hit .227/.338/.384 with five home runs and 22 RBI. He played in the Arizona Fall League for the Peoria Javelinas after the season, batting .162/.329/.265 with one home runs and 9 RBI.

=== Chicago White Sox ===
On February 3, 2024, the Mariners traded DeLoach to the Chicago White Sox, alongside Prelander Berroa in exchange for Gregory Santos. He was optioned to the Triple–A Charlotte Knights to begin the 2024 season. On May 22, DeLoach was promoted to the major leagues for the first time following an injury to Eloy Jiménez. In 22 games for Chicago, he batted .209/.293/.328 with one home run and five RBI.

DeLoach was designated for assignment by the White Sox on February 3, 2025. He cleared waivers and was sent outright to Triple-A Charlotte on February 7. On July 8, DeLoach was placed on the full-season injured list, ending his season. In 51 appearances for Charlotte, he batted .236/.326/.414 with five home runs, 22 RBI, and four stolen bases. DeLoach was released by the White Sox organization on December 20.
