= Ky Bush =

American baseball player (born 1999)

Chicago White Sox
- Pitcher
- Born: November 12, 1999 (age 26); Ogden, Utah, U.S.
- Bats: Left Throws: Left

MLB debut
- August 5, 2024, for the Chicago White Sox

MLB statistics (through 2024 season)
- Win–loss record: 0–3
- Earned run average: 5.60
- Strikeouts: 11
- Stats at Baseball Reference

Teams
- Chicago White Sox (2024)

Kyler Spencer Bush (born November 12, 1999) is an American professional baseball pitcher in the Chicago White Sox organization. He was selected by the Los Angeles Angels in the second round of the 2021 MLB draft and made his Major League Baseball (MLB) debut in 2024 with the White Sox.

== Amateur career ==
Bush grew up in Ogden, Utah and attended Fremont High School. As a senior, he had a 5–2 win–loss record with 2.51 earned run average (ERA) and 57 strikeouts over 39 innings pitched and was named first team All-State. Bush was selected in the 40th round of the 2018 Major League Baseball draft by the Kansas City Royals, but opted not to sign with the team.

Bush enrolled at Washington State University to play college baseball for the Washington State Cougars, where he pitched in 19 games as a freshman and finished the season with 0–5 record with a 12.69 ERA. He transferred to Central Arizona College before his sophomore year and went 5–1 with a 2.43 ERA over seven starts before the season was cut short by the COVID-19 pandemic. Bush transferred to Saint Mary's College to continue his career with the Saint Mary's Gaels, and was named first team All-West Coast Conference as a junior after posting a 7–5 record with a 2.99 ERA in 14 starts.

== Professional career ==
=== Los Angeles Angels ===
The Los Angeles Angels selected Bush in the second round, with the 45th overall pick, in the 2021 Major League Baseball draft. He signed with the team and received a $1.75 million signing bonus. Bush was assigned to the High-A Tri-City Dust Devils to start his professional career, where he made five starts and posted a 4.50 ERA and struck out 20 batters over 12 innings pitched.

Bush began the 2022 season on the Opening Day roster of the Double–A Rocket City Trash Pandas. In 21 starts for the club, he logged a 7–4 record and 3.67 ERA with 101 strikeouts across 103 innings of work. Bush returned to Rocket City in 2023, posting a 5.88 ERA with 33 strikeouts over 6 starts.

=== Chicago White Sox ===
On July 26, 2023, Bush and Edgar Quero were traded to the Chicago White Sox in exchange for Lucas Giolito and Reynaldo López. He made 9 starts for the Double–A Birmingham Barons down the stretch, registering a 3–4 record and 6.70 ERA with 36 strikeouts.

Bush began the 2024 season with Birmingham, and was promoted to the Triple–A Charlotte Knights in July. On August 5, 2024, Bush was selected to the 40-man roster and promoted to the major leagues for the first time. He made his MLB debut that day against the Oakland Athletics, recording three strikeouts, five walks, and three earned runs in a 5–1 loss. In 4 starts for Chicago, Bush logged an 0–3 record and 5.60 ERA with 11 strikeouts across 17 2/3 innings pitched.

On February 11, 2025, general manager Chris Getz announced that Bush would undergo Tommy John surgery and miss the entirety of the 2025 season. On September 4, 2026, Bush was shut down for the remainder of the season due to a lat strain, having failed to make an appearance for Chicago during the year. On November 2, he was removed from the 40–man roster and sent outright to Triple–A Charlotte.
