= Gregory Santos =

Dominican baseball player (born 1999)

Free agent
- Pitcher
- Born: August 28, 1999 (age 27); San Cristóbal, Dominican Republic
- Bats: Right Throws: Right

MLB debut
- April 22, 2021, for the San Francisco Giants

MLB statistics (through May 9, 2026)
- Win–loss record: 3–6
- Earned run average: 4.14
- Strikeouts: 78
- Stats at Baseball Reference

Teams
- San Francisco Giants (2021–2022); Chicago White Sox (2023); Seattle Mariners (2024–2025); San Francisco Giants (2026)

Gregory Omar Santos (born August 28, 1999) is a Dominican professional baseball pitcher who is a free agent. He has previously played in Major League Baseball (MLB) for the San Francisco Giants, Chicago White Sox and Seattle Mariners. He signed with the Boston Red Sox as an international free agent in 2015.

== Career ==
=== Boston Red Sox ===
Santos signed with the Boston Red Sox as an international free agent on August 28, 2015, for $275,000. He spent the 2016 season with the Dominican Summer League Red Sox, going 3–3 with a 4.17 ERA and 25 strikeouts over 41 innings.

Santos made 8 starts for the DSL Red Sox in 2017, posting a 2–0 record and 0.89 ERA with 24 strikeouts across 30 1/3 innings pitched.

=== San Francisco Giants ===
==== 2017–2019 ====
On July 26, 2017, Santos and Shaun Anderson were traded to the San Francisco Giants in exchange for Eduardo Núñez. He split the 2017 season between the DSL Red Sox and the Dominican Summer League Giants, going a combined 3–0 with a 1.29 ERA and 41 strikeouts over 49 innings.

He played for the Salem-Keizer Volcanoes in 2018, posting a 2–5 record with a 4.53 ERA over 49 2/3 innings, and was named a Northwest League mid-season All Star. He played for the Augusta GreenJackets in 2019, going 1–5 with a 2.86 ERA over 34 2/3 innings. Santos missed the second half of the 2019 season due to shoulder issues.

==== 2020–2022 ====
Santos did not play in a game in 2020 due to the cancellation of the minor league season because of the COVID-19 pandemic. On November 20, 2020, Santos was added to the 40-man roster, in order to be protected from the Rule 5 draft.

On April 22, 2021, Santos was promoted to the major leagues for the first time. He made his MLB debut that day against the Miami Marlins, pitching a scoreless inning of relief, and was the 6th-youngest player in the NL. In the game, he also notched his first two major league strikeouts, punching out Magneuris Sierra and Jazz Chisholm Jr. On April 28, Santos was optioned to the Giants' alternate site in Sacramento to make room for new outfielder Mike Tauchman. He later began his minor league season with the Triple-A Sacramento River Cats.

On June 29, 2021, Santos was suspended 80 games after he tested positive for the banned androgen and anabolic steroid Stanozolol.

He played in 2021 for the Scottsdale Scorpions, for whom he was 0–1 with a 4.15 ERA in 10 relief appearances, and was named an Arizona Fall League Rising Star.

In 2022 playing in the minors for Sacramento and briefly for the ACL Giants Black, he was a combined 1–2 with one save and a 4.63 ERA in 35 games (2 starts) in which he pitched 35 innings. In 2022 with the Giants he made two relief appearances, and in 3.2 innings gave up 3 hits, 3 walks, and had two strikeouts.

On December 19, 2022, Santos was designated for assignment following the signing of Sean Manaea.

=== Chicago White Sox ===
On December 22, 2022, Santos was traded to the Chicago White Sox for minor league pitcher Kade McClure. Santos made 60 relief appearances for Chicago in 2023, recording a 3.39 ERA with 66 strikeouts and 5 saves across 66 1/3 innings pitched.

=== Seattle Mariners ===
On February 3, 2024, the White Sox traded Santos to the Seattle Mariners in exchange for right-handed pitcher Prelander Berroa, outfielder Zach DeLoach, and a Round B Competitive Balance draft pick, which was used to draft Blake Larson. He began the year on the injured list with a right lat strain. Santos was transferred to the 60-day injured list on April 25. He was activated from the injured list on July 8. In eight appearances for Seattle, Santos recorded a 4.91 ERA with six strikeouts across 7 1/3 innings pitched.

Santos made another eight appearances for the Mariners in 2025, compiling a 1–1 record and 5.14 ERA with no strikeouts over seven innings of work. On April 25, 2025, Santos was placed on the 15-day injured list due to right knee inflammation; it was announced that he would require a cleanup surgery to repair cartilage. He was transferred to the 60-day injured list on April 29. On November 21, Santos was non-tendered by Seattle and became a free agent.

=== San Francisco Giants (second stint) ===
On December 17, 2025, Santos signed a minor league contract with the San Francisco Giants. He was assigned to the Triple-A Sacramento River Cats to begin the regular season, recording a 2.45 ERA with six strikeouts and three saves over eight appearances. On April 29, 2026, the Giants selected Santos' contract, adding him to their active roster. He made three appearances for San Francisco, recording a 3.60 ERA with one strikeout over five innings of work. On July 6, Santos was removed from the 40-man roster and sent outright to Sacramento. Two days later, Santos elected free agency.
