= Bryan Ramos =

Cuban baseball player (born 2002)

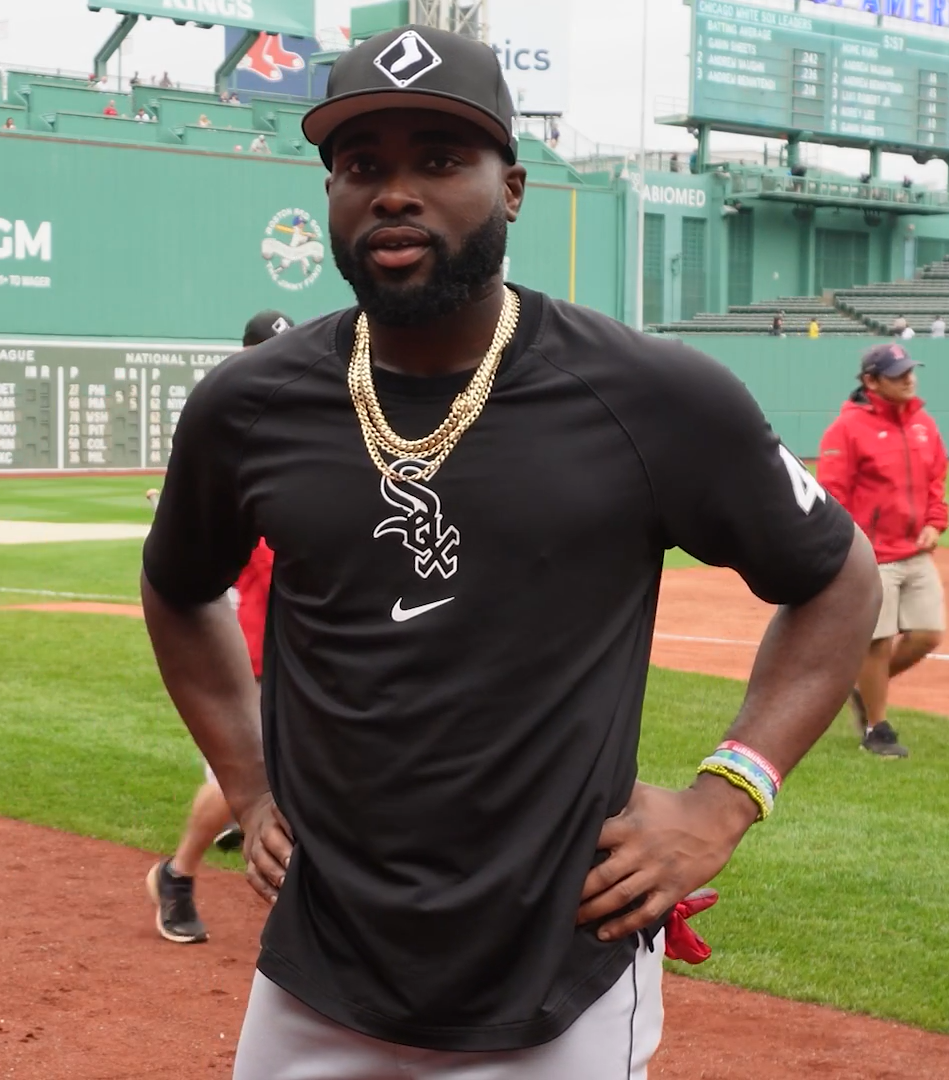
- Ramos with the Chicago White Sox in 2024

Philadelphia Phillies
- Third baseman
- Born: March 12, 2002 (age 24); Havana, Cuba
- Bats: Right Throws: Right

MLB debut
- May 4, 2024, for the Chicago White Sox

MLB statistics (through 2025 season)
- Batting average: .198
- Home runs: 3
- Runs batted in: 13
- Stats at Baseball Reference

Teams
- Chicago White Sox (2024–2025)

Bryan Ramos (born March 12, 2002) is a Cuban professional baseball third baseman in the Philadelphia Phillies organization. He has previously played in Major League Baseball (MLB) for the Chicago White Sox.

== Professional career ==
=== Chicago White Sox ===
Ramos signed with the Chicago White Sox as an international free agent on July 2, 2018. He made his professional debut in 2019 with the Arizona League White Sox, playing in 51 games and hitting .277/.353/.415 with four home runs and 26 runs batted in (RBI).

Ramos did not play in a game in 2020 due to the cancellation of the minor league season because of the COVID-19 pandemic. He returned in action in 2021 to play for the Single-A Kannapolis Cannon Ballers and played 2022 with the High-A Winston-Salem Dash and Double-A Birmingham Barons.

On November 15, 2022, the White Sox added Ramos to their 40-man roster to protect him from the Rule 5 draft. Ramos was optioned to Double-A Birmingham to begin the 2023 season. In 77 games, he batted .272/.369/.457 with 14 home runs and 48 RBI.

Ramos was again optioned to Double-A Birmingham to begin the 2024 season. In 24 games, he slashed .182/.265/.307 with 2 home runs and 11 RBI.

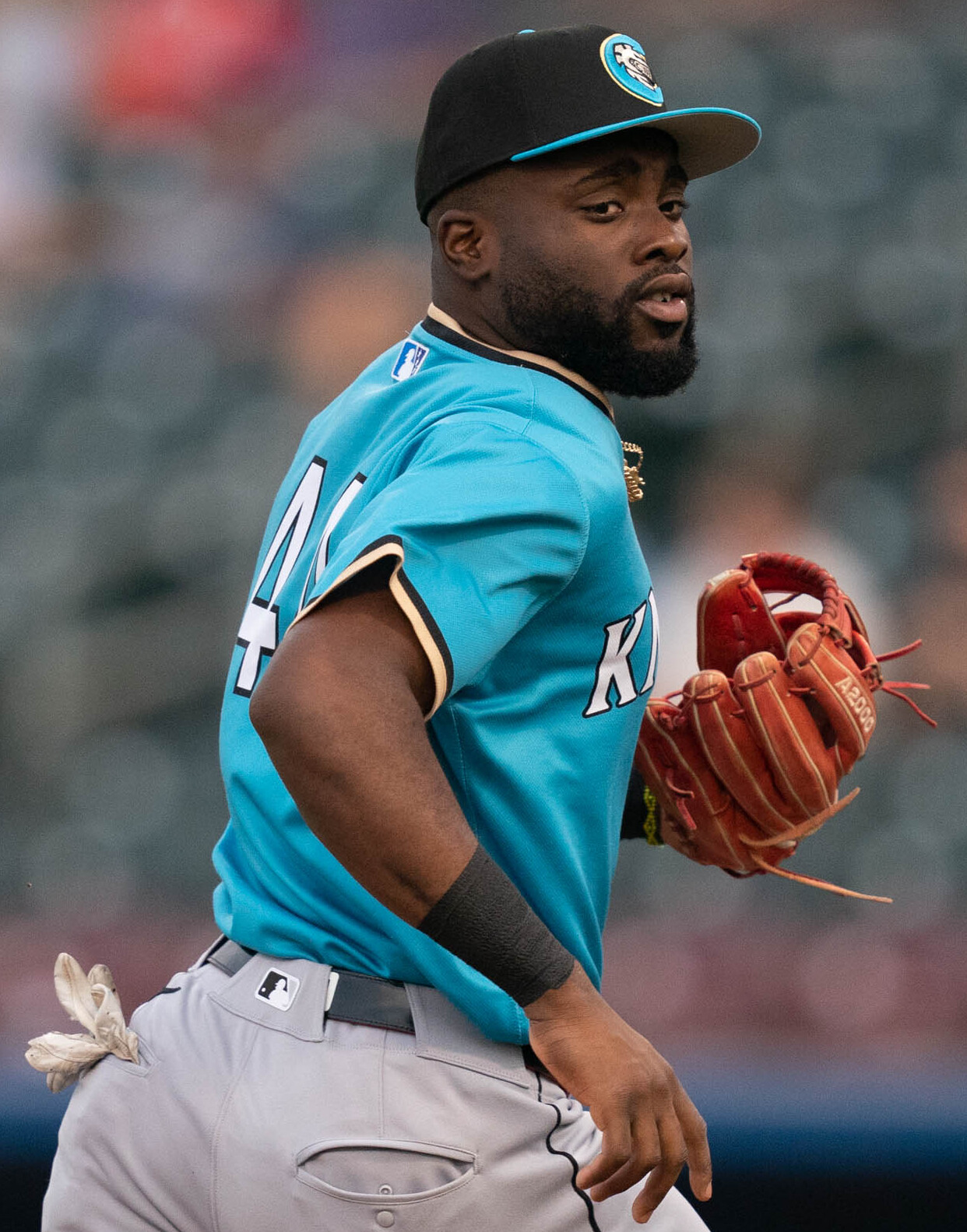
Ramos with the Charlotte Knights in 2025

On May 4, 2024, Ramos was promoted to the major leagues for the first time after Danny Mendick was placed on the injured list due to lower back tightness. Ramos appeared in the ninth inning as a defensive replacement against the St. Louis Cardinals. He made 32 appearances for the White Sox during his rookie campaign, batting .202/.252/.333 with three home runs and 11 RBI.

Ramos played for the Triple-A Charlotte Knights for most of the 2025 season. He joined the White Sox on September 1, 2025. After going 2-for-12 in four games for Chicago, Ramos returned to Triple-A.

On January 29, 2026, Ramos was designated for assignment by the White Sox following the signing of Seranthony Domínguez.

=== Baltimore Orioles ===
On February 1, 2026, Ramos was traded to the Baltimore Orioles in exchange for cash considerations. On February 6, Ramos was claimed off waivers by the St. Louis Cardinals. The Cardinals designated him for assignment on February 16 and he returned to the Orioles on another waiver claim four days later. On March 25, Ramos was designated for assignment by the Orioles after failing to make the team's Opening Day roster. The following day, he cleared waivers and was sent outright to the Triple-A Norfolk Tides. In 100 games with Triple-A Norfolk Tides he batted .216/.326/.320 with 6 home runs, 27 RBIs and 9 stolen bases. He elected free agency on November 2.

=== Philadelphia Phillies ===
On November 11, 2026, Ramos signed a minor league contract with the Philadelphia Phillies.

== Personal life ==
In 2024, Ramos became a United States citizen.
