= Jonathan Cannon =

American baseball player (born 2000)

Chicago White Sox – No. 48
- Pitcher
- Born: July 19, 2000 (age 26); Columbia, South Carolina, U.S.
- Bats: Right Throws: Right

MLB debut
- April 17, 2024, for the Chicago White Sox

MLB statistics (through 2026 season)
- Win–loss record: 9–20
- Earned run average: 5.14
- Strikeouts: 181
- Stats at Baseball Reference

Teams
- Chicago White Sox (2024–present)

Jonathan Patrick Cannon (born July 19, 2000) is an American professional baseball pitcher for the Chicago White Sox of Major League Baseball (MLB). He made his MLB debut in 2024.

== Amateur career ==
Cannon attended Centennial High School in Roswell, Georgia. In 2019, his senior season, he had a 4–1 win–loss record with a 0.51 earned run average (ERA) alongside batting .368 with two home runs. He went unselected in the 2019 Major League Baseball draft, and fulfilled his commitment to play college baseball at the University of Georgia.

In 2020, Cannon's freshman season at Georgia, he pitched 11 1/3 innings, striking out 12, walking two, and giving up no earned runs before the season was cancelled due to the COVID-19 pandemic. He spent the summer playing for the Gainesville Braves of the Sunbelt Baseball League, a team coached by Micah Owings. Cannon missed the beginning of the 2021 season while recovering from mononucleosis. He appeared in 13 games (12 starts) for the season, going 4–2 with a 3.98 ERA, 57 strikeouts, and 13 walks over 63 1/3 innings. He was considered a top prospect for the 2021 Major League Baseball draft, but went unselected. Following the season's end, he played collegiate summer baseball with the Orleans Firebirds of the Cape Cod Baseball League. For the 2022 season, Cannon was named Georgia's Opening Day starter. He missed time during the season due to a forearm injury. Over 13 starts for the season, he went 9–4 with a 4.02 ERA over 78 1/3 innings.

== Professional career ==
=== Minor leagues ===
The Chicago White Sox selected Cannon in the third round, with the 101st overall selection, of the 2022 Major League Baseball draft. He signed with the team for $925,000.

Cannon made his professional debut with the Arizona Complex League White Sox and was later promoted to the Kannapolis Cannon Ballers. Over 7 1/3 innings, he gave up one run while striking out four batters and walking three. He was assigned to the Winston-Salem Dash to open the 2023 season and was promoted to the Birmingham Barons in mid-July. He was selected to represent the White Sox at the 2023 All-Star Futures Game. Over 25 starts between the two teams, Cannon went 6–6 with a 4.46 ERA and 106 strikeouts over 121 innings. Cannon was assigned to the Charlotte Knights to open the 2024 season.

=== Major leagues ===
On April 16, 2024, Cannon was selected to the 40-man roster and promoted to the major leagues for the first time. He made his MLB debut the next day as the White Sox starting pitcher against the Kansas City Royals and gave up one run across five innings. Cannon was optioned back to Charlotte on April 28, and then recalled by the White Sox on June 7, with whom he then played the remainder of the season. He recorded his first MLB win on June 18 after pitching 8 2/3 scoreless innings with four strikeouts against the Houston Astros in a 2-0 White Sox win. Cannon appeared in 23 games (21 starts) for the White Sox, going 5–10 with a 4.49 ERA over 124 1/3 innings.

Cannon opened the 2025 season in Chicago's starting rotation. Cannon missed time during the season due to a back injury and was also moved to the bullpen after struggles in the starting rotation. He was also optioned to Charlotte twice during the season on August 8 and September 5. Cannon appeared in 22 games (17 starts) for the White Sox and went 4–10 with a 5.82 ERA, 86 strikeouts, and 38 walks over 103 2/3 innings.

Cannon was optioned to Charlotte to begin the 2026 season. He was recalled by the White Sox for the first time on April 12, but was then placed on the injured list with right hip inflammation two days later. Upon being activated, he was optioned to Charlotte. Cannon appeared in only two games for the White Sox in 2026, and gave up three runs and five walks alongside four strikeouts across three innings. With Charlotte, he pitched in 25 games and had a 5–7 record, a 4.78 ERA, and 121 strikeouts across 122 1/3 innings.
