= Brooks Baldwin =

American baseball player (born 2000)

Chicago White Sox – No. 27
- Infielder
- Born: August 15, 2000 (age 25); Whiteville, North Carolina, U.S.
- Bats: Switch Throws: Right

MLB debut
- July 19, 2024, for the Chicago White Sox

MLB statistics (through 2025 season)
- Batting average: .232
- Home runs: 13
- Runs batted in: 46
- Stats at Baseball Reference

Teams
- Chicago White Sox (2024–2025)

Riley Brooks Baldwin (born August 15, 2000) is an American professional baseball infielder for the Chicago White Sox of Major League Baseball (MLB). He made his MLB debut in 2024.

== Amateur career ==
Baldwin attended Whiteville High School in Whiteville, North Carolina and played college baseball at the University of North Carolina at Wilmington. After his junior season, he was selected by the San Francisco Giants in the 15th round of the 2021 Major League Baseball draft, but did not sign and returned to Wilmington for his senior season. In 2021 and 2022, he played collegiate summer baseball with the Cotuit Kettleers of the Cape Cod Baseball League.

== Professional career ==
Baldwin was drafted by the Chicago White Sox in the 12th round, with the 371st overall selection, of the 2022 Major League Baseball draft and signed. He spent his first professional season with the rookie–level Arizona Complex League White Sox and Single–A Kannapolis Cannon Ballers. Baldwin split 2023 between Kannapolis and the High–A Winston-Salem Dash, slashing .269/.349/.460 with 15 home runs, 58 RBI, and 22 stolen bases over 93 total games.

Baldwin started 2024 with the Double–A Birmingham Barons. In 74 games for Birmingham, he batted .322/.386/.441 with six home runs, 37 RBI, and 16 stolen bases. Baldwin was promoted to the Triple–A Charlotte Knights in July.

On July 19, 2024, Baldwin was promoted to the major leagues for the first time, and made his MLB debut that day. In his first career at bat, Baldwin singled to right field to lead off the third inning against Royals starting pitcher Michael Wacha. This was Baldwin's only hit of the game, as he ended 1-for-3 with one strikeout in the White Sox 7–1 loss. In 33 appearances for Chicago during his rookie campaign, Baldwin batted .211/.250/.316 with two home runs, eight RBI, and four stolen bases.

Baldwin made 103 appearances for the White Sox during the 2025 campaign, slashing .240/.290/.407 with 11 home runs, 38 RBI, and five stolen bases.

On April 7, 2026, it was announced that Baldwin would miss the entirety of the season after undergoing an internal brace procedure to repair his right ulnar collateral ligament.
