= Fraser Ellard =

American baseball player (born 1997)

- Pitcher
- Born: November 6, 1997 (age 28); Roswell, Georgia, U.S.
- Batted: Left Threw: Left

MLB debut
- July 30, 2024, for the Chicago White Sox

Last MLB appearance
- September 26, 2025, for the Chicago White Sox

MLB statistics
- Win–loss record: 3–5
- Earned run average: 3.95
- Strikeouts: 48
- Stats at Baseball Reference

Teams
- Chicago White Sox (2024–2025)

Fraser Ellard (born November 6, 1997) is an American former professional baseball pitcher. He played in Major League Baseball (MLB) for the Chicago White Sox from 2024 to 2025.

== Career ==
Ellard attended King's Ridge Christian School in Alpharetta, Georgia and played college baseball at Truett McConnell University, Lander University and Liberty University.

Ellard was drafted by the Chicago White Sox in the eighth round, with the 245th overall selection, of the 2021 Major League Baseball draft. He spent his first professional season with the rookie–level Arizona Complex League White Sox and Single–A Kannapolis Intimidators, accumulating a 4.43 ERA with 27 strikeouts over 14 games.

Ellard split the 2022 campaign between the High–A Winston-Salem Dash and Double–A Birmingham Barons, compiling a 4.13 ERA with 58 strikeouts and 4 saves across 47 appearances. He split the 2023 season between Birmingham and the rookie–level Arizona Complex League White Sox. In 21 appearances out of the bullpen for the two affiliates, Ellard struggled to a 7.17 ERA with 30 strikeouts and 2 saves across 21 1/3 innings pitched.

Ellard began 2024 with the Triple–A Charlotte Knights, recording a 3.76 ERA with 59 strikeouts over 38 games. On July 30, 2024, Ellard was selected to the 40-man roster and promoted to the major leagues for the first time. He was also the first Lander Bearcat to make Major League Baseball. In 25 appearances for Chicago during his rookie campaign, Ellard compiled a 2-3 record and 3.75 ERA with 26 strikeouts and one save over 24 innings of work.

Ellard made seven appearances for the White Sox to begin the 2025 season, struggling to an 0-2 record and 6.75 ERA with 10 strikeouts. He was placed on the injured list with a left lat strain on May 4, 2025, and was transferred to the 60-day injured list on June 8. Ellard was activated from the injured list on July 4, and was subsequently optioned to Triple-A Charlotte. He was recalled to the majors on September 1, and finished the season with a 4.24 ERA and 22 strikeouts. He retired from baseball on November 18.

== Personal life ==
Ellard married in November 2024.
