= Bullard (disambiguation) =

Bullard is a surname.

Bullard may also refer to:

== Places ==
In the United States

- Bullard, former name of Figarden, California
- Bullard, Georgia
- Bullard Creek, a stream in Minnesota
- Bullard Township, Minnesota
- Bullard, Texas
- Bullard Mountain, in Alaska

== Organizations and institutions ==
- Bullard Independent School District
  - Bullard High School (Bullard, Texas)
- Bullard High School (Fresno, California)
- Bullard Machine Tool Company

== Other uses ==
- USS Bullard (DD-660), a destroyerStamford bull run
- Bullard, a participant in bull running
- Bullards' Song, about the Stamford bull run
