= 2023 San Diego Padres season =

2023 San Diego Padres
- League: National League
- Division: West
- Ballpark: Petco Park
- City: San Diego, California
- Record: 82–80 (.506)
- Divisional place: 3rd
- Owners: Peter Seidler
- General managers: A. J. Preller
- Managers: Bob Melvin
- Television: Bally Sports San Diego (Until May 30); MLB.tv & YurView California (From May 31) (Don Orsillo, Mark Grant, Mike Pomeranz, Mark Sweeney, Jesse Agler)
- Radio: KWFN 97.3 FM (Jesse Agler, Tony Gwynn Jr., Mark Grant); XEMO 860 AM (Spanish) (Eduardo Ortega, Carlos Hernandez, Pedro Gutierrez)

The 2023 San Diego Padres season was the 55th season of the San Diego Padres franchise. The Padres played their home games at Petco Park as members of Major League Baseball's National League West. The Padres had a record of 82–80. The Padres drew an average home attendance of 40,389 in 81 home games in the 2023 MLB season, the 3rd highest in the league.

The Padres were coming off a season in which they made it to the 2022 NLCS and an offseason in which they signed prized free agent Xander Bogaerts to an 11-year deal. Furthermore, the Padres anticipated that their star shortstop and right fielder, Fernando Tatis Jr., would return to the team on April 20 after missing the entire 2022 season due to an injury and an 80-game suspension. Given the Padres' performance in 2022 and their reinforcements for 2023, the 2023 Padres entered the season with high expectations. In fact, several observers, analysts, and pundits predicted that the Padres would win the division over the perennial favorite Los Angeles Dodgers, who had won the NL West in nine of the previous ten seasons. The Padres, however, failed to meet the lofty expectations. They disappointingly hovered around or below a .500 winning percentage for much of the season, and despite a strong September, the Padres missed the playoffs.

On July 22, they beat the Detroit Tigers for their 4,000th win in franchise history. This was the Padres' final season under owner Peter Seidler. Seidler died on November 14 at the age of 63.

== Offseason ==
=== Acquisitions ===
Position	Player	2022 Team
SS	Xander Bogaerts	Boston Red Sox
RP	Drew Carlton	Detroit Tigers
DH	Matt Carpenter	New York Yankees
DH	Nelson Cruz	Washington Nationals
OF	David Dahl	Washington Nationals
OF	Adam Engel	Chicago White Sox
RP	Brent Honeywell Jr.	Oakland Athletics
SP	Seth Lugo	New York Mets
IF	Rougned Odor	Baltimore Orioles
RP	Domingo Tapia	Oakland Athletics
SP	Michael Wacha	Boston Red Sox

=== Departures ===
Position	Player	2023 Team
RP	Austin Adams	Arizona Diamondbacks
C	Jorge Alfaro	Boston Red Sox
OF/1B	Matt Beaty	San Francisco Giants
1B	Josh Bell	Cleveland Guardians
SP	Mike Clevinger	Chicago White Sox
UTL	Brandon Drury	Los Angeles Angels
RP	Pierce Johnson	Colorado Rockies
SP	Sean Manaea	San Francisco Giants
OF	Wil Myers	Cincinnati Reds
LF	Jurickson Profar	Colorado Rockies

=== Rule changes ===
Pursuant to the CBA, new rule changes were put in place for the 2023 season:

- institution of a pitch clock between pitches;
- limits on pickoff attempts per plate appearance;
- limits on defensive shifts requiring two infielders to be on either side of second and be within the boundary of the infield; and
- larger bases (increased to 18-inch squares);

== Regular season ==
=== Game log ===
Legend
	Padres win
	Padres loss
	Postponement
	Eliminated from playoff race
**Bold**	Padres team member

2023 game log: 82–80 (Home: 44–37; Away: 38–43)
March/April: 15–14 (Home: 7–8; Away: 8–6)

#	Date	Opponent	Score	Win	Loss	Save	Attendance	Record	Streak
1	March 30	Rockies	2–7	Márquez (1–0)	**Snell** (0–1)	—	45,103	0–1	L1
2	March 31	Rockies	1–4	Freeland (1–0)	**Martinez** (0–1)	Johnson (1)	43,177	0–2	L2
3	April 1	Rockies	8–4	**Wacha** (1–0)	Ureña (0–1)	—	42,663	1–2	W1
4	April 2	Rockies	3–1	**Lugo** (1–0)	Gomber (0–1)	**Hader** (1)	43,972	2–2	W2
5	April 3	Diamondbacks	5–4	**T. Hill** (1–0)	McGough (0–1)	—	37,602	3–2	W3
6	April 4	Diamondbacks	6–8	Ginkel (1–0)	**García** (0–1)	Jameson (1)	34,542	3–3	L1
7	April 6	@ Braves	6–7	Minter (1–0)	**Crismatt** (0–1)	—	42,803	3–4	L2
8	April 7	@ Braves	5–4	**Honeywell Jr.** (1–0)	Tonkin (0–1)	**Hader** (2)	41,963	4–4	W1
9	April 8	@ Braves	4–1	**Wacha** (2–0)	Morton (1–1)	**Hader** (3)	40,154	5–4	W2
10	April 9	@ Braves	10–2	**Lugo** (2–0)	Dodd (1–1)	—	40,138	6–4	W3
11	April 10	@ Mets	0–5	Scherzer (2–1)	**Darvish** (0–1)	—	30,244	6–5	L1
12	April 11	@ Mets	4–2	**Weathers** (1–0)	Peterson (0–2)	**Hader** (4)	30,769	7–5	W1
13	April 12	@ Mets	2–5	Megill (3–0)	**Snell** (0–2)	Ottavino (1)	34,876	7–6	L1
14	April 13	Brewers	3–4 (10)	Williams (2–0)	**García** (0–2)	Payamps (1)	43,296	7–7	L2
15	April 14	Brewers	2–11	Lauer (2–1)	**Wacha** (2–1)	Wilson (2)	43,822	7–8	L3
16	April 15	Brewers	10–3	**Wilson** (1–0)	Peralta (2–1)	—	42,284	8–8	W1
17	April 16	Brewers	0–1	Miley (2–1)	**Darvish** (0–2)	Williams (2)	43,875	8–9	L1
18	April 17	Braves	0–2	Fried (1–0)	**Weathers** (1–1)	Minter (4)	31,846	8–10	L2
19	April 18	Braves	1–8	Strider (2–0)	**Snell** (0–3)	—	42,693	8–11	L3
20	April 19	Braves	1–0	**Martinez** (1–1)	Morton (2–2)	**Hader** (5)	29,581	9–11	W1
21	April 20	@ Diamondbacks	7–5	**Honeywell Jr.** (2–0)	Nelson (3–1)	**Hader** (6)	16,734	10–11	W2
22	April 21	@ Diamondbacks	0–9	Gallen (3–1)	**Lugo** (2–1)	—	21,308	10–12	L1
23	April 22	@ Diamondbacks	5–3	**Musgrove** (1–0)	Kelly (1–3)	**Hader** (7)	28,419	11–12	W1
24	April 23	@ Diamondbacks	7–5	**Darvish** (1–2)	Jameson (2–1)	**Hader** (8)	23,655	12–12	W2
25	April 25	@ Cubs	0–6	Steele (4–0)	**Snell** (0–4)	—	27,956	12–13	L1
26	April 26	@ Cubs	5–3	**Martinez** (2–1)	Hughes (0–1)	**Hader** (9)	28,955	13–13	W1
27	April 27	@ Cubs	2–5	Wesneski (2–1)	**Lugo** (2–2)	Boxberger (2)	26,588	13–14	L1
28	April 29	Giants*	16–11	**Cosgrove** (1–0)	Rogers (0–1)	—	19,611	14–14	W1
29	April 30	Giants*	6–4	**García** (1–2)	Rogers (0–2)	**Hader** (10)	19,633	15–14	W2
*April 29 and 30 games played in Mexico City, Mexico

May: 10–16 (Home: 5–7; Away: 5–9)

#	Date	Opponent	Score	Win	Loss	Save	Attendance	Record	Streak
30	May 1	Reds	8–3	**Snell** (1–4)	Weaver (0–2)	**Tapia** (1)	37,491	16–14	W3
31	May 2	Reds	1–2 (10)	Law (1–4)	**García** (1–3)	Díaz (5)	43,127	16–15	L1
32	May 3	Reds	7–1	**Lugo** (3–2)	Cessa (1–4)	—	30,531	17–15	W1
33	May 5	Dodgers	5–2	**Darvish** (2–2)	Kershaw (5–2)	**Hader** (11)	45,116	18–15	W2
34	May 6	Dodgers	1–2	May (3–1)	**Snell** (1–5)	Phillips (4)	42,402	18–16	L1
35	May 7	Dodgers	2–5 (10)	Ferguson (2–0)	**Honeywell Jr.** (2–1)	Phillips (5)	43,994	18–17	L2
36	May 9	@ Twins	6–1	**Wacha** (3–1)	Jax (1–4)	—	16,882	19–17	W1
37	May 10	@ Twins	3–4 (11)	Jax (2–4)	**Tapia** (0–1)	—	18,467	19–18	L1
38	May 11	@ Twins	3–5	Pagán (3–0)	**Honeywell Jr.** (2–2)	López (3)	23,365	19–19	L2
39	May 12	@ Dodgers	2–4	Ferguson (3–0)	**T. Hill** (1–1)	Phillips (7)	49,399	19–20	L3
40	May 13	@ Dodgers	2–4	Urías (5–3)	**Musgrove** (1–1)	Ferguson (1)	51,334	19–21	L4
41	May 14	@ Dodgers	0–4	Gonsolin (1–1)	**Weathers** (1–1)	—	46,201	19–22	L5
42	May 15	Royals	4–0	**Wacha** (4–1)	Keller (3–4)	—	43,828	20–22	W1
43	May 16	Royals	4–5	Singer (3–4)	**Lugo** (3–3)	Barlow (5)	36,060	20–23	L1
44	May 17	Royals	3–4	Taylor (1–1)	**Darvish** (2–3)	Barlow (6)	32,416	20–24	L2
45	May 19	Red Sox	1–6	Paxton (1–0)	**Snell** (1–6)	Winckowski (2)	41,530	20–25	L3
46	May 20	Red Sox	2–4	Sale (4–2)	**Musgrove** (1–2)	Jansen (10)	40,215	20–26	L4
47	May 21	Red Sox	7–0	**Wacha** (5–1)	Kluber (2–6)	—	42,825	21–26	W1
48	May 23	@ Nationals	7–4	**Darvish** (3–3)	Ramírez (2–2)	**Hader** (12)	21,438	22–26	W2
49	May 24	@ Nationals	3–5	Williams (2–2)	**Weathers** (1–3)	Finnegan (10)	20,388	22–27	L1
50	May 25	@ Nationals	8–6	**Carlton** (1–0)	Harvey (2–2)	**Hader** (13)	17,524	23–27	W1
51	May 26	@ Yankees	5–1	**Musgrove** (2–2)	Vásquez (0–1)	—	46,724	24–27	W2
52	May 27	@ Yankees	2–3 (10)	Holmes (3–2)	**Martinez** (2–2)	—	46,963	24–28	L1
53	May 28	@ Yankees	7–10	Cole (6–0)	**Darvish** (3–4)	—	47,295	24–29	L2
54	May 30	@ Marlins	9–4	**Martinez** (3–2)	Floro (3–3)	—	11,930	25–29	W1
55	May 31	@ Marlins	1–2	Okert (2–0)	**Hader** (0–1)	—	11,773	25–30	L1

June: 12–15 (Home: 8–7; Away: 4–8)

#	Date	Opponent	Score	Win	Loss	Save	Attendance	Record	Streak
56	June 1	@ Marlins	10–1	**Musgrove** (3–2)	Luzardo (4–4)	—	8,405	26–30	W1
57	June 2	Cubs	1–2	Taillon (1–3)	**Wacha** (5–2)	Leiter Jr. (3)	43,593	26–31	L1
58	June 3	Cubs	6–0	**Darvish** (4–4)	Smyly (5–3)	—	42,655	27–31	W1
59	June 4	Cubs	1–7	Stroman (6–4)	**Weathers** (1–4)	—	44,811	27–32	L1
60	June 5	Cubs	5–0	**Snell** (2–6)	Hendricks (0–2)	—	43,629	28–32	W1
61	June 6	Mariners	1–4	Gilbert (4–3)	**Honeywell Jr.** (2–3)	Sewald (12)	40,395	28–33	L1
62	June 7	Mariners	10–3	**Wacha** (6–2)	Kirby (5–5)	—	35,490	29–33	W1
63	June 9	@ Rockies	9–6	**Darvish** (5–4)	Gomber (4–5)	**Hader** (14)	32,551	30–33	W2
64	June 10	@ Rockies	3–2	**Carlton** (2–0)	Bird (1–1)	**Hader** (15)	37,234	31–33	W3
65	June 11	@ Rockies	4–5	Lawrence (3–3)	**Honeywell Jr.** (2–4)	—	34,724	31–34	L1
66	June 13	Guardians	6–3	**Musgrove** (4–2)	Bibee (2–2)	**Hader** (16)	40,197	32–34	W1
67	June 14	Guardians	5–0	**Wacha** (7–2)	Civale (2–2)	—	43,660	33–34	W2
68	June 15	Guardians	6–8	Stephan (3–2)	**Weathers** (1–5)	Clase (21)	41,864	33–35	L1
69	June 16	Rays	2–6	McClanahan (11–1)	**Darvish** (5–5)	Fairbanks (7)	42,367	33–36	L2
70	June 17	Rays	2–0	**Snell** (3–6)	Eflin (8–3)	**Hader** (17)	43,180	34–36	W1
71	June 18	Rays	5–4	**Musgrove** (5–2)	Chirinos (3–2)	**Hader** (18)	44,404	35–36	W2
72	June 19	@ Giants	4–7 (10)	Doval (2–2)	**Kerr** (0–1)	—	35,376	35–37	L1
73	June 20	@ Giants	3–4	Rogers (2–4)	**Martinez** (3–3)	—	32,060	35–38	L2
74	June 21	@ Giants	2–4	Hjelle (2–1)	**Darvish** (5–6)	Doval (20)	33,332	35–39	L3
75	June 22	@ Giants	10–0	**Snell** (4–6)	Wood (2–2)	—	38,638	36–39	W1
76	June 23	Nationals	13–3	**Musgrove** (6–2)	Corbin (4–9)	—	42,510	37–39	W2
77	June 24	Nationals	0–2	Gray (5–6)	**Waldron** (0–1)	Harvey (5)	43,364	37–40	L1
78	June 25	Nationals	3–8	Gore (4–6)	**Lugo** (3–4)	—	41,503	37–41	L2
79	June 27	@ Pirates	4–9	Hill (7–7)	**Knehr** (0–1)	Contreras (1)	16,539	37–42	L3
80	June 28	@ Pirates	1–7	Keller (9–3)	**Snell** (4–7)	—	14,604	37–43	L4
81	June 29	@ Pirates	4–5	Moreta (4–2)	**T. Hill** (1–2)	Bednar (16)	16,871	37–44	L5
82	June 30	@ Reds	5–7 (11)	Duarte (1–0)	**Carlton** (2–1)	—	31,772	37–45	L6

July: 15–10 (Home: 9–3; Away: 6–7)

#	Date	Opponent	Score	Win	Loss	Save	Attendance	Record	Streak
83	July 1	@ Reds	12–5	**Wacha** (8–2)	Williamson (1–2)	—	30,895	38–45	W1
84	July 2	@ Reds	3–4	Sims (2–1)	**Cosgrove** (1–1)	Díaz (23)	37,714	38–46	L1
85	July 3	Angels	10–3	**Snell** (5–7)	Barría (2–4)	—	45,101	39–46	W1
86	July 4	Angels	8–5	**Musgrove** (7–2)	Ohtani (7–4)	**Hader** (19)	44,725	40–46	W2
87	July 5	Angels	5–3	**Martinez** (4–3)	Webb (1–1)	**Hader** (20)	43,401	41–46	W3
88	July 7	Mets	5–7 (10)	Smith (4–3)	**Cosgrove** (1–2)	—	42,712	41–47	L1
89	July 8	Mets	3–1	**Snell** (6–7)	Peterson (2–7)	**Hader** (21)	42,647	42–47	W1
90	July 9	Mets	6–2	**Musgrove** (8–2)	Scherzer (8–3)	—	42,745	43–47	W2
**93rd All-Star Game in Seattle, WA**
91	July 14	@ Phillies	8–3	**Darvish** (6–6)	Sánchez (0–3)	**Hader** (22)	44,028	44–47	W3
92	July 15 (1)	@ Phillies	4–6	Strahm (6–3)	**T. Hill** (1–3)	Kimbrel (15)	43,712	44–48	L1
93	July 15 (2)	@ Phillies	4–9	Walker (11–3)	**Weathers** (1–6)	—	33,132	44–49	L2
94	July 16	@ Phillies	6–7 (12)	Hoffman (3–1)	**T. Hill** (1–4)	—	37,204	44–50	L3
95	July 18	@ Blue Jays	9–1	**Musgrove** (9–2)	Manoah (2–8)	—	42,680	45–50	W1
96	July 19	@ Blue Jays	2–0	**Darvish** (7–6)	Berríos (8–7)	**Hader** (23)	42,948	46–50	W2
97	July 20	@ Blue Jays	0–4	Bassitt (10–5)	**Snell** (6–8)	—	43,196	46–51	L1
98	July 21	@ Tigers	5–4	**Lugo** (4–4)	Olson (1–4)	**Hader** (24)	28,834	47–51	W1
99	July 22	@ Tigers	14–3	**Wolf** (1–0)	Englert (4–3)	—	31,974	48–51	W2
100	July 23	@ Tigers	1–3	Faedo (2–4)	**Musgrove** (9–3)	Lange (17)	24,523	48–52	L1
101	July 24	Pirates	4–8	Priester (1–1)	**Darvish** (7–7)	—	43,419	48–53	L2
102	July 25	Pirates	5–1	**Snell** (7–8)	Hill (7–10)	—	43,448	49–53	W1
103	July 26	Pirates	2–3	Oviedo (4–11)	**Lugo** (4–5)	Bednar (20)	41,394	49–54	L1
104	July 28	Rangers	7–1	**Musgrove** (10–3)	Dunning (8–4)	—	44,241	50–54	W1
105	July 29	Rangers	4–0	**Darvish** (8–7)	Pérez (8–4)	—	42,677	51–54	W2
106	July 30	Rangers	5–3	**Snell** (8–8)	Leclerc (0–2)	**Hader** (25)	42,943	52–54	W3
107	July 31	@ Rockies	3–4 (10)	Hand (3–1)	**Martinez** (4–4)	—	25,582	52–55	L1

August: 10–18 (Home: 6–9; Away: 4–9)

#	Date	Opponent	Score	Win	Loss	Save	Attendance	Record	Streak
108	August 1	@ Rockies	8–5	**Suárez** (1–0)	Lambert (2–2)	**Hader** (26)	27,417	53–55	W1
109	August 2	@ Rockies	11–1	**Kerr** (1–1)	Freeland (4–12)	—	28,437	54–55	W2
110	August 4	Dodgers	5–10	Brasier (3–0)	**Suárez** (1–1)	Phillips (14)	42,930	54–56	L1
111	August 5	Dodgers	8–3	**Martinez** (5–4)	Almonte (3–2)	—	42,567	55–56	W1
112	August 6	Dodgers	2–8	Lynn (8–9)	**R. Hill** (7–11)	—	43,306	55–57	L1
113	August 7	Dodgers	7–13	Gonsolin (7–4)	**Lugo** (4–6)	—	44,455	55–58	L2
114	August 8	@ Mariners	0–2	Gilbert (10–5)	**Barlow** (2–5)	Muñoz (6)	40,231	55–59	L3
115	August 9	@ Mariners	1–6	Brash (8–3)	**Wilson** (1–1)	—	39,546	55–60	L4
116	August 11	@ Diamondbacks	10–5	**Snell** (9–8)	Nelson (6–7)	—	26,210	56–60	W1
117	August 12	@ Diamondbacks	0–3	Gallen (12–5)	**R. Hill** (7–12)	Sewald (22)	41,351	56–61	L1
118	August 13	@ Diamondbacks	4–5	Nelson (6–3)	**Suárez** (1–2)	Sewald (23)	29,277	56–62	L2
119	August 14	Orioles	1–4	Rodriguez (3–3)	**Darvish** (8–8)	Bautista (32)	38,176	56–63	L3
120	August 15	Orioles	10–3	**Wacha** (9–2)	Flaherty (8–8)	—	35,604	57–63	W1
121	August 16	Orioles	5–2	**Snell** (10–8)	Kremer (11–5)	**Hader** (27)	42,318	58–63	W2
122	August 17	Diamondbacks	1–3	Gallen (13–5)	**R. Hill** (7–13)	Martinez (1)	38,020	58–64	L1
123	August 18	Diamondbacks	4–0	**Suárez** (2–2)	Castro (5–6)	—	40,945	59–64	W1
124	August 19 (1)	Diamondbacks	4–6	Kelly (10–5)	**Waldron** (0–2)	Sewald (26)	34,220	59–65	L1
125	August 19 (1)	Diamondbacks	1–8	Jarvis (1–0)	**Darvish** (8–9)	—	41,074	59–66	L2
—	August 20	Diamondbacks	Rescheduled due to Hurricane Hilary;Moved to August 19						
126	August 21	Marlins	6–2	**Wacha** (10–2)	Weathers (1–8)	—	32,192	60–66	W1
127	August 22	Marlins	0–3	Luzardo (9–8)	**Snell** (10–9)	Robertson (18)	43,430	60–67	L1
128	August 23	Marlins	4–0	**Lugo** (5–6)	Alcántara (6–11)	—	33,640	61–67	W1
129	August 25	@ Brewers	3–7	Woodruff (3–1)	**Darvish** (8–10)	—	33,089	61–68	L1
130	August 26	@ Brewers	4–5	Peralta (11–8)	**Ávila** (0–1)	Williams (31)	39,945	61–69	L2
131	August 27	@ Brewers	6–10	Wilson (6–0)	**Wilson** (1–2)	—	36,528	61–70	L3
132	August 28	@ Cardinals	4–1	**Snell** (11–9)	Wainwright (3–10)	**Hader** (28)	35,917	62–70	W1
133	August 29	@ Cardinals	5–6 (10)	Romero (4–1)	**Hader** (0–2)	—	36,851	62–71	L1
134	August 30	@ Cardinals	4–5	Pallante (4–1)	**Hader** (0–3)	—	32,583	62–72	L2
135	August 31	Giants	2–7	Manaea (5–5)	**Ávila** (0–2)	—	36,639	62–73	L3

September/October: 20–7 (Home: 9–3; Away: 11–4)

#	Date	Opponent	Score	Win	Loss	Save	Attendance	Record	Streak
136	September 1	Giants	7–3	**Wacha** (11–2)	Beck (3–3)	—	40,326	63–73	W1
137	September 2	Giants	6–1	**Snell** (12–9)	Harrison (1–1)	—	41,983	64–73	W2
138	September 3	Giants	4–0	**Lugo** (6–6)	Cobb (7–6)	—	41,050	65–73	W3
139	September 4	Phillies	7–9	Walker (15–5)	**R. Hill** (7–14)	Alvarado (7)	39,719	65–74	L1
140	September 5	Phillies	8–0	**Ávila** (1–2)	Lorenzen (8–9)	—	42,970	66–74	W1
141	September 6	Phillies	1–5	Wheeler (11–6)	**Wacha** (11–3)	—	34,317	66–75	L1
142	September 8	@ Astros	11–2	**Snell** (13–9)	Brown (10–11)	—	39,516	67–75	W1
143	September 9	@ Astros	5–7	Maton (4–3)	**Lugo** (6–7)	Pressly (30)	39,452	67–76	L1
144	September 10	@ Astros	2–12	France (11–5)	**Waldron** (0–3)	—	41,073	67–77	L2
145	September 11	@ Dodgers	11–8	**Suárez** (3–2)	Phillips (1–4)	—	40,072	68–77	W1
146	September 12	@ Dodgers	2–11	Lynn (11–11)	**Wacha** (11–4)	—	42,194	68–78	L1
147	September 13	@ Dodgers	6–1	**Snell** (14–9)	Pepiot (2–1)	—	41,810	69–78	W1
148	September 15	@ Athletics	8–3	**Lugo** (7–7)	Newcomb (1–1)	—	17,828	70–78	W2
149	September 16	@ Athletics	5–2	**Waldron** (1–3)	Miller (0–3)	**Hader** (29)	14,876	71–78	W3
150	September 17	@ Athletics	10–1	**Ávila** (2–2)	Waldichuk (3–8)	—	8,680	72–78	W4
151	September 18	Rockies	11–9	**Wacha** (12–4)	Blach (3–2)	**Hader** (30)	42,062	73–78	W5
152	September 19	Rockies	2–0	**Hader** (1–3)	Kinley (0–3)	—	39,809	74–78	W6
153	September 20	Rockies	3–2	**García** (2–3)	Anderson (0–6)	**Hader** (31)	35,479	75–78	W7
154	September 22	Cardinals	4–2	**Suárez** (4–2)	Liberatore (3–6)	—	42,983	76–78	W8
155	September 23	Cardinals	2–5 (11)	Lawrence (1–0)	**Barlow** (2–6)	—	42,525	76–79	L1
156	September 24	Cardinals	12–2	**Wacha** (13–4)	Rom (1–4)	—	42,505	77–79	W1
157	September 25	@ Giants	1–2	Webb (11–13)	**Suárez** (4–3)	—	28,557	77–80	L1
158	September 26	@ Giants	4–0	**Lugo** (8–7)	Brebbia (3–3)	**Hader** (32)	28,183	78–80	W1
159	September 27	@ Giants	5–2 (10)	**Hader** (2–3)	Brebbia (3–4)	**Cosgrove** (1)	32,151	79–80	W2
160	September 29	@ White Sox	3–2	**Martinez** (6–4)	Cease (7–9)	**Hader** (33)	20,491	80–80	W3
161	September 30	@ White Sox	6–1	**Wacha** (14–4)	Clevinger (9–9)	—	30,118	81–80	W4
162	October 1	@ White Sox	2–1 (11)	**R. Hill** (8–14)	Cronin (0–1)	—	20,588	82–80	W5

== Season standings ==
=== National League West ===
NL West
Team	W	L	Pct.	GB	Home	Road
Los Angeles Dodgers	100	62	.617	—	53‍–‍28	47‍–‍34
Arizona Diamondbacks	84	78	.519	16	43‍–‍38	41‍–‍40
San Diego Padres	82	80	.506	18	44‍–‍37	38‍–‍43
San Francisco Giants	79	83	.488	21	45‍–‍36	34‍–‍47
Colorado Rockies	59	103	.364	41	37‍–‍44	22‍–‍59

=== National League Wild Card ===
Division leaders
Team	W	L	Pct.
Atlanta Braves	104	58	.642
Los Angeles Dodgers	100	62	.617
Milwaukee Brewers	92	70	.568

Wild Card teams (Top 3 teams qualify for postseason)
Team	W	L	Pct.	GB
Philadelphia Phillies	90	72	.556	+6
Miami Marlins	84	78	.519	—
Arizona Diamondbacks	84	78	.519	—
Chicago Cubs	83	79	.512	1
San Diego Padres	82	80	.506	2
Cincinnati Reds	82	80	.506	2
San Francisco Giants	79	83	.488	5
Pittsburgh Pirates	76	86	.469	8
New York Mets	75	87	.463	9
St. Louis Cardinals	71	91	.438	13
Washington Nationals	71	91	.438	13
Colorado Rockies	59	103	.364	25

=== Record vs. opponents ===
==== Record vs. National League ====
2023 National League record Source: MLB Standings Grid – 2023
Team	AZ	ATL	CHC	CIN	COL	LAD	MIA	MIL	NYM	PHI	PIT	SD	SF	STL	WSH	AL
Arizona	—	3–3	6–1	3–4	10–3	5–8	2–4	4–2	1–6	3–4	4–2	7–6	7–6	3–3	5–1	21–25
Atlanta	3–3	—	4–2	5–1	7–0	4–3	9–4	5–1	10–3	8–5	4–3	3–4	4–2	4–2	8–5	26–20
Chicago	1–6	2–4	—	6–7	4–2	3–4	2–4	6–7	3–3	1–5	10–3	4–3	5–1	8–5	3–4	25–21
Cincinnati	4–3	1–5	7–6	—	4–2	4–2	3–3	3–10	4–2	3–4	5–8	3–3	3–4	6–7	4–3	28–18
Colorado	3–10	0–7	2–4	2–4	—	3–10	5–2	4–2	4–2	2–5	2–4	4–9	4–9	3–3	3–4	18–28
Los Angeles	8–5	3–4	4–3	2–4	10–3	—	3–3	5–1	3–3	4–2	4–3	9–4	7–6	4–3	4–2	30–16
Miami	4–2	4–9	4–2	3–3	2–5	3–3	—	3–4	4–8	7–6	5–2	2–4	3–3	3–4	11–2	26–20
Milwaukee	2–4	1–5	7–6	10–3	2–4	1–5	4–3	—	6–1	4–2	8–5	6–1	2–5	8–5	3–3	28–18
New York	6–1	3–10	3–3	2–4	2–4	3–3	8–4	1–6	—	6–7	3–3	3–3	4–3	4–3	7–6	19–27
Philadelphia	4–3	5–8	5–1	4–3	5–2	2–4	6–7	2–4	7–6	—	3–3	5–2	2–4	5–1	7–6	28–18
Pittsburgh	2–4	3–4	3–10	8–5	4–2	3–4	2–5	5–8	3–3	3–3	—	5–1	2–4	9–4	5–2	19–27
San Diego	6–7	4–3	3–4	3–3	9–4	4–9	4–2	1–6	3–3	2–5	1–5	—	8–5	3–3	3–3	28–18
San Francisco	6–7	2–4	1–5	4–3	9–4	6–7	3–3	5–2	3–4	4–2	4–2	5–8	—	6–1	1–5	20–26
St. Louis	3–3	2–4	5–8	7–6	3–3	3–4	4–3	5–8	3–4	1–5	4–9	3–3	1–6	—	4–2	23–23
Washington	1–5	5–8	4–3	3–4	4–3	2–4	2–11	3–3	6–7	6–7	2–5	3–3	5–1	2–4	—	23–23

Updated with the results of all games through October 1, 2023.

==== Record vs. American League ====
2023 National League record vs. American League Source: MLB Standings
Team	BAL	BOS	CWS	CLE	DET	HOU	KC	LAA	MIN	NYY	OAK	SEA	TB	TEX	TOR
Arizona	1–2	1–2	2–1	2–1	3–0	0–3	2–1	2–1	0–3	1–2	2–1	1–2	1–2	3–1	0–3
Atlanta	2–1	1–3	1–2	2–1	2–1	0–3	3–0	2–1	3–0	3–0	1–2	2–1	2–1	2–1	0–3
Chicago	2–1	1–2	3–1	1–2	2–1	0–3	2–1	0–3	1–2	2–1	3–0	2–1	2–1	2–1	2–1
Cincinnati	2–1	2–1	1–2	2–2	2–1	3–0	3–0	3–0	1–2	0–3	2–1	2–1	1–2	3–0	1–2
Colorado	1–2	2–1	2–1	2–1	1–2	1–3	2–1	2–1	1–2	2–1	1–2	0–3	0–3	0–3	1–2
Los Angeles	2–1	2–1	2–1	2–1	2–1	2–1	1–2	4–0	2–1	1–2	3–0	3–0	1–2	2–1	1–2
Miami	0–3	3–0	2–1	2–1	2–1	1–2	3–0	3–0	2–1	2–1	3–0	1–2	1–3	0–3	1–2
Milwaukee	2–1	1–2	3–0	2–1	1–2	2–1	3–0	2–1	2–2	2–1	0–3	3–0	1–2	3–0	1–2
New York	0–3	1–2	2–1	3–0	0–3	1–2	0–3	1–2	1–2	2–2	3–0	2–1	2–1	1–2	0–3
Philadelphia	2–1	1–2	2–1	1–2	3–0	2–1	2–1	2–1	1–2	1–2	3–0	2–1	3–0	0–3	3–1
Pittsburgh	1–2	3–0	2–1	1–2	2–2	1–2	3–0	1–2	1–2	1–2	1–2	1–2	0–3	1–2	0–3
San Diego	2–1	1–2	3–0	2–1	2–1	1–2	1–2	3–0	1–2	1–2	3–0	1–3	2–1	3–0	2–1
San Francisco	1–2	2–1	2–1	2–1	0–3	2–1	1–2	1–2	2–1	1–2	2–2	1–2	1–2	1–2	1–2
St. Louis	2–1	3–0	2–1	1–2	1–2	1–2	2–2	0–3	1–2	2–1	2–1	1–2	2–1	1–2	2–1
Washington	0–4	2–1	2–1	1–2	2–1	1–2	2–1	1–2	2–1	2–1	3–0	2–1	0–3	2–1	1–2

Updated with the results of all games through October 1, 2023.

== Roster ==
2023 San Diego Padres
Roster
Pitchers: 60 Pedro Ávila; 58 Scott Barlow; 73 Drew Carlton; 65 José Castillo; 59 Tom Cosgrove; 74 Nabil Crismatt; 11 Yu Darvish; 40 José Espada; 66 Luis García; 71 Josh Hader; 48 Nick Hernandez; 41 Rich Hill; 25 Tim Hill; 45 Brent Honeywell Jr.; 58 Alek Jacob; 56 Ray Kerr; 33 Reiss Knehr; 67 Seth Lugo; 21 Nick Martinez; 50 Adrián Morejón; 44 Joe Musgrove; 4 Blake Snell; 75 Robert Suárez; 76 Domingo Tapia; 52 Michael Wacha; 61 Matt Waldron; 40 Ryan Weathers; 36 Steven Wilson; 43 Jackson Wolf	Catchers: 12 Luis Campusano; 26 Austin Nola; 99 Gary Sánchez; 29 Brett Sullivan; Infielders: 17 Matthew Batten; 2 Xander Bogaerts; 14 Matt Carpenter; 91 Ji-man Choi; 24 Garrett Cooper; 9 Jake Cronenworth; 32 Nelson Cruz; 16 Brandon Dixon; 7 Ha-seong Kim; 13 Manny Machado; 24 Rougned Odor; 30 Alfonso Rivas; 5 Eguy Rosario	Outfielders: 28 José Azócar; 27 David Dahl; 5 Adam Engel; 16 Ben Gamel; 1 Trent Grisham; 38 Taylor Kohlwey; 10 Jurickson Profar; 22 Juan Soto; 23 Fernando Tatís Jr.; Other batters: 45 Chandler Seagle	Manager: 3 Bob Melvin; Coaches: 86 Heberto Andrade (bullpen catcher/coaching assistant); 20 Ryan Christenson (associate manager); 47 Scott Coolbaugh (assistant hitting); 85 Oscar Bernard (assistant hitting); 82 Brian Esposito (catching); 84 Ryan Flaherty (bench/offensive coordinator); 53 Ben Fritz (bullpen); 46 David Macias (first base/outfield instructor); 57 Ruben Niebla (pitching); 38 Bryan Price (senior advisor to major league coaching staff); 8 Mike Shildt (senior advisor to player development & major leagues); 83 Peter Summerville (game planning/coaching assistant); 18 Matt Williams (third base/infield instructor)

== Player statistics ==
= Indicates team leader

= Indicates league leader

=== Batting ===
Note: G = Games played; AB = At bats; R = Runs; H = Hits; 2B = Doubles; 3B = Triples; HR = Home runs; RBI = Runs batted in; SB = Stolen bases; BB = Walks; AVG = Batting average; SLG = Slugging average

Player	G	AB	R	H	2B	3B	HR	RBI	SB	BB	AVG	SLG
Xander Bogaerts	155	596	83	170	31	2	19	58	19	56	.285	.440
Fernando Tatís Jr.	141	575	91	148	33	1	25	78	29	53	.257	.449
Juan Soto	162	568	97	156	32	1	35	109	12	132	.275	.519
Manny Machado	138	543	75	140	21	0	30	91	3	50	.258	.462
Ha-seong Kim	152	538	84	140	23	0	17	60	38	75	.260	.398
Trent Grisham	153	469	67	93	31	1	13	50	15	75	.198	.352
Jake Cronenworth	127	458	54	105	24	7	10	48	6	46	.229	.378
Gary Sánchez	72	234	33	51	9	0	19	46	0	21	.218	.500
Matt Carpenter	76	188	18	33	12	0	5	31	1	41	.176	.319
Luis Campusano	49	163	27	52	7	0	7	30	0	7	.319	.491
Nelson Cruz	49	143	9	35	5	1	5	23	1	6	.245	.399
Rougned Odor	59	138	21	28	9	0	4	18	2	17	.203	.355
Austin Nola	52	130	9	19	3	0	1	8	0	18	.146	.192
Matthew Batten	43	120	19	31	6	0	2	11	2	17	.258	.358
Garrett Cooper	41	117	14	28	7	0	4	15	0	14	.239	.402
José Azócar	55	91	16	21	6	0	2	9	8	4	.231	.363
Brett Sullivan	33	81	7	17	3	0	1	6	0	4	.210	.284
Brandon Dixon	33	79	10	16	4	0	2	9	1	1	.203	.329
Jurickson Profar	14	44	4	13	2	0	1	7	0	5	.295	.409
Eguy Rosario	11	36	6	9	1	1	2	6	0	1	.250	.500
Ji-man Choi	16	31	3	2	1	0	0	2	0	8	.065	.097
Alfonso Rivas	8	15	2	3	2	0	0	1	0	2	.200	.333
Ben Gamel	6	15	2	3	1	0	0	2	0	0	.200	.267
Taylor Kohlwey	5	13	0	2	0	0	0	0	0	0	.154	.154
David Dahl	4	9	1	1	0	0	1	1	0	0	.111	.444
Adam Engel	5	6	0	0	0	0	0	0	0	0	.000	.000
Chandler Seagle	1	1	0	0	0	0	0	0	0	0	.000	.000
Totals	162	5401	752	1316	273	14	205	719	137	653	.244	.413
Rank in NL	—	13	6	11	8	13	6	6	5	1	11	7

Source:Baseball Reference

=== Pitching ===
Note: W = Wins; L = Losses; ERA = Earned run average; G = Games pitched; GS = Games started; SV = Saves; IP = Innings pitched; H = Hits allowed; R = Runs allowed; ER = Earned runs allowed; BB = Walks allowed; SO = Strikeouts

Player	W	L	ERA	G	GS	SV	IP	H	R	ER	BB	SO
Blake Snell	14	9	2.25	32	32	0	180.0	115	47	45	99	234
Seth Lugo	8	7	3.57	26	26	0	146.1	140	62	58	36	140
Yu Darvish	8	10	4.56	24	24	0	136.1	134	71	69	43	141
Michael Wacha	14	4	3.22	24	24	0	134.1	113	49	48	43	124
Nick Martinez	6	4	3.43	63	9	1	110.1	99	45	42	40	106
Joe Musgrove	10	3	3.05	17	17	0	97.1	90	35	33	21	97
Luis García	2	3	4.07	61	0	0	59.2	59	30	27	24	53
Josh Hader	2	3	1.28	61	0	33	56.1	32	11	8	30	85
Steven Wilson	1	2	3.91	52	0	0	53.0	35	23	23	27	57
Tom Cosgrove	1	2	1.75	54	0	1	51.1	31	12	10	19	44
Pedro Ávila	2	2	3.22	14	6	0	50.1	43	23	18	25	54
Brent Honeywell Jr.	2	4	4.05	36	0	0	46.2	44	22	21	20	42
Ryan Weathers	1	6	6.25	12	10	0	44.2	55	33	31	17	29
Tim Hill	1	4	5.48	48	0	0	44.1	59	36	27	14	26
Matt Waldron	1	3	4.35	8	6	0	41.1	39	20	20	12	31
Scott Barlow	0	2	3.07	25	0	0	29.1	23	13	10	12	32
Robert Suárez	4	3	4.23	26	0	0	27.2	15	13	13	10	24
Rich Hill	1	4	8.23	10	5	0	27.1	36	28	25	11	25
Ray Kerr	1	1	4.33	22	0	0	27.0	25	15	13	9	35
Drew Carlton	2	1	4.35	11	0	0	20.2	18	12	10	6	18
Domingo Tapia	0	1	3.57	15	0	1	17.2	13	8	7	12	14
Nabil Crismatt	0	1	9.82	7	0	0	11.0	17	12	12	7	9
Adrián Morejón	0	0	7.00	8	1	0	9.0	14	7	7	5	8
Reiss Knehr	0	1	15.88	4	1	0	5.2	10	10	10	5	4
Jackson Wolf	1	0	5.40	1	1	0	5.0	6	3	3	1	1
Alek Jacob	0	0	0.00	3	0	0	3.0	0	0	0	1	5
Nick Hernandez	0	0	12.00	2	0	0	3.0	3	4	4	4	5
Brandon Dixon	0	0	0.00	1	0	0	1.0	0	0	0	0	0
José Espada	0	0	0.00	1	0	0	1.0	0	0	0	2	2
José Castillo	0	0	108.00	1	0	0	0.1	2	4	4	2	0
Totals	82	80	3.73	162	162	36	1441.0	1270	648	598	557	1445
Rank in NL	8	7	2	—	—	11	4	2	2	2	10	4

Source:Baseball Reference

== Farm system ==
Level	Team	League	Manager	W	L	Position
Triple-A	El Paso Chihuahuas	Pacific Coast League	Phillip Wellman	61	85	4th East
Double-A	San Antonio Missions	Texas League	Luke Montz	70	68	2nd South
High-A	Fort Wayne TinCaps	Midwest League	Jon Mathews	69	63	3rd East
Low-A	Lake Elsinore Storm	California League	Pete Zamora	63	66	3rd South
Rookie	ACL Padres	Arizona Complex League	Lukas Ray	30	36	4th West
Rookie	DSL Padres Gold	Dominican Summer League	Diego Cedeno	37	17	1st Baseball City
Rookie	DSL Padres Brown	Dominican Summer League	Luis Mendez	16	38	8th Baseball City
