= Nick Rumbelow =

American baseball player (born 1991)

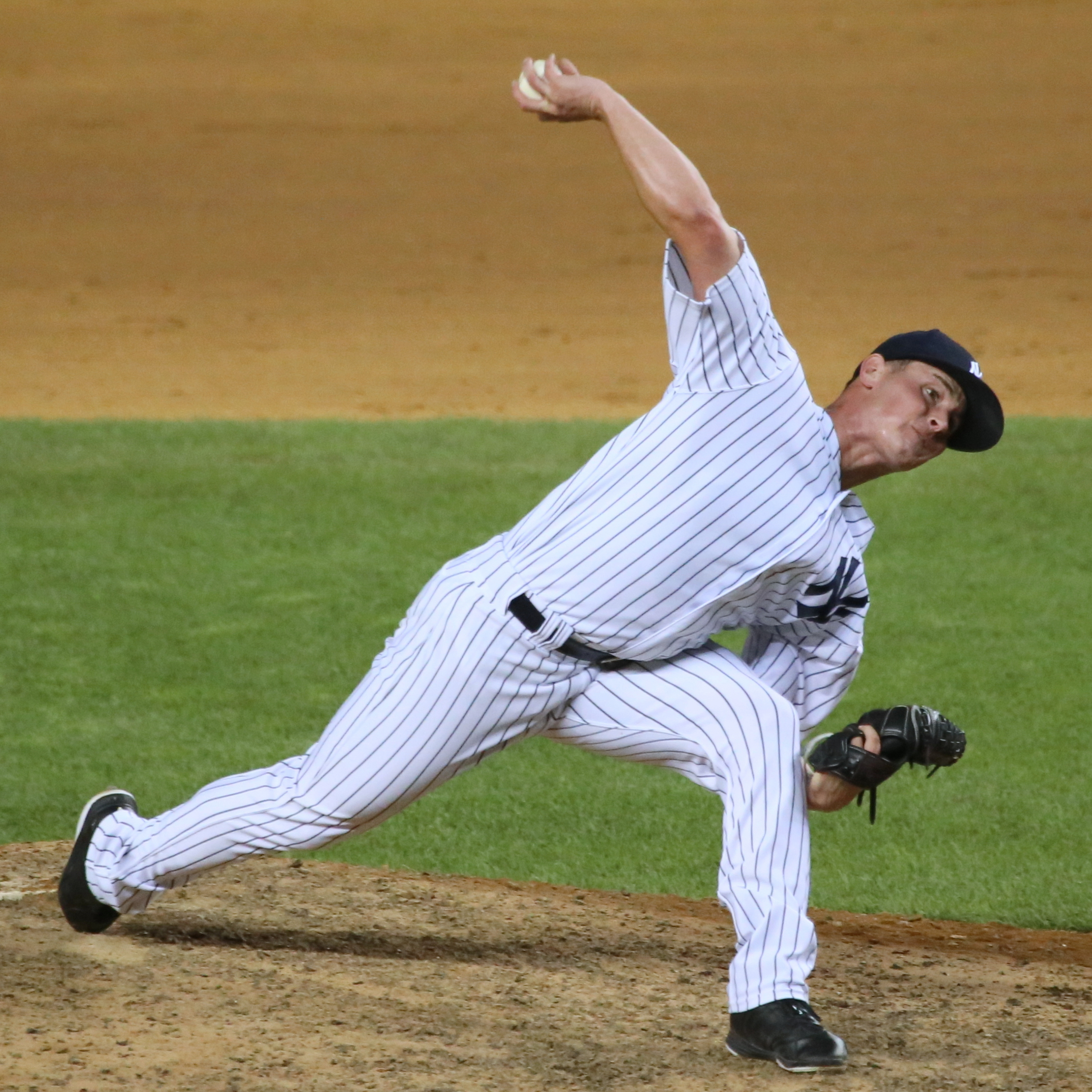
- Rumbelow pitching for the Yankees
- Pitcher
- Born: September 6, 1991 (age 35); Bullard, Texas, U.S.
- Batted: Right Threw: Right

MLB debut
- June 23, 2015, for the New York Yankees

Last MLB appearance
- March 31, 2019, for the Seattle Mariners

MLB statistics
- Win–loss record: 1–1
- Earned run average: 5.97
- Strikeouts: 33
- Stats at Baseball Reference

Teams
- New York Yankees (2015); Seattle Mariners (2018–2019)

Nicholas Bruno Rumbelow (born September 6, 1991) is an American former professional baseball pitcher. He made his Major League Baseball (MLB) debut in 2015 with the New York Yankees and also pitched for the Seattle Mariners.

== Career ==
=== Amateur ===
Rumbelow attended Bullard High School in Bullard, Texas where, as a senior, he recorded an earned run average (ERA) of 0.52 with 11 wins and a batting average of .422 with 29 runs batted in. Rumbelow was named to the Tyler Morning Telegraph's all-East Texas team as a senior in 2010.

After high school, Rumbelow chose to play college baseball at Louisiana State University (LSU) for the LSU Tigers over competing opportunities at Rice, Oregon State, Clemson, Florida and Baylor. In three seasons from 2011 to 2013, Rumbelow appeared in 70 games and had a 3–0 win–loss record and 3.68 ERA. In 2012, he played collegiate summer baseball with the Wareham Gatemen of the Cape Cod Baseball League, where he was named a league all-star. He was drafted by the New York Yankees in the seventh round of the 2013 Major League Baseball draft.

=== New York Yankees ===
Rumbelow made his professional debut with the Staten Island Yankees of the Class A-Short Season New York-Penn League. He started 2014 with the Charleston RiverDogs of the Class A South Atlantic League and was promoted to the Tampa Yankees of the Class A-Advanced Florida State League, Trenton Thunder of the Double-A Eastern League, and Scranton/Wilkes-Barre RailRiders of the Triple-A International League during the season. In total for the season, he was 5–2 with a 2.62 ERA and eight saves in 42 games consisting of 58 1/3 innings pitched.

Rumbelow was a non-roster invitee to spring training in 2015. After starting the season with Scranton/Wilkes-Barre, Rumbelow was promoted to the major leagues on June 22. He made his major league debut the next day, allowing one run in a blowout loss to the Philadelphia Phillies. He appeared in four games and was optioned to Scranton/Wilkes-Barre on July 8. Rumbelow received several promotions to the major leagues and demotions to Scranton/Wilkes-Barre. He compiled a 1–1 record and 4.02 ERA in 15 2/3 innings pitched for the Yankees in 2015.

Rumbelow began the 2016 season with Scranton/Wilkes-Barre. He injured his elbow during his first game of the season. The team announced that Rumbelow would undergo Tommy John surgery, forcing him to miss the remainder of the 2016 season. Rumbelow was designated for assignment by the Yankees after the 2016 season and released to days later. He re-signed with the Yankees in January 2017 to rehab the injury. Rumbelow returned to Double-A in June and was back in Scranton by July 2017. He pitched to a 5–1 record with a 1.12 ERA in 17 games. The Yankees re-added Rumbelow to their 40-man roster after the end of the season.

=== Seattle Mariners ===
After the 2017 season, the Yankees traded Rumbelow to the Seattle Mariners for Juan Then and JP Sears. Rumbelow suffered a brachial plexus injury in the beginning of spring training in 2018 and was on the disabled list until June. He was activated from the disabled list on June 5 and assigned to the Tacoma Rainiers of the Triple-A Pacific Coast League, where he pitched in three games before the Mariners promoted him to the major leagues on June 14. He pitched to a 6.11 ERA in 17.2 innings bouncing between the Triple-A and the majors that year.

In 2019, Rumbelow was included on the Mariners opening day roster. He was optioned to the minors on April 2 after allowing four runs in 1.2 innings of work. He was designated for assignment on May 17, 2019, and outrighted on May 22. He was released by the Mariners organization on June 12.

=== Sugar Land Skeeters ===
On June 25, 2019, Rumbelow signed with the Sugar Land Skeeters of the Atlantic League of Professional Baseball. He pitched in 21 games and threw 22 1/3 innings going 3-0 with a 0.81 era and 31 strikeouts.

=== New York Mets ===
On August 19, 2019, the New York Mets selected Rumbelow's contract. He was among the first cuts in spring training before the 2020 season. Following the cancellation of minor league season during the COVID-19 pandemic, Rumbelow was released on May 28, 2020.

=== Sugar Land Skeeters (second stint) ===
Rumbelow signed on to play for the Sugar Land Skeeters of the Constellation Energy League (a makeshift 4-team independent league created as a result of the COVID-19 pandemic) for the 2020 season.
