= Bullard High School =

Bullard High School may refer to:

- Bullard High School (Fresno, California), in the Fresno Unified School District
- Bullard High School (Bullard, Texas), in the Bullard Independent School District
