= Michael Wacha =

American baseball player (born 1991)

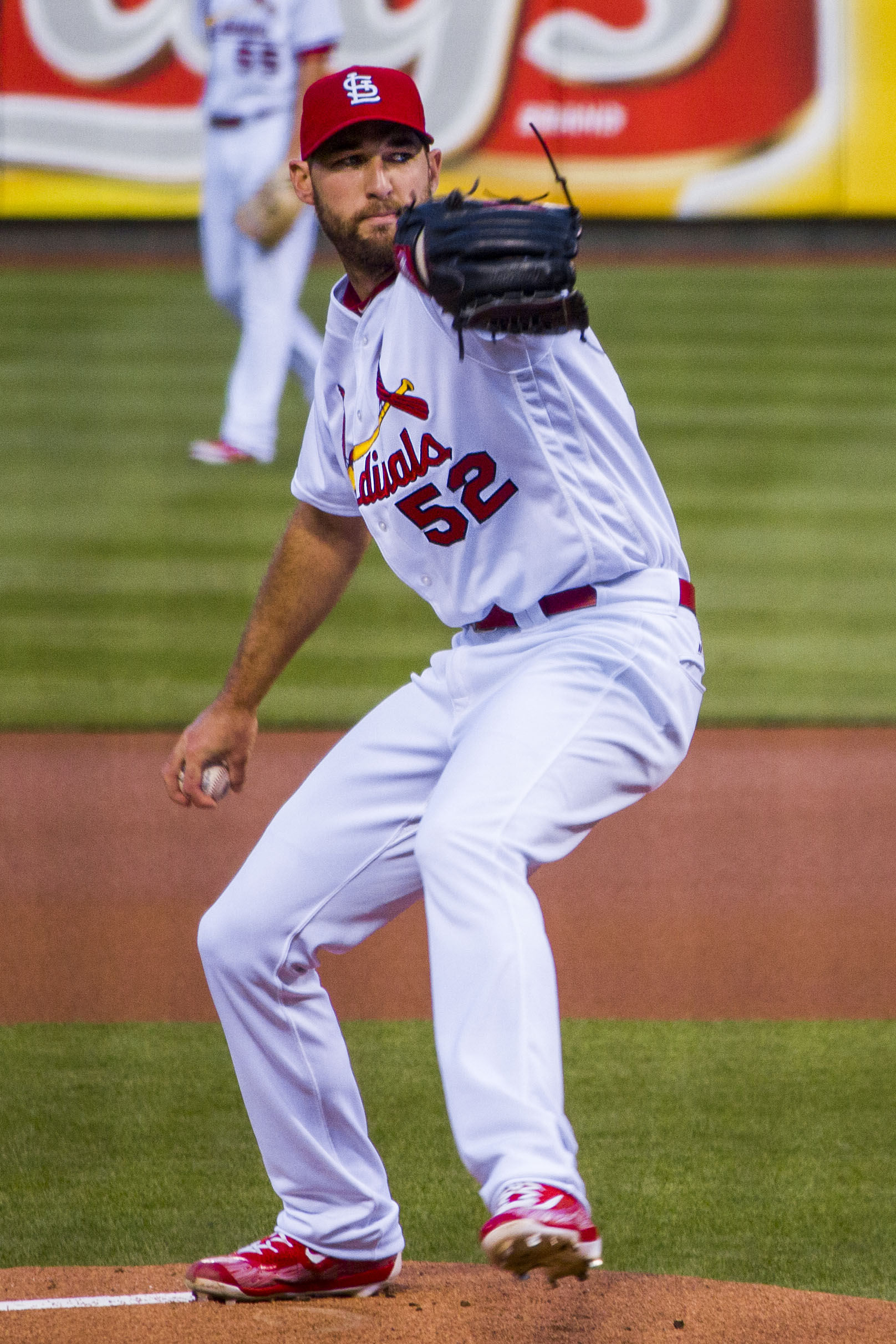
- Wacha with the St. Louis Cardinals in 2017

Kansas City Royals – No. 52
- Pitcher
- Born: July 1, 1991 (age 35); Iowa City, Iowa, U.S.
- Bats: Right Throws: Right

MLB debut
- May 30, 2013, for the St. Louis Cardinals

MLB statistics (through 2026 season)
- Win–loss record: 120–85
- Earned run average: 3.83
- Strikeouts: 1,574
- Stats at Baseball Reference

Teams
- St. Louis Cardinals (2013–2019); New York Mets (2020); Tampa Bay Rays (2021); Boston Red Sox (2022); San Diego Padres (2023); Kansas City Royals (2024–present)

Career highlights and awards
- 2× All-Star (2015, 2026); NLCS MVP (2013)
Medals
Men's baseball
Representing United States
World Baseball Classic
| Silver medal – second place | 2026 Miami | Team |

Michael Joseph Wacha (/ˈwɑːkə/; born July 1, 1991) is an American professional baseball pitcher for the Kansas City Royals of Major League Baseball (MLB). He has previously played in MLB for the St. Louis Cardinals, New York Mets, Tampa Bay Rays, Boston Red Sox, and San Diego Padres. He played college baseball for the Texas A&M Aggies.

The Cardinals selected Wacha in the first round of the 2012 MLB draft out of Texas A&M. After one year in the minor leagues, he made his major league debut on May 30, 2013. Following a strong regular season, Wacha earned the 2013 National League Championship Series Most Valuable Player Award, after yielding one run and eight hits in his first 21 postseason innings pitched. Wacha is a two-time All-Star.

== Early life ==
Michael Wacha was born in Iowa City, Iowa, to Tom and Karen Wacha as the second of four children. He has one older brother, Charlie, one younger brother, Lucas and a younger sister, Brette. He grew up a Chicago Cubs fan. When Wacha was three years old, his family moved from Iowa City to Texarkana, Texas. His future college coach, Rob Childress, first spotted Wacha pitching in an American Legion game; Wacha's father was the coach and his sister the batgirl. Wacha's uncle, Dusty Rogers, pitched in the Cincinnati Reds organization from 1984 through 1988.

== Amateur career ==
Wacha attended Pleasant Grove High School in Texarkana, Texas, where he played for the school's baseball and basketball teams. As a basketball player, he lettered three years as a forward and was chosen for the first-team all-district on his way to advancing his school to the regional finals during his senior year. In his junior baseball season, Wacha posted a 16–3 win–loss record, pitching the Hawks to the state finals. He led the Hawks to the state semi-finals in his senior year in 2009 with a 6–3 record. Wacha was a two-time all-state selection; he was selected to the all-state first-team and all-state tournament team. Excelling academically, Wacha was a member of the National Honor Society; in basketball, Wacha earned first-team academic all-state honors.

As an enrollee at Texas A&M University, Wacha played three years of college baseball for the Texas A&M Aggies. At this point, Wacha stood 6 ft 5 in (1.96 m) tall, weighed 180 pounds (82 kg), and threw his fastball with a velocity between 84 miles per hour (135 km/h) and 88 miles per hour (142 km/h). During his freshman campaign, he made ten starts in 25 total appearances and posted a 2.90 earned run average and a 9–2 record. Wacha also registered 97 strikeouts and 22 walks in 105 1/3 innings pitched. His nine wins ranked fifth and 2.90 earned run average was sixth in the Big 12 Conference. For his performance, Louisville Slugger named Wacha a freshman All-American.

In his sophomore year, Wacha posted a 9–4 record in 16 starts with 123 strikeouts and just 20 walks and a 2.29 earned run average in 129 2/3 innings pitched. His performance earned him a spot as a Third Team All-American and All-Big 12 Second Team. Wacha was a member of the USA Baseball Collegiate National Team. He also pitched in the Big 12 Championship, NCAA College Station Regional, and College World Series at the end of his sophomore year.

== Professional career ==
=== Draft and minor leagues (2012–13) ===
The Cardinals selected Wacha in the first round with the 19th overall selection of the 2012 Major League Baseball draft and signed him for $1.9 million on June 12, 2012. His draft slot originally belonged to the Los Angeles Angels of Anaheim, who, upon signing Albert Pujols as a free agent, surrendered it to the Cardinals. Cardinals director of scouting Dan Kantrovitz foresaw Wacha as a future starter for the Cardinals whose size and competitive nature drew favorable comparisons with right-handers Chris Carpenter and Adam Wainwright.

Wacha ascended quickly through the minor leagues. The Cardinals first assigned Wacha to the Gulf Coast League (Rookie League) Cardinals, then promoted him to the Palm Beach Cardinals in the Florida State League and finally to the Springfield Cardinals of the Double-A Texas League before the 2012 season ended. In 21 innings pitched between the three levels, he struck out 40 batters, allowed just eight hits, four walks, and two runs (a 0.86 earned run average). With Springfield, he pitched eight innings, struck out 17 batters, and allowed just one home run.

The Cardinals invited Wacha to their major league spring training camp in 2013. He impressed team management and players alike, striking out 15 batters while only allowing one walk and one unearned run in 11 2/3 innings of work before being reassigned to the minor league camp.

"I think that guy, right now, can pitch in the big league. That's the way I look at it. He has great stuff. He has a great presence on the mound."

— Catcher Yadier Molina on Wacha in spring training, 2013, his first in MLB

Wacha started the 2013 season with the Memphis Redbirds of the Class AAA Pacific Coast League, going 4–0 with a league-leading 2.05 earned run average in nine games started and 52 2/3 innings pitched before his first call-up to the major leagues. His overall season totals at Memphis included a 2.65 earned run average in 15 starts, 73 strikeouts and 85 innings pitched.

=== St. Louis Cardinals (2013–2019) ===
==== Rookie season (2013) ====
The Cardinals activated Wacha on May 30 to make his major league debut against the Kansas City Royals at Busch Stadium. He was 4–0 with a 2.05 earned run average in nine starts for Memphis prior to his call up. Just 364 days after throwing his last pitch for Texas A&M, Wacha was standing on a major league mound for the first time.

In his first at-bat in the majors, Wacha singled to right-center field. On the mound, he retired the first 13 Royals he faced before giving up a hit, a double in the fifth inning. That runner then scored after another hit. He pitched seven innings with 93 pitches (67 strikes), giving up only two hits and one run, walking none and striking out six, leaving with a 2–1 lead. Wacha lost the chance for a win in the ninth, when Mitchell Boggs relieved and gave up a tying home run to the first batter he faced.

The Arizona Diamondbacks scored six runs against Wacha in his second start, which turned out to be a no-decision on his part. Wacha earned his first MLB win on June 11 as the Cardinals beat the New York Mets 9–2 at Citi Field. The game got off to a rough start as he gave up a home run to the second Met batter he faced, walked three others and saw his team fall behind two runs in the first inning. However, he rebounded and scattered five hits and no more walks over six total innings of work. Three days after earning his first major league win, the Cardinals optioned Wacha back to Memphis to clear roster room for pitcher Jake Westbrook as he returned from the disabled list (DL). During his first stint with the Cardinals, Wacha posted a 1–0 record with an earned run average of 4.58 in three starts.

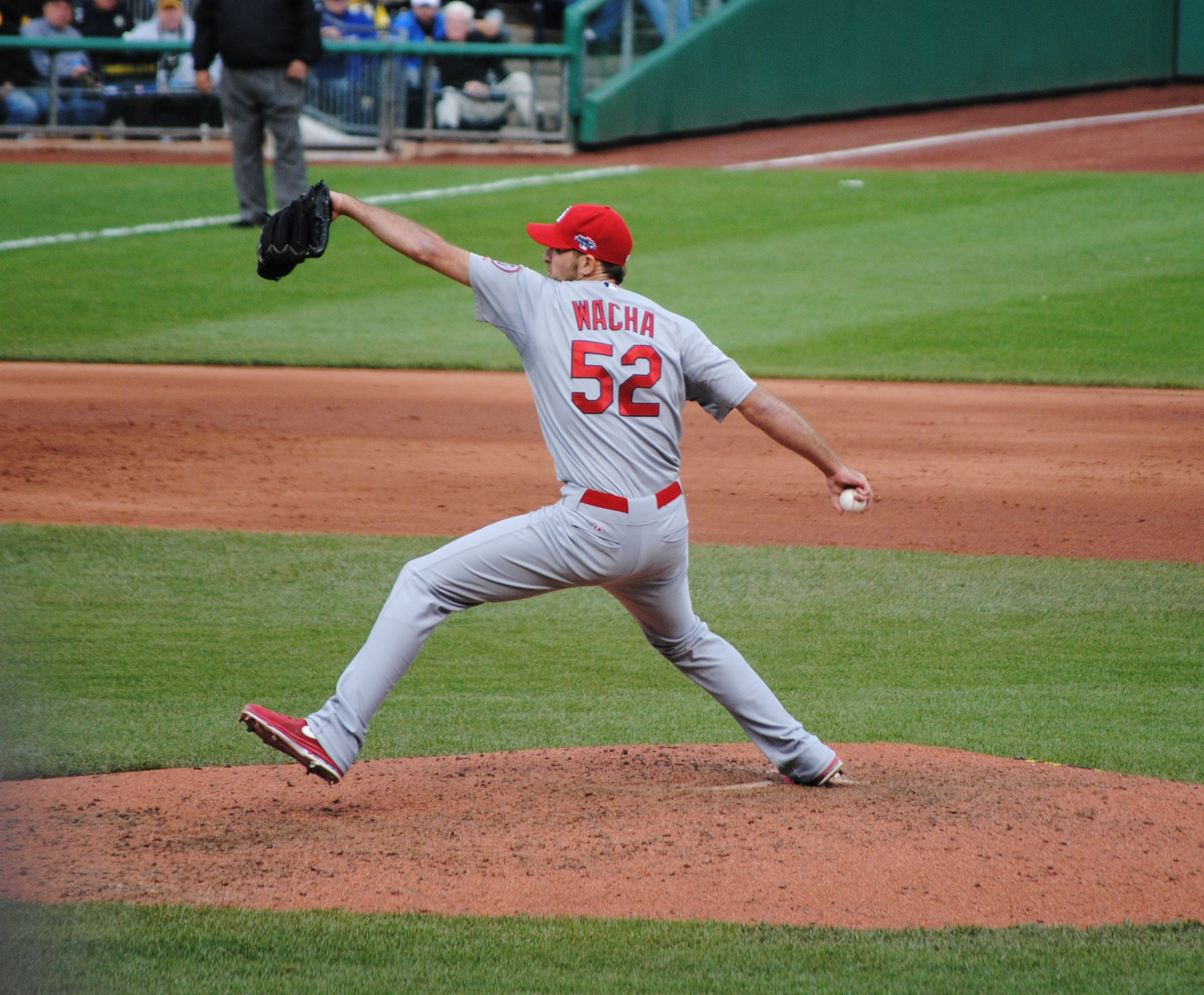
Wacha pitching in Game 4 of the 2013 NLDS, October 7, 2013

The Cardinals recalled Wacha in mid-August and he was on the roster to stay for the remainder of the season. He started one game against the Chicago Cubs before being moved to the bullpen. Manager Mike Matheny placed him back in the rotation in September. He pitched six shutout innings with just three hits against the Cincinnati Reds.

Encompassing his last regular-season game and first three playoff appearances in 2013, Wacha authored a series of masterful performances. On September 24, he pitched a no-hitter through 8 2/3 innings against the Washington Nationals that ended when Ryan Zimmerman stroked an infield single that glanced off Wacha's glove. It was Washington's only hit as the Cardinals prevailed 2–0. It was also the third potential no-hitter lost with the final out to go on the 2013 season, after Yu Darvish and Yusmeiro Petit. Wacha finished his regular season in the Major Leagues appearing in 15 games, making nine starts and pitching 64 2/3 innings. He surrendered 52 hits, twenty runs, five home runs and struck out 65 hitters for a 2.78 earned run average.

==== First playoff experience (2013) ====
On October 7, Wacha started his first Major League playoff game. In 7 1/3 innings of work in Game 4 of the 2013 National League Division Series (NLDS)—an elimination game against the Pittsburgh Pirates—he again surrendered one hit (a home run) and two walks. Due to Wacha's back-to-back one-hit performances, Matheny announced that he would start Game 2 of the National League Championship Series (NLCS). In that game on October 12, he outdueled Clayton Kershaw in 6 2/3 innings for a 1–0 victory over the Los Angeles Dodgers. In just the 11th start of his MLB career, Wacha joined Bob Gibson as the only pitchers in franchise history to strike out at least eight batters while yielding one or no runs in consecutive postseason starts.

Facing Kershaw again in Game 6, Wacha yielded just two hits in seven innings as his opponent unravelled in a 9–0 victory that sent the Cardinals to the World Series. Wacha won both of his NLCS starts, holding the Dodgers to a .149 batting average, two walks and 13 strikeouts in 13 2/3 scoreless innings pitched as he earned the NLCS Most Valuable Player. He became the fourth rookie to win a postseason Most Valuable Player Award, following Larry Sherry (1959 World Series), Mike Boddicker (1983 NLCS), and Liván Hernández (1997 NLCS and 1997 World Series). Through the NLCS, Wacha allowed just one run on eight hits in 21 innings pitched for a 0.43 earned run average while striking out 22.

Starting Game Two of the World Series against the Boston Red Sox, Wacha pitched six innings in a 4–2 Cardinals' victory, although he said after the game he "didn't have [his] best stuff." Before surrendering a home run to David Ortiz, Wacha tied Gibson with the longest scoreless streak (19 innings) in Cardinals' postseason history. Wacha became the 17th-youngest pitcher overall to win a World Series game and the second-youngest in Cardinals history behind only Paul Dean. In Game 6, with the Cardinals facing elimination once more, Wacha was again called upon to save their season after winning four consecutive playoff starts with a 1.00 earned run average and just 11 hits allowed in 27 innings for a .122 opponents' batting average. However, the Red Sox finally solved him, tagging him for six runs in 3 2/3 innings on their way to defeating the Cardinals for their eighth World Series title.

==== 2014–2015 ====
Wacha was guaranteed a regular post in the rotation at the outset of the 2014 season, and his first two starts came against the Reds. Receiving one win and one no-decision, he furthered a strong start against them. His first career 22 2/3 innings pitched against them included just 13 hits and five walks allowed with 20 strikeouts and a 0.40 earned run average. In an April 24 start against the New York Mets, Wacha struck out nine batters in the first three innings. This was just the 11th such occurrence in the expansion era. With 41 miles per hour (66 km/h) winds whipping, he struck out ten total in four innings but also walked five and required 93 pitches. Two of the walks proved costly as they were with the bases loaded; the Mets took advantage in a 3–2 triumph.

Wacha's first 15 starts of 2014 included a 2.79 earned run average and a 5–5 won-lost record. However, after pitching with lingering shoulder discomfort and fatigue in May and June, the Cardinals placed him on the disabled list on June 22. A series of magnetic resonance imaging and computed tomography tests revealed an injury termed as a stress reaction in the scapula behind his throwing arm. The stress reaction apparently was a case of the shoulder not repairing itself as fast as the strain from regular pitching had caused between the scapula bone and tendons.

Although similar to the stress fracture injury Brandon McCarthy suffered, it was deemed less severe. According to medical opinion, it was part of the same injury process, but Wacha's injury had not progressed as far as McCarthy's, as a fracture had yet to occur. Therefore, Cardinals general manager John Mozeliak stated, "As a precursor to a stress fracture, ... which is a precursor to a ... fracture," it was more manageable to correct. With limited knowledge on the related biomechanical processes, the Cardinals training and medical staff researched methods to treat Wacha's injury and prevent the same course from happening again; likewise, they were uncertain of when he was to return to play.

Wacha surrendered a series-ending, three-run walk-off home run to Travis Ishikawa of the San Francisco Giants in the ninth inning of Game 5 of the 2014 NLCS, as the Giants prevailed 6–3. Wacha finished the 2014 season with a 5–6 record, a 3.20 earned run average, and a 1.20 walks plus hits per inning pitched in 19 starts.

The Cardinals won each of Wacha's first nine starts of 2015 while he credited as the winner in seven of them. With an earned run average of 1.87, he became the first Cardinal to start with a 7–0 record since Matt Morris started 8–0 in 2005. He was selected to his first All-Star Game, played at Great American Ball Park in Cincinnati. The Cardinals skipped 10 days between two August starts over concerns about his shoulder. To that point, he was 15–4 with a 2.69 earned run average and 1.12 walks plus hits per inning pitched. In Game 3 of the NLDS against the Cubs on October 12, 2015, Wacha surrendered three home runs in 4 1/3 innings in an 8–6 loss. Wacha started 30 games in 2015, in which he was 17–7 with a 3.38 earned run average.

==== 2016–2019 ====
Wacha struggled in 2016. After the season, Dan Buffa with KSDK wrote that Wacha's struggles occurred when his "changeup becomes exposed and the fastball gets too flat, leaving the curveball to take on too much responsibility." He missed over a month due to right shoulder inflammation and finished the season with a 7–7 record in 27 games (24 starts) with a then career-high 5.09 earned run average and 1.48 walks plus hits per inning pitched.

In 2017, Wacha stayed healthy the entire season and tied a career high in starts with 30. He finished the season with a 12–9 record and 4.13 earned run average, recording a 3.41 earned run average at home and 4.97 on the road.

On June 3, 2018, against the Pirates, Wacha took a no-hitter through eight innings until giving up a leadoff single by Colin Moran in the ninth inning. Nevertheless, the Cardinals won 5–0. On June 21, Wacha was placed on the 10-day disabled list due to a left oblique strain, and did not pitch the remainder of the year. For the 2018 season, Wacha made 15 starts, going 8–2 with a 3.20 earned run average.

Wacha began the 2019 season healthy and a member of St. Louis' starting rotation. However, after compiling a 5.59 earned run average through nine starts, he was moved to the bullpen at the end of May. He ultimately began appearing as both a starter and a reliever, making 29 total appearances during the regular season, with 24 being starts. Over 126 2/3 innings pitched, he went 6–7 with a 4.76 earned run average and 104 strikeouts.

=== New York Mets (2020) ===
On December 13, 2019, the New York Mets signed Wacha to a one-year contract for the 2020 season. With the Mets during the 60-game season, Wacha pitched to a 1–4 record and 6.62 ERA with 37 strikeouts in 34 innings from eight appearances (seven starts).

=== Tampa Bay Rays (2021) ===
On December 16, 2020, Wacha signed a one-year, $3 million contract with the Tampa Bay Rays. In 29 appearances (23 starts), Wacha pitched to a 3–5 record and a 5.05 ERA while striking out 121 batters in 124 2/3 innings.

=== Boston Red Sox (2022) ===
On November 27, 2021, Wacha signed a one-year contract with the Boston Red Sox, reportedly worth $7 million. He began the season as a starter in Boston's pitching rotation. He was on the injured list due to intercostal irritation from May 8 until May 20. On June 6, Wacha tossed a complete game shutout against the Los Angeles Angels. He only walked one batter, while striking out six batters on 105 pitches. It was also the second complete game and shutout of his career. It was the 10th complete game 1–0 shutout in Red Sox franchise history, and the first since June 7, 2007, when Curt Schilling did so against the Oakland A's. Wacha was placed on the injured list on July 8 due to right shoulder inflammation. On August 4, while on a rehabilitation assignment with the Worcester Red Sox, Wacha pitched 4 2/3 innings without allowing a hit against the Durham Bulls; Andrew Politi and Chase Shugart completed the combined no-hitter. Wacha returned to Boston's active roster on August 14. In 23 starts with Boston, Wacha posted an 11–2 record with 3.32 ERA while striking out 104 batters in 127 1/3 innings.

=== San Diego Padres (2023) ===
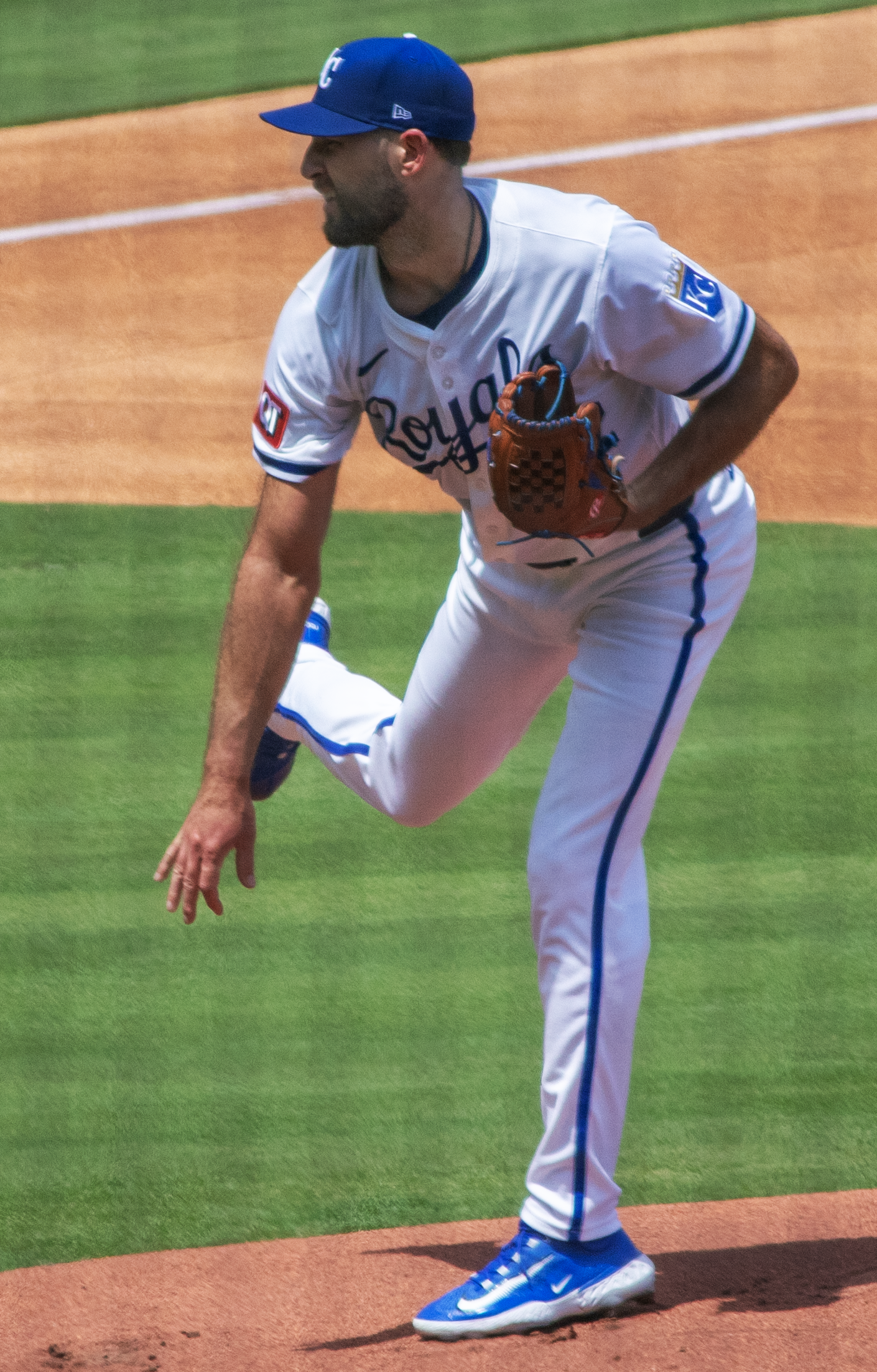
Michael Wacha on the hill in 2025.

On February 16, 2023, Wacha signed a one-year contract with the San Diego Padres. In 2023, Wacha went 14–4 with 124 strikeouts and an ERA of 3.22 in 134.1 innings pitched. From the beginning of the 2022 season to the end of the 2023 season, Wacha's 24–6 record (.800 winning percentage) was the best of any MLB pitcher, minimum 40 games started. He became a free agent following the season.

=== Kansas City Royals (2024–present) ===
On December 18, 2023, Wacha signed a two-year, $32 million contract with the Kansas City Royals which contained a player option for the second year.

On November 3, 2024, Wacha signed a three-year, $51 million contract with the Royals, containing a fourth-year option maxing out the deal at $72 million. The contract replaced the previous two-year contract that Wacha had with the Royals.

On May 7, 2025, Wacha pitched his 1,500th career inning after he pitched seven innings, allowed three hits, walked just one batter, and struck out five batters in a 2–1 victory over the Chicago White Sox. With that milestone, Wacha became the 20th active pitcher to reach that milestone as a pitcher.

== Pitching profile ==
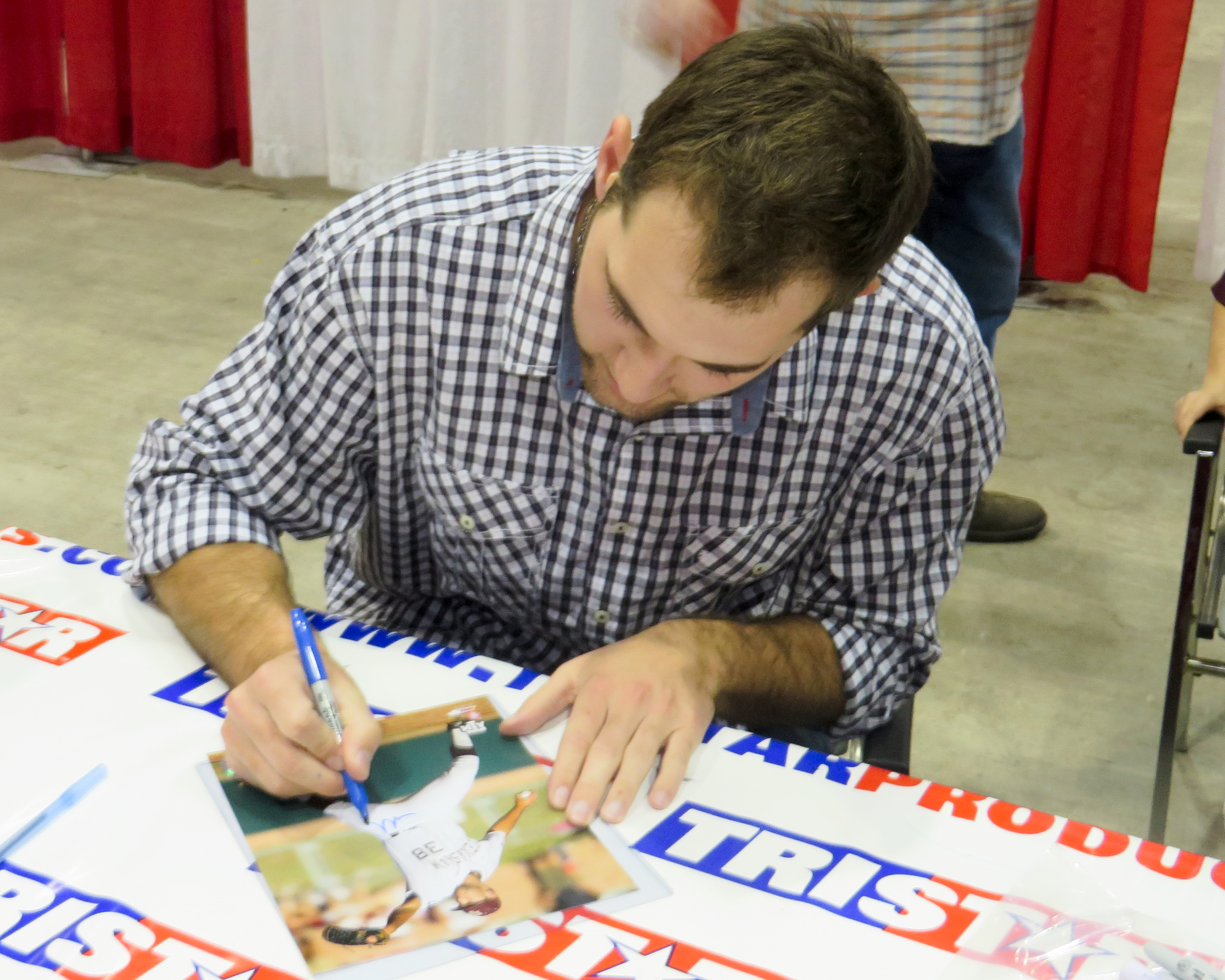
Wacha signing autographs in January 2014

Standing 6 ft 6 in (1.98 m) tall and weighing 210 pounds (95 kg), Wacha repeats the same delivery with all his pitches. Featuring a sinking fastball that usually travels between 92 miles per hour (148 km/h) and 95 miles per hour (153 km/h), Wacha frequently shows velocity up to 97 miles per hour (156 km/h). His high arm angle and release point create substantial downward action on his fastball. Wacha's fastball complement, a changeup, features deep, fading movement to right-handed hitters with a 10 miles per hour (16 km/h) to 12 miles per hour (19 km/h) decrease in velocity from his fastball. Not only is his arm angle on the two pitches the same, the arm speed appears virtually identical to the hitter, thus disguising the difference in velocity.

Wacha's third pitch is an average curveball that travels about 77 miles per hour (124 km/h) and has improved in break and consistency; in college, scouts considered his curveball a below-average pitch. He has a fourth pitch, a slider, that lacks consistent break and darts horizontally, similar to the cutter. Wacha attributed the increase in pitch velocity to gaining weight from physical exercise and increased food consumption, asserting that he "felt like the velocity just kept on increasing every single year. I changed my mechanics a little bit when I was in college, and that might have added a few ticks". Wacha added a cutter late in the 2013 season, though he only threw the pitch 1.8% of the time. During the 2014 spring training, Wacha showed increased confidence in the pitch after finding a consistent grip.

Depending on the source, Wacha shows a wide range of potential. Scouting reports initially projected him for a potential of two plus-plus pitches (fastball and changeup) with command of both. Baseball Prospectus noted that his polish due to pitch command helped fast-track him to the Major Leagues. However, a dearth of vigorous fastball life escalates the importance of command. Wacha offsets the shortage of sizable vertical movement with the pronounced descent through which his fastball, changeup and curve travel to create an additional obstacle as hitters to attempt square the bat on the pitch. In addition, the drop in elevation changes the hitter's eye level. Wacha was previously criticized for a heavy reliance on the fastball from lacking a solid breaking pitch. Before refining his curveball, Baseball Prospect Nation commented that development of a slider "to even only an occasional 'show-me' pitch would add another element to his game and allow him to become more refined in his pitch sequencing ability to work through a lineup".

During each at-bat, Wacha does not easily give in to the batter. He maintains his composure on the mound. With both fastball and changeup being plus-plus pitches and improved command, Baseball Prospectus and Baseball Prospect Nation conclude his likely future is as a solid number-three starter. However, as command of his curve has markedly improved, so have his projections. The same initial reports stated that if he could enhance his slider's reliability, he may be able to become a low-end number two starter. Still others, such as scout Ralph Garr, Jr., and Kantrovitz, project him as a "future top-of-the-rotation guy".

== Awards ==
| Award/honor | # of times | Dates (Ranking or event) | Refs |
|---|---|---|---|
Major leagues
| Major League Baseball All-Star | 1 | 2015 | |
| National League Championship Series MVP | 1 | 2013 | |
Minor leagues
| Minor League Baseball All-Star Game | 1 | 2013 (Pacific Coast League) | |
| Triple-A All-Star Game Top Star award | 1 | 2013 (Pacific Coast League player) | |
| The Cardinal Nation/Scout.com Cardinals Top Prospects | 1 | 2013 (#4) | |
| The Cardinal Nation/Scout.com Relief Pitcher of the Year | 1 | 2012 | |
College
| Baseball America Third Team All-American | 1 | 2011 | |
| Louisville Slugger Freshman All-American | 1 | 2010 | |

== Personal life ==
Michael Wacha was born on July 1, 1991, in Iowa City, Iowa.

As both a play on his last name, and the pronunciation of his first and last names together, "Wacha Wacha" became a phenomenon in 2013 following the favorite catchphrase of Fozzie Bear of The Muppets, and for its similarity to the sound effects from the Pac-Man arcade game. A restaurant in St. Louis named a milkshake the "Wacha Wacha" following his 2013 NLCS Most Valuable Player honors. The milkshake's ingredients included vanilla with chocolate chips and Cracker Jack. Although he could not remember the name of the restaurant (believed to be Fozzie's), he stated the Cracker Jack "added a little baseball flair to it".

Other nicknames include "Waka Flocka", "Wachamole", and "Wach."

Wacha and his wife Sarah (Hoffman) Wacha married in November 2020. They reside in Jupiter, Florida.

== See also ==
- List of Major League Baseball annual shutout leaders
- St. Louis Cardinals award winners and league leaders
