= Brook Hill School =

The Brook Hill School
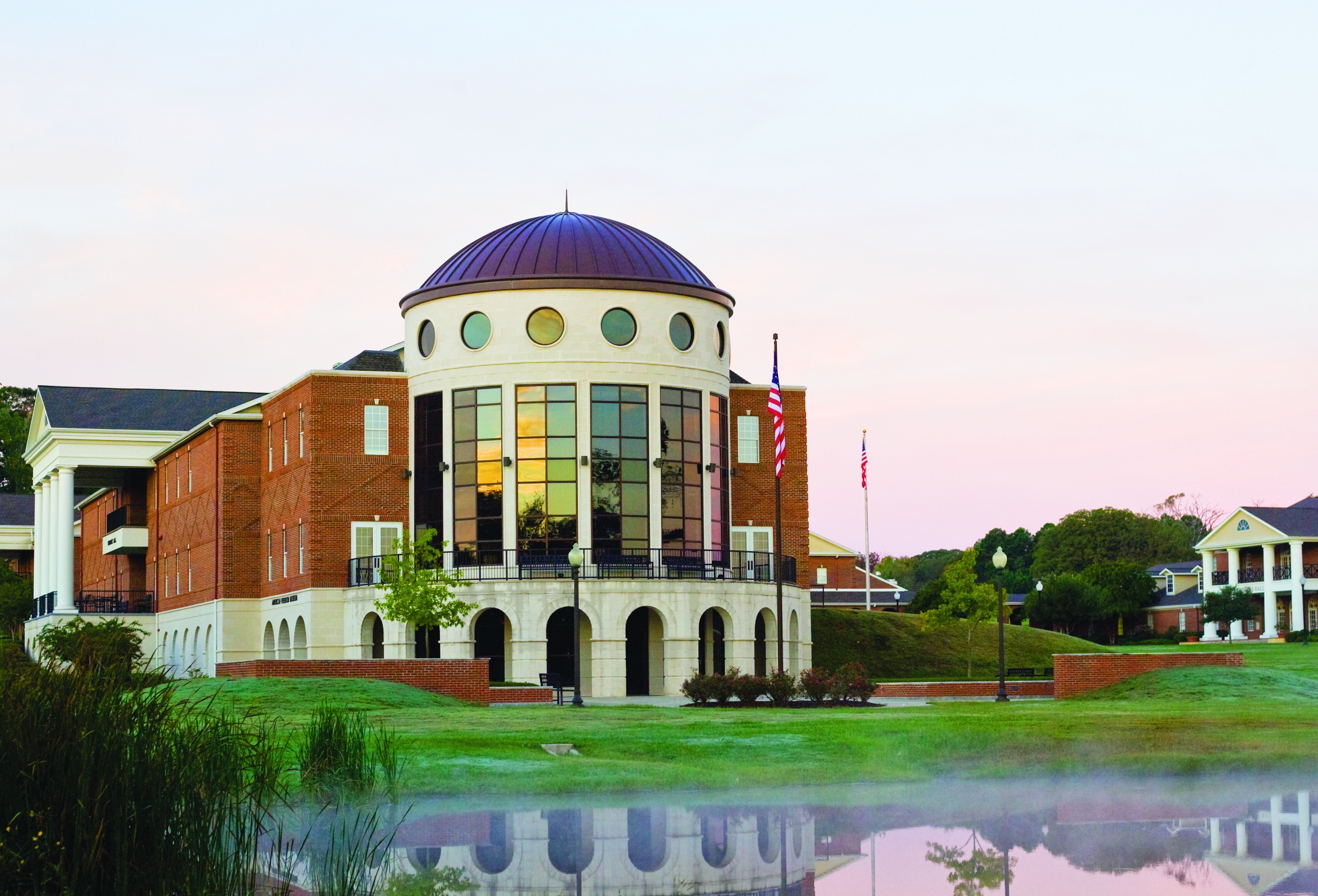

Location
- 1051 N Houston St, Tyler. Bullard, (Smith County), Texas 75757; United States; 32.1493°N 95.3301°W

Information
- Type: Private, Coeducational
- Motto: 'Christ-centered. College Prep.'
- Religious affiliation: Christian
- Established: 1997
- Head of school: Braxton Brady
- Teaching staff: 67.9 (on an FTE basis)
- Grades: PreK–12
- Enrollment: 764 (2023–34)
- Student to teacher ratio: 10.5
- Campus size: 250 acres (1,000,000 m^{2})
- Colors: Orange & Navy Blue
- Athletics conference: Texas Association of Private and Parochial Schools (TAPPS)
- Mascot: The Guard
- Accreditation: Southern Association of Colleges and Schools
- Website: brookhill.org

The Brook Hill School is an independent, Christian day and boarding school for students in grades PreK-12 located in Bullard just south of Tyler, Texas. The school was founded in 1997 by Steve Dement with thirty-one students in middle school. The boarding school began soon after in 2003. Today the school exists on 280 acres (110 ha) with approximately 760 students from East Texas and around the world with 30 countries represented among its student population.

Brook Hill also houses the American Freedom Museum, which houses artifacts from all periods of American history. The museum is open to the general public on Wednesdays and Saturdays, and to tour groups of 15 or more on all other days except Sunday when it is closed entirely.

== Accreditation ==
SACS: Southern Association of Colleges & Schools

== School Awards ==
2020, 2021, 2022, 2023, 2024, 2025 Best K-12 School in Smith County according to Niche.com 2012-2013 Henderson Cup Champions, making Brook Hill the overall best school in the state of Texas, TAPPS division 3A for Academics, Athletics, and Fine Arts.

=== State championships ===
- Boys Baseball - 2004, 2011, 2012, 2013, 2024
- Boys Golf - 2010, 2011, 2013 and 2014
- Boys Football - 2011
- Boys Soccer - 2024, 2025
- Girls Soccer - 2013, 2014
- Girls Cheerleading - 2022
- Girls Softball - 2024

== Notable alumni ==
- A.J. Minter (2012), pitcher for the New York Mets
