= A. J. Minter =

American baseball player (born 1993)

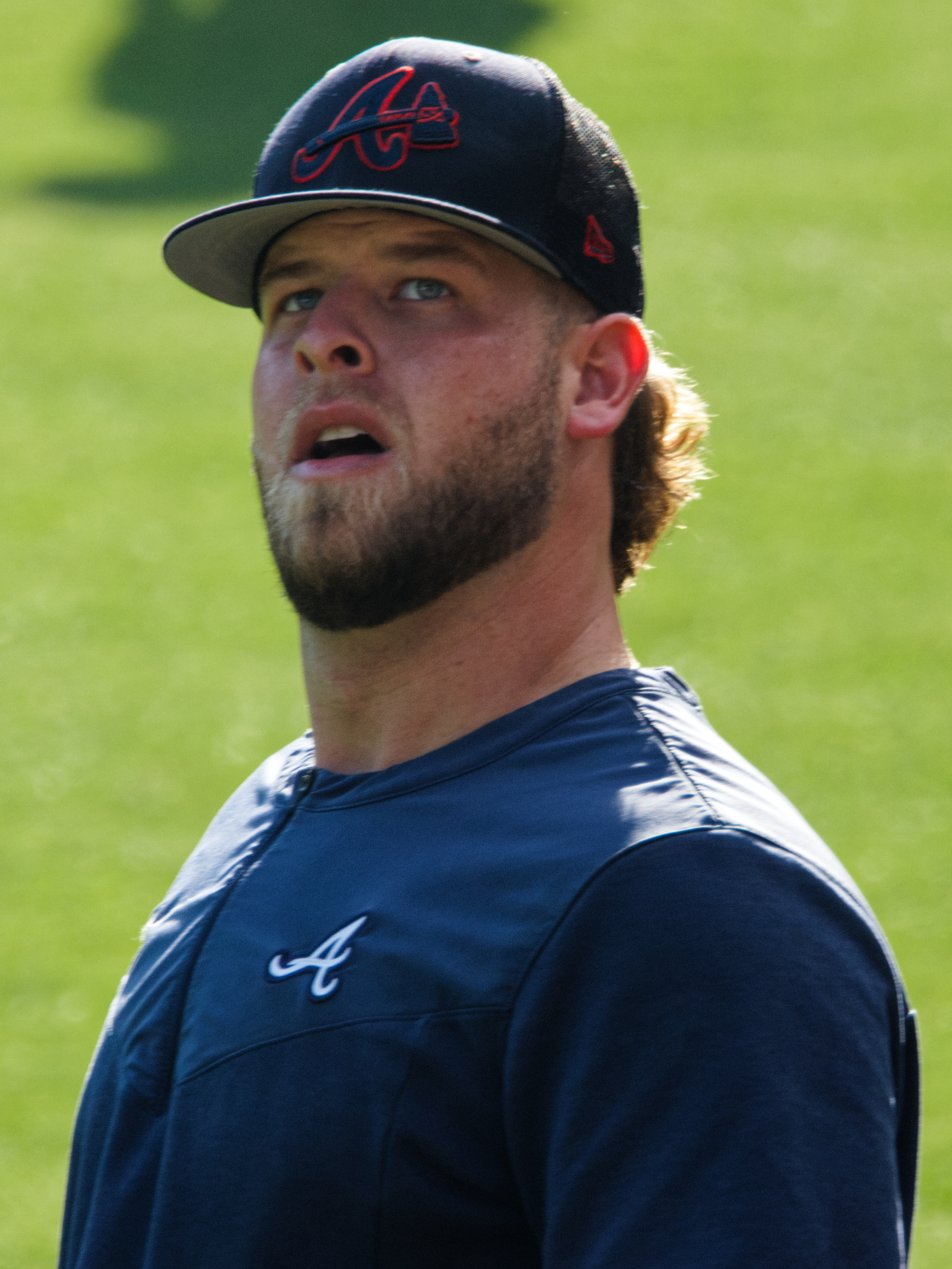
- Minter with the Braves in 2022

Free agent
- Pitcher
- Born: September 2, 1993 (age 33); Tyler, Texas, U.S.
- Bats: Left Throws: Left

MLB debut
- August 23, 2017, for the Atlanta Braves

MLB statistics (through 2026 season)
- Win–loss record: 26–31
- Earned run average: 3.15
- Strikeouts: 477
- Stats at Baseball Reference

Teams
- Atlanta Braves (2017–2024); New York Mets (2025–2026); Minnesota Twins (2026)

Career highlights and awards
- World Series champion (2021)

Alex Jordan Minter (born September 2, 1993) is an American professional baseball pitcher who is a free agent. He has played in Major League Baseball (MLB) for the Atlanta Braves, New York Mets, and Minnesota Twins. Minter played college baseball for the Texas A&M Aggies, and was selected by the Braves in the second round of the 2015 MLB draft. He made his MLB debut in 2017.

== High school and college ==
Minter attended Brook Hill School in Bullard, Texas, and was drafted by the Detroit Tigers in the 38th round of the 2012 Major League Baseball draft. He did not sign and attended Texas A&M University, where he played college baseball. After the 2014 season, he played collegiate summer baseball with the Cotuit Kettleers of the Cape Cod Baseball League. After spending his first two years pitching out of the bullpen, Minter was converted into a starting pitcher his junior year. Early in his junior season he suffered an injury which required Tommy John surgery, ending his season.

== Professional career ==
=== Atlanta Braves ===
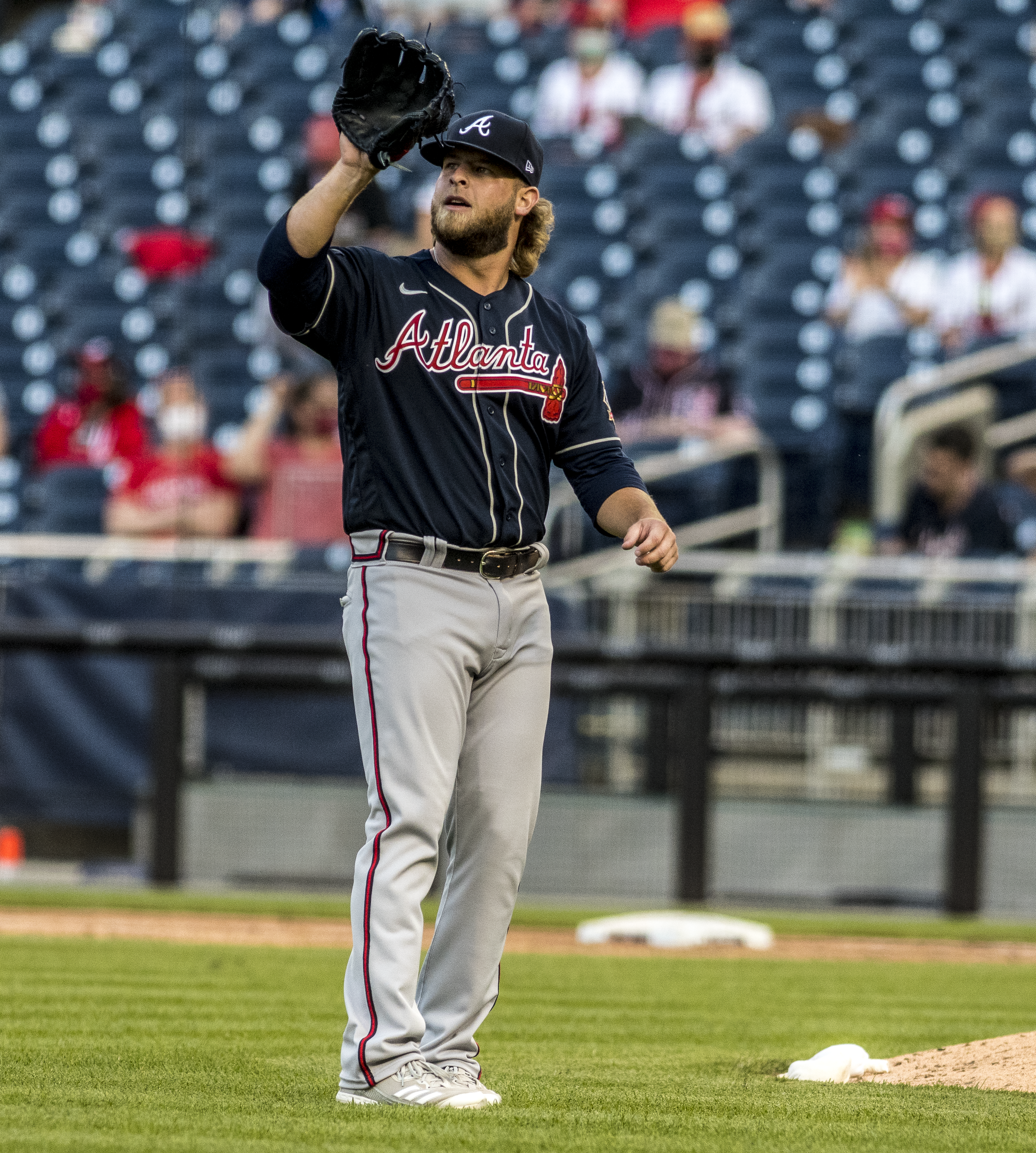
Minter with the Braves in 2021

The Atlanta Braves selected Minter in the second round of the 2015 MLB draft. He made his professional debut in 2016 for the Rome Braves. He spent two stints with the Carolina Mudcats and was promoted to the Mississippi Braves in July, where he finished the season. Minter finished 2016 with a 1.30 ERA in 34 2/3 innings. Minter began 2017 with the Florida Fire Frogs and was reassigned to Rome, the Mississippi Braves, and the Gwinnett Braves during the season.

Minter was called up to the major leagues for the first time on August 23, 2017. In 26 relief appearances for Florida, Rome, Mississippi, and Gwinnett prior to his call up he was 1–2 with a 3.33 ERA. He made his major league debut that night, in the eighth inning of a game against the Seattle Mariners. Minter spent the remainder of the 2017 season with Atlanta, pitching to a 0–1 record and 3.00 ERA in 15 innings in which he struck out 26 batters.

In 2018, Minter pitched 61 1/3 innings over 65 games, saving 15, while recording a 3.23 ERA and 69 strikeouts.

Following a fender-bender motor vehicle incident in March, the start of Minter's 2019 season was delayed. Minter replaced fellow reliever Arodys Vizcaíno as closer due to injury, but lost the role to teammate Luke Jackson by late April. Minter was optioned to the Gwinnett Braves on May 10. He returned to Atlanta in June, then was optioned to Gwinnett for a second time in August as the Braves traded for Shane Greene, Chris Martin, and Mark Melancon. Minter ended the season as a September call-up when rosters expanded, but shortly thereafter was placed on the 60-day disabled list.

For the 2019 season with the Braves, he was 3–4 with five saves and a 7.06 ERA in 36 relief appearances, in which he struck out 35 batters in 29 1/3 innings. Minter started the 2020 season at spring training with the major league team, and was optioned to Gwinnett in March. In Game 5 of the 2020 National League Championship Series, Minter made history by becoming the first MLB player ever to make their starting debut in the postseason. He pitched three innings, surrendering only one hit while striking out seven batters, also a record. In 2020, Minter was 1–1 with an 0.83 ERA, and 24 strikeouts in 21 2/3 innings over 22 relief appearances.

On July 18, 2021, Minter was optioned to the Triple-A Gwinnett Stripers following the Braves 7–5 loss to the Tampa Bay Rays. In 2021 with Atlanta, he was 3–6 with a 3.78 ERA and 57 strikeouts in 61 games. The Braves finished with an 88–73 record, clinching the NL East, and eventually won the 2021 World Series, giving the Braves their first title since 1995. In 75 games for Atlanta in 2022, Minter posted a 2.06 ERA with a career-high 94 strikeouts across 70 innings pitched.

On January 13, 2023, Minter signed a one-year, $4.2 million contract with the Braves, avoiding salary arbitration. He made 70 appearances for the team in 2023, posting a 3.76 ERA with 82 strikeouts across 64^{2}/_{3} innings pitched.

On January 11, 2024, Minter again avoided the salary arbitration process, agreeing to a one-year, $6.2 million deal. He was placed on the injured list in late May, and revealed that he had left hip impingement the following month. Although he was activated in early July, Minter returned to the injured list in mid-August with the same issue, and planned to undergo surgery. He was transferred to the 60-day injured list on August 20, effectively ending his season. Overall, Minter finished with a 5–4 record and a 2.62 ERA with 35 strikeouts across 39 games. He became a free agent after the season.

=== New York Mets ===
On January 17, 2025, Minter signed a two-year, $22 million contract with the New York Mets including an opt-out after the 2025 season. In 13 appearances for the Mets, he recorded a 1.64 ERA with 14 strikeouts over 11 innings of work. On April 26, Minter left a game against the Washington Nationals due to soreness in his triceps. On April 29, it was announced that Minter could require season-ending surgery for a left lat strain; he was transferred to the 60-day injured list two days later.

On May 26, 2026, Minter was activated from the injured list, allowing him to make his return from surgery.

=== Minnesota Twins ===
On July 31, 2026, Minter was traded to the Minnesota Twins in exchange for minor league infielders Bruin Agbayani and Billy Amick. He made 23 appearances for Minnesota, compiling a 1–1 record and 2.35 ERA with 20 strikeouts over 23 innings of work.

== Personal life ==
Minter and his wife, Anna, married in December 2025 at The Ritz-Carlton Dallas, Las Colinas.
