= Bullard Creek =

- Mouth of Bullard Creek

Location
- Country: United States
- County: Goodhue County

Physical characteristics
- Source
  - coordinates: 44.5352455°N 92.5204671°W
- Mouth
  - coordinates: 44.5602454°N 92.4526868°W

Basin features
- River system: Upper Mississippi River

Bullard Creek is a stream in Goodhue County, in the U.S. state of Minnesota.

Bullard Creek was named for George W. Bullard, an early settler.

== See also ==
- List of rivers of Minnesota
