= Brent Honeywell Jr. =

American baseball player (born 1995)

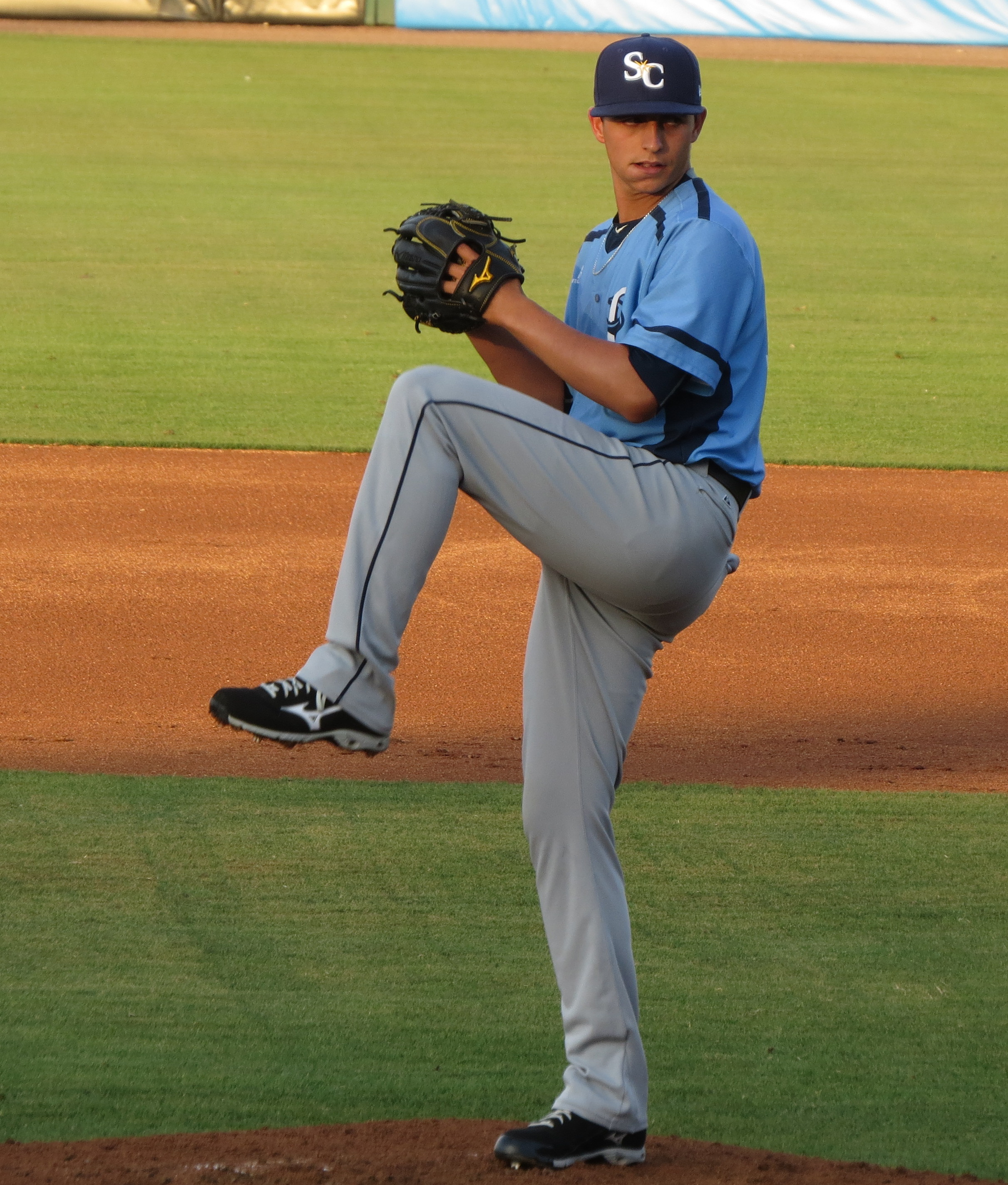
- Honeywell with the Charlotte Stone Crabs in 2016

Free agent
- Pitcher
- Born: March 31, 1995 (age 31); Carnesville, Georgia, U.S.
- Bats: Right Throws: Right

MLB debut
- April 11, 2021, for the Tampa Bay Rays

MLB statistics (through 2024 season)
- Win–loss record: 3–5
- Earned run average: 4.10
- Strikeouts: 67
- Stats at Baseball Reference

Teams
- Tampa Bay Rays (2021); San Diego Padres (2023); Chicago White Sox (2023); Pittsburgh Pirates (2024); Los Angeles Dodgers (2024)

Career highlights and awards
- World Series champion (2024)

Brent Lee Honeywell Jr. (born March 31, 1995) is an American professional baseball pitcher who is a free agent. He has previously played in Major League Baseball (MLB) for the Tampa Bay Rays, Chicago White Sox, Pittsburgh Pirates, and Los Angeles Dodgers.

The Rays selected Honeywell in the second round of the 2014 MLB draft. After 1,298 days and four arm surgeries between professional appearances, Honeywell made his MLB debut on April 11, 2021.

== Early life and amateur career ==
Honeywell was born in Carnesville, Georgia, to Brent Honeywell, Sr and Sabrina Cantera White. The elder Brent Honeywell was a high school teacher and former Minor League Baseball player from Michigan who settled in Georgia after playing for the Augusta Pirates.

Honeywell attended Franklin County High School in Carnesville, where he played baseball for his father, the school's coach. He went undrafted out of high school and attended Walters State Community College for one year, where he went 10–3 with a 2.81 earned run average (ERA), 102 strikeouts and only 15 walks. During that season, his velocity increased from the mid-80 miles per hour range into the 90s.

== Professional career ==
=== Tampa Bay Rays ===
The Tampa Bay Rays selected Honeywell in the second round of the 2014 Major League Baseball draft. He signed with the Rays and made his professional debut with the Princeton Rays. He finished his first year with a 1.07 ERA with 40 strikeouts in 33 1/3 innings over nine games (eight starts). Honeywell started 2015 with the Bowling Green Hot Rods of the Single–A Midwest League and was later promoted to the Charlotte Stone Crabs of the High–A Carolina League. He posted a combined 9–6 record with a 3.18 ERA in 24 total starts between both clubs.

Prior to the 2016 season, Honeywell appeared in preseason prospect rankings for the first time, reaching as high as 43rd in MLB.com's rankings. He began 2016 back with Charlotte, and later received a promotion to the Montgomery Biscuits of the Double–A Southern League. He finished the season with a combined 7–3 record and a 2.34 ERA in 20 starts between both teams.

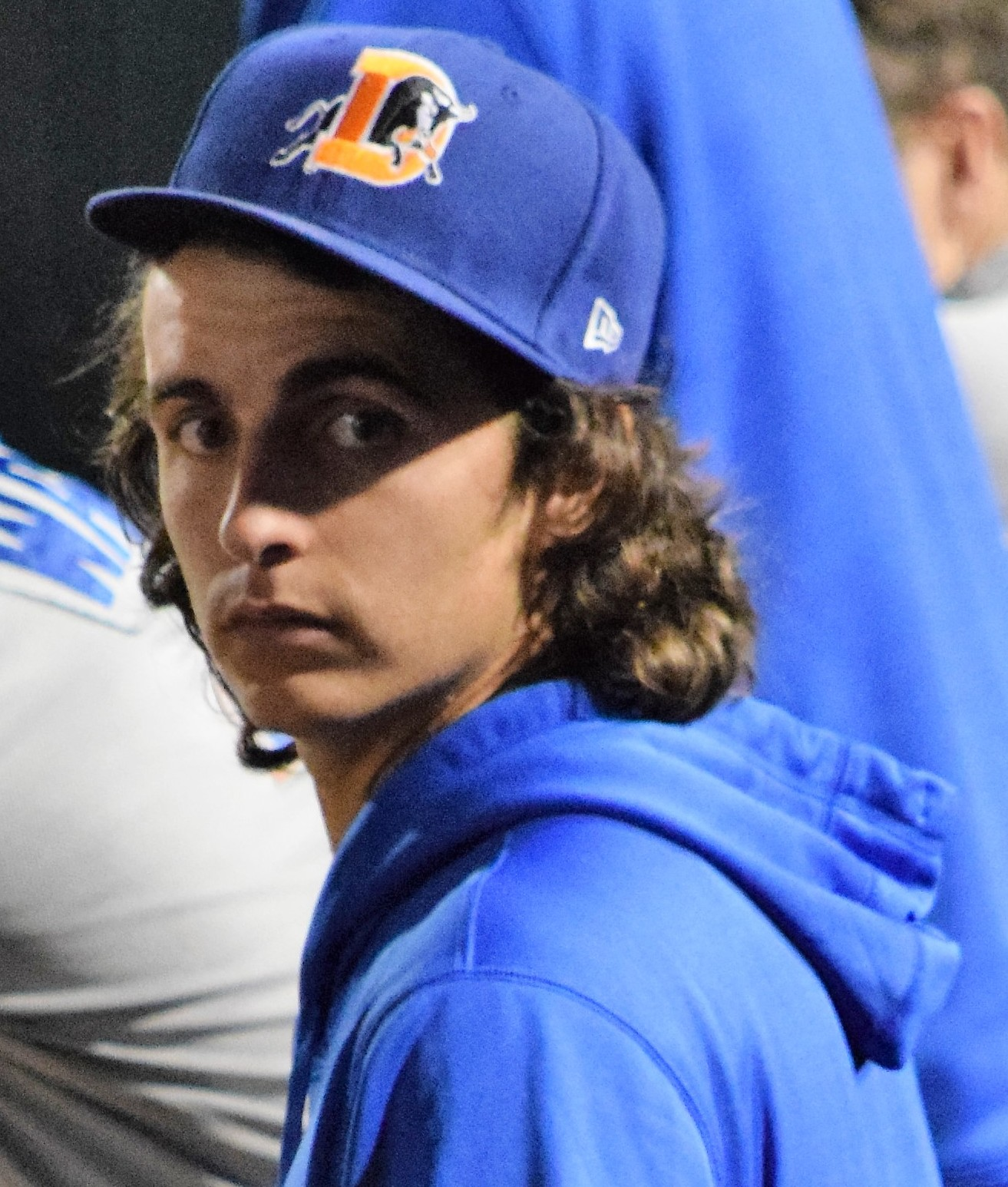
Honeywell with the Durham Bulls in 2017

Honeywell started the 2017 season with Montgomery and was quickly promoted to the Durham Bulls of the Triple–A International League. He started for the United States in the 2017 All-Star Futures Game. He earned MVP honors at the Futures Game after striking out four batters over two scoreless innings, becoming the first pitcher in Futures Game history to win the award. On August 28, 2017, Honeywell was suspended for four games by the organization due to undisclosed disciplinary reasons. In 26 total starts between Montgomery and Durham, he posted a 13–9 record with a 3.49 ERA along with 172 strikeouts in a career high 136.2 innings pitched. On November 20, he was added to the Rays 40-man roster to protect him from the Rule 5 draft.

Heading into the 2018 season, Honeywell peaked on preseason prospect lists, ranking as high as the 11th-best prospect according to Baseball America. However, on February 22, 2018, Honeywell left a spring training workout with an arm injury. The following day, he was diagnosed with a torn ulnar collateral ligament in his elbow. He underwent Tommy John surgery and was ousted for the entire 2018 season. He was optioned to Triple-A Durham on March 9, 2018, but could not participate anyway in the aftermath of Tommy John. On June 8, 2019, while throwing a bullpen session, he fractured a bone in his right elbow and was ruled out for the 2019 season. In May 2020, he underwent a compression procedure on his right ulnar nerve, removing scar tissue from around the nerve. This surgery caused him to be out for the 2020 season. Following the 2020 season, Honeywell dropped out of the preseason prospect rankings for Baseball Prospectus, MLB.com and Baseball America for the first time since the offseason after he was drafted.

On April 10, 2021, Honeywell was promoted to the major leagues for the first time and announced as the opener for the Rays’ game the next day. He made his MLB debut on April 11 against the New York Yankees, his first professional game since September 19, 2017. In the game, he recorded two perfect innings and his first two MLB strikeouts, punching out Giancarlo Stanton and Gleyber Torres. He pitched in two more games that season for the Rays, allowing four runs in 4 1/3 innings total on the season.

=== Oakland Athletics ===
On November 19, 2021, Honeywell was traded to the Oakland Athletics in exchange for cash considerations. On April 7, 2022, he was placed on the 60-day injured list after suffering a stress reaction in his right elbow. He was activated on September 11, and subsequently removed from the 40-man roster and sent outright to Triple–A. Honeywell split his season between the Single-A Stockton Ports and the Triple-A Las Vegas Aviators, accumulating an 0-3 record and 7.08 ERA with 24 strikeouts in 20 1/3 innings pitched across 13 total games and elected free agency following the season on November 10.

=== San Diego Padres ===
On January 6, 2023, Honeywell signed a major league deal with the San Diego Padres. The split deal paid $725,000 in the major leagues and $200,000 in the minor leagues. On March 29, it was announced that he had made San Diego's Opening Day roster. Honeywell made 36 appearances out of the Padres' bullpen, registering a 4.05 ERA with 42 strikeouts in 46 2/3 innings pitched. On August 2, he was designated for assignment.

=== Chicago White Sox ===
On August 5, 2023, Honeywell was claimed off waivers by the Chicago White Sox. He was designated for assignment on August 23 after allowing seven runs over 5 2/3 innings. He cleared waivers and was sent outright to the Triple–A Charlotte Knights on August 25. On October 10, he elected free agency.

=== Pittsburgh Pirates ===
On February 7, 2024, Honeywell signed a minor league contract with the Pittsburgh Pirates. In 31 games for the Triple–A Indianapolis Indians, he registered a 4.85 ERA with 33 strikeouts and seven saves across 39 innings. On July 7, the Pirates selected Honeywell's contract, adding him to the major league roster. He pitched in 3 1/3 innings over two games, allowing one run on three hits. Honeywell was designated for assignment by the Pirates on July 12.

=== Los Angeles Dodgers ===
On July 13, 2024, Honeywell was claimed off waivers by the Los Angeles Dodgers. He pitched in 10 games for the Dodgers, working 20 1/3 innings, with a 2.21 ERA, 12 strikeouts and picked up his first big league save against the San Francisco Giants on July 25. Honeywell was designated for assignment by the Dodgers on August 18. Honeywell cleared waivers and was outrighted to the Triple-A Oklahoma City Baseball Club on August 20. He was added back to the major league roster on August 31. On the season, he pitched 34 1/3 innings in 18 games with a 2.62 ERA for the Dodgers.

Honeywell was added to the National League Championship Series roster, after missing the first round of the playoffs, due to an injury to Alex Vesia. He pitched 7 2/3 innings over two games, and allowed four runs on eight hits. He pitched in long relief in two games the Dodgers lost, but the team credited him with eating innings and saving the bullpen for the next game. He made his World Series debut in the eighth inning of Game 4, allowing five runs on four hits and one walk in just one inning. He threw 50 pitches in the inning, setting a new record for the most pitches thrown in one inning of a World Series game. Honeywell was non-tendered by the Dodgers on November 22, 2024 and became a free agent.

=== San Diego Padres (second stint) ===
On February 23, 2026, Honeywell signed a minor league contract with the San Francisco Giants. He was released by San Francisco prior to the start of the regular season on March 28.

On August 14, 2026, Honeywell signed a minor league contract with the San Diego Padres. In 7 games with Triple-A El Paso Chihuahuas he threw 7.1 innings of relief going 0-2 with a 9.82 ERA with more walks (6) than strikeouts (4). He elected free agency on November 2.

== Personal life ==
His father, Brent Honeywell, played Minor League Baseball from 1988 to 1990. His father is a cousin of two-time All-Star and 1974 NL Cy Young Award winner Mike Marshall.
