= Drew Carlton =

American baseball player (born 1995)

- Pitcher
- Born: September 8, 1995 (age 31); Lakeland, Florida, U.S.
- Batted: Right Threw: Right

MLB debut
- September 4, 2021, for the Detroit Tigers

Last MLB appearance
- June 30, 2023, for the San Diego Padres

MLB statistics
- Win–loss record: 2–1
- Earned run average: 3.82
- Strikeouts: 26
- Stats at Baseball Reference

Teams
- Detroit Tigers (2021–2022); San Diego Padres (2023)

Drew Michael Carlton (born September 8, 1995) is an American former professional baseball pitcher. He played in Major League Baseball (MLB) for the Detroit Tigers and the San Diego Padres.

== Career ==
=== Detroit Tigers ===
Carlton attended George Jenkins High School in Lakeland, Florida, and Florida State University. The Detroit Tigers drafted him in the 32nd round of the 2017 MLB draft. In his first season with the organization, Carlton progressed quickly, earning a late-season call-up to the Single-A West Michigan Whitecaps by the end of the year following 14 innings of two-run ball in Low-A Connecticut. Carlton's successes would continue the following season, pitching with the High-A Lakeland Flying Tigers for the majority of the year with a 2.38 ERA over 56.2 innings in 34 appearances with a 1.01 WHIP. He would move up to the Double-A Erie SeaWolves that season, where he made five appearances, allowing two earned runs in 11 innings pitched.

He remained in Erie for the entire 2019 season, serving as the team's primary closer, going 19/20 in save opportunities with a 1.46 ERA in 68 innings pitched. Carlton's WHIP was under one (0.97) and he allowed just a .200 batting average against while striking out 65.

In 2020, Carlton, like many minor league players, missed the minor league season due to the COVID-19 pandemic, however, that winter, Carlton would move out to the Dominican Republic to play for Leones del Escogido in the Dominican Winter League. In the Winter League, Carlton gave up just nine hits, one walk, and one run over 14.1 innings.

To begin the 2021 season, Carlton pitched for the Triple-A Toledo Mud Hens. He pitched 49 innings with a 3.12 ERA, ten walks and 48 strikeouts.

Carlton was called up and made his Major League debut on September 4, 2021. In his debut he threw only one pitch, retiring Delino DeShields Jr. with a runner at third and two outs. At the time of his call-up, 17 of the 31 players drafted ahead of Carlton by the Tigers in 2017 were no longer playing in the league. On November 9, 2021, Carlton was outrighted off of the 40-man roster.

He was assigned to Triple-A Toledo to begin the 2022 season. In 15.0 innings of work, he recorded a 3.60 ERA and 30.2% strikeout rate. On May 20, 2022, Carlton had his contract selected to the 40-man and active roster. On July 15, 2022, Carlton was designated for assignment. He cleared waivers and was sent outright to Triple-A Toledo on July 19. On October 13, Carlton elected free agency.

=== San Diego Padres ===
On December 12, 2022, Carlton signed a minor league contract that included an invitation to spring training with the San Diego Padres. He was assigned to the Triple-A El Paso Chihuahuas to begin the 2023 season, where he pitched to a 1.13 ERA with 18 strikeouts across 13 appearances. On May 15, 2023, Carlton's contract was selected to the active roster. In 11 games, he pitched to a 4.35 ERA with 18 strikeouts in 20 2/3 innings of work. On July 1, Carlton was placed on the injured list with right elbow inflammation. He was transferred to the 60–day injured list on August 14. Following the season on November 2, Carlton was removed from the 40-man roster and sent outright to Triple–A El Paso. He elected free agency on November 6.

On November 7, 2023, Carlton re–signed with the Padres on a new minor league contract. He did not appear for the organization in 2024 and elected free agency following the season on November 4, 2024.
