= Figarden, California =

Unincorporated community in California, United States

Figarden
- Unincorporated community
- Location in California Figarden (the United States)
- Coordinates: 36°49′22″N 119°51′45″W
- Country: United States
- State: California
- County: Fresno
- Elevation: 315 ft (96 m)

Figarden (formerly Bullard and Fig Garden) was an unincorporated community in Fresno County, California, United States. It is located 6 miles (9.7 km) northwest of downtown Fresno, at an elevation of 315 feet (96 m).

A post office operated at Figarden from 1925 to 1944, moving in 1939, then from 1947 to 1951.

In the early twentieth century, Figarden was a center of fig cultivation and a number of fig varieties were originated there. Figarden had a general store, garage, fruit packing plants, and boarding house for travelers on the Santa Fe Railroad. By 1973, the town was being consumed by development, with the growth of nearby Fresno. Today, Figarden is essentially a residential district of northwestern Fresno.
