= Tom Cosgrove (baseball) =

American baseball player (born 1996)

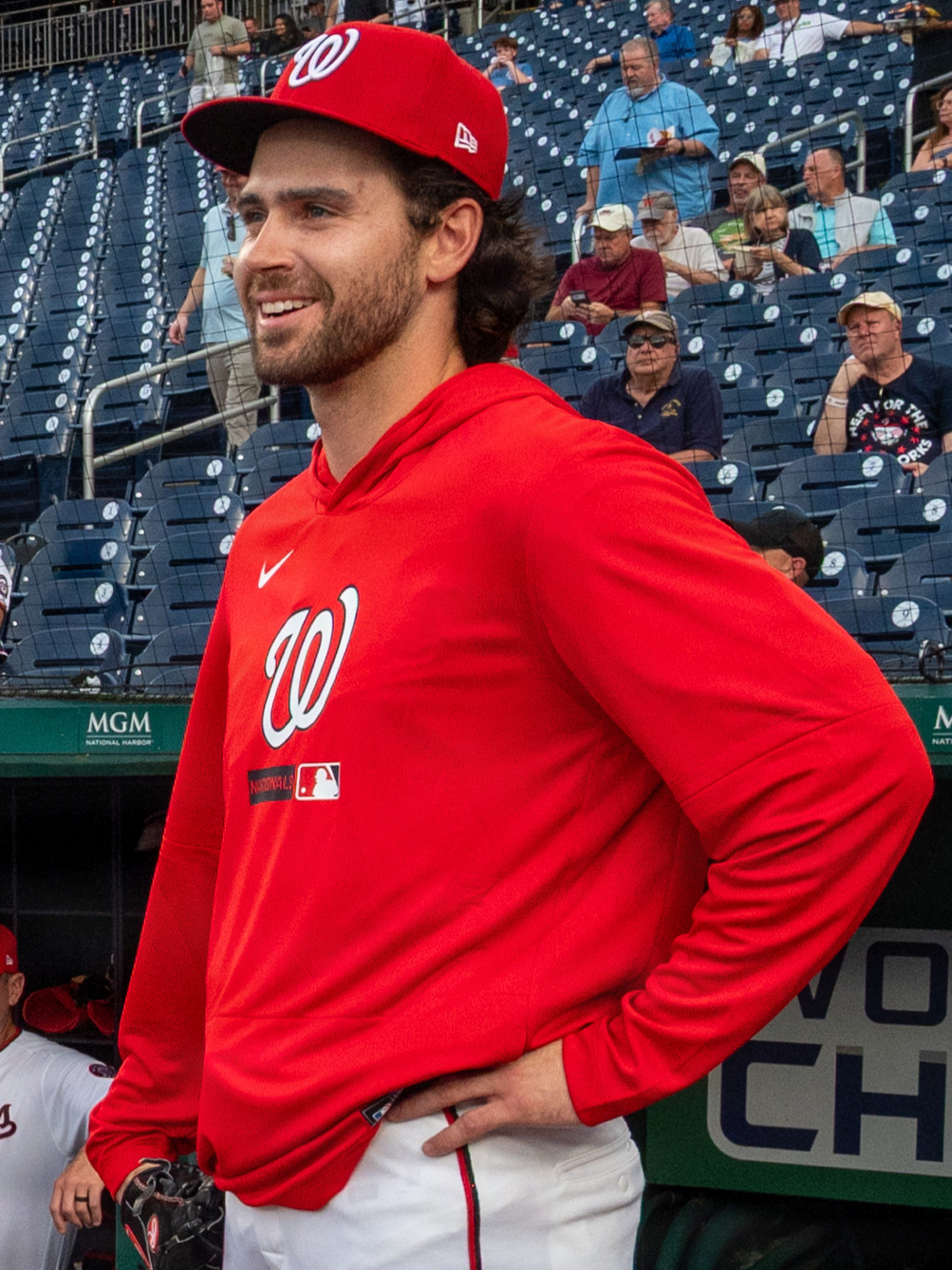
- Cosgrove with the Washington Nationals in 2026

Free agent
- Pitcher
- Born: June 14, 1996 (age 30); Staten Island, New York, U.S.
- Bats: Left Throws: Left

MLB debut
- April 29, 2023, for the San Diego Padres

MLB statistics (through 2026 season)
- Win–loss record: 2–5
- Earned run average: 4.59
- Strikeouts: 76
- Stats at Baseball Reference

Teams
- San Diego Padres (2023–2024); Chicago Cubs (2025); Washington Nationals (2026)

Thomas Cosgrove (born June 14, 1996) is an American professional baseball pitcher who is a free agent. He has previously played in Major League Baseball (MLB) for the San Diego Padres, Chicago Cubs, and Washington Nationals. He made his MLB debut in 2023.

== Amateur career ==
Cosgrove attended Monsignor Farrell High School in Staten Island, New York. He attended Manhattan College and played college baseball for the Manhattan Jaspers. In 2016, he played collegiate summer baseball with the Wareham Gatemen and Chatham Anglers of the Cape Cod Baseball League.

== Professional career ==
=== San Diego Padres ===
The San Diego Padres selected Cosgrove in the 12th round, with the 348th overall selection, of the 2017 Major League Baseball draft.

Cosgrove spent his first professional season with the rookie–level Arizona League Padres and the Low–A Tri-City Dust Devils. In 13 games (6 starts), he logged a 1–4 record and 3.22 ERA with 41 strikeouts in 44 2/3 innings pitched. He spent 2018 with the Single–A Fort Wayne TinCaps, appearing in 24 contests (21 starts) and going 3–6 with a 3.71 ERA and 122 strikeouts in 116 1/3 innings of work. In 2019, Cosgrove made only 9 appearances (all starts), splitting his time between the AZL Padres and the High–A Lake Elsinore Storm. Cosgrove did not play in a game in 2020 due to the cancellation of the minor league season because of the COVID-19 pandemic.

Cosgrove returned to action in 2021, and made 22 appearances for the Double–A San Antonio Missions, posting a 2.36 ERA with 32 strikeouts in 26 2/3 innings pitched. Cosgrove split the 2022 season between San Antonio and the Triple–A El Paso Chihuahuas. In a career–high 48 appearances, he registered an 8–2 record and 3.72 ERA with 82 strikeouts in 55 2/3 innings of work. On November 15, 2022, the Padres added Cosgrove to their 40-man roster to protect him from the Rule 5 draft.

Cosgrove was optioned to Triple-A El Paso to begin the 2023 season. On April 26, 2023, Cosgrove was promoted to the major leagues for the first time. He made 54 appearances for San Diego during his rookie campaign, compiling a 1-2 record and 1.75 ERA with 44 strikeouts and one save across 51 1/3 innings pitched.

Cosgrove made 18 appearances for the Padres in 2024, but struggled to an 0-1 record and 11.66 ERA with 15 strikeouts over 14 2/3 innings of work. He was optioned to Triple-A El Paso to begin the 2025 season. In 4 appearances for the Chihuahuas, Cosgrove posted a 1–0 record and 7.36 ERA with 2 strikeouts across 3 2/3 innings pitched. Cosgrove was designated for assignment by the Padres on April 6, 2025.

=== Chicago Cubs ===
On April 10, 2025, Cosgrove was traded to the Chicago Cubs in exchange for cash considerations; he was subsequently optioned to the Triple-A Iowa Cubs. In two appearances for Chicago, he recorded a 2.25 ERA with three strikeouts over four innings of work. Cosgrove was designated for assignment by the Cubs on August 31. He cleared waivers and was sent outright to Triple-A Iowa on September 3. Cosgrove elected free agency following the season on November 6.

=== Houston Astros ===
On January 29, 2026, Cosgrove signed a minor league contract with the Houston Astros. Cosgrove made 29 appearances for the Triple–A Sugar Land Space Cowboys, compiling a 2–1 record and 4.30 ERA with 29 strikeouts across 29 1/3 innings pitched.

=== Washington Nationals ===
On July 3, 2026, The Washington Nationals acquired Cosgrove from the Astros in exchange for cash considerations. They promoted him to the major league roster on July 10, after just one appearance with the Triple–A Rochester Red Wings. Cosgrove made 18 appearances for Washington, struggling to a 1–2 record and 7.71 ERA with 14 strikeouts and one save across 16 1/3 innings pitched. He was designated for assignment by the Nationals on September 2. Cosgrove cleared waivers and was sent outright to Rochester on September 4. He elected free agency on November 2.
