= Bullard Independent School District =

Public school district in Texas

Bullard Independent School District is a public school district based in Bullard, Texas, United States.

The district is located in southwestern Smith County and extends into a small portion of northwestern Cherokee County.

In 2009, the school district was rated "academically acceptable" by the Texas Education Agency. In 2019 and 2022, the school district was given an overall accountability grade of "A" by the Texas Education Agency. For the years 2023-2025, the school district was given an overall accountability grade of "B" by the Texas Education Agency.

== Schools ==
- Bullard High School (grades 9-12)
- Bullard Middle School (grades 7-8)
- Bullard Intermediate School (grades 5-6)
- Bullard Elementary School (grades 3-4)
- Bullard Primary School (grades 1-2)
- Bullard Early Childhood School (prekindergarten and kindergarten)

In 2022, voters approved a combined $103 million bond measure to fund the construction of new sports complexes and a new 179,000-square-foot middle school campus in addition to renovations to existing district buildings. The new middle school will serve about 1,200 students in grades 6-8 and was expected to open in time for the start of the 2025-2026 academic year. In May 2025, the school district announced delays to the new middle school opening, giving a new target opening date of January 2026.
