= Bullard High School (Bullard, Texas) =

Location
- 1426 South Houston Street; Bullard, Texas 75757-5261; United States; 32.1326°N 95.3168°W

Information
- School type: Public high school
- Motto: Lead The Way
- School district: Bullard Independent School District
- Principal: Chad Bentley
- Teaching staff: 72.75 (FTE)
- Grades: 9-12
- Enrollment: 891 (2023–2024)
- Student to teacher ratio: 12.25
- Colors: Red, White & Blue
- Athletics conference: UIL Class AAAA
- Mascot: Panther
- Website: Bullard High School

Bullard High School is a public high school located on the southern edge of the city of Bullard, Texas in Cherokee County, United States. It is classified as a 4A school by the UIL. The school is a part of the Bullard Independent School District that serves students in southern Smith County and northern Cherokee County. For the 2021-2022 school year, the school was given an "A" by the Texas Education Agency.

== Athletics ==
The Bullard Panthers compete in the following sports:

- Baseball
- Basketball
- Cross Country
- Football
- Golf
- Powerlifting
- Softball
- Tennis
- Track and Field
- Volleyball
- Soccer

=== State titles ===
- Boys Golf
  - 1976(B), 1980(1A)
- Girls Golf
  - 1984(2A), 1985(2A), 1986(2A), 1991(2A), 1992(2A)
- Softball
  - 2026(4A/D1)
- Boys Powerlifting (Hunter Phelps)
  - 2014 (3A), 2015 (3A)
- Food Eating (Grayson Carlile and Elijah Buchanan) 2024, 2025
- Rust E-Sports (Ethan Johnson) 2025

== Notable alumni ==
- Nick Rumbelow (2009), former MLB pitcher
- Hagen Smith (2021), pitcher in the Chicago White Sox organization
