= Bullard, Texas =

- Town
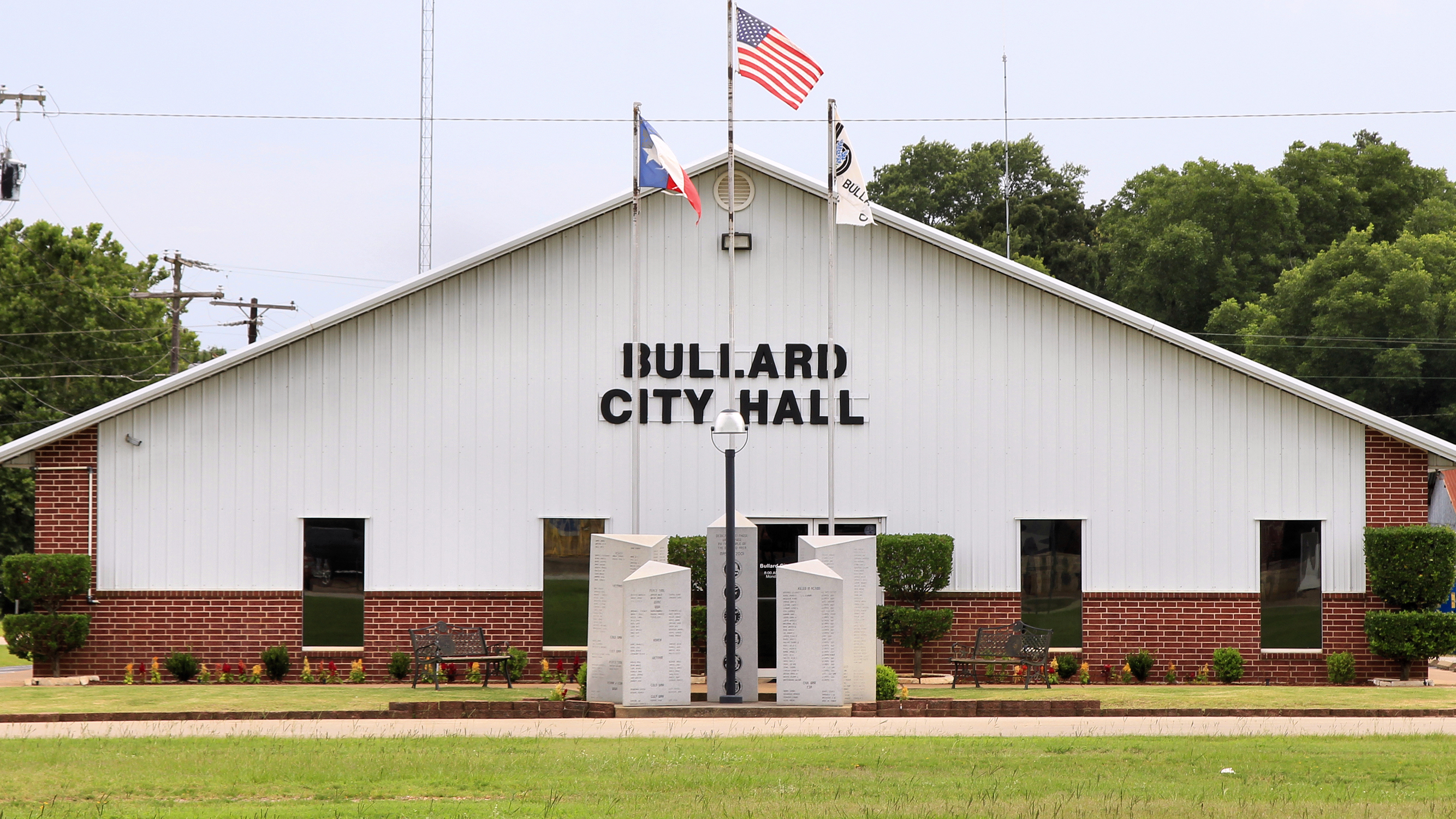
- Bullard City Hall
- Interactive map of Bullard, Texas
- Coordinates: 32°08′20″N 95°18′48″W
- Country: United States
- State: Texas
- Counties: Smith and Cherokee
- Settled: 1870
- Founded: 1881
- Incorporated: 1948

Government
  - Type: Council–manager

Area
  - Total: 3.36 sq mi (8.69 km^{2})
  - Land: 3.34 sq mi (8.66 km^{2})
  - Water: 0.012 sq mi (0.03 km^{2})
- Elevation: 492 ft (150 m)

Population (2020)
  - Total: 3,318
  - Density: 992/sq mi (383/km^{2})
- Time zone: UTC-6 (Central (CST))
  - Summer (DST): UTC-5 (CDT)
- ZIP code: 75757
- Area codes: 903, 430
- FIPS code: 48-11212
- GNIS feature ID: 2411742
- Website: www.bullardtexas.net

Bullard is a small town in the Smith and Cherokee counties in the east-central part of the U.S. state of Texas. U.S. Route 69 and Farm-to-Market Roads 2137, 2493, and 344 intersect here, about 15 miles (24 km) south of the larger city of Tyler. Its population was 3,318 at the 2020 census, up from 2,463 at the 2010 census.

The Smith County portion of the town is part of the Tyler metropolitan statistical area, while the Cherokee County portion is part of the Jacksonville micropolitan statistical area.

Bullard was earlier known as "Etna" and "Hewsville". The town is named for John H. Bullard, a Confederate soldier, and Emma Eugenia (Erwin) Bullard. In 1881, John Bullard opened the Hewsville post office in his store. In 1883, the Etna post office, near Hewsville, was closed. Then, the Hewsville office was renamed "Bullard". Many rural residents in northern Cherokee County are served by the Bullard post office. The bypassing of the railroad brought about the demise of Etna and the rise of Bullard.

== History ==
The Etna post office, just west of Bullard, was granted in 1867, although settlers had been in the vicinity since the early 1850s. John and Emma Bullard arrived about 1870. A new post office named Hewsville was opened in the Bullards' store in 1881. The Etna post office was closed in 1883 and the Hewsville post office was renamed as Bullard.

When the Kansas and Gulf Short Line Railroad extended its route from Tyler to Lufkin, it passed through Bullard and built a depot there. This attracted new residents and businesses. In 1890, the town had 200 residents and most essential businesses, plus a doctor and a telegraph office. The railroad was renamed several times, becoming the St. Louis, Arkansas, and Texas Railway and then (1892) the Tyler and Southwestern Railway.

In 1903, the two public schools (segregated) had five teachers and 186 students between them. By 1914, the population had doubled to 400 and the railroad changed names once again, becoming the St. Louis Southwestern Railroad.

Its population was 450 after World War II. The community did not organize to elect a city council until 1948.

By the mid-1960s, the population had declined to 300, but it rebounded by 1973 when it reached 573. The community is now concentrated around the crossroads. Most residents commute for work to nearby Tyler.

== Geography ==
Bullard is located in southern Smith County, with a small portion extending south into Cherokee County. Four-lane U.S. Route 69 passes through the east side of town, leading north to Tyler and south to Jacksonville.

According to the U.S. Census Bureau, Bullard has a total area of 3.4 square miles (8.7 km^{2}), of which 0.01 square miles (0.03 km^{2}), or 0.36%, is covered by water.

== Demographics ==
Historical population
Census	Pop.	Note	%±
1950	317		—
1960	364		14.8%
1970	573		57.4%
1980	681		18.8%
1990	890		30.7%
2000	1,150		29.2%
2010	2,463		114.2%
2020	3,318		34.7%
U.S. Decennial Census; 2020 Census

=== 2020 census ===
As of the 2020 census, Bullard had a population of 3,318. The median age was 33.6 years. 31.8% of residents were under the age of 18 and 11.5% of residents were 65 years of age or older. For every 100 females there were 90.4 males, and for every 100 females age 18 and over there were 89.2 males age 18 and over.

0.0% of residents lived in urban areas, while 100.0% lived in rural areas.

There were 1,129 households in Bullard, of which 49.9% had children under the age of 18 living in them. Of all households, 63.4% were married-couple households, 11.2% were households with a male householder and no spouse or partner present, and 23.1% were households with a female householder and no spouse or partner present. About 17.6% of all households were made up of individuals and 8.9% had someone living alone who was 65 years of age or older.

There were 1,201 housing units, of which 6.0% were vacant. The homeowner vacancy rate was 0.5% and the rental vacancy rate was 8.1%.

Racial composition as of the 2020 census
Race	Number	Percent
White	2,806	84.6%
Black or African American	115	3.5%
American Indian and Alaska Native	24	0.7%
Asian	29	0.9%
Native Hawaiian and Other Pacific Islander	0	0.0%
Some other race	107	3.2%
Two or more races	237	7.1%
Hispanic or Latino (of any race)	278	8.4%

=== Demographic estimates ===
As of the census of 2023, there are 4,848 people residing in the town. The racial make up of the town consists of Bullard being White (76.3%) followed by Hispanic (14.8%) and other ethnicities making up (4.1%).

The median age for Bullard residents is 32.4 years. In 2023, the median household income of Bullard households was $108,304.

== Education ==
The town of Bullard is served by the Bullard Independent School District. The schools of BISD are Bullard Early Childhood, Primary, Bullard Elementary, Bullard Intermediate, Bullard Middle, and Bullard High School. The town of Bullard is also the home of Brook Hill School, a private, Christian school serving Pre-K–12th grade students.
