= 2023 Chicago White Sox season =

2023 Chicago White Sox
- League: American League
- Division: Central
- Ballpark: Guaranteed Rate Field
- City: Chicago
- Record: 61–101 (.377)
- Divisional place: 4th
- Owners: Jerry Reinsdorf
- General managers: Rick Hahn (fired August 22); Chris Getz (promoted August 31)
- Managers: Pedro Grifol
- Television: NBC Sports Chicago; NBC Sports Chicago+
- Radio: ESPN Chicago; Chicago White Sox Radio Network
- Stats: ESPN.com; Baseball Reference

The 2023 Chicago White Sox season was the club's 124th season in Chicago, their 123rd in the American League and their 33rd at Guaranteed Rate Field. It is also the team's first season under the management of Pedro Grifol.

On August 22 after starting the season 49–76, owner Jerry Reinsdorf fired general manager Rick Hahn and executive vice president Kenny Williams. After a loss to the Orioles on August 29, the White Sox failed to improve on their 81–81 record from the 2022 season. They were eliminated from playoff contention on September 10, following their loss to the Detroit Tigers.

The Chicago White Sox drew an average home attendance of 21,405 in 78 home games in the 2023 MLB season.

== Offseason ==
=== Rule changes ===
Pursuant to the CBA, new rule changes will be in place for the 2023 season:

- institution of a pitch clock between pitches;
- limits on pickoff attempts per plate appearance;
- limits on defensive shifts requiring two infielders to be on either side of second and be within the boundary of the infield; and
- larger bases (increased to 18-inch squares);

=== Manager ===
On October 3, 2022, with three games left of the 2022 regular season, White Sox manager Tony La Russa announced he would step down as manager due to concerns about his health. On November 1, the White Sox hired Kansas City Royals bench coach Pedro Grifol as their 42nd manager. Grifol had been with the Royals since 2013 and was named their bench coach in 2020.

=== Transactions ===
- December 4, 2022: RHP Mike Clevinger signs a one-year, $12 million contract.
- January 3, 2023: OF Andrew Benintendi signs a five-year, $75 million contract.
- January 11, 2023: INF Hanser Alberto signs a minor-league deal with the team.
- February 20, 2023: INF Elvis Andrus signs to a one-year, $3 million contact.

=== Mike Clevinger abuse allegations ===
Weeks after Mike Clevinger signed with the White Sox, the mother of one of his children, Olivia Finestead, accused him of domestic violence and child abuse. Finestead alleged via her Instagram account that Clevinger had repeatedly beaten her as well as used chewing tobacco on their child. Major League Baseball announced that Clevinger was under investigation for these charges, with the White Sox adding that they had no knowledge of the investigation prior to signing Clevinger. Clevinger was ultimately not disciplined for these accusations, with the league adding in a statement that the pitcher had agreed to voluntarily submit himself to evaluations by the joint treatment boards.

=== Liam Hendriks announces he has cancer ===
On January 8, 2023, White Sox closer Liam Hendriks announced that he was diagnosed with non-Hodgkin lymphoma and was beginning treatment. Many former and current players, other teams, and personnel around Major League Baseball came out and showed their support for Liam. On April 3, just before the start in the White Sox Opening Day game against the San Francisco Giants, Hendriks appeared on the Guaranteed Rate Field video board stating that he was starting his last round of chemotherapy and was hoping to get back playing again soon. Two days after that announcement, Hendriks announced on his Instagram that he has finished chemotherapy.

== Regular season ==
=== Transactions ===
- July 26: White Sox trade pitchers Lucas Giolito and Reynaldo López to the Los Angeles Angels for catcher Edgar Quero and LHP Ky Bush.
- July 28: White Sox trade pitcher Kendall Graveman to the Houston Astros for catcher Korey Lee. White Sox also trade pitchers Lance Lynn and Joe Kelly to the Los Angeles Dodgers for pitchers Nick Nastrini and Jordan Leasure and outfielder Trayce Thompson.
- August 1: White Sox trade cash considerations to the Tampa Bay Rays for pitcher Luis Patiño. White Sox also trade pitcher Keynan Middleton to the New York Yankees for pitcher Juan Carela. White Sox also trade infielder Jake Burger to the Miami Marlins for pitcher Jake Eder.

=== Opening day starters ===
Name	Pos.
Anderson	SS
Robert	CF
Vaughn	1B
Jimenez	DH
Moncada	3B
Benintendi	LF
Grandal	C
Andrus	2B
Gonzalez	RF
Cease	P

== Season standings ==
=== American League Central ===
AL Central
Team	W	L	Pct.	GB	Home	Road
Minnesota Twins	87	75	.537	—	47‍–‍34	40‍–‍41
Detroit Tigers	78	84	.481	9	37‍–‍44	41‍–‍40
Cleveland Guardians	76	86	.469	11	42‍–‍39	34‍–‍47
Chicago White Sox	61	101	.377	26	31‍–‍50	30‍–‍51
Kansas City Royals	56	106	.346	31	33‍–‍48	23‍–‍58

=== American League Wild Card ===
Division leaders
Team	W	L	Pct.
Baltimore Orioles	101	61	.623
Houston Astros	90	72	.556
Minnesota Twins	87	75	.537

Wild Card teams (Top 3 teams qualify for postseason)
Team	W	L	Pct.	GB
Tampa Bay Rays	99	63	.611	+10
Texas Rangers	90	72	.556	+1
Toronto Blue Jays	89	73	.549	—
Seattle Mariners	88	74	.543	1
New York Yankees	82	80	.506	7
Boston Red Sox	78	84	.481	11
Detroit Tigers	78	84	.481	11
Cleveland Guardians	76	86	.469	13
Los Angeles Angels	73	89	.451	16
Chicago White Sox	61	101	.377	28
Kansas City Royals	56	106	.346	33
Oakland Athletics	50	112	.309	39

=== Record vs. opponents ===
==== Record vs. American League ====
2023 American League record Source: MLB Standings Grid – 2023
Team	BAL	BOS	CWS	CLE	DET	HOU	KC	LAA	MIN	NYY	OAK	SEA	TB	TEX	TOR	NL
Baltimore	—	7–6	4–2	3–4	6–1	3–3	5–1	5–2	4–2	7–6	6–1	4–2	8–5	3–3	10–3	26–20
Boston	6–7	—	2–4	3–3	5–1	2–5	5–2	3–4	4–3	9–4	4–2	3–3	2–11	3–3	7–6	20–26
Chicago	2–4	4–2	—	8–5	5–8	3–4	6–7	3–4	4–9	4–2	3–4	2–4	1–6	1–5	0–6	15–31
Cleveland	4–3	3–3	5–8	—	4–9	2–4	7–6	3–4	7–6	2–4	5–1	4–3	3–3	3–3	4–3	20–26
Detroit	1–6	1–5	8–5	9–4	—	3–3	10–3	3–3	8–5	2–5	3–4	3–3	1–5	3–4	2–4	21–25
Houston	3–3	5–2	4–3	4–2	3–3	—	1–5	9–4	2–4	2–5	10–3	4–9	3–3	9–4	3–4	28–18
Kansas City	1–5	2–5	7–6	6–7	3–10	5–1	—	2–4	4–9	2–4	2–4	1–6	3–4	1–5	1–6	16–30
Los Angeles	2–5	4–3	4–3	4–3	3–3	4–9	4–2	—	3–3	4–2	7–6	5–8	2–4	6–7	2–4	19–27
Minnesota	2–4	3–4	9–4	6–7	5–8	4–2	9–4	3–3	—	4–3	5–1	3–4	1–5	5–2	3–3	25–21
New York	6–7	4–9	2–4	4–2	5–2	5–2	4–2	2–4	3–4	—	5–1	4–2	5–8	3–4	7–6	23–23
Oakland	1–6	2–4	4–3	1–5	4–3	3–10	4–2	6–7	1–5	1–5	—	1–12	2–5	4–9	2–4	14–32
Seattle	2–4	3–3	4–2	3–4	3–3	9–4	6–1	8–5	4–3	2–4	12–1	—	3–4	4–9	3–3	22–24
Tampa Bay	5–8	11–2	6–1	3–3	5–1	3–3	4–3	4–2	5–1	8–5	5–2	4–3	—	2–4	7–6	27–19
Texas	3–3	3–3	5–1	3–3	4–3	4–9	5–1	7–6	2–5	4–3	9–4	9–4	4–2	—	6–1	22–24
Toronto	3–10	6–7	6–0	3–4	4–2	4–3	6–1	4–2	3–3	6–7	4–2	3–3	6–7	1–6	—	30–16

Updated with the results of all games through October 1, 2023.

==== Record vs. National League ====
2023 American League record vs. National League Source: MLB Standings
Team	ARI	ATL	CHC	CIN	COL	LAD	MIA	MIL	NYM	PHI	PIT	SD	SF	STL	WSH
Baltimore	2–1	1–2	1–2	1–2	2–1	1–2	3–0	1–2	3–0	1–2	2–1	1–2	2–1	1–2	4–0
Boston	2–1	3–1	2–1	1–2	1–2	1–2	0–3	2–1	2–1	2–1	0–3	2–1	1–2	0–3	1–2
Chicago	1–2	2–1	1–3	2–1	1–2	1–2	1–2	0–3	1–2	1–2	1–2	0–3	1–2	1–2	1–2
Cleveland	1–2	1–2	2–1	2–2	1–2	1–2	1–2	1–2	0–3	2–1	2–1	1–2	1–2	2–1	2–1
Detroit	0–3	1–2	1–2	1–2	2–1	1–2	1–2	2–1	3–0	0–3	2–2	1–2	3–0	2–1	1–2
Houston	3–0	3–0	3–0	0–3	3–1	1–2	2–1	1–2	2–1	1–2	2–1	2–1	1–2	2–1	2–1
Kansas City	1–2	0–3	1–2	0–3	1–2	2–1	0–3	0–3	3–0	1–2	0–3	2–1	2–1	2–2	1–2
Los Angeles	1–2	1–2	3–0	0–3	1–2	0–4	0–3	1–2	2–1	1–2	2–1	0–3	2–1	3–0	2–1
Minnesota	3–0	0–3	2–1	2–1	2–1	1–2	1–2	2–2	2–1	2–1	2–1	2–1	1–2	2–1	1–2
New York	2–1	0–3	1–2	3–0	1–2	2–1	1–2	1–2	2–2	2–1	2–1	2–1	2–1	1–2	1–2
Oakland	1–2	2–1	0–3	1–2	2–1	0–3	0–3	3–0	0–3	0–3	2–1	0–3	2–2	1–2	0–3
Seattle	2–1	1–2	1–2	1–2	3–0	0–3	2–1	0–3	1–2	1–2	2–1	3–1	2–1	2–1	1–2
Tampa Bay	2–1	1–2	1–2	2–1	3–0	2–1	3–1	2–1	1–2	0–3	3–0	1–2	2–1	1–2	3–0
Texas	1–3	1–2	1–2	0–3	3–0	1–2	3–0	0–3	2–1	3–0	2–1	0–3	2–1	2–1	1–2
Toronto	3–0	3–0	1–2	2–1	2–1	2–1	2–1	2–1	3–0	1–3	3–0	1–2	2–1	1–2	2–1

Updated with the results of all games through October 1, 2023.

=== Game log ===
Legend
	White Sox win
	White Sox loss
	Postponement
	Eliminated from playoff race
**Bold**	White Sox team member

2023 regular season game log: 61–101 (Home: 31–50; Away: 30–51)
March/April: 8–21 (Home: 4–9; Away: 4–12)

#	Date	Opponent	Time (CT)	Score	Win	Loss	Save	Attendance	Record	Streak
1	March 30	@ Astros	6:08 pm	3–2	**Graveman** (1–0)	Pressly (0–1)	**López** (1)	43,032	1–0	W1
2	March 31	@ Astros	7:10 pm	3–6	Martinez (1–0)	**Graveman** (1–1)	Montero (1)	41,453	1–1	L1
3	April 1	@ Astros	1:10 pm	4–6	Stanek (1–0)	**Kelly** (0–1)	Neris (1)	37,519	1–2	L2
4	April 2	@ Astros	1:10 pm	6–3	**Clevinger** (1–0)	García (0–1)	—	42,835	2–2	W1
5	April 3	Giants	2:10 pm	3–12	DeSclafani (1–0)	**Kopech** (0–1)	—	34,784	2–3	L1
6	April 5	Giants	1:10 pm	7–3	**Cease** (1–0)	Webb (0–2)	—	15,980	3–3	W1
7	April 6	Giants	1:10 pm	6–16	Junis (2–0)	**Lynn** (0–1)	—	18,261	3–4	L1
8	April 7	@ Pirates	3:12 pm	9–13	Moreta (1–0)	**Diekman** (0–1)	Crowe (1)	39,167	3–5	L2
9	April 8	@ Pirates	5:35 pm	11–5	**Clevinger** (2–0)	Velasquez (0–2)	—	21,162	4–5	W1
10	April 9	@ Pirates	12:35 pm	0–1	Oviedo (1–0)	**Kopech** (0–2)	Bednar (4)	10,571	4–6	L1
11	April 10	@ Twins	1:10 pm	4–3	**Cease** (2–0)	Maeda (0–2)	**López** (2)	12,078	5–6	W1
12	April 11	@ Twins	6:40 pm	3–4 (10)	Jax (1–1)	**Scholtens** (0–1)	—	16,153	5–7	L1
13	April 12	@ Twins	12:10 pm	1–3	Gray (2–0)	**Giolito** (0–1)	Durán (3)	17,658	5–8	L2
14	April 14	Orioles	6:10 pm	3–6	Baumann (1–0)	**López** (0–1)	Bautista (4)	18,941	5–9	L3
15	April 15	Orioles	1:10 pm	7–6 (10)	**Lambert** (1–0)	Gillaspie (0–1)	—	32,091	6–9	W1
16	April 16	Orioles	1:10 pm	4–8	Baumann (2–0)	**Bummer** (0–1)	—	13,794	6–10	L1
—	April 17	Phillies	Postponed (inclement weather); Makeup: April 18 as a straight doubleheader							
17	April 18 (1)	Phillies	3:10 pm	4–7	Wheeler (1–1)	**Lynn** (0–2)	Alvarado (1)	see 2nd game	6–11	L2
18	April 18 (2)	Phillies	6:10 pm	3–0	**Giolito** (1–1)	Falter (0–3)	**López** (3)	12,542	7–11	W1
19	April 19	Phillies	1:10 pm	2–5	Walker (2–1)	**Clevinger** (2–1)	Alvarado (2)	10,149	7–12	L1
20	April 21	@ Rays	5:40 pm	7–8	Kelly (2–0)	**López** (0–2)	—	17,973	7–13	L2
21	April 22	@ Rays	3:05 pm	3–4 (10)	Cleavinger (1–0)	**Lambert** (1–1)	—	22,333	7–14	L3
22	April 23	@ Rays	12:40 pm	1–4	Eflin (3–0)	**Giolito** (1–2)	Fairbanks (3)	22,702	7–15	L4
23	April 24	@ Blue Jays	6:07 pm	2–5	Bassitt (3–2)	**Lynn** (0–3)	Romano (8)	26,293	7–16	L5
24	April 25	@ Blue Jays	6:07 pm	0–7	Berríos (2–3)	**Clevinger** (2–2)	—	28,917	7–17	L6
25	April 26	@ Blue Jays	12:07 pm	0–8	Kikuchi (4–0)	**Kopech** (0–3)	—	35,069	7–18	L7
26	April 27	Rays	6:10 pm	5–14	McClanahan (5–0)	**Cease** (2–1)	—	11,060	7–19	L8
27	April 28	Rays	6:10 pm	2–3	Poche (2–0)	**Graveman** (1–2)	Kelly (1)	16,681	7–20	L9
28	April 29	Rays	6:10 pm	3–12	Chirinos (1–0)	**Lynn** (0–4)	—	28,462	7–21	L10
29	April 30	Rays	1:10 pm	12–9	**Bummer** (1–1)	Beeks (0–2)	—	17,049	8–21	W1

May: 15–14 (Home: 9–6; Away: 6–8)

#	Date	Opponent	Time (CT)	Score	Win	Loss	Save	Attendance	Record	Streak
30	May 2	Twins	6:10 pm	3–2 (10)	**Lambert** (2–1)	Thielbar (0–1)	—	13,094	9–21	W2
31	May 3	Twins	6:10 pm	6–4	**Santos** (1–0)	Jax (1–3)	**Middleton** (1)	11,468	10–21	W3
32	May 4	Twins	1:10 pm	3–7 (12)	Pagán (2–0)	**Colomé** (0–1)	—	14,650	10–22	L1
33	May 5	@ Reds	5:40 pm	5–4	**Lynn** (1–4)	Greene (0–2)	**López** (4)	23,467	11–22	W1
34	May 6	@ Reds	5:40 pm	3–5	Law (2–4)	**Clevinger** (2–3)	Díaz (6)	25,543	11–23	L1
35	May 7	@ Reds	3:10 pm	17–4	**Kopech** (1–3)	Ashcraft (2–1)	—	20,338	12–23	W1
36	May 8	@ Royals	6:40 pm	5–12	Cuas (2–0)	**Cease** (2–2)	—	9,814	12–24	L1
37	May 9	@ Royals	6:40 pm	4–2	**Giolito** (2–2)	Lyles (0–6)	**Graveman** (1)	11,258	13–24	W1
38	May 10	@ Royals	6:40 pm	1–9	Keller (3–3)	**Lynn** (1–5)	—	12,187	13–25	L1
39	May 11	@ Royals	1:10 pm	3–4	Barlow (1–2)	**López** (0–3)	—	20,321	13–26	L2
40	May 12	Astros	7:10 pm	1–5	France (1–0)	**Kopech** (1–4)	—	18,673	13–27	L3
41	May 13	Astros	6:15 pm	3–1	**Kelly** (3–1)	Montero (0–3)	**Graveman** (2)	23,242	14–27	W1
42	May 14	Astros	1:10 pm	3–4	Brown (4–1)	**Giolito** (2–3)	Pressly (7)	18,347	14–28	L1
43	May 16	Guardians	7:10 pm	8–3	**Lynn** (2–5)	Bieber (3–2)	—	18,459	15–28	W1
44	May 17	Guardians	7:10 pm	7–2	**Clevinger** (3–3)	Battenfield (0–5)	—	12,241	16–28	W2
45	May 18	Guardians	1:10 pm	1–3	Sandlin (2–1)	**Cease** (2–3)	Clase (15)	11,900	16–29	L1
46	May 19	Royals	7:10 pm	2–0	**Kopech** (2–4)	Greinke (1–5)	**Graveman** (3)	20,329	17–29	W1
47	May 20	Royals	1:10 pm	5–1	**Giolito** (3–3)	Lyles (0–8)	—	23,984	18–29	W2
48	May 21	Royals	1:10 pm	5–2	**Lynn** (3–5)	Castillo (0–1)	**Kelly** (1)	23,556	19–29	W3
49	May 22	@ Guardians	5:10 pm	0–3	Gaddis (1–1)	**Scholtens** (0–20	Clase (16)	13,878	19–30	L1
50	May 23	@ Guardians	5:10 pm	4–2	**Cease** (3–3)	Allen (1–2)	**Graveman** (4)	14,524	20–30	W1
51	May 24	@ Guardians	12:10 pm	6–0	**Kopech** (3–4)	Quantrill (2–3)	—	17,767	21–30	W2
52	May 25	@ Tigers	5:40 pm	2–7	Faedo (1–2)	**Giolito** (3–4)	—	15,003	21–31	L1
53	May 26	@ Tigers	5:40 pm	12–3	**Lynn** (4–5)	Wentz (1–5)	—	21,701	22–31	W1
54	May 27	@ Tigers	12:10 pm	3–7	Foley (2–1)	**Kelly** (1–2)	—	24,685	22–32	L1
55	May 28	@ Tigers	12:40 pm	5–6 (10)	Lange (3–0)	**López** (0–4)	—	22,644	22–33	L2
56	May 29	Angels	7:10 pm	4–6	Canning (4–2)	**Kopech** (3–5)	Estévez (13)	23,599	22–34	L3
57	May 30	Angels	7:10 pm	7–3	**Giolito** (4–4)	Anderson (2–1)	—	22,135	23–34	W1
58	May 31	Angels	1:10 pm	5–12	Barría (2–2)	**Lynn** (4–6)	Davidson (2)	17,015	23–35	L1

June: 13–13 (Home: 7–5; Away: 6–8)

#	Date	Opponent	Time (CT)	Score	Win	Loss	Save	Attendance	Record	Streak
59	June 2	Tigers	7:10 pm	3–0	**Middleton** (1–0)	Olson (0–1)	**Graveman** (5)	20,229	24–35	W1
60	June 3	Tigers	1:10 pm	2–1 (10)	**López** (1–4)	Cisnero (2–1)	—	24,674	25–35	W2
61	June 4	Tigers	1:10 pm	6–2	**Hendriks** (1–0)	Lange (3–1)	—	23,372	26–35	W3
62	June 6	@ Yankees	6:05 pm	3–2	**Giolito** (5–4)	Schmidt (2–6)	**Hendriks** (1)	38,049	27–35	W4
—	June 7	@ Yankees	Postponed (Air quality/Smoke); Makeup: June 8 as a doubleheader							
63	June 8 (1)	@ Yankees	3:05 pm	6–5	**Santos** (2–0)	King (1–2)	**Graveman** (6)	see 2nd game	28–35	W5
64	June 8 (2)	@ Yankees	6:35 pm	0–3	Vásquez (1–1)	**Clevinger** (3–4)	Holmes (7)	40,659	28–36	L1
65	June 9	Marlins	7:10 pm	2–1	**Hendriks** (2–0)	Floro (3–4)	—	21,033	29–36	W1
66	June 10	Marlins	1:10 pm	1–5	Okert (3–0)	**Kelly** (1–3)	—	25,793	29–37	L1
67	June 11	Marlins	1:10 pm	5–6	Hoeing (1–1)	**Graveman** (1–3)	Puk (7)	20,888	29–38	L2
68	June 13	@ Dodgers	9:10 pm	1–5	Gonsolin (4–1)	**Lynn** (4–7)	—	45,561	29–39	L3
69	June 14	@ Dodgers	9:10 pm	8–4	**López** (2–4)	Vesia (0–3)	—	44,442	30–39	W1
70	June 15	@ Dodgers	9:10 pm	4–5 (11)	Ferguson (4–3)	**Crochet** (0–1)	—	48,655	30–40	L1
71	June 16	@ Mariners	9:10 pm	2–3	Brash (4–3)	**Banks** (0–1)	Sewald (13)	36,061	30–41	L2
72	June 17	@ Mariners	3:10 pm	4–3 (11)	**Bummer** (2–1)	Saucedo (2–1)	**Scholtens** (1)	45,188	31–41	W1
73	June 18	@ Mariners	3:10 pm	1–5	Miller (5–3)	**Lynn** (4–8)	—	44,772	31–42	L1
74	June 19	Rangers	7:10 pm	2–5	Heaney (5–4)	**Banks** (0–2)	Smith (13)	15,554	31–43	L2
75	June 20	Rangers	7:10 pm	7–6	**Graveman** (2–3)	Anderson (1–1)	—	21,048	32–43	W1
76	June 21	Rangers	7:10 pm	3–6	Pérez (7–3)	**Kopech** (3–6)	Smith (14)	18,963	32–44	L1
77	June 23	Red Sox	7:10 pm	1–3	Bello (5–4)	**Giolito** (5–5)	Jansen (16)	27,015	32–45	L2
78	June 24	Red Sox	3:10 pm	5–4	**Graveman** (3–3)	Jansen (2–4)	—	33,054	33–45	W1
79	June 25	Red Sox	1:10 pm	4–1	**Scholtens** (1–2)	Crawford (2–4)	**Middleton** (2)	26,077	34–45	W2
80	June 26	@ Angels	8:38 pm	1–2	Estévez (2–1)	**López** (2–5)	—	28,554	34–46	L1
81	June 27	@ Angels	8:38 pm	2–4	Ohtani (7–3)	**Kopech** (3–7)	Estévez (20)	33,637	34–47	L2
82	June 28	@ Angels	8:38 pm	11–5	**Giolito** (6–5)	Barría (2–3)	—	29,861	35–47	W1
83	June 29	@ Angels	3:07 pm	9–7	**Lynn** (5–8)	Sandoval (4–7)	—	27,630	36–47	W2
84	June 30	@ Athletics	8:40 pm	4–7	Medina (2–7)	**Banks** (0–3)	May (5)	14,181	36–48	L1

July: 7–16 (Home: 3–9; Away: 4–7)

#	Date	Opponent	Time (CT)	Score	Win	Loss	Save	Attendance	Record	Streak
85	July 1	@ Athletics	3:07 pm	6–7 (10)	Fujinami (4–7)	**Graveman** (3–4)	—	9,235	36–49	L2
86	July 2	@ Athletics	3:07 pm	8–7	**Bummer** (3–1)	Blackburn (1–1)	**Santos** (1)	12,107	37–49	W1
87	July 4	Blue Jays	7:10 pm	3–4	Pearson (5–1)	**Kelly** (1–4)	Romano (25)	32,607	37–50	L1
—	July 5	Blue Jays	Postponed (rain); Makeup: July 6 as a doubleheader							
88	July 6 (1)	Blue Jays	4:10 pm	2–6 (11)	Romano (4–4)	**Bummer** (3–2)	García (1)	see 2nd game	37–51	L2
89	July 6 (2)	Blue Jays	8:00 pm	4–5	Jackson (1–0)	**Padilla** (0–1)	Pearson (1)	20,258	37–52	L3
90	July 7	Cardinals	7:10 pm	8–7	**Middleton** (2–0)	Leahy (0–1)	**Graveman** (7)	27,569	38–52	W1
91	July 8	Cardinals	1:10 pm	0–3	Mikolas (5–5)	**Toussaint** (0–2)	Hicks (7)	26,560	38–53	L1
92	July 9	Cardinals	1:10 pm	3–4 (10)	Romero (1–0)	**Middleton** (2–1)	—	29,769	38–54	L2
—	July 11	**93rd All-Star Game in Seattle, WA**								
93	July 14	@ Braves	6:20 pm	0–9	Morton (10–6)	**Kopech** (3–8)	—	42,782	38–55	L3
94	July 15	@ Braves	6:15 pm	6–5	**Lynn** (6–8)	Strider (11–3)	**Graveman** (8)	43,344	39–55	W1
95	July 16	@ Braves	12:30 pm	8–1	**Cease** (4–3)	Allard (0–1)	—	40,174	40–55	W2
96	July 18	@ Mets	6:10 pm	10–11	Hartwig (2–1)	**Giolito** (6–6)	Robertson (13)	37,109	40–56	L1
97	July 19	@ Mets	6:10 pm	1–5	Verlander (4–5)	**Toussaint** (0–3)	—	34,873	40–57	L2
98	July 20	@ Mets	12:10 pm	6–2	**Kopech** (4–8)	Quintana (0–1)	—	34,751	41–57	W1
99	July 21	@ Twins	7:10 pm	4–9	Ryan (9–6)	**Lynn** (6–9)	—	31,339	41–58	L1
100	July 22	@ Twins	6:15 pm	2–3	Balazovic (1–0)	**Middleton** (2–2)	Durán (17)	30,894	41–59	L2
101	July 23	@ Twins	1:10 pm	4–5 (12)	Pagán (5–1)	**Scholtens** (1–3)	—	29,001	41–60	L3
102	July 25	Cubs	7:10 pm	3–7	Hendricks (4–4)	**Kopech** (4–9)	Alzolay (10)	37,079	41–61	L4
103	July 26	Cubs	7:10 pm	7–10	Assad (1–2)	**Kelly** (1–5)	Alzolay (11)	37,214	41–62	L5
104	July 27	Guardians	7:10 pm	3–6	Bibee (7–2)	**Cease** (4–4)	Clase (28)	20,893	41–63	L6
105	July 28	Guardians	6:10 pm	3–0	**Toussaint** (1–3)	Curry (3–1)	**Santos** (2)	26,654	42–63	W1
106	July 29	Guardians	6:10 pm	7–2	**Clevinger** (4–4)	Allen (4–4)	—	26,299	43–63	W2
107	July 30	Guardians	1:10 pm	0–5	Civale (5–2)	**Kopech** (4–10)	—	28,096	43–64	L1

August: 10–17 (Home: 5–8; Away: 5–9)

#	Date	Opponent	Time (CT)	Score	Win	Loss	Save	Attendance	Record	Streak
108	August 1	@ Rangers	7:05 pm	0–2	Heaney (8–6)	**Scholtens** (1–4)	Smith (18)	28,988	43–65	L2
109	August 2	@ Rangers	7:05 pm	1–11	Dunning (9–4)	**Cease** (4–5)	—	28,735	43–66	L3
110	August 3	@ Rangers	1:05 pm	3–5	Scherzer (10–4)	**Toussaint** (1–4)	Smith (19)	29,804	43–67	L4
111	August 4	@ Guardians	6:10 pm	2–4	Allen (5–4)	**Clevinger** (4–5)	Clase (29)	37,056	43–68	L5
112	August 5	@ Guardians	6:10 pm	7–4	**Kopech** (5–10)	Syndergaard (1–5)	—	35,823	44–68	W1
113	August 6	@ Guardians	11:05 am	5–3	**Peralta** (1–0)	Clase (1–6)	**Lambert** (1)	27,305	45–68	W2
114	August 7	Yankees	7:10 pm	5–1	**Cease** (5–5)	Cole (10–3)	**Shaw** (1)	27,574	46–68	W3
115	August 8	Yankees	7:10 pm	1–7	Schmidt (8–6)	**Toussaint** (1–5)	—	26,446	46–69	L1
116	August 9	Yankees	7:10 pm	9–2	**Clevinger** (5–5)	Severino (2–7)	**Santos** (3)	23,377	47–69	W1
117	August 11	Brewers	7:10 pm	6–7 (10)	Williams (7–3)	**Lambert** (2–2)	Uribe (1)	30,059	47–70	L1
118	August 12	Brewers	6:15 pm	2–3	Woodruff (2–1)	**Scholtens** (1–5)	Williams (28)	29,851	47–71	L2
119	August 13	Brewers	1:10 pm	3–7	Peralta (9–8)	**Cease** (5–6)	—	24,495	47–72	L3
120	August 15	@ Cubs	7:05 pm	5–3	**Ramsey** (1–0)	Merryweather (4–1)	**Santos** (4)	40,389	48–72	W1
121	August 16	@ Cubs	7:05 pm	3–4	Smyly (9–8)	**Santos** (2–1)	—	40,869	48–73	L1
122	August 18	@ Rockies	7:40 pm	1–14	Lambert (3–4)	**Kopech** (5–11)	—	35,249	48–74	L2
123	August 19	@ Rockies	7:10 pm	5–11	Freeland (5–13)	**Scholtens** (1–6)	—	46,601	48–75	L3
124	August 20	@ Rockies	2:10 pm	10–5	**Bummer** (4–2)	Koch (2–1)	—	40,151	49–75	W1
125	August 21	Mariners	7:10 pm	2–14	Castillo (10–7)	**Toussaint** (1–6)	—	15,275	49–76	L1
126	August 22	Mariners	7:10 pm	3–6	Topa (3–3)	**Clevinger** (5–6)	Muñoz (8)	16,070	49–77	L2
127	August 23	Mariners	1:10 pm	5–4 (10)	**Peralta** (2–0)	Topa (3–4)	—	15,759	50–77	W1
128	August 24	Athletics	7:10 pm	5–8	Erceg (3–3)	**Lambert** (2–3)	May (14)	13,247	50–78	L1
129	August 25	Athletics	6:10 pm	4–12	Neal (1–0)	**Cease** (5–7)	—	21,906	50–79	L2
130	August 26	Athletics	6:10 pm	6–2	**Toussaint** (2–6)	Sears (2–11)	—	21,508	51–79	W1
131	August 27	Athletics	1:10 pm	6–1	**Clevinger** (6–6)	Blackburn (3–4)	—	20,236	52–79	W2
132	August 28	@ Orioles	6:05 pm	0–9	Rodriguez (4–3)	**Kopech** (5–12)	—	12,325	52–80	L1
133	August 29	@ Orioles	6:05 pm	3–9	Coulombe (4–1)	**Bummer** (4–3)	—	14,903	52–81	L2
134	August 30	@ Orioles	12:05 pm	10–5	**Cease** (6–7)	Gibson (13–8)	—	17,723	53–81	W1

September/October: 8–20 (Home: 3–13; Away: 5–7)

#	Date	Opponent	Time (CT)	Score	Win	Loss	Save	Attendance	Record	Streak
135	September 1	Tigers	7:10 pm	2–4	Rodríguez (10–7)	**Toussaint** (2–7)	Lange (20)	15,105	53–82	L1
136	September 2	Tigers	6:10 pm	0–10	Olson (3–6)	**Clevinger** (6–7)	—	21,186	53–83	L2
137	September 3	Tigers	1:10 pm	2–3	Skubal (4–3)	**Bummer** (4–4)	Lange (21)	22,246	53–84	L3
138	September 4	@ Royals	1:10 pm	1–12	Ragans (6–4)	**Scholtens** (1–7)	—	10,646	53–85	L4
139	September 5	@ Royals	6:40pm	6–7	Kowar (1–0)	**Santos** (2–2)	—	10,395	53–86	L5
140	September 6	@ Royals	1:10 pm	6–4	**Toussaint** (3–7)	Lyles (4–16)	**Shaw** (2)	11,046	54–86	W1
141	September 8	@ Tigers	5:40 pm	6–0	**Clevinger** (7–7)	Olson (3–7)	—	18,483	55–86	W2
142	September 9	@ Tigers	5:10 pm	1–3	Skubal (5–3)	**Ureña** (0–5)	Lange (22)	20,159	55–87	L1
143	September 10	@ Tigers	12:10pm	2–3	Gipson-Long (1–0)	**Scholtens** (1–8)	Lange (23)	18,223	55–88	L2
—	September 11	Royals	6:40 pm	Postponed (rain); Makeup: September 12 as a doubleheader						
144	September 12 (1)	Royals	3:40 pm	6–2	**Cease** (7–7)	Singer (8–11)	**Santos** (5)	see 2nd game	56–88	W1
145	September 12 (2)	Royals	6:55 pm	10–11	Clarke (3–5)	**García** (0–1)	Hernández (4)	14,824	56–89	L1
146	September 13	Royals	6:40 pm	1–7	Marsh (1–8)	**Clevinger** (7–8)	—	15,593	56–90	L2
147	September 14	Twins	6:10 pm	2–10	Maeda (5–7)	**Ureña** (0–6)	—	13,233	56–91	L3
148	September 15	Twins	6:40 pm	2–10	Ober (7–6)	**Scholtens** (1–9)	—	18,001	56–92	L4
149	September 16	Twins	6:10 pm	7–6	**Toussaint** (4–7)	López (10–8)	**Banks** (1)	24,964	57–92	W1
150	September 17	Twins	1:10 pm	0–4	Gray (8–7)	**Cease** (7–8)	—	17,641	57–93	L1
151	September 18	@ Nationals	6:05 pm	6–1	**Clevinger** (8–8)	Adon (2–3)	—	20,977	58–93	W1
152	September 19	@ Nationals	6:05 pm	3–4	Garcia (2–2)	**Bummer** (4–5)	Finnegan (26)	23,936	58–94	L1
153	September 20	@ Nationals	12:05 pm	3–13	Gray (8–12)	**Banks** (0–4)	—	23,275	58–95	L2
154	September 22	@ Red Sox	6:10 pm	2–3	Llovera (2–3)	**Crochet** (0–2)	Martin (3)	37,102	58–96	L3
155	September 23	@ Red Sox	3:10 pm	1–0	**Bummer** (5–5)	Winckowski (4–3)	**Shaw** (3)	33,392	59–96	W1
156	September 24	@ Red Sox	12:35 pm	3–2 (6)	**Clevinger** (9–8)	Crawford (6–8)	—	33,399	60–96	W2
—	September 25	Diamondbacks	6:40 pm	Rescheduled (effects of Tropical Storm Ophelia along the East Coast); Rescheduled to September 28						
157	September 26	Diamondbacks	6:40 pm	4–15	Nelson (8–8)	**Ureña** (0–7)	—	14,339	60–97	L1
158	September 27	Diamondbacks	1:10 pm	0–3	Pfaadt (3–9)	**Patiño** (0–1)	Sewald (34)	14,790	60–98	L2
159	September 28	Diamondbacks	1:10 pm	3–1	**Banks** (1–4)	Jarvis (2–1)	**Shaw** (4)	23,522	61–98	W1
160	September 29	Padres	6:40 pm	2–3	Martinez (6–4)	**Cease** (7–9)	Hader (33)	20,491	61–99	L1
161	September 30	Padres	6:10 pm	1–6	Wacha (14–4)	**Clevinger** (9–9)	—	30,118	61–100	L2
162	October 1	Padres	2:10 pm	1–2 (11)	Hill (8–14)	**Cronin** (0–1)	—	20,588	61–101	L3

== Roster ==
2023 Chicago White Sox
Roster
Pitchers: 57 Tanner Banks; 39 Aaron Bummer; 84 Dylan Cease; 52 Mike Clevinger; 48 Alex Colomé; 45 Garrett Crochet; 59 Declan Cronin; 55 Jake Diekman; 64 Deivi García; 27 Lucas Giolito; 49 Kendall Graveman; 31 Liam Hendriks; 46 Brent Honeywell Jr.; 17 Joe Kelly; 34 Michael Kopech; 58 Jimmy Lambert; 40 Reynaldo López; 33 Lance Lynn; 99 Kenyan Middleton; 66 Edgar Navarro; 61 Nicholas Padilla; 77 Luis Patiño; 67 Sammy Peralta; 48 Yohan Ramírez; 68 Lane Ramsey; 66 José Ruiz; 60 Gregory Santos; 62 Jesse Scholtens; 41 Bryan Shaw; 47 Touki Toussaint; 54 José Ureña	Catchers: 24 Yasmani Grandal; 26 Korey Lee; 36 Carlos Pérez; 44 Seby Zavala; Infielders: 26 Hanser Alberto; 7 Tim Anderson; 1 Elvis Andrus; 30 Jake Burger; 12 Romy González; 10 Yoán Moncada; 28 Zach Remillard; 55 José Rodríguez; 50 Lenyn Sosa; 25 Andrew Vaughn	Outfielders: 23 Andrew Benintendi; 22 Oscar Colás; 15 Clint Frazier; 0 Billy Hamilton; 51 Adam Haseley; 74 Eloy Jiménez; 41 Jake Marisnick; 46 Tyler Naquin; 88 Luis Robert; 32 Gavin Sheets; 43 Trayce Thompson	Manager: 5 Pedro Grifol; Coaches: 8 Daryl Boston (first base/outfield); 20 José Castro (hitting); 98 Miguel González (bullpen catcher); 29 Curt Hasler (bullpen); 38 Chris Johnson (assistant hitting); 21 Ethan Katz (pitching); 75 Charlie Montoyo (bench/baserunning); 18 Eddie Rodríguez (third base); 96 Luis Sierra (bullpen catcher); 37 Mike Tosar (field coordinator)

== Player statistics ==
= Indicates team leader

= Indicates league leader

=== Batting ===
Note: G = Games played; AB = At bats; R = Runs; H = Hits; 2B = Doubles; 3B = Triples; HR = Home runs; RBI = Runs batted in; SB = Stolen bases; BB = Walks; AVG = Batting average; SLG = Slugging average

Player	G	AB	R	H	2B	3B	HR	RBI	SB	BB	AVG	SLG
Andrew Vaughn	152	566	67	146	30	2	21	80	0	36	.258	.429
Andrew Benintendi	151	562	72	147	34	2	5	45	13	52	.262	.356
Luis Robert Jr.	145	546	90	144	36	1	38	80	20	30	.264	.542
Tim Anderson	123	493	52	121	18	2	1	25	13	26	.245	.296
Eloy Jiménez	120	456	50	124	23	0	18	64	0	30	.272	.441
Elvis Andrus	112	374	39	94	20	1	6	44	12	25	.251	.358
Yasmani Grandal	118	363	33	85	14	0	8	33	0	36	.234	.339
Yoán Moncada	92	334	39	87	20	1	11	40	1	20	.260	.425
Gavin Sheets	118	311	24	63	10	0	10	43	1	28	.203	.331
Jake Burger	88	294	44	63	15	1	25	52	1	22	.214	.527
Oscar Colás	75	245	32	53	9	0	5	19	4	12	.216	.314
Lenyn Sosa	52	164	12	33	6	0	6	14	0	5	.201	.348
Seby Zavala	66	161	15	25	3	0	7	16	1	10	.155	.304
Zach Remillard	54	147	16	37	7	0	1	18	4	8	.252	.320
Romy González	44	93	11	18	4	2	3	14	7	2	.194	.376
Trayce Thompson	36	82	5	14	2	0	1	3	2	9	.171	.232
Hanser Alberto	30	82	11	18	5	0	3	16	0	4	.220	.390
Clint Frazier	33	66	10	13	1	1	0	3	4	10	.197	.242
Korey Lee	24	65	4	5	1	0	1	3	0	5	.077	.138
Carlos Pérez	27	49	5	10	4	0	1	3	0	4	.204	.347
Adam Haseley	28	36	6	8	2	0	0	2	1	3	.222	.278
Tyler Naquin	5	8	0	0	0	0	0	0	0	0	.000	.000
Jake Marisnick	9	2	1	0	0	0	0	0	0	0	.000	.000
Billy Hamilton	3	2	2	0	0	0	0	0	2	0	.000	.000
José Rodríguez	1	0	1	0	0	0	0	0	0	0	.---	.---
Totals	162	5501	641	1308	264	13	171	617	86	377	.238	.384
Rank in AL	—	7	14	12	9	14	11	14	11	15	12	12

Source:Baseball Reference

=== Pitching ===
Note: W = Wins; L = Losses; ERA = Earned run average; G = Games pitched; GS = Games started; SV = Saves; IP = Innings pitched; H = Hits allowed; R = Runs allowed; ER = Earned runs allowed; BB = Walks allowed; SO = Strikeouts

Player	W	L	ERA	G	GS	SV	IP	H	R	ER	BB	SO
Dylan Cease	7	9	4.58	33	33	0	177.0	172	98	90	79	214
Mike Clevinger	9	9	3.77	24	24	0	131.1	121	56	55	40	110
Michael Kopech	5	12	5.43	30	27	0	129.1	115	80	78	91	134
Lucas Giolito	6	6	3.79	21	21	0	121.0	106	55	51	42	131
Lance Lynn	6	9	6.47	21	21	0	119.2	130	94	86	45	144
Jesse Scholtens	1	9	5.29	26	11	1	85.0	100	54	50	30	58
Touki Toussaint	4	6	4.97	19	15	0	83.1	66	46	46	52	83
Gregory Santos	2	2	3.39	60	0	5	66.1	69	29	25	17	66
Tanner Banks	1	4	4.43	32	3	1	61.0	59	32	30	16	51
Aaron Bummer	5	5	6.79	61	0	0	58.1	53	45	44	36	78
Bryan Shaw	0	0	4.14	38	0	4	45.2	39	21	21	17	40
Kendall Graveman	3	4	3.48	45	0	8	44.0	33	20	17	20	42
Reynaldo López	2	5	4.29	43	0	4	42.0	33	21	20	22	52
Jimmy Lambert	2	3	5.26	35	1	1	37.2	41	26	22	20	41
Keynan Middleton	2	2	3.96	39	0	2	36.1	33	17	16	16	47
Joe Kelly	1	5	4.97	31	0	1	29.0	26	19	16	12	41
José Ureña	0	3	4.10	5	5	0	26.1	23	15	12	8	20
Lane Ramsey	1	0	5.85	21	0	0	20.0	25	13	13	9	18
Sammy Peralta	2	0	4.05	16	0	0	20.0	19	11	9	11	18
Luis Patiño	0	1	3.57	7	1	0	17.2	16	8	7	12	13
Garrett Crochet	0	2	3.55	13	0	0	12.2	12	6	5	13	12
Jake Diekman	0	1	7.94	13	0	0	11.1	11	14	10	13	11
Declan Cronin	0	1	9.00	9	0	0	11.0	11	12	11	7	8
Deivi García	0	1	2.89	6	0	0	9.1	5	8	3	8	7
Edgar Navarro	0	0	7.27	8	0	0	8.2	11	7	7	2	9
Brent Honeywell Jr.	0	0	11.12	4	0	0	5.2	9	7	7	3	3
Liam Hendriks	2	0	5.40	5	0	1	5.0	4	3	3	1	3
Nicholas Padilla	0	1	5.79	3	0	0	4.2	9	3	3	1	6
Yohan Ramírez	0	0	9.00	5	0	0	4.0	5	4	4	3	4
José Ruiz	0	0	22.09	4	0	0	3.2	8	9	9	4	3
Alex Colomé	0	1	6.00	4	0	0	3.0	2	4	2	3	2
Hanser Alberto	0	0	21.60	2	0	0	1.2	6	4	4	1	1
Totals	61	101	4.87	162	162	28	1431.2	1372	841	774	654	1470
Rank in AL	13	3	13	—	—	14	11	11	13	13	14	4

Source:Baseball Reference

== Farm system ==
Level	Team	League	Manager
AAA	Charlotte Knights	International League	Justin Jirschele
AA	Birmingham Barons	Southern League	Lorenzo Bundy
High-A	Winston-Salem Dash	South Atlantic League	Guillermo Quiróz
A	Kannapolis Cannon Ballers	Carolina League	Pat Leyland
Rookie	ACL White Sox	Arizona Complex League	Danny Gonzalez
Rookie	DSL White Sox	Dominican Summer League	Anthony Nunez
