= Edgar Navarro =

Edgar Navarro may refer to:

- Édgar Navarro (Paralympian)
- Edgar Navarro (baseball)
