= José Rodríguez (infielder, born 2001) =

Dominican baseball player (born 2001)

Tecolotes de los Dos Laredos – No. 3
- Infielder
- Born: May 13, 2001 (age 25); Valverde, Dominican Republic
- Bats: Right Throws: Right

MLB debut
- June 20, 2023, for the Chicago White Sox

MLB statistics (through 2023 season)
- Batting average: .000
- Home runs: 0
- Runs batted in: 0
- Stats at Baseball Reference

Teams
- Chicago White Sox (2023)

José Augusto Rodríguez (born May 13, 2001) is a Dominican professional baseball infielder for the Tecolotes de los Dos Laredos of the Mexican League. He has previously played in one Major League Baseball (MLB) game for the Chicago White Sox.

== Career ==
=== Chicago White Sox ===
Rodríguez signed with the Chicago White Sox as an international free agent on February 13, 2018. He made his professional debut that season with the Dominican Summer League White Sox, hitting .291 with two home runs, 23 RBI, and 16 stolen bases across 60 games. Rodríguez spent the 2019 season with the rookie-level Arizona League White Sox, where he slashed .293/.328/.505 with nine home runs, 31 RBI, and seven stolen bases.

Rodríguez did not play in a game in 2020 due to the cancellation of the minor league season because of the COVID-19 pandemic. He returned in 2021 to play for the Kannapolis Cannon Ballers, Winston-Salem Dash and Birmingham Barons. After the season he played in the Arizona Fall League. Rodríguez returned to Birmingham in 2022, playing in 104 games and batting .280/.340/.430 with 11 home runs, 68 RBI, and 40 stolen bases.

On November 15, 2022, the White Sox added Rodríguez to their 40-man roster to protect him from the Rule 5 draft. Rodríguez was optioned to Double-A Birmingham to begin the 2023 season. In 44 games, he batted .238/.274/.429 with 9 home runs, 25 RBI, and 9 stolen bases. On June 19, Rodríguez was promoted to the major leagues for the first time. He made his major league debut on June 20 as a pinch-runner, scoring a game-winning run in the only MLB game he played that season. The White Sox recalled him on September 1, but he did not appear in another game.

Rodríguez was optioned to the Triple-A Charlotte Knights to begin the 2024 season. On April 4, Rodríguez was designated for assignment by Chicago, opening a roster spot for Mike Clevinger.

=== Philadelphia Phillies ===
On April 5, 2024, Rodríguez was traded to the Philadelphia Phillies in exchange for cash. In 38 games for the Double-A Reading Fightin Phils, he batted .265/.329/.422 with four home runs, 18 RBI, and 12 stolen bases. On June 4, Rodríguez was suspended for one year by MLB for violating the league's sports betting policy. He had bet $749 on baseball games while in the minors in 2021 and 2022.

On June 5, 2025, Rodríguez was reinstated from the restricted list; however he was subsequently non-tendered by the Phillies and became a free agent. He re-signed with the Phillies on a minor league contract the next day. He made 41 appearances down the stretch split between the Single-A Clearwater Threshers, High-A Jersey Shore BlueClaws, and Double-A Reading, batting a cumulative .297/.327/.361 with one home run, 18 RBI, and six stolen bases.

Rodríguez was released by the Phillies on May 4, 2026, having not appeared in any games during the season.

=== Tecolotes de los Dos Laredos ===
On June 16, 2026, Rodríguez signed with the Tecolotes de los Dos Laredos of the Mexican League.
