= Tyler Ivey =

American baseball player (born 1996)

Dorados de Chihuahua
- Pitcher
- Born: May 12, 1996 (age 30); Rowlett, Texas, U.S.
- Bats: Right Throws: Right

MLB debut
- May 21, 2021, for the Houston Astros

MLB statistics (through 2021 season)
- Win–loss record: 0–0
- Earned run average: 7.71
- Strikeouts: 3
- Stats at Baseball Reference

Teams
- Houston Astros (2021)

Tyler Cade Ivey (born May 12, 1996) is an American professional baseball pitcher for the Dorados de Chihuahua of the Mexican League. He has previously played in Major League Baseball (MLB) for the Houston Astros. He played college baseball for Texas A&M University, and was drafted out of Grayson College.

== Amateur career ==
Ivey attended Rockwall-Heath High School in Heath, Texas. As a freshman, he was on the 2012 4-A State Champion Rockwall-Heath baseball team that also included future major league pitcher Jake Thompson. Ivey was undrafted out of high school in 2015 and enrolled at Texas A&M University to play college baseball for the Aggies. He posted a 2–3 record with a 3.56 ERA in 43 innings over 11 games during the 2016 season. During that season, he was involved in an incident that almost caused a post-game brawl vs. the University of Texas, when he taunted the UT dugout with a horns down gesture. Ivey transferred to Grayson College in Denison, Texas for his sophomore season of 2017. With Grayson, Ivey posted a 9–0 record with a 2.08 ERA in 78 innings over 12 games.

== Professional career ==
=== Houston Astros ===
Ivey was drafted by the Houston Astros in the 3rd round, with the 91st overall selection, of the 2017 MLB draft and signed with them for a $450,000 signing bonus.

Ivey split the 2017 season between the rookie-level Gulf Coast League Astros and the Tri City ValleyCats of the Low-A New York–Penn League, posting a combined 0–3 record with a 5.63 ERA in 38 innings. He split the 2018 season between the Quad Cities River Bandits of the Single-A Midwest League and the Buies Creek Astros of the High-A Carolina League, posting a combined 4–6 record with a 2.97 ERA and 135 strikeouts over 112 innings. Ivey split the 2019 season between the GCL Astros, Fayetteville Woodpeckers, and Corpus Christi Hooks of the Double-A Texas League, going a combined 4–0 with a 1.38 ERA and 68 strikeouts over 52 innings.

Ivey did not play in a game in 2020 due to the cancellation of the minor league season because of the COVID-19 pandemic. On November 20, 2020, the Astros added Ivey to their 40-man roster to protect him from the Rule 5 draft.

On May 21, 2021, Ivey was promoted to the major leagues for the first time. He made his debut that day as the starting pitcher against the Texas Rangers, drawing a no-decision while allowing 4 runs in 4 2/3 innings of work. On June 12, Ivey revealed that he had been pitching through elbow pain since suffering a grade one UCL strain in 2019 and that he would not pitch again in 2021. He stated “apparently I have the nerve endings of a 75-year old man in my elbow. That probably explains a lot”. Ivey was designated for assignment on April 7, 2022. On April 11, he cleared waivers and was sent outright to the Triple-A Sugar Land Space Cowboys.

Ivey retired from professional baseball in May 2022, citing "burnout" as a reason behind the decision. He briefly became a salesman before deciding to return to the Astros organization for spring training in 2025. Ivey was assigned to Triple-A Sugar Land to begin the season. In 27 appearances (25 starts) for the Space Cowboys, he compiled a 4-10 record and 5.83 ERA with 102 strikeouts over 122 innings of work. Ivey elected free agency following the season on November 6, 2025.

=== Tecolotes de los Dos Laredos ===
On January 26, 2026, Ivey signed with the Tecolotes de los Dos Laredos of the Mexican League. Ivey made 18 appearances (including 17 starts) for Dos Laredos, compiling a 5–7 record and 5.74 ERA with 85 strikeouts across 78 1/3 innings pitched.

=== Fubon Guardians ===
On August 21, 2026, Ivey signed with the Fubon Guardians of the Chinese Professional Baseball League. He was released on August 31, after making no appearance on the major league roster.

=== Dorados de Chihuahua ===
On November 10, 2026, Ivey was traded by the Laredos to the Dorados de Chihuahua of the Mexican League in exchange for Edgar Navarro.
