= J. P. France =

American baseball player (born 1995)

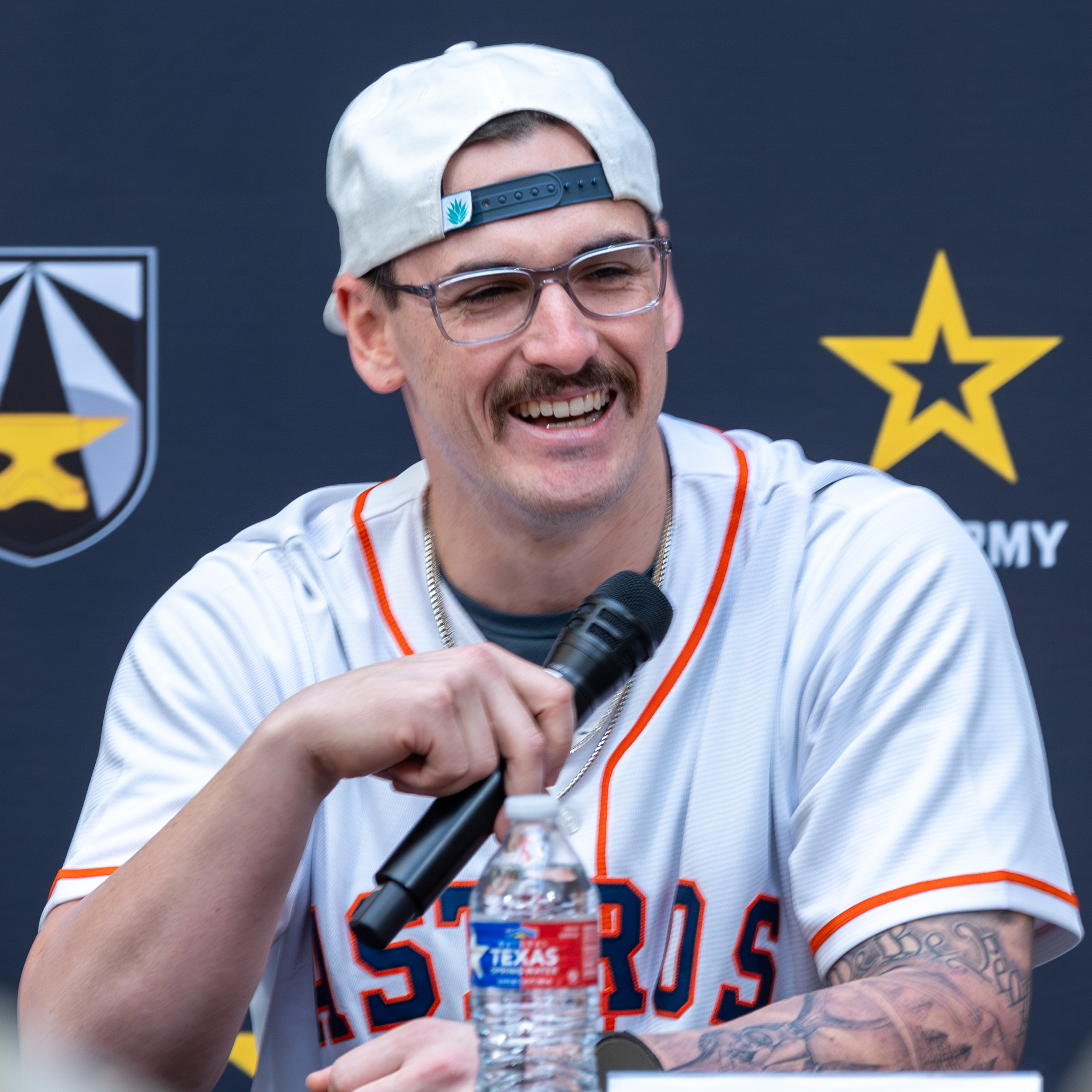
- France with the Houston Astros in 2024

Free agent
- Pitcher
- Born: April 4, 1995 (age 31); New Orleans, Louisiana, U.S.
- Bats: Right Throws: Right

MLB debut
- May 6, 2023, for the Houston Astros

MLB statistics (through 2026 season)
- Win–loss record: 12–9
- Earned run average: 4.49
- Strikeouts: 132
- Stats at Baseball Reference

Teams
- Houston Astros (2023–2026)

Jonathan Patrick France (born April 4, 1995) is an American professional baseball pitcher who is a free agent. France was selected in the 14th round of the 2018 MLB draft by the Houston Astros, and made his MLB debut in 2023.

== Amateur career ==
J. P. France grew up in Luling, Louisiana, and attended Archbishop Shaw High School.

France enrolled at Tulane University, where he played college baseball for the Green Wave. He missed his sophomore season while recovering from Tommy John surgery and used a medical redshirt. As a redshirt junior, France produced a 5–5 win–loss record (W–L) with a 3.84 earned run average (ERA) and 73 strikeouts over 96 innings pitched (IP), and 13–12 W–L, 4.01 ERA in his career overall with the Green Wave. After the season, he transferred to Mississippi State University (MSU) to play for the Bulldogs in his final year of eligibility.

== Professional career ==
=== Houston Astros ===
==== Minor leagues ====
France was drafted by the Houston Astros in the 14th round, with the 432nd overall selection, of the 2018 Major League Baseball draft. After signing with the team he was assigned to the Tri-City ValleyCats of the New York–Penn League and was moved to the bullpen and was later promoted to the Single-A Quad Cities River Bandits. France spent the 2019 season with the Fayetteville Woodpeckers of the High-A Carolina League, where he was used primarily as a starting pitcher. He did not play in a game in 2020 due to the cancellation of the minor league season because of the COVID-19 pandemic.

He was assigned to the Double-A Corpus Christi Hooks prior to the start of the 2021 season before being promoted to the Triple-A Sugar Land Skeeters. In 2022, France spent the year with the Triple–A Sugar Land Space Cowboys. In 34 appearances (15 starts), he registered a 3–4 record and 3.90 ERA with 136 strikeouts and 3 saves in 110 2/3 innings pitched. On November 15, 2022, the Astros added France to their 40-man roster to protect him from the Rule 5 draft.

France was optioned to the Triple-A Sugar Land to begin the 2023 season. In 5 appearances (3 starts) for Sugar Land, he logged a 2–1 record and 2.33 ERA with 26 strikeouts in 19 1/3 innings pitched.

==== Major leagues ====
On May 5, 2023, the Astros announced that France would be promoted to the major leagues for the first time. He made his major league debut the next day against the Seattle Mariners. He earned his first major league win on May 12, 2023, versus the Chicago White Sox, yielding one run over 6 2/3 innings. France made his first career relief appearance on August 6, allowing an unearned run in 3 1/2 innings and was the winning pitcher in a 9–7 win over the New York Yankees. He made 24 appearances (23 starts) during his rookie campaign, compiling an 11–6 record and 3.83 ERA with 101 strikeouts across 136 1/3 innings pitched.

France began the 2024 campaign out of Houston's rotation, struggling to a 7.46 ERA with 22 strikeouts in 5 starts. On June 26, 2024, it was announced that France would undergo season–ending shoulder surgery.

On August 21, 2025, France was activated from the injured list to make his season debut and return from surgery. He made two appearances for Houston, recording a 2.25 ERA with one win and five strikeouts over four innings of work.

On January 29, 2026, France was designated for assignment by the Astros following the acquisition of Kai-Wei Teng. He cleared waivers and was sent outright to Triple-A Sugar Land on February 5. France had his contract selected on April 10 after Cristian Javier was placed on the injured list. On April 18, France has been designated for assignment again by the Astros when the team claimed Dustin Harris off waivers. He cleared waivers and was sent outright to Triple-A Sugar Land on April 20. In 29 appearances for the Space Cowboys, France compiled a 1–3 record and 3.72 ERA with 39 strikeouts across 36 1/3 innings pitched. France was released by the Astros organization on July 30.

=== San Diego Padres ===
On August 2, 2026, France signed a minor league contract with the San Diego Padres. He made 10 appearances for the Triple–A El Paso Chihuahuas, struggling to an 0–1 record and 8.44 ERA with nine strikeouts and one save across 10 2/3 innings pitched. France was released by the Padres organization on September 7.
