= Aaron Bummer =

American baseball player (born 1993)

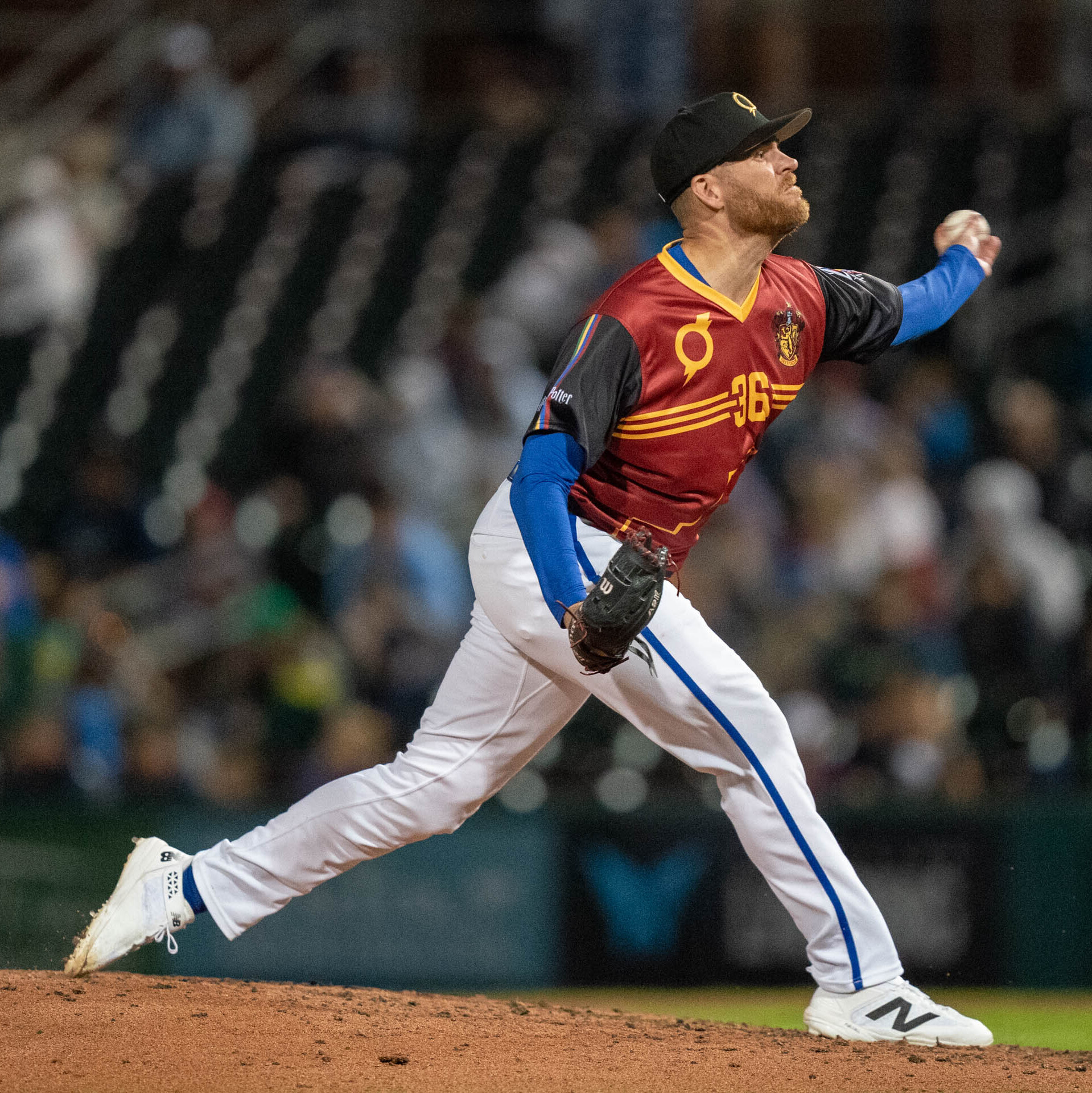
- Bummer with the Omaha Storm Chasers in 2026

Free agent
- Pitcher
- Born: September 21, 1993 (age 32); Valencia, California, U.S.
- Bats: Left Throws: Left

MLB debut
- July 27, 2017, for the Chicago White Sox

MLB statistics (through August 6, 2026)
- Win–loss record: 22–22
- Earned run average: 4.07
- Strikeouts: 442
- Stats at Baseball Reference

Teams
- Chicago White Sox (2017–2023); Atlanta Braves (2024–2026); Kansas City Royals (2026)

Aaron James Bummer (born September 21, 1993) is an American professional baseball pitcher who is a free agent. He has previously played in Major League Baseball (MLB) for the Chicago White Sox, Atlanta Braves, and Kansas City Royals.

== Amateur career ==
Bummer attended Sunrise Mountain High School in Peoria, Arizona, and played for the school's baseball team. He was drafted by the New York Yankees in the 31st round of the 2011 MLB draft. He did not sign with the Yankees and enrolled at the University of Nebraska–Lincoln to play college baseball for the Nebraska Cornhuskers.

In 2013, Bummer played collegiate summer baseball with the Harwich Mariners of the Cape Cod Baseball League, and was named a league all-star. In 2014, as a junior at Nebraska, he had a 7–5 win–loss record with a 3.34 earned run average (ERA) in 15 games started.

== Professional career ==
=== Chicago White Sox ===
The Chicago White Sox selected Bummer in the 19th round, with the 558th overall selection, of the 2014 MLB draft. After signing with the White Sox, Bummer made his professional debut that same year with the Great Falls Voyagers where he compiled a 2.45 ERA in 22 innings pitched. He missed all of 2015 due to injury. In 2016, he pitched for the Arizona League White Sox, Great Falls, and Winston-Salem Dash where he was a combined 1–2 with a 4.86 ERA in 15 relief appearances between the two teams. He began 2017 with Winston-Salem, was promoted to the Birmingham Barons in May, and was promoted to the Charlotte Knights in July.

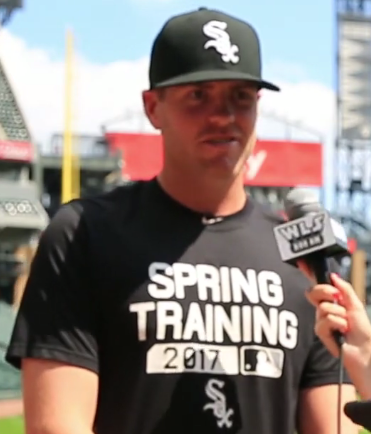
Bummer in 2017

Chicago selected Bummer's contract on July 27, 2017, and he made his Major League debut that same night against the Chicago Cubs, striking out the first batter he faced, Anthony Rizzo. In 49 innings pitched between Winston-Salem, Birmingham and Charlotte prior to his call up, he was 1–5 with a 3.31 ERA. Bummer spent the remainder of 2017 with the White Sox, compiling a 1–3 record and 4.50 ERA in 30 relief appearances. In 2018, Bummer made 37 appearances, collecting an ERA of 4.26 in 31 2/3 innings. The following season, he improved dramatically, making 58 appearances while registering an ERA of 2.13 in 67 1/3 innings and striking out 60. The White Sox signed him a five-year $16 million contract.

In 2020, Bummer only appeared in only nine games due to a left biceps strain that kept him out for a majority of the season. He was able to return for the final week of the season and was added to the White Sox' 2020 postseason roster. He appeared in two games in the 2020 American League Wild Card Series, not allowing a run in 1 1/3 innings combined during Chicago's 2–1 series loss to the Oakland Athletics.

In 2021, Bummer appeared in 62 games with an ERA of 3.51 in 56.1 innings while striking out 75 batters as the White Sox made the postseason. Bummer appeared in three games in the 2021 American League Division Series against the Houston Astros posting a 8.10 ERA in 3 1/3 giving up 5 hits and 3 runs all earned as the White Sox lost in four games. In 2022, Bummer appeared in only 32 games after dealing with a knee injury that kept him out for three months from June to September. He posted an ERA of 2.36 in those 32 games while pitching in 26 2/3 innings and striking out 30 batters.

=== Atlanta Braves ===
On November 16, 2023, the White Sox traded Bummer to the Atlanta Braves in exchange for Michael Soroka, Jared Shuster, Nicky Lopez, Braden Shewmake and Riley Gowens. In November 2024, Bummer and the Braves agreed to a restructured contract, guaranteeing Bummer $3.5 million for the 2025 season and $9.5 million in 2026.

Throughout his entire pro career until 2025, Bummer served as a relief pitcher. On July 5, 2025, after 374 games and 9 seasons as a reliever, he made his first start in a game against the Baltimore Orioles. Bummer set a new personal record by striking out the first five batters he faced, before eventually giving up three earned runs and exiting in the third inning. In 42 appearances (two starts) for Atlanta on the year, he compiled a 3–2 record and 3.81 ERA with 51 strikeouts across 54 1/3 innings pitched. On August 24, Bummer was placed on the injured list due to left shoulder inflammation. He was transferred to the 60-day injured list on September 18, officially ending his season.

On May 19, 2026, after struggling to a 7.63 ERA with 13 strikeouts across 15 1/3 innings pitched, Bummer was released by the Braves.

=== Chicago Cubs ===
On May 27, 2026, Bummer signed a minor league contract with the Chicago Cubs organization. In six appearances split between the rookie-level Arizona Complex League Cubs and Triple-A Iowa Cubs, he accumulated a 1–0 record and 6.00 ERA with six strikeouts over six innings pitched. On July 17, Bummer exercised the opt-out clause in his contract and was released by Chicago.

=== Kansas City Royals ===
On July 21, 2026, Bummer signed a minor league contract with the Kansas City Royals. He made four scoreless appearances for the Triple–A Omaha Storm Chasers, recording seven strikeouts and one save across 4 1/3 innings pitched. On August 2, the Royals selected Bummer's contract, adding him to their active roster. He pitched in two contests for the team, but allowed six runs on six hits with no strikeouts over 1 1/3 innings. On August 7, Kansas City optioned Bummer to Triple–A Omaha, but he rejected the assignment and elected free agency.

== Personal life ==
Bummer earned his bachelor's degree in finance from Nebraska in December 2016. Bummer and his wife, Amber, married in 2018. They had their first child, a daughter, in February 2021.
