= Griffin Jax =

American baseball player (born 1994)

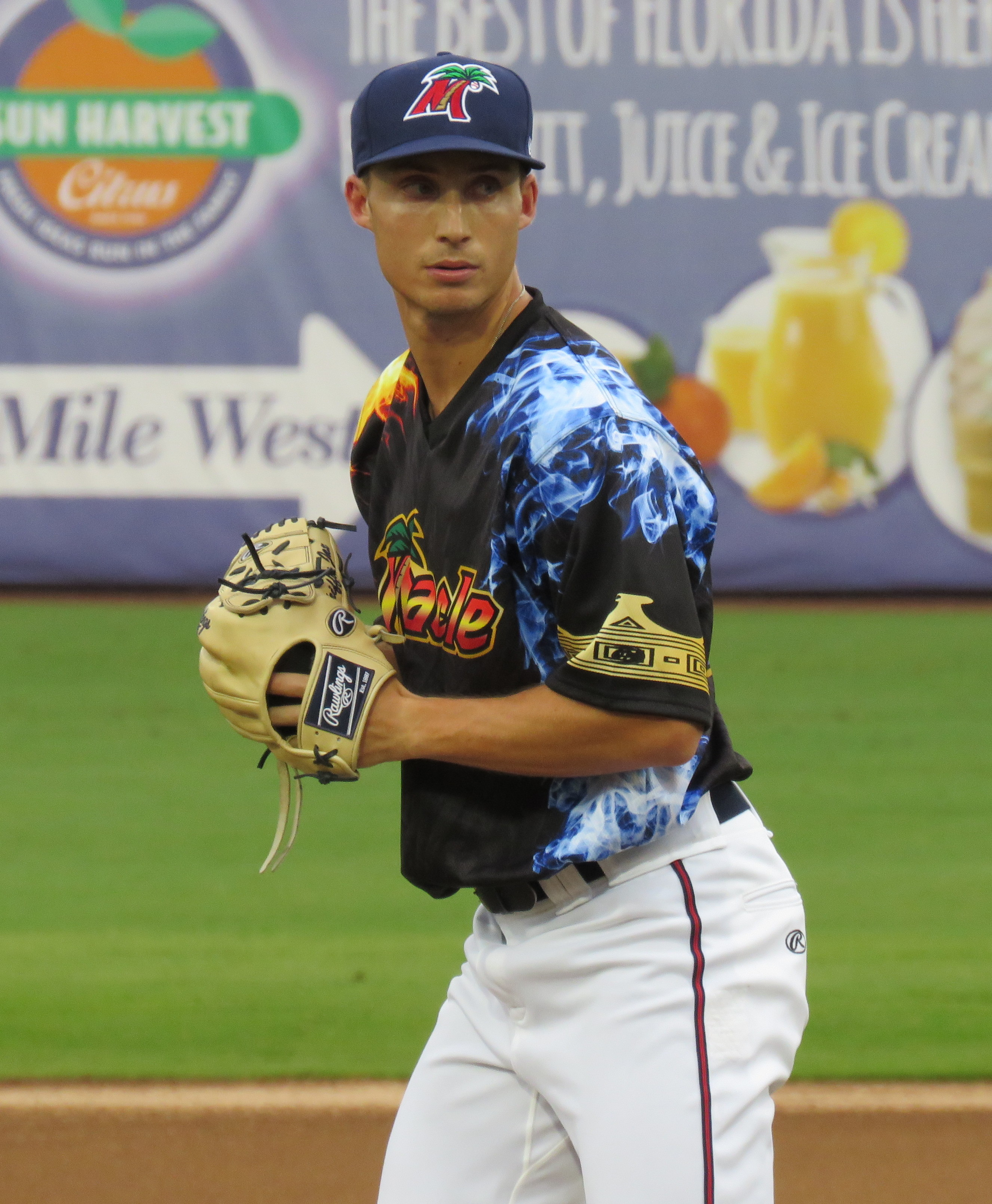
- Jax in 2018 with the Fort Myers Miracle

Tampa Bay Rays – No. 22
- Pitcher
- Born: November 22, 1994 (age 31); Phoenix, Arizona, U.S.
- Bats: Right Throws: Right

MLB debut
- June 8, 2021, for the Minnesota Twins

MLB statistics (through 2026 season)
- Win–loss record: 31–41
- Earned run average: 3.91
- Strikeouts: 521
- Stats at Baseball Reference

Teams
- Minnesota Twins (2021–2025); Tampa Bay Rays (2025–present)
Medals
Men's baseball
Representing United States
World Baseball Classic
Silver medal – second place	2026 Miami	Team

James Griffin Jax (born November 22, 1994) is an American professional baseball pitcher for the Tampa Bay Rays of Major League Baseball (MLB). He has previously played in MLB for the Minnesota Twins. Jax is also an officer in the United States Air Force Reserve.

== Amateur career ==
Jax attended Cherry Creek High School in Greenwood Village, Colorado. In 2013, his senior year, he went 7–1 with a 1.74 ERA and was named Colorado's Gatorade Baseball Player of the Year. He was selected by the Philadelphia Phillies in the 12th round of the 2013 Major League Baseball draft, but did not sign and instead enrolled at the United States Air Force Academy where he played college baseball for the Air Force Falcons.

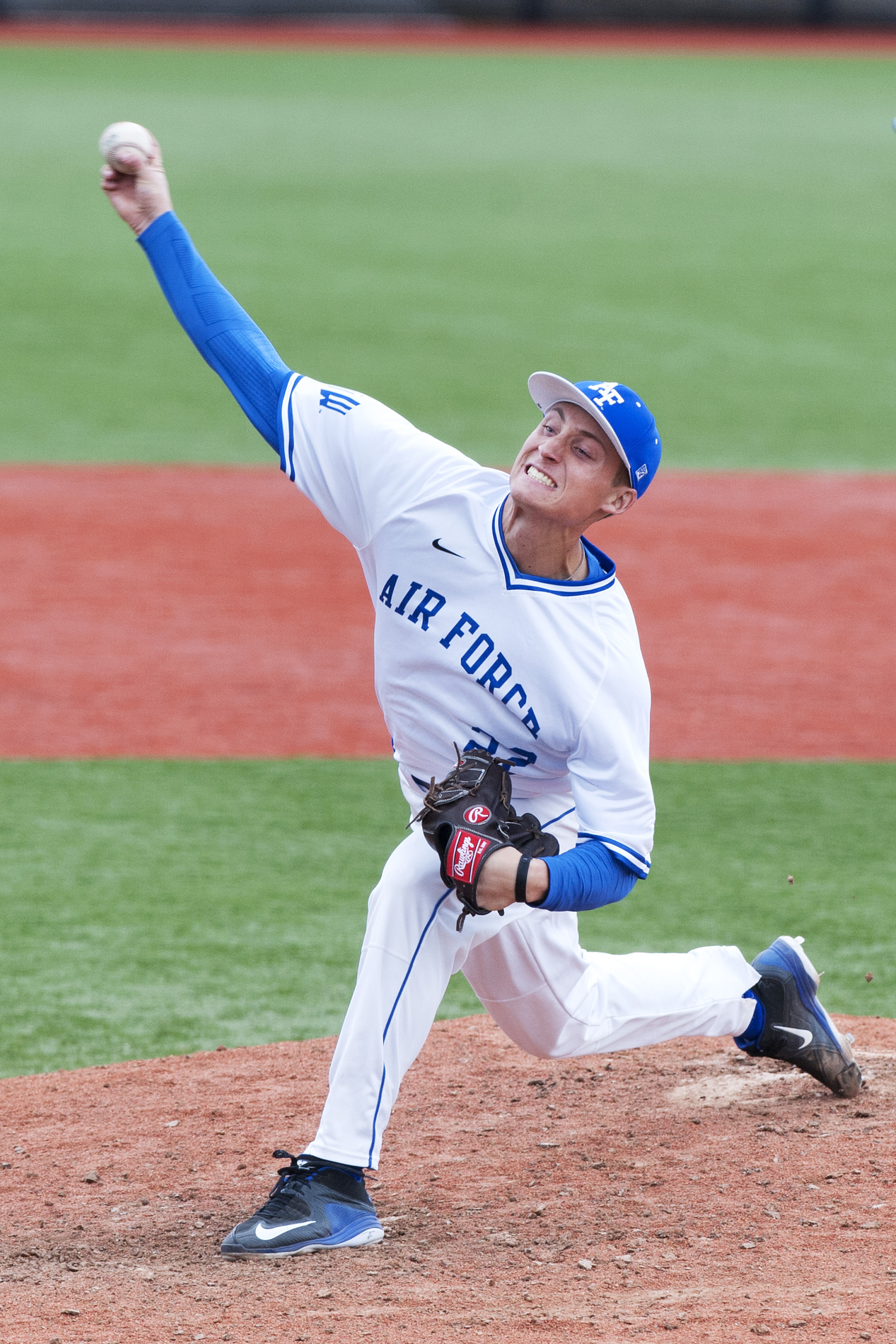
Jax with Air Force in 2016

Jax struggled during his first two years at the Air Force Academy, pitching to a 5.86 ERA as a freshman and a 5.17 ERA as a sophomore. In summer 2015, between his sophomore and junior years, he played summer league baseball for the Eau Claire Express of the Northwoods League. He broke out with the Falcons as a junior in 2016, starting 15 games and going 9–2 with a school-record 2.05 ERA, striking out ninety and walking only ten in 105 1/3 innings. He was named the Mountain West Conference Co-Pitcher of the Year alongside Jimmy Lambert.

== Professional career ==
=== Minnesota Twins ===
After his junior year, Jax was selected by the Minnesota Twins in the third round of the 2016 Major League Baseball draft. He signed for $645,000 and made his professional debut with the Elizabethton Twins of the Rookie-level Appalachian League, pitching 8 2/3 innings. In 2017, he pitched in only five games before he was required to report Cape Canaveral, Florida for active duty. In those five starts, he went 2–2 with a 2.61 ERA between Elizabethton and the Cedar Rapids Kernels of the Single-A Midwest League. In 2018, he was granted membership into the United States military's World Class Athlete Program, allowing him to make Olympic training his full-time responsibility (which counts towards his five years of required active duty) which in turn allowed him to play in the minor leagues full-time. During the season, he pitched for the Fort Myers Miracle of the High-A Florida State League, going 3–4 with a 3.70 ERA in 15 games (14 starts). After the season, he played in the Arizona Fall League.

Jax began 2019 with the Pensacola Blue Wahoos of the Double-A Southern League with whom he was named an All-Star. While with Pensacola, he missed nearly three weeks due to fatigue. In August, Jax was promoted to the Rochester Red Wings of the Triple-A International League, with whom he finished the season. Over 23 starts between the two clubs, Jax pitched to a 5–7 record with a 2.90 ERA, striking out 94 over 127 1/3 innings. Jax did not play a minor league game in 2020 due to the cancellation of the minor league season caused by the COVID-19 pandemic. To begin the 2021 season, he was assigned to the St. Paul Saints of the Triple-A East.

On June 5, 2021, Jax was selected to the 40-man roster and promoted to the major leagues for the first time. Jax made his MLB debut three days later on June 8 in relief at home against the New York Yankees, becoming the first Air Force Academy graduate in MLB history (he is still a captain in the Air Force Reserve). He pitched one inning, giving up three earned runs on two home runs while also registering his first strikeout versus Tyler Wade. Jax finished the 2021 season with a 6.37 ERA over 14 starts and four relief appearances.

Jax became a full-time relief pitcher for the Twins in 2022. In 65 appearances out of the bullpen, he compiled a 7-4 record and 3.36 ERA with 78 strikeouts across 72 1/3 innings pitched. Jax made 71 relief outings for the Twins during the 2023 season, registering a 6–10 record and 3.86 ERA with 68 strikeouts across 65 1/3 innings pitched. He also made his postseason debut in the 2023 American League Wild Card Series and did not give up a run across four appearances in the postseason.

Jax had a career year in 2024, when he set career-highs with 10 saves, 95 strikeouts, a 2.03 ERA, and a 0.87 walks plus hits per inning pitched (WHIP) across 72 appearances. He pitched in 50 games for the Twins in 2025, pitching to a 1–5 record and 4.50 ERA with 72 strikeouts over 46 innings of work.

=== Tampa Bay Rays ===
On July 31, 2025, the Twins traded Jax to the Tampa Bay Rays in exchange for Taj Bradley. Jax pitched in 23 games for the Rays, going 0-2 with a 3.60 ERA and 27 strikeouts across twenty innings.

Jax opened the 2026 season as a member of the Tampa Bay bullpen. In late April, he was moved into the team's starting rotation. On August 9, he was placed on the 15-day injured list with right elbow discomfort. This marked the first time in Jax's MLB career that he was placed on the injured list. On September 2, he was activated and returned to the Rays. Jax made 34 appearances (23 starts) for the Rays and ended the season with an 8–10 record, a 3.53 ERA, and 116 strikeouts over 112 1/3 innings.

== Personal life ==
Jax's father, Garth Jax played for 10 seasons in the NFL for the Dallas Cowboys and the Arizona Cardinals in the mid-1980s to the mid-1990s.

Jax is currently pursuing a graduate degree in business administration from Colorado State University.

Jax and his wife, Savannah, married in January 2021 in Gilbert, Arizona. Savannah holds the rank of captain in the Air Force. In March 2023, the couple had their first child, a daughter.

== See also ==
- List of World Series starting pitchers
