= Jimmy Lambert =

American baseball player (born 1994)

- Pitcher
- Born: November 18, 1994 (age 32); Arcadia, California, U.S.
- Batted: Right Threw: Right

MLB debut
- July 25, 2020, for the Chicago White Sox

Last MLB appearance
- September 3, 2023, for the Chicago White Sox

MLB statistics
- Win–loss record: 4–6
- Earned run average: 4.33
- Strikeouts: 98
- Stats at Baseball Reference

Teams
- Chicago White Sox (2020–2023)

James Michael Lambert (born November 18, 1994) is an American former professional baseball pitcher. He played in Major League Baseball (MLB) for the Chicago White Sox.

== Amateur career ==
Lambert attended San Dimas High School in San Dimas, California. As a senior, he compiled a 13-1 record with a 1.18 ERA, striking out 80 batters in 94 innings. He was not drafted out of high school in the 2013 MLB draft and enrolled at Fresno State University where he played college baseball for the Fresno State Bulldogs. As a sophomore at Fresno State in 2015, he posted a 4-2 record and a 4.66 ERA in 17 games (13 starts). In 2016, as a junior at Fresno State, he was named the Mountain West Conference Co-Pitcher of the Year (alongside Griffin Jax) after compiling an 8-0 record and a 2.65 ERA in ten conference starts. He finished with an overall record of 10-2 with a 3.13 ERA over 15 games as a starter. After his junior year, he was selected by the Chicago White Sox in the fifth round of the 2016 MLB draft and he signed for $325,000.

== Professional career ==
After signing, Lambert made his professional debut with the Arizona League White Sox, and he was promoted to the Kannapolis Intimidators during the season. In 15 games (13 starts) between the two clubs, he was 1–6 with a 5.26 ERA with 43 strikeouts. Lambert began 2017 with Kannapolis, and after going 7–2 with a 2.19 ERA in 12 starts, earning him a South Atlantic League All Star selection, he was promoted to the Winston-Salem Dash in June. He finished the season with Winston-Salem, pitching to a 5–4 record with a 5.45 ERA and 59 strikeouts in 14 starts. In 2018, he began the year with Winston-Salem, and after going 5–7 with a 3.95 ERA and 80 strikeouts in 13 starts, he was promoted to the Birmingham Barons. In five starts for Birmingham, he was 3–1 with a 2.88 ERA and 30 strikeouts. He returned to Birmingham in 2019, going 3–4 with a 4.55 ERA and 70 strikeouts over 11 starts.

On November 20, 2019, the White Sox added Lambert to their 40-man roster to protect him from the Rule 5 draft. Lambert made his MLB debut on July 25, 2020 against the Minnesota Twins at Guaranteed Rate Field. He successfully got 3 outs in the 9th inning and closed out the win for the Sox. Lambert would only appear in one more game after his debut as he missed the rest of the season with a right forearm strain. He made only 4 appearances for the team in 2021, logging a 1–1 record and 6.23 ERA with 10 strikeouts over 13 innings. Lambert made 42 appearances for Chicago in 2022, compiling a 1–2 record and 3.26 ERA with 45 strikeouts across 47 innings pitched.

In 2023, Lambert made 35 appearances for Chicago, registering a 5.26 ERA with 41 strikeouts in 37 2/3 innings of work. On September 13, 2023, it was announced that Lambert would undergo season–ending surgery to remove a bone spur from his right ankle. Lambert was placed on the 60–day injured list with a shoulder injury to begin the 2024 season. On August 24, 2024, it was announced that Lambert had undergone season–ending shoulder surgery. On November 4, he was sent outright to Triple-A. He rejected the assignment and elected free agency.

== Personal life ==
Lambert's brother Peter Lambert, is also a professional baseball player for the Houston Astros.
