= Lane Ramsey =

American baseball player (born 1996)

- Pitcher
- Born: July 16, 1996 (age 30); Oklahoma City, Oklahoma, U.S.
- Batted: Right Threw: Right

MLB debut
- August 6, 2023, for the Chicago White Sox

Last MLB appearance
- September 29, 2023, for the Chicago White Sox

MLB statistics
- Win–loss record: 1–0
- Earned run average: 5.85
- Strikeouts: 18
- Stats at Baseball Reference

Teams
- Chicago White Sox (2023)

Lane Austin Ramsey (born July 16, 1996) is an American former professional baseball pitcher. He played in Major League Baseball (MLB) for the Chicago White Sox during the 2023 season.

== Career ==
=== Chicago White Sox ===
Ramsey graduated from Putnam City North High School in Oklahoma City, Oklahoma, and enrolled at Newman University, where he played college baseball for the Newman Jets. He transferred the University of Oklahoma and played for the Oklahoma Sooners.

The Chicago White Sox selected Ramsey in the 23rd round, with the 678th selection, of the 2018 MLB draft. He made his professional debut with the rookie–level Great Falls Voyagers, logging a 5.77 ERA in 19 contests.

In 2019, Ramsey made 31 relief appearances for the Single–A Kannapolis Intimidators, posting a 4–6 record and 2.75 ERA with 44 strikeouts across 52 1/3 innings pitched. He did not play in a game in 2020 due to the cancellation of the minor league season because of the COVID-19 pandemic.

Ramsey returned to action in 2021 with the High–A Winston-Salem Dash, Double–A Birmingham Barons, and Triple–A Charlotte Knights. In 44 combined appearances between the three affiliates, he pitched to a 4.34 ERA with 56 strikeouts and 7 saves across 47 2/3 innings of work. He split the 2022 season between Charlotte, Kannapolis, and the rookie–level Arizona Complex League White Sox, accumulating a 6.39 ERA with 28 strikeouts and 4 saves in 25 1/3 innings pitched.

In 2023, Ramsey made 32 appearances for Triple–A Charlotte, recording a 4–4 record and 5.50 ERA with 48 strikeouts and 6 saves in 36.0 innings. On August 5, 2023, Ramsey was selected to the 40-man roster and promoted to the major leagues for the first time. He made his major league debut the following day.

Ramsey was designated for assignment by the White Sox on February 3, 2024. He cleared waivers and was sent outright to the Triple–A Charlotte Knights on February 8. He became a free agent after the 2024 season.

=== Miami Marlins ===
On March 5, 2025, Ramsey signed a minor league contract with the Miami Marlins. He made 14 appearances split between the Double-A Pensacola Blue Wahoos and Triple-A Jacksonville Jumbo Shrimp, posting a combined 0-1 record and 3.57 ERA with 24 strikeouts and two saves across 17 2/3 innings pitched. Ramsey elected free agency following the season on November 6.
