= Oscar Colás =

Cuban baseball player (born 1998)

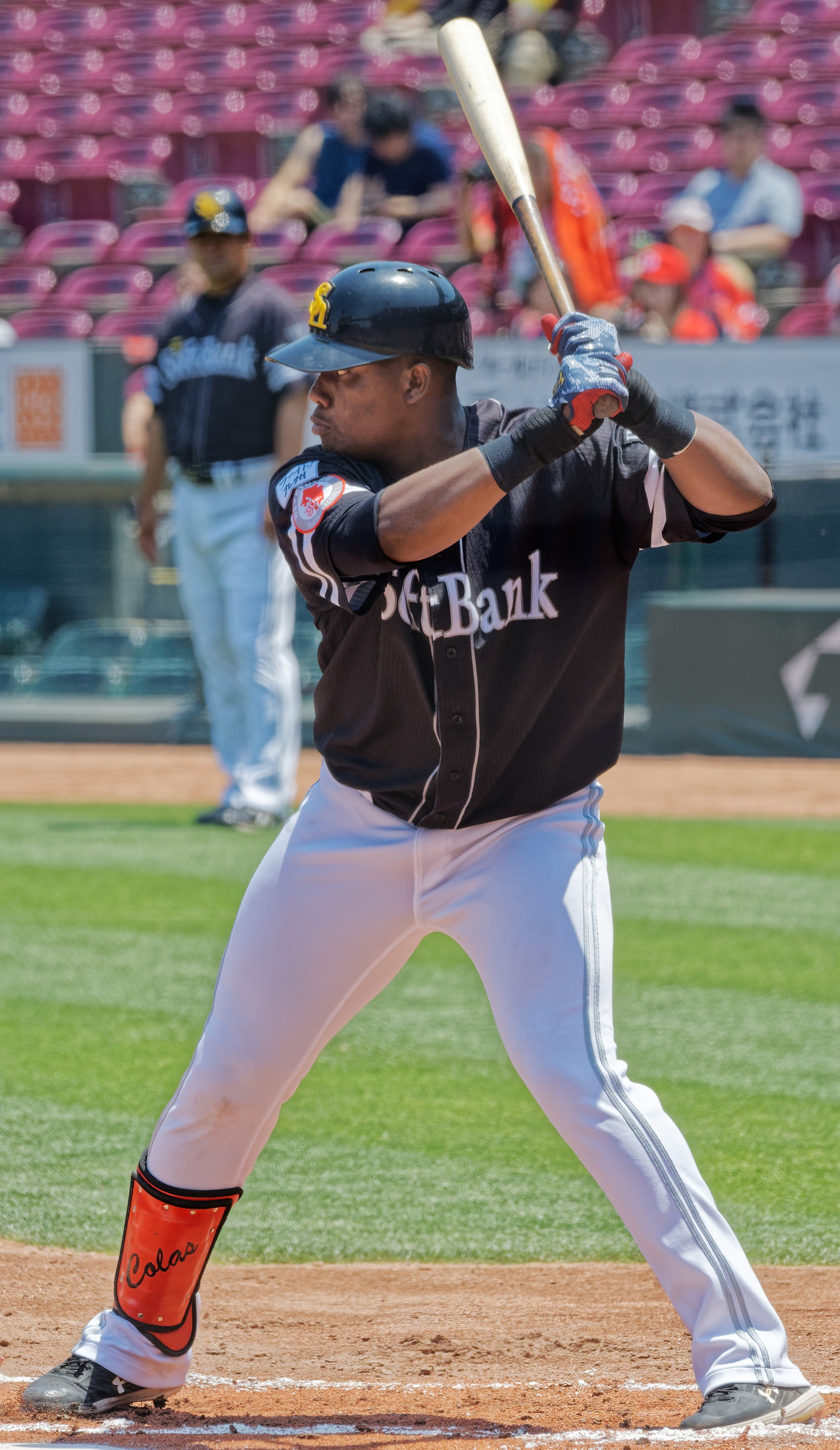
- Colás with the Fukuoka SoftBank Hawks in 2019

Saraperos de Saltillo – No. 24
- Outfielder
- Born: September 17, 1998 (age 27); Havana, Cuba
- Bats: Left Throws: Left

Professional debut
- NPB: August 18, 2019, for the Fukuoka SoftBank Hawks
- MLB: March 30, 2023, for the Chicago White Sox

NPB statistics (through 2019 season)
- Batting average: .278
- Home runs: 1
- Runs batted in: 2

MLB statistics (through 2024 season)
- Batting average: .223
- Home runs: 5
- Runs batted in: 23
- Stats at Baseball Reference

Teams
- Fukuoka SoftBank Hawks (2019); Chicago White Sox (2023–2024)

Career highlights and awards
- Japan Series champion (2019)

Oscar Luis Colás Leon (born September 17, 1998) is a Cuban professional baseball outfielder for the Saraperos de Saltillo of the Mexican League. He has previously played in Nippon Professional Baseball (NPB) for the Fukuoka SoftBank Hawks, and in Major League Baseball (MLB) for the Chicago White Sox.

== Career ==
Colás was born in Cuba. He attended Escuela Número 95 Nguyen in Van Troy, Cuba.

=== Cuban National Series ===
In 2016–2017 season, Colás played in the Santiago de Cuba of the Cuban National Series.

On May 10, 2017, the Government of Cuba signed a contract to dispatch Colás and Liván Moinelo to the Fukuoka SoftBank Hawks as a developmental player. From mid-2017 season to mid-2019 season, he played in informal games against Shikoku Island League Plus's teams and amateur baseball teams, and played in the Western League of NPB's minor leagues.

=== Fukuoka SoftBank Hawks ===
On June 24, 2019, Colás signed a 15 million yen contract (~US$140,000) with the Fukuoka SoftBank Hawks as a registered player under control. On August 18, he debuted against the Saitama Seibu Lions, and recorded a home run at the first Plate appearance in the Pacific League. In the 2019 season, he played 7 games in the Pacific League.

On January 3, 2020, Francys Romero of MLB.com reported that Colás had defected from Cuba and was looking to sign on with a Major League team. On December 23, 2020, Colás was officially granted his release and declared a free agent by Major League Baseball. He was made eligible to sign with a club starting in January 2021.

=== Chicago White Sox ===
On January 25, 2022, Colás signed with the Chicago White Sox. His signing bonus was $2.7 million. Soon after, Colás gave up pitching to focus on outfield work.

Colas spent the 2022 season split between three White Sox affiliates: the High-A Winston-Salem Dash, Double-A Birmingham Barons, and Triple-A Charlotte Knights. In 117 games between the three minor league clubs, Colás slashed .314/.371/.524 while tallying 23 home runs, 79 RBI, and 3 stolen bases while being caught four times.

On March 26, 2023, the White Sox announced that Colás had made the Opening Day roster. He made his MLB debut on March 30, recording a hit as a pinch hitter. Colás batted .211 with one home run and seven RBI in 25 games, before he was optioned to Charlotte. In 48 games for Charlotte, he batted .293 with nine home runs and 29 RBI before he was promoted to the major leagues in July. In 2023 in the major leagues he batted .216/.257/.314 with 5 home runs and 19 RBI in 245 at-bats, as he stole four bases in seven attempts and played primarily right field. Colás was optioned to Triple–A Charlotte to begin the 2024 season. In 13 games for the White Sox, he went 9-for-33 (.273) with four RBI.

Colás was designated for assignment by Chicago on March 26, 2025. He cleared waivers and was sent outright to Triple-A Charlotte on March 28. Colás made 29 appearances split between Charlotte and Birmingham, but posted a .163/.245/.255 batting line with one home run, 12 RBI, and three stolen bases. Colás was released by the White Sox organization on May 24.

=== Los Angeles Angels ===
On May 27, 2025, Colás signed a minor league contract with the Los Angeles Angels. He made 78 appearances for the Double-A Rocket City Trash Pandas, batting .221/.289/.409 with 14 home runs and 46 RBI. Colás elected free agency following the season on November 6.

=== Saraperos de Saltillo ===
On April 24, 2026, Colás signed with the Saraperos de Saltillo of the Mexican League.
