= Jesse Scholtens =

American baseball player (born 1994)

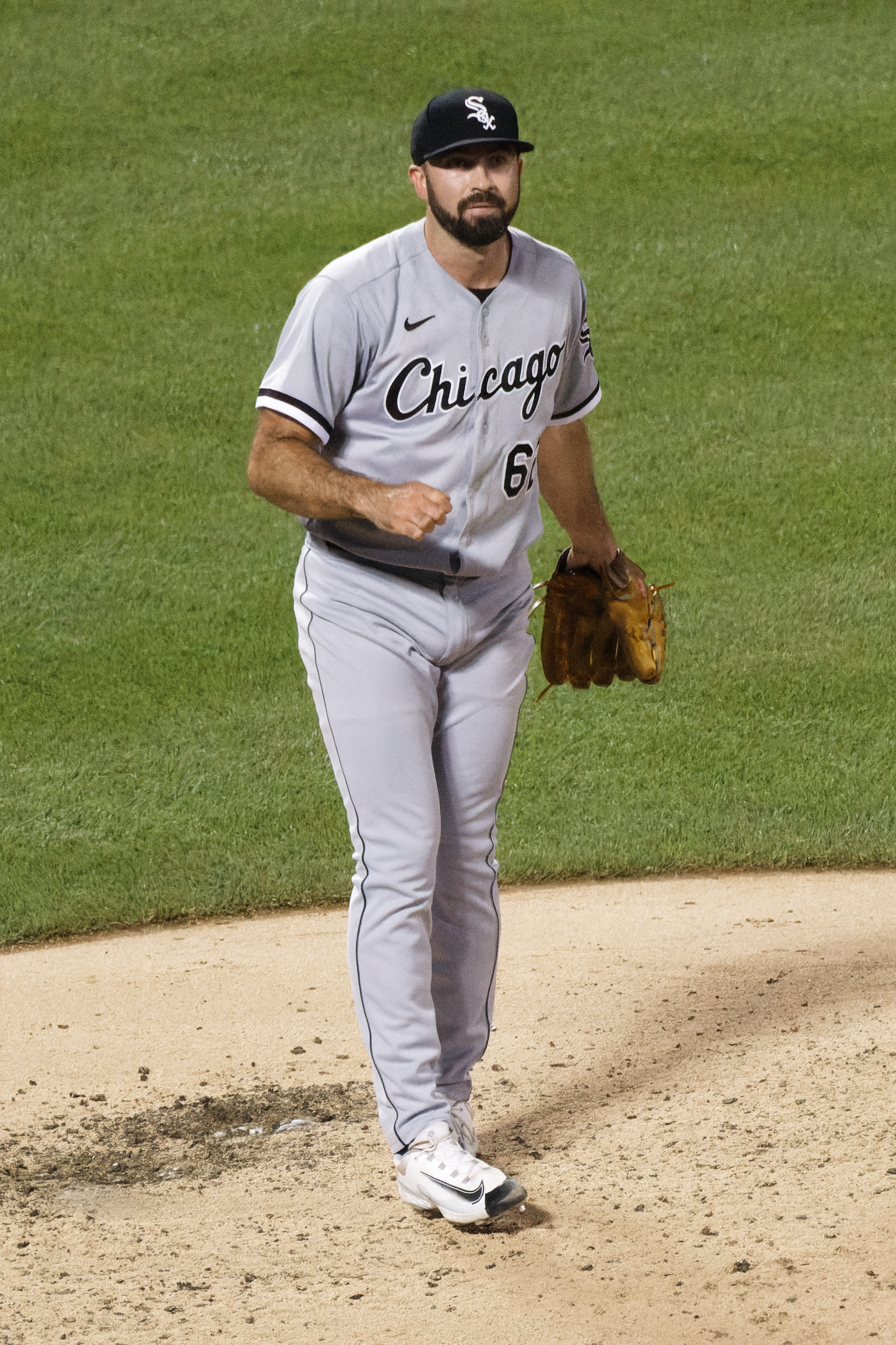
- Scholtens with the White Sox in 2023

Free agent
- Pitcher
- Born: April 6, 1994 (age 32); Fairfield, California, U.S.
- Bats: Right Throws: Right

MLB debut
- April 7, 2023, for the Chicago White Sox

MLB statistics (through 2026 season)
- Win–loss record: 6–13
- Earned run average: 4.98
- Strikeouts: 107
- Stats at Baseball Reference

Teams
- Chicago White Sox (2023); Tampa Bay Rays (2025–2026)

Jesse Scholtens (born April 6, 1994) is an American professional baseball pitcher who is a free agent. He has previously played in Major League Baseball (MLB) for the Chicago White Sox and Tampa Bay Rays.

== Career ==
=== San Diego Padres ===
Scholtens was drafted by the San Diego Padres in the 9th round, 264th overall of the 2016 Major League Baseball draft out of Wright State University. Scholtens split his first professional season between the Low-A Tri-City Dust Devils, Single-A Fort Wayne TinCaps, and High-A Lake Elsinore Storm, recording a cumulative 1.54 ERA in 19 games. He split the following year with Fort Wayne and Lake Elsinore, making a total of 25 appearances (24 starts) and posting a 7–9 record and 3.60 ERA with 123 strikeouts in 147 1/3 innings pitched.

In 2018, Scholtens played for the Triple-A El Paso Chihuahuas and Double-A San Antonio Missions, making 27 appearances (24 starts) and recording a 4.14 ERA and 8–8 record with 119 strikeouts in 137 innings pitched. He spent the 2019 season with the Double-A Amarillo Sod Poodles, pitching to a 5–7 record and 5.40 ERA with 129 strikeouts in 125 innings of work across 24 contests (20 starts). Scholtens did not play in a game in 2020 due to the cancellation of the minor league season because of the COVID-19 pandemic.

Scholtens returned to El Paso in 2021, making 21 appearances (20 starts) for the team and logging a 3–10 record and 5.05 ERA with 103 strikeouts in 101 2/3 innings pitched. He spent the 2022 season with El Paso as well, pitching in 37 games (starting 15) and registering a 4–4 record and 4.10 ERA with 92 strikeouts in 83 1/3 innings of work. He elected minor league free agency following the season on November 10, 2022.

=== Chicago White Sox ===
On December 20, 2022, Scholtens signed a minor league contract with the Chicago White Sox organization. He was assigned to the Triple-A Charlotte Knights to begin the 2023 season. On April 7, 2023, Scholtens was selected the 40-man roster and promoted to the major leagues for the first time. He made 26 appearances (11 starts for the White Sox during his rookie campaign, compiling a 1–9 record and 5.29 ERA with 58 strikeouts across 85 innings pitched.

On February 27, 2024, It was announced that Scholtens would undergo Tommy John surgery and miss the entire 2024 season. On August 2, 2025, Scholtens was activated from the injured list and optioned to Triple-A Charlotte. He was designated for assignment the following day, after the team acquired Bryan Hudson and Elvis Peguero.

=== Tampa Bay Rays ===
On August 4, 2025, Scholtens was claimed off waivers by the Tampa Bay Rays. He made two appearances for Tampa Bay, posting an 0-1 record and 5.40 ERA with 12 strikeouts across 8 1/3 innings pitched.

Scholtens was optioned to the Triple-A Durham Bulls to begin the 2026 season. On November 19, 2026, the Rays released Scholtens.
