= Mike Clevinger =

American baseball player (born 1990)

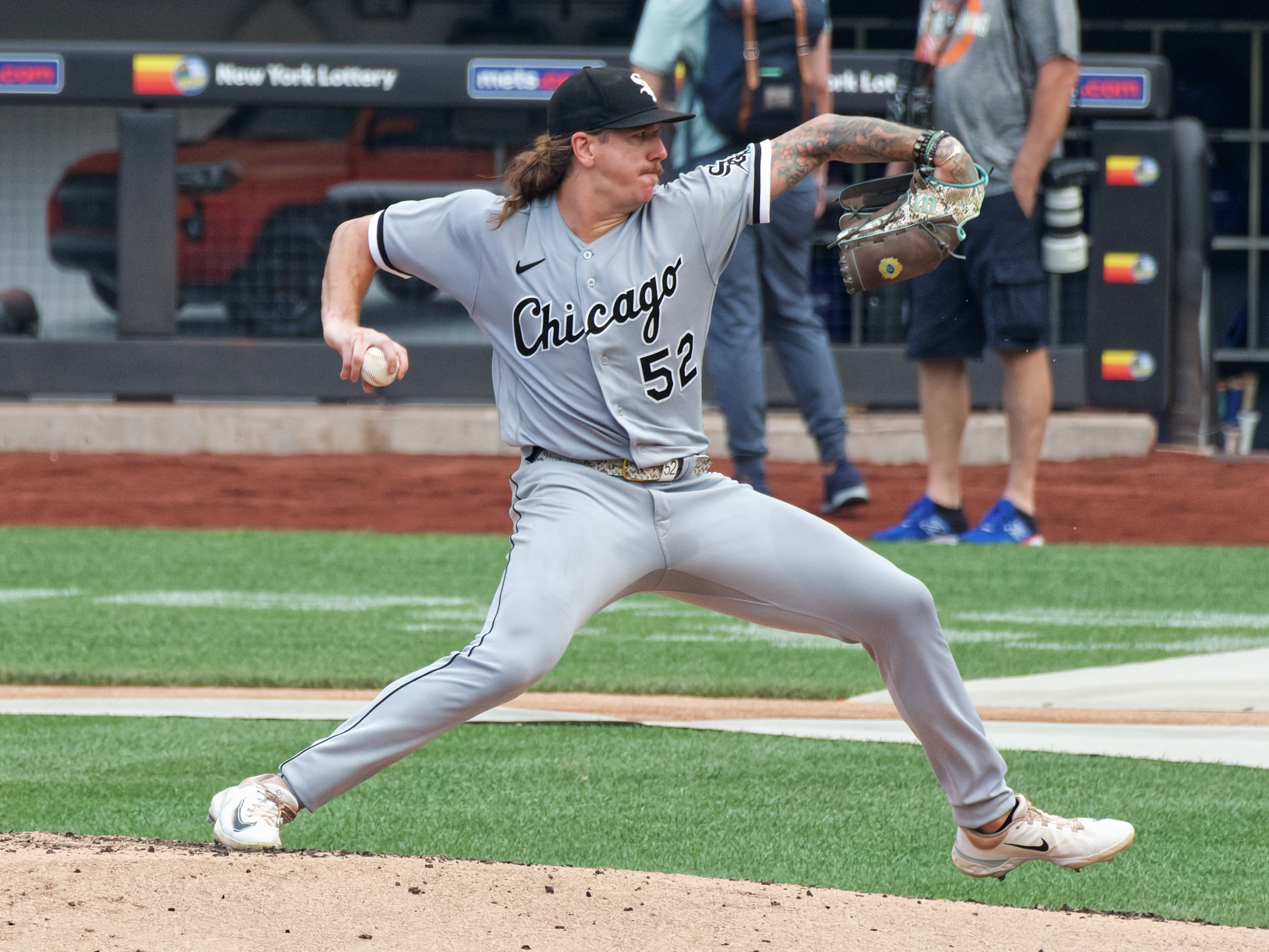
- Clevinger with the White Sox in 2023

NC Dinos – No. 39
- Pitcher
- Born: December 21, 1990 (age 35); Jacksonville, Florida, U.S.
- Bats: Right Throws: Right

Professional debut
- MLB: May 18, 2016, for the Cleveland Indians
- KBO: September 16, 2026, for the NC Dinos

MLB statistics (through 2025 season)
- Win–loss record: 60–44
- Earned run average: 3.55
- Strikeouts: 822

KBO statistics (through 2026 season)
- Win–loss record: 1–0
- Earned run average: 3.74
- Strikeouts: 22
- Stats at Baseball Reference

Teams
- Cleveland Indians (2016–2020); San Diego Padres (2020–2022); Chicago White Sox (2023–2025); NC Dinos (2026–present)

Michael Anthony Clevinger (born December 21, 1990) is an American professional baseball pitcher for the NC Dinos of the KBO League. He has previously played in Major League Baseball (MLB) for the Cleveland Indians, San Diego Padres, and Chicago White Sox. Clevinger made his MLB debut in 2016.

== Early life and amateur career ==
Clevinger was born on December 21, 1990, in Jacksonville, Florida. He graduated from Wolfson High School in Jacksonville, Florida. He played college baseball at The Citadel before transferring to Seminole Community College after his freshman season. After the 2011 season, he played collegiate summer baseball with the Cotuit Kettleers of the Cape Cod Baseball League.

== Professional career ==
=== Los Angeles Angels ===
The Los Angeles Angels of Anaheim selected Clevinger in the fourth round of the 2011 Major League Baseball draft. He spent 2011 with the rookie-level Orem Owlz before being promoted to the Cedar Rapids Kernels the following year, where he pitched in eight games. He had elbow reconstruction surgery, and as a result only pitched in three total games in 2013.

=== Cleveland Indians ===
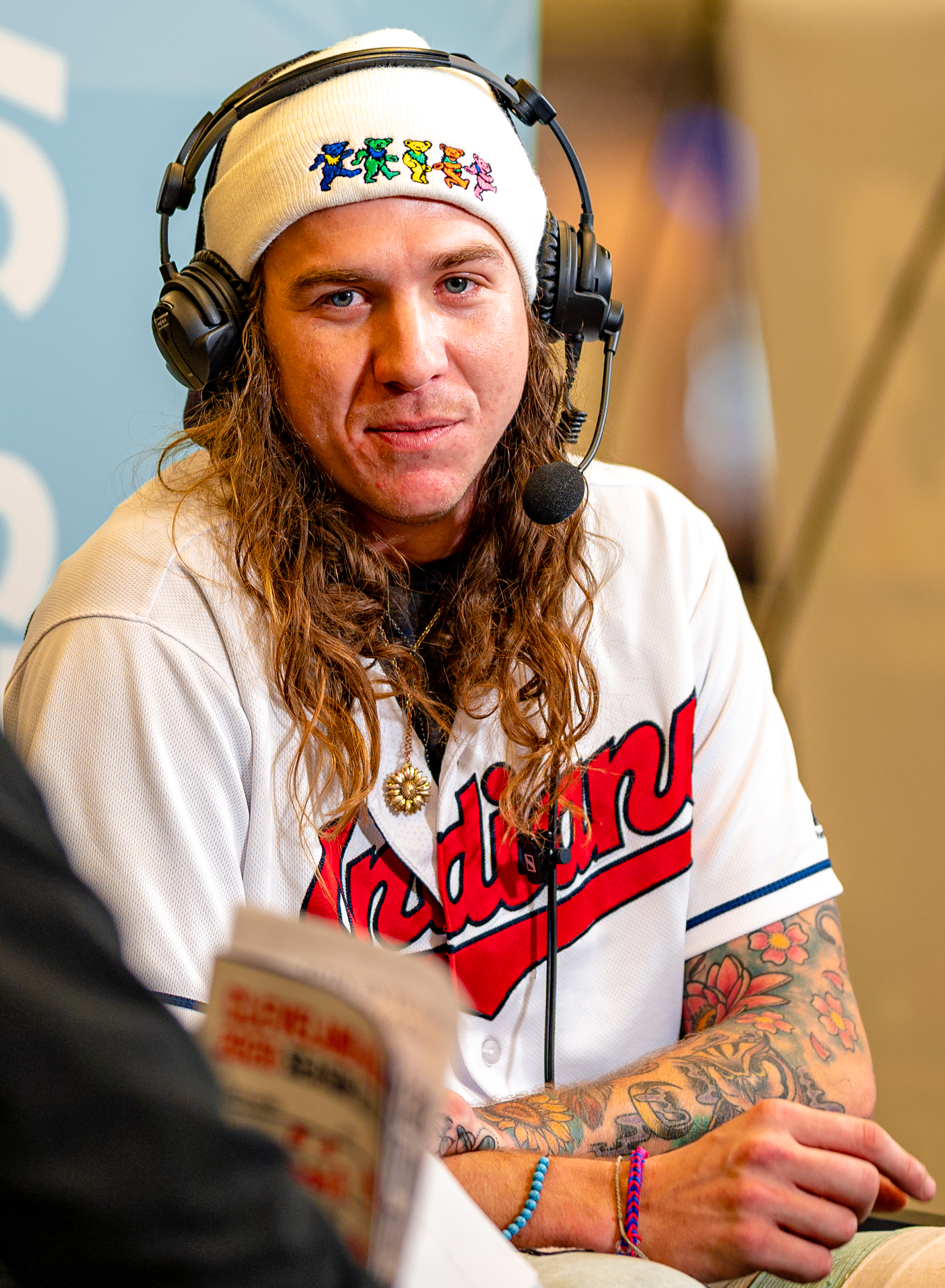
Clevinger with Cleveland in 2020

After pitching for two separate minor league organizations for the Angels in 2014, on August 7 he was traded to the Cleveland Indians for Vinnie Pestano. Clevinger spent 2015 with the Double-A Akron RubberDucks, going 9–8 with a 2.73 earned run average (ERA). The Indians added him to their 40-man roster after the season.

Clevinger was called up by the Indians on May 18, 2016, and made his major league debut that evening. He returned to the minor leagues after three starts, spending the next three months with the Columbus Clippers. Clevinger finished his time with Columbus with 11 wins, a loss, and a 3.00 ERA. He was called back up again on August 4, 2016, to start against the Minnesota Twins. He finished the season appearing in 17 games, 10 of them starts, going 3–3 in 53 innings. After injuries to a few starters in 2017, Clevinger stepped into the rotation and proved to be an asset for the Indians going forward. He finished with a 12–6 record in 27 games, 21 starts. He struck out 137 batters in 121 2/3 innings.

On August 11, 2020, Clevinger and teammate Zach Plesac were placed on the restricted list by the Indians and sent home by the team after violating COVID-19 safety protocols. Clevinger and Plesac faced significant backlash from teammates over their behavior, with Óliver Pérez announcing that he would leave the team if they returned to the roster. Teammates were also frustrated about potentially exposing Carlos Carrasco, who recently had leukemia, to the coronavirus.

=== San Diego Padres ===
On August 31, 2020, the Indians traded Clevinger, along with Greg Allen and Matt Waldron to the San Diego Padres in exchange for Austin Hedges, Josh Naylor, Cal Quantrill, and minor league players Gabriel Arias, Owen Miller, and Joey Cantillo. On November 15, 2020, Clevinger and the Padres agreed to a two-year contract extension, with annual salaries of $2 million in 2021 and $6.5 million in 2022, with a $3 million signing bonus. On the same day, it was announced that Clevinger would need to undergo Tommy John surgery and miss the 2021 season. On February 18, 2021, Clevinger was placed on the 60-day injured list as he continued to recover from Tommy John surgery.

=== Chicago White Sox ===
On December 4, 2022, Clevinger signed a one-year, $8 million contract with the Chicago White Sox with a mutual option of $12 million for the 2024 season or a $4 million buyout. He made his first White Sox start on April 2 against the Houston Astros, where he pitched five innings and allowed three hits, three walks, and recorded eight strikeouts en route to the win. On June 14 against the Los Angeles Dodgers, Clevinger exited the game in the fifth inning; he was placed on the IL two days later with right bicep inflammation. On August 29, he was placed on waivers by the White Sox, but was not claimed and remained with the team. In 24 total starts for Chicago, Clevinger compiled a 9-9 record and 3.77 ERA with 110 strikeouts across 131 1/3 innings pitched.

Clevinger became a free agent following the 2023 season. On April 4, 2024, he re–signed with Chicago on a one-year contract worth $3 million. Clevinger had four starts in 2024 for the White Sox, posting a 6.75 ERA and a record of 0–1 with 15 strikeouts. He was placed on the injured list on May 28 with right elbow inflammation. After further testing, it was revealed Clevinger had a neck injury. The injury required disc replacement surgery, causing him to miss the remainder of the season.

On February 20, 2025, Clevinger re-signed with the White Sox on a minor league contract. On March 27, the White Sox selected Clevinger's contract after he made the team's Opening Day roster. In eight appearances for Chicago, he struggled to an 0–2 record and 7.94 ERA with three strikeouts across 5 2/3 innings pitched. Clevinger was designated for assignment by the White Sox on April 16. He cleared waivers and was sent outright to Triple-A Charlotte Knights on April 18. Clevinger elected free agency on October 3.

=== Pittsburgh Pirates ===
On February 4, 2026, Clevinger signed a minor league contract with the Pittsburgh Pirates. On March 23, he was informed he would not make the major league team after going 1–0 with 15 strikeouts over 14 1/3 innings in spring training; he started two games and relieved in two others. Clevinger went on to make 22 appearances (three starts) split between the rookie–level Florida Complex League Pirates, Single–A Bradenton Marauders, and Triple–A Indianapolis Indians. In those games, he posted a cumulative 2–0 record and 4.15 ERA with 30 strikeouts across 30 1/3 innings pitched. On August 8, Clevinger was released by Pittsburgh after exercising the opt–out clause in his contract.

=== NC Dinos ===
On September 11, 2026, Clevinger signed a six–week, $75,000 contract with the NC Dinos of the KBO League as an injury replacement for Curtis Taylor.

== Pitching style ==
Clevinger's pitching repertoire includes a fastball he can throw as hard as 99 miles per hour, a curveball, a slider, and a changeup.

== Personal life ==
Clevinger has three daughters. The first daughter was born on May 2, 2016. The second daughter was born on March 20, 2017.

Clevinger's nickname is "Sunshine," one he received after teammates likened him to Ronnie "Sunshine" Bass from the film Remember the Titans.

On January 24, 2023, Clevinger was placed under investigation by Major League Baseball for alleged domestic violence and child abuse against his 10-month-old daughter and her mother. On March 5, 2023, MLB announced it had completed its investigation and announced it "will not be imposing discipline on Mr. Clevinger in connection with these allegations".
