= Edgar Navarro (baseball) =

Venezuelan baseball player (born 1998)

Tecolotes de los Dos Laredos
- Pitcher
- Born: February 5, 1998 (age 28); Ciudad Bolivar, Venezuela
- Bats: Right Throws: Right

MLB debut
- July 30, 2023, for the Chicago White Sox

MLB statistics (through 2023 season)
- Win–loss record: 0–0
- Earned run average: 7.27
- Strikeouts: 9
- Stats at Baseball Reference

Teams
- Chicago White Sox (2023)

Edgar Jose de Jesus Navarro (born February 5, 1998) is a Venezuelan professional baseball pitcher for the Tecolotes de los Dos Laredos of the Mexican League. He has previously played in Major League Baseball (MLB) for the Chicago White Sox.

== Career ==
=== Chicago White Sox ===
On March 10, 2018, Navarro signed with the Chicago White Sox as an international free agent. He spent his first two professional seasons with the Dominican Summer League White Sox, combining for a cumulative 6–8 record and 5.30 ERA with 128 strikeouts across 113 2/3 innings pitched. Navarro did not play in a game in 2020 due to the cancellation of the minor league season because of the COVID-19 pandemic.

Navarro returned to action in 2021 with the High–A Winston-Salem Dash. In 35 games out of the bullpen, he struggled immensely to an 8.45 ERA with 37 strikeouts across 43 2/3 innings of work. Navarro split the 2022 season between Winston-Salem, the Double–A Birmingham Barons, and Triple–A Charlotte Knights. In 45 relief appearances, he combined to a 3.64 ERA with 69 strikeouts and 4 saves across 54 1/3 innings pitched.

Navarro was assigned to Double–A Birmingham to begin the 2023 season, and was promoted to Triple–A Charlotte after seven scoreless appearances. On July 29, 2023, Navarro was selected to the 40-man roster and promoted to the major leagues for the first time. In 8 games for Chicago, he posted a 7.27 ERA with 9 strikeouts across 8 2/3 innings of work. Following the season on December 8, Navarro was removed from the 40–man roster and sent outright to Triple–A Charlotte.

On February 20, 2024, it was announced that Navarro would undergo Tommy John surgery and miss the entirety of the season. He elected free agency following the season on November 4.

=== Acereros de Monclova ===
In March 2026, Navarro temporarily joined the Diablos Rojos del México during the 2026 Baseball Champions League Americas. On May 3, 2026, Navarro signed with the Acereros de Monclova of the Mexican League. In 10 relief appearances for Monclova, he posted a 1–0 record with a 5.63 ERA and three strikeouts in two innings of relief.

=== Dorados de Chihuahua ===
On June 5, 2026, Navarro and Geraldi Díaz were traded to the Dorados de Chihuahua of the Mexican League. In 21 games of relief with Chihuahua he threw 21 innings going 0-1 with a 3.86 ERA with 18 strikeouts and 8 saves.

=== Tecolotes de los Dos Laredos ===
On November 10, 2026, Navarro was traded to the Tecolotes de los Dos Laredos in exchange for Tyler Ivey.
