= 2025 Chicago White Sox season =

2025 Chicago White Sox
- League: American League
- Division: Central
- Ballpark: Rate Field
- City: Chicago
- Record: 60–102 (.370)
- Divisional place: 5th
- Owners: Jerry Reinsdorf
- General managers: Chris Getz
- Managers: Will Venable
- Television: Chicago Sports Network
- Radio: ESPN Chicago; Chicago White Sox Radio Network
- Stats: ESPN.com; Baseball Reference

The 2025 Chicago White Sox season was the club's 126th season in Chicago, their 125th in the American League and their 35th at Rate Field. It was their first year under new manager Will Venable. They looked to improve on their dubious 2024 season, in which they set a record for most losses in a single season in the modern era. On August 2, the White Sox beat the Los Angeles Angels 1–0, officially exceeding their win total from 2024. Despite this, the team clinched their third consecutive losing season after a 1–0 loss on August 20 to the Atlanta Braves. The White Sox were eliminated from playoff contention on September 6 after a loss to the Detroit Tigers, who was also the team that handed them their record breaking 121st loss the previous season.

The Chicago White Sox drew an average home attendance of 18,021.

== Offseason ==
=== Manager ===
After starting the 2024 season with a 28–89 record and having recently tied an AL record with a 21-game losing streak, manager Pedro Grifol and parts of his staff were fired by the team on August 8. The White Sox appointed baserunning coach Grady Sizemore as interim manager, under whom the team was slightly better as they went 13–32 to finish the season and won 5 of their final 6 games, despite finishing with an MLB worst 41–121 record that set the league record for losses in a single season. On October 31, 2024, White Sox hired Texas Rangers associate manager Will Venable as their 44th manager. Venable was a former MLB outfielder who played for 9 seasons with the San Diego Padres, Texas Rangers, and Los Angeles Dodgers. Prior to joining the Rangers coaching staff under Bruce Bochy and winning the 2023 World Series, he served as a first and third base coach for the Chicago Cubs from 2018 to 2020 and the bench coach for the Boston Red Sox in 2021 and 2022.

=== Media ===
The 2025 season was the first season where White Sox games were aired on the newly established Chicago Sports Network which directly replaced the team's regional network NBC Sports Chicago effective October 1, 2024.

=== Ballpark ===
The name of the White Sox ballpark was changed to Rate Field on December 17, 2024, having previously been named Guaranteed Rate Field since late 2016. This was done in accordance to the park's title sponsor Rate shortening their name from Guaranteed Rate earlier in 2024.

=== Transactions ===
- November 1, 2024 − the White Sox declined to exercise the 2025 option clause of 3B Yoán Moncada and C Max Stassi, allowing them to become a free agents.
- November 8, 2024 − Justin Dunn was signed to a minor league contract.
- November 12, 2024 − Nicky Lopez and Sammy Peralta elect for free agency.
- November 20, 2024 − the White Sox signed free agent Austin Slater to a 1-year, 1.75 million dollar contract.
- November 22, 2024 − the White Sox declined to tender contracts for Gavin Sheets and Enyel De Los Santos.
- December 1, 2024 − Cal Mitchell was signed to a minor league contract.
- December 7, 2024 − Nick Maton was signed to a minor league contract.
- December 11, 2024 − the White Sox signed free agent Mike Tauchman to a 1-year, 1.95 million dollar contract.
- December 11, 2024 − the White Sox traded Garrett Crochet to the Boston Red Sox for Kyle Teel, Braden Montgomery, Chase Meidroth, and Wikelman Gonzalez
- December 12, 2024 − Dan Altavilla was signed to a minor league contract.
- December 17, 2024 − the White Sox acquired Matt Thaiss from the Chicago Cubs for cash considerations.
- December 18, 2024 − the White Sox signed free agent Bryse Wilson to a 1-year, 1.05 million dollar contract.
- January 1, 2025 − the White Sox acquired Tyler Gilbert from the Philadelphia Phillies for minor leaguer Aaron Combs.
- January 7, 2025 − Bobby Dalbec was signed to a minor league contract.
- January 8, 2025 − the White Sox signed free agent Josh Rojas to a 1-year, 3.5 million dollar contract.
- January 10, 2025 − Omar Narváez was signed to a minor league contract.
- January 14, 2025 − Jonathan Heasley was signed to a minor league contract.
- January 21, 2025 − the White Sox signed free agent Martín Pérez to a 1-year, 5 million dollar contract.
- January 24, 2025 − the White Sox traded Ron Marinaccio to the San Diego Padres for cash considerations.
- January 24, 2025 − James Karinchak was signed to a minor league contract.
- February 3, 2025 − Jacob Amaya was claimed off waivers from the Baltimore Orioles.
- February 7, 2025 − Brandon Eisert was claimed off waivers from the Tampa Bay Rays.
- February 7, 2025 − Brandon Drury and Tristan Gray were signed to minor league contracts.
- February 12, 2025 − the White Sox signed free agent Michael A. Taylor to a 1-year, 1.95 million dollar contract.
- February 15, 2025 − Joey Gallo was signed to a minor league contract.
- February 17, 2025 − Owen White was claimed off waivers from the New York Yankees.
- February 21, 2025 − Mike Clevinger was signed to a minor league contract.
- March 13, 2025 − Travis Jankowski was signed to a minor league contract.
- March 17, 2025 − the White Sox released Joey Gallo.
- March 23, 2025 − Mike Vasil was claimed off waivers from the Tampa Bay Rays.
- March 23, 2025 − Greg Jones was claimed off waivers from the Colorado Rockies.
- March 31, 2025 − the White Sox traded Jake Eder to the Los Angeles Angels for cash considerations.
- April 4, 2025 − Joshua Palacios was signed to a minor league contract.
- April 16, 2025 − Keone Kela was signed to a minor league contract.
- April 26, 2025 − the White Sox acquired Gage Workman from the Chicago Cubs for cash considerations.
- May 10, 2025 − Yoendrys Gómez was claimed off waivers from the Los Angeles Dodgers.
- May 15, 2025 − Vinny Capra was claimed off waivers from the Milwaukee Brewers.
- May 16, 2025 − the White Sox acquired Miguel Castro from the Houston Astros for international pool money.
- May 27, 2025 − the White Sox traded Matt Thaiss to the Tampa Bay Rays for minor league outfielder Dru Baker.
- May 30, 2025 − the White Sox signed free agent Dan Altavilla.
- June 4, 2025 − Ryan Cusick was claimed off waivers from the Detroit Tigers.
- June 8, 2025 − the White Sox signed free agent Tyler Alexander.
- June 13, 2025 − Ryan Noda was claimed off waivers from the Boston Red Sox.
- June 13, 2025 − the White Sox traded Andrew Vaughn to the Milwaukee Brewers for Aaron Civale.
- June 23, 2025 − the White Sox signed free agent Noah Syndergaard to a minor league contract.
- July 7, 2025 − the White Sox signed free agent Kyle Tyler to a minor league contract.
- July 10, 2025 − the Toronto Blue Jays traded Will Robertson to the White Sox for cash considerations.
- July 12, 2025 − the Boston Red Sox traded Blake Sabol to the White Sox for cash considerations.
- July 26, 2025 − the White Sox traded Tristan Gray to the Tampa Bay Rays for cash considerations.
- July 30, 2025 − the White Sox traded Austin Slater to the New York Yankees for Gage Ziehl.
- July 31, 2025 − the White Sox traded Adrian Houser to the Tampa Bay Rays for Curtis Mead, Duncan Davitt and Ben Peoples.
- August 3, 2025 − Elvis Peguero was claimed off waivers from the Milwaukee Brewers.
- August 3, 2025 − Bryan Hudson was claimed off waivers from the Milwaukee Brewers.

== Season standings ==
=== American League Central ===
AL Central
Team	W	L	Pct.	GB	Home	Road
Cleveland Guardians	88	74	.543	—	45‍–‍36	43‍–‍38
Detroit Tigers	87	75	.537	1	46‍–‍35	41‍–‍40
Kansas City Royals	82	80	.506	6	43‍–‍38	39‍–‍42
Minnesota Twins	70	92	.432	18	38‍–‍43	32‍–‍49
Chicago White Sox	60	102	.370	28	33‍–‍48	27‍–‍54

=== American League Wild Card ===
Division leaders
Team	W	L	Pct.
Toronto Blue Jays	94	68	.580
Seattle Mariners	90	72	.556
Cleveland Guardians	88	74	.543

Wild Card teams (Top 3 teams qualify for postseason)
Team	W	L	Pct.	GB
New York Yankees	94	68	.580	+7
Boston Red Sox	89	73	.549	+2
Detroit Tigers	87	75	.537	—
Houston Astros	87	75	.537	—
Kansas City Royals	82	80	.506	5
Texas Rangers	81	81	.500	6
Tampa Bay Rays	77	85	.475	10
Athletics	76	86	.469	11
Baltimore Orioles	75	87	.463	12
Los Angeles Angels	72	90	.444	15
Minnesota Twins	70	92	.432	17
Chicago White Sox	60	102	.370	27

=== Record vs. opponents ===
==== Record vs. American League ====
2025 American League record Source: MLB Standings Grid – 2025
Team	ATH	BAL	BOS	CWS	CLE	DET	HOU	KC	LAA	MIN	NYY	SEA	TB	TEX	TOR	NL
Athletics	—	4–2	3–3	5–1	2–4	4–2	8–5	4–2	4–9	4–3	2–4	6–7	3–3	5–8	2–5	20–28
Baltimore	2–4	—	5–8	6–0	3–4	1–5	3–4	2–4	5–1	0–6	4–9	5–1	7–6	2–4	6–7	24–24
Boston	3–3	8–5	—	4–3	4–2	2–4	4–2	4–2	1–5	3–3	9–4	3–3	10–3	3–4	5–8	26–22
Chicago	1–5	0–6	3–4	—	2–11	5–8	3–3	3–10	3–3	8–5	1–6	1–5	4–2	2–4	3–3	21–27
Cleveland	4–2	4–3	2–4	11–2	—	8–5	4–2	8–5	3–3	9–4	3–3	2–4	5–2	2–4	3–3	20–28
Detroit	2–4	5–1	4–2	8–5	5–8	—	4–2	9–4	5–2	8–5	4–2	2–4	3–3	2–4	3–4	23–25
Houston	5–8	4–3	2–4	3–3	2–4	2–4	—	3–3	8–5	5–1	3-3	5–8	3–4	7–6	4–2	31–17
Kansas City	2–4	4–2	2–4	10–3	5–8	4–9	3–3	—	3–3	7–6	0–6	3–4	3–3	6-1	4–2	26–22
Los Angeles	9–4	1–5	5–1	3–3	3–3	2–5	5–8	3–3	—	2–4	3–4	4–9	3–3	5–8	2–4	22–26
Minnesota	3–4	6–0	3–3	5–8	4–9	5–8	1–5	6–7	4–2	—	2–4	3–4	3–3	3–3	2–4	20–28
New York	4–2	9–4	4–9	6–1	3–3	2–4	3–3	6–0	4–3	4–2	—	5–1	9–4	4–2	5–8	26–22
Seattle	7–6	1–5	3–3	5–1	4–2	4–2	8–5	4–3	9–4	4–3	1–5	—	3–3	10–3	2–4	25–23
Tampa Bay	3–3	6–7	3–10	2–4	2–5	3–3	4–3	3–3	3–3	3–3	4–9	3–3	—	3–3	7–6	28–20
Texas	8–5	4–2	4–3	4–2	4–2	4–2	6–7	1-6	8–5	3–3	2–4	3–10	3–3	—	2–4	25–23
Toronto	5–2	7–6	8–5	3–3	3–3	4–3	2–4	2–4	4–2	4–2	8–5	4–2	6–7	4–2	—	30–18

Updated with the results of all games through September 28, 2025.

==== Record vs. National League ====
2025 American League record vs. National League Source: MLB Standings
Team	AZ	ATL	CHC	CIN	COL	LAD	MIA	MIL	NYM	PHI	PIT	SD	SF	STL	WSH
Athletics	1–2	2–1	0–3	3–0	2–1	1–2	2–1	1–2	1–2	1–2	1–2	1–2	1–5	1–2	2–1
Baltimore	1–2	3–0	1–2	1–2	2–1	2–1	1–2	1–2	2–1	1–2	3–0	3–0	1–2	1–2	1–5
Boston	1–2	3–3	1–2	2–1	3–0	2–1	2–1	0–3	2–1	1–2	1–2	1–2	1–2	3–0	3–0
Chicago	1–2	1–2	1–5	2–1	2–1	0–3	2–1	1–2	1–2	2–1	3–0	1–2	2–1	0–3	2–1
Cleveland	1–2	0–3	0–3	1–5	2–1	1–2	2–1	2–1	3–0	1–2	3–0	0–3	2–1	0–3	2–1
Detroit	3–0	0–3	2–1	1–2	3–0	0–3	1–2	1–2	1–2	1–2	2–4	2–1	3–0	2–1	1–2
Houston	3–0	2–1	2–1	2–1	4–2	3–0	2–1	1–2	2–1	3–0	2–1	2–1	0–3	1–2	2–1
Kansas City	2–1	2–1	2–1	1–2	3–0	1–2	1–2	1–2	1–2	1–2	3–0	1–2	2–1	3–3	2–1
Los Angeles	2–1	2–1	0–3	1–2	1–2	6–0	1–2	0–3	0–3	2–1	1–2	1–2	2–1	2–1	1–2
Minnesota	1–2	0–3	2–1	1–2	1–2	1–2	1–2	2–4	2–1	1–2	2–1	2–1	3–0	0–3	1–2
New York	1–2	2–1	1–2	1–2	2–1	1–2	0–3	3–0	3–3	1–2	2–1	2–1	1–2	3–0	3–0
Seattle	0–3	2–1	2–1	2–1	3–0	0–3	2–1	1–2	1–2	0–3	3–0	5–1	0–3	3–0	1–2
Tampa Bay	2–1	2–1	1–2	0–3	2–1	1–2	3–3	2–1	3–0	0–3	2–1	3–0	2–1	2–1	3–0
Texas	2–4	3–0	1–2	2–1	3–0	1–2	0–3	3–0	2–1	0–3	2–1	1–2	1–2	2–1	2–1
Toronto	2–1	2–1	2–1	2–1	3–0	1–2	2–1	1–2	0–3	2–4	1–2	3–0	3–0	3–0	3–0

Updated with the results of all games through September 28, 2025.

== Game log ==
Legend
	White Sox win
	White Sox loss
	Postponement
	Eliminated from playoff spot
**Bold**	White Sox team member

2025 regular season game log: 60–102 (Home: 33–48; Away: 27–54)
March/April: 7–23 (Home: 4–10; Away: 3–13)

#	Date	Opponent	Time (CT)	Score	Win	Loss	Save	Attendance	Record	Streak
1	March 27	Angels	3:10 pm	8–1	**Burke** (1–0)	Kikuchi (0–1)	—	31,403	1–0	W1
2	March 29	Angels	1:10 pm	0–1	Soriano (1–0)	**Clevinger** (0–1)	Jansen (1)	20,602	1–1	L1
3	March 30	Angels	1:10 pm	2–3	Joyce (1–0)	**Booser** (0–1)	Jansen (2)	19,591	1–2	L2
4	March 31	Twins	1:10 pm	9–0	**Pérez** (1–0)	Paddack (0–1)	—	10,423	2–2	W1
5	April 1	Twins	6:40 pm	3–8	Varland (1–0)	**Murfee** (0–1)	—	12,089	2–3	L1
6	April 2	Twins	1:10 pm	1–6	López (1–1)	**Burke** (1–1)	—	10,193	2–4	L2
7	April 4	@ Tigers	12:10 pm	4–7	Flaherty (1–0)	**Cannon** (0–1)	—	44,735	2–5	L3
8	April 5	@ Tigers	12:10 pm	2–7	Olson (1–1)	**Martin** (0–1)	—	26,098	2–6	L4
9	April 6	@ Tigers	12:40 pm	3–4	Brebbia (1–0)	**Ellard** (0–1)	—	20,981	2–7	L5
10	April 8	@ Guardians	3:10 pm	0–1	Clase (2–0)	**Clevinger** (0–2)	—	33,722	2–8	L6
11	April 9	@ Guardians	5:10 pm	2–3	Sewald (1–1)	**Burke** (1–2)	Clase (1)	12,997	2–9	L7
12	April 10	@ Guardians	12:10 pm	1–6	Williams (1–0)	**Cannon** (0–2)	—	12,663	2–10	L8
13	April 11	Red Sox	6:40 pm	11–1	**Martin** (1–1)	Newcomb (0–2)	—	13,432	3–10	W1
14	April 12	Red Sox	3:10 pm	3–2	**Gilbert** (1–0)	Chapman (2–1)	—	30,423	4–10	W2
15	April 13	Red Sox	1:10 pm	1–3	Crochet (2–1)	**Smith** (0–1)	Chapman (3)	18,840	4–11	L1
16	April 15	Athletics	6:40 pm	3–12	Springs (3–1)	**Burke** (1–3)	Spence (1)	10,673	4–12	L2
17	April 16	Athletics	6:40 pm	1–3	Bido (2–1)	**Gilbert** (1–1)	Miller (5)	10,411	4–13	L3
18	April 17	Athletics	1:10 pm	0–8	Sears (2–2)	**Martin** (1–2)	—	10,560	4–14	L4
19	April 18	@ Red Sox	6:10 pm	3–10	Dobbins (2–0)	**Pérez** (1–1)	—	35,620	4–15	L5
20	April 19	@ Red Sox	3:10 pm	3–4 (10)	Whitlock (1–0)	**Vasil** (0–1)	—	36,559	4–16	L6
21	April 20	@ Red Sox	12:35 pm	8–4	**Eisert** (1–0)	Kelly (1–1)	—	32,632	5–16	W1
22	April 21	@ Red Sox	10:10 am	2–4	Buehler (3–1)	**Cannon** (0–3)	Slaten (3)	34,721	5–17	L1
23	April 22	@ Twins	6:40 pm	2–4	Ober (2–1)	**Martin** (1–3)	Durán (2)	11,828	5–18	L2
24	April 23	@ Twins	6:40 pm	3–6	Topa (1–1)	**Leasure** (0–1)	Coulombe (1)	12,407	5–19	L3
25	April 24	@ Twins	12:10 pm	3–0 (7)	**Smith** (1–1)	Paddack (0–3)	**Eisert** (1)	12,414	6–19	W1
26	April 25	@ Athletics	9:05 pm	5–6	Sterner (1–0)	**Burke** (1–4)	Miller (8)	10,283	6–20	L1
27	April 26	@ Athletics	3:05 pm	10–3	**Cannon** (1–3)	Springs (3–3)	—	8,832	7–20	W1
28	April 27	@ Athletics	3:05 pm	2–3 (10)	Holman (2–0)	**Leasure** (0–2)	—	9,127	7–21	L1
29	April 29	Brewers	6:40 pm	2–7	Peralta (3–2)	**Wilson** (0–1)	—	14,904	7–22	L2
30	April 30	Brewers	6:40 pm	4–6	Koenig (2–0)	**Booser** (0–2)	Megill (3)	10,253	7–23	L3

May: 11–17 (Home: 8–5; Away: 3–12)

#	Date	Opponent	Time (CT)	Score	Win	Loss	Save	Attendance	Record	Streak
31	May 1	Brewers	1:10 pm	8–0	**Burke** (2–4)	Patrick (1–3)	—	11,917	8–23	W1
32	May 2	Astros	6:40 pm	7–3	**Cannon** (2–3)	Valdez (1–4)	—	13,866	9–23	W2
33	May 3	Astros	1:10 pm	3–8	Brown (5–1)	**Ellard** (0–2)	—	20,874	9–24	L1
34	May 4	Astros	1:10 pm	5–4 (7)	**Vasil** (1–1)	Okert (1–1)	—	19,418	10–24	W1
35	May 5	@ Royals	6:40 pm	0–3	Ragans (2–1)	**Smith** (1–2)	Estévez (10)	12,529	10–25	L1
36	May 6	@ Royals	6:40 pm	3–4	Clarke (1–0)	**Booser** (0–3)	—	15,968	10–26	L2
37	May 7	@ Royals	6:40 pm	1–2	Wacha (2–4)	**Cannon** (2–4)	Estévez (11)	12,328	10–27	L3
38	May 8	@ Royals	1:10 pm	0–10	Bubic (4–2)	**Martin** (1–4)	—	25,386	10–28	L4
39	May 9	Marlins	6:40 pm	6–2	**Booser** (1–3)	Meyer (2–4)	—	18,992	11–28	W1
40	May 10	Marlins	6:10 pm	1–3	Faucher (2–1)	**Leasure** (0–3)	Tinoco (3)	24,264	11–29	L1
41	May 11	Marlins	1:10 pm	4–2	**Vasil** (2–1)	Alcántara (2–5)	**Booser** (1)	16,805	12–29	W1
42	May 13	@ Reds	5:40 pm	5–1 (10)	**Wilson** (1–0)	Pagán (0–2)	—	18,997	13-29	W2
43	May 14	@ Reds	6:14 pm	4–2	**Martin** (2–4)	Lodolo (3–4)	**Vasil** (1)	43,585	14–29	W3
44	May 15	@ Reds	11:40 am	5–9	Martinez (2–4)	**Wilson** (0–2)	—	18,513	14–30	L1
45	May 16	@ Cubs	1:20 pm	3–13	Horton (2–0)	**Smith** (1–3)	—	40,171	14–31	L2
46	May 17	@ Cubs	1:20 pm	3–7	Boyd (4–2)	**Burke** (2–5)	—	40,134	14–32	L3
47	May 18	@ Cubs	1:20 pm	2–6	Pomeranz (1–0)	**Cannon** (2–5)	—	40,152	14–33	L4
48	May 19	Mariners	6:40 pm	1–5	Castillo (4–3)	**Martin** (2–5)	Muñoz (14)	10,380	14–34	L5
49	May 20	Mariners	6:40 pm	1–0	**Houser** (1–0)	Lawrence (1–2)	**Leasure** (1)	11,983	15–34	W1
50	May 21	Mariners	1:10 pm	5–6	Legumina (4–1)	**Vasil** (2–2)	Muñoz (16)	10,556	15–35	L1
51	May 23	Rangers	6:40 pm	4–1	**Burke** (3–5)	Mahle (5–2)	**Wilson** (1)	17,885	16–35	W1
52	May 24	Rangers	3:10 pm	10–5	**Vasil** (3–2)	Milner (1–1)	—	19,240	17–35	W2
53	May 25	Rangers	1:10 pm	4–5	Armstrong (2–1)	**Leasure** (0–4)	Garcia (2)	20,908	17–36	L1
54	May 26	@ Mets	3:10 pm	1–2	Díaz (2–0)	**Wilson** (1–1)	—	39,938	17–37	L2
55	May 27	@ Mets	6:10 pm	4–6	Megill (4–4)	**Cannon** (2–6)	Garrett (2)	34,944	17–38	L3
56	May 28	@ Mets	1:10 pm	9–4	**Eisert** (2–0)	Canning (5–2)	—	34,021	18–38	W1
57	May 30	@ Orioles	6:05 pm	1–2	Eflin (4–2)	**Burke** (3–6)	Bautista (9)	22,108	18–39	L1
58	May 31	@ Orioles	3:05 pm	2–4	Kremer (5–5)	**Martin** (2–6)	Bautista (10)	23,470	18–40	L2

June: 10–16 (Home: 7–9; Away: 3–7)

#	Date	Opponent	Time (CT)	Score	Win	Loss	Save	Attendance	Record	Streak
59	June 1	@ Orioles	12:35 pm	2–3	Morton (2–7)	**Houser** (1–1)	Baker (1)	33,037	18–41	L3
60	June 2	Tigers	6:40 pm	1–13	Flaherty (4–6)	**Cannon** (2–7)	—	11,852	18–42	L4
61	June 3	Tigers	6:40 pm	8–1	**Smith** (2–3)	Hurter (2–1)	—	12,308	19–42	W1
62	June 4	Tigers	6:40 pm	4–5	Vest (5–0)	**Eisert** (2–1)	Kahnle (8)	12,381	19–43	L1
63	June 5	Tigers	1:10 pm	3–2 (10)	**Wilson** (2–1)	Brieske (1–3)	—	11,630	20–43	W1
64	June 6	Royals	6:40 pm	7–2	**Leasure** (1–4)	Bowlan (1–1)	—	36,916	21–43	W2
65	June 7	Royals	3:10 pm	4–1	**Houser** (2–1)	Wacha (3–5)	**Altavilla** (1)	19,099	22–43	W3
66	June 8	Royals	1:10 pm	5–7	Lorenzen (4–6)	**Alexander** (3–6)	Estévez (18)	22,137	22–44	L1
67	June 10	@ Astros	7:10 pm	4–2	**Smith** (3–3)	McCullers Jr. (1–2)	**Eisert** (2)	28,950	23–44	W1
68	June 11	@ Astros	7:10 pm	2–10	Gusto (4–3)	**Burke** (3–7)	—	28,519	23–45	L1
69	June 12	@ Astros	7:10 pm	3–4	Valdez (7–4)	**Martin** (2–7)	Hader (18)	28,003	23–46	L2
70	June 13	@ Rangers	7:05 pm	1–3	Webb (4–3)	**Houser** (2–2)	Garcia (5)	31,934	23–47	L3
71	June 14	@ Rangers	3:05 pm	4–5 (11)	Latz (1–0)	**Alexander** (3–7)	—	38,122	23–48	L4
72	June 15	@ Rangers	1:35 pm	1–2	Rocker (2–4)	**Civale** (1–3)	Jackson (9)	38,037	23–49	L5
73	June 17	Cardinals	6:40 pm	2–12	Liberatore (4–6)	**Smith** (3–4)	—	16,974	23–50	L6
―	June 18	Cardinals	6:40 pm	Postponed (rain); Makeup: June 19						
74	June 19 (1)	Cardinals	2:10 pm	4–5	Granillo (1–0)	**Booser** (1–4)	Helsley (14)	see 2nd game	23–51	L7
75	June 19 (2)	Cardinals	4:45 pm	6–8 (10)	Romero (2–3)	**Altavilla** (0–1)	Granillo (1)	20,816	23–52	L8
76	June 20	@ Blue Jays	6:07 pm	7–1	**Alexander** (4–7)	Turnbull (1–1)	—	36,121	24–52	W1
77	June 21	@ Blue Jays	2:07 pm	1–7	Berríos (3–3)	**Civale** (1–4)	—	41,488	24–53	L1
78	June 22	@ Blue Jays	12:37 pm	4–2	**Leasure** (2–4)	Little (3–1)	**Taylor** (1)	38,893	25–53	W1
79	June 23	Diamondbacks	6:40 pm	0–10	Rodríguez (3–4)	**Smith** (3–5)	DeSclafani (1)	12,579	25–54	L1
80	June 24	Diamondbacks	6:40 pm	1–4	Thompson (2–2)	**Vasil** (3–3)	Miller (9)	13,001	25–55	L2
81	June 25	Diamondbacks	1:10 pm	7–3	**Burke** (4–7)	Gallen (5–9)	—	10,217	26–55	W1
82	June 27	Giants	6:40 pm	1–3	Roupp (6–5)	**Alexander** (4–8)	Doval (13)	27,549	26–56	L1
83	June 28	Giants	3:10 pm	1–0	**Houser** (3–2)	Ray (8–3)	**Taylor** (2)	20,090	27–56	W1
84	June 29	Giants	1:10 pm	5–2	**Gilbert** (2–1)	Miller (4–1)	**Vasil** (2)	20,225	28–56	W2

July: 12–13 (Home: 5–8; Away: 7–5)

#	Date	Opponent	Time (CT)	Score	Win	Loss	Save	Attendance	Record	Streak
85	July 1	@ Dodgers	9:10 pm	1–6	Yamamoto (8–6)	**Smith** (3–6)	—	51,368	28–57	L1
86	July 2	@ Dodgers	9:10 pm	4–5	Klein (1–0)	**Taylor** (0–1)	—	53,536	28–58	L2
87	July 3	@ Dodgers	9:10 pm	2–6	May (5–5)	**Civale** (1–5)	—	53,530	28–59	L3
88	July 4	@ Rockies	7:10 pm	3–2	**Houser** (4–2)	Senzatela (3–12)	**Taylor** (3)	48,064	29–59	W1
89	July 5	@ Rockies	8:10 pm	10–3	**Cannon** (3–7)	Márquez (3–10)	—	47,351	30–59	W2
90	July 6	@ Rockies	2:10 pm	4–6	Agnos (1–3)	**Altavilla** (0–2)	Halvorsen (8)	25,662	30–60	L1
91	July 7	Blue Jays	6:40 pm	4–8	Berríos (5–3)	**Burke** (4–8)	—	13,292	30–61	L2
92	July 8	Blue Jays	6:40 pm	1–6 (6)	Bassitt (9–4)	**Civale** (1–6)	—	13,027	30–62	L3
93	July 9	Blue Jays	1:10 pm	2–1	**Houser** (5–2)	Lauer (4–2)	**Leasure** (2)	11,123	31–62	W1
―	July 10	Guardians	6:40 pm	Postponed (rain); Makeup: July 11						
94	July 11 (1)	Guardians	2:10 pm	2–4	Allen (6–7)	**Alexander** (4–9)	Clase (20)	12,869	31–63	L1
95	July 11 (2)	Guardians	7:10 pm	5–4 (11)	**Vasil** (4–3)	Allard (2–1)	—	25,084	32–63	W1
96	July 12	Guardians	3:10 pm	2–6	Bibee (5–9)	**Leasure** (2–5)	—	21,785	32–64	L1
97	July 13	Guardians	1:10 pm	5–6 (10)	Clase (5–2)	**Eisert** (2–2)	—	24,680	32–65	L2
—	July 15	**95th All-Star Game in Cumberland, GA**								
98	July 18	@ Pirates	5:40 pm	10–1	**Cannon** (4–7)	Falter (6–5)	—	28,899	33–65	W1
99	July 19	@ Pirates	5:40 pm	10–4	**Gilbert** (3–1)	Ferguson (2–2)	—	38,041	34–65	W2
100	July 20	@ Pirates	12:35 pm	7–2	**Civale** (2–6)	Heaney (4–9)	—	19,631	35–65	W3
101	July 21	@ Rays	6:35 pm	8–3	**Gilbert** (4–1)	Baz (8–6)	—	10,046	36–65	W4
102	July 22	@ Rays	6:35 pm	3–4	Uceta (7–2)	**Martin** (2–8)	Fairbanks (17)	10,046	36–66	L1
103	July 23	@ Rays	6:35 pm	11–9	**Leasure** (3–5)	Kelly (0–2)	**Altavilla** (2)	10,046	37–66	W1
104	July 25	Cubs	6:40 pm	12–5	**Houser** (6–2)	Imanaga (7–4)	—	38,762	38–66	W2
105	July 26	Cubs	6:10 pm	1–6	Horton (4–3)	**Leasure** (3–6)	—	38,432	38–67	L1
106	July 27	Cubs	1:10 pm	4–5	Brown (5–7)	**Taylor** (0–2)	Palencia (14)	38,036	38–68	L2
107	July 28	Phillies	6:40 pm	6–2	**Martin** (3–8)	Sánchez (9–3)	—	15,106	39–68	W1
108	July 29	Phillies	6:40 pm	3–6	Luzardo (9–5)	**Cannon** (4–8)	—	20,730	39–69	L1
109	July 30	Phillies	1:10 pm	9–3	**Vasil** (5–3)	Lazar (1–1)	—	12,718	40–69	W1

August: 9–19 (Home: 6–10; Away: 3–9)

#	Date	Opponent	Time (CT)	Score	Win	Loss	Save	Attendance	Record	Streak
110	August 1	@ Angels	8:38 pm	6–3	**Leasure** (4–6)	Anderson (2–7)	**Wilson** (2)	29,937	41–69	W2
111	August 2	@ Angels	9:07 pm	1–0	**Civale** (3–6)	Hendricks (6–8)	**Leasure** (3)	39,161	42–69	W3
112	August 3	@ Angels	3:07 pm	5–8	Jansen (4–2)	**Alexander** (4–10)	—	30,963	42–70	L1
113	August 5	@ Mariners	8:40 pm	3–8	Woo (9–6)	**Martin** (3–9)	—	30,686	42–71	L2
114	August 6	@ Mariners	8:40 pm	6–8	Kirby (7–5)	**Cannon** (4–9)	Muñoz (26)	32,756	42–72	L3
115	August 7	@ Mariners	3:10 pm	3–4 (11)	Kowar (2–0)	**Eisert** (2–3)	—	37,930	42–73	L4
116	August 8	Guardians	6:40 pm	5–9	Bibee (8–9)	**Civale** (3–7)	—	21,007	42–74	L5
117	August 9	Guardians	6:10 pm	1–3	Cantillo (3–2)	**Burke** (4–9)	Smith (5)	17,893	42–75	L6
118	August 10	Guardians	1:10 pm	6–4	**Martin** (4–9)	Cecconi (5–5)	**Taylor** (4)	19,750	43–75	W1
119	August 11	Tigers	6:40 pm	1–2	Finnegan (2–4)	**Eisert** (2–4)	Vest (17)	16,054	43–76	L1
120	August 12	Tigers	6:40 pm	9–6	**Gómez** (2–1)	Flaherty (6–12)	**Leasure** (4)	19,494	44–76	W1
121	August 13	Tigers	1:10 pm	0–1	Melton (3–1)	**Pérez** (1–2)	Vest (18)	13,647	44–77	L1
122	August 15	@ Royals	7:10 pm	1–3	Cameron (7–5)	**Civale** (3–8)	Estévez (31)	20,829	44–78	L2
123	August 16	@ Royals	6:10 pm	2–6	Lynch IV (5–2)	**Burke** (4–10)	—	28,355	44–79	L3
124	August 17	@ Royals	1:10 pm	2–6	Erceg (5–3)	**Taylor** (0–3)	—	15,144	44–80	L4
125	August 18	@ Braves	6:15 pm	13–9	**Gómez** (3–1)	Strider (5–11)	—	27,868	45–80	W1
126	August 19	@ Braves	6:15 pm	10–11	Lee (2–3)	**Alexander** (4–11)	Iglesias (20)	29,134	45–81	L1
127	August 20	@ Braves	6:15 pm	0–1	Waldrep (4–0)	**Pérez** (1–3)	Iglesias (21)	30,054	45–82	L2
128	August 22	Twins	6:40 pm	7–9	Funderburk (3–1)	**Eisert** (2–5)	Topa (3)	22,372	45–83	L3
129	August 23	Twins	6:10 pm	7–3	**Martin** (5–9)	Abel (2–3)	—	16,998	46–83	W1
130	August 24	Twins	1:10 pm	8–0	**Eisert** (3–5)	Bradley (6–7)	—	18,723	47–83	W2
131	August 25	Royals	6:40 pm	7–0	**Smith** (4–7)	Cameron (7–6)	—	10,444	48–83	W3
132	August 26	Royals	6:40 pm	4–5	Long (2–3)	**Taylor** (0–4)	Estévez (35)	10,907	48–84	L1
133	August 27	Royals	6:40 pm	1–12	Bergert (2–1)	**Civale** (3–9)	—	10,598	48–85	L2
134	August 28	Yankees	6:40 pm	4–10	Warren (8–6)	**Alexander** (4–12)	—	18,187	48–86	L3
135	August 29	Yankees	6:40 pm	2–10	Rodón (15–7)	**Gómez** (3–2)	—	28,069	48–87	L4
136	August 30	Yankees	6:10 pm	3–5 (11)	Bednar (5–5)	**Alexander** (4–13)	Doval (16)	26,624	48–88	L5
137	August 31	Yankees	1:10 pm	3–2	**Booser** (2–4)	Hill (4–4)	**Vasil** (3)	27,810	49–88	W1

September: 11–14 (Home: 3–6; Away: 8–8)

#	Date	Opponent	Time (CT)	Score	Win	Loss	Save	Attendance	Record	Streak
138	September 1	@ Twins	1:10 pm	6–5	**Alexander** (5–13)	Topa (1–4)	**Leasure** (5)	15,892	50–88	W2
139	September 2	@ Twins	6:40 pm	12–3	**Martin** (6–9)	Hatch (2–1)	—	11,721	51–88	W3
140	September 3	@ Twins	6:40 pm	4–3	**Taylor** (1–4)	Topa (1–5)	**Leasure** (6)	11,904	52–88	W4
141	September 4	@ Twins	6:40 pm	11–8	**González** (1–0)	Adams (1–3)	—	13,188	53–88	W5
142	September 5	@ Tigers	5:40 pm	7–5	**Smith** (5–7)	Horn (0–1)	**Leasure** (7)	35,216	54–88	W6
143	September 6	@ Tigers	5:10 pm	0–6	Skubal (13–4)	**Pérez** (1–4)	—	32,115	54–89	L1
144	September 7	@ Tigers	12:40 pm	6–4	**Taylor** (2–4)	Kahnle (1–4)	**Vasil** (4)	29,292	55–89	W1
145	September 9	Rays	6:40 pm	4–5	Kelly (2–3)	**Alexander** (5–14)	Fairbanks (25)	12,487	55–90	L1
146	September 10	Rays	6:40 pm	6–5	**Leasure** (5–6)	Montgomery (1–3)	**Gilbert** (1)	12,099	56–90	W1
147	September 11	Rays	1:10 pm	5–1	**Smith** (6–7)	Seymour (3–2)	—	11,850	57–90	W2
148	September 12	@ Guardians	6:10 pm	0–4	Bibee (10–10)	**Pérez** (1–5)	—	21,779	57–91	L1
149	September 13	@ Guardians	5:10 pm	1–3	Messick (3–0)	**Martin** (6–10)	Smith (14)	28,643	57–92	L2
150	September 14	@ Guardians	12:40 pm	2–3	Festa (5–3)	**Eisert** (3–6)	Smith (15)	22,320	57–93	L3
151	September 15	Orioles	6:40 pm	1–4	Bradish (1–1)	**Wilson** (2–2)	Enns (2)	11,020	57–94	L4
152	September 16	Orioles	6:40 pm	7–8	Kremer (10–10)	**Smith** (6–8)	Akin (6)	12,428	57–95	L5
153	September 17	Orioles	1:10 pm	1–3	Wells (2–0)	**Pérez** (1–6)	Akin (7)	10,919	57–96	L6
154	September 19	Padres	6:40 pm	4–3	**Martin** (7–10)	Cease (8–12)	**Taylor** (5)	30,505	58–96	W1
155	September 20	Padres	6:10 pm	3–7	Morejón (13–5)	**Gómez** (3–3)	—	27,345	58–97	L1
156	September 21	Padres	1:10 pm	2–3	King (5–3)	**Burke** (4–11)	Suárez (40)	24,205	58–98	L2
157	September 23	@ Yankees	6:05 pm	2–3	Weaver (4–4)	**Eisert** (3–7)	—	38,318	58–99	L3
158	September 24	@ Yankees	6:05 pm	1–8	Fried (19–5)	**Cannon** (4–10)	—	37,751	58–100	L4
159	September 25	@ Yankees	6:05 pm	3–5	Rodón (18–9)	**Gilbert** (4–2)	Bednar (26)	38,545	58–101	L5
160	September 26	@ Nationals	5:45 pm	10–9	**Ellard** (1–2)	Ferrer (4–4)	**Taylor** (6)	33,938	59–101	W1
161	September 27	@ Nationals	3:05 pm	5–6	Fernández (1–0)	**Eisert** (3–8)	Ferrer (11)	24,360	59–102	L1
162	September 28	@ Nationals	2:05 pm	8–0	**Smith** (7–8)	Lord (5–10)	—	22,473	60–102	W1

== Roster ==
2025 Chicago White Sox
Roster
Pitchers: 70 Tyler Alexander; 58 Dan Altavilla; 71 Cam Booser; 59 Sean Burke; 48 Jonathan Cannon; 60 Miguel Castro; 43 Aaron Civale; 52 Mike Clevinger; 53 Brandon Eisert; 55 Fraser Ellard; 68 Caleb Freeman; 40 Tyler Gilbert; 94 Yoendrys Gómez; 66 Wikelman González; 57 Adrian Houser; 60 Bryan Hudson; 49 Jordan Leasure; 65 Davis Martin; 63 Penn Murfee; 60 Jake Palisch; 47 Elvis Peguero; 54 Martín Pérez; 51 Jared Shuster; 64 Shane Smith; 31 Grant Taylor; 61 Mike Vasil; 67 Owen White; 46 Bryse Wilson; 36 Steven Wilson	Catchers: 26 Korey Lee; 22 Omar Narváez; 7 Edgar Quero; 8 Kyle Teel; 29 Matt Thaiss; Infielders: 0,8 Jacob Amaya; 41 Vinny Capra; 31 Bobby Dalbec; 30 Tim Elko; 0 Nick Maton; 29 Curtis Mead; 10 Chase Meidroth; 12 Colson Montgomery; 29 Ryan Noda; 44 Bryan Ramos; 5 Josh Rojas; 50 Lenyn Sosa; 20 Miguel Vargas; 25 Andrew Vaughn; 41 Gage Workman	Outfielders: 27 Brooks Baldwin; 23 Andrew Benintendi; 5 Dominic Fletcher; 47 Derek Hill; 31 Travis Jankowski; 30 Greg Jones; 32 Corey Julks; 47 Joshua Palacios; 88 Luis Robert; 37 Will Robertson; 15 Austin Slater; 18 Mike Tauchman; 21 Michael A. Taylor	Manager: 1 Will Venable; Coaches: 38 Jason Bourgeois (first base/outfield); 39 Drew Butera (catching); 98 Miguel González (bullpen catcher); 17 Justin Jirschele (third base/infield); 34 Ethan Katz (pitching); 77 Joel McKeithan (assistant hitting); 28 Walker McKinven (bench); 96 Luis Sierra (bullpen catcher); 24 Grady Sizemore (offensive coordinator); 99 Marcus Thames (hitting); 53 Matt Wise (bullpen)

== Statistics ==
=== Batting ===
(through 2025 season)
Statistics in bold are team leader.
Note: G = Games played; AB = At bats; R = Runs; H = Hits; 2B = Doubles; 3B = Triples; HR = Home runs; RBI = Runs batted in; SB = Stolen bases; BB = Walks; K = Strikeouts; Avg. = Batting average; OBP = On Base Percentage; SLG = Slugging Percentage; TB = Total Bases

Player	G	AB	R	H	2B	3B	HR	RBI	SB	BB	K	AVG	OBP	SLG	TB
Tyler Alexander	1	1	0	0	0	0	0	0	0	0	0	.000	.000	.000	0
Jacob Amaya	36	66	7	7	1	0	0	0	0	3	16	.106	.139	.121	8
Brooks Baldwin	103	300	32	72	15	1	11	38	5	21	86	.240	.290	.407	122
Andrew Benintendi	116	420	57	101	16	**2**	20	63	1	40	82	.240	.307	.431	181
Vinny Capra	23	42	4	8	2	0	0	2	1	1	10	.190	.205	.238	10
Bobby Dalbec	7	18	2	4	1	0	0	1	0	3	6	.222	.333	.278	5
Tim Elko	23	67	6	9	1	0	4	8	1	5	30	.134	.194	.328	22
Dominic Fletcher	12	32	5	7	5	0	1	2	1	2	2	.219	.265	.469	15
Derek Hill	4	7	0	2	0	0	0	1	0	0	2	.286	.375	.286	2
Travis Jankowski	7	14	1	3	0	0	0	0	0	1	3	.214	.267	.214	3
Greg Jones	3	2	0	0	0	0	0	0	1	0	2	.000	.000	.000	0
Corey Julks	6	12	2	3	2	0	0	1	0	0	3	.250	.231	.417	5
Korey Lee	25	35	10	9	3	0	1	3	0	4	7	.257	.333	.429	15
Nick Maton	25	54	5	9	2	0	2	4	0	9	19	.167	.286	.315	17
Curtis Mead	41	125	12	30	8	0	0	11	1	3	30	.240	.280	.304	38
Chase Meidroth	122	450	54	114	15	0	5	23	14	45	72	.253	**.329**	.320	144
Colson Montgomery	71	255	43	61	9	1	21	55	0	25	83	.239	.311	.529	135
Omar Narváez	4	7	1	2	0	0	0	3	0	2	1	.286	.400	.286	2
Ryan Noda	16	34	3	3	0	0	1	1	0	10	19	.088	.295	.176	6
Joshua Palacios	51	128	11	26	4	0	3	9	0	12	36	.203	.292	.305	39
Edgar Quero	111	365	31	98	17	0	5	36	0	32	71	.268	.333	.356	130
Bryan Ramos	4	12	1	2	2	0	0	2	0	0	4	.167	.167	.333	4
Luis Robert Jr.	110	382	52	85	12	0	14	53	**33**	40	112	.223	.297	.364	139
Will Robertson	24	60	2	8	1	0	0	8	0	1	20	.133	.159	.150	9
Josh Rojas	69	189	14	34	9	0	2	11	4	19	48	.180	.252	.259	49
Austin Slater	51	123	20	29	6	1	5	11	1	11	35	.236	.299	.423	52
Lenyn Sosa	**140**	**518**	57	**137**	20	1	**22**	**75**	2	18	**127**	**.264**	.293	**.434**	**225**
Mike Tauchman	93	335	44	88	17	1	9	40	0	45	86	.263	.356	.400	134
Michael A. Taylor	134	295	33	59	20	1	9	35	8	23	110	.200	.259	.366	108
Kyle Teel	78	253	38	69	11	0	8	35	3	37	77	.273	.375	.411	104
Matt Thaiss	35	85	11	18	4	0	1	8	1	23	21	.212	.382	.294	25
Miguel Vargas	138	504	**80**	118	**32**	**2**	16	60	6	**56**	100	.234	.316	.401	202
Andrew Vaughn	48	185	9	35	8	0	5	19	0	7	43	.189	.218	.314	58
Gage Workman	3	2	0	0	0	0	0	0	0	0	1	.000	.000	.000	0
**TEAM TOTALS**	162	5377	647	1250	243	10	165	626	85	498	1364	.232	.302	.373	2008

=== Pitching ===
(through 2025 season)
Statistics in bold are team leader.
Note: W = Wins; L = Losses; ERA = Earned run average; WHIP = Walks plus hits per inning pitched; G = Games pitched; GS = Games started; SV = Saves; IP = Innings pitched; H = Hits allowed; R = Runs allowed; ER = Earned runs allowed; BB = Walks allowed; K = Strikeouts

Player	W	L	ERA	WHIP	G	GS	SV	IP	H	R	ER	BB	K
Tyler Alexander	2	9	4.26	1.35	31	1	0	61.1	65	31	29	18	52
Dan Altavilla	0	1	2.48	1.17	28	0	2	29.0	19	9	8	15	21
Jacob Amaya	0	0	0.00	0.00	1	0	0	1.0	0	0	0	0	0
Cam Booser	2	4	5.52	1.52	39	0	1	31.0	28	22	19	19	35
Sean Burke	4	**11**	4.29	1.45	28	22	0	134.1	132	**76**	64	**63**	133
Jonathan Cannon	4	10	5.82	1.50	22	17	0	103.2	116	69	**67**	38	86
Vinny Capra	0	0	6.00	1.67	3	0	0	3.0	5	4	2	0	1
Miguel Castro	0	0	7.50	1.67	6	0	0	6.0	5	5	5	5	4
Aaron Civale	2	7	5.37	1.37	13	13	0	67.0	66	44	40	26	55
Mike Clevinger	0	2	7.94	2.29	8	0	0	5.2	5	5	5	8	3
Brandon Eisert	3	8	4.39	1.44	**72**	3	2	69.2	75	36	34	25	74
Fraser Ellard	1	2	4.24	1.59	18	3	0	17.0	8	9	8	19	22
Caleb Freeman	0	0	5.40	1.80	5	0	0	3.1	5	2	2	1	3
Tyler Gilbert	4	2	3.88	1.23	46	5	1	51.0	40	24	22	24	49
Yoendrys Gómez	2	2	4.84	1.26	12	9	0	48.1	45	29	26	16	47
Wikelman González	1	0	2.66	1.23	16	0	0	20.1	13	9	6	12	25
Adrian Houser	6	2	2.10	1.22	11	11	0	68.2	62	19	16	22	47
Bryan Hudson	0	0	5.79	1.71	4	0	0	4.2	7	3	3	1	6
Jordan Leasure	5	6	3.92	1.23	68	1	**7**	64.1	49	30	28	30	81
Korey Lee	0	0	3.00	2.00	2	0	0	3.0	4	1	1	2	0
Davis Martin	**7**	10	4.10	1.29	26	25	0	142.2	**136**	74	65	48	104
Penn Murfee	0	1	7.82	1.90	15	0	0	12.2	19	11	11	5	13
Jake Palisch	0	0	18.00	3.00	1	0	0	1.0	3	2	2	0	0
Elvis Peguero	0	0	13.50	3.00	2	1	0	2.0	4	3	3	2	3
Martín Pérez	1	6	3.54	1.11	11	10	0	56.0	40	23	22	22	44
Jared Shuster	0	0	8.04	2.04	12	2	0	15.2	27	15	14	5	12
Shane Smith	**7**	8	3.81	1.20	29	**29**	0	**146.1**	117	70	62	58	**145**
Grant Taylor	2	4	4.91	1.42	36	2	6	36.2	37	20	20	15	54
Mike Vasil	5	3	2.50	1.29	47	3	4	101.0	74	32	28	52	82
Owen White	0	0	9.00	2.43	3	0	0	7.0	14	7	7	3	6
Bryse Wilson	0	2	6.65	1.82	20	5	0	47.1	67	37	35	19	28
Steven Wilson	2	2	3.42	1.30	59	0	2	55.1	50	21	21	22	51
**TEAM TOTALS**	60	102	4.26	1.36	162	162	25	1416.0	1336	742	671	595	1286

Note: No ERA qualifier or WHIP qualifier (162 IP minimum to qualify).

== Farm system ==
Level	Team	League	Manager
AAA	Charlotte Knights	International League	Sergio Santos
AA	Birmingham Barons	Southern League	Guillermo Quiróz
High-A	Winston-Salem Dash	South Atlantic League	Pat Leyland
A	Kannapolis Cannon Ballers	Carolina League	Chad Pinder
Rookie	ACL White Sox	Arizona Complex League	Danny Gonzalez
Rookie	DSL White Sox	Dominican Summer League	Wellington Morrobel; Anthony Nunez
