= Caleb Freeman =

American baseball player (born 1998)

Free agent
- Pitcher
- Born: February 23, 1998 (age 28); Abilene, Texas, U.S.
- Bats: Right Throws: Right

MLB debut
- May 5, 2025, for the Chicago White Sox

MLB statistics (through 2025 season)
- Win–loss record: 0–0
- Earned run average: 5.40
- Strikeouts: 3
- Stats at Baseball Reference

Teams
- Chicago White Sox (2025)

Caleb Aron Freeman (born February 23, 1998) is an American professional baseball pitcher who is a free agent. He has previously played in Major League Baseball (MLB) for the Chicago White Sox.

== Amateur career ==
Freeman attended Cooper High School in Abilene, Texas. He played college baseball for the Texas Tech Red Raiders, and in 2018 he played collegiate summer baseball for the Harwich Mariners of the Cape Cod Baseball League. A relief pitcher throughout his three seasons for the Red Raiders, he ended his junior year in 2019 2–0 with a 6.89 ERA over 15 2/3 innings. After the season, he was selected by the Chicago White Sox in the 15th round of the 2019 Major League Baseball draft. He signed for $25,000.

== Professional career ==
=== Chicago White Sox ===
Freeman spent his professional season in 2019 with the Rookie-level Arizona League White Sox, the Great Falls Voyagers of the Rookie Advanced Pioneer League, and the Kannapolis Intimidators of the Single-A South Atlantic League, going 4–2 with a 2.19 ERA and 38 strikeouts over 24 2/3 innings. He did not play a game in 2020 due to the cancellation of the minor league season because of the COVID-19 pandemic. For the 2021 season, he split the year between the Winston-Salem Dash of the High-A East and the Birmingham Barons of the Double-A South with whom he made 39 relief appearances and went 2–3 with a 3.27 ERA and 55 strikeouts over 44 innings. He was selected to play in the Arizona Fall League for the Glendale Desert Dogs where he was named to the Fall Stars game.

Freeman opened the 2022 season back with Birmingham, but missed nearly three months due to injury. Over 14 1/3 innings pitched with Birmingham, he posted an 8.79 ERA with 14 walks and 15 strikeouts. He returned to Birmingham to open the 2023 season and also spent time with the Charlotte Knights, posting a 3.71 ERA and 38 strikeouts over 34 innings for the season. Freeman returned to Birmingham for the entirety of the 2024 season, going 2-5 with a 3.92 ERA and 56 strikeouts over 43 2/3 innings.

Freeman was assigned to Birmingham to open the 2025 season, and was promoted to Charlotte in April. On May 4, 2025, the White Sox purchased Freeman's contract and added him to their active roster. He made his MLB debut the next day versus the Kansas City Royals. Freeman pitched one inning in relief in which he gave up one earned run and collected his first major league strikeout against Salvador Pérez. In five appearances for Chicago, he recorded a 5.40 ERA with three strikeouts across 3 1/3 innings pitched. Freeman was designated for assignment following the promotion of Jake Palisch on June 20. He cleared waivers and was sent outright to Triple-A Charlotte on June 23. Freeman elected free agency following the season on November 6.

=== Toronto Blue Jays ===
On February 24, 2026, Freeman signed with the Rieleros de Aguascalientes of the Mexican League. However, on March 10, Freeman signed a minor league contract with the Toronto Blue Jays. He pitched in 24 games for the Double–A New Hampshire Fisher Cats and Triple–A Buffalo Bisons, compiling a 4–0 record and 4.13 ERA with 37 strikeouts over 28 1/3 innings pitched. On August 4, Freeman was released by the Blue Jays.
