= Corbin Burnes =

American baseball player (born 1994)

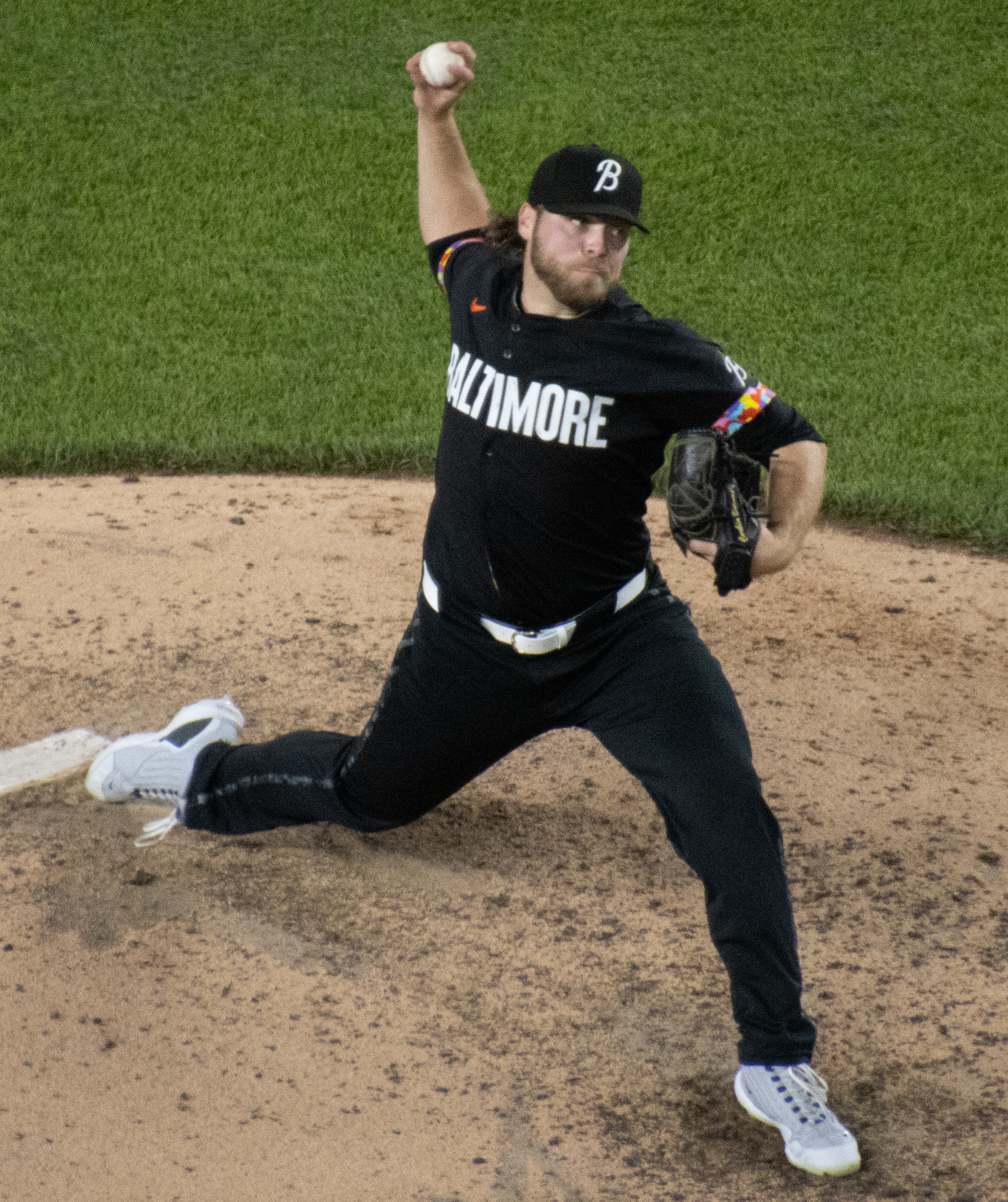
- Burnes with the Baltimore Orioles in 2024

Arizona Diamondbacks – No. 39
- Pitcher
- Born: October 22, 1994 (age 32); Bakersfield, California, U.S.
- Bats: Right Throws: Right

MLB debut
- July 10, 2018, for the Milwaukee Brewers

MLB statistics (through 2026 season)
- Win–loss record: 63–38
- Earned run average: 3.20
- Strikeouts: 1,122
- Stats at Baseball Reference

Teams
- Milwaukee Brewers (2018–2023); Baltimore Orioles (2024); Arizona Diamondbacks (2025–present)

Career highlights and awards
- 4× All-Star (2021–2024); NL Cy Young Award (2021); 2× All-MLB First Team (2021, 2024); NL ERA leader (2021); NL strikeout leader (2022); Pitched a combined no-hitter on September 11, 2021

Corbin Brian Burnes (born October 22, 1994) is an American professional baseball pitcher for the Arizona Diamondbacks of Major League Baseball (MLB). He has previously played in MLB for the Milwaukee Brewers and Baltimore Orioles.

Burnes was selected by the Brewers in the fourth round of the 2016 MLB draft, and made his MLB debut with them in 2018. He is a four-time All-Star, and won the National League (NL) Cy Young Award in 2021, after leading the NL in earned run average (ERA). He led the NL in strikeouts in 2022.

== Amateur career ==
Burnes attended Centennial High School in Bakersfield, California. In 2013, his senior year, he had a 9–4 win–loss record with a 2.23 earned run average (ERA) in 22 appearances. After high school, he enrolled and played college baseball at Saint Mary's College of California. In 2015, he played collegiate summer baseball with the Orleans Firebirds of the Cape Cod Baseball League. In 2016, his junior year, he posted a 9–2 record with a 2.48 ERA in 16 starts. After the season, he was drafted by the Milwaukee Brewers in the fourth round of the 2016 Major League Baseball draft.

== Professional career ==
=== Milwaukee Brewers ===
==== Minor leagues ====
Burnes made his professional debut with the Arizona League Brewers and was later promoted to the Wisconsin Timber Rattlers. In 35 2/3 innings pitched between Arizona and Wisconsin, Burnes posted a 3–0 record with a 2.02 ERA. He started the 2017 season with the Carolina Mudcats and was later promoted to the Biloxi Shuckers after recording a 1.05 ERA after ten starts. Burnes finished 2017 with a combined 8–3 record and 1.67 ERA between both teams. The Brewers named him their minor league pitcher of the year after the season.

MLB.com ranked Burnes as Milwaukee's second-best prospect going into the 2018 season. He began the season with the Colorado Springs Sky Sox.

==== 2018–2020 ====
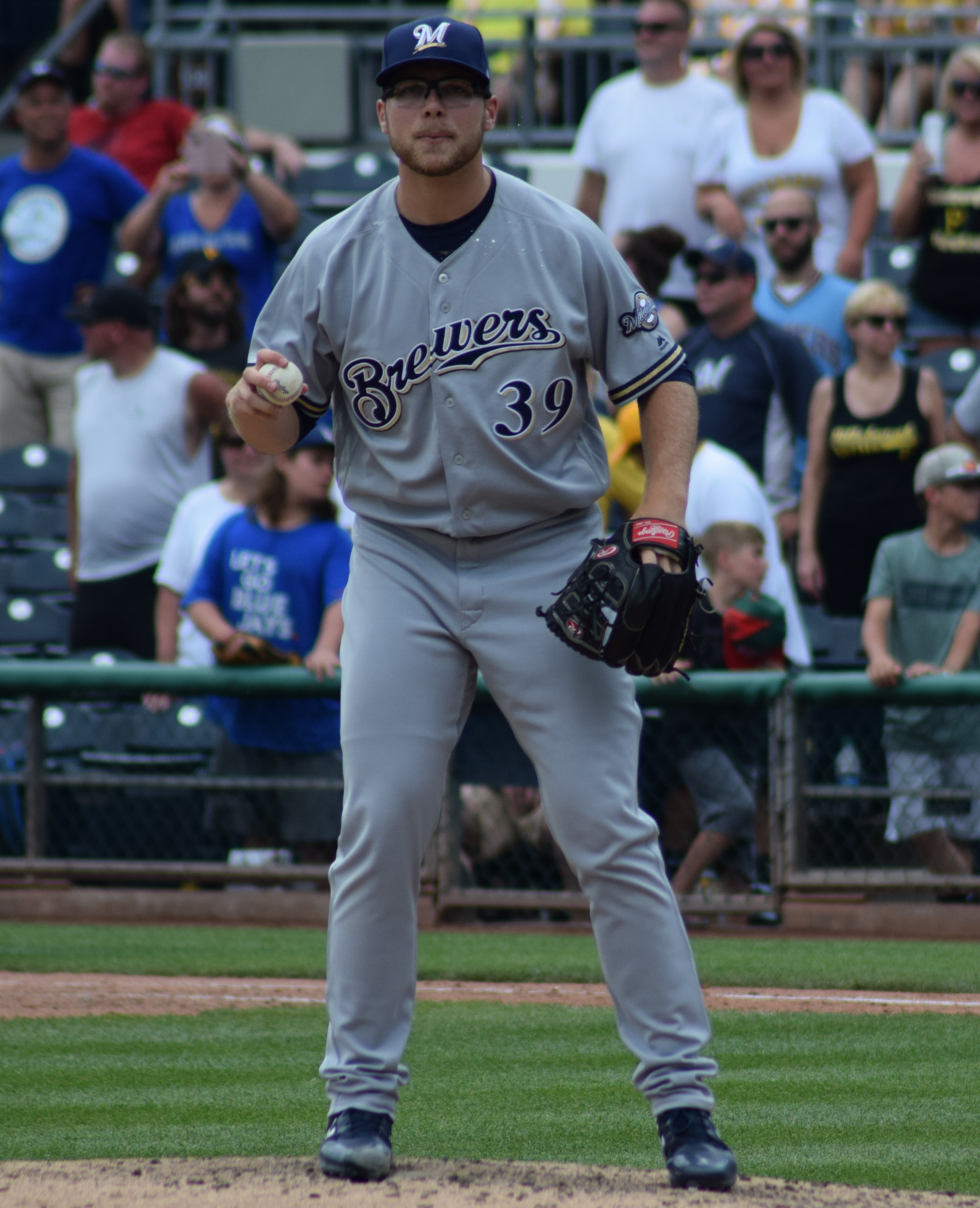
Burnes with the Brewers in 2018

The Brewers promoted Burnes to the majors for the first time on July 8, 2018. He made his major league debut on July 10, pitching two scoreless innings, striking out one, and recording his first major league save. In the 2018 NLDS against the Colorado Rockies, he pitched four scoreless innings in relief across two appearances, earning the win in the clinching 6–0 Game 3 victory. In the 2018 NLCS, Burnes got the last six outs of their game six win against the Dodgers.

To start 2019, Burnes began the year in the starting rotation. However, he struggled in that role, allowing 11 home runs across his first 3 starts. It was announced he would move back to the bullpen. He continued to struggle in the bullpen, compiling a 9.00 ERA through 26 appearances. He was placed on the injured list on July 15 with shoulder discomfort. He finished the season with a 1–5 record and an 8.82 ERA in 49 innings.

In the shortened 2020 season, Burnes pitched to a 4–1 record and recorded an ERA of 2.11 while striking out 88 batters in 59 2/3 innings. He finished 6th in the NL Cy Young voting.

==== 2021 ====
Burnes struck out 40 batters without issuing a walk in his first four starts of 2021, an unprecedented four game stretch for an MLB starting pitcher. On May 13, Burnes set the MLB record for the most strikeouts to begin a season before issuing a walk, with 58, surpassing the previous record of 51, held by Kenley Jansen. Burnes was named to the 2021 MLB All-Star Game. On August 12, Burnes tied an MLB record after striking out 10 consecutive batters in a game against the Chicago Cubs.

On September 11, Burnes pitched the first eight innings of a combined no-hitter with Josh Hader against the Cleveland Indians, in which he struck out 14 batters. He held a perfect game until a seventh-inning walk to Myles Straw. Burnes finished the 2021 season with an 11–5 record and led the major leagues in ERA (2.43), strikeouts per nine innings (12.6), home runs per nine innings (0.4), and strikeout-to-walk ratio (6.88). He won the National League Cy Young Award, becoming the third Brewers pitcher to win the award. He was also named to the first 2021 All-MLB Team as a starting pitcher.

Burnes was selected as the starter for Game 1 of the 2021 NLDS against the Atlanta Braves. Burnes pitched six shutout innings, striking out six.

==== 2022 ====
On March 22, 2022, Burnes signed a $6.5 million contract with the Brewers, avoiding salary arbitration. The Brewers named Burnes their Opening Day starting pitcher. He was named to the 2022 MLB All-Star Game.

In 2022, Burnes was 12–8 with a 2.94 ERA in 202 innings, and struck out a league-high 243 batters. On defense, he had a .961 fielding percentage. He was a finalist for the NL Gold Glove Award at pitcher, but it was won for the third straight season by Max Fried.

==== 2023 ====
Burnes went to salary arbitration with the Brewers, with the arbiter choosing the $10.01 million salary requested by the Brewers, rather than the $10.75 million requested by Burnes. He said that the process "definitely hurt" his relationship with the franchise. Burnes started for the Brewers on Opening Day. In 32 starts for Milwaukee, he posted a 10–8 record and 3.39 ERA with 200 strikeouts, and was named an All–Star for the third straight season.

=== Baltimore Orioles (2024) ===
On February 1, 2024, the Brewers traded Burnes to the Baltimore Orioles in exchange for DL Hall, Joey Ortiz, and a compensatory draft pick. Burnes made 32 starts for the Orioles in 2024, pitching to a 2.92 ERA and a 15-9 record with 181 strikeouts across 194^{1}/_{3} innings pitched. He also made his fourth consecutive All-Star team.

After the 2024 season, Burnes became a free agent. The Orioles extended the qualifying offer of $21.05 million for the 2025 season to Burnes, but he declined.

=== Arizona Diamondbacks ===
On December 30, 2024, Burnes signed a six-year, $210 million contract with the Arizona Diamondbacks. Burnes began the 2025 season pitching out of Arizona's rotation, posting a 3-2 record and 2.66 ERA with 63 strikeouts in 64 1/3 innings pitched over 11 starts. On June 1, 2025 against the Washington Nationals, Burnes left the game in the top of the fifth inning when he felt tightness in his elbow. Burnes underwent Tommy John surgery and missed the rest of the 2025 season.

On June 3, 2026, it was announced that Burnes would likely be sidelined three months after suffering a teres major strain during his rehabilitation. On September 8, Burnes was activated from the injured list for his season debut.

== Pitching style ==
Burnes is a power pitcher who has thrown six different pitches: a four-seam fastball between 94–97 miles per hour (151–156 km/h), a sinker between 95–97 miles per hour (153–156 km/h), a changeup between 88–91 miles per hour (142–146 km/h), a slider between 86–89 miles per hour (138–143 km/h), a curveball between 80–83 miles per hour (129–134 km/h), and a cut fastball between 93–96 miles per hour (150–154 km/h). He virtually abandoned his four-seamer after 2020 after finding far more success exclusively using his cutter. During spring training of 2024, Burnes broke out a second curveball, which he throws about 5 miles per hour (8.0 km/h) faster than his first, in strikeout situations.

== Personal life ==
Burnes is the son of Rick and Kandi Burnes.

Burnes and his wife Brooke married in 2020. They have three children including a pair of twins.

== See also ==
- List of Major League Baseball no-hitters
- List of Milwaukee Brewers award winners and All-Stars
- List of Milwaukee Brewers no-hitters
- List of people from Bakersfield, California

Awards and achievements
Preceded by Tyler Gilbert	No-hitter pitcher September 11, 2021 (with Josh Hader)	Succeeded by Tylor Megill; Drew Smith; Joely Rodríguez; Seth Lugo; Edwin Díaz
