= Everson Pereira =

Venezuelan baseball player (born 2001)

St. Louis Cardinals – No. 21
- Outfielder
- Born: April 10, 2001 (age 25); Cabudare, Venezuela
- Bats: Right Throws: Right

MLB debut
- August 22, 2023, for the New York Yankees

MLB statistics (through 2026 season)
- Batting average: .180
- Home runs: 7
- Runs batted in: 30
- Stats at Baseball Reference

Teams
- New York Yankees (2023); Tampa Bay Rays (2025); Chicago White Sox (2026); St. Louis Cardinals (2026–present)

Everson Jose Pereira (born April 10, 2001) is a Venezuelan professional baseball outfielder for the St. Louis Cardinals of Major League Baseball (MLB). He has previously played in MLB for the New York Yankees, Tampa Bay Rays, and Chicago White Sox. Pereira signed with the Yankees as an international free agent in 2017, and made his MLB debut in 2023.

== Career ==
=== New York Yankees ===
Pereira signed with the New York Yankees as an international free agent on July 2, 2017, for a $1.5 million signing bonus. He played at the Rookie-level in 2018 with the Pulaski Yankees, and missed most of the 2019 season, playing in 18 games for the Low-A Staten Island Yankees due to injuries to his foot and hamstring. Pereira did not play in a game in 2020 due to the cancellation of the minor league season because of the COVID-19 pandemic.

On November 19, 2021, the Yankees added Pereira to their 40-man roster to protect him from the Rule 5 draft. Pereira spent the 2022 season split between the High-A Hudson Valley Renegades and the Double-A Somerset Patriots, logging a combined .277/.350/.469 slash with 14 home runs, 56 RBI, and 21 stolen bases across 102 games.

Pereira began the 2023 season with Somerset. In July, the Yankees promoted Pereira to the Triple-A Scranton/Wilkes-Barre RailRiders. In 81 games between the two affiliates, he batted .300/.373/.548 with 18 home runs, 64 RBI, and 11 stolen bases. On August 22, 2023, the Yankees promoted Pereira to the major leagues for the first time, and he made his major league debut that day. In 27 games during his rookie campaign, he hit .151/.233/.194 with no home runs, 10 RBI, and 4 stolen bases.

Pereira was optioned to Triple–A Scranton to begin the 2024 season. In 40 games for Scranton, he batted .265/.346/.512 with 10 home runs, 27 RBI, and 5 stolen bases. On June 14, 2024, it was announced that Pereira would be undergoing season–ending UCL surgery.

Pereira was optioned to Triple-A Scranton/Wilkes-Barre to begin the 2025 season. On July 5, 2025, while playing for Scranton, Pereira recorded five hits, two home runs, and six RBI in a game that also saw him hit for the cycle. In 70 appearances for Scranton, he batted .254/.357/.507 with 19 home runs, 52 RBI, and nine stolen bases across 70 games.

=== Tampa Bay Rays ===
On July 31, 2025, the Yankees traded Pereira and a player to be named later to the Tampa Bay Rays in exchange for José Caballero. On August 29, Pereira hit his first career home run off of Mitchell Parker of the Washington Nationals. In 23 appearances for Tampa Bay, he batted .138/.219/.246 with two home runs, eight RBI, and two stolen bases.

=== Chicago White Sox ===
On November 18, 2025, the Rays traded Pereira and Tanner Murray to the Chicago White Sox in exchange for Yoendrys Gómez and Steven Wilson. He made 27 appearances for the White Sox, batting .225/.284/.438 with four home runs, 11 RBI, and one stolen base. On August 3, 2026, Pereira was designated for assignment by Chicago following the acquisition of Joey Bart.

=== St. Louis Cardinals ===
On August 6, 2026, Pereira was claimed off of waivers by the St. Louis Cardinals.
