= List of Milwaukee Brewers no-hitters =

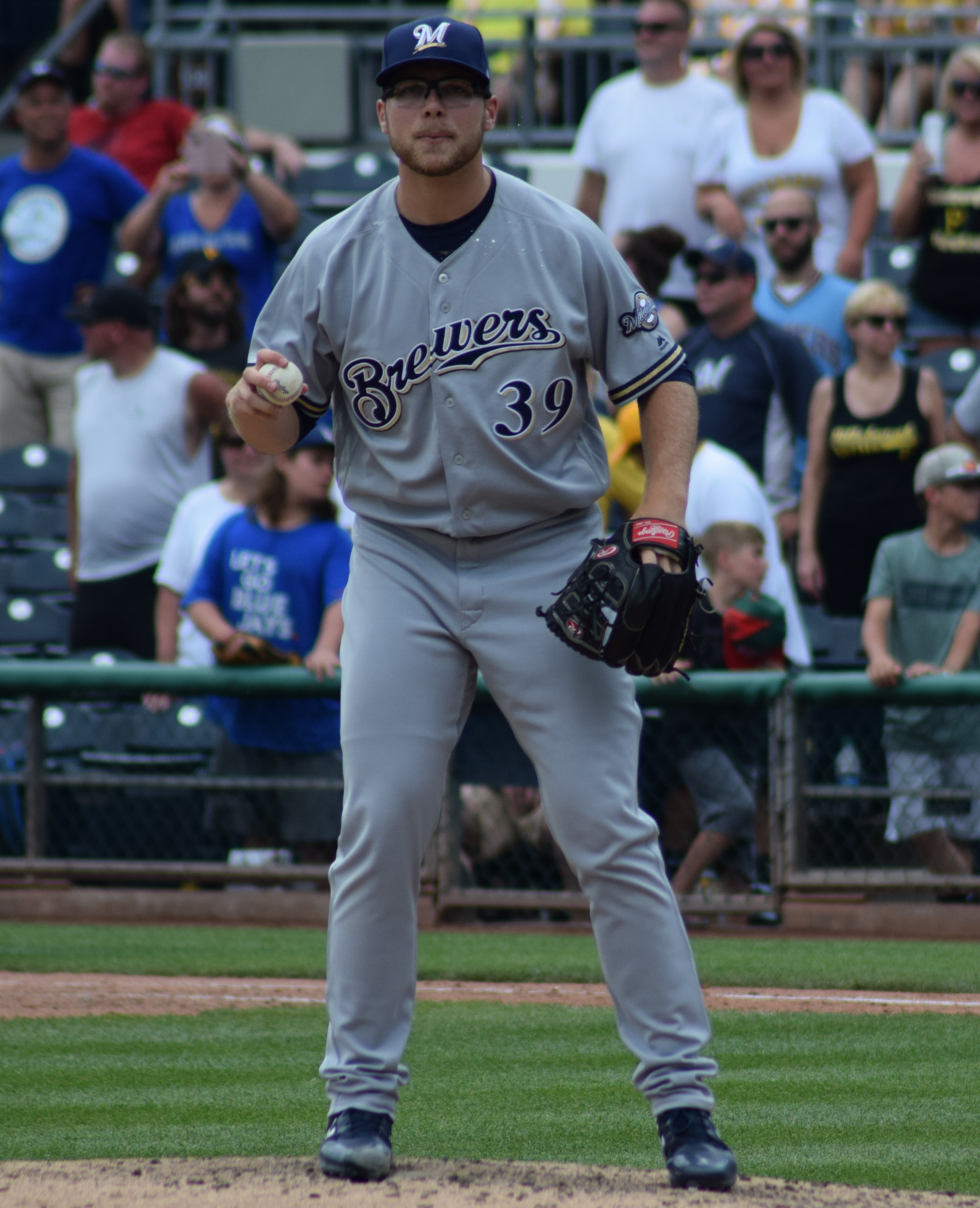
Corbin Burnes pitched the first 8 innings of the Brewers' second no-hitter on September 11, 2021.

The Milwaukee Brewers are a Major League Baseball (MLB) franchise based in Milwaukee, Wisconsin. Established in Seattle, Washington, as the Seattle Pilots in 1969, the team became the Milwaukee Brewers after relocating to Milwaukee in 1970. They play in the National League Central division. Pitchers for the Brewers have thrown two no-hitters in franchise history. A no-hitter is officially recognized by Major League Baseball only "when a pitcher (or pitchers) allows no hits during the entire course of a game, which consists of at least nine innings", though one or more batters "may reach base via a walk, an error, a hit by pitch, a passed ball or wild pitch on strike three, or catcher's interference". No-hitters of less than nine complete innings were previously recognized by the league as official; however, several rule alterations in 1991 meant the exclusion of no-hit games of less than nine innings. A perfect game, a much rarer feat, occurs when "no batter reaches any base during the course of the game."

Milwaukee's two no-hitters were accomplished by a total of three pitchers. One was a complete game pitched by a lone pitcher, and one was a combined no-hitter. Both have been pitched in road games, with none thrown at their home ballpark.

== History ==
The Brewers' first no-hitter was Juan Nieves' 7–0 win over the Baltimore Orioles on April 15, 1987, at Memorial Stadium in Baltimore, Maryland. Nieves walked five batters, accounting for all five base runners. He stuck out 7 of the 31 batters he faced and required 128 pitches to accomplish the feat. Nieves' teammates made several critical defensive plays to keep the no-hit bid intact. In the second inning, outfielder Jim Paciorek made a diving catch of Eddie Murray's line drive. Paul Molitor handled Cal Ripken Jr.'s hard liner to third base in the fourth inning. In the seventh, Dale Sveum turned Fred Lynn's sharply hit grounder into a double play. Robin Yount recorded the final out with a diving catch of another Murray liner in the ninth.

Pitchers Corbin Burnes (8 IP) and Josh Hader (1 IP) combined to no-hit the Cleveland Indians, 3–0, in Milwaukee's second no-hitter on September 11, 2021, at Progressive Field in Cleveland, Ohio. Burnes allowed no base runners through six innings before walking the lead-off hitter, Myles Straw, in the seventh. He exited the game after throwing 115 pitches through eight shutout innings and having struck out 14 of 25 batters. Closer Josh Hader came in for the ninth and required nine pitches to secure the no-hitter. He struck out two of three batters, including Straw, who had spoiled the perfect game bid, to end the game.

== No-hitters ==
Key
Score	Game score with Brewers runs listed first
BR	Number of base runners by the opposing team
£	Pitcher was left-handed
†	Perfect game

No-hitters
No.	Date	Pitcher	Score	BR	Opponent	Catcher	Plate umpire	Manager	Notes	Ref.
1	April 15, 1987	Juan Nieves^{£}	7–0	5	@ Baltimore Orioles	Bill Schroeder	Jim Evans	Tom Trebelhorn	First Brewers no-hitter; First Brewers no-hitter on the road; Largest margin of victory in a Brewers no-hitter (7 runs)	
2	September 11, 2021	Corbin Burnes (8 IP) Josh Hader^{£} (1 IP)	3–0	1	@ Cleveland Indians	Omar Narváez	Jeremie Rehak	Craig Counsell	First Brewers combined no-hitter; Smallest margin of victory in a Brewers no-hitter (3 runs)	
