= List of Arizona Diamondbacks no-hitters =

The Arizona Diamondbacks are a Major League Baseball franchise based in Phoenix, Arizona. Formed in 1998, they play in the National League West division. Pitchers for the Diamondbacks have thrown 3 no-hitters in franchise history. A no-hitter is officially recognized by Major League Baseball only "when a pitcher (or pitchers) allows no hits during the entire course of a game, which consists of at least nine innings", though one or more batters "may reach base via a walk, an error, a hit by pitch, a passed ball or wild pitch on strike three, or catcher's interference". No-hitters of less than nine complete innings were previously recognized by the league as official; however, several rule alterations in 1991 changed the rule to its current form. Randy Johnson threw the first and only perfect game, a special subcategory of no-hitter, in Diamondbacks history on May 18, 2004. As defined by Major League Baseball, "in a perfect game, no batter reaches any base during the course of the game."

The umpire is also an integral part of any no-hitter. The task of the umpire in a baseball game is to make any decision "which involves judgment, such as, but not limited to, whether a batted ball is fair or foul, whether a pitch is a strike or a ball, or whether a runner is safe or out… [the umpire's judgment on such matters] is final." Part of the duties of the umpire making calls at home plate includes defining the strike zone, which "is defined as that area over homeplate (sic) the upper limit of which is a horizontal line at the midpoint between the top of the shoulders and the top of the uniform pants, and the lower level is a line at the hollow beneath the kneecap." These calls define every baseball game and are therefore integral to the completion of any no-hitter.

The manager is another integral part of any no-hitter. The tasks of the manager include determining the starting rotation as well as batting order and defensive lineup every game.

== List of no-hitters in Diamondbacks history ==
¶	Indicates a perfect game
£	Pitcher was left-handed
*	Member of the National Baseball Hall of Fame and Museum

#	Date	Pitcher	Final score	Base- runners	Opponent	Catcher	Plate umpire	Manager	Notes	Ref
1	May 18, 2004	Randy Johnson^{£¶*}	2–0	0	@ Atlanta Braves	Robby Hammock	Greg Gibson	Bob Brenly	First no-hitter in franchise history; First and only perfect game in franchise history; First Diamondbacks no-hitter on the road; First left-handed pitcher to throw a no-hitter in franchise history; Johnson threw his previous no-hitter almost fourteen years earlier with the Mariners; See also: Randy Johnson's perfect game	
2	June 25, 2010	Edwin Jackson	1–0	10	@ Tampa Bay Rays	Miguel Montero	Adrian Johnson	A. J. Hinch	First and only right-handed pitcher to throw a no-hitter in franchise history; The Rays became the first team since the 2001 Padres to be no-hit twice in a season, and the first team in history to be no-hit three times within a one-year span	
3	August 14, 2021	Tyler Gilbert^{£}	7–0	3	vs San Diego Padres	Daulton Varsho	Scott Barry	Torey Lovullo	Most recent no-hitter in franchise history; First Diamondbacks no-hitter thrown at home (Chase Field); Gilbert's first MLB start in his career; The second no-hitter ever to include a 3-pitch inning (8th inning)	
