= Tanner Murray =

American baseball player (born 1999)

Chicago White Sox – No. 41
- Infielder
- Born: September 3, 1999 (age 27); Santa Clara, California, U.S.
- Bats: Right Throws: Right

MLB debut
- April 5, 2026, for the Chicago White Sox

MLB statistics (through 2026 season)
- Batting average: .214
- Home runs: 1
- Runs batted in: 3
- Stats at Baseball Reference

Teams
- Chicago White Sox (2026–present)

Tanner Kane Murray (born September 3, 1999) is an American professional baseball infielder for the Chicago White Sox of Major League Baseball (MLB). He made his MLB debut in 2026.

== Career ==
=== Amateur ===
Murray attended San Lorenzo Valley High School in Felton, California and played college baseball at the University of California, Davis. In 2019, he played collegiate summer baseball with the Orleans Firebirds of the Cape Cod Baseball League. As a junior in 2020, he hit .310 with one home run, eight RBI, and seven doubles in 16 games.

=== Tampa Bay Rays ===
Murray was selected by the Tampa Bay Rays in the fourth round (125th overall) of the 2020 Major League Baseball draft.

Murray made his professional debut in 2021, hitting .329 with four home runs and 33 RBI over 39 games with the Florida Complex League Rays, Charleston RiverDogs, and Bowling Green Hot Rods. He spent the 2022 season with Bowling Green, slashing .276/.322/412 with six home runs and 38 RBI in 66 games. Murray spent the majority of the 2023 campaign with the Double-A Montgomery Biscuits, also appearing in games for Bowling Green, the Triple-A Durham Bulls, and the FCL Rays. In 2024 with Montgomery, he slashed .290/.328/.424 with seven home runs and 66 RBI and was named the Rays’ Minor League Defensive Player of the Year. Murray spent the 2025 season with Durham, batting .241 with 18 homeruns and 58 RBI in 137 games played.

=== Chicago White Sox ===
On November 18, 2025, the Rays traded Murray and Everson Pereira to the Chicago White Sox in exchange for Steven Wilson and Yoendrys Gómez; he was subsequently added to Chicago's 40-man roster. Murray was optioned to the Triple-A Charlotte Knights to begin the 2026 season. On April 5, 2026, Murray was selected to the 40-man roster and promoted to the major leagues for the first time. He played in 13 games for Chicago, slashing .214/.281/.321 with one home run and three RBI. On April 27, it was announced that Murray had suffered a dislocation and shoulder fracture, necessitating surgery and a 4-to-6 month recovery timetable.
