= Tyler Gilbert =

American baseball player (born 1993)

Free agent
- Pitcher
- Born: December 22, 1993 (age 32); Santa Cruz, California, U.S.
- Bats: Left Throws: Left

MLB debut
- August 3, 2021, for the Arizona Diamondbacks

MLB statistics (through 2026 season)
- Win–loss record: 6–9
- Earned run average: 4.41
- Strikeouts: 121
- Stats at Baseball Reference

Teams
- Arizona Diamondbacks (2021–2023); Philadelphia Phillies (2024); Chicago White Sox (2025–2026)

Career highlights and awards
- Pitched a no-hitter in his first MLB start on August 14, 2021

Tyler Gregory Gilbert (born December 22, 1993) is an American professional baseball pitcher who is a free agent. He has previously played in Major League Baseball (MLB) for the Arizona Diamondbacks, Philadelphia Phillies, and Chicago White Sox. Gilbert was selected by the Phillies in the sixth round of the 2015 MLB draft, and made his MLB debut in 2021 with the Diamondbacks. In his first MLB start, on August 14, 2021, he threw a no-hitter.

== Early life ==
Tyler Gregory Gilbert was born on December 22, 1993, in Santa Cruz, California. Gilbert grew up in Felton, California. His aunt worked for the San Francisco Giants of Major League Baseball (MLB) and Gilbert often got club seating at Giants games.

Gilbert attended San Lorenzo Valley High School in Felton.

== College career ==
Gilbert enrolled at Santa Barbara City College (SBCC), where he began his college baseball career with the SBCC Vaqueros. In 2013, his sophomore year, he pitched to a 9–2 win–loss record and a 2.43 earned run average (ERA). Gilbert was named the Western State Conference's pitcher of the year for the North Division. In 2014, he was 6–5, with a 3.81 ERA.

After two seasons at SBCC, Gilbert transferred to the University of Southern California (USC) and continued his college baseball career with the USC Trojans. He had a 5–2 record and a 2.79 ERA with two saves in 67 2/3 innings pitched, and also starting six games.

== Professional career ==
=== Philadelphia Phillies ===
The Philadelphia Phillies selected Gilbert in the sixth round, with the 174th overall selection, of the 2015 Major League Baseball draft. He signed with the Phillies, who assigned him to the Williamsport Crosscutters of the Low-A New York-Penn League in 2015. Gilbert had a 4–3 win–loss record and a 2.79 ERA with Williamsport. He pitched for the Lakewood BlueClaws of the Single-A South Atlantic League in 2016, and finished the season with a 7–9 win–loss record and a 3.98 ERA. In 2017, Gilbert pitched for the Clearwater Threshers of the High-A Florida State League, and he was 1–6 and pitched to a 2.95 ERA.

Gilbert began the 2018 season with the Reading Fightin Phils of the Double-A Eastern League. He had played as a starting pitcher until his promotion to Reading, when he became a relief pitcher. With Reading in 2018, Gilbert pitched to a 2.86 ERA. He received a midseason promotion to the Lehigh Valley IronPigs of the Triple-A International League, with whom he had a 3.63 ERA. After the 2018 season, Gilbert pitched for the Tigres del Licey of the Dominican Professional Baseball League, with whom he had a 3.68 ERA. Gilbert returned to Lehigh Valley in 2019, and pitched to a 2–4 record with a 2.83 ERA during the 2019 season.

=== Arizona Diamondbacks ===
On February 5, 2020, the Phillies traded Gilbert to the Los Angeles Dodgers for Kyle Garlick. He played for the Dodgers during spring training in 2020 before the cancellation of the 2020 minor league season due to the COVID-19 pandemic.

On December 12, 2020, the Arizona Diamondbacks selected Gilbert from the Dodgers organization in the minor league phase of the Rule 5 draft. He began the 2021 season with the Reno Aces of Triple-A West, and pitched to a 5–2 win–loss record and a 3.44 ERA with 50 strikeouts in 52 1/3 innings.

==== Major leagues ====
The Diamondbacks promoted Gilbert to the major leagues on August 3. He made his major league debut that night, throwing an inning as a relief pitcher without allowing a run.

On August 14, 2021, at Chase Field, in a 7–0 win over the San Diego Padres, Gilbert made his first career Major League start and threw a no-hitter. He struck out five batters, walked three and threw 64 of 102 pitches for strikes. Gilbert became the fourth pitcher to throw a no-hitter in his first major league start, and the first since Bobo Holloman in 1953. It was the third no-hitter in Diamondbacks history, the first since Edwin Jackson's no-hitter in 2010, and the first at Chase Field. His no-hitter was also the eighth of the MLB season, tying the single-season record set in 1884. He finished the 2021 season with a 2–2 record and a 3.15 ERA.

In 2022, Gilbert made eight appearances (seven starts) for Arizona, registering an 0–3 record and 5.24 ERA with 20 strikeouts in 34 1/3 innings pitched. He pitched as well for the Reno Aces in Triple–A. With them, in 11 games (10 starts) he was 4–4 with a 7.57 ERA, as in 44 innings he had 26 strikeouts, and gave up 24 walks and 55 hits. On August 3, 2022, Gilbert was placed on the 60-day injured list with a left elbow sprain. On December 15, Gilbert was designated for assignment following the signing of Scott McGough. He cleared waivers and was sent outright to Triple-A on December 23.

Gilbert began the 2023 season with Triple–A Reno, making 21 appearances and logging a 6–3 record and 5.67 ERA with 65 strikeouts in 54.0 innings of work. On July 8, 2023, the Diamondbacks selected Gilbert's contract, adding him to the major league roster. In 11 games for Arizona, he posted an 0-2 record and 5.19 ERA with 19 strikeouts across 17 1/3 innings of work. Following the season on November 6, Gilbert was removed from the 40–man roster and sent outright to Triple–A Reno; he subsequently elected free agency the same day.

=== Cincinnati Reds ===
On January 17, 2024, Gilbert signed a minor league contract with the Cincinnati Reds. In 7 games (3 starts) for the Triple–A Louisville Bats, Gilbert struggled to a 13.11 ERA with 13 strikeouts and 24 hits across 11 2/3 innings pitched.

=== Philadelphia Phillies (second stint) ===
On May 7, 2024, the Reds traded Gilbert to the Philadelphia Phillies in exchange for cash, and the Phillies assigned him to the Lehigh Valley IronPigs of the Triple-A International League. In 27 games for Lehigh Valley, he compiled a 2.06 ERA with 48 strikeouts and 7 saves over 35 innings of work. On August 17, the Phillies selected Gilbert's contract, adding him to their active roster. In 6 appearances for Philadelphia, he posted a 3.24 ERA with 4 strikeouts across 8 1/3 innings pitched. Gilbert was designated for assignment following the acquisition of Jesús Luzardo on December 22.

=== Chicago White Sox ===
On January 1, 2025, the Phillies traded Gilbert to the Chicago White Sox in exchange for Aaron Combs. He made 46 appearances (including five starts) for Chicago during the regular season, compiling a 4–2 record and 3.88 ERA with 49 strikeouts and one save across 51 innings pitched.

Gilbert appeared in five games for the White Sox in 2026, but struggled to a 12.00 ERA with four strikeouts over six innings of work. On September 1, 2026, Gilbert was designated for assignment by Chicago. He cleared waivers and was sent outright to the Triple–A Charlotte Knights on September 3. He elected free agency on November 2.

== Pitching style ==
Gilbert is a sidearm pitcher, but he used a three-quarters delivery while with the Diamondbacks. Gilbert throws five pitches: a sinker, a sweeper, a cutter, a four-seam fastball, and a splitter.

== Personal life ==
Gilbert was born in Santa Cruz, California. Following the cancellation of the 2020 minor league season, Gilbert worked alongside his father as an electrician.

== See also ==
- List of Major League Baseball no-hitters
- Rule 5 draft results

Awards and achievements
| Preceded by Zach Davies, Ryan Tepera, Andrew Chafin, Craig Kimbrel (combined) | No-hitter pitcher August 14, 2021 | Succeeded by Corbin Burnes, Josh Hader (combined) |
