= Cam Booser =

American baseball player (born 1992)

Tampa Bay Rays – No. 62
- Pitcher
- Born: May 4, 1992 (age 34); Seattle, Washington, U.S.
- Bats: Left Throws: Left

MLB debut
- April 19, 2024, for the Boston Red Sox

MLB statistics (through 2026 season)
- Win–loss record: 5–7
- Earned run average: 3.45
- Strikeouts: 123
- Stats at Baseball Reference

Teams
- Boston Red Sox (2024); Chicago White Sox (2025); Tampa Bay Rays (2026–present)

Cameron Joseph Booser (born May 4, 1992) is an American professional baseball pitcher for the Tampa Bay Rays of Major League Baseball (MLB). He has previously played in MLB for the Boston Red Sox and Chicago White Sox.

== Early life ==
Booser attended Fife High School in Fife, Washington, and played for the school's baseball team as a pitcher and first baseman. He was named his league's most valuable player in 2009. Booser broke his femur during his sophomore year of high school while playing football, requiring knee surgery. He also broke a vertebra when he was a senior while lifting weights. Booser enrolled at Oregon State University to play college baseball for the Oregon State Beavers. Booser had Tommy John surgery during his freshman year of college and transferred to Central Arizona College.

== Professional career ==
=== Minnesota Twins ===
The Minnesota Twins signed Booser as an undrafted free agent on August 12, 2013. He made his professional debut that same year with the GCL Twins of the Gulf Coast League. In 2014, Booser pitched for the Elizabethton Twins of the Rookie-level Appalachian League. In 19 relief appearances he pitched to a 1–5 win-loss record in 31 1/3 innings pitched. Booser spent the 2015 season with the Single-A Cedar Rapids Kernels. He had surgery in August 2015 to correct a labrum tear. In December 2015, his sacrum was broken when he was hit by a car.

Booser split the 2016 campaign between Cedar Rapids and the High–A Fort Myers Miracle. In 21 appearances out of the bullpen for the two affiliates, he compiled an 0–4 record and 8.53 ERA with 31 walks and 34 strikeouts across 25 1/3 innings pitched.

In 2017, Booser was suspended 50 games after testing positive for cannabis. After making three appearances for Fort Myers during the season, Booser retired on November 20, 2017. Booser returned to the Seattle area to work as a carpenter. Missing baseball, he began to give pitching lessons in 2020, and found that he could throw a fastball at 96 miles per hour (154 km/h).

=== Chicago Dogs ===
On July 4, 2021, Booser came out of retirement to sign with the Chicago Dogs of the American Association of Professional Baseball, an independent league baseball league. He posted a 1–2 record and 1.93 earned run average (ERA) with 10 walks and 39 strikeouts across 23 1/3 innings pitched.

=== Arizona Diamondbacks ===
On February 16, 2022, Booser signed a minor league contract with the Arizona Diamondbacks. He pitched for the Amarillo Sod Poodles of the Double-A Texas League, and was released on July 18. With the Sod Poodles, Booser pitched to a 1–1 record and 6.48 ERA with 22 walks and 30 strikeouts in 25 innings over 19 relief appearances.

=== Lancaster Barnstormers ===
On August 8, 2022, Booser signed with the Staten Island FerryHawks of the Atlantic League of Professional Baseball, and was traded to the Lancaster Barnstormers the next day. In 23 games for Lancaster, Booser posted a 4.63 ERA with 12 hits, six walks, and 15 strikeouts across 11 2/3 innings pitched.

=== Boston Red Sox ===
On February 6, 2023, Booser signed with the Boston Red Sox. He pitched for the Worcester Red Sox of the Triple–A International League, logging a 4–3 record and 4.99 ERA with 66 strikeouts across 48 relief outings.

In 2024, the Red Sox invited him to spring training as a non-roster player. On April 19, 2024, Booser was selected to the 40-man roster and promoted to the major leagues for the first time. He made his major-league debut that evening, pitching the ninth inning of the Red Sox 8–1 win against the Pittsburgh Pirates. Booser was optioned to Triple-A Worcester on June 24 and recalled to Boston on July 5 after reliever Chris Martin was placed on the injured list.

Booser finished the 2024 season 2–3 with a 3.38 ERA and 43 strikeouts in 43 relief appearances for Boston. The Red Sox named him the winner of the Tony Conigliaro Award for the season, which recognizes a "Major Leaguer who has overcome adversity through the attributes of spirit, determination, and courage." He finished his season with Worcester 2–2 with a 5.91 ERA in eight games.

=== Chicago White Sox ===
On December 21, 2024, the Red Sox traded Booser to the Chicago White Sox in exchange for minor league pitcher Yhoiker Fajardo. He made 39 appearances for the White Sox in 2025, compiling a 2–4 record and 5.52 ERA with 35 strikeouts and one save over 31 innings of work. On November 21, 2025, Booser was non-tendered by Chicago and became a free agent.

=== Tampa Bay Rays ===
On January 26, 2026, Booser signed a minor league contract with the Tampa Bay Rays. On March 25, the Rays selected Booser's contract and subsequently optioned him to the Triple-A Durham Bulls.
