= Will Robertson (baseball) =

American baseball player (born 1997)

Free agent
- Outfielder
- Born: December 26, 1997 (age 28); Loose Creek, Missouri, U.S.
- Bats: Left Throws: Left

MLB debut
- June 15, 2025, for the Toronto Blue Jays

MLB statistics (through 2025 season)
- Batting average: .129
- Home runs: 0
- Runs batted in: 9
- Stats at Baseball Reference

Teams
- Toronto Blue Jays (2025); Chicago White Sox (2025)

Jonathan William Robertson (born December 26, 1997) is an American professional baseball outfielder who is a free agent. He has previously played in Major League Baseball (MLB) for the Toronto Blue Jays and Chicago White Sox.

== Career ==
=== Amateur ===
Robertson attended Fatima High School in Westphalia, Missouri, graduating in 2016. He enrolled at Creighton University, where he played college baseball for the Creighton Bluejays. In 2018, he played collegiate summer baseball with the Cotuit Kettleers of the Cape Cod Baseball League.

=== Toronto Blue Jays ===
The Toronto Blue Jays drafted Robertson in the fourth round, with the 117th overall selection, of the 2019 Major League Baseball draft. He made his professional debut with the Low-A Vancouver Canadians, hitting .268/.365/.404 with six home runs, 33 RBI, and one stolen base across 61 games. Robertson did not play in a game in 2020 due to the cancellation of the minor league season because of the COVID-19 pandemic.

Robertson returned to action in 2021 with the rookie-level Florida Complex League Blue Jays and Vancouver. In 60 appearances for the two affiliates, he slashed a combined .239/.323/.402 with six home runs, 31 RBI, and three stolen bases. Robertson split the 2022 season between the FCL Blue Jays, Single-A Dunedin Blue Jays, and Double-A New Hampshire Fisher Cats, hitting .227/.299/.433 with 15 home runs and 46 RBI across 96 total appearances.

In 2023, Robertson made 103 appearances for New Hampshire, slashing .245/.323/.488 with 19 home runs, 57 RBI, and nine stolen bases. He played in 119 games for the Triple-A Buffalo Bisons during the 2024 season, batting .226/.319/.429 with 19 home runs and 71 RBI. Robertson began the 2025 season back with Buffalo.

On June 11, 2025, Robertson was selected to the 40-man roster and promoted to the major leagues for the first time. He debuted for the Blue Jays on June 15. In three games for Toronto, Robertson went 1-for-10 (.100) with one RBI and one walk. Robertson was designated for assignment by the Blue Jays on July 6.

=== Chicago White Sox ===
On July 10, 2025, the Blue Jays traded Robertson to the Chicago White Sox in exchange for cash considerations. Robertson made 24 appearances down the stretch for Chicago, hitting .133/.159/.150 with eight RBI.

=== Baltimore Orioles ===
On October 13, 2025, Robertson was claimed off waivers by the Pittsburgh Pirates. On December 5, Robertson was claimed off waivers by the Baltimore Orioles. He was designated for assignment following the signing of Zach Eflin on December 28. Robertson cleared waivers and was sent outright to Triple-A Norfolk Tides on January 9, 2026. He played in 14 games for Norfolk and the rookie–level Florida Complex League Orioles, posting a cumulative .136/.283/.159 batting line with four RBI. Robertson was released by the Orioles organization on July 4.
