= Mike Vasil =

American baseball player (born 2000)

Chicago White Sox – No. 61
- Pitcher
- Born: March 19, 2000 (age 26); Boston, Massachusetts, U.S.
- Bats: Left Throws: Right

MLB debut
- March 31, 2025, for the Chicago White Sox

MLB statistics (through 2025 season)
- Win–loss record: 5–3
- Earned run average: 2.50
- Strikeouts: 82
- Stats at Baseball Reference

Teams
- Chicago White Sox (2025)

Michael Vasil (born March 19, 2000) is an American professional baseball pitcher for the Chicago White Sox of Major League Baseball (MLB). He made his MLB debut in 2025.

== Career ==
=== Amateur career ===
Vasil attended Boston College High School in Boston, Massachusetts. He was expected to be a high draft pick in the 2018 Major League Baseball draft but withdrew his name from the draft and opted to play college baseball at the University of Virginia. In 2019, he played collegiate summer baseball with the Orleans Firebirds of the Cape Cod Baseball League.

=== New York Mets ===
After three years at Virginia, Vasil was drafted by the New York Mets in the eighth round, with the 232nd overall selection, of the 2021 Major League Baseball draft.

Vasil made his professional debut in 2021 with the rookie-level Florida Complex League Mets, posting a 1.29 ERA and 10 strikeouts over 3 starts. He started 2022 with the Single-A St. Lucie Mets before being promoted to the High-A Brooklyn Cyclones, also appearing with the FCL Mets. In 18 games (17 starts) for the three affiliates, Vasil accumulated a 4–2 record and 3.53 ERA with 85 strikeouts across 71 1/3 innings pitched.

Vasil split 2023 between the Double-A Binghamton Rumble Ponies and Triple-A Syracuse Mets. In 26 starts split between the two affiliates, he compiled a 5–6 record and 4.65 ERA with 138 strikeouts across 124 innings pitched. Vasil spent the 2024 campaign with Syracuse, making 29 appearances (27 starts) and struggling to an 8–10 record and 6.04 ERA with 109 strikeouts over 134 innings of work.

=== Chicago White Sox ===
On December 11, 2024, Vasil was selected by the Philadelphia Phillies 14th overall in the Rule 5 draft. The same day, the Phillies traded him to the Tampa Bay Rays in exchange for cash or a player to be named later. On March 23, 2025, Vasil was claimed off waivers by the Chicago White Sox. On May 4, Vasil recorded his first career win after tossing a scoreless 2 1/3 innings against the Houston Astros. On May 14, he recorded his first career save after pitching a scoreless ninth inning against the Cincinnati Reds. Vasil made 47 total appearances (including three starts) for the White Sox during his rookie campaign, compiling a 5-3 record and 2.50 ERA with 82 strikeouts and four saves across 101 innings pitched.

On March 17, 2026, the White Sox announced that Vasil would require Tommy John surgery and miss the entirety of the season.

== See also ==
- Rule 5 draft
