= Steven Wilson (baseball) =

American baseball player (born 1994)

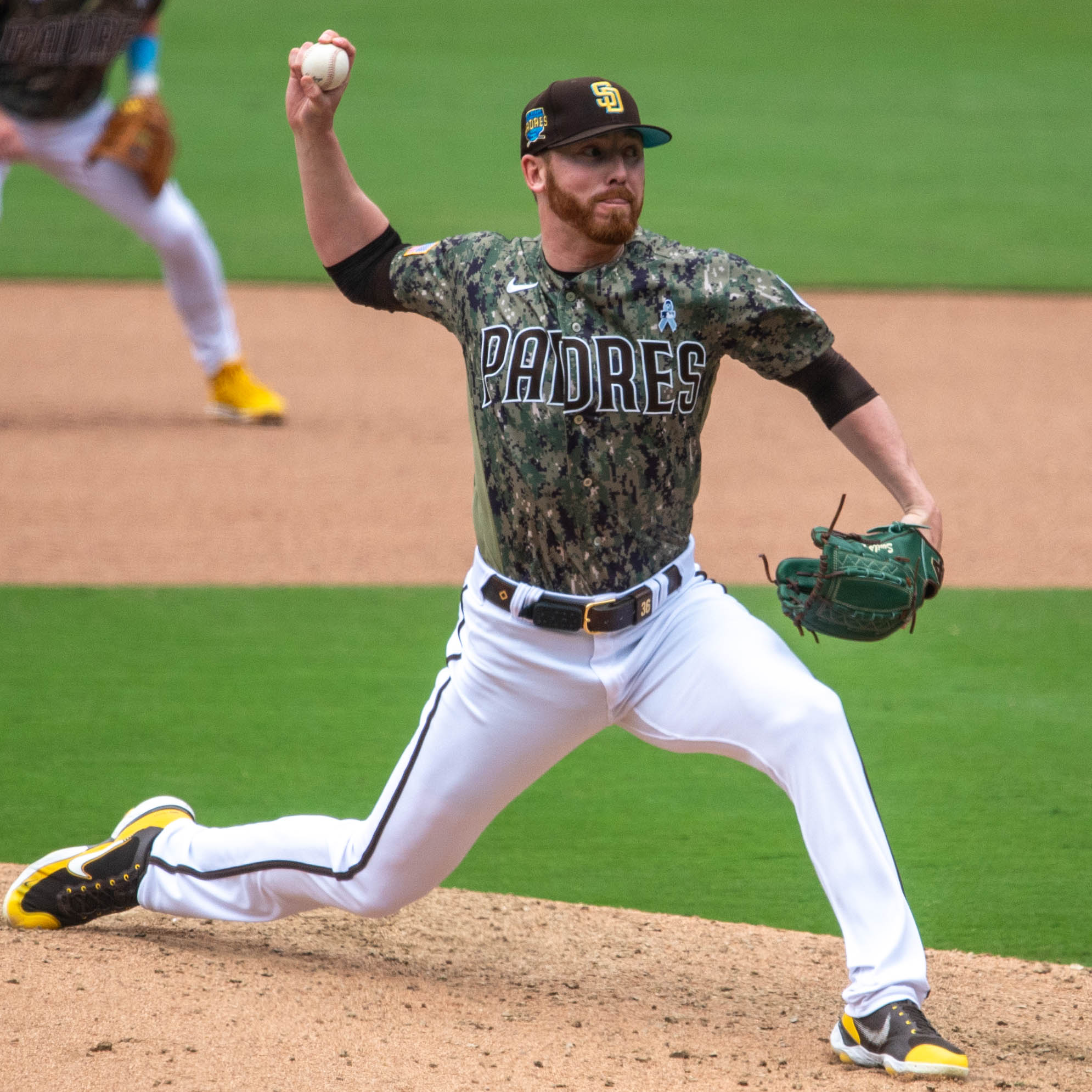
- Wilson pitching for the Padres in 2023

Free agent
- Pitcher
- Born: August 24, 1994 (age 32); Littleton, Colorado, U.S.
- Bats: Right Throws: Right

MLB debut
- April 9, 2022, for the San Diego Padres

MLB statistics (through 2025 season)
- Win–loss record: 8–12
- Earned run average: 3.86
- Strikeouts: 195
- Stats at Baseball Reference

Teams
- San Diego Padres (2022–2023); Chicago White Sox (2024–2025)

Steven Christopher Wilson (born August 24, 1994) is an American professional baseball pitcher who is a free agent. He has previously played in Major League Baseball (MLB) for the San Diego Padres and Chicago White Sox.

== Amateur career ==
Wilson attended Dakota Ridge High School in Littleton, Colorado. In 2012, as a senior, he went 7–1 with a 2.66 ERA while batting .462 with seven home runs. He was selected by the Philadelphia Phillies in the 35th round of the 2012 Major League Baseball draft, but did not sign and instead enrolled at Santa Clara University where he played college baseball.

Wilson redshirted his freshman year at Santa Clara in 2013. In 2017, he underwent Tommy John surgery, and was forced to redshirt once again. He returned to play in 2018 as a redshirt senior, pitching to a 4–1 record and a 3.07 ERA over 16 games (nine starts), striking out 58 batters over 44 innings.

== Professional career ==
=== San Diego Padres ===
After the 2018 college baseball season, Wilson was drafted by the San Diego Padres in the eighth round of the 2018 Major League Baseball draft, and signed for $5,000. After signing with the Padres, Wilson made his professional debut with the Lake Elsinore Storm of the High–A California League, but after two games was reassigned to the Tri-City Dust Devils of the Low–A Northwest League. Over eight innings pitched between the two clubs, he compiled a 7.88 ERA. In 2019, Wilson returned to Lake Elsinore to begin the year before being promoted to the El Paso Chihuahuas of the Triple–A Pacific Coast League, with whom he finished the season. Over 42 relief appearances between the two clubs, Wilson went 3–3 with a 2.67 ERA, striking out 85 over 64 innings. He did not play in a game in 2020 due to the cancellation of the minor league season because of the COVID-19 pandemic. That winter, Wilson played in the Dominican Professional Baseball League (LIDOM). To begin the 2021 season, Wilson returned to El Paso. He was placed on the injured list in mid-May and was activated in early July. Over thirty relief appearances, Wilson went 4–0 with a 3.21 ERA and 71 strikeouts over 42 innings. He returned to LIDOM after the season.

On November 19, 2021, the Padres added Wilson to the 40-man roster to protect him from the Rule 5 draft. He was named to the San Diego's Opening Day roster to start the 2022 season. Wilson made his MLB debut on April 9, throwing one scoreless inning of relief against the Arizona Diamondbacks. In 50 appearances during his rookie campaign, he compiled a 4-2 record and 3.06 ERA with 53 strikeouts across 53 innings pitched. Wilson pitched in 52 games for the Padres in 2022, registering a 1-2 record and 3.91 ERA with 57 strikeouts over 53 innings of work.

=== Chicago White Sox ===
On March 13, 2024, the Padres traded Wilson, Drew Thorpe, Jairo Iriarte, and Samuel Zavala to the Chicago White Sox in exchange for Dylan Cease. In 40 appearances for Chicago, he struggled to a 1-6 record and 5.71 ERA with 34 strikeouts across 34 2/3 innings pitched.

Wilson was designated for assignment by the White Sox on February 7, 2025. He cleared waivers and was sent outright to the Triple-A Charlotte Knights on February 11. On April 16, the White Sox selected Wilson's contract, adding him to their active roster. He made 59 appearances for Chicago, compiling a 2-2 record and 3.42 ERA with 51 strikeouts and two saves across 55 1/3 innings pitched.

=== Tampa Bay Rays ===
On November 18, 2025, the White Sox traded Wilson and Yoendrys Gómez to the Tampa Bay Rays in exchange for Everson Pereira and Tanner Murray. On March 25, 2026, Wilson was placed on the 60-day injured list due to lumbar disc inflammation. Upon being activated on August 6, Wilson was designated for assignment by the Rays. He cleared waivers and was sent outright to Triple-A Durham Bulls on August 9. He elected free agency on September 29.
