= Matt Thaiss =

American baseball player (born 1995)

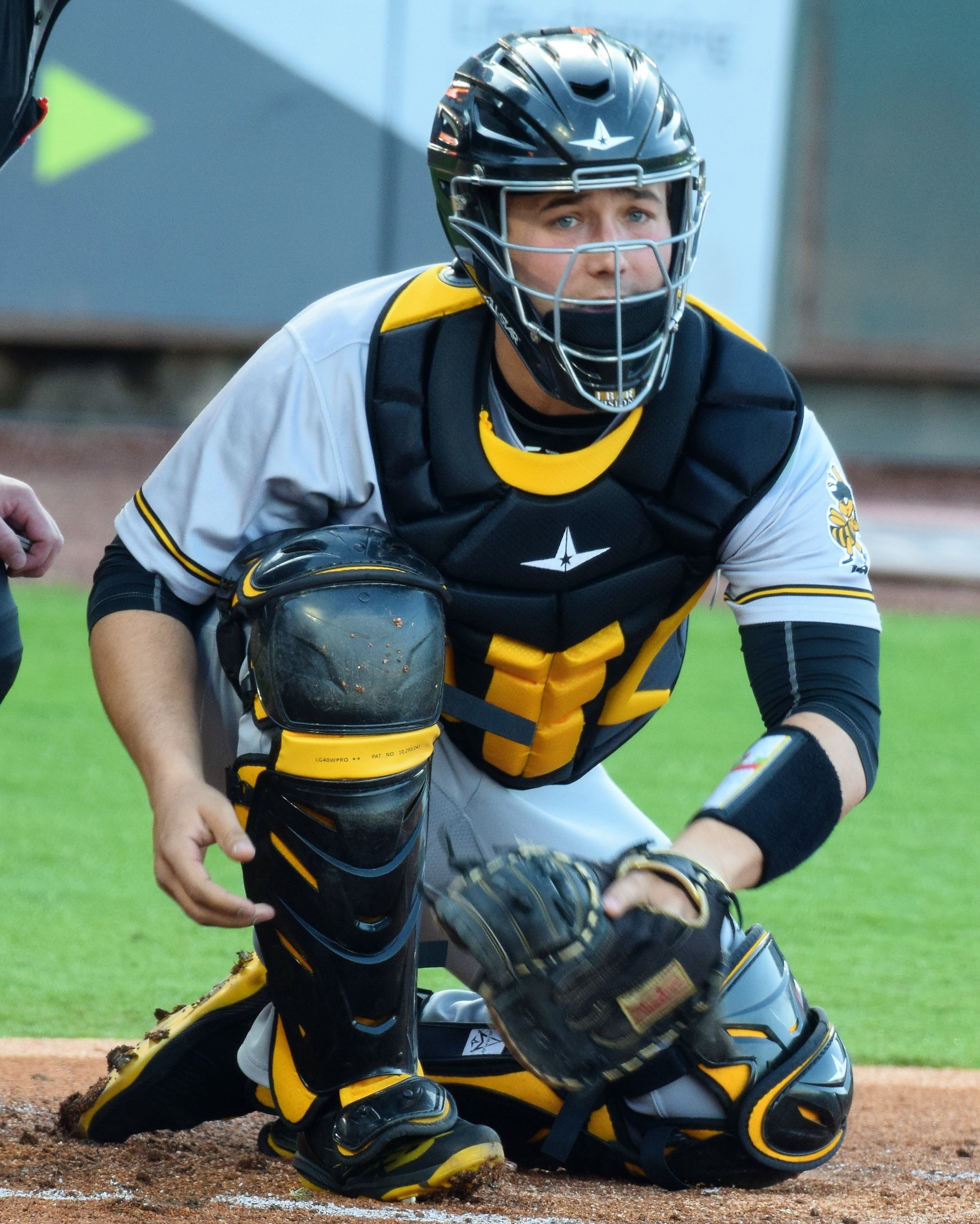
- Thaiss in 2022 with the Salt Lake Bees

Free agent
- Catcher
- Born: May 6, 1995 (age 31); Jackson, New Jersey, U.S.
- Bats: Left Throws: Right

MLB debut
- July 3, 2019, for the Los Angeles Angels

MLB statistics (through 2025 season)
- Batting average: .210
- Home runs: 23
- Runs batted in: 95
- Stats at Baseball Reference

Teams
- Los Angeles Angels (2019–2024); Chicago White Sox (2025); Tampa Bay Rays (2025)

Matthew Kevin Thaiss (born May 6, 1995) is an American professional baseball catcher who is a free agent. He has previously played in Major League Baseball (MLB) for the Los Angeles Angels, Chicago White Sox, and Tampa Bay Rays. He made his MLB debut in 2019.

== Amateur career ==
Thaiss attended Jackson Memorial High School in Jackson Township, New Jersey. During his career he batted .343 with 17 home runs and 70 runs batted in (RBI). He was drafted by the Boston Red Sox in the 32nd round of the 2013 Major League Baseball draft, but did not sign and attended the University of Virginia where he played for the Virginia Cavaliers.

As a freshman at Virginia in 2014, Thaiss played in 26 games with 16 starts at designated hitter. In 68 at-bats he hit .265 with seven RBIs. As a sophomore in 2015, Thaiss started 67 of 68 games, batting .323/.413/.552 with ten home runs and 64 RBIs. He played for the Hyannis Harbor Hawks of the Cape Cod Baseball League in the summer of 2015. In 2016, Thaiss played 60 games and batted .375/.473/.578 along with ten home runs.

== Professional career ==
=== Los Angeles Angels ===
The Los Angeles Angels selected Thaiss in the first round of the 2016 MLB draft, with the 16th overall pick. Thaiss signed with the Angels and was assigned to the Orem Owlz. After batting .338 with two home runs and 12 RBI in 15 games for Orem, he was promoted to the Burlington Bees, where he hit .276 with four home runs, 31 RBI, and a .778 OPS in 52 games to end the season. He was ranked as the Angels' top prospect at the end of the 2016 season. Thaiss spent 2017 with both the Inland Empire 66ers and the Mobile BayBears, posting a combined .274 batting average with nine home runs and 73 RBI in 133 games, and 2018 with Mobile and the Salt Lake Bees, slashing .280/.335/.467 with 16 home runs and 76 RBI in 125 games between both teams. He returned to Salt Lake to begin 2019.

On July 3, 2019, the Angels selected Thaiss' contract and promoted him to the major leagues. He made his major league debut that night, hitting a double in his first at-bat off of Ariel Jurado of the Texas Rangers. As he was a catcher before being drafted, he has converted into a first baseman and a third baseman after being drafted. On the season, Thaiss hit .211 with eight home runs in 53 games. In 2020, Thaiss went 3-for-21 with one home run for a .143/.280/.286 batting line across eight games.

In 2021, the Angels had Thaiss return to playing catcher.

Thaiss played in 57 games for the Angels in 2024, slashing .204/.323/.299 with two home runs, 16 RBI, and three stolen bases. Thaiss was designated for assignment by the team on November 14, 2024.

=== Chicago White Sox ===
On November 20, 2024, the Angels traded Thaiss to the Chicago Cubs in exchange for cash considerations. The Cubs traded Thaiss to the Chicago White Sox in exchange for cash considerations on December 17. He made 35 appearances for Chicago in 2025, batting .212/.382/.294 with one home run, eight RBI, and one stolen base.

=== Tampa Bay Rays ===
On May 27, 2025, the White Sox traded Thaiss to the Tampa Bay Rays in exchange for minor league prospect Dru Baker. In 25 appearances for Tampa Bay, he slashed .225/.304/.282 with eight RBI. Thaiss was designated for assignment by the Rays on August 1. He cleared waivers and was sent outright to the Triple-A Durham Bulls on August 4. Thaiss elected free agency on September 30.

=== Boston Red Sox ===
On January 31, 2026, Thaiss signed a minor league contract with the Boston Red Sox. He made 44 appearances for the Triple-A Worcester Red Sox, batting .201/.314/.313 with three home runs and 24 RBI. Thaiss was released by the Red Sox organization on July 14.

=== Houston Astros ===
On July 24, 2026, Thaiss signed a minor league contract with the Houston Astros. He made 13 appearances for the Triple–A Sugar Land Space Cowboys, hitting .209/.277/.302 with three RBI and four walks. Thaiss was released by the Astros organization on August 31.
