= Yoendrys Gómez =

Venezuelan baseball player (born 1999)

Minnesota Twins – No. 94
- Pitcher
- Born: October 15, 1999 (age 26); Nirgua, Venezuela
- Bats: Right Throws: Right

MLB debut
- September 28, 2023, for the New York Yankees

MLB statistics (through 2026 season)
- Win–loss record: 6–7
- Earned run average: 4.59
- Strikeouts: 137
- Stats at Baseball Reference

Teams
- New York Yankees (2023–2025); Los Angeles Dodgers (2025); Chicago White Sox (2025); Tampa Bay Rays (2026); Minnesota Twins (2026–present)
Medals
Men's baseball
Representing Venezuela
World Baseball Classic
Gold medal – first place	2026 Miami	Team

Yoendrys Adrian Gómez (born October 15, 1999) is a Venezuelan professional baseball pitcher for the Minnesota Twins of Major League Baseball (MLB). He has previously played in MLB for the New York Yankees, Los Angeles Dodgers, Chicago White Sox, and Tampa Bay Rays.

== Career ==
=== New York Yankees ===
Gómez signed with the New York Yankees organization as an international free agent on July 2, 2016. Gómez played his first professional season the following year, splitting the season between the Dominican Summer League Yankees and the rookie-level Gulf Coast League Yankees, pitching to a cumulative 0–3 record and 5.40 ERA in 11 games between the two teams. In 2018, Gómez returned to the two teams, recording a 4–1 record and 2.08 ERA in 12 appearances. In 2019, Gómez split the season between the rookie-level Pulaski Yankees and the Single-A Charleston RiverDogs, posting a 4–5 record and 3.99 ERA with 53 strikeouts in 56 1/3 innings of work. He did not play a minor league game in 2020 since the season was cancelled due to the COVID-19 pandemic. The Yankees added him to their 40-man roster after the 2020 season.

Gómez was assigned to the Single-A Tampa Tarpons to begin the 2021 season, posting a 3.42 ERA with 29 strikeouts across 9 starts before suffering a torn ulnar collateral ligament, which was repaired with an internal brace surgery in August 2021. Pitching for the Somerset Patriots in 2022, Gómez pitched the first five innings of a combined seven-inning no-hitter on September 7. After allowing one run in five innings pitched during spring training in 2023, the Yankees assigned Gómez to Double-A Somerset to begin the 2023 season. In 19 starts for Somerset, he logged a 3.58 ERA with 78 strikeouts in 65 1/3 innings of work.

On September 22, 2023, Gómez was promoted to the major leagues for the first time. He made his major league debut on September 28, tossing two scoreless innings against the Toronto Blue Jays. Gómez was optioned to the Triple–A Scranton/Wilkes-Barre RailRiders to begin the 2024 season.

Gómez made six appearances for the Yankees in 2025, recording a 2.70 ERA with five strikeouts over 10 innings of work. Gómez was designated for assignment by New York on April 22, 2025.

=== Los Angeles Dodgers ===
On April 25, 2025, Gómez was claimed off waivers by the Los Angeles Dodgers. He pitched 4 1/3 innings over three games and allowed seven runs on 10 hits before he was designated for assignment on May 6.

=== Chicago White Sox ===
On May 10, 2025, Gómez was claimed off waivers by the Chicago White Sox. On May 20, Gómez was designated for assignment by the White Sox. He cleared waivers and was sent outright to the Triple-A Charlotte Knights on May 23. On August 12, the White Sox added Gómez back to their active roster. He made 12 total appearances (nine starts) for Chicago, posting a 2-2 record and 4.84 ERA with 47 strikeouts across 48 1/3 innings pitched.

=== Tampa Bay Rays ===
On November 18, 2025, the White Sox traded Gómez and Steven Wilson to the Tampa Bay Rays in exchange for Everson Pereira and Tanner Murray. He made nine appearances for Tampa Bay, but struggled to a 6.23 ERA with 13 strikeouts and one save across 17 1/3 innings pitched. On May 2, 2026, Gómez was designated for assignment by the Rays.

=== Minnesota Twins ===
On May 6, 2026, Gómez was traded to the Minnesota Twins for cash considerations.
