= Shane Smith (baseball) =

American baseball player (born 2000)

Chicago White Sox – No. 64
- Pitcher
- Born: April 4, 2000 (age 26); Danvers, Massachusetts, U.S.
- Bats: Right Throws: Right

MLB debut
- April 1, 2025, for the Chicago White Sox

MLB statistics (through 2026 season)
- Win–loss record: 7–10
- Earned run average: 4.19
- Strikeouts: 156
- Stats at Baseball Reference

Teams
- Chicago White Sox (2025–present)

Career highlights and awards
- All-Star (2025)

Shane Jeffrey Smith (born April 4, 2000) is an American professional baseball pitcher for the Chicago White Sox of Major League Baseball (MLB). He made his MLB debut in 2025, and was named an All-Star the same season.

== Career ==
=== Amateur career ===
Smith attended The Governor's Academy in Byfield, Massachusetts, and Wake Forest University, where he played college baseball for the Wake Forest Demon Deacons. He underwent Tommy John surgery in 2021.

=== Milwaukee Brewers ===
After going unselected in the 2021 MLB draft, Smith signed with the Milwaukee Brewers as an undrafted free agent on July 27, 2021. He made his professional debut in 2022 with the rookie-level Arizona Complex League Brewers.

Smith split the 2023 season between the Single-A Carolina Mudcats, High-A Wisconsin Timber Rattlers, and Double-A Biloxi Shuckers. In 38 appearances for the three affiliates, he compiled a cumulative 7–4 win–loss record and a 1.96 earned run average (ERA) with 86 strikeouts and 10 saves across 59 2/3 innings pitched. While pitching for Biloxi in 2024, the Brewers named him their minor league pitcher of the month for May. In 32 total appearances for Biloxi and the Triple-A Nashville Sounds, Smith posted a 6–3 record and 3.05 ERA with 113 strikeouts across 94 1/3 innings pitched.

=== Chicago White Sox ===
On December 11, 2024, the Chicago White Sox selected Smith from the Brewers with the first selection of the Rule 5 draft. On March 20, 2025, the White Sox announced that Smith had made their Opening Day roster. He made his MLB debut on April 1. On April 24, Smith recorded his first career win after tossing five scoreless innings (with seven strikeouts) over the Minnesota Twins. On July 6, Smith was selected to the 2025 MLB All-Star Game, becoming only the second player—the first having been Dan Uggla in 2006—to be named an All-Star in the season following their Rule 5 selection. He finished the 2025 season with a 7–8 record and a 3.81 ERA in 146 1/3 innings pitched in 29 games started.

Smith started for the White Sox on Opening Day in 2026. After pitching to a 10.80 ERA in his first three starts, the White Sox optioned Smith to the Triple-A Charlotte Knights on April 8.

== See also ==
- Rule 5 draft results
