= Jake Palisch =

American baseball player (born 1998)

Chicago White Sox
- Pitcher
- Born: August 19, 1998 (age 28); Richardson, Texas, U.S.
- Bats: Left Throws: Left

MLB debut
- June 21, 2025, for the Chicago White Sox

MLB statistics (through 2025 season)
- Win–loss record: 0–0
- Earned run average: 18.00
- Strikeouts: 0
- Stats at Baseball Reference

Teams
- Chicago White Sox (2025)

Jacob Benjamin Palisch (born August 19, 1998) is an American professional baseball pitcher in the Chicago White Sox organization. He made his Major League Baseball (MLB) debut in 2025.

== Amateur career ==
A native of Richardson, Texas, Palisch played college baseball at Texas A&M University. In 2019, he played collegiate summer baseball with the Harwich Mariners of the Cape Cod Baseball League and was named a league all-star.

== Professional career ==
On July 31, 2022, Palisch signed with the Chicago White Sox as an undrafted free agent. He split his first professional season between the rookie-level Arizona Complex League White Sox and Single-A Kannapolis Cannon Ballers, making five scoreless appearances.

Palisch made 36 appearances out of the bullpen for the High-A Winston-Salem Dash in 2023, compiling a 1-2 record and 5.31 ERA with 50 strikeouts and three saves across 42 1/3 innings pitched. In 2024, he made 38 appearances for the Double-A Birmingham Barons, registering a 4-3 record and 3.75 ERA with 35 strikeouts across 50 1/3 innings pitched. Palisch returned to Birmingham to begin the 2025 season, posting a 4-1 record and 1.19 ERA with 35 strikeouts over 15 games (seven starts).

On June 20, 2025, Palisch was selected to the 40-man roster and promoted to the major leagues for the first time. He made his MLB debut the following day, allowing two runs on three hits in one inning of work against the Toronto Blue Jays. On June 30, Palisch was removed from the 40-man roster and sent outright to Double-A Birmingham.

In 2026, he played in 25 games (21 starts) with Double-A Birmingham Barons throwing 119 innings going 4-9 with a 4.92 ERA and 57 strikeouts.
