= Dodgers–Padres rivalry =

Major League Baseball rivalry

- Los Angeles Dodgers San Diego Padres
- Location: Southern California
- First meeting: April 15, 1969; Dodger Stadium, Los Angeles; Dodgers 14, Padres 0
- Latest meeting: September 24, 2026; Dodger Stadium, Los Angeles; Padres 4, Dodgers 2
- Next meeting: April 9, 2027; Petco Park, San Diego
- Stadiums: Dodgers: Dodger Stadium; Padres: Petco Park

Statistics
- Total meetings: 989
- All-time series: Dodgers, 547–441–1 (.554)
- Regular season series: Dodgers, 540–436–1 (.553)
- Postseason results: Dodgers, 7–5 (.583)
- Largest victory: Dodgers, 19–0 (June 28, 1969); Padres, 12–0 (July 30, 1984; June 14, 1986); 14–2 (June 10, 1993)
- Longest win streak: Dodgers, 16 (September 9, 1973–September 20, 1974); Padres, 10 (September 22, 1996–June 28, 1997)
- Current win streak: Padres, 2

Post-season history
- 2020 NL Division Series: Dodgers won, 3–0; 2022 NL Division Series: Padres won, 3–1; 2024 NL Division Series: Dodgers won, 3–2

Locations of the Los Angeles Dodgers and San Diego Padres

The Dodgers–Padres rivalry is a Major League Baseball (MLB) division rivalry between the Los Angeles Dodgers and the San Diego Padres. The Dodgers and Padres are both members of the National League (NL) West Division. It is occasionally called the I-5 rivalry because Los Angeles and San Diego lie approximately 120 miles apart along Interstate 5.

== Background ==
The rise of Southern California as a major region of the United States brought about a significant economic rivalry between neighboring Los Angeles and San Diego. Through the years, San Diego proved to be an unstable home to its sports franchises as the NFL's Chargers and NBA's Clippers both relocated to Los Angeles. The San Diego Padres and Los Angeles Dodgers have been rivals ever since the Padres joined the National League West Division. The Dodgers have traditionally been the much more successful team in this rivalry, though most of the animosity in the rivalry is directed against LA by fans of San Diego. This is showcased by Padres fans and the organization embracing the "Beat LA" chant. Dodgers fans have often said that they do not view the Padres as a true rival, reserving that honor for the San Francisco Giants. However, this view of the rivalry has likely changed following the Padres' aggressive roster moves since 2020.

In the 2020s, both the Dodgers and Padres had bolstered their rosters in their quests for a playoff run, especially the Padres, who had not been serious contenders for a decade. The Dodgers swept the Padres in the NLDS, while the Padres returned the favor by knocking the Dodgers out of the 2022 NLDS. 2024 saw the teams match-up in their third postseason meeting, with the Dodgers coming back from a 2–1 series deficit in the NLDS to defeat the Padres in five games. The Dodgers won World Series both after eliminating the Padres in 2020 and 2024.

As of the 2025 season, the Dodgers currently lead the rivalry 532–431–1 in the regular season and 7–5 in postseason play. Additionally, the Dodgers have won 5 World Series Championships since the Padres came into existence in 1969. The Padres are still yet to win a title, coming closest in 1984 and 1998 (losing 4 games to 1 against the Detroit Tigers in 1984 and being swept by the New York Yankees in 1998). Since 1969, the Dodgers also lead in National League Pennants (10 vs. 2 in that time) and Divisional titles (23 vs. 5).

== History ==
=== 1960s ===
The first meeting between the two teams occurred during the seventh game of the 1969 season at Dodger Stadium on April 15, 1969. In the beginning, it seemed like it could be a pitchers’ duel. With Johnny Podres on the mound for the Padres, facing his old team in his final season in the majors, and Claude Osteen for the Dodgers, the first four innings passed quickly and uneventfully. But things fell apart for the Padres in the bottom of the fifth inning: A groundout gave way to a walk, three consecutive singles, and yet another walk, before Andy Kosco hit a grand slam that put the Dodgers ahead 6–0. Afterwards, Osteen limited the Padres to only three hits, the Dodger lineup piled eight more runs with the final score being 14–0. It was the Padres’ fourth consecutive loss after beginning their existence with a sweep of the Houston Astros before getting swept by the San Francisco Giants. The next day, they piled another nine runs on the Padres, who only mustered a lone run in response. The Padres finished their inaugural season with a 52–110 record and did not have a winning season for nearly a decade.

=== 1970s ===
The Padres' fortunes began to shift near the end of the 1970s as they had their first winning season in 1978, though they failed to qualify for the postseason as the Dodgers won the division en route to a World Series appearance. Despite the lone winning season in 1978, the Padres' only successes were two seasons at .500 in 1982 and 1983, while the Dodgers had three World Series appearances during the 1970s, in 1974, 1977, and 1978 (losing in all three).

=== 1980s ===
The Padres broke through with an appearance in their first World Series in 1984, but they fell to the Detroit Tigers in five games. The Dodgers, meanwhile, won a pair of championships in 1981 and 1988. In 1988, Orel Hershiser broke Don Drysdale's 58 2/3 scoreless inning streak against the Padres at Jack Murphy Stadium. For the Padres, the 1980s saw the debut of the best player in franchise history, Tony Gwynn.

=== 1990s ===
The Dodgers teams soon waned in competition through the 1990s, only winning the division in 1994 (unofficially, because the end of the regular season and the World Series were canceled) and 1995. In 1995, the Dodgers appeared in the NLDS but were swept by the Reds. Meanwhile, the fortunes had alternated in favor of the Padres during the 1996 season. After trailing the Dodgers by two games heading into the final series of the season against them, the Padres recorded a three-game sweep at Dodger Stadium to win the division crown, winning the first and last game in extra-innings. It would be Chris Gwynn, the brother of Tony and a former Dodger player, who delivered the game-winning runs that won the Padres their first NL West crown since 1984 in the final game of the series. The high for San Diego was short-lived, as they were quickly dispatched by the Cardinals in the NLDS. The Dodgers still made the postseason as a wild card team, but were also swept by the Braves in the NLDS. It was the closest the two teams had come to a potential playoff series, a series that wouldn't come until 2020. In addition, the 1996 National League West race was one of the few times the rivals finished 1–2 finish in the NL West standings; this feat wouldn't happen again until the 2006 season.

In 1998, the Padres had their most wins in franchise history with 98, won the NL West again, and won the National League pennant for the first time since 1984, but had the misfortunate of facing the 114-win New York Yankees in the World Series. As a result, they were swept in four games. To date, 1998 represents San Diego's last World Series appearance.

=== 2000s ===
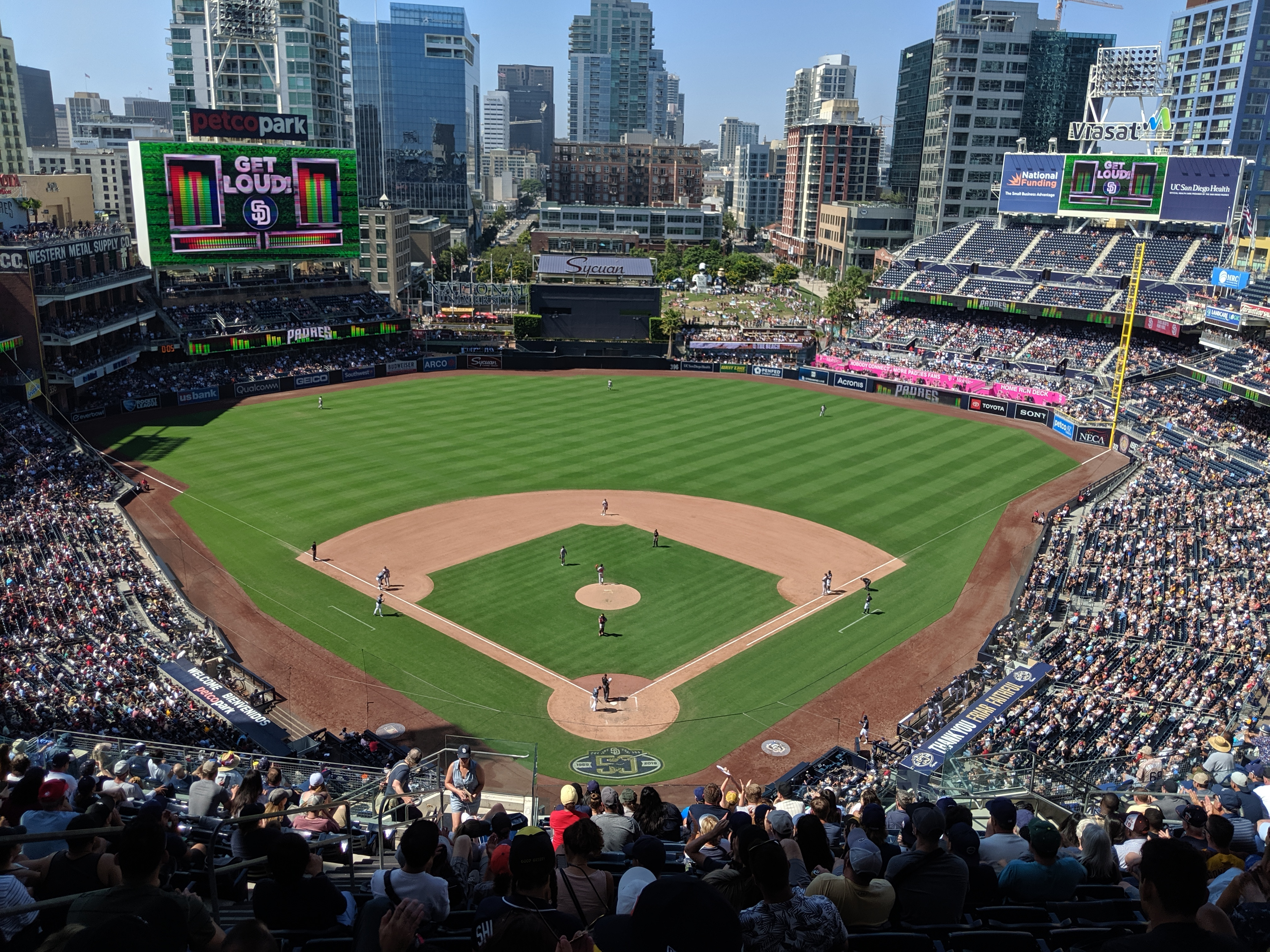
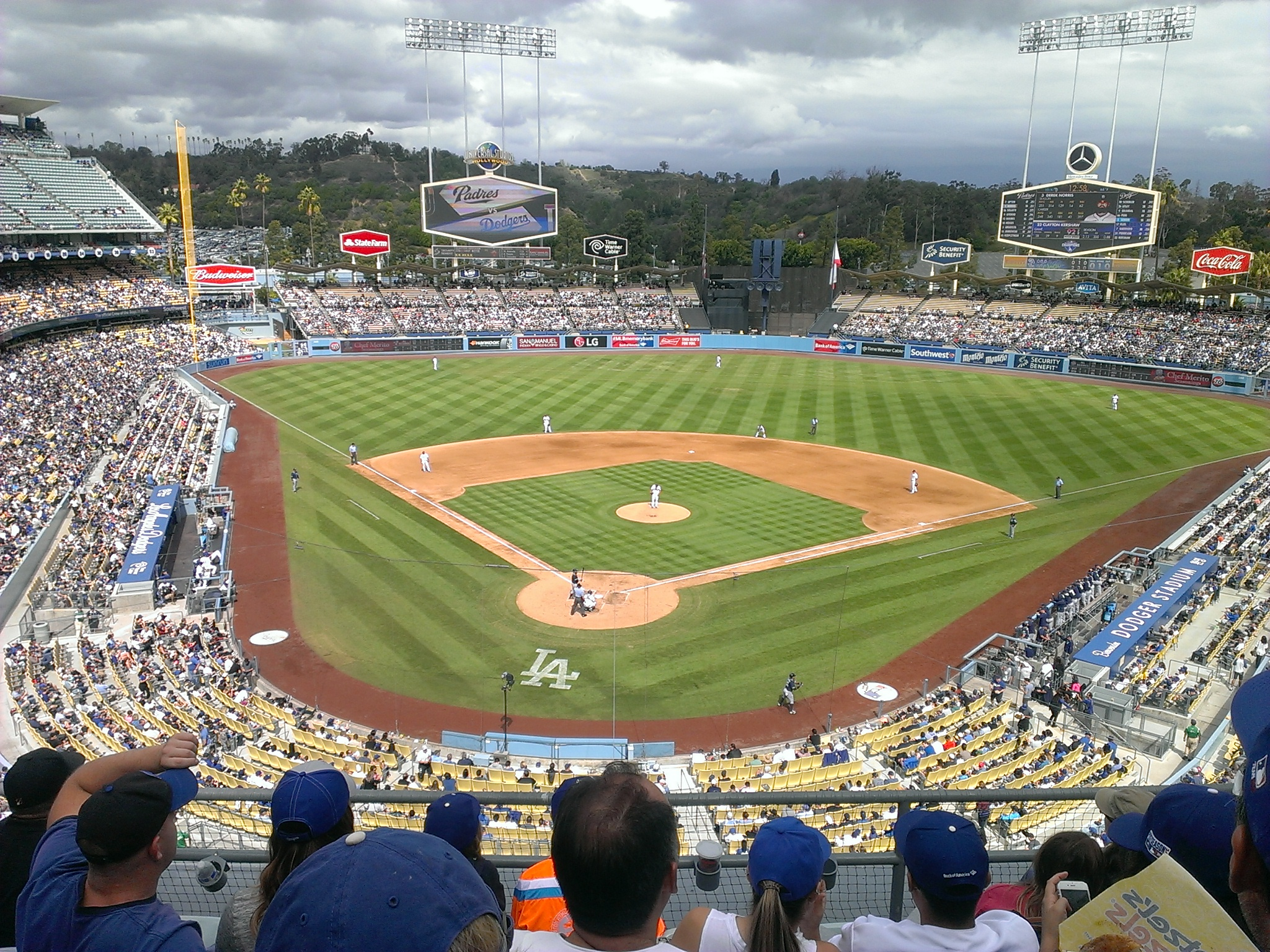
Petco Park (left), home of the Padres, and Dodger Stadium (right), home of the Dodgers.

Both franchises enjoyed success and encountered problems in the 2000s.

In particular, the 2006 NL West race was the closest race ever between the two rivals, playing in perhaps their most memorable series of the rival thus far in September 2006. Coming into the a four-game series in the middle of September, Los Angeles held a half game lead in the N.L. West over San Diego with two and a half weeks left in the season. Los Angeles won the first game of the series 3–1 after a strong pitching performance by Maddux, extending the Dodgers' lead to a 1½ games over San Diego. The second game of the series was an 11–2 rout in favor of San Diego, trimming the Dodgers lead back to a half game. The third game of the series was a pitchers' duel between San Diego's Chris Young and the Dodgers Derek Lowe. San Diego scored first after Russell Branyan hit a solo home run to make it 1–0. Russell Martin tied the game at 1–1 with a solo home run of his own in the 7th. But San Diego won the game 2–1 when Khalil Greene scored on Terrmel Sledge's single. San Diego's victory gave them a half game lead over the Dodgers in the N.L. West.

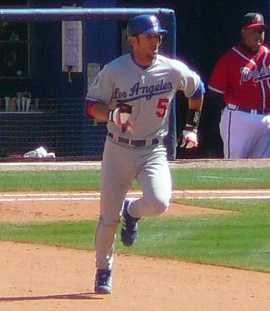
Nomar Garciaparra walk-off home run against the Padres would temporarily give the Dodgers the NL West lead on September 18, 2006, in what Dodgers' fans call the 4+1 game.

==== 4+1 Game ====
The last game of the series on September 18 was a rocky start for the Dodgers. Brad Penny gave up four runs in the first inning, giving San Diego a 4-0 lead. Los Angeles slowly climbed back into the game, and tied the score 4-4 in the third inning. Neither team scored again until San Diego scored two in the top of the 8th to take a 6-4 lead. The Dodgers would cut San Diego's lead to one run after Wilson Betemit drove in Marlon Anderson with an RBI single. San Diego scored three runs in the top of the 9th and appeared to have broken the game wide open with a 9-5 lead. With a four-run lead, San Diego elected to bring in Jon Adkins to pitch the 9th instead of closer Trevor Hoffman, who at the time was just three saves shy of tying the all-time record. Jeff Kent and J. D. Drew hit back-to-back home runs off of Adkins to close the lead to 9–7 with nobody out. San Diego then elected to bring Hoffman in to finish the game. Hoffman however, gave up back-to-back home runs to Martin and Anderson on the first two pitches Hoffman threw, tying the score at 9–9. It was only the fourth time a team hit four consecutive home runs in an inning, and the first time since the Minnesota Twins did so in 1964. San Diego scored a run in the top of the 10th on Josh Bard's RBI single to take a 10–9 lead. However, after Kenny Lofton walked, Nomar Garciaparra hit the game-winning two-run walk off home run. The Dodgers' 11–10 victory gave them a half game lead over San Diego with just two weeks left in the season.

Despite being one of the Dodgers' most dramatic and memorable moments in recent history, the come-from-behind victory was rendered mostly moot as San Diego would make up the half game deficit, finishing with the NL West crown due to their 13–5 record against the Los Angeles Dodgers throughout the season. Subsequently, the Dodgers secured the wild card spot as the NL's best non-division winning team in 2006; nonetheless, both teams were swept in the NLDS, preventing their first playoff match-up.

External videos
- https://www.youtube.com/watch?v=fOiIoFi2Yn4 - Petco Park opening day on April 4, 2004 via CBS San Diego

The Dodgers won the division three times in the decade (2004, 2008, 2009), to go along with the wildcard spot in 2006. However, the Frank McCourt–led ownership proved to be largely flawed as the Dodgers often boasted immensely talented rosters filled with young talent, but constantly fell short of a World Series appearance. The Padres had back-to-back division wins in 2005 and aforementioned 2006, but fell to the St. Louis Cardinals both times in the NLDS. Notably, the rivals were the only two teams to play spring training in China as a part of the MLB China Series in 2008. Additionally, the Padres moved into Petco Park, their own stadium for the first time, in 2004.

=== 2010s ===
2010 saw the Padres lead the NL West for much of the season before losing their lead in mid-September to the eventual World champion San Francisco Giants. San Diego rallied back to tie the San Francisco in the last series of the regular season; however, they lost the last game, thus giving the Giants the NL West crown. They did not seriously compete again in the NL West or for a postseason spot for the rest of the decade.

In 2012, both franchises saw changes in ownership. Before the start of the 2012 season, the Guggenheim Partners bought the Dodgers for $2.15 billion, the most expensive sale for an MLB franchise at the time. Later that year, Peter O'Malley and Ron Fowler formed the O'Malley Group, which purchased MLB's San Diego Padres from John Moores for $800 million. This was of significance to the Dodgers–Padres rivalry due to O'Malley family involvement, who owned the Dodgers from 1944–1998.

In 2016, both teams met for the league season opener. Both teams began the season with new managers, including Dave Roberts, the former Padres manager who had signed with the Dodgers during the offseason. The Dodgers won 15–0. The Dodgers made two World Series appearances, in 2017 and 2018, but controversially fell in to the Houston Astros and the Boston Red Sox, respectively, with the 2017 Series in particular later being marred in a sign-stealing scandal. The Dodgers won the NL West division for a seven-year stretch from 2013 to 2020 while the Padres failed to make the postseason since 2006.

=== 2020s ===
The 2020 season was limited to 60 games by the COVID-19 pandemic. The Padres returned to the original brown, gold, and white uniform colors after using navy blue as the predominant color since 1991, solidifying the contrast of the Dodgers’ blue, white, and red uniform colors. The Dodgers won the division title while the Padres finished in second. The two teams met in the Division Series, played in Arlington, Texas, under COVID-19 contingencies.

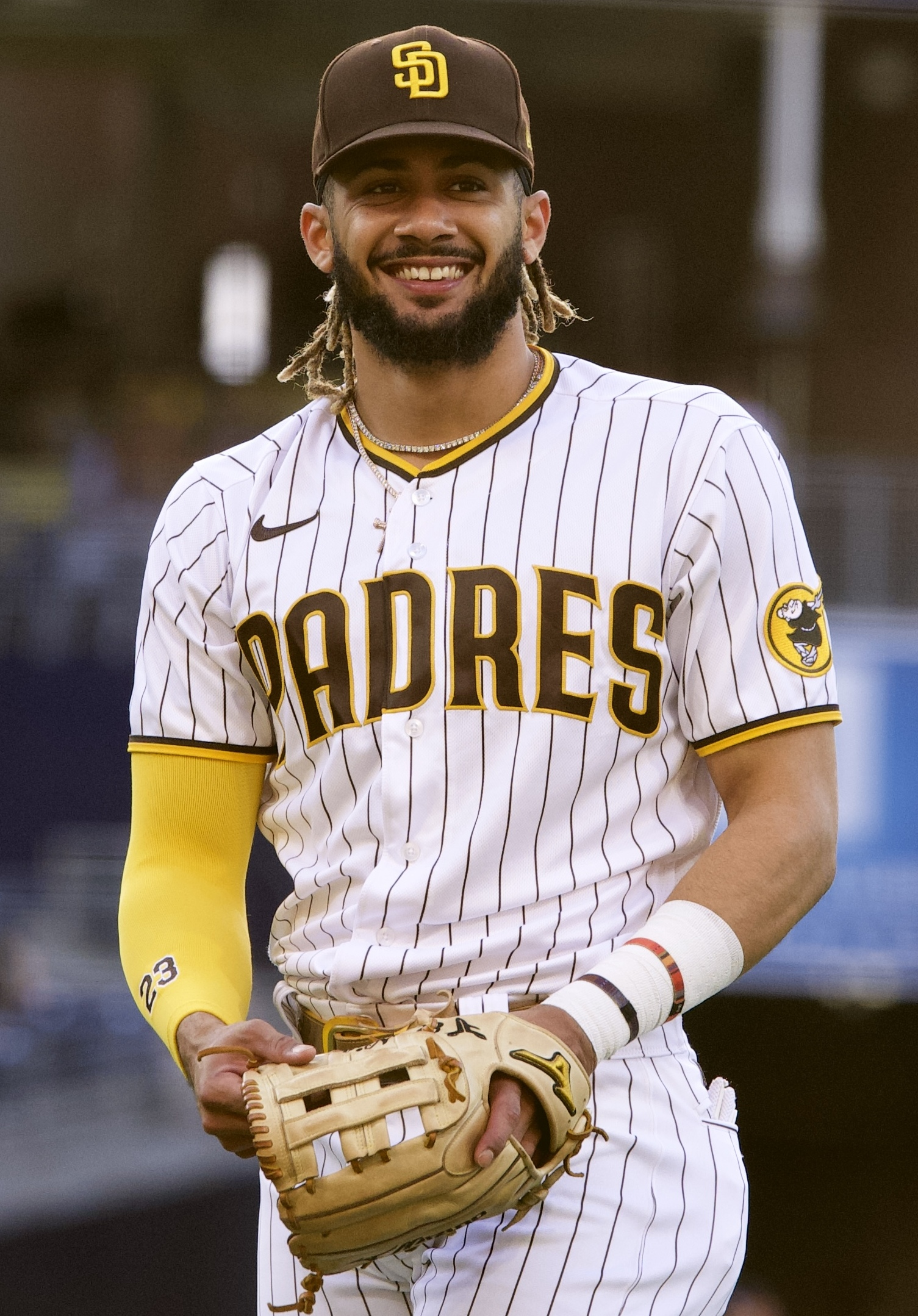
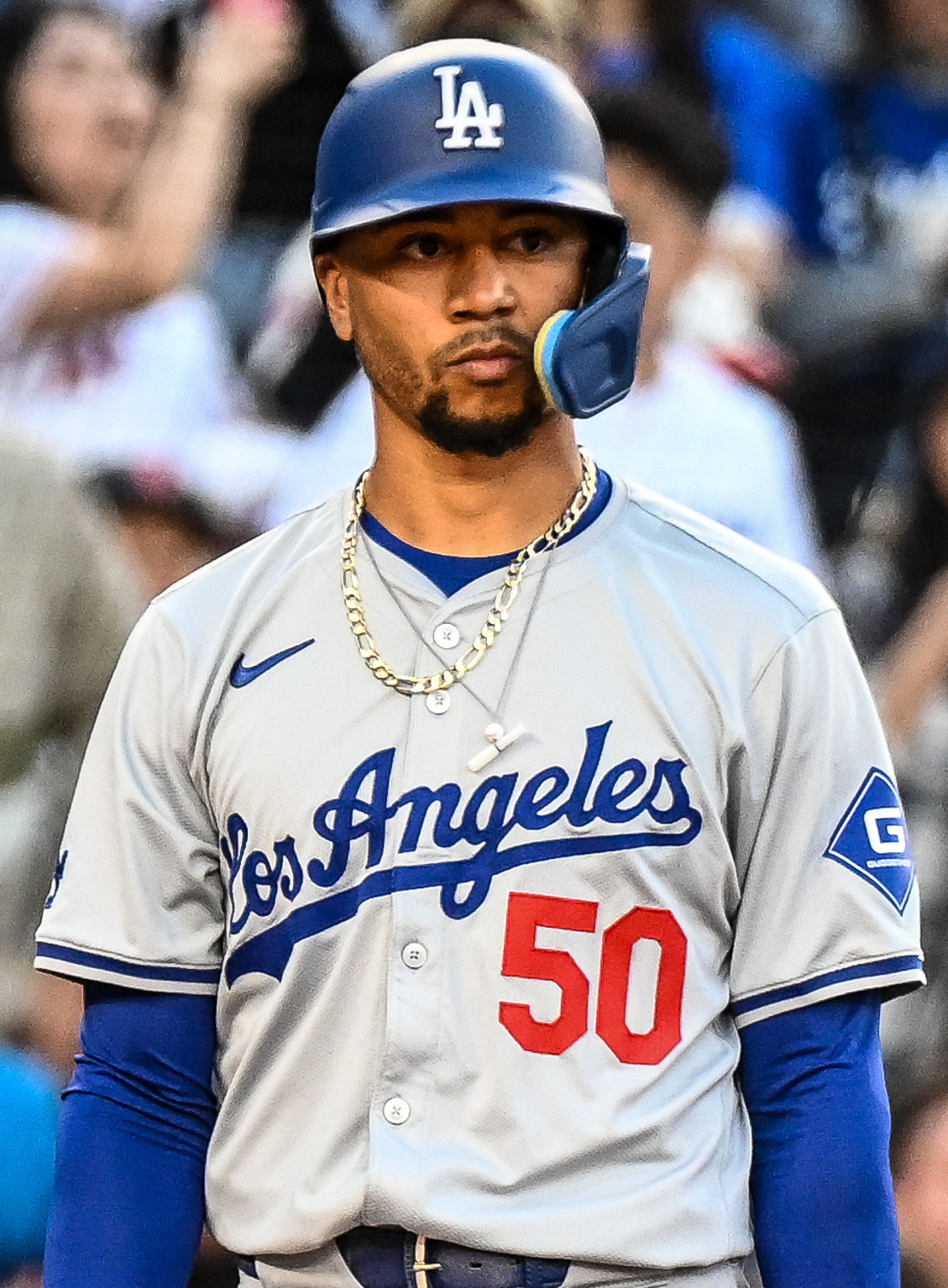
The Padres' Fernando Tatis Jr. and the Dodgers' Mookie Betts both came within reach of winning National League MVP in 2020.

==== 2020 NLDS ====
In Game 1, an injured Mike Clevinger returned to the mound for the Padres but was pulled after one inning after a noticeable drop in velocity. The game remained scoreless until the fourth inning, when the Padres scored on a two-out hit from Austin Nola. San Diego enjoyed their lead briefly – until the Dodgers scored on an error in the fifth. Then a game that had been well-pitched to that point boiled over in the sixth, when the Dodgers put up four runs to win, 5–1 score. Just like Game 3 of their wild card win over the Cardinals, the Padres used nine pitchers and walked ten batters, along the way. The Padres took an early lead in the second inning when Wil Myers hit a double to center field that scored Tommy Pham. The Dodgers took the lead for good in the third inning on a two-run double by Corey Seager and a single by Max Muncy, and padded their lead the next inning on a Cody Bellinger home run. The Padres began the sixth inning with back-to-back home runs by Manny Machado and Eric Hosmer that reduced their deficit to one, but Dodgers starter Clayton Kershaw retired the next three batters to end the inning. The Padres threatened again in the seventh inning, when Bellinger made a spectacular catch over the center-field wall that would otherwise have been a go-ahead two-run home run by Fernando Tatís Jr. The Dodgers padded their lead in the bottom of the seventh on a Justin Turner sacrifice fly and a single by Muncy. The Padres threatened in the top of the ninth inning, scoring two runs and once again reducing their deficit to one and load the bases, however. Joe Kelly got Hosmer to ground out to end the game. In Game 3, the Dodgers took an early lead in the second inning that was quickly erased when the Padres scored two runs in the bottom half of the inning. The Padres' lead was also short-lived, as the Dodgers scored five runs in the third inning en route to a blowout win. Though he did not start the game, Dodgers starter Julio Urías pitched five innings in relief, allowing one run on one hit, striking out six Padres, and getting credited as the winning pitcher. The Padres, meanwhile, used 11 pitchers – a postseason record for a nine-inning game. The Dodgers advanced to their fourth NLCS in five seasons, ultimately winning the World Series.

==== 2021 and 2022 regular season ====
After trading for Yu Darvish, Joe Musgrove and Blake Snell in the off-season, the Padres looked like their fortunes would continue to reverse during the 2021 season, but the San Francisco Giants made an unexpected push to win the division with the Dodgers finishing in second. The Padres only posted a 79-83 record, missing the postseason. After the season, Padres manager Jayce Tingler was fired and was replaced by long-time Oakland A's manager Bob Melvin. At the 2022 trade deadline, the Padres acquired Juan Soto, Josh Bell, Brandon Drury, and Josh Hader, going all-in to beat the Dodgers and win their first World Series. Padres owner Peter Seidler, the nephew of Peter O'Malley, described the situation as such. "They're the dragon up the freeway that we're trying to slay," Seidler said during an in-game interview on ESPN's Sunday Night Baseball when describing the Dodgers-Padres dynamic. The Dodgers finished 2022 going 14–5 against San Diego, not dropping a single series against the Padres. Things grew worse for San Diego as Fernando Tatis Jr. (who was gearing up for make his debut on the season from an off-season injury to his shoulder) was suspended for 80 games on August 12 after testing positive for Clostebal; a banned steroid. The Dodgers led the league with 111 wins, their most in franchise history. As such, they won the division after losing the close race to the Giants in 2021.

==== 2022 NLDS ====
The Padres rebounded towards the end of the season and earned a wild card spot, where they defeated the New York Mets 2–1 in the Wild Card Series. The Dodgers and Padres played each other in the 2022 National League Division Series. During Game 2, a goose landed on the field of Dodger Stadium, with both fanbases claiming it as a rally goose and a curse for their team. The Padres won the series 3–1 in an upset over the Dodgers, whose 111 wins in the regular season were the fourth most in MLB history and 22 more than San Diego's 89. The only time in league playoff history that a team defeated an opponent who was more than 22 wins better was in the 1906 World Series, when the 93-win Chicago White Sox defeated the 116-win Chicago Cubs. The win advanced San Diego to their first NLCS since 1998. However, their postseason run fell short of a World Series berth as they were upset as well, this time by the 6th seed Philadelphia Phillies, who defeated them in 5 games.

==== 2023 ====
During the 2023 season, tensions began to rise between the two teams yet again after a May 6 game in San Diego in which the Padres media team displayed a photoshopped meme of Clayton Kershaw crying in an effort to taunt the Dodgers. The image led to controversy by fans and sportswriters. Following the incident, the Padres lost 10 out of their next 12 games, including 5 consecutive losses to the Dodgers. This caused fans to believe that the scoreboard image cursed the team, jokingly labeling the incident "Curseshaw". The image came after the Padres took the season series opener, 5–2. Following the gesture, the Padres only won one series against the Dodgers the entire season. Despite a late season rally, San Diego had a disappointing season in 2023, with some calling it their most disappointing in franchise history. They won 82 games and missed the postseason, much like 2021. With San Diego's self-implosion, Los Angeles cruised to yet another NL West division title. However, the Dodgers were once again upset by a division rival in the postseason, as they were swept for the first time since 2006 by the Arizona Diamondbacks in the NLDS.

San Diego owner Peter Seidler died in November at the age 63 after a battle with cancer. Later that off-season, the Padres traded Juan Soto and Trent Grisham to the Yankees for Michael King and Kyle Higashioka, among other young players and prospects. This move would ultimately result in the acquisition of Dylan Cease from the Chicago White Sox. San Diego also replaced manager Bob Melvin, who mutually parted ways with the team, with Mike Shildt.

In the same off-season, the Dodgers signed superstar two-way player Shohei Ohtani and Nippon League pitching star Yoshinobu Yamamoto, among other significant roster moves.

==== 2024 ====
Both teams opened the 2024 season with a 2-game series at Gocheok Sky Dome in Seoul, South Korea on March 20 and 21, 2024, splitting the series.

The Padres would dedicate the 2024 season in memory of Seidler and they would have their highest win total in a season (93) since the pennant winning 1998 season. It would also be the first year the Padres would win the regular-season series against the Dodgers since 2010. The Juan Soto trade proved to improve the Padres as they received Michael King in the trade, a young dynamic pitcher that helped lengthen their rotation. The Padres would clinch a postseason spot on a triple play against the Dodgers, becoming the first time a team ever clinch a postseason berth on a triple play. The Dodgers would clinch first seed and the NL West two nights later, which meant there would be another Dodgers-Padres postseason if the Padres won their Wild Card Series match-up against Atlanta, which they did.

==== 2024 NLDS ====
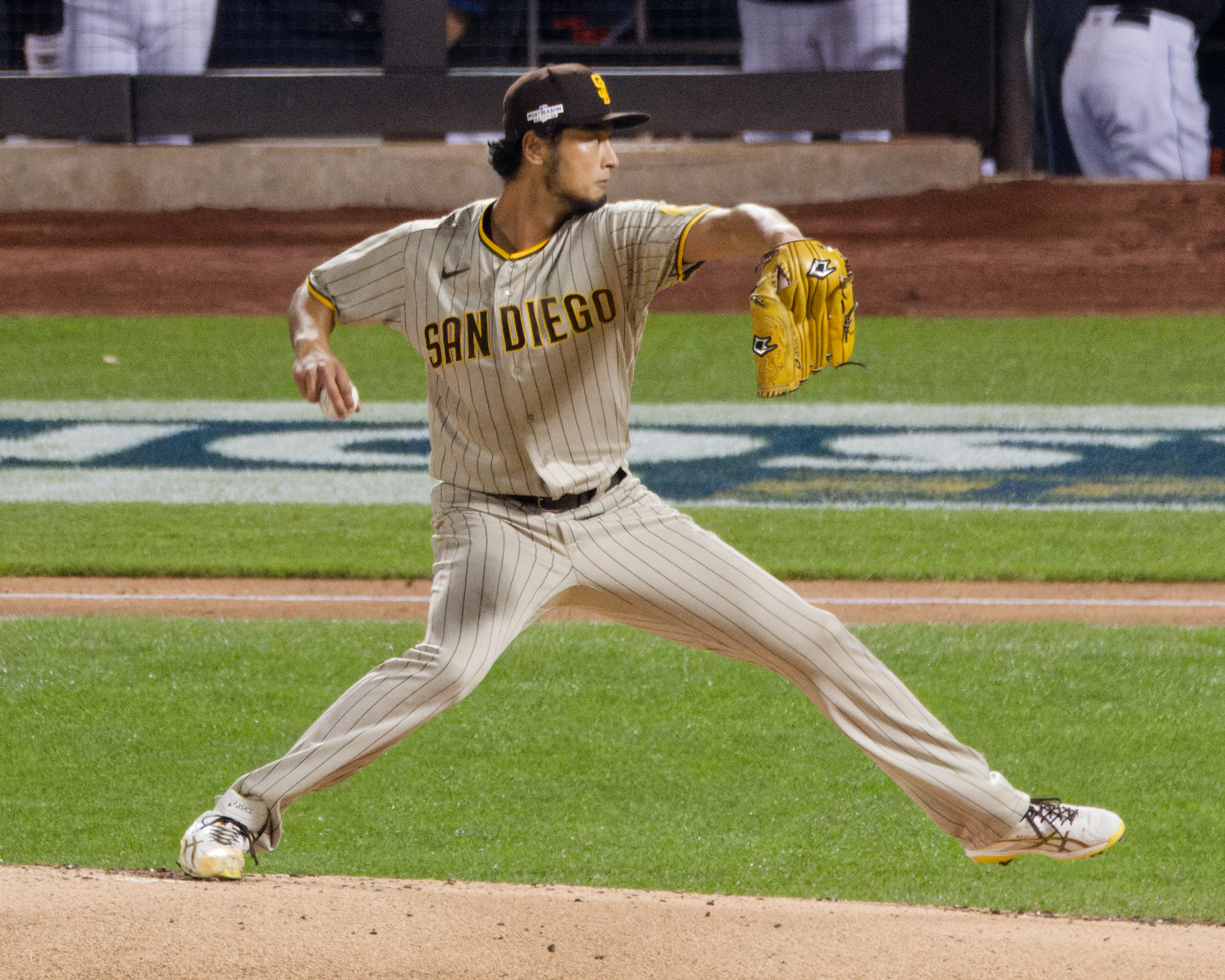
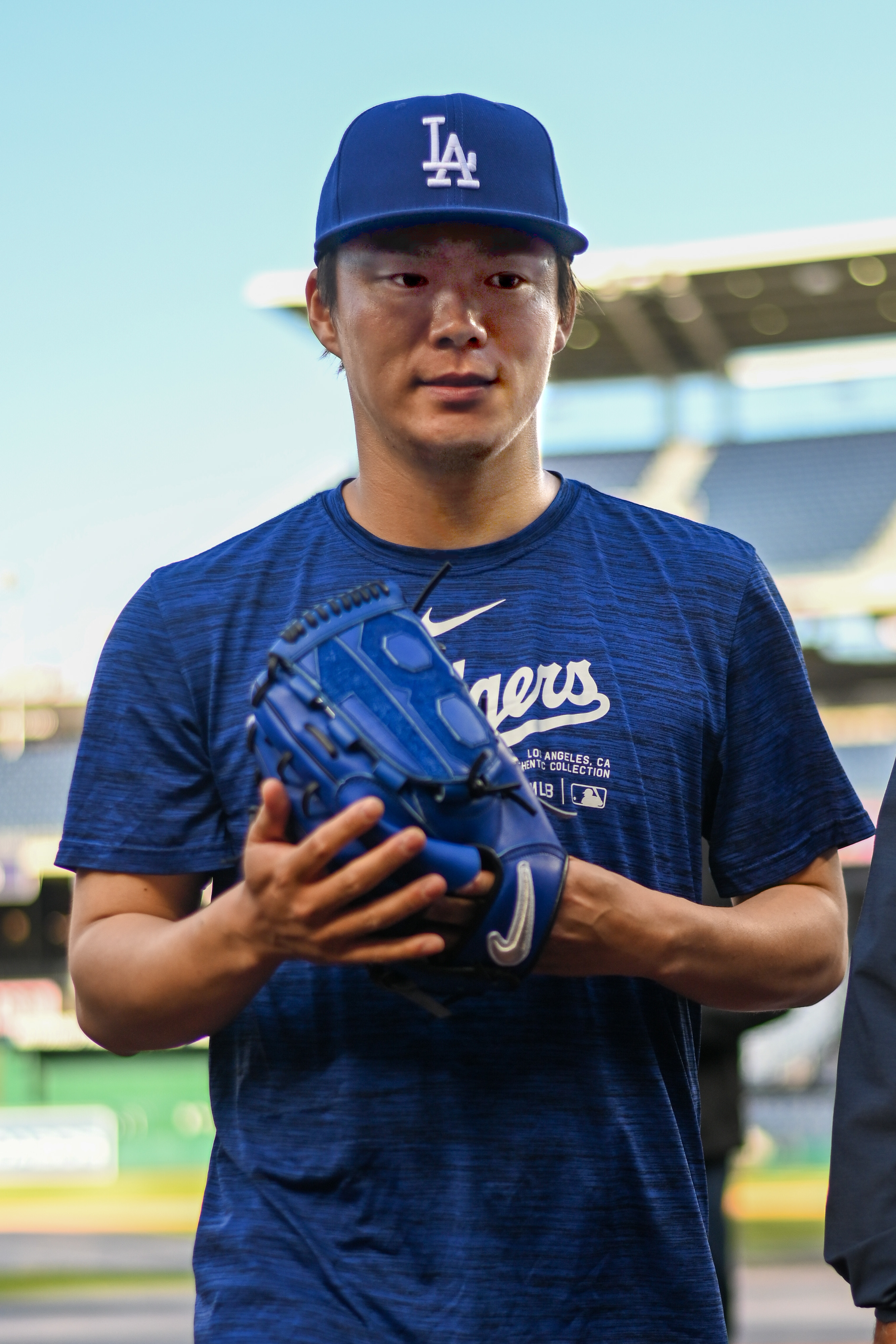
Darvish (left) and Yamamoto (right) were the first pair of Japanese-born pitchers to start a postseason game in the Game 5 of the 2024 NLDS.

The two teams met in the NLDS for the third time in five seasons. The Dodgers avenged their series loss to the Padres two seasons prior, winning a tense five-game series. The Dodger bullpen was key in the team’s series victory, as it helped hold the Padres scoreless for the last 24 innings of the series.

The teams split the first two games in Los Angeles, with Shohei Ohtani and the Dodgers erasing two separate multi-run deficits to win Game 1, 7–5, and the Padres pulling away from the Dodgers late in a 10–2 Game 2 rout. At Petco Park in San Diego, the Padres used a six-run second inning, capped by a Fernando Tatis Jr. home run to take a 6–1 lead in Game 3, but then allowed a Teoscar Hernandez grand slam in the top of the third inning to reduce the lead to 6–5. However, the game saw no further scoring by either team, and San Diego took a two games to one lead, becoming the betting favorites to win the World Series in the process. The Padres now held a prime opportunity to win a second consecutive playoff series over an originally favored Dodgers team at home, and elected to send ace starting pitcher Dylan Cease to the mound on short rest in a potential clinching Game 4, while injuries to Dodgers' starting pitchers forced them to play a rare postseason bullpen game using entirely relief pitchers. Instead, the Dodgers' bullpen shut out the Padres 8–0 to force a decisive Game 5 at Dodger Stadium. In the first matchup between two Japanese-born starting pitchers (Yu Darvish and Yoshinobu Yamamoto) in the history of the Major League Baseball postseason, the Dodgers used two solo home runs to once again shut out San Diego, 2–0, and advance to the NLCS.

External videos
- https://www.youtube.com/watch?v=9LJKpJ6sxkU - Dodgers vs. Padres: MINI-MOVIE of 2024 NLDS via MLB on FOX

The 2024 series was more heated than their previous two postseason match-ups, as there were multiple incidents and controversies, specifically in Game 2. In Game 2 at Dodger Stadium, Jurickson Profar robbed Mookie Betts of a first inning home run. After the catch, Profar playfully engaged with fans in the left field stands. When attempting to provide a Dodgers fan a souvenir ball later in the game, the ball was thrown back onto the field. Although harmless, it led to multiple objects including baseballs, bottles, and other trash being directed at Profar, Fernando Tatis Jr. in right field, and the Padres bullpen. The game was delayed as members of the Dodgers grounds crew cleaned up the items thrown onto the field by Dodgers fans. After the game, video surfaced of Manny Machado throwing a baseball towards the Dodgers' dugout after the end of an inning, leading to a strong reaction from Dodgers' manager Dave Roberts. Roberts admitted to using the incident as a diversionary tactic to motivate his players following their Game 2 blowout defeat.

The Dodgers would go on to win their eighth World Series a few weeks later, defeating the New York Yankees in five games, winning their second of the 2020s, and their first World Series title in a full MLB season since 1988. After the Dodgers won both of their elimination games in the NLDS against the Padres, they did not face another elimination game for the rest of the postseason. In the aftermath of their championship, Roberts and several Dodgers players stated that the true World Series was the series against the Padres, calling them by far their toughest challenger and most hostile road atmosphere.

==== 2025 Incidents ====
During the 2024–25 offseason, both teams engaged in a competitive battle to sign 23-year-old pitcher Roki Sasaki. The Padres' efforts to outbid the Dodgers for Sasaki proved futile as he ultimately signed with Los Angeles on January 17, 2025.

Hostility between the two teams prevailed during a game on June 17, 2025 in Los Angeles, as Dodgers' star center fielder Andy Pages was struck by a 98 mph fastball in the elbow by Padres' pitcher Dylan Cease. Pages took exception to the hit by pitch, resulting in both benches clearing and arguing with one another before umpires signaled both to return to their dugouts. Tensions between the two teams ultimately reached a boiling point 2 days later, on June 19, 2025. In the top of the ninth inning, Fernando Tatis Jr. was hit on his right hand by Dodgers' reliever Jack Little. Padres manager Mike Shildt expressed his frustrations with Dodgers manager Dave Roberts, resulting in a brief but heated argument and yet another bases-clearing incident. Both managers were ultimately ejected for the incident, but the incidents continued. In the 9th inning on a 3-0 count, Shohei Ohtani was struck in the midsection by a 100 mph fastball from Padres' pitcher Robert Suárez. Umpires immediately ejected both Suárez and Assistant Manager Brian Esposito (who had entered as manager following the ejection of Shildt) for the pitch, considering the suspect nature of the hit by pitch. (Suarez had not hit a single batter in the previous two seasons). Of note was Ohtani's reaction to the incident, signaling to his teammates to not exit the dugout and avoiding another bases-clearing incident. Ohtani was later seen joking with Suarez about the incident at the 2025 Home Run Derby. Both Roberts and Shildt received a 1-game suspension for the altercation. Additionally, Suarez was suspended 3 games for the incident, which was later reduced to 2 games upon appeal.

The Dodgers and Padres continued to battle in the regular season over an NL West title, with Dodgers finishing three games in front of the Padres. The two teams did not meet in the 2025 postseason, as the Padres were eliminated in the first round of the playoffs by the Chicago Cubs. The Dodgers went on to win the World Series, successfully defending their title for the first time in 25 years since the 1998–2000 New York Yankees. After the season, Shildt retired and the team hired longtime former relief pitcher Craig Stammen as manager.

== Season-by-season results ==
Dodgers vs. Padres Season-by-Season Results
1960s (Dodgers, 12–6)

| Season | Season series | | at Los Angeles Dodgers | at San Diego Padres | Overall series | Notes |
|---|---|---|---|---|---|---|
| 1969 | Dodgers | 12‍–‍6 | Dodgers, 8‍–‍1 | Padres, 5‍–‍4 | Dodgers; 12‍–‍6 | From the end of the very first game on April 15, the Dodgers have not relinquished a series lead to this day. |

1970s (Dodgers, 109–71)

| Season | Season series | | at Los Angeles Dodgers | at San Diego Padres | Overall series | Notes |
|---|---|---|---|---|---|---|
| 1970 | Dodgers | 11‍–‍7 | Dodgers, 6‍–‍3 | Dodgers, 5‍–‍4 | Dodgers; 23‍–‍13 | |
| 1971 | Dodgers | 13‍–‍5 | Padres, 5‍–‍4 | Dodgers, 9‍–‍0 | Dodgers; 36‍–‍18 | |
| 1972 | Dodgers | 13‍–‍5 | Dodgers, 6‍–‍3 | Dodgers, 7‍–‍2 | Dodgers; 49‍–‍23 | |
| 1973 | Tie | 9‍–‍9 | Padres, 7‍–‍2 | Dodgers, 7‍–‍2 | Dodgers; 58‍–‍32 | |
| 1974 | Dodgers | 16‍–‍2 | Dodgers, 8‍–‍1 | Dodgers, 8‍–‍1 | Dodgers; 74‍–‍34 | Dodgers lose 1974 World Series |
| 1975 | Dodgers | 11‍–‍7 | Dodgers, 6‍–‍3 | Dodgers, 5‍–‍4 | Dodgers; 85‍–‍41 | |
| 1976 | Padres | 12‍–‍6 | Padres, 6‍–‍3 | Padres, 6‍–‍3 | Dodgers; 91‍–‍53 | |
| 1977 | Dodgers | 12‍–‍6 | Dodgers, 5‍–‍4 | Dodgers, 7‍–‍2 | Dodgers; 103‍–‍59 | Dodgers lose 1977 World Series |
| 1978 | Tie | 9‍–‍9 | Dodgers, 7‍–‍2 | Padres, 7‍–‍2 | Dodgers; 112‍–‍68 | Dodgers lose 1978 World Series |
| 1979 | Tie | 9‍–‍9 | Dodgers, 6‍–‍3 | Padres, 6‍–‍3 | Dodgers; 121‍–‍77 | |

1980s (Padres, 95–78–1)

| Season | Season series | | at Los Angeles Dodgers | at San Diego Padres | Overall series | Notes |
|---|---|---|---|---|---|---|
| 1980 | Tie | 9‍–‍9 | Dodgers, 7‍–‍2 | Padres, 7‍–‍2 | Dodgers; 130‍–‍86 | |
| 1981 | Dodgers | 6‍–‍5 | Tie, 3‍–‍3 | Dodgers, 3‍–‍2 | Dodgers; 136‍–‍91 | Strike-shortened season Padres' San Diego Stadium renamed Jack Murphy Stadium; Dodgers win 1981 World Series |
| 1982 | Tie | 9‍–‍9 | Dodgers, 6‍–‍3 | Padres, 6‍–‍3 | Dodgers; 145‍–‍100 | |
| 1983 | Padres | 12‍–‍6‍–‍1 | Padres, 7‍–‍2 | Padres, 5‍–‍4‍–‍1 | Dodgers; 151‍–‍112‍–‍1 | |
| 1984 | Dodgers | 10‍–‍8 | Dodgers, 5‍–‍4 | Dodgers, 5‍–‍4 | Dodgers; 161‍–‍120‍–‍1 | Padres lose 1984 World Series |
| 1985 | Padres | 10‍–‍8 | Padres, 5‍–‍4 | Padres, 5‍–‍4 | Dodgers; 169‍–‍130‍–‍1 | |
| 1986 | Padres | 12‍–‍6 | Padres, 6‍–‍3 | Padres, 6‍–‍3 | Dodgers; 175‍–‍142‍–‍1 | |
| 1987 | Dodgers | 11‍–‍7 | Dodgers, 6‍–‍3 | Dodgers, 5‍–‍4 | Dodgers; 186‍–‍149‍–‍1 | |
| 1988 | Padres | 11‍–‍7 | Dodgers, 5‍–‍4 | Padres, 7‍–‍2 | Dodgers; 193‍–‍160‍–‍1 | Dodgers win 1988 World Series |
| 1989 | Padres | 12‍–‍6 | Padres, 6‍–‍3 | Padres, 6‍–‍3 | Dodgers; 199‍–‍172‍–‍1 | |

1990s (Padres, 71–68)

| Season | Season series | | at Los Angeles Dodgers | at San Diego Padres | Overall series | Notes |
|---|---|---|---|---|---|---|
| 1990 | Tie | 9‍–‍9 | Dodgers, 6‍–‍3 | Padres, 6‍–‍3 | Dodgers; 208‍–‍181‍–‍1 | |
| 1991 | Dodgers | 10‍–‍8 | Dodgers, 5‍–‍4 | Dodgers, 5‍–‍4 | Dodgers; 218‍–‍189‍–‍1 | |
| 1992 | Tie | 9‍–‍9 | Dodgers, 5‍–‍4 | Padres, 5‍–‍4 | Dodgers; 227‍–‍198‍–‍1 | |
| 1993 | Dodgers | 9‍–‍4 | Dodgers, 5‍–‍1 | Dodgers, 4‍–‍3 | Dodgers; 236‍–‍202‍–‍1 | |
| 1994 | Dodgers | 6‍–‍4 | Dodgers, 5‍–‍2 | Padres, 2‍–‍1 | Dodgers; 242‍–‍206‍–‍1 | Strike-shortened season. Strike cancels postseason. MLB adds Wild Card, allowing for both teams to make the postseason in the same year. |
| 1995 | Dodgers | 7‍–‍6 | Dodgers, 4‍–‍3 | Tie, 3‍–‍3 | Dodgers; 249‍–‍212‍–‍1 | 1994 realignment increases meetings from 12 to 13 meetings per year. |
| 1996 | Padres | 8‍–‍5 | Padres, 5‍–‍1 | Dodgers, 4‍–‍3 | Dodgers; 254‍–‍220‍–‍1 | Padres record three-game sweep of final series of season against Dodgers at Dodger Stadium after trailing them by two games to win the division crown. |
| 1997 | Padres | 7‍–‍5 | Padres, 4‍–‍2 | Tie, 3‍–‍3 | Dodgers; 259‍–‍227‍–‍1 | Padres' Jack Murphy Stadium renamed Qualcomm Stadium |
| 1998 | Padres | 7‍–‍5 | Tie, 3‍–‍3 | Padres, 4‍–‍2 | Dodgers; 264‍–‍234‍–‍1 | MLB changed to an unbalanced schedule in 1998 to accommodate MLB's expansion and realignment, resulting in 12–13 meetings per year. Padres lose 1998 World Series |
| 1999 | Padres | 9‍–‍3 | Padres, 4‍–‍2 | Padres, 5‍–‍1 | Dodgers; 267‍–‍243‍–‍1 | |

2000s (Dodgers, 90–89)

| Season | Season series | | at Los Angeles Dodgers | at San Diego Padres | Overall series | Notes |
|---|---|---|---|---|---|---|
| 2000 | Dodgers | 8‍–‍5 | Dodgers, 4‍–‍3 | Dodgers, 4‍–‍2 | Dodgers; 275‍–‍248‍–‍1 | |
| 2001 | Padres | 10‍–‍9 | Padres, 7‍–‍2 | Dodgers, 7‍–‍3 | Dodgers; 284‍–‍258‍–‍1 | MLB changed to an unbalanced schedule in 2001, resulting in 18–19 meetings per year |
| 2002 | Dodgers | 10‍–‍9 | Dodgers, 6‍–‍4 | Padres, 5‍–‍4 | Dodgers; 294‍–‍267‍–‍1 | |
| 2003 | Padres | 11‍–‍8 | Dodgers, 5‍–‍4 | Padres, 7‍–‍3 | Dodgers; 302‍–‍278‍–‍1 | |
| 2004 | Dodgers | 10‍–‍9 | Tie, 5‍–‍5 | Dodgers, 5‍–‍4 | Dodgers; 312‍–‍287‍–‍1 | Padres open Petco Park |
| 2005 | Dodgers | 11‍–‍7 | Dodgers, 7‍–‍2 | Padres, 5‍–‍4 | Dodgers; 323‍–‍294‍–‍1 | |
| 2006 | Padres | 13‍–‍5 | Padres, 7‍–‍2 | Padres, 6‍–‍3 | Dodgers; 328‍–‍307‍–‍1 | |
| 2007 | Padres | 10‍–‍8 | Dodgers, 5‍–‍4 | Padres, 6‍–‍3 | Dodgers; 336‍–‍317‍–‍1 | |
| 2008 | Dodgers | 11‍–‍7 | Dodgers, 6‍–‍3 | Dodgers, 5‍–‍4 | Dodgers; 347‍–‍324‍–‍1 | |
| 2009 | Dodgers | 10‍–‍8 | Dodgers, 6‍–‍3 | Padres, 5‍–‍4 | Dodgers; 357‍–‍332‍–‍1 | |

2010s (Dodgers, 120–67)

| Season | Season series | | at Los Angeles Dodgers | at San Diego Padres | Overall series | Notes |
|---|---|---|---|---|---|---|
| 2010 | Padres | 10‍–‍8 | Padres, 5‍–‍4 | Padres, 5‍–‍4 | Dodgers; 365‍–‍342‍–‍1 | |
| 2011 | Dodgers | 13‍–‍5 | Dodgers, 7‍–‍2 | Dodgers, 6‍–‍3 | Dodgers; 378‍–‍347‍–‍1 | |
| 2012 | Dodgers | 11‍–‍7 | Dodgers, 5‍–‍4 | Dodgers, 6‍–‍3 | Dodgers; 389‍–‍354‍–‍1 | |
| 2013 | Dodgers | 11‍–‍8 | Dodgers, 5‍–‍4 | Dodgers, 6‍–‍4 | Dodgers; 400‍–‍362‍–‍1 | Both AL and NL having balanced teams leads to a balanced schedule of 19 games per season. |
| 2014 | Dodgers | 12‍–‍7 | Dodgers, 7‍–‍3 | Dodgers, 5‍–‍4 | Dodgers; 412‍–‍369‍–‍1 | |
| 2015 | Dodgers | 14‍–‍5 | Dodgers, 7‍–‍2 | Dodgers, 7‍–‍3 | Dodgers; 426‍–‍374‍–‍1 | |
| 2016 | Dodgers | 11‍–‍8 | Dodgers, 6‍–‍4 | Dodgers, 5‍–‍4 | Dodgers; 412‍–‍369‍–‍1 | |
| 2017 | Dodgers | 13‍–‍6 | Dodgers, 8‍–‍2 | Dodgers, 5‍–‍4 | Dodgers; 450‍–‍388‍–‍1 | Dodgers lose 2017 World Series |
| 2018 | Dodgers | 14‍–‍5 | Dodgers, 7‍–‍2 | Dodgers, 7‍–‍3 | Dodgers; 464‍–‍393‍–‍1 | Dodgers lose 2018 World Series |
| 2019 | Dodgers | 13‍–‍6 | Dodgers, 6‍–‍4 | Dodgers, 7‍–‍2 | Dodgers; 477‍–‍399‍–‍1 | |

2020s (Dodgers, 70–42)

| Season | Season series | | at Los Angeles Dodgers | at San Diego Padres | Overall series | Notes |
|---|---|---|---|---|---|---|
| 2020 | Dodgers | 6‍–‍4 | Tie, 2‍–‍2 | Dodgers, 4‍–‍2 | Dodgers; 483‍–‍403‍–‍1 | Season shortened to 60 games (with 10 meetings) by the COVID-19 pandemic. |
| 2020 NLDS | Dodgers | 3‍–‍0 | Dodgers, 2‍–‍0 | Dodgers, 1‍–‍0 | Dodgers; 486‍–‍403‍–‍1 | First meeting in the postseason. Dodgers win 2020 World Series. |
| 2021 | Dodgers | 12‍–‍7 | Dodgers, 7‍–‍3 | Dodgers, 5‍–‍4 | Dodgers; 498‍–‍410‍–‍1 | |
| 2022 | Dodgers | 14‍–‍5 | Dodgers, 8‍–‍2 | Dodgers, 6‍–‍3 | Dodgers; 512‍–‍415‍–‍1 | |
| 2022 NLDS | Padres | 3‍–‍1 | Tie, 1‍–‍1 | Padres, 2‍–‍0 | Dodgers; 513‍–‍418‍–‍1 | Second meeting in the postseason. Padres lose 2022 NLCS. |
| 2023 | Dodgers | 9‍–‍4 | Dodgers, 4‍–‍2 | Dodgers, 5‍–‍2 | Dodgers; 522‍–‍422‍–‍1 | Schedule structure modified this season to allow every team to play one series against every interleague team. Shortening meetings from 19 to 13 games. |
| 2024 | Padres | 8‍–‍5 | Padres, 4‍–‍3 | Padres, 4‍–‍2 | Dodgers; 527‍–‍430‍–‍1 | Both teams play at inaugural MLB Seoul Series to start season, splitting the 2-game series. First season series win for San Diego since 2010. |
| 2024 NLDS | Dodgers | 3‍–‍2 | Dodgers, 2‍–‍1 | Tie, 1‍–‍1 | Dodgers; 530‍–‍432‍–‍1 | Third meeting in the postseason. Dodgers win 2024 World Series. |
| 2025 | Dodgers | 9‍–‍4 | Dodgers, 6‍–‍1 | Tie, 3‍–‍3 | Dodgers; 539‍–‍436‍–‍1 | Dodgers win 2025 World Series |
| 2026 | Dodgers | 8‍–‍5 | Dodgers, 4‍–‍3 | Dodgers, 4‍–‍2 | Dodgers; 547‍–‍441‍–‍1 | |

Summary of Results

| Season | Season series | | at Los Angeles Dodgers | at San Diego Padres | Notes |
|---|---|---|---|---|---|
| Regular season games | Dodgers | 540‍–‍436‍–‍1 | Dodgers, 287‍–‍205 | Dodgers, 253‍–‍231‍–‍1 | |
| Postseason games | Dodgers | 7‍–‍5 | Dodgers, 5‍–‍2 | Padres, 3‍–‍2 | |
| Postseason series | Dodgers | 2‍–‍1 | Dodgers, 2‍–‍0‍–‍1 | Tie, 1‍–‍1‍–‍1 | NLDS: 2020, 2022, 2024 |
| Overall Regular season and postseason | Dodgers | 547‍–‍441‍–‍1 | Dodgers, 292‍–‍207 | Dodgers, 255‍–‍234‍–‍1 | |

== Notable connections between the teams ==
| Name | Position(s) | Dodgers' tenure | Padres' tenure |
|---|---|---|---|
| Andy Ashby | Pitcher | 2001–2003 | 1993–1999; 2004 |
| Matt Beaty | First baseman, outfielder | 2019–2021 | 2022 |
| Milton Bradley | Switch hitter | 2004–2005 | 2007 |
| Kevin Brown | Pitcher | 1999–2003 | 1998 |
| Walker Buehler | Pitcher | 2017–2022, 2024 | 2026–present |
| Yu Darvish | Pitcher | 2017 | 2021–present |
| Steve Garvey | First baseman | 1969–1982 | 1983–1987 |
| Adrián González | First baseman | 2012–2017 | 2006–2010 |
| Yasmani Grandal | Catcher | 2015–2018 | 2012–2014 |
| Tony Gwynn Jr. | Outfielder | 2011–2012 | 2009–2010 |
| Jerry Hairston Jr. | Infielder, outfielder | 2012–2013 | 2010 |
| Dave Hansen | Pinch hitter | 1990–1996; 1999–2002 | 2003–2004 |
| Jason Heyward | Outfielder | 2023–2024 | 2025 |
| Rich Hill | Pitcher | 2016–2019 | 2023 |
| Matt Kemp | Outfielder | 2006–2014, 2018 | 2015–2016 |
| Craig Kimbrel | Pitcher | 2022 | 2015 |
| Eric Lauer | Pitcher | 2026–present | 2018–2019 |
| Grady Little | Manager, hitting coach | 2006–2007 (as manager) | 1996 (as coach) |
| Manny Machado | Third baseman, shortstop | 2018 | 2019–present |
| Greg Maddux | Pitcher | 2006, 2008 | 2007–2008 |
| Fred McGriff | First baseman | 2003 | 1991–1993 |
| Mark McGwire | Hitting coach | 2013–2015 | 2016–2018 |
| Chan Ho Park | Pitcher | 1994–2001; 2008 | 2005–2006 |
| Mike Piazza | Catcher | 1992–1998 | 2006 |
| Johnny Podres | Pitcher | 1953–1966 | 1969 |
| Dave Roberts | Manager, outfielder | 2001–2004 (as player); 2016–present (as manager) | 2005–2006 (as player); 2011–2015 (as coach and interim manager) |
| Tanner Scott | Pitcher | 2025–present | 2024 |
| Gary Sheffield | Outfielder | 1998–2001 | 1992–1993 |
| Blake Snell | Pitcher | 2025–present | 2021–2023 |
| Fernando Valenzuela | Pitcher | 1980–1990 | 1995–1997 |
| Shane Victorino | Outfielder | 1999–2002; 2012 | 2003 |
| David Wells | Pitcher | 2007 | 2004, 2006–2007 |
| Randy Wolf | Pitcher | 2007, 2009 | 2008 |
| Kirby Yates | Pitcher | 2025 | 2017–2020 |

== See also ==
- Major League Baseball rivalries
- Freeway Series
- Dodgers–Giants rivalry
- Bay Bridge Series
- Chargers–Raiders rivalry
- Lakers–Clippers rivalry
- Chargers–Rams rivalry
