= 2024 National League Division Series =

Teams
Team (Wins)		Manager	Season
Los Angeles Dodgers (3)		Dave Roberts	98–64 (.605), GA: 5
San Diego Padres (2)		Mike Shildt	93–69 (.574), GB: 5
- Dates: October 5–11
- Television: FS1 (Games 1–4); Fox (Game 5)
- TV announcers: Joe Davis, John Smoltz, Ken Rosenthal, and Tom Verducci (Game 5)
- Radio: ESPN
- Radio announcers: Roxy Bernstein and Jessica Mendoza
- Umpires: Dan Bellino (crew chief), Cory Blaser, Tripp Gibson, Adrian Johnson, John Libka, Mark Ripperger

Teams
Team (Wins)		Manager	Season
New York Mets (3)		Carlos Mendoza	89–73 (.549), GB: 6
Philadelphia Phillies (1)		Rob Thomson	95–67 (.586), GA: 6
- Dates: October 5–9
- Television: Fox (Game 1); FS1 (Games 2–4)
- TV announcers: Adam Amin, A. J. Pierzynski, Adam Wainwright, and Tom Verducci
- Radio: ESPN
- Radio announcers: Jon Sciambi and Doug Glanville
- Umpires: Rob Drake, Doug Eddings, Andy Fletcher, James Hoye (crew chief), Edwin Moscoso, Carlos Torres
- NLWC: New York Mets over Milwaukee Brewers (2–1); San Diego Padres over Atlanta Braves (2–0)

The 2024 National League Division Series (NLDS) were the two best-of-five playoff series in Major League Baseball's (MLB) 2024 postseason to determine the participating teams of the 2024 National League Championship Series (NLCS). These matchups were:

- (1) Los Angeles Dodgers (NL West champions) vs. (4) San Diego Padres (Wild Card Series winner): Dodgers won the series, 3–2.
- (2) Philadelphia Phillies (NL East champions) vs. (6) New York Mets (Wild Card Series winner): Mets won the series, 3–1.

The team with the better regular season record (higher seed) of each series hosts Games 1, 2, and (if necessary) 5, while the lower seeded team hosts Games 3 and (if necessary) 4.

The Dodgers would go on to defeat the New York Mets in the NLCS in six games, and then win the World Series over the Mets fellow Subway Series rival New York Yankees in five games.

== Background ==
The top two division winners (first two seeds) are determined by regular season winning percentages. The final two teams are the winners of the National League Wild Card Series, played between the league's third to sixth-seeded teams.

The Los Angeles Dodgers (98–64) clinched their 12th consecutive postseason berth on September 19, won the National League West and earned a first-round bye on September 26, and clinched the best record in both NL and MLB on September 28, giving them home-field advantage through the World Series. With their 12th consecutive postseason appearance, the Dodgers currently hold the longest active playoff streak in major North American professional sports. They played the San Diego Padres (93–69), who qualified for the postseason as the fourth seed wild card entrant. They swept the fifth-seeded Atlanta Braves in the Wild Card Series for the Padres to return to the NLDS for the third time in the past five seasons. San Diego won the season series against Los Angeles, 8–5, and it was the first time the Padres won a season series against their rivals since 2010 (which is also the last year they won 90 games). This was a continuation of the Dodgers-Padres rivalry and the third postseason meeting between the two teams. Their previous playoff meetings were in the 2020 NLDS and the 2022 NLDS in which the Dodgers swept the former series and the Padres won the latter series in one of the biggest upsets in postseason history. This was the fifth straight year for an all-National League West match-up in the NLDS. (Note: The previous National League West match-ups in the NLDS were: * 2020 NLDS: Dodgers vs. Padres * 2021 NLDS: Giants vs. Dodgers * 2022 NLDS: Dodgers vs. Padres * 2023 NLDS: Dodgers vs. Diamondbacks)

The Philadelphia Phillies (95–67) clinched a postseason berth on September 20, won the National League East on September 23, and clinched a first-round bye on September 25 It was the Phillies third straight postseason and it represented their first appearance as NL East champions since 2011. They played the New York Mets (89–73), who qualified for the postseason as the sixth-seed wild card entrant due to their head-to-head record versus the Atlanta Braves, the team they finished tied with. New York, which was 11 games under .500 at one point in the season, was the third straight sixth seed to make it out of the Wild Card series round in the National League. They did this by defeating the Milwaukee Brewers in three games, due in part to a Pete Alonso three-run home run in the top of the ninth inning that gave the Mets the lead and eventual series-win; this was their first NLDS trip since their pennant season of 2015. The Phillies won the season series over the Mets, 7–6. This was the first postseason meeting of the Phillies and Mets, who have been rivals since the creation of the Mets franchise in 1962 but have had mutual winning seasons only ten times in 63 years of co-existence. This was also the third straight year the NLDS featured an all-National League East match-up, with the Braves versus Phillies occurring in 2022 and 2023.

== Matchups ==
=== Los Angeles Dodgers vs. San Diego Padres ===
Los Angeles won the series, 3–2.

Game	Date	Score	Location	Time	Attendance
1	October 5	San Diego Padres – 5, Los Angeles Dodgers – 7	Dodger Stadium	3:36	53,028
2	October 6	San Diego Padres – 10, Los Angeles Dodgers – 2	Dodger Stadium	3:03	54,119
3	October 8	Los Angeles Dodgers – 5, San Diego Padres – 6	Petco Park	2:34	47,744
4	October 9	Los Angeles Dodgers – 8, San Diego Padres – 0	Petco Park	3:13	47,773
5	October 11	San Diego Padres – 0, Los Angeles Dodgers – 2	Dodger Stadium	2:26	53,183

=== Philadelphia Phillies vs. New York Mets ===
New York won the series, 3–1.

Game	Date	Score	Location	Time	Attendance
1	October 5	New York Mets – 6, Philadelphia Phillies – 2	Citizens Bank Park	3:15	45,751
2	October 6	New York Mets – 6, Philadelphia Phillies – 7	Citizens Bank Park	3:13	45,679
3	October 8	Philadelphia Phillies – 2, New York Mets – 7	Citi Field	2:55	44,093
4	October 9	Philadelphia Phillies – 1, New York Mets – 4	Citi Field	3:15	44,103

== Los Angeles vs. San Diego ==
This was the third postseason meeting between the Los Angeles Dodgers and the San Diego Padres. Their previous playoff meetings were in the 2020 NLDS, which Los Angeles won in a three-game sweep, and the 2022 NLDS, which San Diego won in four games in one of the biggest upsets in postseason history.

=== Game 1 ===
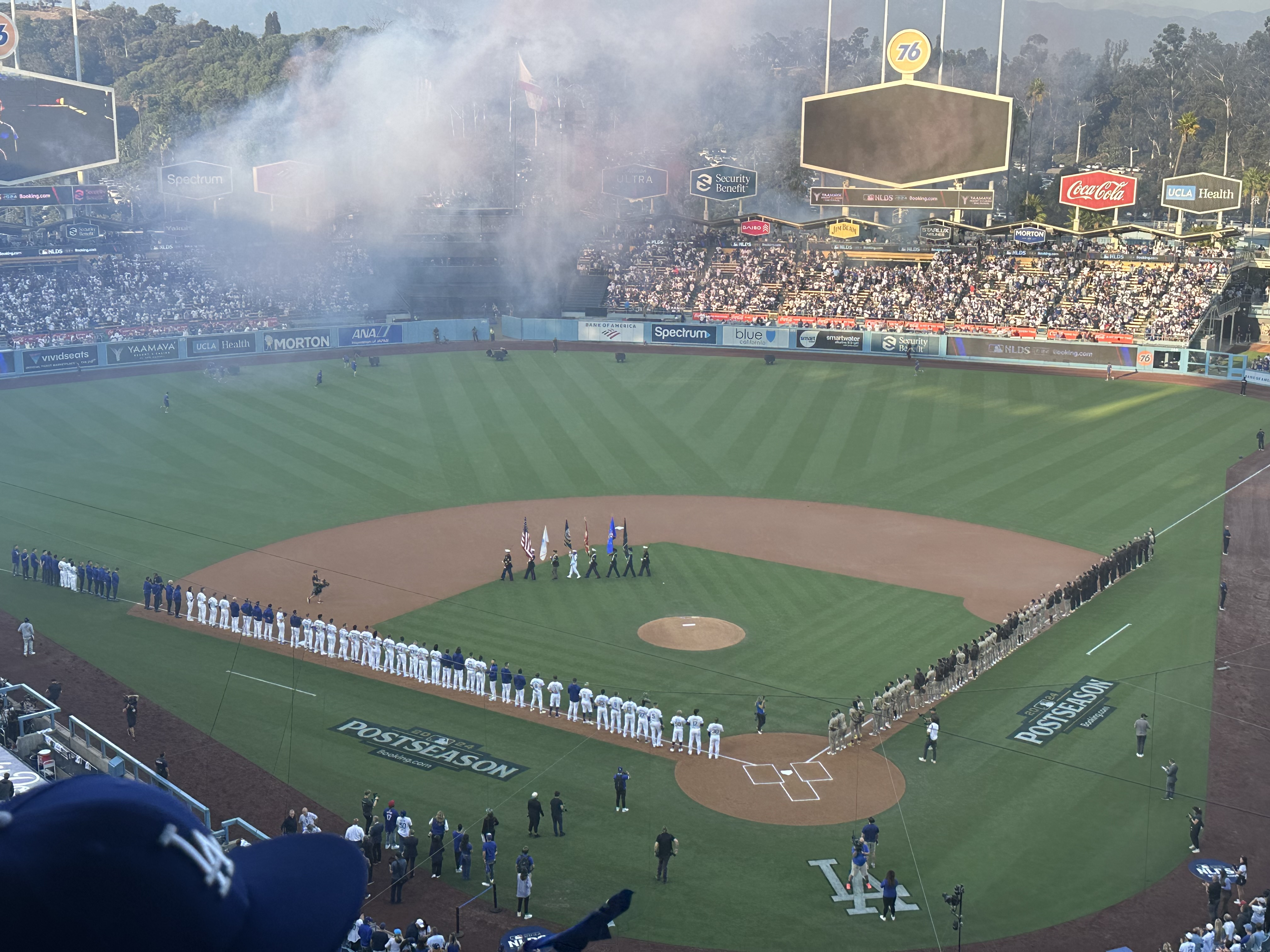
Player introductions prior to the playing of Game 1 of the 2024 NLDS at Dodger Stadium

October 5, 2024 5:38 pm (PDT) at Dodger Stadium in Los Angeles, California 77 °F (25 °C), Clear
Team	1	2	3	4	5	6	7	8	9	R	H	E
San Diego	3	0	2	0	0	0	0	0	0	5	7	1
Los Angeles	0	3	0	3	1	0	0	0	X	7	10	0
WP: Ryan Brasier (1–0) LP: Adrián Morejón (0–1) Sv: Blake Treinen (1); Home runs: SD: Manny Machado (1); LAD: Shohei Ohtani (1); Attendance: 53,028; Boxscore

Game 1 featured starters Dylan Cease for the Padres and Yoshinobu Yamamoto for the Dodgers. The Padres jumped to an early lead in the top of the first when Luis Arráez scored on an RBI groundout by Jurickson Profar, then Manny Machado hit a two-run home run to extend the lead to three runs. In the bottom of the second, Shohei Ohtani hit his first playoff home run, a three-run shot to tie the game. In the top of the third, Xander Bogaerts hit a two-run RBI double to score Jackson Merrill and Fernando Tatís Jr., giving San Diego a 5–3 lead. In the bottom of the fourth, Tommy Edman scored on a wild pitch, bringing the Dodgers within one. Teoscar Hernández delivered a two-run single that scored Ohtani and Mookie Betts, as the Dodgers took the lead for the first time in the game. In the bottom of the fifth, Will Smith scored from third while Edman grounded into double play, extending the Dodgers' lead to 7–5. In the top of the eighth, Blake Treinen escaped a two-out bases-loaded jam to preserve a 7–5 lead for the Dodgers and he then closed out the side with a five-out save, winning Game 1 for Los Angeles and a 1–0 series lead.

With the victory, the Dodgers won their first playoff game since Game 1 of the 2022 NLDS against the same opponent.

=== Game 2 ===
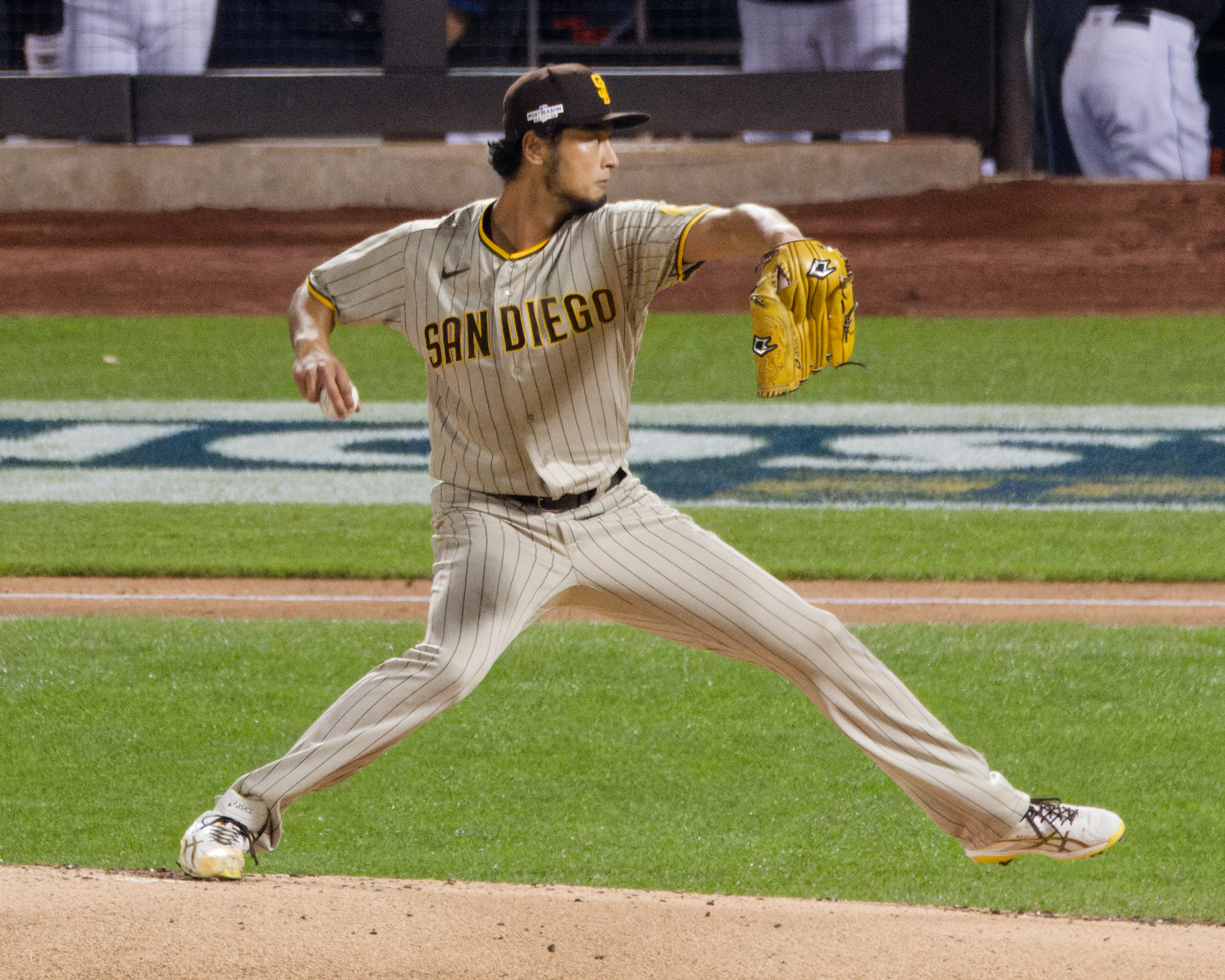
Yu Darvish pitched 7 innings of one-run ball and picked up the win in Game 2.

October 6, 2024 5:03 pm (PDT) at Dodger Stadium in Los Angeles, California 79 °F (26 °C), Clear
Team	1	2	3	4	5	6	7	8	9	R	H	E
San Diego	1	2	0	0	0	1	0	3	3	10	13	0
Los Angeles	0	1	0	0	0	0	0	0	1	2	5	0
WP: Yu Darvish (1–0) LP: Jack Flaherty (0–1); Home runs: SD: Fernando Tatís Jr. 2 (2), David Peralta (1), Jackson Merrill (1), Xander Bogaerts (1), Kyle Higashioka (1); LAD: Max Muncy (1); Attendance: 54,119; Boxscore

Game 2 started with a solo home run from Fernando Tatís Jr. off Jack Flaherty in the top of the first to give the Padres the early lead. In the bottom of the first, Jurickson Profar robbed Mookie Betts of a potential game-tying home run with a leaping catch. In the top of the second, David Peralta hit a two-run home run as the Padres extended their lead to 3–0. In the bottom of the second, Gavin Lux hit a sacrifice fly, scoring Teoscar Hernández, cutting the Padres' lead to 3–1. In the top of the sixth, Jackson Merrill hit an RBI single off Anthony Banda to score Tatís as the Padres extended their lead to 4–1. Prior to the bottom of the seventh, Dodgers fans appeared to throw objects on the field from the stands, apparently aimed at Profar, which caused an on-field delay for roughly 12 minutes with security officers, umpires, and some Padres teammates on the field addressed the situation. In the top of the eighth, Merrill hit a two-run home run off Ryan Brasier to score Manny Machado as the Padres further extended their lead to 6–1. Additionally, Merrill's home run was the first postseason home run of his career. Xander Bogaerts then hit a solo home run back-to-back off Michael Grove as the Padres further extended their lead to 7–1. In the top of the ninth, Kyle Higashioka hit a solo home run off Edgardo Henriquez to extend the Padres' lead to 8–1. Tatís then hit a two-run home run to score Luis Arráez giving the Padres a 10–1 lead. With that home run, the Padres set a postseason franchise record and tied an MLB postseason record with six home runs in a single game. The Padres are the first team in Major League Baseball history to hit six home runs in a single postseason game on the road. The Dodgers got one more run in the bottom of the ninth when Max Muncy hit a solo home run off Alek Jacob. Jacob then closed the game by striking out Gavin Lux for the final out of the game for the Padres to take Game 2 and even the series one game apiece.

=== Game 3 ===
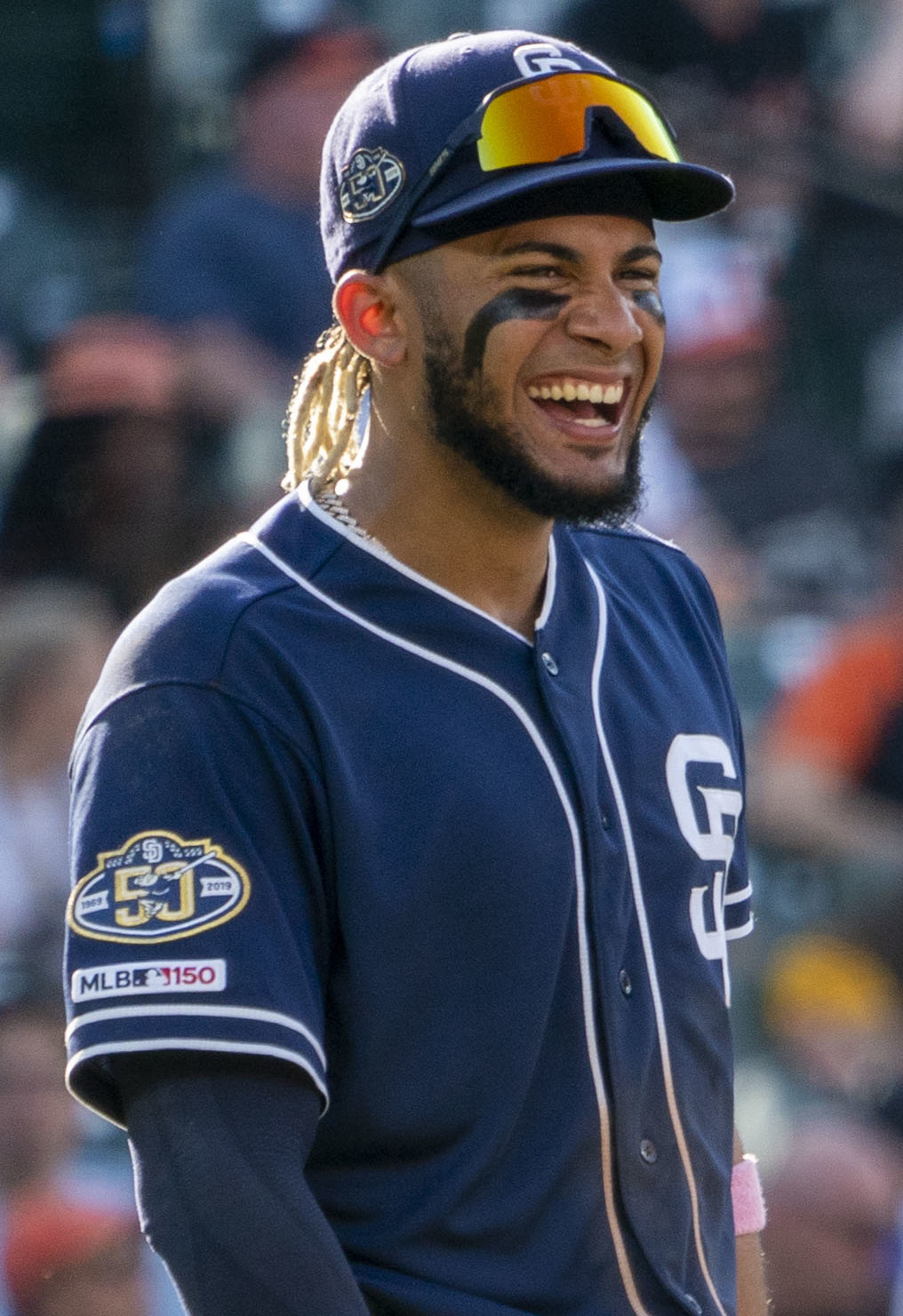
Fernando Tatis Jr. hit the deciding two-run homer in Game 3.

October 8, 2024 6:08 pm (PDT) at Petco Park in San Diego, California 68 °F (20 °C), Clear
Team	1	2	3	4	5	6	7	8	9	R	H	E
Los Angeles	1	0	4	0	0	0	0	0	0	5	6	1
San Diego	0	6	0	0	0	0	0	0	X	6	7	0
WP: Michael King (1–0) LP: Walker Buehler (0–1) Sv: Robert Suárez (1); Home runs: LAD: Mookie Betts (1), Teoscar Hernández (1); SD: Fernando Tatís Jr. (3); Attendance: 47,744; Boxscore

The Dodgers scored first, with Mookie Betts hitting a solo home run off Michael King in the top of the first. The Padres answered in the bottom of the second, starting with Xander Bogaerts reaching first base via a fielder's choice and scoring Manny Machado, followed by a double by David Peralta that scored both Jackson Merrill and Bogaerts. A sacrifice fly by Kyle Higashioka scored Peralta, and Fernando Tatís Jr. ended the inning with a two-run home run off Walker Buehler to make the score 6–1. In the top of the third, Teoscar Hernández hit a grand slam to shrink the Padres' lead to one run. Both bullpens kept the game scoreless the rest of the way, with Robert Suárez getting a four-out save for the Padres, giving them the lead in the series. Tatis' home run would prove to be the last runs the Padres scored in the series, and the season.

=== Game 4 ===
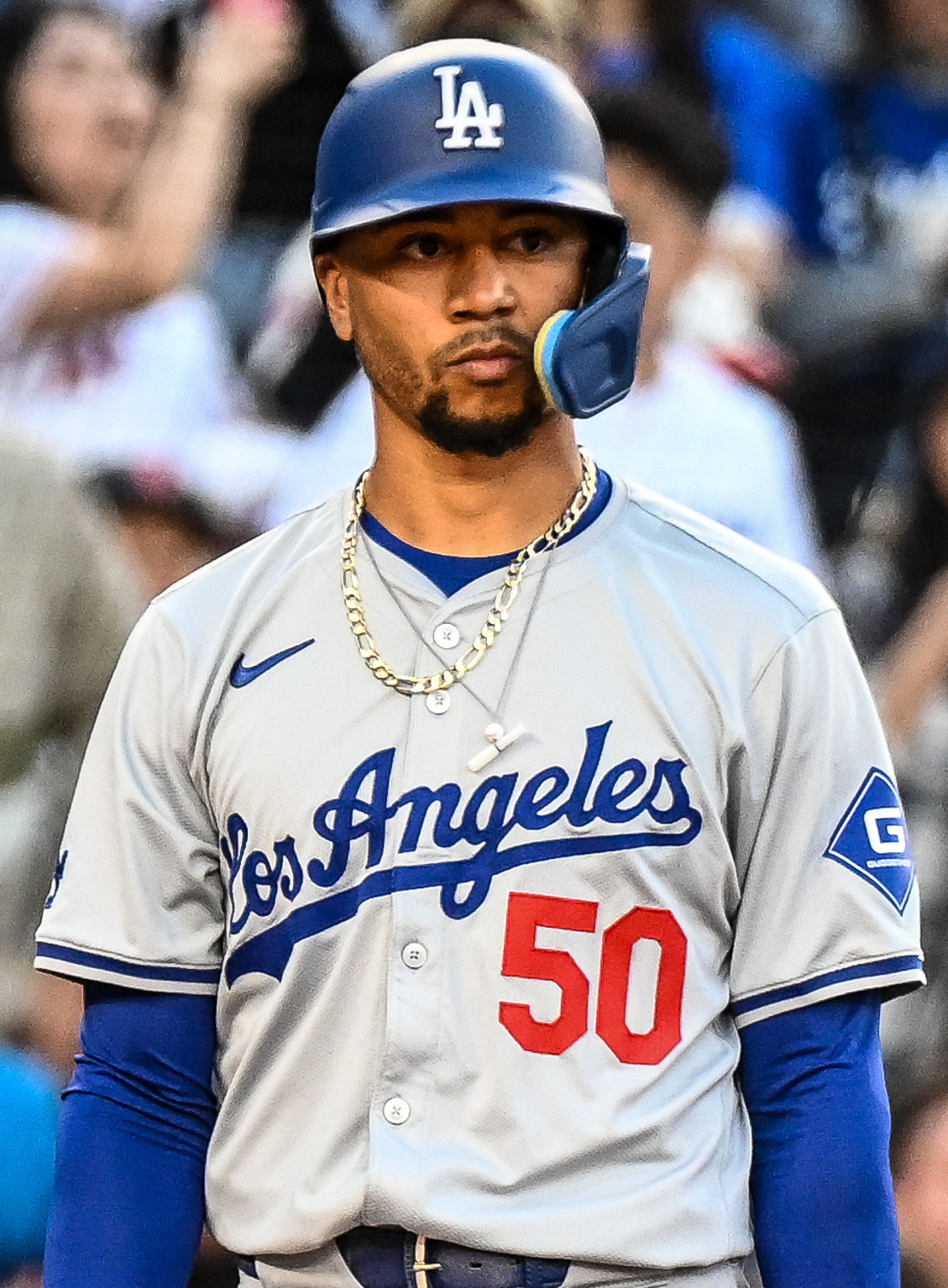
Mookie Betts hit a first inning home run for the second game in a row in Game 4.

October 9, 2024 6:08 pm (PDT) at Petco Park in San Diego, California 67 °F (19 °C), Clear
Team	1	2	3	4	5	6	7	8	9	R	H	E
Los Angeles	1	2	2	0	0	0	3	0	0	8	12	0
San Diego	0	0	0	0	0	0	0	0	0	0	7	1
WP: Evan Phillips (1–0) LP: Dylan Cease (0–1); Home runs: LAD: Mookie Betts (2), Will Smith (1), Gavin Lux (1); SD: None; Attendance: 47,773; Boxscore

The Padres started Dylan Cease on three days rest for the first time in his career, while the Dodgers opened with Ryan Brasier in a bullpen game. The Padres were in position to take another series over the favored Dodgers in nearly identical fashion as in 2022; Los Angeles also was without injured all-star Freddie Freeman. Despite the apparent pitching disadvantage, the Dodgers bullpen held San Diego while Cease allowed a Mookie Betts solo home run in the first, his second consecutive first-inning home run. Shohei Ohtani hit a two-out RBI single in the top of the second to chase Cease from the game, and Betts followed with another RBI single to extend the Dodgers' lead to 3–0. In the top of the third, Will Smith hit a two-run home run off Bryan Hoeing to extend the Dodgers' lead to 5–0. In the top of the seventh, Tommy Edman hit a sacrifice bunt, scoring Max Muncy to extend the Dodgers' lead to 6–0. Gavin Lux then hit a two-run home run off Wandy Peralta to increase the Dodgers' lead to 8–0. Eight Dodger relievers combined to shut out the Padres to force a winner-take-all Game 5 back in Los Angeles.

=== Game 5 ===
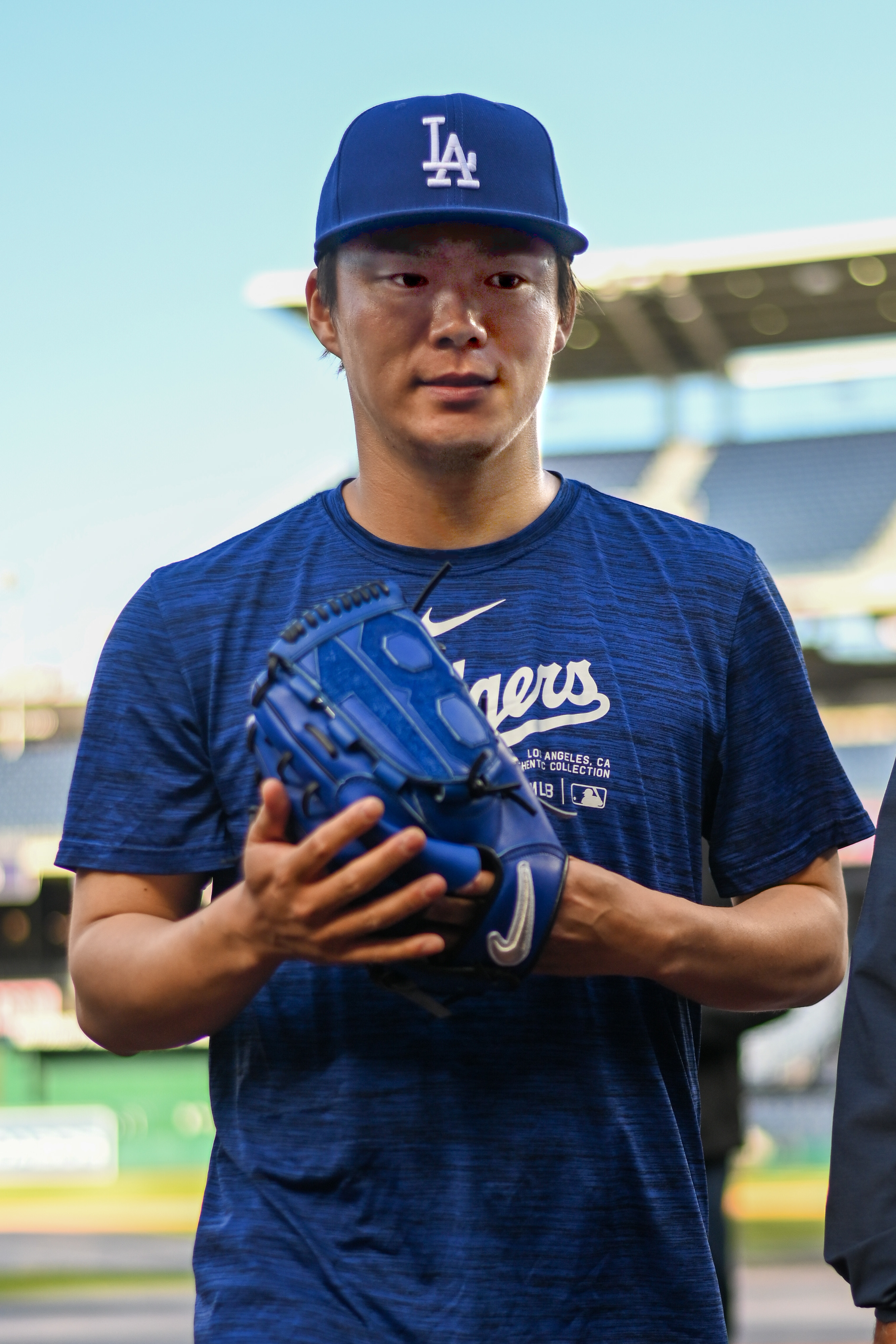
Yoshinobu Yamamoto pitched five scoreless innings in Game 5.

October 11, 2024 5:08 pm (PDT) at Dodger Stadium in Los Angeles, California 80 °F (27 °C), Partly Cloudy
Team	1	2	3	4	5	6	7	8	9	R	H	E
San Diego	0	0	0	0	0	0	0	0	0	0	2	0
Los Angeles	0	1	0	0	0	0	1	0	X	2	4	0
WP: Yoshinobu Yamamoto (1–0) LP: Yu Darvish (1–1) Sv: Blake Treinen (2); Home runs: SD: None; LAD: Enrique Hernández (1), Teoscar Hernández (2); Attendance: 53,183; Boxscore

This was just the fourth winner-take-all postseason game in San Diego's history (their third in just five seasons) and Los Angeles' 17th such game (including their shared history in Brooklyn).

Game 5 marked the first matchup between two Japanese-born starting pitchers (Yu Darvish and Yoshinobu Yamamoto) in the history of the Major League Baseball postseason. In the bottom of the second, Enrique Hernández hit a solo home run off Darvish to put the Dodgers on the board 1–0. Yamamoto allowed only two hits and one walk in five scoreless innings. In the bottom of the seventh, Teoscar Hernández hit a solo home run off Darvish to extend the Dodgers' lead to 2–0. Blake Treinen closed out the Padres to seal the series with a second consecutive shutout for the Dodgers to advance to the NLCS for the first time since 2021.

The Dodgers held the Padres scoreless for the last 24 innings of the series.

=== Composite line score ===
2024 NLDS (3–2): Los Angeles Dodgers beat San Diego Padres

Team	1	2	3	4	5	6	7	8	9	R	H	E
San Diego Padres	4	8	2	0	0	1	0	3	3	21	36	2
Los Angeles Dodgers	2	7	6	3	1	0	4	0	1	24	37	1
Total attendance: 255,847 Average attendance: 51,169

== Philadelphia vs. New York ==
This was the first postseason meeting between the Philadelphia Phillies and the New York Mets.

=== Game 1 ===
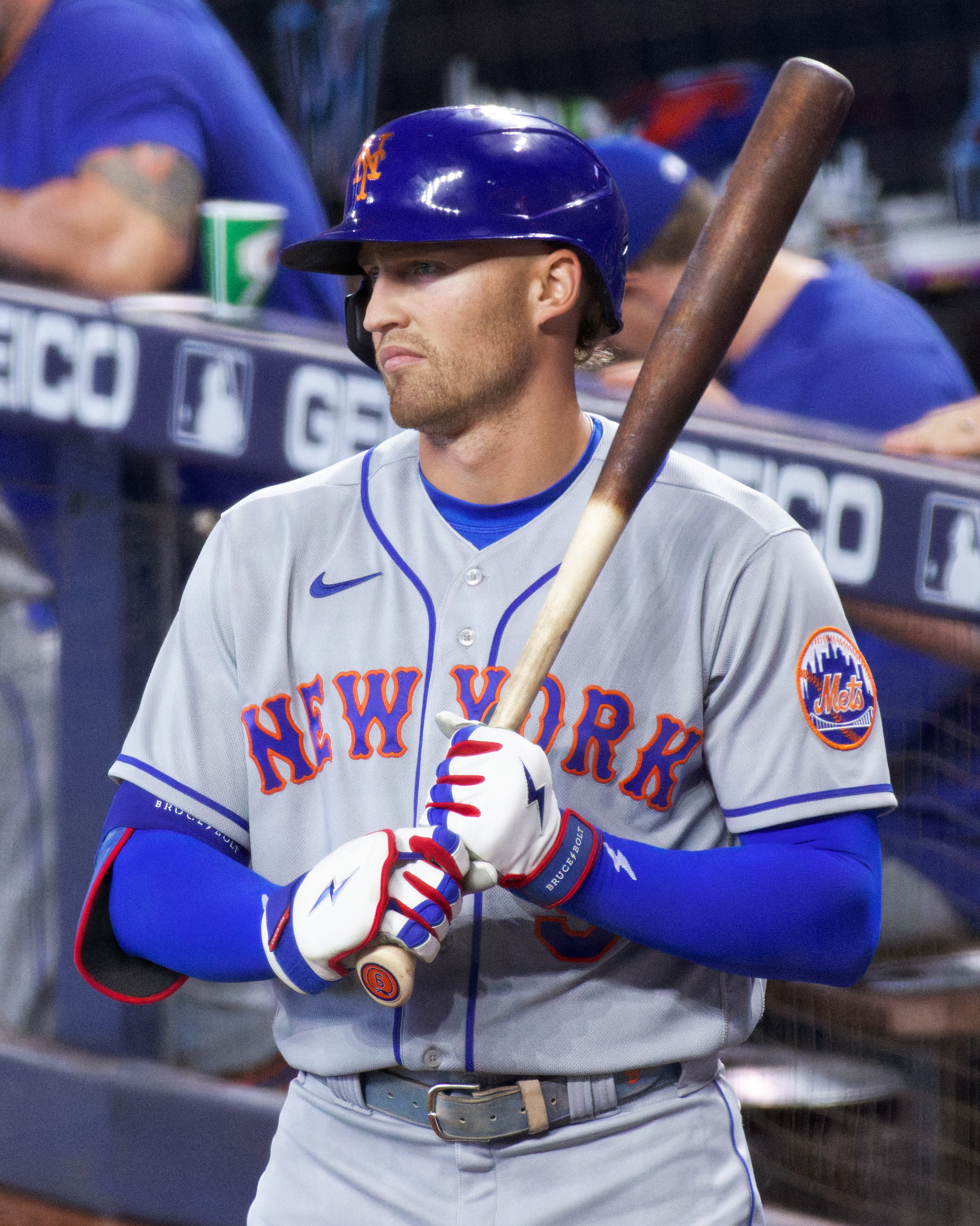
Brandon Nimmo drove in two runs for the Mets in Game 1.

October 5, 2024 4:08 pm (EDT) at Citizens Bank Park in Philadelphia, Pennsylvania 77 °F (25 °C), Sunny
Team	1	2	3	4	5	6	7	8	9	R	H	E
New York	0	0	0	0	0	0	0	5	1	6	8	0
Philadelphia	1	0	0	0	0	0	0	0	1	2	5	0
WP: Reed Garrett (1–0) LP: Jeff Hoffman (0–1); Home runs: NYM: None; PHI: Kyle Schwarber (1); Attendance: 45,751; Boxscore

In the bottom of the first, Kyle Schwarber hit a leadoff home run off Kodai Senga for the Phillies early lead. The game went 1–0 for most of the game until the top of the eighth when the Mets tied the game at 1–1 with Mark Vientos hitting an RBI single off Jeff Hoffman to score Harrison Bader. The Mets then took the lead at 2–1 when Brandon Nimmo hit an RBI single off Matt Strahm to score Francisco Lindor. Pete Alonso then hit a sacrifice fly to score Vientos to extend the Mets' lead to 3–1. J. D. Martinez hit an RBI single to score Nimmo, then Starling Marte hit a sacrifice fly to score Jose Iglesias to further extend the Mets' lead to 5–1. In the top of the ninth, Nimmo hit an RBI single off Tanner Banks to bring in another insurance run for Bader to score, extending the Mets' lead to 6–1. In the bottom of the ninth, Kody Clemens hit an RBI double to score J. T. Realmuto, cutting the Phillies' deficit to 6–2. The Mets got the final out of the inning when Schwarber hit a fly ball to Tyrone Taylor, which resulted in the Mets taking Game 1 of the series and a 1–0 series lead.

=== Game 2 ===
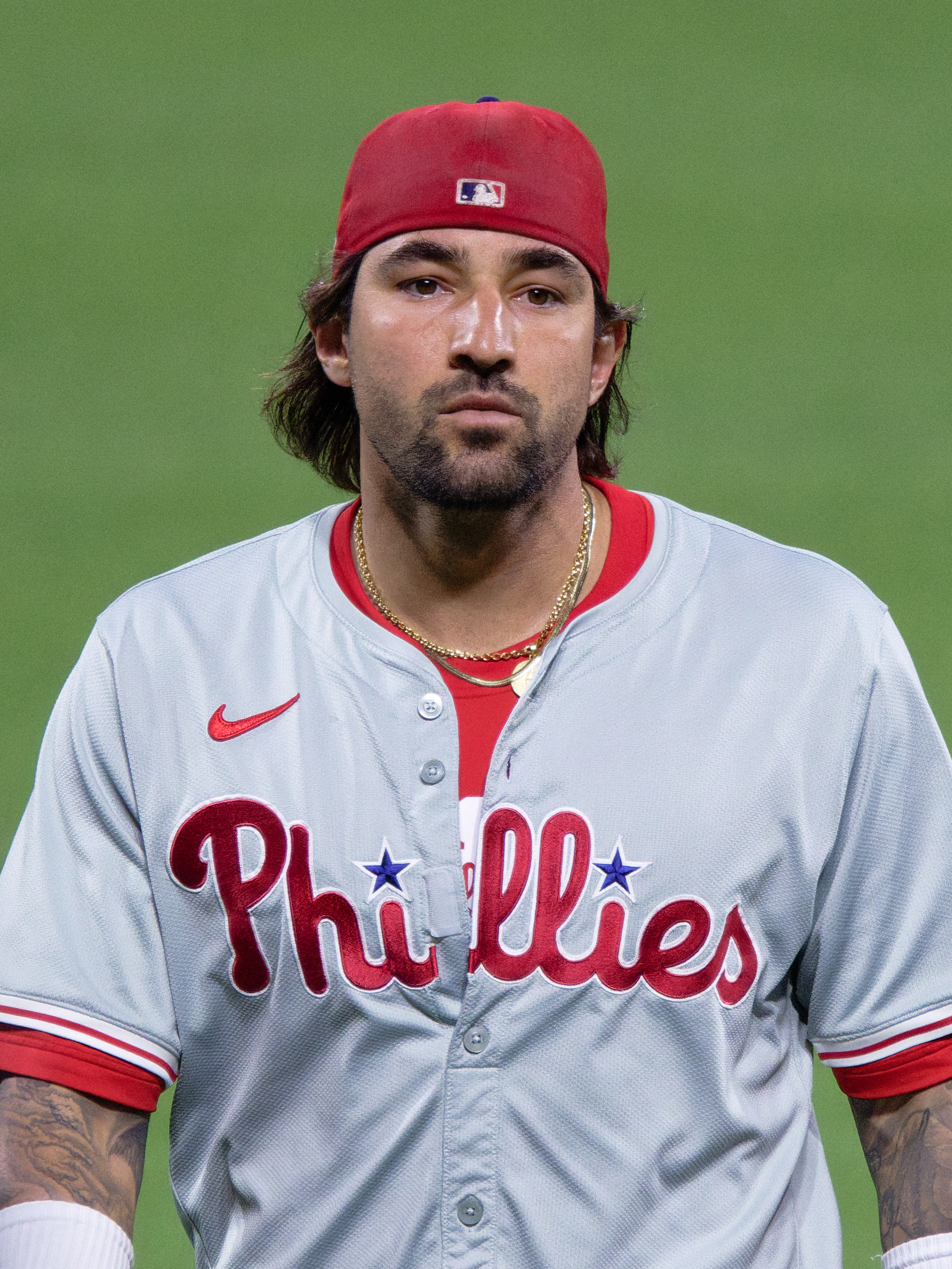
Nick Castellanos delivered the walk-off hit in Game 2.

October 6, 2024 4:08 pm (EDT) at Citizens Bank Park in Philadelphia, Pennsylvania 76 °F (24 °C), Sunny
Team	1	2	3	4	5	6	7	8	9	R	H	E
New York	0	0	2	0	0	1	1	0	2	6	11	1
Philadelphia	0	0	0	0	0	3	0	3	1	7	10	1
WP: Jeff Hoffman (1–1) LP: Tylor Megill (0–1); Home runs: NYM: Mark Vientos 2 (2), Pete Alonso (1), Brandon Nimmo (1); PHI: Bryce Harper (1), Nick Castellanos (1); Attendance: 45,679; Boxscore

In a decisive game two that could see the Phillies put in an 0-2 hole before the two game stretch in Queens, they called on Cristopher Sánchez against the Mets' Luis Severino. In the top of the third, Mark Vientos started the scoring by hitting a two-run home run off Sanchez for the Mets to take a 2–0 lead, scoring Francisco Lindor. This go-ahead home run marked Vientos' first postseason home run. After three more scoreless frames from the Phillies, in the top of the sixth, Pete Alonso extended the lead to 3–0 with a solo home run off José Ruiz. In the bottom of the sixth, it once again looked like Philadelphia would go quietly, with Severino getting the first two outs. But following a Trea Turner single, the Phillies got on the board when Bryce Harper hit a two-run home run to cut the Mets' lead to 3–2. Nick Castellanos then hit a solo home run back-to-back off Severino to tie the game at 3–3. The Mets would respond in the top of the seventh, breaking the tie with a solo home run from Brandon Nimmo off Orion Kerkering, and with that home run, the Mets retook the lead at 4–3.

The Phillies would likewise turn the tables again. In the bottom of the eighth, Philadelphia rallied against Edwin Díaz, putting two runners on before retaking the lead when Bryson Stott hit a two-run triple, flipping the script and giving the Phillies a 5-4 lead. The Phillies then extended the lead to 6–4 when J. T. Realmuto reached first base on a fielder's choice, scoring Stott. But again, the Mets would then return the favor against Matt Strahm down to their final three outs. Following a Lindor single, Vientos hit his second home run of the game to score two more runs for the Mets, tying the game at 6–6. In the bottom of the ninth, the back-and-forth affair looked to be going to extra innings when Tylor Megill got the first two outs. But consecutive full count walks to Turner and Bryce Harper set up Castellanos to be the hero. He would deliver, blasting a line drive down the left field line that Nimmo could only watch sail past him to the wall. Turner easily flied home for the Phillies to take Game 2 and even the series one game apiece.

=== Game 3 ===
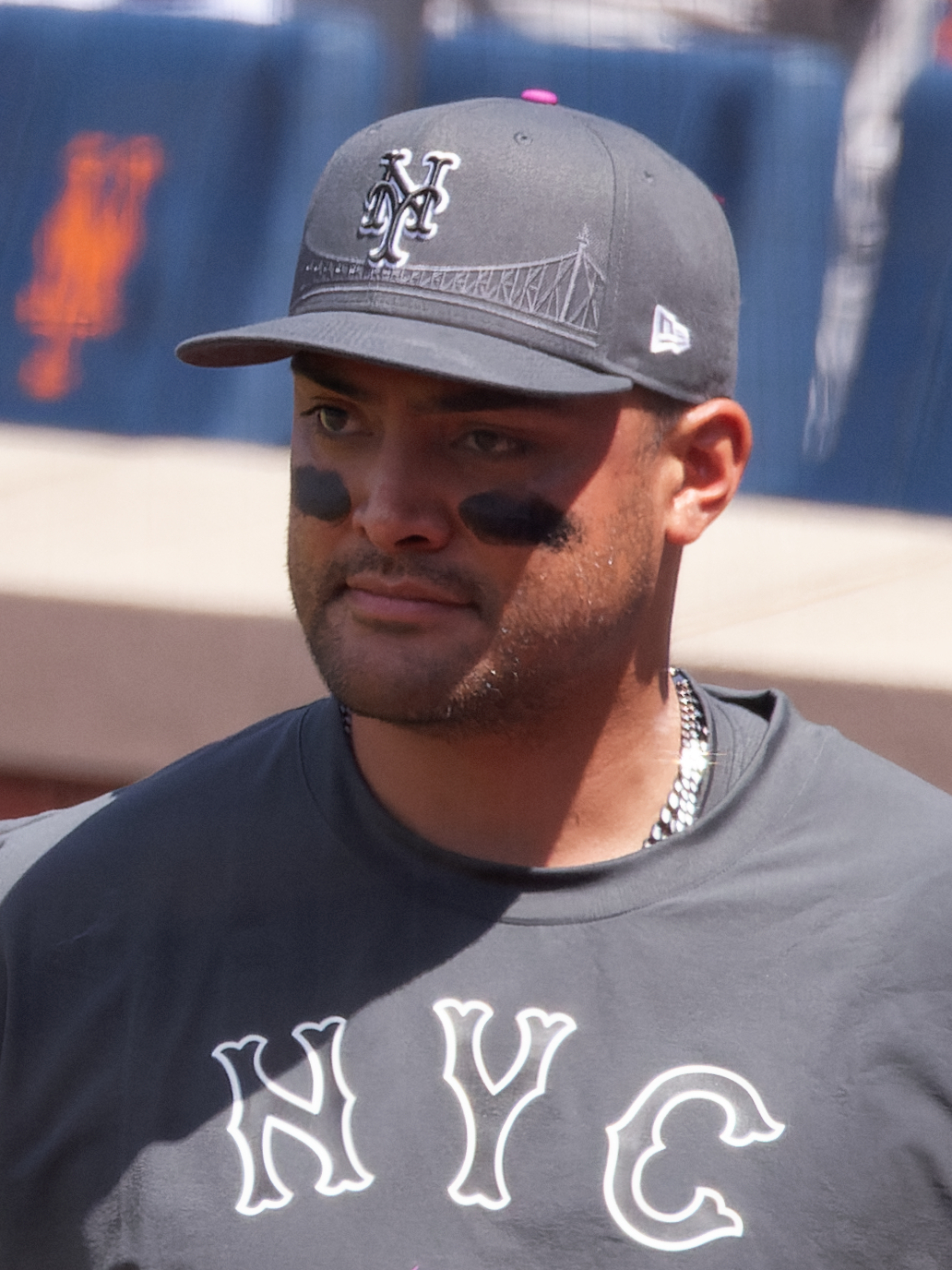
Sean Manaea pitched seven strong innings and earned the win in Game 3.

October 8, 2024 5:08 pm (EDT) at Citi Field at Queens, New York 68 °F (20 °C), Partly Cloudy
Team	1	2	3	4	5	6	7	8	9	R	H	E
Philadelphia	0	0	0	0	0	0	0	2	0	2	5	1
New York	0	1	0	1	0	2	2	1	X	7	9	0
WP: Sean Manaea (1–0) LP: Aaron Nola (0–1); Home runs: PHI: None; NYM: Pete Alonso (2), Jesse Winker (1); Attendance: 44,093; Boxscore

Game 3 would start the Phillies' Aaron Nola against Sean Manaea in front of a raucous New York crowd. Manaea would deliver for the Mets, holding the Phillies scoreless for the first seven innings. Nola was unable to keep up, giving up solo home runs to Pete Alonso in the second and Jesse Winker in the fourth, giving the Mets a 2–0 lead. In the bottom of the sixth, the Mets chased Nola from the game after loading the bases to start the inning. With two outs, Starling Marte then hit a two-run RBI single, scoring Brandon Nimmo and Alonso to extend the Mets' lead to 4–0. In the bottom of the seventh, the Mets once again put runners around the diamond with two outs, and Jose Iglesias hit an RBI single to score two more runs from Nimmo and Harrison Bader before the Phillies tagged Alonso out at home to put a merciful end the inning. The Phillies would finally get some traffic in the eighth, scoring two runs via RBI singles from Bryce Harper and Nick Castellanos as the Phillies cut the lead 6–2. In the bottom of the eighth, the Mets scored another run as Francisco Lindor hit an RBI double, scoring J. D. Martinez and extending their lead to 7–2. Ryne Stanek then closed out the game as the Mets took a 2–1 series lead.

=== Game 4 ===
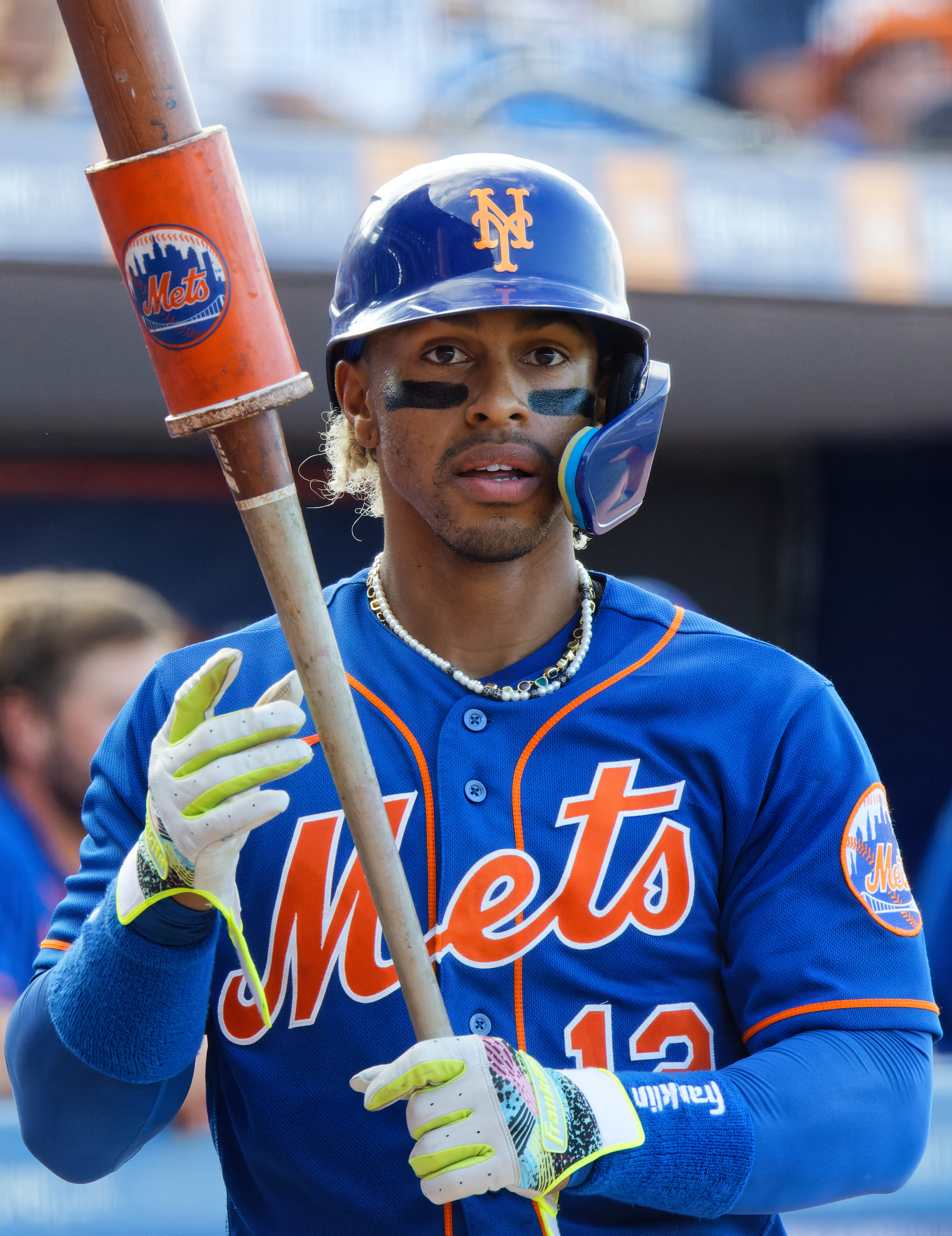
Francisco Lindor hit the series-winning grand slam in Game 4.

October 9, 2024 5:08 pm (EDT) at Citi Field at Queens, New York 66 °F (19 °C), Clear
Team	1	2	3	4	5	6	7	8	9	R	H	E
Philadelphia	0	0	0	1	0	0	0	0	0	1	4	0
New York	0	0	0	0	0	4	0	0	X	4	8	1
WP: David Peterson (1–0) LP: Jeff Hoffman (1–2) Sv: Edwin Díaz (1); Home runs: PHI: None; NYM: Francisco Lindor (1); Attendance: 44,103; Boxscore

In a pivotal affair, the Phillies would call on Ranger Suarez against the Mets' grizzled Jose Quintana. In what would become a recurring theme for the Phillies, Suarez would immediately run into trouble in the first, loading the bases with one out before fanning both Jose Iglesias and J.D. Martinez. In the home second, Starling Marte and Tyrone Taylor led off with hits to put two runners on with no out. After two more strikeouts from Suarez, Mark Vientos once again loaded the bases, but Suarez once again got out of trouble by getting Brandon Nimmo to ground out.

In the top of the fourth inning, the Phillies, quiet thus far, would finally strike. Alec Bohm reached first base on a fielder's choice by Mark Vientos, scoring Bryce Harper and putting the Phillies on the board, 1–0. The Mets responded by once again putting the first two runners on against Suarez in the fifth, prompting the Phillies to end Suarez's dramatic performance. Jeff Hoffman then came in and retired the rest of the Mets. However, the next inning, Hoffman would unravel, loading the bases with zero outs on a single, walk and hit-by-pitch. After getting Francisco Álvarez to ground into a fielder's choice at home that kept the Mets off the board, the Phillies called on Carlos Estévez to face Francisco Lindor. But the Phillies tightroping would finally end, with Lindor hitting a grand slam to right center to give the Mets a 4-1 lead.

The Mets would get a smooth seventh and eighth from David Peterson, but the Phillies would mount one last rally in the ninth. Edwin Díaz was brought in to close the series, but started by walking J. T. Realmuto and Bryson Stott, putting the tying run to the plate with nobody out. But Díaz would then gather himself, getting the next two outs before facing Kyle Schwarber for the final showdown. On a 1-2 count, Diaz struck out the power-hitter swinging for his first postseason save as the Mets advanced to their first NLCS since their 2015 pennant season. The victory also marked the first time that the Mets clinched a playoff series at Citi Field.

=== Composite line score ===
2024 NLDS (3–1): New York Mets beat Philadelphia Phillies

Team	1	2	3	4	5	6	7	8	9	R	H	E
New York Mets	0	1	2	1	0	7	3	6	3	23	36	2
Philadelphia Phillies	1	0	0	1	0	3	0	5	2	12	24	2
Total attendance: 179,626 Average attendance: 44,906

== See also ==
- 2024 American League Division Series
- Dodgers–Padres rivalry
- Mets–Phillies rivalry
