= Andy Fletcher (umpire) =

American baseball umpire (born 1966)

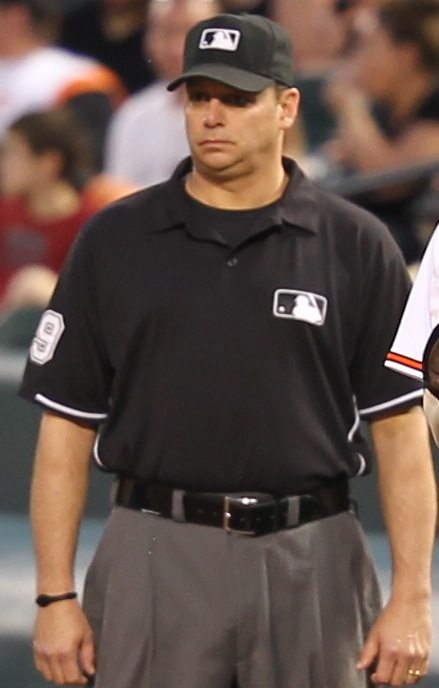
- Fletcher in 2011
- Umpire
- Born: November 17, 1966 (age 59); Memphis, Tennessee, U.S.

MLB debut
- August 24, 1999

Last appearance
- September 25, 2026

Career highlights and awards
- Special assignments: World Series (2024); League Championship Series (2023); Division Series (2018, 2020, 2024); Wild Card Games/Series (2014, 2020, 2022, 2023); All-Star Games (2005, 2018); World Baseball Classic (2009, 2023)

Andrew Jay Fletcher (born November 17, 1966) is an American former umpire in Major League Baseball. He began his major league career in the National League in 1999.

== Career ==
Fletcher attended the Harry Wendelstedt Umpire School in 1989. He spent 10 years in the minor leagues before his MLB promotion in 1999. Fletcher worked in the Appalachian League in 1989, the Florida Instructional League and Midwest League in 1990 and 1991, the Carolina League in 1992, the Southern League from 1992 to 1994, and the Pacific Coast League from 1995 to 1999. He also worked in the Arizona Fall League in 1997.

While in the Southern League in 1994, Fletcher was involved in two arguments with Michael Jordan, during the basketball star's lone season with the Birmingham Barons. One of the two confrontations ended with the ejection of Barons manager Terry Francona.

After becoming a major league umpire, he officiated the 2005 and 2018 Major League Baseball All-Star Games, as well as the 2009 and 2023 World Baseball Classics. His first postseason appearance was in the 2014 National League Wild Card Game. Fletcher has since umpired three more Wild Card Game/Series (2020, 2022, 2023), three Division Series (2018, 2020, 2024), and the 2023 National League Championship Series, culminating in being selected to work the 2024 World Series.

Fletcher was promoted to crew chief in 2025. On July 5, 2026, USA Today's Bob Nightengale reported that Fletcher was one of seven umpires who had accepted a buyout from Major League Baseball to retire after the 2026 season.

== Notable games ==
Fletcher was the third base umpire for Félix Hernández's perfect game against the Tampa Bay Rays on August 15, 2012.

On June 25, 2015, Fletcher was involved in an infamous altercation with Chicago Cubs pitcher Jon Lester. According to Lester, the pitcher yelled at himself in frustration for issuing ball four to A.J. Ellis of the Dodgers. Fletcher interpreted Lester's exclamation as directed at his strike-calling and began to make his way to the mound, yelling at Lester. Catcher David Ross blocked his path (at one point inadvertently making contact with Fletcher) trying to calm him down. This occurred unbeknownst to Lester, who had walked behind the mound and still had his back turned. A perplexed Lester turned to see manager Joe Maddon running out to confront Fletcher. Maddon and Fletcher exchanged heated words for an extended time, yet Fletcher never threw any of the players or the manager out.

On September 7, 2018, Fletcher was the home plate umpire in a controversial game between the Colorado Rockies and the Los Angeles Dodgers, in which his strike zone drew backlash from both teams and their commentating crew, including Jeff Huson of the Rockies and Orel Hershiser of the Dodgers. Fletcher ejected Colorado manager Bud Black for arguing a questionable balk call in the fifth inning of the game.

On May 21, 2022, Fletcher was the home plate umpire for the much-anticipated debut of Baltimore Orioles Catcher Adley Rutschman.

== Personal life ==
Fletcher attended Harding Academy of Memphis and the University of Mississippi. He lives in Olive Branch, Mississippi, with his wife and child.

== See also ==
- List of Major League Baseball umpires (disambiguation)
