= Jayce Tingler =

American baseball player and coach (born 1980)

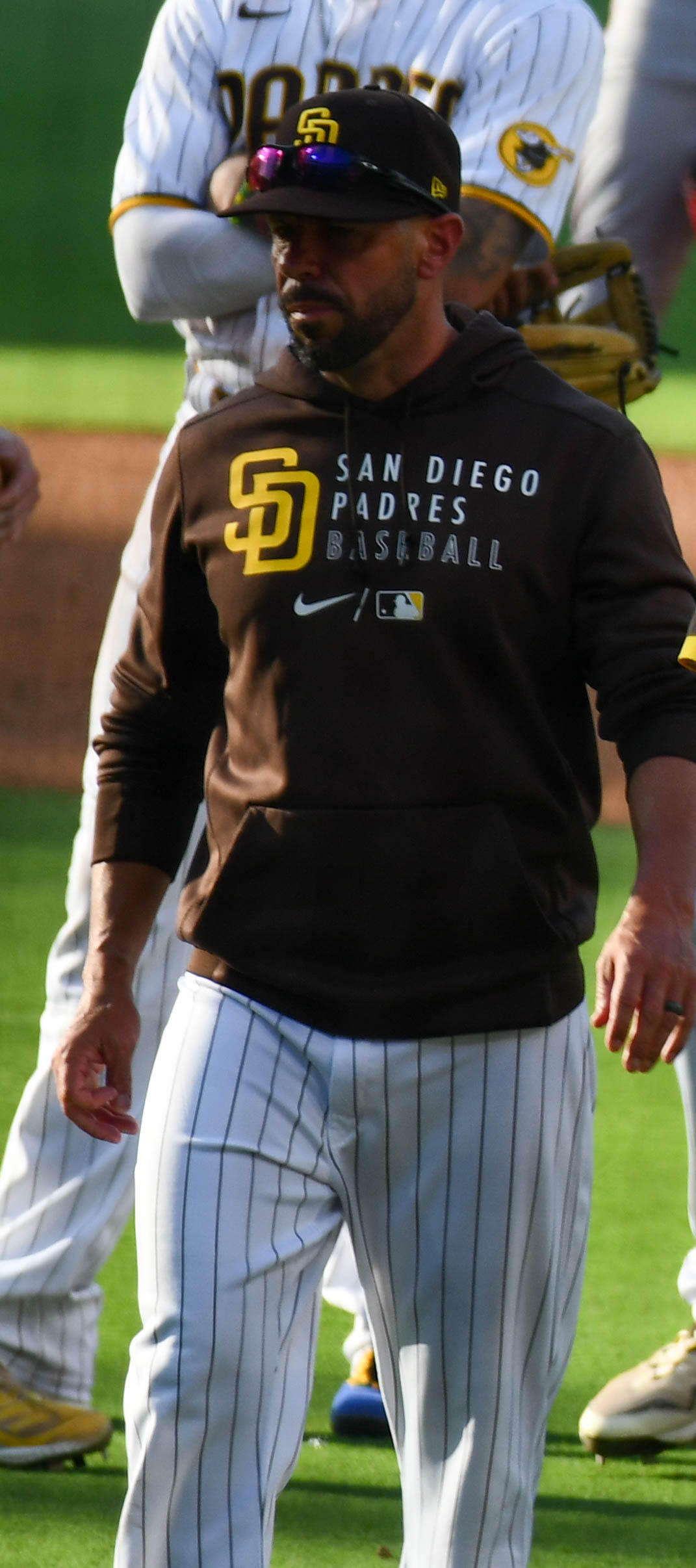
- Tingler with the San Diego Padres in 2021

San Francisco Giants – No. 33
- Coach / Manager
- Born: November 28, 1980 (age 45); Smithville, Missouri, U.S.
- Bats: Left Throws: Left

Career statistics (through 2022 season)
- Win–loss record: 119–107
- Winning %: .527
- Stats at Baseball Reference

Teams
- As manager: San Diego Padres (2020–2021); As coach: Texas Rangers (2015–2016, 2018–2019); Minnesota Twins (2022–2025); San Francisco Giants (2026–present)

Jayce Michael Tingler (born November 28, 1980) is an American professional baseball coach and manager. He is the bench coach for the San Francisco Giants of Major League Baseball (MLB). He previously served as manager of MLB's San Diego Padres from 2020 to 2021. He previously served as the major league player development field coordinator and assistant general manager for the Texas Rangers. He was also the bench coach for the Minnesota Twins. He played college baseball for the Missouri Tigers.

== Early life ==
Tingler graduated from Smithville High School in Smithville, Missouri. He was named to four All-Midland Empire Conference teams in baseball.

== College career ==
He attended the University of Missouri, where he played college baseball for the Missouri Tigers baseball team. Tingler played for the Brewster Whitecaps of the Cape Cod League during the summer of 2002 and was named a league all-star. He was named All-Big 12 Conference in 2003, his senior year.

The Toronto Blue Jays selected Tingler in the tenth round of the 2003 Major League Baseball draft. The Texas Rangers selected Tingler from the Blue Jays in the Triple-A phase of the Rule 5 draft after the 2005 season. He played in Minor League Baseball for four seasons, reaching Double-A.

== Coaching/front office career ==
=== Minor leagues ===
Tingler became a minor league coach for the Dominican Summer League Rangers in 2007. He was the manager for the DSL Rangers in 2008 and 2009, recording first-place finishes each season. He became the manager of the Arizona Rangers of the Rookie-level Arizona League in 2010, leading them to a first-place finish. He was named the coordinator of instruction of Arizona and Dominican Operations in 2011 for the Rangers. Tingler was elevated to the role of minor league field coordinator for the 2012 through 2014 seasons.

=== Texas Rangers ===
The Rangers promoted Tingler to their major league coaching staff as major league field coordinator for the 2015 season, serving on the coaching staff of Jeff Banister for two seasons. In November 2016, after the departure of Thad Levine to the Minnesota Twins, the Rangers named Tingler one of their three assistant general managers.

After Rangers' manager Jeff Banister was fired with ten games left in the 2018 season, Tingler was moved from the front office to the coaching staff, as the interim bench coach for the remainder of the season. Following the 2018 season, he interviewed for the open managerial position, which ultimately went to Chris Woodward. Tingler served as the major league player development field coordinator for the Rangers in 2019.

=== Leones del Escogido ===
Tingler served as the manager of Leones del Escogido for the first 10 games of the 2019–2020 Dominican Winter League season, before leaving to pursue another job opportunity.

=== San Diego Padres ===
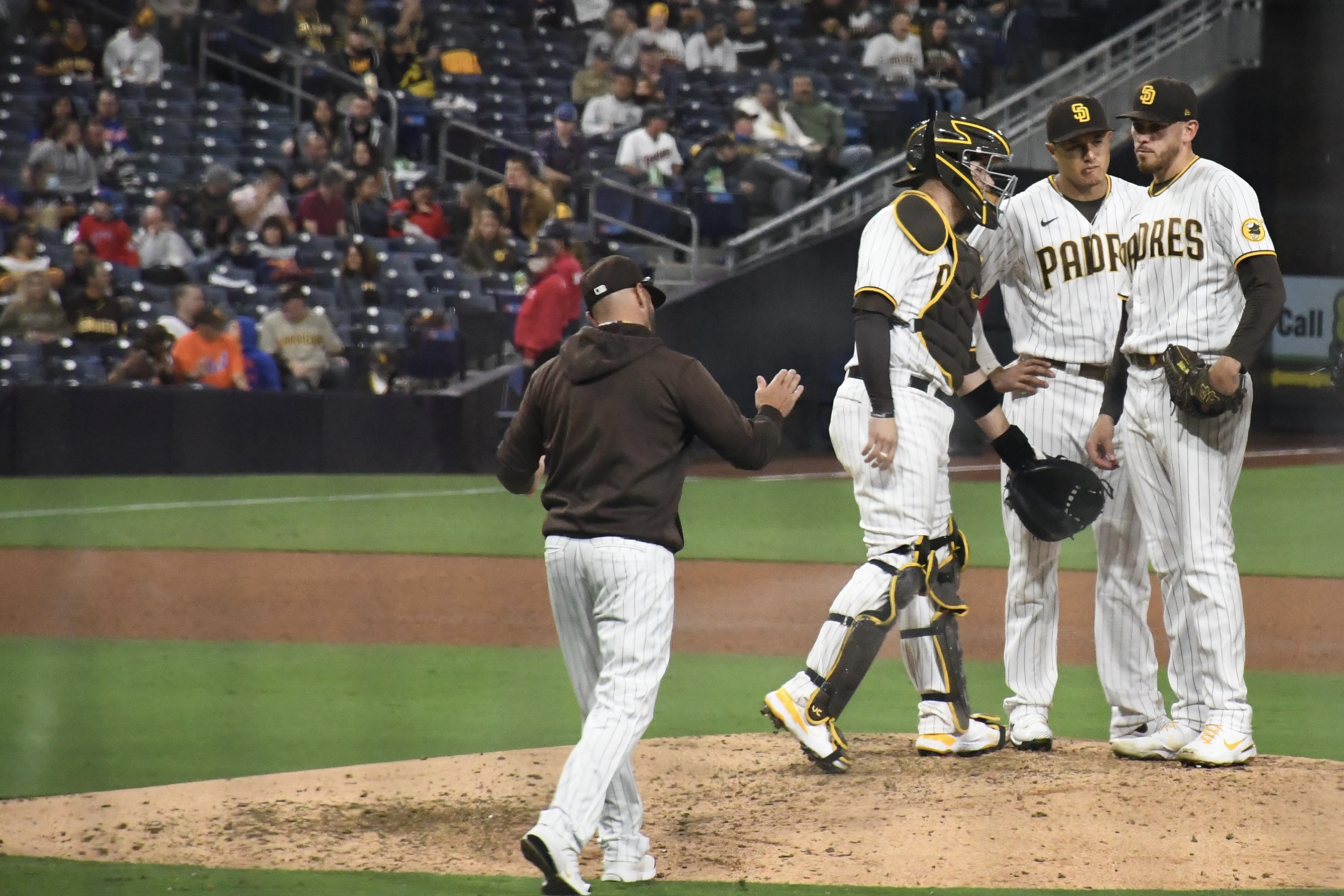
Tingler arriving at mound to remove starting pitcher Joe Musgrove from a game during the 2021 season

On October 28, 2019, Tingler was named the manager of the San Diego Padres after the firing of Andy Green. Tingler signed a three-year contract.

In August 2020, Tingler publicly criticized one of his players, Fernando Tatís Jr., who was accused of breaking an "unwritten rule of baseball" by hitting a grand slam on a 3–0 pitch while the Padres were leading the Texas Rangers 10–3 in the top of the eighth inning. Tingler argued that Tatís should not have swung at the pitch. He faced criticism for his remarks.

In his first season as manager, Tingler led the Padres back into the MLB postseason for the first time since 2006. The Padres defeated the St. Louis Cardinals in the Wild Card Series before losing to the Los Angeles Dodgers in the National League Division Series. After the season, Tingler was nominated for the 2020 National League Manager of the Year award; he finished second to Miami Marlins manager Don Mattingly.

The Padres fired Tingler on October 6, 2021, following a season in which the team finished 79–83 and missed the playoffs.

=== Minnesota Twins ===
On November 8, 2021, the Minnesota Twins hired Tingler as their bench coach. While manager Rocco Baldelli was recovering from COVID, Tingler stepped up to manage the Twins.

=== San Francisco Giants ===
On November 4, 2025, Tingler was selected by new San Francisco Giants manager Tony Vitello to be his bench coach. They were college teammates at Missouri.

== Managerial record ==
As of May 9, 2022

Team	Year	Regular season					Postseason			
Team	Year	Games	Won	Lost	Win %	Finish	Won	Lost	Win %	Result
SD	2020	60	37	23	.617	2nd in NL West	2	4	.333	Lost NLDS (LAD)
SD	2021	162	79	83	.488	3rd in NL West			–	
SD total		222	116	106	.523		2	4	.333	
MIN	2022	4	3	1	.750	(acting)				
MIN total		4	3	1	.750					
Total		226	119	107	.526		2	4	.333	

== Personal life ==
Tingler's wife, Callie, also graduated from Smithville High School. They have two sons, and live in Smithville. Both of Tingler's parents are coaches.

Tingler graduated from the University of Missouri with a communications degree.

He speaks English and Spanish.

== See also ==
- Rule 5 draft results
