= 2020 National League Division Series =

American baseball games

Teams
| Team (Wins) | | Manager | Season |
| Los Angeles Dodgers (3) | | Dave Roberts | 43–17 (.717), GA: 6 |
| San Diego Padres (0) | | Jayce Tingler | 37–23 (.617), GB: 6 |
- Dates: October 6–8
- Television: FS1 (Games 1–2); MLB Network (Game 3)
- TV announcers: Joe Davis, John Smoltz, and Ken Rosenthal (FS1); Matt Vasgersian, John Smoltz, and Jon Paul Morosi (MLBN)
- Radio: ESPN
- Radio announcers: Jon Sciambi and Kyle Peterson
- Umpires: Lance Barrett, Doug Eddings, Ángel Hernández, Alfonso Márquez, Bill Miller (crew chief), Quinn Wolcott

Teams
| Team (Wins) | | Manager | Season |
| Atlanta Braves (3) | | Brian Snitker | 35–25 (.583), GA: 4 |
| Miami Marlins (0) | | Don Mattingly | 31–29 (.517), GB: 4 |
- Dates: October 6–8
- Television: FS1 (Games 1, 3); MLB Network (Game 2)
- TV announcers: Adam Amin, A. J. Pierzynski, Adam Wainwright, and Tom Verducci (FS1); Matt Vasgersian, Jim Kaat, Buck Showalter, and Tom Verducci (MLBN)
- Radio: ESPN
- Radio announcers: Karl Ravech and Tim Kurkjian
- Umpires: Dan Bellino, Andy Fletcher, Chris Guccione, Stu Scheurwater, Mark Wegner (crew chief), Bill Welke
- NLWC: Los Angeles Dodgers over Milwaukee Brewers (2–0); Atlanta Braves over Cincinnati Reds (2–0); San Diego Padres over St. Louis Cardinals (2–1); Miami Marlins over Chicago Cubs (2–0)

The 2020 National League Division Series were two best-of-five playoff series on the National League side in Major League Baseball’s 2020 postseason to determine the participating teams in the 2020 National League Championship Series. These matchups were:

- (1) Los Angeles Dodgers (NL West champions) vs. (4) San Diego Padres (NL West 2nd place): Dodgers won the series, 3–0.
- (2) Atlanta Braves (NL East champions) vs. (6) Miami Marlins (NL East 2nd place): Braves won the series, 3–0.

Due to the COVID-19 pandemic, all games for each of the two series were held at two neutral sites at Globe Life Field in Arlington, Texas and at Minute Maid Park in Houston, Texas. The games were televised nationally by FS1 and MLB Network.

Both series ended in a sweep for the first time in the NL since 2007, as the Dodgers and Braves advanced to the NLCS.

The Dodgers went on to defeat the Braves in the NLCS, then won the 2020 World Series over the American League champion Tampa Bay Rays. This was the Dodgers' first World Series title since 1988.

== Background ==
Due to the COVID-19 pandemic, the MLB season was reduced to 60 games. As part of a special postseason format, playoff berths were made available for eight teams in each league: three division winners, three division runners-up, and two wild card teams. With no first round byes for division winners, all teams were required to play in a Wild Card Series.

Between the two leagues, Central division teams claimed three of the four wild card berths and thus made up seven of the sixteen teams in the Wild Card. However, all seven Central division teams lost their Wild Card series, thus leaving the Division series in both leagues to be contested exclusively by teams from Eastern and Western divisions.

The Dodgers entered the NLDS as the top seed, having completed the regular season at 43–17 (.717) and winning the NL West. The Braves won the NL East, going 35–25 (.583). The two second place teams in their respective divisions, the Marlins and the Padres, also made the NLDS. Since 2012, when MLB removed the stipulation that two teams could not play each other in the NLDS if they were in the same division, there had been six occasions when an NLDS had at least one series with two division opponents. This was the seventh time that this occurred, and also the first time since the strike-affected 1981 National League Division Series (where division opponents were assured of facing each other on a one-time basis) that both NLDS match-ups consisted of division opponents facing each other.

As part of the terms set for postseason, all games starting with the division series would be played at neutral sites. The Dodgers and Padres played at Globe Life Field, while the Braves and Marlins played at Minute Maid Park.

The higher seed served as the "home team" (i.e., batted second each inning) for Games 1, 2, and 5, while the lower seed as the "home team" for Games 3 and 4, mirroring the 2–2–1 format typically used in the Division Series.

== Matchups ==
=== Los Angeles Dodgers vs. San Diego Padres ===
Los Angeles won the series, 3–0.

| Game | Date | Score | Location | Time | Attendance |
|---|---|---|---|---|---|
| 1 | October 6 | San Diego Padres – 1, Los Angeles Dodgers – 5 | Globe Life Field | 3:54 | N/A |
| 2 | October 7 | San Diego Padres – 5, Los Angeles Dodgers – 6 | Globe Life Field | 3:18 | N/A |
| 3 | October 8 | Los Angeles Dodgers – 12, San Diego Padres – 3 | Globe Life Field | 4:04 | N/A |

=== Atlanta Braves vs. Miami Marlins ===
Atlanta won the series, 3–0.

| Game | Date | Score | Location | Time | Attendance |
|---|---|---|---|---|---|
| 1 | October 6 | Miami Marlins – 5, Atlanta Braves – 9 | Minute Maid Park | 3:15 | N/A |
| 2 | October 7 | Miami Marlins – 0, Atlanta Braves – 2 | Minute Maid Park | 2:51 | N/A |
| 3 | October 8 | Atlanta Braves – 7, Miami Marlins – 0 | Minute Maid Park | 3:29 | N/A |

== Los Angeles vs. San Diego ==
This was the first postseason match-up between the Dodgers and Padres. The Dodgers won six of ten games against the Padres during the 60-game regular season. This was the first postseason series to feature two California teams since the 2002 World Series and first ever with teams from Southern California.

=== Game 1 ===
October 6, 2020 8:38 pm (CDT) at Globe Life Field in Arlington, Texas
| Team | 1 | 2 | 3 | 4 | 5 | 6 | 7 | 8 | 9 | R | H | E |
|---|---|---|---|---|---|---|---|---|---|---|---|---|
| San Diego | 0 | 0 | 0 | 1 | 0 | 0 | 0 | 0 | 0 | 1 | 3 | 1 |
| Los Angeles | 0 | 0 | 0 | 0 | 1 | 4 | 0 | 0 | X | 5 | 4 | 0 |
WP: Dustin May (1–0) LP: Garrett Richards (0–1); Attendance: N/A; Boxscore

Mike Clevinger returned to the mound for the Padres but was pulled after one inning after a noticeable drop in velocity. The game remained scoreless until the fourth inning, when the Padres scored on a two-out hit from Austin Nola. San Diego enjoyed their lead briefly – until the Dodgers scored on an error in the fifth. Then a game that had been well-pitched to that point boiled over in the sixth, when the Dodgers put up four runs to win by a 5–1 score. Just like Game 3 of their wild card win over the Cardinals, the Padres used nine pitchers and walked ten batters, along the way.

=== Game 2 ===
October 7, 2020 8:08 pm (CDT) at Globe Life Field in Arlington, Texas
| Team | 1 | 2 | 3 | 4 | 5 | 6 | 7 | 8 | 9 | R | H | E |
|---|---|---|---|---|---|---|---|---|---|---|---|---|
| San Diego | 0 | 1 | 0 | 0 | 0 | 2 | 0 | 0 | 2 | 5 | 9 | 0 |
| Los Angeles | 0 | 0 | 3 | 1 | 0 | 0 | 2 | 0 | X | 6 | 11 | 0 |
WP: Clayton Kershaw (1–0) LP: Zach Davies (0–1) Sv: Joe Kelly (1); Home runs: SD: Manny Machado (1), Eric Hosmer (1); LAD: Cody Bellinger (1); Attendance: N/A; Boxscore

Before the game, the Padres removed injured starter Mike Clevinger from the roster and replaced him with Dan Altavilla. The Padres took an early lead in the second inning when Wil Myers hit a double to center field that scored Tommy Pham. The Dodgers took the lead for good in the third inning on a two-run double by Corey Seager and a single by Max Muncy, and padded their lead the next inning on a Cody Bellinger home run. The Padres began the sixth inning with back-to-back home runs by Manny Machado and Eric Hosmer that reduced their deficit to one, but Dodgers starter Clayton Kershaw retired the next three batters to end the inning. The Padres threatened again in the seventh inning, when Bellinger made a spectacular catch over the center-field wall that would otherwise have been a go-ahead two-run home run by Fernando Tatís Jr. The Dodgers padded their lead in the bottom half of the seventh on a Justin Turner sacrifice fly and a single by Muncy. The Padres threatened in the top of the ninth inning, scoring two runs on hits by Mitch Moreland and Trent Grisham off Dodgers closer Kenley Jansen and once again reducing their deficit to a single run. Joe Kelly replaced Jansen with Grisham on first base and two outs, and walked Tatís and Machado to load the bases before getting Hosmer to ground out to end the game.

=== Game 3 ===
October 8, 2020 8:08 pm (CDT) at Globe Life Field in Arlington, Texas
| Team | 1 | 2 | 3 | 4 | 5 | 6 | 7 | 8 | 9 | R | H | E |
|---|---|---|---|---|---|---|---|---|---|---|---|---|
| Los Angeles | 0 | 1 | 5 | 1 | 1 | 0 | 0 | 0 | 4 | 12 | 14 | 1 |
| San Diego | 0 | 2 | 0 | 0 | 0 | 1 | 0 | 0 | 0 | 3 | 6 | 2 |
WP: Julio Urías (1–0) LP: Adrián Morejón (0–1); Attendance: N/A; Boxscore

The Dodgers took an early lead in the second inning that was quickly erased when the Padres scored two runs in the bottom half of the inning. The Padres' lead was also short-lived, as the Dodgers scored five runs in the third inning en route to a blowout win. Though he did not start the game, erstwhile Dodgers starter Julio Urías pitched five innings in relief, allowing one run on one hit, striking out six Padres, and getting credited as the winning pitcher. The Padres, meanwhile, used 11 pitchers – a postseason record for a nine-inning game. The Dodgers advanced to their fourth NLCS in five seasons.

The Dodgers' Will Smith had five hits in the game, becoming the first catcher, the first player in Dodgers franchise history, and the ninth major league player ever to accomplish the feat in a postseason game.

The Dodgers would go on to win the World Series a few weeks later, making them the first World Series winner to sweep the Division Series since the Wild Card Game/Round was introduced in 2012.

=== Composite line score ===
2020 NLDS (3–0): Los Angeles Dodgers beat San Diego Padres

| Team | 1 | 2 | 3 | 4 | 5 | 6 | 7 | 8 | 9 | R | H | E |
|---|---|---|---|---|---|---|---|---|---|---|---|---|
| San Diego Padres | 0 | 3 | 0 | 1 | 0 | 3 | 0 | 0 | 2 | 9 | 18 | 3 |
| Los Angeles Dodgers | 0 | 1 | 8 | 2 | 2 | 4 | 2 | 0 | 4 | 23 | 29 | 1 |
Total attendance: N/A Average attendance: N/A

== Atlanta vs. Miami ==
This was the second postseason match-up between the Braves and the Marlins. Their previous postseason meeting was in the 1997 National League Championship Series, which the Marlins won in six games. The Braves won the season series 6–4 in ten meetings during the 60–game regular season.

=== Game 1 ===
October 6, 2020 1:08 pm (CDT) at Minute Maid Park in Houston, Texas
| Team | 1 | 2 | 3 | 4 | 5 | 6 | 7 | 8 | 9 | R | H | E |
|---|---|---|---|---|---|---|---|---|---|---|---|---|
| Miami | 0 | 1 | 3 | 0 | 0 | 0 | 0 | 1 | 0 | 5 | 9 | 0 |
| Atlanta | 1 | 0 | 2 | 0 | 0 | 0 | 6 | 0 | X | 9 | 12 | 1 |
WP: Will Smith (1–0) LP: Sandy Alcántara (0–1); Home runs: MIA: Miguel Rojas (1); ATL: Ronald Acuña Jr. (1), Travis d'Arnaud (1), Dansby Swanson (1); Attendance: N/A; Boxscore

Ronald Acuña Jr. led off the Braves’ day with an opposite field home run (facing Sandy Alcántara), setting the tone for his club. The Marlins would take the lead in the third off of a Garrett Cooper double that plated two runs and a Brian Anderson single that scored Cooper. After a pair of runs in the third to draw within one run, the Braves would break the game open in the seventh against a fatigued Alcántara, Yimi García, and James Hoyt, via a Travis d'Arnaud three-run home run. The Braves’ six-run seventh also featured a two-run shot from Dansby Swanson.

Things turned testy in the third when Acuña was hit by a 98-mph fastball. The showy All-Star outfielder held onto his bat and walked a few steps toward the mound before umpires and Braves coaches surrounded him and directed him away from Alcántara, who had started to walk toward him. After the game, Alcántara said about the incident: "If he’s ready to fight, I’m ready to fight."

=== Game 2 ===
October 7, 2020 1:08 pm (CDT) at Minute Maid Park in Houston, Texas
| Team | 1 | 2 | 3 | 4 | 5 | 6 | 7 | 8 | 9 | R | H | E |
|---|---|---|---|---|---|---|---|---|---|---|---|---|
| Miami | 0 | 0 | 0 | 0 | 0 | 0 | 0 | 0 | 0 | 0 | 3 | 1 |
| Atlanta | 0 | 1 | 0 | 1 | 0 | 0 | 0 | 0 | X | 2 | 4 | 1 |
WP: Ian Anderson (1–0) LP: Pablo López (0–1) Sv: Mark Melancon (1); Home runs: MIA: None; ATL: Dansby Swanson (2), Travis d'Arnaud (2); Attendance: N/A; Boxscore

Rookie Ian Anderson turned in a scoreless start, lasting 5 2/3 innings and striking out eight. The Braves bullpen did not allow a hit after that to secure the win. Just as in Game 1, Travis d'Arnaud and Dansby Swanson both homered. Both were solo shots and the only runs in the game.

The Braves became the third team in MLB history to toss shutouts in three of their first four games to begin a postseason. The other two teams were the 1905 New York Giants and 1966 Baltimore Orioles.

=== Game 3 ===
October 8, 2020 1:08 pm (CDT) at Minute Maid Park in Houston, Texas
| Team | 1 | 2 | 3 | 4 | 5 | 6 | 7 | 8 | 9 | R | H | E |
|---|---|---|---|---|---|---|---|---|---|---|---|---|
| Atlanta | 0 | 0 | 4 | 1 | 2 | 0 | 0 | 0 | 0 | 7 | 10 | 0 |
| Miami | 0 | 0 | 0 | 0 | 0 | 0 | 0 | 0 | 0 | 0 | 5 | 1 |
WP: Kyle Wright (1–0) LP: Sixto Sánchez (0–1); Attendance: N/A; Boxscore

Kyle Wright pitched six scoreless innings and was backed up by two RBIs from both Travis d'Arnaud and Dansby Swanson. The Braves became the first team in MLB history to have two back-to-back shutouts in the same postseason.

This was the first NLDS victory for the Atlanta Braves since 2001 and the first postseason series loss for the Miami Marlins since the franchise came into existence in 1993.

=== Composite line score ===
2020 NLDS (3–0): Atlanta Braves beat Miami Marlins

| Team | 1 | 2 | 3 | 4 | 5 | 6 | 7 | 8 | 9 | R | H | E |
|---|---|---|---|---|---|---|---|---|---|---|---|---|
| Miami Marlins | 0 | 1 | 3 | 0 | 0 | 0 | 0 | 1 | 0 | 5 | 17 | 2 |
| Atlanta Braves | 1 | 1 | 6 | 2 | 2 | 0 | 6 | 0 | 0 | 18 | 26 | 2 |
Total attendance: N/A Average attendance: N/A

== See also ==
- 2020 American League Division Series
- Dodgers–Padres rivalry
