= 2024 San Diego Padres season =

2024 San Diego Padres
- National League Wild Card winners
- League: National League
- Division: West
- Ballpark: Petco Park
- City: San Diego, California
- Record: 93–69 (.574)
- Divisional place: 2nd
- Owners: Seidler Equity Partners
- General managers: A. J. Preller
- Managers: Mike Shildt
- Television: MLB.tv
- Radio: KWFN · KBZT

The 2024 San Diego Padres season was the 56th season of the San Diego Padres franchise. The Padres compete in Major League Baseball (MLB) as a member club of the National League (NL) West Division. The team plays its home games at Petco Park.

With a win over the San Francisco Giants on September 13, the Padres improved on their 82–80 record from the previous season. After a win over the Chicago White Sox on September 22, the Padres achieved their first 90-win season since 2010.

On September 24, the Padres secured a wild card spot in the postseason with a 4–2 win over the Los Angeles Dodgers behind a game-winning triple play. The 5-4-3 triple play marked a number of historical feats: the ninth overall in franchise history, the third to end a game in the last 30 years, the first by the Padres since June 10, 2010 against the New York Mets, and the first ever in MLB history to clinch a postseason berth by way of a game-winning triple play. Additionally, they returned to the postseason for the third time in the past five seasons. They swept the Atlanta Braves in the National League Wild Card Series, but lost the National League Division Series in five games to their division rival and eventual World Series champion Los Angeles Dodgers.

Despite the NLDS loss, in their Game 2 blowout victory, the Padres' 6 home runs set a franchise record for the most home runs in a single postseason game. They were also the first team to hit 6 home runs in a single postseason game on the road, the most in Major League Baseball history.

== Offseason ==
=== Acquisitions ===
Position	Player	2023 Team
UTL	Tyler Wade	Oakland Athletics
RP	Jeremiah Estrada	Chicago Cubs
RP	Logan Gillaspie	Boston Red Sox
RP	Stephen Kolek	Seattle Mariners
OF	Bryce Johnson	San Francisco Giants
RP	Luis Patiño	Chicago White Sox
RP	Yuki Matsui	Tohoku Rakuten Golden Eagles (NPB)
RP	Woo-suk Go	LG Twins (KBO)
RP	Wandy Peralta	New York Yankees

=== Departures ===
Position	Player	2024 Team
RP	Josh Hader	Houston Astros
SP	Rich Hill	Boston Red Sox
RP	Luis García	Los Angeles Angels
RP	Drew Pomeranz	Los Angeles Dodgers
SP	Blake Snell	San Francisco Giants
C	Gary Sánchez	Milwaukee Brewers
1B	Ji-man Choi	New York Mets
1B	Garrett Cooper	Chicago Cubs
SP	Seth Lugo	Kansas City Royals
SP	Michael Wacha	Kansas City Royals
SP	Nick Martinez	Cincinnati Reds
RP	Tim Hill	Chicago White Sox
OF	Taylor Kohlwey	New York Mets
C	Austin Nola	Kansas City Royals

=== Trades ===
November 17, 2023	Traded RHP Scott Barlow to the Cleveland Guardians for RHP Enyel De Los Santos.
December 7, 2023	Traded LF Juan Soto and CF Trent Grisham to the New York Yankees for RHP Michael King, C Kyle Higashioka, RHP Randy Vásquez, RHP Jhony Brito, and RHP Drew Thorpe
December 15, 2023	Traded DH Matt Carpenter, LHP Ray Kerr and cash to the Atlanta Braves for CF Drew Campbell.
March 3, 2024	Traded RHP Drew Thorpe, RHP Jairo Iriarte, OF Samuel Zavala, and RHP Steven Wilson to the Chicago White Sox for RHP Dylan Cease.

== Regular season ==
As part of MLB World Tour, the Padres opened their regular season with two games against the Los Angeles Dodgers at Gocheok Sky Dome in Seoul, South Korea.

=== Game log ===
2024 Game Log: 93–69 (Home: 45–36; Away: 48–33)
March/April: 15–18 (Home: 7–12; Away: 8–6)

#	Date	Opponent	Score	Win	Loss	Save	Attendance	Record	Streak
1	March 20	Dodgers*	2–5	Hudson (1–0)	**Brito** (0–1)	Phillips (1)	15,952	0–1	L1
2	March 21	@ Dodgers*	15–11	**King** (1–0)	Yamamoto (0–1)	**Suárez** (1)	15,928	1–1	W1
3	March 28	Giants	6–4	**Matsui** (1–0)	Jackson (0–1)	**Suárez** (2)	44,953	2–1	W2
4	March 29	Giants	3–8	Harrison (1–0)	**Musgrove** (0–1)	—	45,427	2–2	L1
5	March 30	Giants	6–9	Hicks (1–0)	**Cease** (0–1)	—	37,104	2–3	L2
6	March 31	Giants	13–4	**Ávila** (1–0)	Jefferies (0–1)	—	34,499	3–3	W1
7	April 1	Cardinals	2–6	Gibson (1–0)	**Waldron** (0–1)	—	37,566	3–4	L1
8	April 2	Cardinals	2–5	Mikolas (1–1)	**Darvish** (0–1)	Helsley (1)	43,076	3–5	L2
9	April 3	Cardinals	3–2	**Musgrove** (1–1)	Thompson (0–2)	**Suárez** (3)	38,835	4–5	W1
10	April 5	@ Giants	2–3	Doval (1–0)	**De Los Santos** (0–1)	—	40,645	4–6	L1
11	April 6	@ Giants	4–0	**King** (2–0)	Winn (0–2)	—	40,114	5–6	W1
12	April 7	@ Giants	2–3	Walker (1–0)	**Brito** (0–2)	Doval (1)	40,149	5–7	L1
13	April 8	Cubs	9–8	**Peralta** (1–0)	Alzolay (1–1)	**Suárez** (4)	33,864	6–7	W1
14	April 9	Cubs	1–5	Smyly (2–1)	**Musgrove** (1–2)	—	35,171	6–8	L1
15	April 10	Cubs	10–2	**Cease** (1–1)	Hendricks (0–2)	—	39,048	7–8	W1
16	April 12	@ Dodgers	8–7 (11)	**Suárez** (1–0)	Vesia (0–2)	—	49,606	8–8	W2
17	April 13	@ Dodgers	2–5	Stone (1–1)	**Cosgrove** (0–1)	Phillips (5)	44,582	8–9	L1
18	April 14	@ Dodgers	6–3	**Matsui** (2–0)	Feyereisen (0–1)	**Suárez** (5)	49,432	9–9	W1
19	April 15	@ Brewers	7–3	**Musgrove** (2–2)	Ross (1–1)	**Suárez** (6)	18,396	10–9	W2
20	April 16	@ Brewers	6–3	**Cease** (2–1)	Miley (0–1)	—	20,034	11–9	W3
21	April 17	@ Brewers	0–1	Uribe (2–1)	**King** (2–1)	Payamps (2)	24,521	11–10	L1
22	April 19	Blue Jays	1–5	Francis (2–2)	**Waldron** (0–2)	—	44,890	11–11	L2
23	April 20	Blue Jays	2–5	Berríos (4–0)	**Vásquez** (0–1)	Romano (2)	43,273	11–12	L3
24	April 21	Blue Jays	6–3	**Musgrove** (3–2)	Bassitt (2–3)	**Suárez** (7)	44,527	12–12	W1
25	April 22	@ Rockies	3–1	**Cease** (3–1)	Mears (0–2)	**Suárez** (8)	18,515	13–12	W2
26	April 23	@ Rockies	4–7	Beeks (2–1)	**King** (2–2)	Lawrence (1)	18,822	13–13	L1
27	April 24	@ Rockies	5–2	**Waldron** (1–2)	Blach (0–1)	**Suárez** (9)	19,356	14–13	W1
28	April 25	@ Rockies	9–10	Kinley (1–0)	**Peralta** (1–1)	Lawrence (2)	27,705	14–14	L1
29	April 26	Phillies	3–9	Nola (4–1)	**Musgrove** (3–3)	—	40,763	14–15	L2
30	April 27	Phillies	1–5	Suárez (5–0)	**Cease** (3–2)	—	43,018	14–16	L3
31	April 28	Phillies	6–8	Walker (1–0)	**King** (2–3)	Alvarado (5)	42,037	14–17	L4
32	April 29	Reds	2–5	Lodolo (3–0)	**Waldron** (1–3)	—	39,158	14–18	L5
33	April 30	Reds	6–4	**Darvish** (1–1)	Martinez (0–2)	**Suárez** (10)	36,769	15–18	W1
*March 20 and 21 games played at Gocheok Sky Dome in Seoul, South Korea

May: 16–11 (Home: 6–7; Away: 10–4)

#	Date	Opponent	Score	Win	Loss	Save	Attendance	Record	Streak
34	May 1	Reds	6–2	**De Los Santos** (1–1)	Cruz (1–2)	—	32,993	16–18	W2
35	May 3	@ Diamondbacks	7–1	**Cease** (4–2)	Cecconi (1–2)	—	31,976	17–18	W3
36	May 4	@ Diamondbacks	13–1	**King** (3–3)	Pfaadt (1–2)	—	39,661	18–18	W4
37	May 5	@ Diamondbacks	4–11	Nelson (2–2)	**Waldron** (1–4)	—	30,968	18–19	L1
38	May 6	@ Cubs	6–3	**Darvish** (2–1)	Lovelady (0–1)	**Suárez** (11)	35,560	19–19	W1
39	May 7	@ Cubs	2–3	Neris (2–0)	**De Los Santos** (1–2)	—	38,133	19–20	L1
40	May 8	@ Cubs	3–0	**Cease** (5–2)	Wesneski (2–1)	**Suárez** (12)	30,138	20–20	W1
41	May 10	Dodgers	2–1	**Suárez** (2–0)	Grove (1–2)	—	43,388	21–20	W2
42	May 11	Dodgers	0–5	Paxton (5–0)	**Waldron** (1–5)	—	46,701	21–21	L1
43	May 12	Dodgers	4–0	**Darvish** (3–1)	Buehler (0–1)	—	43,881	22–21	W1
44	May 13	Rockies	4–5	Hudson (1–6)	**Vásquez** (0–2)	Beeks (4)	34,458	22–22	L1
45	May 14	Rockies	3–6	Quantrill (3–3)	**Cease** (5–3)	Kinley (1)	40,134	22–23	L2
46	May 15	Rockies	0–8	Gomber (1–2)	**King** (3–4)	—	33,958	22–24	L3
47	May 17	@ Braves	3–1	**Waldron** (2–5)	Fried (3–2)	**Estrada** (1)	40,186	23–24	W1
—	May 18	@ Braves	Postponed (rain); Makeup: May 20						
48	May 19	@ Braves	9–1	**Darvish** (4–1)	Elder (1–2)	—	39,203	24–24	W2
49	May 20 (1)	@ Braves	6–5	**Brito** (1–2)	Jiménez (1–1)	**Suárez** (13)	35,113	25–24	W3
50	May 20 (2)	@ Braves	0–3	Sale (7–1)	**Vásquez** (0–3)	Iglesias (11)	34,753	25–25	L1
51	May 21	@ Reds	0–2	Abbott (3–4)	**Musgrove** (3–4)	Díaz (8)	18,996	25–26	L2
52	May 22	@ Reds	7–3	**King** (4–4)	Martinez (1–3)	—	14,255	26–26	W1
53	May 23	@ Reds	6–4 (10)	**Estrada** (1–0)	Moll (0–1)	**Suárez** (14)	16,479	27–26	W2
54	May 24	Yankees	0–8	Rodón (6–2)	**Darvish** (4–2)	—	43,505	27–27	L1
55	May 25	Yankees	1–4	Stroman (4–2)	**Cease** (5–4)	Holmes (15)	44,845	27–28	L2
56	May 26	Yankees	5–2	**Estrada** (2–0)	Schmidt (5–3)	**Suárez** (15)	45,731	28–28	W1
57	May 27	Marlins	2–1	**Morejón** (1–0)	Puk (0–6)	**Suárez** (16)	38,745	29–28	W2
58	May 28	Marlins	4–0	**Waldron** (3–5)	Luzardo (2–4)	—	41,032	30–28	W3
59	May 29	Marlins	1–9	Garrett (2–0)	**Darvish** (4–3)	—	32,227	30–29	L1
60	May 31	@ Royals	11–8	**Matsui** (3–0)	Schreiber (3–1)	**Suárez** (17)	30,006	31–29	W1

June: 15–13 (Home: 11–3; Away: 4–10)

#	Date	Opponent	Score	Win	Loss	Save	Attendance	Record	Streak
61	June 1	@ Royals	7–3	**Vásquez** (1–3)	Marsh (4–3)	—	25,266	32–29	W2
62	June 2	@ Royals	3–4	Klein (1–0)	**Matsui** (3–1)	—	21,825	32–30	L1
63	June 3	@ Angels	1–2	Strickland (2–1)	**Morejón** (1–1)	Estévez (9)	32,683	32–31	L2
64	June 4	@ Angels	2–4	Moore (2–2)	**Matsui** (3–2)	Estévez (10)	33,947	32–32	L3
65	June 5	@ Angels	2–3	Soriano (3–5)	**Cease** (5–5)	Moore (1)	31,960	32–33	L4
66	June 6	Diamondbacks	3–4	Ginkel (5–1)	**Estrada** (2–1)	Sewald (7)	39,963	32–34	L5
67	June 7	Diamondbacks	10–3	**King** (5–4)	Pfaadt (2–5)	—	40,341	33–34	W1
68	June 8	Diamondbacks	13–1	**Waldron** (4–5)	Nelson (3–5)	—	42,636	34–34	W2
69	June 9	Diamondbacks	3–9	Henry (2–2)	**Mazur** (0–1)	—	41,979	34–35	L1
70	June 10	Athletics	6–1	**Cease** (6–5)	Estes (2–2)	—	38,822	35–35	W1
71	June 11	Athletics	4–3	**Suárez** (3–0)	Alexander (0–1)	—	41,945	36–35	W2
72	June 12	Athletics	5–4	**Suárez** (4–0)	Miller (1–1)	—	35,688	37–35	W3
73	June 14	@ Mets	1–2	Manaea (4–3)	**Waldron** (4–6)	Díaz (6)	22,850	37–36	L1
74	June 15	@ Mets	1–5	Quintana (2–5)	**Mazur** (0–2)	—	37,031	37–37	L2
75	June 16	@ Mets	6–11	Megill (2–3)	**Cease** (6–6)	—	31,054	37–38	L3
76	June 17	@ Phillies	2–9	Sánchez (4–3)	**Vásquez** (1–4)	—	43,134	37–39	L4
77	June 18	@ Phillies	3–4	Hoffman (3–0)	**Suárez** (4–1)	—	43,021	37–40	L5
78	June 19	@ Phillies	5–2	**Waldron** (5–6)	Kerkering (2–1)	**Suárez** (18)	44,445	38–40	W1
79	June 20	Brewers	7–6	**Estrada** (3–1)	Payamps (1–3)	—	42,644	39–40	W2
80	June 21	Brewers	9–5	**Kolek** (1–0)	Milner (3–1)	**De Los Santos** (1)	41,282	40–40	W3
81	June 22	Brewers	6–4	**Vásquez** (2–4)	Rodríguez (0–3)	**Suárez** (19)	39,658	41–40	W4
82	June 23	Brewers	2–6	Myers (5–2)	**King** (5–5)	—	42,048	41–41	L1
83	June 24	Nationals	7–6 (10)	**Peralta** (2–1)	Harvey (2–3)	—	39,164	42–41	W1
84	June 25	Nationals	9–7	**Mazur** (1–2)	Gore (6–7)	**Suárez** (20)	40,825	43–41	W2
85	June 26	Nationals	8–5	**Cease** (7–6)	Herz (1–2)	—	37,397	44–41	W3
86	June 28	@ Red Sox	9–2	**Kolek** (2–0)	Pivetta (4–5)	—	33,540	45–41	W4
87	June 29	@ Red Sox	11–1	**King** (6–5)	Houck (7–6)	—	33,003	46–41	W5
88	June 30	@ Red Sox	1–4	Winckowski (2–0)	**Waldron** (5–7)	Jansen (16)	30,665	46–42	L1

July: 13–9 (Home: 4–6; Away: 9–3)

#	Date	Opponent	Score	Win	Loss	Save	Attendance	Record	Streak
89	July 2	@ Rangers	0–7	Eovaldi (5–3)	**Cease** (7–7)	—	33,965	46–43	L2
90	July 3	@ Rangers	6–4	**Morejón** (2–1)	Dunning (4–7)	**Suárez** (21)	37,859	47–43	W1
91	July 4	@ Rangers	3–1	**King** (7–5)	Scherzer (1–2)	**Suárez** (22)	38,607	48–43	W2
92	July 5	Diamondbacks	10–8	**Kolek** (3–0)	Sewald (0–2)	—	47,171	49–43	W3
93	July 6	Diamondbacks	5–7 (10)	Thompson (4–3)	**Peralta** (2–2)	Castellanos (1)	44,761	49–44	L1
94	July 7	Diamondbacks	1–9	Nelson (6–6)	**Cease** (7–8)	—	41,112	49–45	L2
95	July 9	Mariners	3–8	Gilbert (6–5)	**Mazur** (1–3)	—	43,123	49–46	L3
96	July 10	Mariners	0–2	Miller (7–7)	**King** (7–6)	Muñoz (15)	39,611	49–47	L4
97	July 12	Braves	1–6	Schwellenbach (3–4)	**Waldron** (5–8)	—	44,390	49–48	L5
98	July 13	Braves	4–0	**Cease** (8–8)	López (7–3)	—	43,097	50–48	W1
99	July 14	Braves	3–6	Sale (13–3)	**Vásquez** (2–5)	Iglesias (22)	42,132	50–49	L1
**94th All-Star Game: Arlington, TX**
100	July 19	@ Guardians	0–7	Bibee (8–4)	**Waldron** (5–9)	—	37,242	50–50	L2
101	July 20	@ Guardians	7–0	**Cease** (9–8)	Williams (0–2)	—	37,485	51–50	W1
102	July 21	@ Guardians	2–1	**King** (8–6)	Lively (8–6)	**Suárez** (23)	30,491	52–50	W2
103	July 23	@ Nationals	4–0	**Vásquez** (3–5)	Herz (1–4)	—	20,749	53–50	W3
104	July 24	@ Nationals	12–3	**Waldron** (6–9)	Parker (5–6)	—	23,323	54–50	W4
105	July 25	@ Nationals	3–0	**Cease** (10–8)	Corbin (2–10)	—	20,755	55–50	W5
106	July 26	@ Orioles	6–4	**Suárez** (5–1)	Kimbrel (6–3)	—	43,692	56–50	W6
107	July 27	@ Orioles	9–4	**King** (9–6)	Kremer (4–7)	—	30,008	57–50	W7
108	July 28	@ Orioles	6–8	Pérez (2–0)	**Vásquez** (3–6)	Canó (4)	38,411	57–51	L1
109	July 30	Dodgers	6–5 (10)	**Suárez** (6–1)	Vesia (1–3)	—	47,559	58–51	W1
110	July 31	Dodgers	8–1	**Cease** (11–8)	Kershaw (0–1)	—	46,997	59–51	W2

August: 18–10 (Home: 9–4; Away: 9–6)

#	Date	Opponent	Score	Win	Loss	Save	Attendance	Record	Streak
111	August 2	Rockies	2–5	Gomber (3–7)	**Estrada** (3–2)	Vodnik (5)	44,393	59–52	L1
112	August 3	Rockies	3–2	**Adam** (5–2)	Lambert (2–5)	**Suárez** (24)	44,029	60–52	W1
113	August 4	Rockies	10–2	**Waldron** (7–9)	Quantrill (7–8)	—	41,828	61–52	W2
114	August 6	@ Pirates	6–0	**Hoeing** (2–2)	Woodford (0–3)	—	17,814	62–52	W3
115	August 7	@ Pirates	9–8 (10)	**Scott** (7–5)	Holderman (3–5)	**Morejón** (1)	21,528	63–52	W4
116	August 8	@ Pirates	7–6	**Adam** (6–2)	Bednar (3–4)	**Suárez** (25)	19,952	64–52	W5
117	August 9	@ Marlins	6–2 (10)	**Adam** (7–2)	de Geus (0–1)	—	12,721	65–52	W6
118	August 10	@ Marlins	9–8 (10)	**Suárez** (7–1)	McMillon (0–1)	**Scott** (19)	20,223	66–52	W7
119	August 11	@ Marlins	6–7	Meyer (3–2)	**Cease** (11–9)	Soriano (1)	15,699	66–53	L1
120	August 12	Pirates	2–1	**Estrada** (4–2)	Woodford (0–4)	**Suárez** (26)	45,393	67–53	W1
121	August 13	Pirates	3–0	**King** (10–6)	Ortiz (5–3)	**Suárez** (27)	42,949	68–53	W2
122	August 14	Pirates	8–2	**Pérez** (3–5)	Keller (10–7)	—	39,770	69–53	W3
123	August 16	@ Rockies	3–7	Quantrill (8–8)	**Waldron** (7–10)	—	33,054	69–54	L1
124	August 17	@ Rockies	8–3	**Cease** (12–9)	Freeland (3–5)	—	47,483	70–54	W1
125	August 18	@ Rockies	2–3	Chivilli (1–1)	**Hoeing** (2–3)	Vodnik (9)	26,027	70–55	L1
126	August 19	Twins	5–3	**King** (11–6)	Matthews (1–1)	**Suárez** (28)	40,220	71–55	W1
127	August 20	Twins	7–5	**Scott** (8–5)	Okert (3–2)	**Suárez** (29)	39,143	72–55	W2
128	August 21	Twins	4–11	Woods Richardson (5–3)	**Waldron** (7–11)	—	36,589	72–56	L1
129	August 22	Mets	3–8	Severino (9–6)	**Cease** (12–10)	—	41,673	72–57	L2
130	August 23	Mets	7–0	**Musgrove** (4–4)	Blackburn (5–4)	—	40,556	73–57	W1
131	August 24	Mets	1–7	Peterson (8–1)	**King** (11–7)	—	40,284	73–58	L1
132	August 25	Mets	3–2	**Suárez** (8–1)	Díaz (5–2)	—	41,870	74–58	W1
133	August 26	@ Cardinals	7–4	**Vásquez** (4–6)	Gibson (7–6)	—	28,697	75–58	W2
134	August 27	@ Cardinals	7–5	**Matsui** (4–2)	King (3–3)	**Scott** (20)	27,224	76–58	W3
135	August 28	@ Cardinals	3–4	Helsley (6–4)	**Suárez** (8–2)	—	30,999	76–59	L1
136	August 29	@ Cardinals	1–4	Gray (12–9)	**King** (11–8)	Helsley (41)	26,553	76–60	L2
137	August 30	@ Rays	13–5	**Pérez** (4–5)	Bradley (6–9)	—	17,547	77–60	W1
138	August 31	@ Rays	4–11	Baz (2–2)	**Vásquez** (4–7)	—	16,600	77–61	L1

September: 16–8 (Home: 8–4; Away: 8–4)

#	Date	Opponent	Score	Win	Loss	Save	Attendance	Record	Streak
139	September 1	@ Rays	4–3	**Scott** (9–5)	Rodríguez (3–4)	**Suárez** (30)	17,494	78–61	W1
140	September 2	Tigers	3–0	**Musgrove** (5–4)	Hanifee (0–1)	**Suárez** (31)	44,957	79–61	W2
141	September 4	Tigers	6–5 (10)	**Estrada** (5–2)	Foley (3–5)	—	41,669	80–61	W3
142	September 5	Tigers	3–4	Vanasco (1–0)	**Suárez** (8–3)	Holton (7)	40,221	80–62	L1
143	September 6	Giants	5–1	**King** (12–8)	Black (0–3)	—	42,595	81–62	W1
144	September 7	Giants	3–6	Webb (12–9)	**Cease** (12–11)	Walker (6)	43,318	81–63	L1
145	September 8	Giants	6–7	Miller (4–5)	**Musgrove** (5–5)	Walker (7)	42,996	81–64	L2
146	September 10	@ Mariners	7–3	**Darvish** (5–3)	Kirby (11–11)	**Suárez** (32)	25,012	82–64	W1
147	September 11	@ Mariners	2–5	Woo (8–2)	**King** (12–9)	Muñoz (20)	21,129	82–65	L1
148	September 13	@ Giants	5–0	**Cease** (13–11)	Webb (12–10)	—	39,798	83–65	W1
149	September 14	@ Giants	8–0	**Musgrove** (6–5)	Black (0–4)	—	31,243	84–65	W2
150	September 15	@ Giants	4–3 (10)	**Suárez** (9–3)	Doval (5–3)	**Morejón** (2)	33,043	85–65	W3
151	September 16	Astros	3–1	**Darvish** (6–3)	Arrighetti (7–13)	**Suárez** (33)	44,443	86–65	W4
152	September 17	Astros	3–4 (10)	Hader (8–7)	**Morejón** (2–2)	Neris (18)	44,553	86–66	L1
153	September 18	Astros	4–0	**Cease** (14–11)	Valdez (14–7)	**Scott** (21)	42,883	87–66	W1
154	September 20	White Sox	3–2 (10)	**Morejón** (3–2)	Anderson (1–2)	—	45,790	88–66	W2
155	September 21	White Sox	6–2	**Pérez** (5–5)	Flexen (2–15)	**Scott** (22)	45,360	89–66	W3
156	September 22	White Sox	4–2	**Estrada** (6–2)	Ellard (2–3)	**Suárez** (34)	45,197	90–66	W4
157	September 24	@ Dodgers	4–2	**King** (13–9)	Knack (3–5)	**Suárez** (35)	50,369	91–66	W5
158	September 25	@ Dodgers	3–4	Vesia (5–4)	**Estrada** (6–3)	Kopech (15)	52,310	91–67	L1
159	September 26	@ Dodgers	2–7	Banda (3–2)	**Scott** (9–6)	—	52,433	91–68	L2
160	September 27	@ Diamondbacks	5–3	**Darvish** (7–3)	Kelly (5–1)	**Suárez** (36)	43,310	92–68	W1
161	September 28	@ Diamondbacks	5–0	**Peralta** (3–2)	Puk (4–9)	—	42,915	93–68	W2
162	September 29	@ Diamondbacks	2–11	Pfaadt (11–10)	**Pérez** (5–6)	Nelson (1)	38,892	93–69	L1

Legend: = Win = Loss = Postponement = Clinched playoff spot
Bold = Padres team member

=== Season standings ===
==== National League West ====
NL West
Team	W	L	Pct.	GB	Home	Road
Los Angeles Dodgers	98	64	.605	—	52‍–‍29	46‍–‍35
San Diego Padres	93	69	.574	5	45‍–‍36	48‍–‍33
Arizona Diamondbacks	89	73	.549	9	44‍–‍37	45‍–‍36
San Francisco Giants	80	82	.494	18	42‍–‍39	38‍–‍43
Colorado Rockies	61	101	.377	37	37‍–‍44	24‍–‍57

==== National League Wild Card ====
Division leaders
Team	W	L	Pct.
Los Angeles Dodgers	98	64	.605
Philadelphia Phillies	95	67	.586
Milwaukee Brewers	93	69	.574

Wild Card teams (Top 3 teams qualify for postseason)
Team	W	L	Pct.	GB
San Diego Padres	93	69	.574	+4
Atlanta Braves	89	73	.549	—
New York Mets	89	73	.549	—
Arizona Diamondbacks	89	73	.549	—
St. Louis Cardinals	83	79	.512	6
Chicago Cubs	83	79	.512	6
San Francisco Giants	80	82	.494	9
Cincinnati Reds	77	85	.475	12
Pittsburgh Pirates	76	86	.469	13
Washington Nationals	71	91	.438	18
Miami Marlins	62	100	.383	27
Colorado Rockies	61	101	.377	28

==== Record vs. opponents ====
===== Record vs. National League =====
2024 National League record Source: MLB Standings Grid – 2024
Team	AZ	ATL	CHC	CIN	COL	LAD	MIA	MIL	NYM	PHI	PIT	SD	SF	STL	WSH	AL
Arizona	—	2–5	3–3	5–1	9–4	6–7	4–2	4–3	3–4	4–3	4–2	6–7	7–6	3–3	5–1	24–22
Atlanta	5–2	—	4–2	2–4	3–3	2–5	9–4	2–4	7–6	7–6	3–3	3–4	4–3	2–4	5–8	31–15
Chicago	3–3	2–4	—	5–8	4–2	4–2	4–3	5–8	3–4	2–4	7–6	2–4	3–4	6–7	6–1	27–19
Cincinnati	1–5	4–2	8–5	—	6–1	4–3	5–2	4–9	2–4	4–3	5–8	2–4	2–4	7–6	2–4	21–25
Colorado	4–9	3–3	2–4	1–6	—	3–10	2–5	4–3	2–4	2–4	2–4	8–5	3–10	3–4	2–4	20–26
Los Angeles	7–6	5–2	2–4	3–4	10–3	—	5–1	4–3	4–2	1–5	4–2	5–8	9–4	5–2	4–2	30–16
Miami	2–4	4–9	3–4	2–5	5–2	1–5	—	4–2	6–7	6–7	0–7	2–4	3–3	3–3	2–11	19–27
Milwaukee	3–4	4–2	8–5	9–4	3–4	3–4	2–4	—	5–1	2–4	7–6	2–5	4–2	8–5	2–4	31–15
New York	4–3	6–7	4–3	4–2	4–2	2–4	7–6	1–5	—	6–7	5–2	5–2	2–4	4–2	11–2	24–22
Philadelphia	3–4	6–7	4–2	3–4	4–2	5–1	7–6	4–2	7–6	—	3–4	5–1	5–2	4–2	9–4	26–20
Pittsburgh	2–4	3–3	6–7	8–5	4–2	2–4	7–0	6–7	2–5	4–3	—	0–6	2–4	5–8	4–3	20–26
San Diego	7–6	4–3	4–2	4–2	5–8	8–5	4–2	5–2	2–5	1–5	6–0	—	7–6	3–4	6–0	27–19
San Francisco	6–7	3–4	4–3	4–2	10–3	4–9	3–3	2–4	4–2	2–5	4–2	6–7	—	1–5	4–3	23–23
St. Louis	3–3	4–2	7–6	6–7	4–3	2–5	3–3	5–8	2–4	2–4	8–5	4–3	5–1	—	4–3	24–22
Washington	1–5	8–5	1–6	4–2	4–2	2–4	11–2	4–2	2–11	4–9	3–4	0–6	3–4	3–4	—	21–25

Updated with the results of all games through September 30, 2024.

===== Record vs. American League =====
2024 National League record vs. American League Source: MLB Standings
Team	BAL	BOS	CWS	CLE	DET	HOU	KC	LAA	MIN	NYY	OAK	SEA	TB	TEX	TOR
Arizona	1–2	3–0	2–1	3–0	1–2	1–2	2–1	2–1	1–2	1–2	2–1	1–2	0–3	2–2	2–1
Atlanta	1–2	3–1	1–2	2–1	3–0	3–0	2–1	2–1	3–0	2–1	2–1	1–2	2–1	2–1	2–1
Chicago	3–0	1–2	4–0	0–3	2–1	3–0	2–1	2–1	2–1	1–2	1–2	2–1	1–2	1–2	2–1
Cincinnati	0–3	1–2	3–0	1–3	0–3	3–0	0–3	3–0	2–1	3–0	1–2	0–3	1–2	1–2	2–1
Colorado	1–2	2–1	1–2	2–1	1–2	0–4	2–1	2–1	1–2	1–2	1–2	1–2	1–2	3–0	1–2
Los Angeles	2–1	3–0	3–0	2–1	1–2	1–2	2–1	2–2	2–1	2–1	2–1	3–0	2–1	1–2	2–1
Miami	2–1	0–3	2–1	1–2	2–1	0–3	1–2	0–3	2–1	1–2	1–2	2–1	1–3	1–2	3–0
Milwaukee	2–1	2–1	3–0	3–0	2–1	1–2	1–2	2–1	3–1	1–2	2–1	2–1	2–1	3–0	2–1
New York	2–1	3–0	3–0	0–3	1–2	1–2	2–1	1–2	2–1	4–0	1–2	0–3	0–3	2–1	2–1
Philadelphia	1–2	1–2	3–0	1–2	2–1	2–1	2–1	2–1	1–2	0–3	1–2	1–2	3–0	3–0	3–1
Pittsburgh	2–1	0–3	3–0	1–2	2–2	2–1	1–2	1–2	2–1	2–1	0–3	2–1	1–2	1–2	1–2
San Diego	2–1	2–1	3–0	2–1	2–1	2–1	2–1	0–3	2–1	1–2	3–0	1–3	2–1	2–1	1–2
San Francisco	2–1	1–2	2–1	1–2	2–1	2–1	3–0	1–2	2–1	0–3	2–2	1–2	1–2	2–1	1–2
St. Louis	3–0	2–1	1–2	2–1	1–2	1–2	1–3	2–1	2–1	2–1	2–1	1–2	2–1	2–1	0–3
Washington	2–2	1–2	1–2	1–2	2–1	2–1	0–3	2–1	1–2	2–1	1–2	2–1	1–2	1–2	2–1

Updated with the results of all games through September 30, 2024.

== Postseason ==
=== Game log ===
2024 Postseason Game Log: 4–3 (Home: 3–1; Away: 1–2)
NL Wild Card Series: 2–0 (Home: 2–0; Away: 0–0)

#	Date	Opponent	Score	Win	Loss	Save	Attendance	Series
1	October 1	Braves	4–0	King (1–0)	Smith-Shawver (0–1)	—	47,647	1–0
2	October 2	Braves	5–4	Hoeing (1–0)	Fried (0–1)	Suárez (1)	47,705	2–0

NL Division Series: 2–3 (Home: 1–1; Away: 1–2)

#	Date	Opponent	Score	Win	Loss	Save	Attendance	Series
1	October 5	@ Dodgers	5–7	Brasier (1–0)	Morejón (0–1)	Treinen (1)	53,028	0–1
2	October 6	@ Dodgers	10–2	Darvish (1–0)	Flaherty (0–1)	—	54,119	1–1
3	October 8	Dodgers	6–5	King (2–0)	Buehler (0–1)	Suárez (2)	47,744	2–1
4	October 9	Dodgers	0–8	Phillips (1–0)	Cease (0–1)	—	47,773	2–2
5	October 11	@ Dodgers	0–2	Yamamoto (1–0)	Darvish (1–1)	Treinen (2)	53,183	2–3

=== Postseason rosters ===
Playoff rosters
National League Wild Card Series

- Pitchers: 1 Yuki Matsui 11 Yu Darvish 34 Michael King 40 Jason Adam 44 Joe Musgrove 50 Adrián Morejón 56 Jeremiah Estrada 58 Wandy Peralta 66 Tanner Scott 75 Robert Suárez 78 Bryan Hoeing 84 Dylan Cease
- Catchers: 15 Elías Díaz 20 Kyle Higashioka
- Infielders: 2 Xander Bogaerts 4 Luis Arráez 9 Jake Cronenworth 13 Manny Machado 14 Tyler Wade 16 Nick Ahmed 39 Donovan Solano
- Outfielders: 3 Jackson Merrill 10 Jurickson Profar 23 Fernando Tatís Jr. 24 David Peralta 28 Brandon Lockridge

National League Division Series

- Pitchers: 1 Yuki Matsui 11 Yu Darvish 34 Michael King 37 Alek Jacob 40 Jason Adam 50 Adrián Morejón 54 Martín Pérez 56 Jeremiah Estrada 58 Wandy Peralta 66 Tanner Scott 75 Robert Suárez 78 Bryan Hoeing 84 Dylan Cease
- Catchers: 15 Elías Díaz 20 Kyle Higashioka
- Infielders: 2 Xander Bogaerts 4 Luis Arráez 9 Jake Cronenworth 13 Manny Machado 14 Tyler Wade 39 Donovan Solano
- Outfielders: 3 Jackson Merrill 10 Jurickson Profar 23 Fernando Tatís Jr. 24 David Peralta 28 Brandon Lockridge

== Roster ==
2024 San Diego Padres
Roster
Pitchers: 40 Jason Adam; 60 Pedro Ávila; 76 Jhony Brito; 84 Dylan Cease; 59 Tom Cosgrove; 11 Yu Darvish; 48 Austin Davis; 62 Enyel De Los Santos; 52 Carl Edwards Jr.; 56 Jeremiah Estrada; 71 Logan Gillaspie; 78 Bryan Hoeing; 37 Alek Jacob; 34 Michael King; 32 Stephen Kolek; 1 Yuki Matsui; 36 Adam Mazur; 50 Adrián Morejón; 44 Joe Musgrove; 58 Wandy Peralta; 54 Martín Pérez; 25,54 Sean Reynolds; 66 Tanner Scott; 75 Robert Suárez; 98 Randy Vásquez; 61 Matt Waldron	Catchers: 12 Luis Campusano; 15 Elías Díaz; 20 Kyle Higashioka; 29 Brett Sullivan; Infielders: 16 Nick Ahmed; 4 Luis Arráez; 17 Matthew Batten; 2 Xander Bogaerts; 9 Jake Cronenworth; 7 Ha-seong Kim; 13 Manny Machado; 18 Mason McCoy; 22 Graham Pauley; 5 Eguy Rosario; 39 Donovan Solano; 14 Tyler Wade	Outfielders: 28 José Azócar; 27 Bryce Johnson; 28 Brandon Lockridge; 3 Jackson Merrill; 24 David Peralta; 10 Jurickson Profar; 23 Fernando Tatís Jr.	Manager: 8 Mike Shildt; Coaches: 47 Vic Rodriguez (hitting); 89 Mike McCoy (assistant hitting); 85 Pat O'Sullivan (assistant hitting); 53 Ben Fritz (bullpen); 46 David Macias (first base/outfield instructor); 33 Tim Leiper (third base/infield instructor); 57 Ruben Niebla (pitching); 83 Peter Summerville (game planning/coaching assistant); 82 Brian Esposito (catching); 81 Morgan Burkhart (major league coaching assistant); 66 Ryan Barba (major league field coordinator/bench coach); 86 Heberto Andrade (bullpen catcher/coaching assistant)

== Player stats ==
= Indicates team leader

= Indicates league leader

=== Batting ===
Note: G = Games played; AB = At bats; R = Runs scored; H = Hits; 2B = Doubles; 3B = Triples; HR = Home runs; RBI = Runs batted in; SB = Stolen bases; BB = Walks; AVG = Batting average; SLG = Slugging average

Player	G	AB	R	H	2B	3B	HR	RBI	SB	BB	AVG	SLG
Manny Machado	152	593	77	163	30	0	29	105	11	45	.275	.472
Jake Cronenworth	155	577	72	139	29	3	17	83	5	61	.241	.390
Jurickson Profar	158	564	94	158	29	0	24	85	10	76	.280	.459
Jackson Merrill	156	554	77	162	31	6	24	90	16	29	.292	.500
Luis Arráez	117	500	61	159	24	2	4	41	9	16	.318	.398
Xander Bogaerts	111	428	50	113	15	1	11	44	13	28	.264	.381
Ha-seong Kim	121	403	60	94	16	3	11	47	22	58	.233	.370
Fernando Tatís Jr.	102	398	64	110	21	1	21	49	11	32	.276	.492
Donovan Solano	96	283	31	81	13	0	8	35	2	22	.286	.417
Luis Campusano	91	277	37	63	13	0	8	40	0	20	.227	.361
Kyle Higashioka	84	246	29	54	10	1	17	45	2	15	.220	.476
David Peralta	91	236	35	63	11	0	8	28	2	22	.267	.415
Tyler Wade	90	138	28	30	3	0	0	8	8	11	.217	.239
José Azócar	61	73	13	16	2	0	0	2	5	5	.219	.247
Bryce Johnson	47	63	9	13	2	0	0	4	1	7	.206	.238
Eguy Rosario	30	53	5	13	6	0	3	6	0	2	.245	.528
Mason McCoy	19	49	7	10	2	0	0	3	1	5	.204	.245
Graham Pauley	13	32	4	4	0	0	2	5	0	0	.125	.313
Elías Díaz	12	21	1	4	2	0	1	3	0	3	.190	.429
Brett Sullivan	7	16	1	3	0	0	1	2	0	1	.188	.375
Brandon Lockridge	12	12	4	2	0	0	1	1	2	0	.167	.417
Nick Ahmed	2	7	1	1	0	0	0	0	0	0	.143	.143
Matthew Batten	1	3	0	1	0	1	0	0	0	0	.333	1.000
Team totals	162	5526	760	1456	259	18	190	726	120	458	.263	.420

Source:Baseball Reference

=== Pitching ===
Note: W = Wins; L = Losses; ERA = Earned run average; G = Games pitched; GS = Games started; SV = Saves; IP = Innings pitched; H = Hits allowed; R = Runs allowed; ER = Earned runs allowed; BB = Walks allowed; SO = Strikeouts

Player	W	L	ERA	G	GS	SV	IP	H	R	ER	BB	SO
Dylan Cease	14	11	3.47	33	33	0	189.1	137	80	73	65	224
Michael King	13	9	2.95	31	30	0	173.2	144	71	57	63	201
Matt Waldron	7	11	4.91	27	26	0	146.2	145	84	80	40	133
Joe Musgrove	6	5	3.88	19	19	0	99.2	94	44	43	23	101
Randy Vásquez	4	7	4.87	20	20	0	98.0	119	56	53	29	62
Yu Darvish	7	3	3.31	16	16	0	81.2	65	32	30	22	78
Robert Suárez	9	3	2.77	65	0	36	65.0	52	21	20	16	59
Adrián Morejón	3	2	2.83	60	0	2	63.2	63	24	20	21	71
Yuki Matsui	4	2	3.73	64	0	0	62.2	46	27	26	27	69
Jeremiah Estrada	6	3	2.95	62	0	1	61.0	42	22	20	23	94
Martín Pérez	3	1	3.46	10	10	0	52.0	46	20	20	17	44
Stephen Kolek	3	0	5.21	42	0	0	46.2	59	30	27	12	39
Jhony Brito	1	2	4.12	26	0	0	43.2	49	23	20	10	29
Enyel De Los Santos	1	2	4.46	44	0	1	40.1	39	21	20	13	48
Wandy Peralta	3	2	3.99	46	0	0	38.1	33	19	17	13	22
Adam Mazur	1	3	7.49	8	8	0	33.2	40	28	28	21	22
Jason Adam	3	0	1.01	27	0	0	26.2	14	3	3	7	31
Tanner Scott	3	1	2.73	28	0	4	26.1	26	10	8	9	31
Bryan Hoeing	1	1	1.52	18	0	0	23.2	14	5	4	5	18
Alek Jacob	0	0	2.45	7	0	0	14.2	9	4	4	2	19
Tom Cosgrove	0	1	11.66	18	0	0	14.2	23	19	19	6	15
Logan Gillaspie	0	0	7.15	9	0	0	11.1	15	9	9	0	7
Sean Reynolds	0	0	0.82	9	0	0	11.0	10	1	1	5	21
Pedro Ávila	1	0	9.00	4	0	0	8.0	5	8	8	6	9
Austin Davis	0	0	9.00	7	0	0	7.0	6	8	7	5	6
Carl Edwards Jr.	0	0	—	1	0	0	0.0	1	0	0	2	0
Team totals	93	69	3.86	162	162	44	1439.1	1296	669	617	462	1453

Source:Baseball Reference

== Farm system ==
Level	Team	League	Manager	W	L	Position
Triple-A	El Paso Chihuahuas	Pacific Coast League				
Double-A	San Antonio Missions	Texas League				
High-A	Fort Wayne TinCaps	Midwest League				
Low-A	Lake Elsinore Storm	California League				
Rookie	ACL Padres	Arizona Complex League				
Rookie	DSL Padres Gold	Dominican Summer League				
Rookie	DSL Padres Brown	Dominican Summer League				
