= 2024 National League Wild Card Series =

Teams
Team (Wins)		Manager	Season
New York Mets (2)		Carlos Mendoza	89–73 (.549), GB: 6
Milwaukee Brewers (1)		Pat Murphy	93–69 (.574), GA: 10
- Dates: October 1–3
- Television: ESPN
- TV announcers: Jon Sciambi, Doug Glanville, and Jesse Rogers
- Radio: ESPN
- Radio announcers: Mike Couzens and Chris Burke
- Umpires: Vic Carapazza, Mike Estabrook, Brennan Miller, Alan Porter (crew chief), Chris Segal, Alex Tosi

Teams
Team (Wins)		Manager	Season
San Diego Padres (2)		Mike Shildt	93–69 (.574), GB: 5
Atlanta Braves (0)		Brian Snitker	89–73 (.549), GB: 6
- Dates: October 1–2
- Television: ESPN (Game 1); ESPN2 (Game 2)
- TV announcers: Karl Ravech, David Cone, Eduardo Pérez, and Buster Olney
- Radio: ESPN
- Radio announcers: Roxy Bernstein and Gregg Olson
- Umpires: Erich Bacchus, Nestor Ceja, Phil Cuzzi, Dan Iassogna (crew chief), Jansen Visconti, Mark Wegner

The 2024 National League Wild Card Series (branded as the Wild Card Series presented by T-Mobile 5G Home Internet for sponsorship reasons) were two best-of-three playoff series in Major League Baseball's (MLB) 2024 postseason that determined the participating teams of the 2024 National League Division Series (NLDS). Both Wild Card Series began on October 1, with Game 2s for October 2, and Game 3 for one of the series on October 3. ESPN broadcast both Wild Card Series in the United States together with ESPN Radio.

These matchups were:

- (3) Milwaukee Brewers (NL Central champions) vs. (6) New York Mets (third wild card): Mets won the series, 2–1.
- (4) San Diego Padres (first wild card) vs. (5) Atlanta Braves (second wild card): Padres won the series, 2–0.

== Background ==
The lowest-seeded division winner and three wild card teams in each league play in a best-of-three series after the end of the regular season. The winners of each league's wild card rounds advance to face the two best division winners in that league's Division Series.

Entering September 30, the day before the Wild Card Series, the Arizona Diamondbacks had finished their season with 89 wins, while the New York Mets and Atlanta Braves were tied with 88 wins. Due to Hurricane Helene that impacted Georgia, two games between the Mets and Braves from the week prior were postponed, and the two teams were forced to make up the remaining games in a doubleheader at Truist Park on the day before the postseason began. Both Atlanta and New York had a head-to-head tiebreaker over the Diamondbacks, meaning both teams would only have to win one game in the doubleheader to clinch a playoff berth. However, if either Atlanta or New York lost both games in the doubleheader, they would be eliminated and the Diamondbacks would clinch a playoff berth. In the first game of the doubleheader, the Mets defeated the Braves, 8–7 to clinch a playoff spot. In the second game, the Braves defeated the Mets, 3–0, clinching the #5 seed, the #6 seed for the Mets, and eliminating the Diamondbacks.

The Milwaukee Brewers (93–69) qualified for the postseason as the National League Central division winner, clinching the division via a Chicago Cubs loss on September 18. As the team with the lowest record among other division winners in the National League for this season, they are locked into the third seed following the Philadelphia Phillies victory over the Chicago Cubs on September 25, thus giving Philadelphia a first-round bye. Milwaukee is making their sixth postseason appearance in seven seasons and are looking for their first postseason series victory since 2018. They hosted the New York Mets (89–73), who clinched a spot in the postseason via a thrilling 8–7 victory against the Atlanta Braves in Game 1 of a doubleheader on September 30, a game which saw 12 runs being scored in the last two innings. New York, who was 11 games under .500 at one point in the season, is returning to the postseason after failing to qualify the year previous. Milwaukee won the season series, 5–1, which included them taking two games of three just a few days ago. Current Mets president of baseball operations, David Stearns, held the same role with Milwaukee from 2019–2022 (he was the team's general manager from 2015–2018, as well). This is the first postseason match-up between the Brewers and Mets.

The San Diego Padres (93–69) clinched a playoff spot on September 24 and were locked in to the Wild Card three days later after losing to the Los Angeles Dodgers, ending their division title aspirations. It is their third playoff appearance in the past five seasons and first 90–win season since 2010. They hosted the Atlanta Braves (89–73), who clinched a spot in the postseason via a 3–0 win over the New York Mets in Game 2 of a doubleheader on September 30. The Braves are making their seventh straight postseason appearance and first as a wild card since 2012. The Padres won the season series, 4–3. This is the first postseason match-up between the Braves and Padres since the 1998 NLCS, which was won by San Diego in six games.

As the top two seeds, the Los Angeles Dodgers (98–64) and Philadelphia Phillies (95–67) earned a first-round bye and home-field advantage in the NLDS. This was the first year since 2014 that no team in Major League Baseball won 100 games or more in the regular season.

== Matchups ==
=== Milwaukee Brewers vs. New York Mets ===
New York won the series, 2–1.

Game	Date	Score	Location	Time	Attendance
1	October 1	New York Mets – 8, Milwaukee Brewers – 4	American Family Field	2:43	40,022
2	October 2	New York Mets – 3, Milwaukee Brewers – 5	American Family Field	2:43	40,350
3	October 3	New York Mets – 4, Milwaukee Brewers – 2	American Family Field	2:50	41,594

=== San Diego Padres vs. Atlanta Braves ===
San Diego won the series, 2–0.

Game	Date	Score	Location	Time	Attendance
1	October 1	Atlanta Braves – 0, San Diego Padres – 4	Petco Park	2:09	47,647
2	October 2	Atlanta Braves – 4, San Diego Padres – 5	Petco Park	2:45	47,705

== Milwaukee vs. New York ==
This is the first postseason meeting between the New York Mets and Milwaukee Brewers.

=== Game 1 ===
October 1, 2024 4:32 pm (CDT) at American Family Field in Milwaukee, Wisconsin 74 °F (23 °C), Roof Closed
Team	1	2	3	4	5	6	7	8	9	R	H	E
New York	0	3	0	0	5	0	0	0	0	8	7	1
Milwaukee	2	0	0	2	0	0	0	0	0	4	8	0
WP: Luis Severino (1–0) LP: Joel Payamps (0–1); Attendance: 40,022; Boxscore

In the bottom of the first, William Contreras singled off Luis Severino to score Brice Turang and the Brewers made it 2–0 when Rhys Hoskins got hit by a pitch from Severino, allowing Jackson Chourio to score. In the top of the second, Jesse Winker hit a two-run triple to right field off Freddy Peralta to tie the game at two apiece. Starling Marte's sacrifice fly scored Winker to give the Mets a 3–2 lead. Chourio hit an RBI double in the bottom of the fourth to tie the game at three. Later in the same inning, Contreras delivered an RBI groundout to allow Turang to score to put the Brewers back on top, 4–3. In the top of the fifth, Jose Iglesias tied the game with a RBI single scoring Tyrone Taylor. Later in the same inning, Mark Vientos and J. D. Martinez both had two-run singles to give the Mets the 8–4 lead. The bullpens for both teams then threw up zeros as the Mets took Game 1 of the best-of-three.

=== Game 2 ===
October 2, 2024 6:38 pm (CDT) at American Family Field in Milwaukee, Wisconsin 73 °F (23 °C), Roof Closed
Team	1	2	3	4	5	6	7	8	9	R	H	E
New York	1	2	0	0	0	0	0	0	0	3	8	0
Milwaukee	1	0	0	0	1	0	0	3	X	5	11	1
WP: Joe Ross (1–0) LP: Phil Maton (0–1) Sv: Devin Williams (1); Home runs: NYM: None; MIL: Jackson Chourio 2 (2), Garrett Mitchell (1); Attendance: 40,350; Boxscore

In the top of the first, Brandon Nimmo delivered an RBI single off Frankie Montas to score Jose Iglesias, giving the Mets a 1–0 lead. The Brewers answered back by tying the game 1–1 when Jackson Chourio hit a solo home run off Sean Manaea. The Mets retook the lead in the top of the second when Francisco Álvarez hit an RBI single off Montas to score Starling Marte. Francisco Lindor then extended the lead for the Mets when he hit a sacrifice fly to score Tyrone Taylor to make it 3–1. In the bottom of the fifth, Blake Perkins’s sacrifice fly to score Brice Turang cut the Mets' lead to 3–2. In the bottom of the eighth, Chourio hit his second home run of the game off Phil Maton, tying the game at 3–3; and Garrett Mitchell gave the Brewers a 5–3 lead with a two-run home run, scoring Willy Adames. Devin Williams closed out the Mets with a 1-2-3 inning as the Brewers tied the series at 1–1, forcing a winner-take-all Game 3.

After the game, manager Carlos Mendoza said that, as a power hitter, Pete Alonso was "one swing away from, you know, the 'big one'".

=== Game 3 ===
October 3, 2024 6:08 pm (CDT) at American Family Field in Milwaukee, Wisconsin 73 °F (23 °C), Roof Closed
Team	1	2	3	4	5	6	7	8	9	R	H	E
New York	0	0	0	0	0	0	0	0	4	4	5	0
Milwaukee	0	0	0	0	0	0	2	0	0	2	7	0
WP: Edwin Díaz (1–0) LP: Devin Williams (0–1) Sv: David Peterson (1); Home runs: NYM: Pete Alonso (1); MIL: Jake Bauers (1), Sal Frelick (1); Attendance: 41,594; Boxscore

The winner-take-all Game 3 pit rookie against veteran; with the Brewers starting Tobias Myers against the Mets' Jose Quintana. Both pitchers would answer the call, with Myers pitching five scoreless innings, only giving up two hits to Francisco Lindor, while Quintana would allow four hits in six shutout frames. After Trevor Megill and Nick Mears sat the Mets down in order in both the sixth and seventh, the breakthrough would finally occur. On a full count, pinch hitter Jake Bauers hit a solo home run off José Buttó, giving the Brewers a 1–0 lead. And before the crowd could settle down, Sal Frelick blasted the very next pitch into the right field seats to double the advantage. Edwin Díaz was then brought in and despite a shaky rest of the seventh, kept the Mets within reach with two scoreless innings.

In the top of the ninth, with Milwaukee three outs away from the NLDS, the Brewers brought out Devin Williams to clinch the series. However, this seemingly clear choice would instead lead to another spectacular Brewers postseason collapse. Francisco Lindor led off the inning with a check-swing walk on a full count, and after a strikeout to Mark Vientos, Brandon Nimmo singled to put runners on the corners for the Mets, bringing up Pete Alonso. On a 3-1 count, Alonso launched a crushing three-run home run over the right-field wall to give the Mets a 3-2 lead. Things would further unravel for the Brewers when with two outs, Jesse Winker was hit by a pitch, stole second, and was singled home by Starling Marte, extending the Mets' lead to 4–2. In the bottom of the ninth, David Peterson closed out the game and series by inducing a series-ending double play ball off the bat of Brice Turang to send the Mets to their first NLDS since 2015. The Mets faced their division rival Philadelphia Phillies for the first time in postseason history.

Alonso's home run in the top of the ninth made him the first player in MLB history to hit a go-ahead home run while the team was trailing in the ninth inning or later in a winner-take-all playoff game.

National League Central teams fell to 0–8 in postseason series since 2020. (Note: NL Central in postseason play since 2020: *2020: Brewers vs. Dodgers, Brewers defeated in 2 the NLWCS *2020: Marlins vs. Cubs, Cubs defeated in 2 in the NLWCS *2020: Cardinals vs. Padres, Cardinals defeated in 3 in the NLWCS *2021: Cardinals vs. Dodgers, Cardinals defeated 3–1 in the NL Wild Card Game *2021: Braves vs. Brewers, Brewers defeated in 4 in the NLDS *2022: Phillies vs. Cardinals, Cardinals defeated in 2 in the NLWCS *2023: Diamondbacks vs. Brewers, Brewers defeated in 2 in the NLWCS)

This was the final game called by longtime Brewers radio broadcaster Bob Uecker, who died three months later at the age of 90.

=== Composite line score ===
2024 NLWC (2–1): New York Mets beat Milwaukee Brewers

Team	1	2	3	4	5	6	7	8	9	R	H	E
New York Mets	1	5	0	0	5	0	0	0	4	15	20	1
Milwaukee Brewers	3	0	0	2	1	0	2	3	0	11	26	1
Total attendance: 121,966 Average attendance: 40,655

== San Diego vs. Atlanta ==
This is the second postseason meeting between the San Diego Padres and the Atlanta Braves. Their last postseason meeting was in the 1998 National League Championship Series, which was won by San Diego in six games.

=== Game 1 ===
October 1, 2024 5:38 pm (PDT) at Petco Park in San Diego, California 71 °F (23 °C), Mostly Sunny
Team	1	2	3	4	5	6	7	8	9	R	H	E
Atlanta	0	0	0	0	0	0	0	0	0	0	7	0
San Diego	2	1	0	0	0	0	0	1	X	4	5	0
WP: Michael King (1–0) LP: AJ Smith-Shawver (0–1); Home runs: ATL: None; SD: Fernando Tatís Jr. (1), Kyle Higashioka (1); Attendance: 47,647; Boxscore

In the bottom of the first, Fernando Tatís Jr.'s two-run home run off AJ Smith-Shawver gave the Padres an early 2–0 lead. The next inning had the Padres extending the lead when Kyle Higashioka hit a sacrifice fly to score Jake Cronenworth. Higashioka extended the lead to 4–0 in the bottom of the eighth with a solo home run off Luke Jackson. The Padres held the shutout in the final inning to win Game 1.

=== Game 2 ===
October 2, 2024 5:38 pm (PDT) at Petco Park in San Diego, California 70 °F (21 °C), Clear
Team	1	2	3	4	5	6	7	8	9	R	H	E
Atlanta	1	0	0	0	1	0	0	2	0	4	6	0
San Diego	0	5	0	0	0	0	0	0	X	5	10	0
WP: Bryan Hoeing (1–0) LP: Max Fried (0–1) Sv: Robert Suárez (1); Home runs: ATL: Jorge Soler (1), Michael Harris II (1); SD: Kyle Higashioka (2); Attendance: 47,705; Boxscore

In the top of the first, Marcell Ozuna hit a sacrifice fly to score Michael Harris II, giving the Braves a 1–0 lead. In the bottom of the second, Kyle Higashioka’s home run off Max Fried tied the game at 1–1. Then, Manny Machado hit a two-run double scoring Luis Arráez and Fernando Tatís Jr., putting the Padres in the lead at 3–1. Then, Jackson Merrill two-run triple scored Jurickson Profar and Machado, extending the Padres' lead to 5–1. In the top of the fifth, Jorge Soler hit a solo home run off Bryan Hoeing to cut the Padres' lead to 5–2. In the top of the eighth, Michael Harris II hit a two-run home run off Jason Adam to cut the Braves' deficit to one. The Padres' Robert Suárez closed out the Braves with a 1-2-3 inning in the top of the ninth to sweep the series and send the Padres to the NLDS to face their division rival Los Angeles Dodgers. With the loss, the Braves were eliminated in their first round of the postseason for the third straight year, as they lost the NLDS to the Phillies the previous two years.

=== Composite line score ===
2024 NLWC (2–0): San Diego Padres beat Atlanta Braves

Team	1	2	3	4	5	6	7	8	9	R	H	E
Atlanta Braves	1	0	0	0	1	0	0	2	0	4	13	0
San Diego Padres	2	6	0	0	0	0	0	1	0	9	15	0
Total attendance: 95,352 Average attendance: 47,676

== See also ==
- 2024 American League Wild Card Series
- Milwaukee Brewers reverse World Series curse
