= Milwaukee Brewers reverse World Series curse =

Superstition in American baseball

The Milwaukee Brewers reverse World Series curse was a baseball-related superstition that derives from the fact that every baseball team that the Milwaukee Brewers lost to in the postseason made it to and/or won the World Series, whereas the Brewers themselves remained title-less in their history. The reverse curse is notable for its ironic twist, where the team defeating the Brewers is propelled to the World Series. This contrasts with other traditional baseball hexes such as the Chicago Cubs' Curse of the Billy Goat, which do not prop up any other team up, instead preventing a single "cursed" team from success.

In 2024, the New York Mets defeated the Brewers in the Wild Card Series but were eliminated by the Los Angeles Dodgers in the NLCS, marking the first breach of the curse, and effectively ending the curse's unbroken streak. After a brief return with the Brewers' defeat to the 2025 Dodgers, the curse was broken once and for all when they swept the Dodgers in the 2026 National League Championship Series and later defeated the Tampa Bay Rays for their first ever World Series title.

== Background ==
Brewers losses in postseason play (1981–2025) Blue = World Series winner
| Year | Winning Team | Losing Team (Brewers) |
|---|---|---|
| 1981 ALDS | New York Yankees | Milwaukee Brewers |
| 1982 World Series | St. Louis Cardinals | Milwaukee Brewers |
| 2008 NLDS | Philadelphia Phillies | Milwaukee Brewers |
| 2011 NLCS | St. Louis Cardinals | Milwaukee Brewers |
| 2018 NLCS | Los Angeles Dodgers | Milwaukee Brewers |
| 2019 NLWCG | Washington Nationals | Milwaukee Brewers |
| 2020 NLWCS | Los Angeles Dodgers | Milwaukee Brewers |
| 2021 NLDS | Atlanta Braves | Milwaukee Brewers |
| 2023 NLWCS | Arizona Diamondbacks | Milwaukee Brewers |
| 2024 NLWCS | New York Mets | Milwaukee Brewers |
| 2025 NLCS | Los Angeles Dodgers | Milwaukee Brewers |

In their first season in Milwaukee after their relocation from Boston, the Braves finished 92–62 (.597) and drew a then-NL record 1.8 million fans. The success of the team was noted by many owners. Not coincidentally, the Philadelphia Athletics, St. Louis Browns, Brooklyn Dodgers, and New York Giants all relocated over the next five years. As the 1950s progressed, the reinvigorated Braves became increasingly competitive. Sluggers Eddie Mathews and Hank Aaron drove the offense (they would hit a combined 1,226 home runs as Braves, with 850 of those coming while the franchise was in Milwaukee), while Warren Spahn, Lew Burdette, and Bob Buhl anchored the rotation. In 1957, the Milwaukee Braves won the World Series, which would ultimately be the city's only baseball world championship for 69 years.

Although still successful on the field, the once league-leading attendance would slip in the 1960s. The franchise had attempted to move to Atlanta shortly after the 1964 season; it was delayed a year, and the team relocated for the 1966 season. In Milwaukee, the Braves never had a losing season.

Following the Braves departure from Milwaukee after the 1965 season, the city was quickly considered for expansion, as stated by Commissioner of Baseball William Eckert in May 1966, citing that expansion would occur in "eight to 10 years." However, by 1968, Milwaukee was rejected for expansion due to its close proximity to Chicago.

As early as June 1969, an MLB memo envisaged the newly founded Seattle Pilots of the American League moving to Milwaukee. Concerns for the Pilots' viability led to several attempts to relocate the team to Milwaukee, which lead to Pilots owner Dewey Soriano to try and sell the team. Following failed attempts to sell to former Braves minority owner Bud Selig and several deals involving Westin Hotels head Eddie Carlson, and bankruptcy of the team on March 31—seven days before Opening Day—the team was sold to Selig and the team was moved to Milwaukee as the Milwaukee Brewers. Due to these circumstances of the Pilots' move to Milwaukee, some think this is when the curse was placed on the team, with others believing the Brewers can not win a World Series until the Mariners (Seattle's replacement for the Pilots) wins one first. The National League's 32-year hiatus from the city would end in 1998 when the Brewers were transferred to the National League due to realignment resulting from the 1998 Major League Baseball expansion.

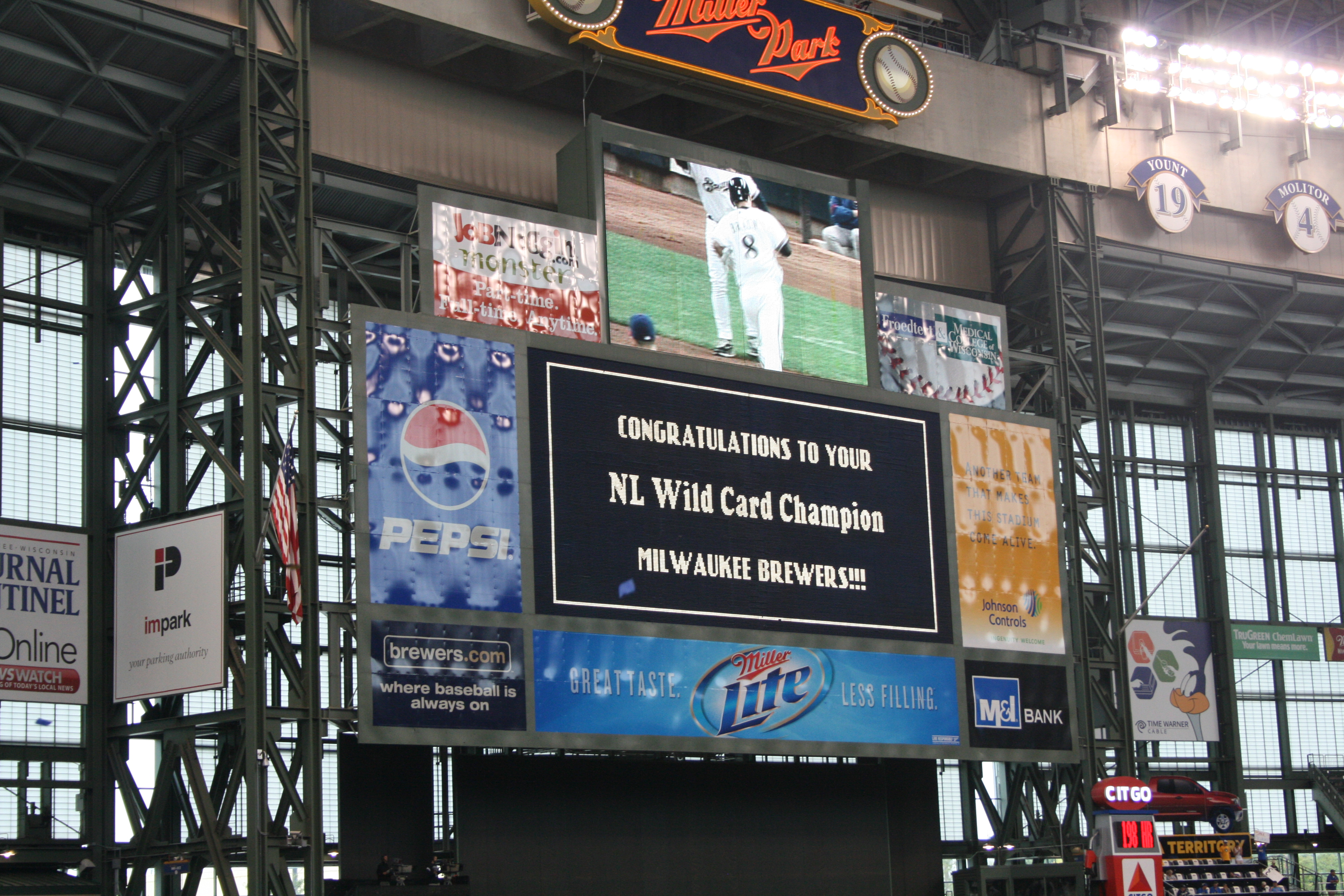
The Brewers clinch a playoff spot on the last day of the 2008 season. This would be the year they lost to the eventual-champion Phillies in the NLDS.

From their inception in 1970 through the 2023 season, the Brewers played in nine postseasons and won zero World Series. Their opponents appeared in all nine World Series and won six of them. Every postseason the Brewers have played in except for one came in a year with the Division Series, so there were at least three playoff rounds in all those years except 1982.

The curse did not gain traction until the 2019 Washington Nationals improbably won the World Series by beating the 106-win Los Angeles Dodgers and the 107-win Houston Astros. On their way to the World Series, the Nationals defeated the Brewers in the National League Wild Card Game, scoring three runs in the eighth inning to win, 4–3. In 2023, it gained further momentum as a baseball curse when the 84-win Diamondbacks made the World Series after defeating the Brewers in the Wild Card Series (two rounds prior to the World Series).

== 2024–2026: End of the curse ==
American Family Field before Game 2 of the 2026 World Series.

The "curse" was considered lifted when the New York Mets, who beat the Brewers in the 2024 Wild Card round, were themselves defeated by the Los Angeles Dodgers in the NLCS, thus not qualifying for the World Series. This underlines the unique nature of the Brewer's curse, where part of the curse did not have to end with the cursed team winning a World Series.

However the reverse curse returned the very next year. As the top National League seed, the Brewers defeated the Chicago Cubs in the 2025 National League Division Series. They met the defending champion Dodgers at the NLCS, which they lost in a sweep, allowing the Dodgers to appear in (and subsequently go on to win) the World Series.

In 2026, the Brewers won their fourth-straight NL Central championship, with the best record in baseball. They secured a bye to the NLDS for a second consecutive season, while achieving the first 100-win regular season in franchise history, finishing with a 103-59 record. In the NLDS, they faced the San Diego Padres, defeating them in four games to advance to the NLCS for the second year in a row. They swept the Los Angeles Dodgers in the 2026 NLCS and defeated the Tampa Bay Rays in five games to win the NL pennant and the World Series for the first time in their history, breaking the "curse" in the process.

== See also ==
- Baseball superstition
- 1982 World Series
- 2024 National League Championship Series
- 2026 World Series
