= Korry Howell =

American baseball player (born 1998)

Gary SouthShore RailCats – No. 1
- Outfielder
- Born: September 1, 1998 (age 27); Chicago, Illinois, U.S.
- Bats: Right Throws: Right

Korry Howell (born September 1, 1998) is an American professional baseball outfielder for the Gary SouthShore RailCats of the American Association of Professional Baseball.

== Career ==
=== Amateur ===
Howell attended Homewood-Flossmoor High School in Flossmoor, Illinois, and Kirkwood Community College in Cedar Rapids, Iowa. Following his freshman year at Kirkwood, he was selected by the Kansas City Royals in the 19th round of the 2017 Major League Baseball draft, but did not sign. As a sophomore at Kirkwood, he hit .401 with forty stolen bases over sixty games.

=== Milwaukee Brewers ===
Howell was drafted by the Milwaukee Brewers in the 12th round, with the 365th overall selection, of the 2018 Major League Baseball draft, and signed for $210,000.

Howell made his professional debut with the Rookie-level Arizona League Brewers, batting .311/.398/.350 over 28 games. In 2019, he played with the Wisconsin Timber Rattlers of the Single–A Midwest League with whom he hit .235 with two home runs, 22 RBI, 12 doubles, and 19 stolen bases over 91 games. He did not play a minor league game in 2020 after the cancellation of the season due to the COVID-19 pandemic, and spent the summer playing with the Joliet Slammers of the independent Frontier League. To begin the 2021 season, he was assigned back to the Timber Rattlers, now members of the High-A Central. He was promoted to the Biloxi Shuckers of the Double-A South in early August. Over 107 games between the two clubs, he slashed .244/.349/.455 with 16 home runs, 51 RBI, and 24 stolen bases.

=== San Diego Padres ===
On April 6, 2022, Howell was traded to the San Diego Padres along with Brett Sullivan in exchange for Victor Caratini. He was assigned to the San Antonio Missions of the Double-A Texas League to open the season. He batted .248 with six home runs, 20 RBI, and 12 stolen bases over 48 games before suffering a season-ending injury.

Howell returned to San Antonio to open the 2023 season. In 69 games split between the Missions and the rookie–level Arizona Complex League Padres, he accumulated a .168/.279/.274 batting line with 4 home runs, 24 RBI, and 21 stolen bases. Howell was released by the Padres organization on March 12, 2024.

=== Staten Island FerryHawks ===
On May 14, 2024, Howell signed with the Staten Island FerryHawks of the Atlantic League of Professional Baseball. In 16 games for Staten Island, he batted .135/.246/.212 with one home run, three RBI, and three stolen bases. On June 10, Howell was released by the FerryHawks.

=== Lexington Legends ===
On June 13, 2024, Howell signed with the Lexington Legends of the Atlantic League of Professional Baseball. The next day, Howell hit a walk–off grand slam against the Gastonia Baseball Club. In 73 games for Lexington, he hit .276/.370/.497 with 14 home runs, 37 RBI, and 31 stolen bases. Howell became a free agent following the season.

=== Cleburne Railroaders ===
On March 13, 2025, Howell signed with the Cleburne Railroaders of the American Association of Professional Baseball. In 45 appearances for Cleburne, he batted .217/.329/.427 with six home runs, 19 RBI, and eight stolen bases. Howell was released by the Railroaders following the signing of Jordan Viars on August 9.

=== Gary SouthShore RailCats ===
On February 5, 2026, Howell signed with the Gary SouthShore RailCats of the American Association of Professional Baseball.
