= Alek Jacob =

American baseball player (born 1998)

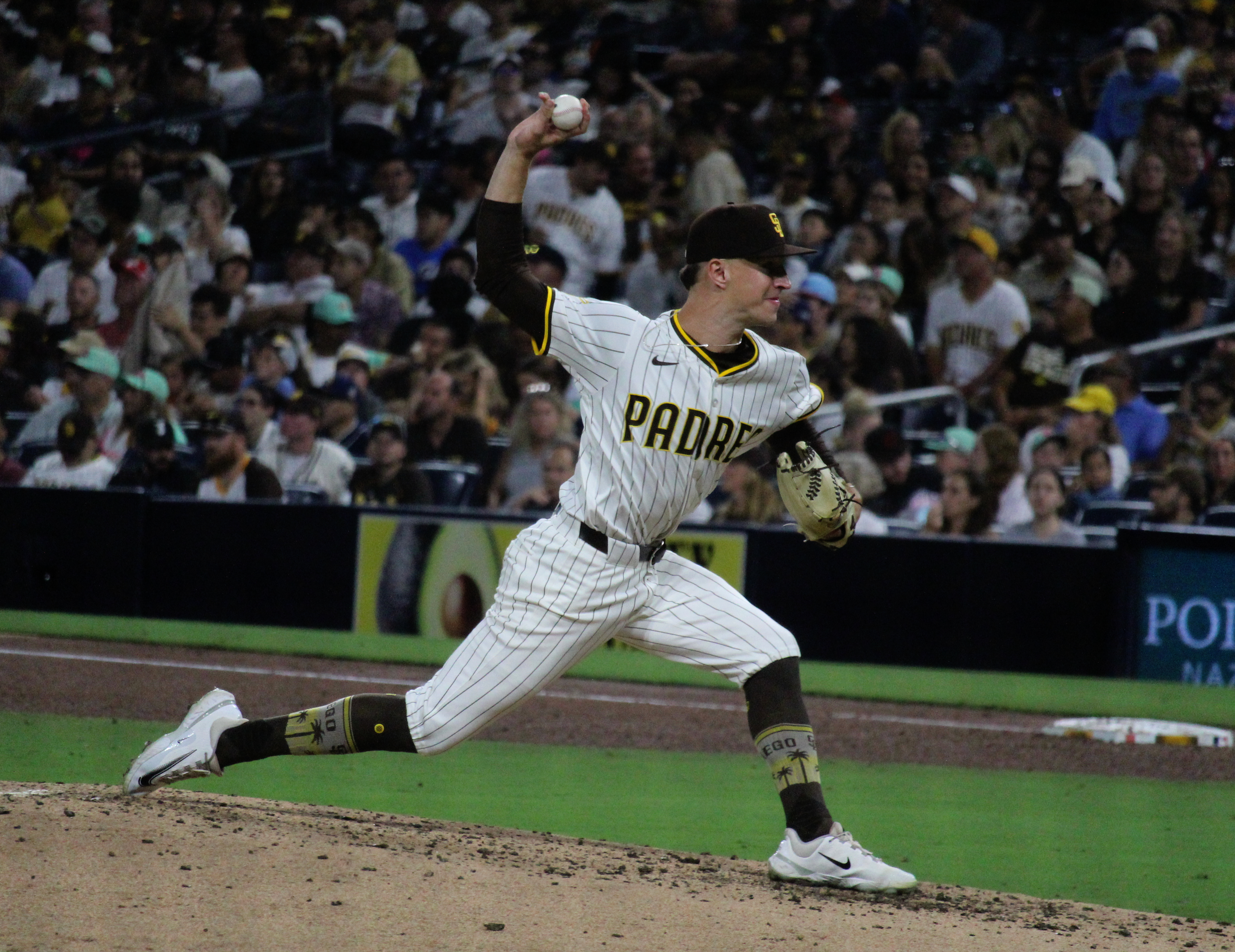
- Jacob with the San Diego Padres in 2025

San Diego Padres
- Pitcher
- Born: June 16, 1998 (age 28); Spokane, Washington, U.S.
- Bats: Left Throws: Right

MLB debut
- July 15, 2023, for the San Diego Padres

MLB statistics (through 2025 season)
- Win–loss record: 1–0
- Earned run average: 4.06
- Strikeouts: 47
- Stats at Baseball Reference

Teams
- San Diego Padres (2023–2026)

Alek Scott Jacob (born June 16, 1998) is an American professional baseball pitcher in the San Diego Padres organization. He made his Major League Baseball (MLB) debut in 2023.

== Amateur career ==
Jacob grew up in Spokane, Washington, and attended North Central High School.

Jacob attended Gonzaga University and played college baseball for the Gonzaga Bulldogs. He was named to the West Coast Conference All-Freshman team. As a senior, Jacob was named the West Coast Conference Pitcher of the Year after pitching to a 8–1 win–loss record with three saves, a 2.52 earned run average (ERA), and 112 strikeouts in 85 2/3 innings pitched over 17 appearances with 11 games started.

== Professional career ==
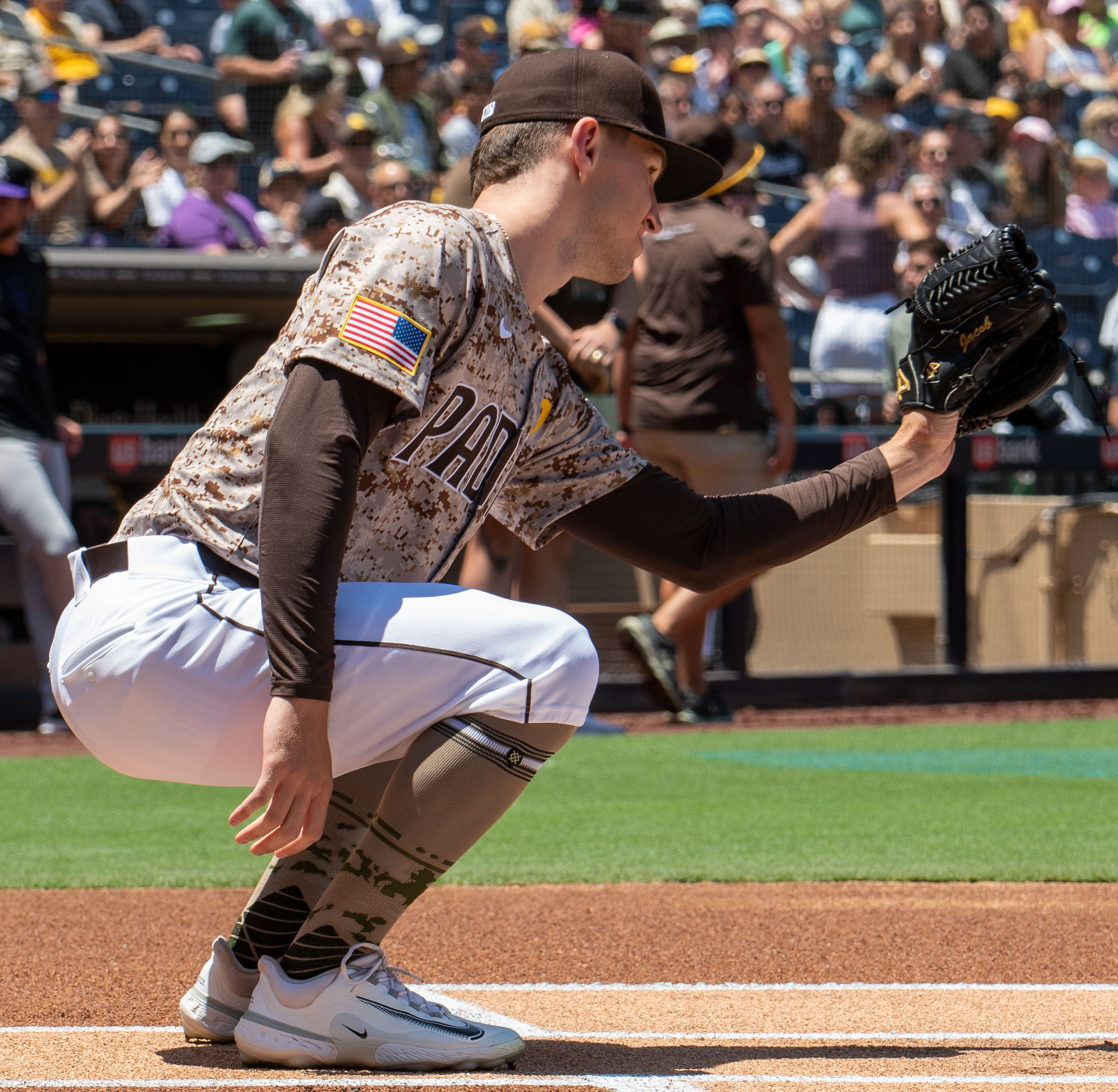
Jacob catches a ceremonial first pitch before a game at Petco Park in 2024

The San Diego Padres selected Jacob in the 16th round of the 2021 Major League Baseball draft. He was assigned to the Rookie-level Arizona Complex League Padres to start his professional career before being promoted to the Lake Elsinore Storm of Low-A West. Jacob began the 2022 season with the Fort Wayne TinCaps of the High-A Midwest League, where he won three games and surrendered no earned runs in four appearances before being promoted to the Double-A San Antonio Missions.

Jacob was assigned to the Double–A San Antonio Missions to begin the 2023 season, where he made 18 appearances and registered a 1.32 ERA with 32 strikeouts and 5 saves in 27 1/3 innings pitched. On July 7, 2023, Jacob was selected to the 40-man roster and promoted to the major leagues for the first time. After three scoreless appearances, Jacob was placed on the injured list with right elbow inflammation on July 22. An MRI later revealed a minor flexor strain and minor UCL sprain in his right elbow, and he was transferred to the 60–day injured list on September 8.

Jacob was optioned to the Triple–A El Paso Chihuahuas to begin the 2024 season. He made seven appearances for San Diego during the regular season, recording a 2.45 ERA with 19 strikeouts across 14 2/3 innings pitched. In 2025, Jacob made 29 appearances out of the bullpen for the Padres, compiling a 1-0 record and 5.13 ERA with 23 strikeouts across 33 1/3 innings pitched.

Jacob was optioned to Triple-A El Paso to begin the 2026 season. He struggled to a 5.40 ERA through three appearances and was designated for assignment on September 23.
