= Enyel De Los Santos =

Dominican baseball player (born 1995)

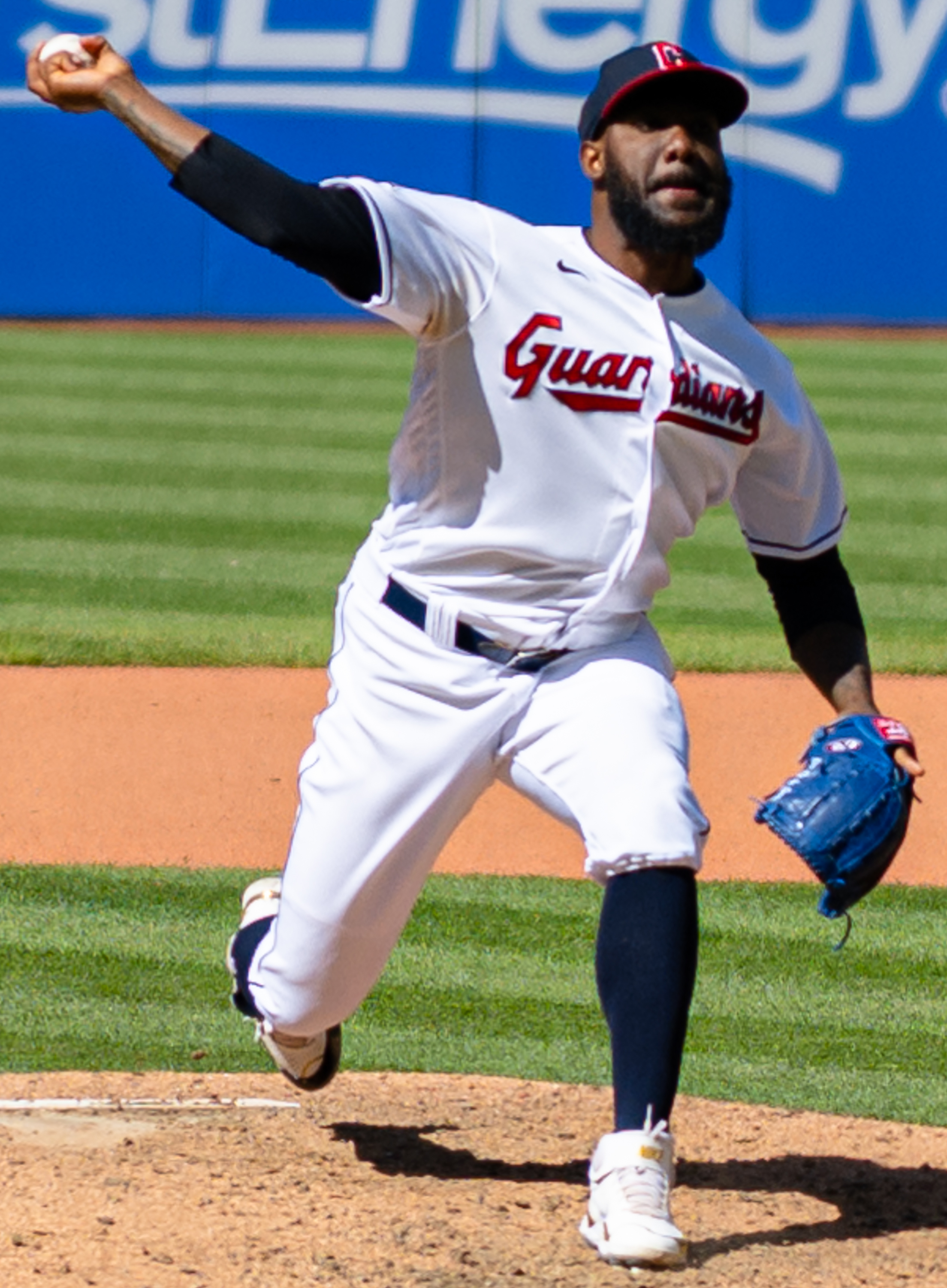
- De Los Santos with the Guardians in 2022

Free agent
- Pitcher
- Born: December 25, 1995 (age 30); San Pedro de Macoris, Dominican Republic
- Bats: Right Throws: Right

MLB debut
- July 10, 2018, for the Philadelphia Phillies

MLB statistics (through 2026 season)
- Win–loss record: 23–12
- Earned run average: 4.50
- Strikeouts: 390
- Stats at Baseball Reference

Teams
- Philadelphia Phillies (2018–2019, 2021); Pittsburgh Pirates (2021); Cleveland Guardians (2022–2023); San Diego Padres (2024); New York Yankees (2024); Chicago White Sox (2024); Atlanta Braves (2025); Houston Astros (2025–2026)

Career highlights and awards
- Pitched an immaculate inning on September 27, 2022; Pitched the first ever 2-pitch inning on August 16, 2025

Enyel De Los Santos Polanco (born December 25, 1995) is a Dominican professional baseball pitcher who is a free agent. He has played in Major League Baseball (MLB) for the Philadelphia Phillies, Pittsburgh Pirates, Cleveland Guardians, San Diego Padres, New York Yankees, Chicago White Sox, Atlanta Braves, and Houston Astros. De Los Santos signed with the Seattle Mariners as an international free agent in 2014 and made his MLB debut with the Phillies in 2018.

== Early life ==
De Los Santos was born in San Pedro de Macorís, in the Dominican Republic. He attended Liceo Gastón Fernández de Lino.

== Career ==
=== Seattle Mariners ===
The Seattle Mariners signed De Los Santos as an international free agent on July 17, 2014. De Los Santos made his professional debut in 2015, and spent the season with both the Arizona League Mariners and Everett AquaSox, posting a combined 6–0 record and 3.47 ERA with 71 strikeouts in 62 1/3 innings between both teams.

=== San Diego Padres ===
On November 12, 2015, the Mariners traded De Los Santos and Nelson Ward to the San Diego Padres in exchange for Joaquín Benoit. The Padres assigned De Los Santos to the Single–A Fort Wayne TinCaps to begin the 2016 season. After pitching to a 3–2 record and 2.91 ERA in 11 games (seven starts), he was promoted to the High–A Lake Elsinore Storm, where he finished the season, going 5–3 with a 4.35 ERA in 15 games started, and was a Midwest League All Star.

In 2017, De Los Santos pitched for the San Antonio Missions of the Double–A Texas League, where he went 10–6 with a 3.78 ERA (8th in the league) and a 1.19 WHIP (5th) in 26 games (24 starts), with 138 strikeouts (3rd in the league) in 150 innings. He was the Texas League Pitcher of the Week on both April 16 and August 13.

=== Philadelphia Phillies ===
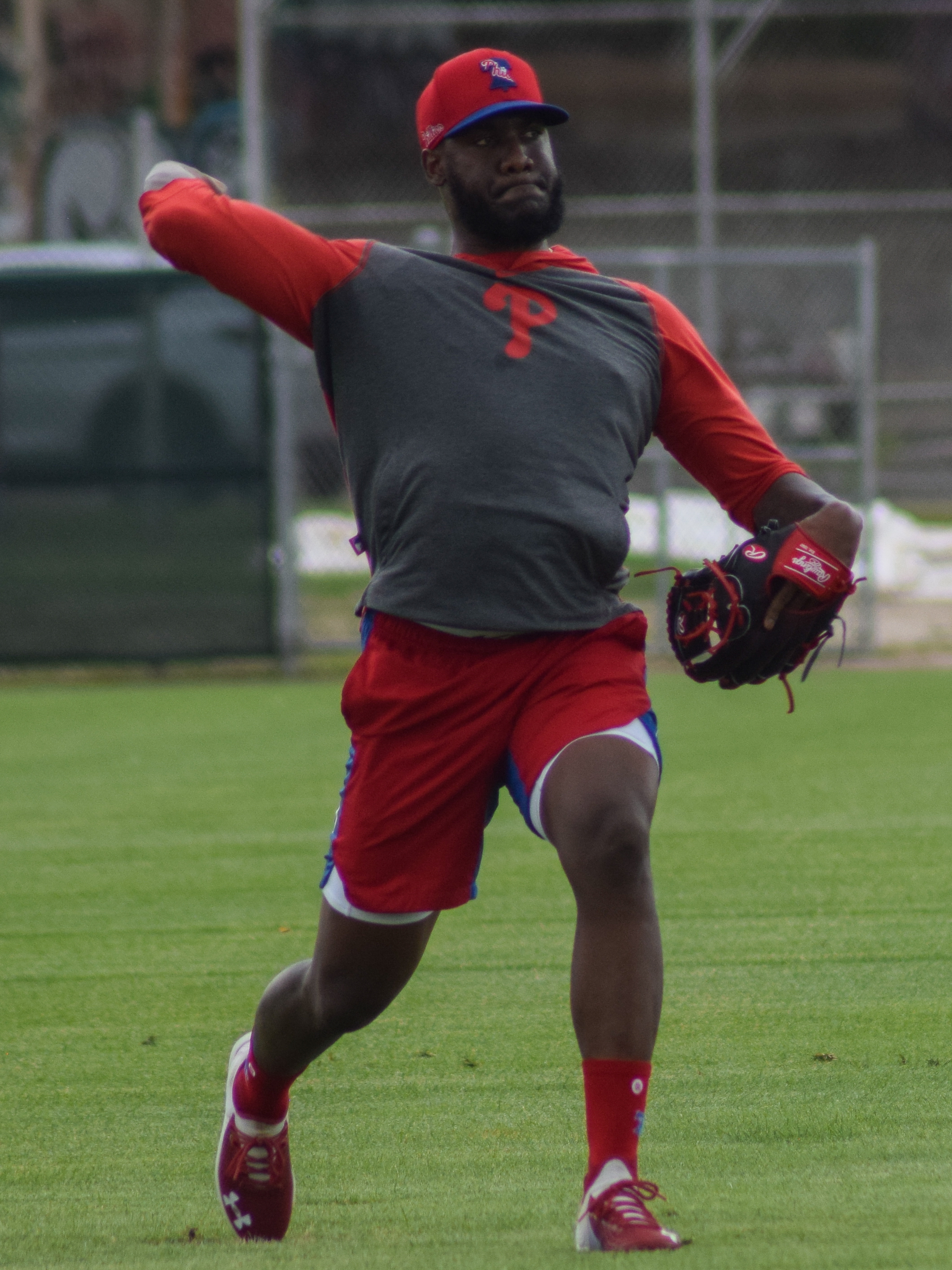
De Los Santos with the Philadelphia Phillies in 2020

On December 15, 2017, the Padres traded De Los Santos to the Philadelphia Phillies in exchange for Freddy Galvis. He began the 2018 season with the Lehigh Valley IronPigs of the Triple–A International League. He was the Phillies Minor League Co-Pitcher of the Month for April. De Los Santos was selected to represent the Phillies at the 2018 All-Star Futures Game. He was also elected to the Triple–A All Star Game. With Lehigh Valley in 2018 he was 10–5 with a 2.63 ERA (2nd in the International League), with 110 strikeouts in 126 2/3 innings, a WHIP of 1.16 (2nd), and an opponents batting average of .226 (3rd).

The Phillies promoted De Los Santos to the major leagues for the first time on July 10, 2018. He made his debut the same day, earning the win after allowing three runs and striking out 6 batters over 6 1/3 innings in a spot start against the New York Mets, and was optioned back to the IronPigs after the game. Coincidentally, the starting pitcher for the Mets in that game was Drew Gagnon, who was also making his Major League debut. In 2018 with the Phillies, he was 1–0 with a 4.74 ERA with 15 strikeouts in 19 innings.

In 2019 with Lehigh Valley, De Los Santos went 5–7 with a 4.40 ERA in 94 2/3 innings over 19 starts. In 2019 with the Phillies he was 0–1 with a 7.36 ERA in 11 innings over five games (one start). When rosters for the COVID-19 pandemic-shorted 2020 season were reduced, he was sent to Lehigh Valley. De Los Santos was designated for assignment on August 9, 2020. On August 15, he was sent outright to Triple-A. De Los Santos did not appear for the organization in 2020 due to the cancellation of the minor league season because of the COVID-19 pandemic.

On May 4, 2021, De Los Santos had his contract selected back to the active roster. De Los Santos pitched 28 innings for the Phillies, posting a 6.75 ERA. On September 12, the Phillies designated De Los Santos for assignment once more.

=== Pittsburgh Pirates ===
A day after De Los Santos was designated for assigned by the Phillies, he was claimed off waivers by the Pittsburgh Pirates. In 7 games for Pittsburgh, he logged a 4.91 ERA with 6 strikeouts over 7 1/3 innings of work. On November 5, 2021, the Pirates outrighted De Los Santos to Triple-A Indianapolis, removing him from their 40-man roster. De Los Santos refused the minor league assignment and elected free agency two days later.

=== Cleveland Guardians ===
On December 1, 2021, De Los Santos signed a minor league contract with an invitation to spring training with the Cleveland Guardians. He did not make the Opening Day roster. After beginning the 2022 season with the Triple–A Columbus Clippers, the Guardians selected De Los Santos' contract as a COVID-19 replacement player on April 20. De Los Santos was returned to the minor leagues on May 8. The Guardians selected De Los Santos' contract once more on May 9. On September 27, De Los Santos pitched an immaculate inning against the Tampa Bay Rays by striking out Christian Bethancourt, Jose Siri, and Taylor Walls on nine pitches.

In 2022, De Los Santos was 5–0 with a 3.04 ERA in 53 1/3 innings, with a 1.069 WHIP. In 2023, De Los Santos made 70 appearances out of the bullpen for the Guardians, registering a 3.29 ERA with 62 strikeouts across 65 2/3 innings of work.

=== San Diego Padres (second stint) ===
On November 17, 2023, the Guardians traded De Los Santos to the Padres in exchange for Scott Barlow. In 44 appearances for San Diego in 2024, De Los Santos compiled a 4.46 ERA with 48 strikeouts across 40 1/3 innings pitched.

=== New York Yankees ===
On July 30, 2024, the Padres traded De Los Santos and Thomas Balboni Jr. to the New York Yankees in exchange for Brandon Lockridge. In 5 games for the Yankees, he struggled to a 14.21 ERA with 5 strikeouts across 6 1/3 innings pitched. On August 14, De Los Santos was designated for assignment by the Yankees.

=== Chicago White Sox ===
On August 17, 2024, De Los Santos was claimed off waivers by the Chicago White Sox. In 15 appearances for Chicago, he compiled a 3.63 ERA with 13 strikeouts across 17 1/3 innings pitched. On November 22, the White Sox non–tendered De Los Santos, making him a free agent.

=== Atlanta Braves ===
On December 15, 2024, De Los Santos signed a minor league contract with the Atlanta Braves. On March 21, 2025, the Braves selected De Los Santos' contract after he made the team's Opening Day roster. In 43 appearances for Atlanta, he compiled a 4.53 ERA with 38 strikeouts across 43 2/3 innings pitched. On July 30, De Los Santos was designated for assignment by the Braves following the team's acquisition of Tyler Kinley. He cleared waivers and was sent outright to the Triple–A Gwinnett Stripers on August 4, but elected free agency rather than accepting the assignment.

=== Houston Astros ===
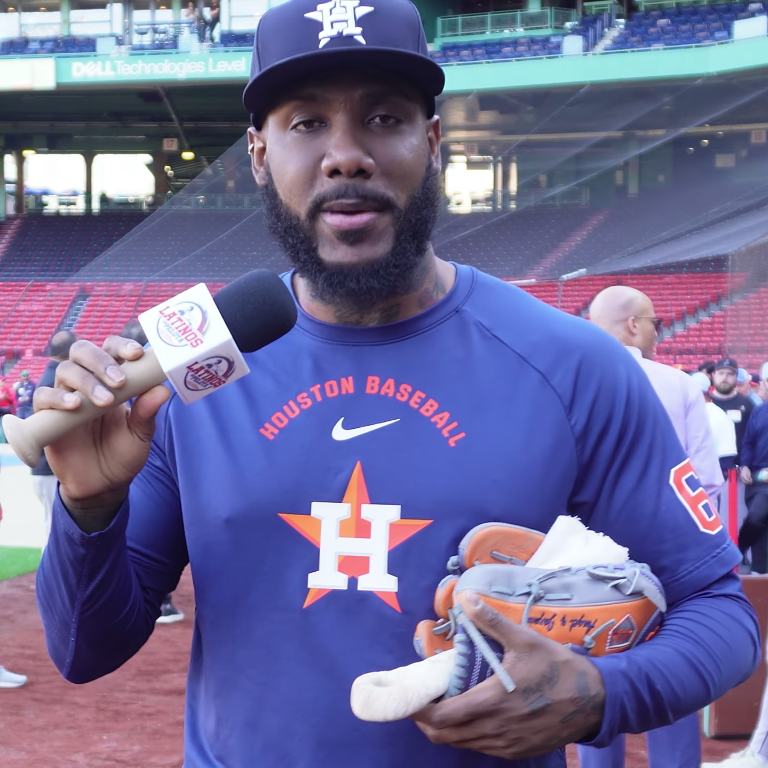
De Los Santos with the Houston Astros in 2026

On August 7, 2025, De Los Santos signed a major league contract with the Houston Astros. During the eleventh inning on August 16, De Los Santos recorded the first-ever two-pitch, three-out, inning. Ryan Mountcastle flew out on the first offering. On the next pitch, Dylan Beavers lined out to second baseman Ramón Urías, who threw to Carlos Correa at third base to tag the automatic runner, Luis Vázquez, and complete the double play.

De Los Santos and the Astros agreed on a $1.6 million salary for the 2026 season, avoiding salary arbitration.
