= Adam Mazur =

American baseball player (born 2001)

Miami Marlins – No. 60
- Pitcher
- Born: April 20, 2001 (age 25); Saint Paul, Minnesota, U.S.
- Bats: Right Throws: Right

MLB debut
- June 4, 2024, for the San Diego Padres

MLB statistics (through 2025 season)
- Win–loss record: 1–7
- Earned run average: 6.22
- Strikeouts: 41
- Stats at Baseball Reference

Teams
- San Diego Padres (2024); Miami Marlins (2025)

Adam McKinnlee Mazur (born April 20, 2001) is an American professional baseball pitcher for the Miami Marlins of Major League Baseball (MLB). He has previously played in MLB for the San Diego Padres.

== Early life and amateur career ==
Mazur grew up in Woodbury, Minnesota and attended Woodbury High School. He was named All-Metro by the Star Tribune as a senior after posting an 8–2 record with a 0.50 ERA and 112 strikeouts in 72 innings pitched.

Mazur began his college baseball career at South Dakota State. He went 2–7 with a 5.43 ERA and 88 strikeouts in 12 starts during his sophomore season. After the season, Mazur transferred to Iowa. During the summer of 2021, he played collegiate summer baseball for the Wareham Gatemen of the Cape Cod Baseball League. Mazur was named the Hawkeyes Friday night starter going into his first season with the team. Mazur was named the Big Ten Conference Pitcher of the Year at the end of the season.

== Professional career ==
=== San Diego Padres ===
The San Diego Padres selected Mazur 53rd overall in the 2022 Major League Baseball draft. He signed with the team and received a $1.25 million signing bonus. In 2023, Mazur split his first professional season between the High–A Fort Wayne TinCaps and Double–A San Antonio Missions. He made 24 appearances (18 starts) for the two affiliates, accumulating a 6–4 record and 2.81 ERA with 90 strikeouts across 96 innings pitched.

Mazur began the 2024 season with San Antonio, recording a 1.95 ERA across 6 starts. He was later promoted to the Triple–A El Paso Chihuahuas, compiling a 7.11 ERA with 18 strikeouts across 4 starts. On June 3, 2024, Mazur was selected to the 40-man roster and promoted to the major leagues for the first time. He made his debut the next day. In 8 starts for San Diego, Mazur struggled to a 7.49 ERA with 22 strikeouts across 33 2/3 innings pitched.

=== Miami Marlins ===
On July 30, 2024, the Padres traded Mazur, Graham Pauley, Robby Snelling, and Jay Beshears to the Miami Marlins in exchange for Bryan Hoeing and Tanner Scott. He made 8 starts for the Triple-A Jacksonville Jumbo Shrimp down the stretch, posting a 2-3 record and 5.21 ERA with 38 strikeouts across 38 innings pitched.

Mazur was optioned to Triple-A Jacksonville to begin the 2025 season. Mazur made six starts for Miami, compiling an 0-4 record and 4.80 ERA with 19 strikeouts over 30 innings of work.

On March 11, 2026, Mazur underwent Tommy John surgery, ruling him out for the entirety of the season.
