= Bryce Johnson (baseball) =

American baseball player (born 1995)

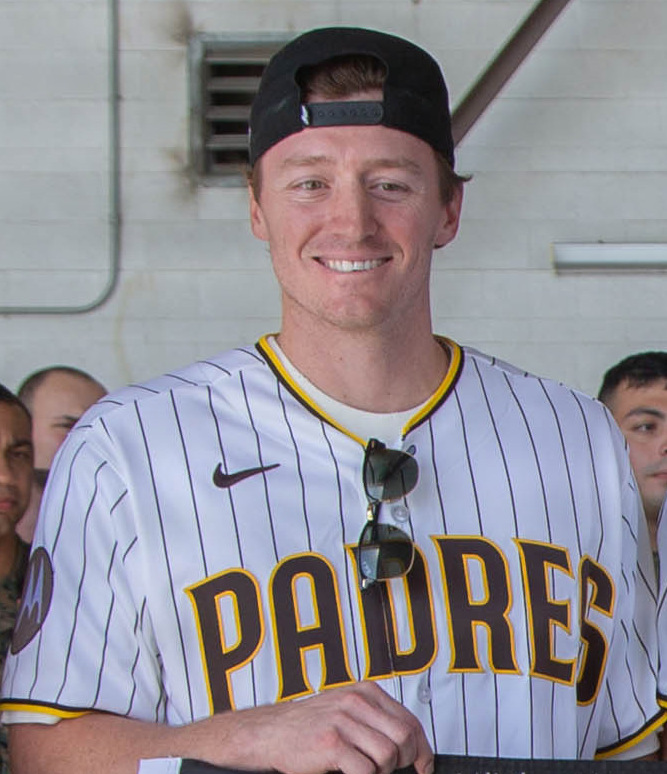
- Johnson with the San Diego Padres in 2026

Free agent
- Outfielder
- Born: October 27, 1995 (age 31); Cypress, Texas, U.S.
- Bats: Switch Throws: Right

MLB debut
- August 3, 2022, for the San Francisco Giants

MLB statistics (through 2026 season)
- Batting average: .229
- Home runs: 2
- Runs batted in: 19
- Stats at Baseball Reference

Teams
- San Francisco Giants (2022–2023); San Diego Padres (2024–2026)

Bryce Christopher Johnson (born October 27, 1995) is an American professional baseball outfielder who is a free agent. He has previously played in Major League Baseball (MLB) for the San Francisco Giants and San Diego Padres. Johnson played college baseball at Sam Houston State University. The Giants selected Johnson in the sixth round of the 2017 MLB draft. In 2021, he led the Triple-A West in stolen bases.

== Early life ==
Johnson was born in Cypress, Texas. He attended Cypress Ranch High School. He played for the school's baseball team; MaxPreps named him to the 2013 Texas Class 5A All-District Baseball First Team. He also played for the school's football team, playing as a wide receiver in football; MaxPreps named him to the 2013 Texas 5A All-District Football First Team.

== College ==
Johnson attended Sam Houston State University in Huntsville, Texas, to play college baseball for the Sam Houston State Bearkats. In his freshman season in 2015 he batted .310/.392/.364 with 16 stolen bases (6th in the Southland Conference) in 21 attempts. He was named Southland Conference Honorable Mention.

He began switch-hitting in his sophomore year in college to take advantage of his speed. In Johnson's sophomore season in 2016 he batted .345(8th in the Conference)/.401/.418 in 261 at bats, with 51 runs (5th), 8 sacrifice hits (9th), and 20 stolen bases (2nd) in 27 attempts, and his 90 hits ranked 20th in the nation as well as first in the Conference. He was named Second-Team All-Southland Conference. In 2016, he played collegiate summer baseball with the Falmouth Commodores of the Cape Cod Baseball League.

In his junior season in 2017 with Sam Houston State he batted .350(5th in the Conference)/.453(5th)/.434 in 263 at bats, with 63 runs (2nd), 5 triples (leading the conference), 34 walks (10th), 17 hit by pitch (3rd), and 33 stolen bases (2nd) in 40 attempts. The San Francisco Giants selected Johnson in the sixth round of the 2017 MLB draft, and he signed for a signing bonus of $210,000.

== Professional career ==
=== San Francisco Giants ===
In 2017 with the Low-A Salem-Keizer Volcanoes he batted .329(3rd in the Northwest League)/.400(6th)/.369 in 222 at bats, and 10 hit by pitch (2nd), with 25 stolen bases (4th) in 35 attempts. He played 43 games in left field, 15 in center field, and one in right field, and had 8 assists and a 1.000 fielding percentage. He was named an NWL post-season All Star.

In 2018 with the High-A San Jose Giants, he batted .249/.339/.324 in 441 at bats, with 54 walks (6th in the California League), 7 sacrifice hits (4th), and 31 stolen bases (3rd) in 35 attempts. He played all 112 games in center field, had 7 assists, and had a 1.000 fielding percentage. He received the MiLB Gold Glove Award.

In 2019 with the Double-A Richmond Flying Squirrels and the San Jose Giants, in aggregate he batted .255/.346/.366 in 470 at bats with 26 steals. He played 73 games in right field, 43 games in center field, and six games in left field. Johnson did not play in a game in 2020 due to the cancellation of the minor league season because of the COVID-19 pandemic.

In 2021 with the Triple-A Sacramento River Cats in the Triple-A West he batted .286/.377/.433 in 363 at bats. He scored 65 runs, with 5 triples (9th in the league), 9 home runs, 44 RBIs, 48 walks (9th in the league), 108 strikeouts (4th in the league), and 30 stolen bases (leading the league) in 34 attempts. He played 56 games in center field, 14 games in right field, and 12 games in left field.

In 2022, with Triple-A Sacramento he batted .290/.369/.401 in 307 at bats, with 41 runs, four triples, five home runs, and 36 RBIs, as he stole 31 bases (6th in the PCL) in 36 attempts. He played 67 games in center field, 15 in left field, nine in right field, and two at DH. The Giants promoted Johnson to the major leagues for the first time on August 3. On September 4, Johnson recorded his first career hit, a single off of Philadelphia Phillies starter Ranger Suárez. With the Giants, Johnson went 2-for-19 (.111) with 2 RBI. At the time of his call-up, he was batting .283 in 237 at bats with five home runs, three triples, seven hit by pitch (7th in the Pacific Coast League), and 31 stolen bases (6th) in 36 attempts in Triple A in 2022. On November 9, 2022, Johnson was removed from the 40-man roster and sent outright to Triple-A.

The Giants assigned Johnson to Sacramento to begin the 2023 season. On April 1, 2023, Johnson was selected to the active roster. On April 3, Johnson hit his first career home run off of Chicago White Sox reliever José Ruiz. In 30 games for the Giants, he batted .163/.229/.256 with one home run, 3 RBI, and 3 stolen bases. On August 29, Johnson was designated for assignment following Mitch Haniger's activation from the injured list. He cleared waivers and was sent outright to Triple–A Sacramento on September 3. On October 2, Johnson elected free agency.

=== San Diego Padres ===
On December 21, 2023, Johnson signed a minor league contract with the San Diego Padres. In 61 games for the Triple–A El Paso Chihuahuas, he batted .301/.430/.461 with three home runs, 28 RBI, and 18 stolen bases. On June 24, 2024, the Padres selected Johnson's contract, adding him to their active roster. In 47 games for San Diego, he slashed .206/.286/.238 with four RBI and one stolen base. On November 22, the Padres non–tendered Johnson, making him a free agent.

=== Pittsburgh Pirates ===
On January 6, 2025, Johnson signed a minor league contract with the Pittsburgh Pirates. In nine games for the Triple-A Indianapolis Indians, Johnson went 2-for-25 (.080) with one RBI and one stolen base.

=== San Diego Padres (second stint) ===
On April 16, 2025, Johnson was traded to the San Diego Padres in exchange for Brett Sullivan. In 42 appearances for the Triple-A El Paso Chihuahuas, he slashed .303/.407/.458 with three home runs, 22 RBI, and 10 stolen bases. On June 16, the Padres selected Johnson's contract, adding him to their active roster. In 55 games with San Diego, he slashed .342/.383/.434, with eight RBI and four stolen bases. Johnson also doubled his hit count from 2024, going from 13 to 26.

Johnson made 32 appearances for San Diego in 2026, batting .178/.229/.222 with two RBI and five stolen bases. Johnson was designated for assignment by the Padres on June 12, 2026. He cleared waivers and was sent outright to Triple-A El Paso on June 15. He elected free agency on November 2.
