= Brett Sullivan (baseball) =

American baseball player (born 1994)

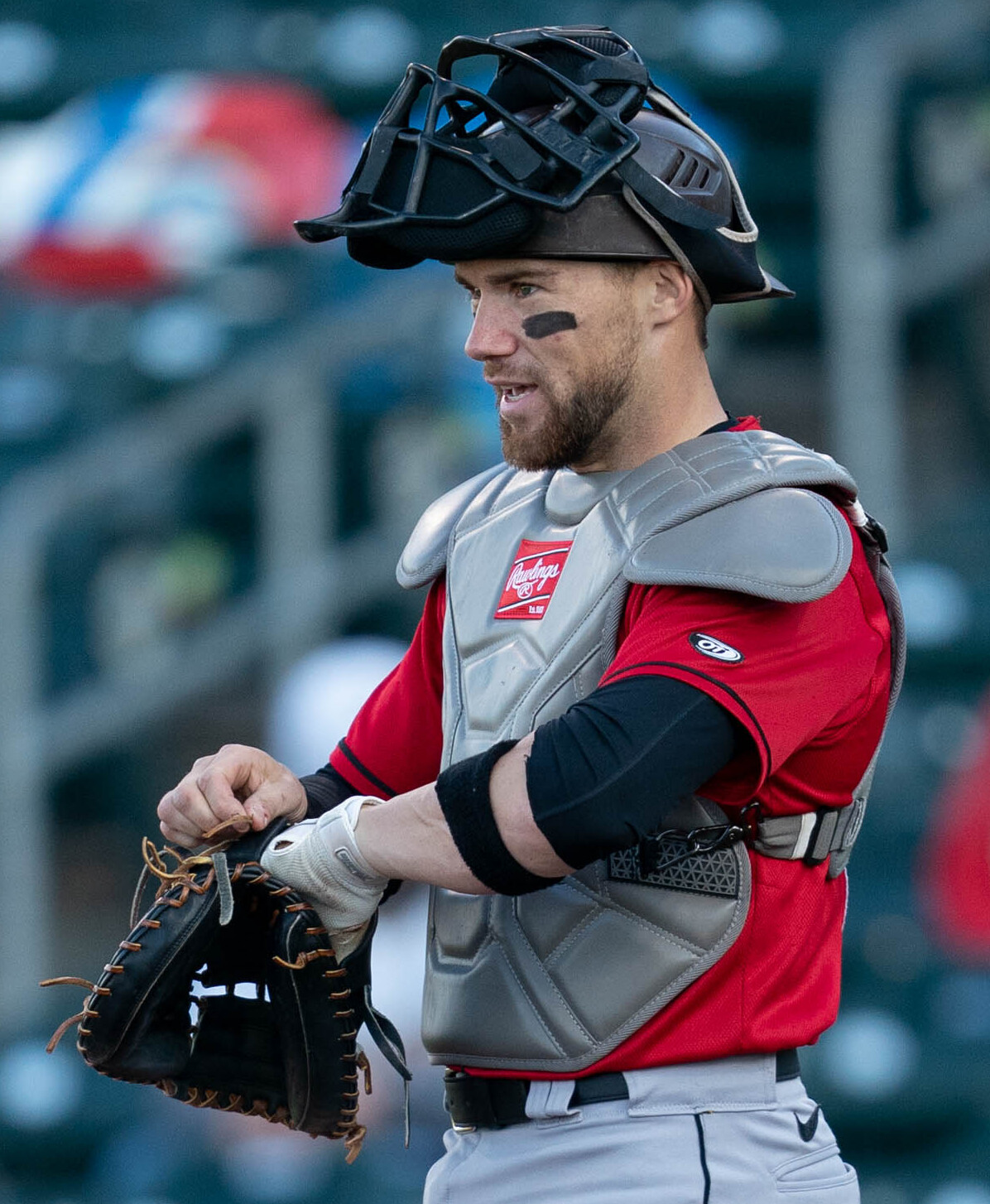
- Sullivan with the Indianapolis Indians in 2025

Colorado Rockies – No. 26
- Catcher
- Born: February 22, 1994 (age 32); Stockton, California, U.S.
- Bats: Left Throws: Right

MLB debut
- April 18, 2023, for the San Diego Padres

MLB statistics (through September 24, 2026)
- Batting average: .220
- Home runs: 9
- Runs batted in: 43
- Stats at Baseball Reference

Teams
- San Diego Padres (2023–2024); Pittsburgh Pirates (2025); Colorado Rockies (2026–present)

Brett Charles Sullivan (born February 22, 1994) is an American professional baseball catcher for the Colorado Rockies of Major League Baseball (MLB). He has previously played in MLB for the San Diego Padres and Pittsburgh Pirates.

== Career ==
=== Amateur career ===
Sullivan attended Lincoln High School in Stockton, California, and the University of the Pacific, where he played college baseball for the Pacific Tigers. In 2014, he played collegiate summer baseball with the Bourne Braves of the Cape Cod Baseball League.

=== Tampa Bay Rays ===
The Tampa Bay Rays selected Sullivan in the 17th round, with the 508th overall selection, of the 2015 Major League Baseball draft. He played in 65 games for the rookie-level Princeton Rays in his first professional campaign. He spent the 2016 season with the Single-A Bowling Green Hot Rods, posting a .283/.314/.438 slash line with 13 home runs, 81 RBI, and 17 stolen bases in 118 games for the team. In 2017, Sullivan split the year between the High-A Charlotte Stone Crabs and Double-A Montgomery Biscuits, hitting a cumulative .294/.324/.433 with 8 home runs, 74 RBI, and 18 stolen bases in 107 games.

Sullivan played in 111 games for Montgomery in 2018, batting .266/.322/.380 with 7 home runs, 65 RBI, and 17 stolen bases. He returned to Montgomery for a third season in 2019. On June 6, 2019, Sullivan hit for the cycle in a game against the Tennessee Smokies. He finished the year playing in 102 games, hitting .280/.333/.459 with 10 home runs, 51 RBI, and a career-high 21 stolen bases.

Sullivan did not play in a minor league game in 2020 due to the cancellation of the minor league season because of the COVID-19 pandemic. He spent the 2021 season with the Triple-A Durham Bulls, playing in 90 games and batting .223/.302/.375 with 9 home runs, 35 RBI, and 7 stolen bases. He elected free agency following the season on November 7, 2021.

=== San Diego Padres ===
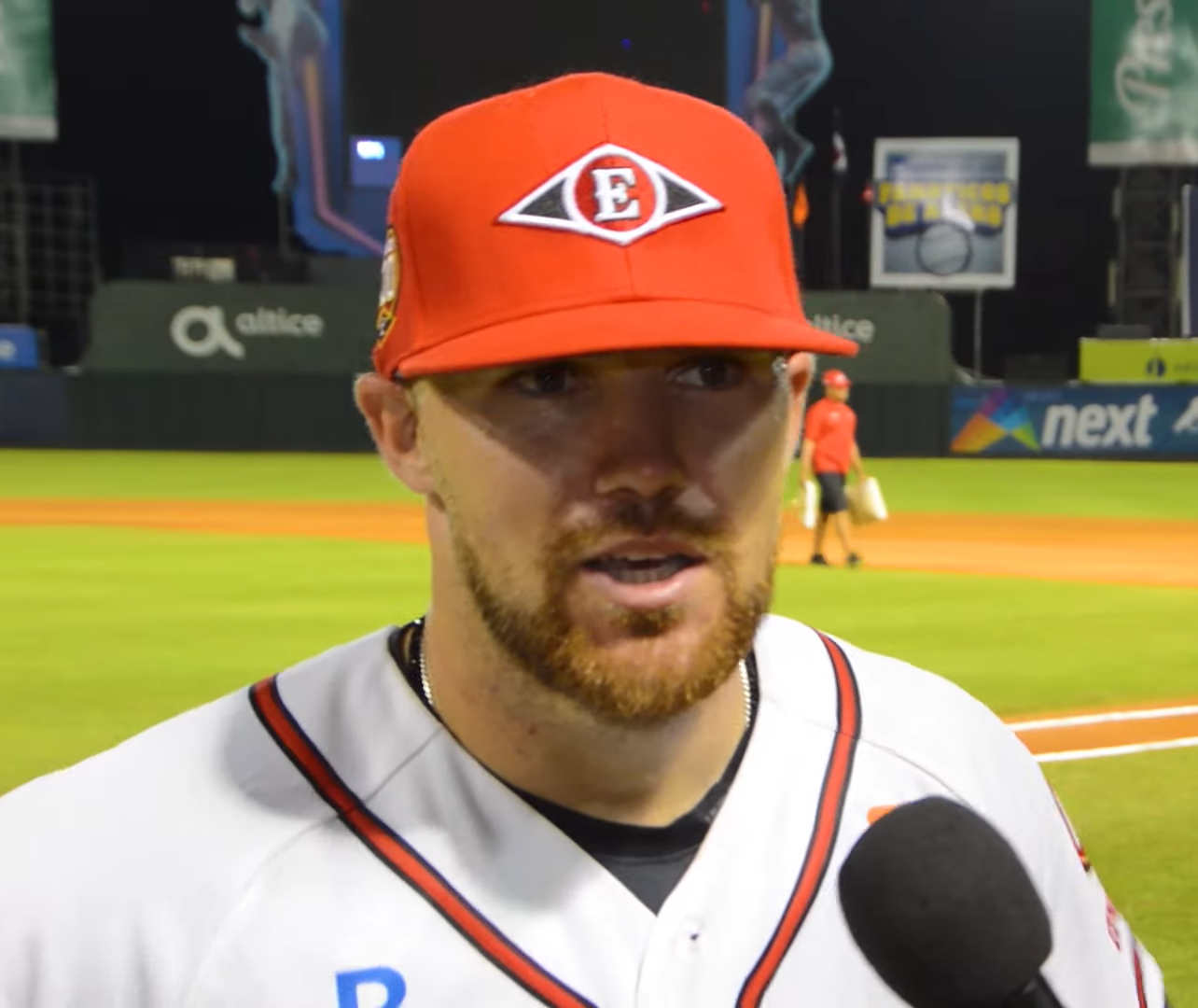
Sullivan with the Leones del Escogido in 2021

On December 1, 2021, Sullivan signed a major league deal with the Milwaukee Brewers. On April 6, 2022, the Brewers traded Sullivan and Korry Howell to the San Diego Padres in exchange for Víctor Caratini. He spent the season with the Triple-A El Paso Chihuahuas, hitting .285/.339/.444 with 9 home runs and 81 RBI (tying a career-high) in 113 games. He was assigned to El Paso to begin the 2023 season.

On April 16, 2023, Sullivan was promoted to the major leagues for the first time after Luis Campusano suffered a left thumb sprain. He made his MLB debut on April 18 as the starting catcher in a game against the Atlanta Braves. In 33 games during his rookie campaign, Sullivan batted .210/.244/.284 with one home run and six RBI.

Sullivan was optioned to Triple–A El Paso to begin the 2024 season. On April 16, 2024, Sullivan was recalled to the active roster. In 7 games for the Padres, he went 3-for-16 (.188) with 1 home run, 2 RBI, and 1 walk.

Sullivan was designated for assignment by the Padres on March 22, 2025. He cleared waivers and was sent outright to Triple-A El Paso on March 26.

=== Pittsburgh Pirates ===
On April 16, 2025, Sullivan was traded to the Pittsburgh Pirates in exchange for Bryce Johnson. In 20 appearances for the Triple-A Indianapolis Indians, he batted .211/.250/.324 with one home run, 10 RBI, and two stolen bases. On June 7, the Pirates selected Sullivan's contract after Endy Rodríguez was placed on the injured list. In three appearances for Pittsburgh, he went 1-for-6 (.167) with two RBI and one walk. Sullivan was designated for assignment by the Pirates on June 16. He elected free agency after clearing waivers on June 19. Sullivan re-signed with Pittsburgh on a minor league contract the following day. He elected free agency following the season on November 6.

=== Colorado Rockies ===
On December 18, 2025, Sullivan signed a minor league contract with the Colorado Rockies. On March 25, 2026, the Rockies selected Sullivan's contract after he made the team's Opening Day roster. On May 31, during a 19–6 blowout loss to the San Francisco Giants, he recorded his first career pitching strikeout against Rafael Devers. On June 11, Sullivan had his first career multi–homer game against the Chicago Cubs, homering twice as part of a three–hit, two RBI performance.

== International career ==
Sullivan played for the Italy national baseball team in the 2023 World Baseball Classic.

== Personal life ==
Sullivan's older brother, Tyler, played baseball with Brett at Lincoln High and Pacific.
