= Brandon Lockridge =

American baseball player (born 1997)

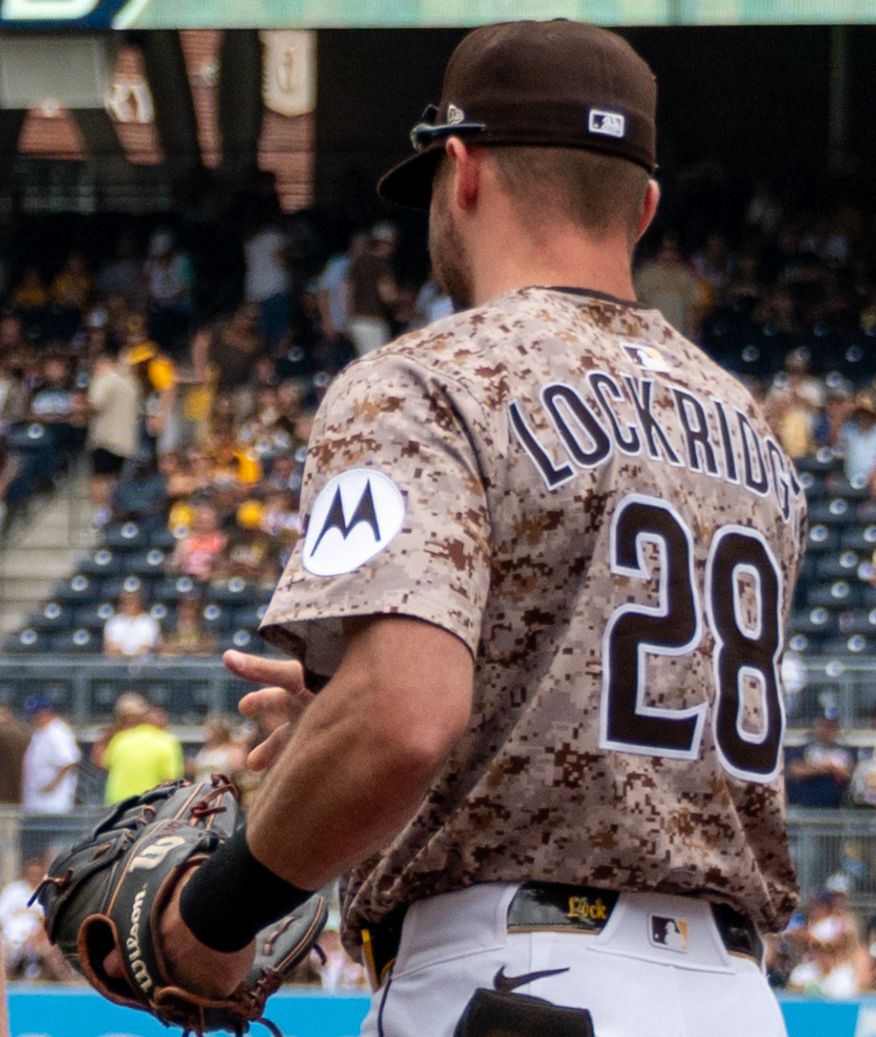
- Lockridge with the San Diego Padres in 2025

Milwaukee Brewers – No. 20
- Outfielder
- Born: March 14, 1997 (age 29); Pensacola, Florida, U.S.
- Bats: Right Throws: Right

MLB debut
- September 13, 2024, for the San Diego Padres

MLB statistics (through 2026 season)
- Batting average: .247
- Home runs: 1
- Runs batted in: 24
- Stats at Baseball Reference

Teams
- San Diego Padres (2024–2025); Milwaukee Brewers (2025–present)

Brandon Marcus Lockridge (born March 14, 1997) is an American professional baseball outfielder for the Milwaukee Brewers of Major League Baseball (MLB). He has previously played in MLB for the San Diego Padres.

== Amateur career ==
A native of Pensacola, Florida, Lockridge attended Pensacola Catholic High School and Troy University, where he played college baseball for the Troy Trojans. In 2017, he played collegiate summer baseball with the Wareham Gatemen of the Cape Cod Baseball League.

== Professional career ==
=== New York Yankees ===
The New York Yankees selected Lockridge in the fifth round, with the 157th overall selection, of the 2018 Major League Baseball draft. He made his professional debut with the rookie-level Gulf Coast League Yankees before being promoted to the Low-A Staten Island Yankees. He spent 2019 with the Single-A Charleston RiverDogs, hitting .251/.320/.410 with 12 home runs, 56 RBI, and 22 stolen bases across 121 games. Lockridge did not play in a game in 2020 due to the cancellation of the minor league season because of the COVID-19 pandemic. Lockridge started 2021 with the High-A Hudson Valley Renegades before being promoted to the Double-A Somerset Patriots. In 75 games for the two affiliates, he accumulated a .298/.352/.495 batting line with 13 home runs, 46 RBI, and 18 stolen bases.

Lockridge spent the entirety of the 2022 season with Somerset, playing in 108 games and batting .230/.300/.378 with 14 home runs, 49 RBI, and 18 stolen bases. He split the 2023 campaign between Somerset and the Triple-A Scranton/Wilkes-Barre RailRiders. In 92 games for the two affiliates, Lockridge slashed .296/.379/.414 with three home runs, 28 RBI, and 40 stolen bases. He returned to Scranton to begin 2024, hitting .295/.405/.383 with no home runs, 32 RBI, and 34 stolen bases.

=== San Diego Padres ===
On July 30, 2024, the Yankees traded Lockridge to the San Diego Padres in exchange for Enyel De Los Santos and Thomas Balboni Jr. The Padres added Lockridge to their 40-man roster and optioned him to the Triple-A El Paso Chihuahuas on September 1 and promoted him to the major leagues on September 11.

Lockridge made the Padres' Opening Day roster for the 2025 season. In 47 appearances for San Diego, he batted .216/.258/.261 with five RBI and eight stolen bases.

=== Milwaukee Brewers ===
On July 31, 2025 the Padres traded Lockridge to the Milwaukee Brewers in exchange for Nestor Cortés Jr., Jorge Quintana, and cash considerations. He made 20 appearances down the stretch for Milwaukee, batting .261/.308/.370 with six RBI and two stolen bases.

On May 8, 2026, Lockridge was carted off during a game against the New York Yankees when he suffered a deep laceration in his right knee after colliding with an outfield wall. He was transferred to the 60-day injured list on July 7. Lockridge was activated from the injured list in August 1.
