= Jeremiah Estrada =

American baseball player (born 1998)

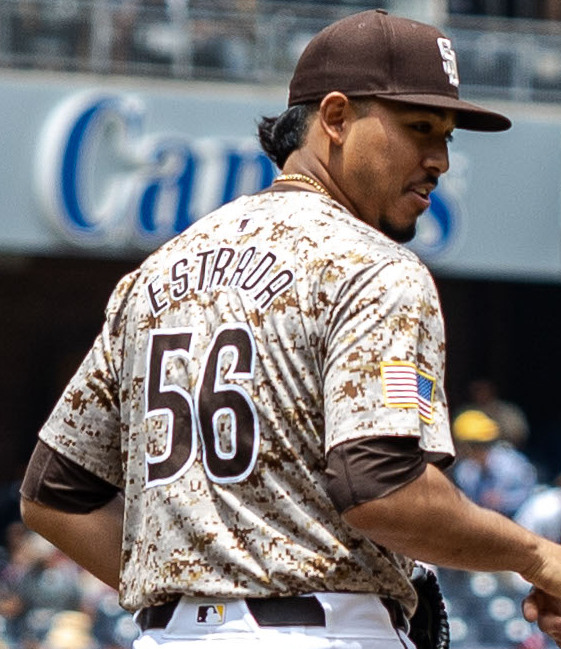
- Estrada with the San Diego Padres in 2024

San Diego Padres – No. 56
- Pitcher
- Born: November 1, 1998 (age 27); Rancho Mirage, California, U.S.
- Bats: Switch Throws: Right

MLB debut
- August 30, 2022, for the Chicago Cubs

MLB statistics (through 2026 season)
- Win–loss record: 12–11
- Earned run average: 3.47
- Strikeouts: 261
- Stats at Baseball Reference

Teams
- Chicago Cubs (2022–2023); San Diego Padres (2024–present)

Jeremiah Ramiro Estrada (born November 1, 1998) is an American professional baseball pitcher for the San Diego Padres of Major League Baseball (MLB). He has previously played in MLB for the Chicago Cubs.

== Career ==
=== Chicago Cubs ===
Estrada attended Palm Desert High School in Palm Desert, California. He was drafted by the Chicago Cubs in the sixth round of the 2017 Major League Baseball draft. He made his professional debut that year with the Arizona League Cubs. He did not pitch in 2018 due to injury and returned in 2019 to play for the Eugene Emeralds before suffering an injury which caused him to undergo Tommy John surgery.

Estrada did not play in a game in 2020 due to the cancellation of the minor league season because of the COVID-19 pandemic. He returned in 2021 to pitch for the Myrtle Beach Pelicans. He started 2022 with the South Bend Cubs and was promoted to the Double–A Tennessee Smokies and Triple–A Iowa Cubs during the season.

On August 30, 2022, Estrada was selected to the 40-man roster and promoted to the major leagues for the first time as a COVID-19 replacement player. Estrada made his MLB debut that night against the Toronto Blue Jays, striking out two in a scoreless innings of relief. He was removed from the roster and sent outright to Iowa the following day. On September 1, Estrada was selected back to the major league roster. In 5 appearances in his rookie campaign, he registered a 3.18 ERA with 8 strikeouts in 5 2/3 innings of work.

Estrada was optioned to Triple-A Iowa to begin the 2023 season. In 12 games for the Cubs, he struggled to a 6.75 ERA with 13 strikeouts across 10 2/3 innings pitched. Following the season on November 2, 2023, Estrada was removed from the 40–man roster and sent outright to Triple–A.

=== San Diego Padres ===
On November 6, 2023, Estrada was claimed off waivers by the San Diego Padres. From May 23 to 28, 2024, Estrada struck out 13 consecutive batters, setting an MLB record since the expansion era. He threw 53 consecutive pitches to those 13 batters, without a single ball being put in play, and without allowing a base runner. In 62 appearances in his first year with the Padres, he registered a 2.95 ERA with 94 strikeouts and only 1 save in 61 innings of work.
