= Jackson Merrill =

American baseball player (born 2003)

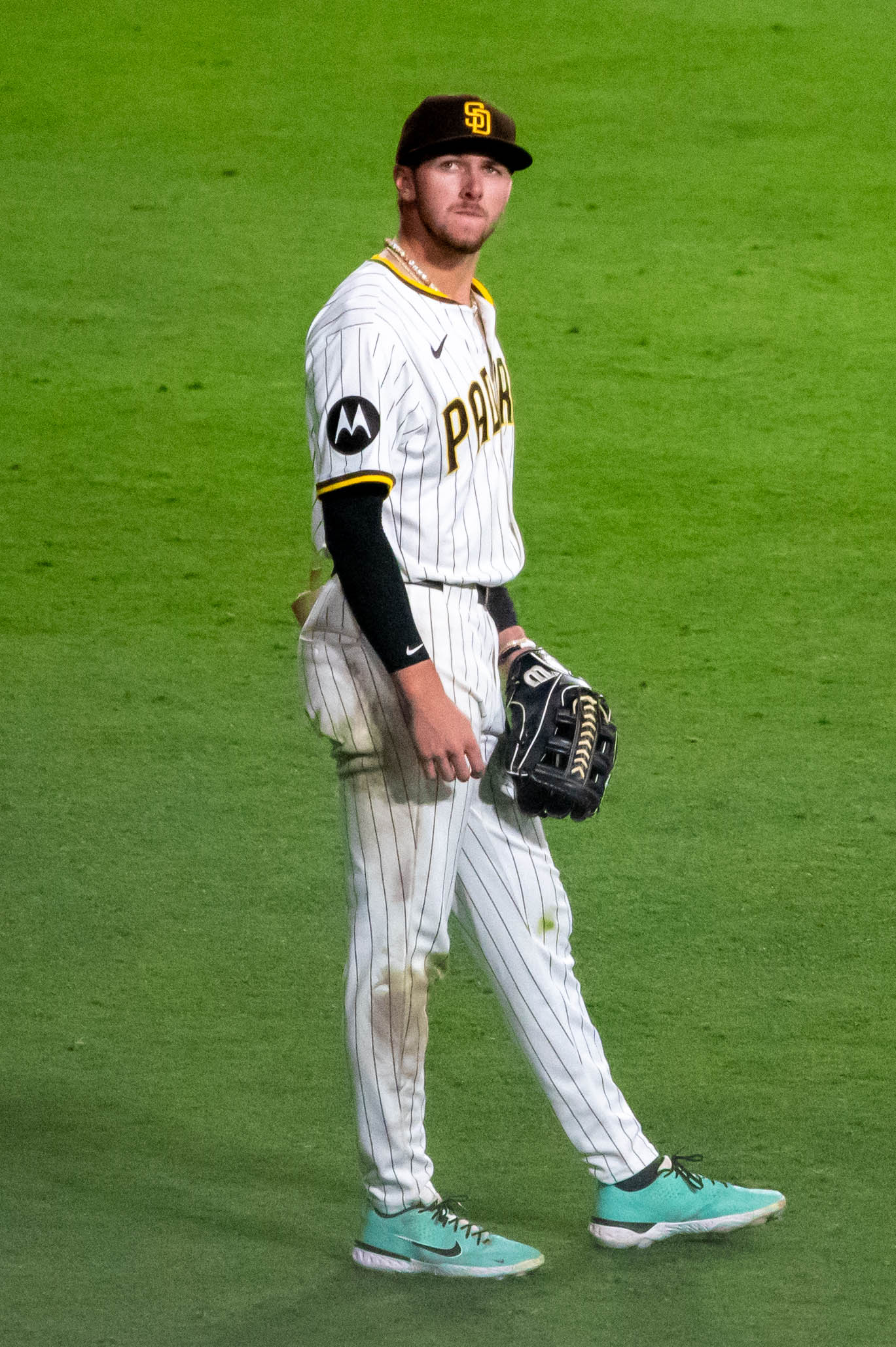
- Merrill with the San Diego Padres in 2024

San Diego Padres – No. 3
- Center fielder
- Born: April 19, 2003 (age 23); Baltimore, Maryland, U.S.
- Bats: Left Throws: Right

MLB debut
- March 20, 2024, for the San Diego Padres

MLB statistics (through 2026 season)
- Batting average: .270
- Home runs: 66
- Runs batted in: 244
- Stats at Baseball Reference

Teams
- San Diego Padres (2024–present)

Career highlights and awards
- All-Star (2024); Silver Slugger Award (2024)

Jackson Peter Merrill (born April 19, 2003) is an American professional baseball center fielder for the San Diego Padres of Major League Baseball (MLB). He was selected in the first round of the 2021 MLB draft by the Padres and made his MLB debut in 2024. He was selected for the 2024 MLB All-Star Game.

== Early life and amateur career ==
Jackson Merrill was born in Baltimore, Maryland, to Josh and Jennie Merrill. Merrill grew up in Severna Park, Maryland, and attended Severna Park High School. Despite being from the Baltimore area, Merrill grew up a fan of the Baltimore Orioles’ AL East division rival Boston Red Sox.

Merrill's junior season at Severna Park was canceled due to COVID-19, after which he focused on physical training and gained over 30 pounds (14 kg) of muscle. He initially committed to play college baseball for the Army Black Knights during his junior year, but later changed his commitment to the Kentucky Wildcats in his senior year. As a high school senior, he batted .500 with 13 home runs and 39 runs batted in (RBIs) and was named the Maryland Player of the Year by the Capital Gazette. Merrill was also a part of the Brooks Robinson All Star Game.

== Professional career ==
The San Diego Padres selected Merrill in the first round, with the 27th overall pick, in the 2021 Major League Baseball draft. He signed with San Diego for a $1.8 million signing bonus.

Merrill was assigned to the rookie-level Arizona Complex League Padres to start his professional career. Over 31 games and 107 at-bats, Merrill slashed .280/.339/.383 with seven doubles, two triples, 10 RBIs, 10 walks, and 27 strikeouts.

Merrill opened the 2022 season with the Lake Elsinore Storm of the Single-A California League. In 45 games, he hit .325/.387/.482 with five home runs, 34 RBI, and eight stolen bases.

Merrill split the 2023 season between the High–A Fort Wayne TinCaps and Double–A San Antonio Missions, playing in 114 total games and batting .277/.326/.444 with 15 home runs, 64 RBI, and 15 stolen bases.

On March 19, 2024, the Padres selected Merrill's contract and added him to their Opening Day roster. Merrill made his major league debut the following day against the Los Angeles Dodgers in the Seoul Series. On July 7, 2024, he was named as a reserve player in the 2024 MLB All-Star Game, becoming the first rookie in Padres history to ever make the All-Star Game. He finished his rookie season batting .292, with 24 home runs and 90 RBI.

In Game 2 of the National League Division Series against the Los Angeles Dodgers, Merrill hit a two-run home run in the top of the eighth to extend the Padres' lead to 6–1, which marked his first postseason home run in his career.

On April 2, 2025, the Padres signed Merrill to a 9-year contract extension worth $135m guaranteed. In 2026, he was in a major slump in the first half of the season before hitting 18 home runs over the last three months of the season.
