= Bryan Hoeing =

American baseball player (born 1996)

San Diego Padres – No. 78
- Pitcher
- Born: October 19, 1996 (age 29); Batesville, Indiana, U.S.
- Bats: Right Throws: Right

MLB debut
- August 20, 2022, for the Miami Marlins

MLB statistics (through 2025 season)
- Win–loss record: 6–7
- Earned run average: 4.72
- Strikeouts: 107
- Stats at Baseball Reference

Teams
- Miami Marlins (2022–2024); San Diego Padres (2024–2025)

Bryan Jerome Hoeing (born October 19, 1996) is an American professional baseball pitcher for the San Diego Padres of Major League Baseball (MLB). He has previously played in MLB for the Miami Marlins.

== Amateur career ==
Hoeing attended Batesville High School in Batesville, Indiana, where he played baseball and basketball. He was selected by the Arizona Diamondbacks in the 32nd round of the 2015 Major League Baseball draft, but he did not sign and instead enrolled at the University of Louisville to play college baseball for the Louisville Cardinals. In 2017 and 2018, he played collegiate summer baseball with the Bourne Braves of the Cape Cod Baseball League.

After his junior year in 2018, the San Francisco Giants selected Hoeing in the 36th round of the 2018 Major League Baseball draft. He did not sign with San Francisco, and returned to Louisville. As a senior in 2019, he appeared in 22 games and went 3–4 with a 3.00 ERA over 63 innings. After the season, he was selected by the Miami Marlins in the seventh round of the 2019 Major League Baseball draft.

== Professional career ==
=== Miami Marlins ===
Hoeing signed with the Marlins and made his professional debut with the Low-A Batavia Muckdogs, going 0–2 with a 4.43 ERA over 22 1/3 innings. He did not play a game in 2020 due to the cancellation of the minor league season because of the COVID-19 pandemic. In 2021, Hoeing played with the High-A Beloit Snappers with whom he started 22 games and went 7–6 with a 4.83 ERA and 96 strikeouts over 121 innings. He opened the 2022 season with the Double-A Pensacola Blue Wahoos, and was promoted to the Triple-A Jacksonville Jumbo Shrimp in early May.

On August 20, 2022, the Marlins selected Hoeing's contract and promoted him to the major leagues to make his MLB debut that night as the starting pitcher against the Los Angeles Dodgers at Dodger Stadium. He pitched three innings in which he gave up seven earned runs on eight hits (two home runs), one walk, and two strikeouts as the Marlins fell 7–0. In his rookie campaign, he made 8 appearances for Miami, struggling to a 12.08 ERA with 6 strikeouts in 12 2/3 innings pitched. On November 8, Hoeing was removed from the 40-man roster and sent outright to Triple-A.

Hoeing began the 2023 season with Triple-A Jacksonville, pitching in four games (three starts) and logging a 2.08 ERA with 20 strikeouts in 17 1/3 innings of work. On April 25, 2023, he had his contract selected to the active roster. In 33 appearances during his rookie campaign, Hoeing recording a 5.48 ERA with 53 strikeouts across 70 2/3 innings pitched.

Hoeing pitched in 16 contests for the Marlins in 2024, compiling a 2.70 ERA with 25 strikeouts over 30 innings of work.

=== San Diego Padres ===
On July 30, 2024, the Marlins traded Hoeing and Tanner Scott to the San Diego Padres in exchange for Robby Snelling, Adam Mazur, Graham Pauley, and Jay Beshears. In 18 appearances for San Diego, he compiled a 1–1 record and 1.52 ERA with 18 strikeouts across 23 2/3 innings pitched.

Hoeing began the 2025 season on the injured list due to a right shoulder strain. He was transferred to the 60-day injured list on April 27, 2025. Hoeing was activated for his season debut on June 21. In seven appearances for the Padres, he compiled a 1–0 record and 3.38 ERA with five strikeouts over eight innings of work.

On March 12, 2026, it was announced that Hoeing would require season-ending surgery to repair the flexor tendon in his right elbow.

== Personal life ==
Hoeing's cousin, Alex Meyer, played in MLB from 2015 to 2017 for the Minnesota Twins and Los Angeles Angels.
