= Robert Suárez =

Venezuelan baseball player (born 1991)

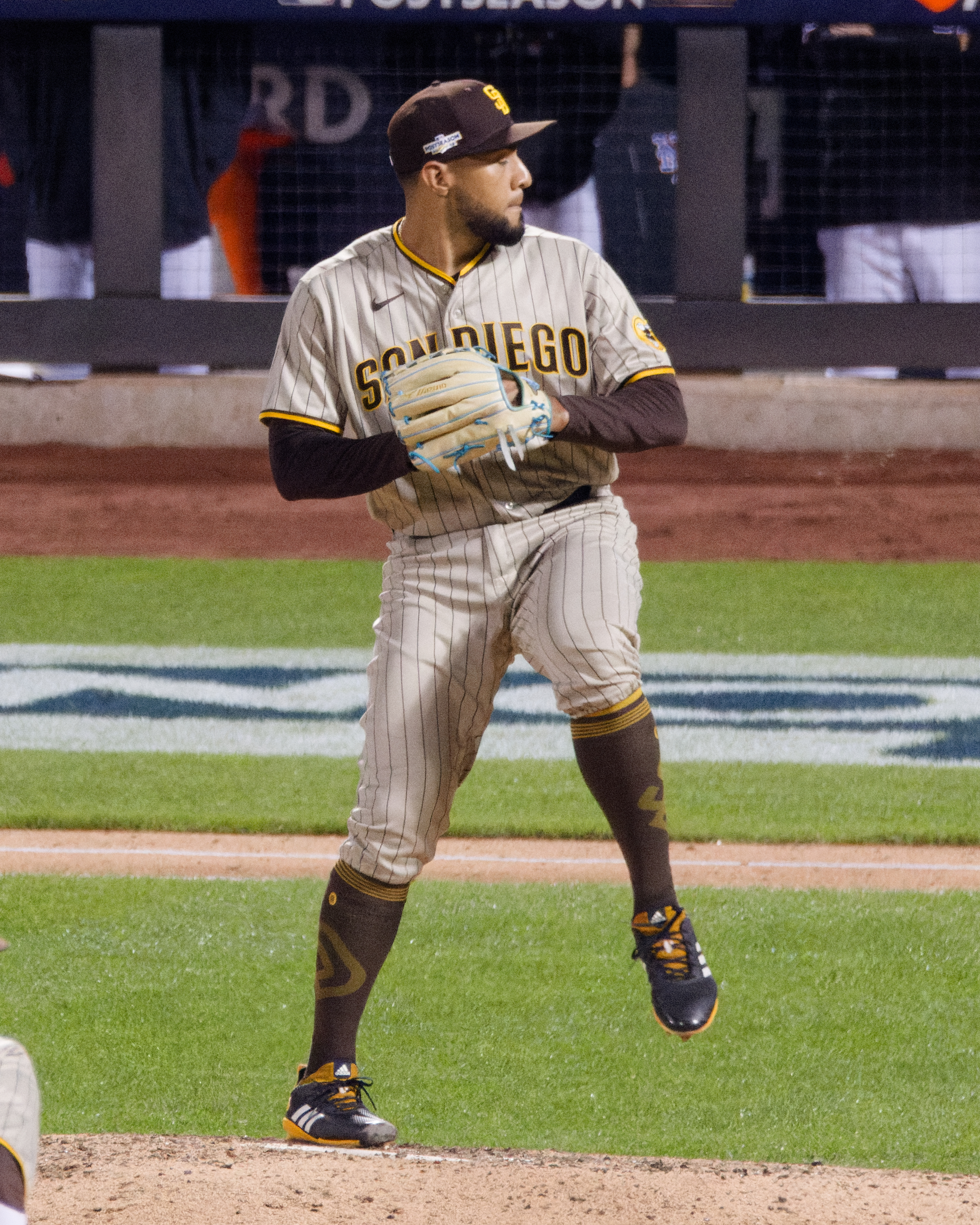
- Suárez with the San Diego Padres in 2022

Atlanta Braves – No. 75
- Pitcher
- Born: March 1, 1991 (age 35); Bolívar State, Venezuela
- Bats: Right Throws: Right

Professional debut
- NPB: April 10, 2016, for the Fukuoka SoftBank Hawks
- MLB: April 7, 2022, for the San Diego Padres

NPB statistics (through 2021 season)
- Win–loss record: 7–13
- Earned run average: 2.81
- Strikeouts: 209
- Saves: 68

MLB statistics (through 2026 season)
- Win–loss record: 26–13
- Earned run average: 2.66
- Strikeouts: 245
- Saves: 81
- Stats at Baseball Reference

Teams
- Fukuoka SoftBank Hawks (2016, 2018–2019); Hanshin Tigers (2020–2021); San Diego Padres (2022–2025); Atlanta Braves (2026–present)

Career highlights and awards
- NPB: 2× Japan Series Champion (2018, 2019); Central League saves leader (2020, 2021); NPB All-Star (2021); MLB: 2× All-Star (2024, 2025); NL saves leader (2025)

Robert Alexander Suárez Subero (born March 1, 1991) is a Venezuelan professional baseball pitcher for the Atlanta Braves of Major League Baseball (MLB). He has previously played in MLB for the San Diego Padres and in Nippon Professional Baseball (NPB) for the Fukuoka SoftBank Hawks and Hanshin Tigers. Suárez has been an MLB All-Star in 2024 and 2025, and led the NL in saves in 2025.

== Career ==
=== Saraperos de Saltillo ===
On April 16, 2015, Suárez signed with the Saraperos de Saltillo of the Mexican League. In 43 games for Saltillo, Suárez logged a 5–0 win–loss record and 1.71 earned run average (ERA) with 48 strikeouts.

=== Fukuoka SoftBank Hawks ===
On November 2, 2015, Suárez signed with the Fukuoka SoftBank Hawks of Nippon Professional Baseball (NPB) . He made his NPB debut on April 10, 2016. In 2016, he finished the regular season with a 2–6 record, a 3.19 ERA, 64 strikeouts, 26 holds, and one save in 53 2/3 innings.

On February 8, 2017, Suarez was selected to the Venezuela national baseball team for the 2017 World Baseball Classic. On March 12, he injured his right elbow in a game against Mexico. He had Tommy John surgery on April 14.

On August 11, 2018, Suarez pitched in the Pacific League against the Hokkaido Nippon-Ham Fighters for the first time in two years. He finished the regular season with 11 games pitched, a 1–1 win–loss record, a 6.30 ERA, 3 holds, and 10 strikeouts in 10 innings.

Suarez finished the 2019 regular season with an 0–4 win–loss record, a 5.74 ERA, and 27 strikeouts in 26 2/3 innings across nine games. He pitched in the 2019 Japan Series. On November 28, the Fukuoka SoftBank Hawks announced that the team would not re-sign Suárez for next season. On December 2, he became a free agent.

=== Hanshin Tigers ===
On December 19, 2019, Suárez signed with the Hanshin Tigers of NPB. In 2020, Suárez pitched to a 2.24 ERA over 52 1/3 innings.

On December 2, 2020, he became a free agent. On December 24, Suárez re-signed with the Tigers. On June 13, 2021, Suárez set a Hanshin club record by recording a save in his 12th consecutive mound appearance, breaking the previous record of 11 held by former Tigers pitcher Kyuji Fujikawa. On June 30, Suárez's streak ended when he came in to pitch in a tie game, with the new record being set at 14 consecutive mound appearances with a save.

=== San Diego Padres ===
On December 1, 2021, Suárez signed a one-year contract with a 2023 player option with the San Diego Padres.

On April 7, 2022, Suárez made his major league debut against the Arizona Diamondbacks, walking the first two batters he faced on a combined nine pitches before throwing a wild pitch, and then hitting a batter. Suárez was removed from the game without having recorded an out. All three runners he allowed later scored, earning him the loss. On July 12, Suárez was placed on the 60-day injured list after undergoing knee surgery to remove "loose impediments" the month prior. He was activated on August 6. On November 7, Suárez opted out of his contract and became a free agent.

On November 17, 2022, the Padres signed Suárez to a five-year, $46 million contract. After suffering from arm stiffness and right elbow inflammation during spring training, Suárez began the 2023 season on the injured list. He was transferred to the 60–day injured list on April 20, 2023. Suárez was activated on July 20. On August 23, Suárez was ejected for a sticky substance following a glove check, and received a 10–day suspension, which he unsuccessfully appealed. He finished the 2023 season with a 4–3 record and a 4.23 ERA with 24 strikeouts.

In the 2024 season, Suárez was named as an All-Star. He finished the season with a 9–3 record and a 2.77 ERA, along with 36 saves and 59 strikeouts.

On May 2, 2025, Suárez was named as the National League Reliever of the Month for April. Suárez was suspended for two games and fined an undisclosed amount for intentionally hitting batter Shohei Ohtani with a pitch on June 19, during a game against the Los Angeles Dodgers. On July 8, Suárez was selected to his second consecutive All-Star Game. In 70 appearances for San Diego, he compiled a 4-6 record and 2.97 ERA with 75 strikeouts and a league-leading 40 saves across 69 2/3 innings pitched. Suárez opted out of his contract on November 3, and became a free agent.

=== Atlanta Braves ===
On December 11, 2025, the Atlanta Braves signed Suárez to a three-year contract worth $45 million. On June 26, 2026, Suárez was placed on the injured list due to right elbow inflammation. He was transferred to the 60–day injured list on September 1. On September 23, Suárez was activated ahead of the team's game against the Cincinnati Reds.

== Personal life ==
His brother, Albert Suárez, is also a pitcher in MLB.
