= 2026 San Diego Padres season =

2026 San Diego Padres
- National League Wild Card winners
- League: National League
- Division: West
- Ballpark: Petco Park
- City: San Diego, California
- Record: 91–71 (.562)
- Divisional place: 2nd
- Owners: Seidler Equity Partners
- General manager: A. J. Preller
- Manager: Craig Stammen
- Television: MLB Local Media
- Radio: KWFN · KBZT

The 2026 San Diego Padres season was the 58th season of the San Diego Padres franchise. The Padres compete in Major League Baseball (MLB) as a member club of the National League (NL) West Division. The team plays its home games at Petco Park.

On May 4, the Padres were sold to private equity billionaire José E. Feliciano and his wife, artist, investor and entrepreneur Kwanza Jones, for a then-record $3.9 billion.

The Padres had a 50–53 record in late July, when they were four games back and trailing five teams for the final postseason berth. They finished an MLB-leading 41–18 since July 24, and clinched a playoff berth for the third consecutive season after a 4–2 win against the Dodgers on September 24. They swept the Chicago Cubs in the National League Wild Card Series in two games and advanced to the National League Division Series against the eventual World Series champion Milwaukee Brewers, which is where their season ended with a 3–1 series loss.

== Season standings ==
=== National League West ===
NL West
Team	W	L	Pct.	GB	Home	Road
Los Angeles Dodgers	100	62	.617	—	51‍–‍30	49‍–‍32
San Diego Padres	91	71	.562	9	51‍–‍30	40‍–‍41
Arizona Diamondbacks	86	76	.531	14	45‍–‍36	41‍–‍40
San Francisco Giants	65	97	.401	35	37‍–‍44	28‍–‍53
Colorado Rockies	58	104	.358	42	32‍–‍49	26‍–‍55

=== National League Wild Card ===
Division leaders
Team	W	L	Pct.
Milwaukee Brewers	103	59	.636
Los Angeles Dodgers	100	62	.617
Atlanta Braves	94	68	.580

Wild Card teams (Top 3 teams qualify for postseason)
Team	W	L	Pct.	GB
San Diego Padres	91	71	.562	+3
Chicago Cubs	89	73	.549	+1
Philadelphia Phillies	88	74	.543	—
Arizona Diamondbacks	86	76	.531	2
Pittsburgh Pirates	82	80	.506	6
Miami Marlins	80	82	.494	8
St. Louis Cardinals	77	85	.475	11
Washington Nationals	77	85	.475	11
Cincinnati Reds	75	87	.463	13
New York Mets	74	88	.457	14
San Francisco Giants	65	97	.401	23
Colorado Rockies	58	104	.358	30

=== Record vs. opponents ===
2026 National League record Source: MLB Standings Grid – 2026
Team	AZ	ATL	CHC	CIN	COL	LAD	MIA	MIL	NYM	PHI	PIT	SD	SF	STL	WSH	AL
Arizona	—	4–3	2–4	4–2	9–4	7–6	1–5	2–4	4–2	3–3	3–3	6–7	10–3	5–2	2–4	24–24
Atlanta	3–4	—	3–3	3–3	6–0	5–1	9–4	3–3	6–7	9–4	5–1	3–4	1–5	2–4	9–4	27–21
Chicago	4–2	3–3	—	9–4	3–3	4–2	3–3	4–9	7–0	6–1	7–6	5–1	3–3	6–7	3–3	22–26
Cincinnati	2–4	3–3	4–9	—	4–2	1–6	3–4	4–9	4–2	3–3	6–7	3–3	3–3	5–8	1–5	29–19
Colorado	4–9	0–6	3–3	2–4	—	3–10	2–5	1–5	4–2	2–4	3–3	2–11	7–6	2–4	3–4	20–28
Los Angeles	6–7	1–5	2–4	6–1	10–3	—	2–4	3–4	5–1	4–2	5–1	8–5	9–4	2–4	6–0	31–17
Miami	5–1	4–9	3–3	4–3	5–2	4–2	—	1–5	6–7	5–8	4–2	0–6	4–2	4–2	9–4	22–26
Milwaukee	4–2	3–3	9–4	9–4	5–1	4–3	5–1	—	4–2	4–2	6–7	2–4	3–4	11–2	2–4	32–16
New York	2–4	7–6	0–7	2–4	2–4	1–5	7–6	2–4	—	6–7	4–2	4–2	5–2	2–4	7–6	23–25
Philadelphia	3–3	4–9	1–6	3–3	4–2	2–4	8–5	2–4	7–6	—	5–2	6–0	4–2	4–2	9–4	26–22
Pittsburgh	3–3	1–5	6–7	7–6	3–3	1–5	2–4	7–6	2–4	2–5	—	3–3	3–3	6–7	4–3	32–16
San Diego	7–6	4–3	1–5	3–3	11–2	5–8	6–0	4–2	2–4	0–6	3–3	—	9–4	3–4	4–2	29–19
San Francisco	3–10	5–1	3–3	3–3	6–7	4–9	2–4	4–3	2–5	2–4	3–3	4–9	—	5–1	3–3	16–32
St. Louis	2–5	4–2	7–6	8–5	4–2	4–2	2–4	2–11	4–2	2–4	7–6	4–3	1–5	—	3–3	23–25
Washington	4–2	4–9	3–3	5–1	4–3	0–6	4–9	4–2	6–7	4–9	3–4	2–4	3–3	3–3	—	28–20

Updated with the results of all games through September 27, 2026.

== Regular season ==
=== Opening day lineup ===
Order	No.	Player	Pos.
Batters
1	23	Fernando Tatis Jr.	RF
2	2	Xander Bogaerts	SS
3	13	Manny Machado	3B
4	3	Jackson Merrill	CF
5	41	Miguel Andujar	DH
6	30	Gavin Sheets	1B
7	5	Ramón Laureano	LF
8	54	Freddy Fermin	C
9	9	Jake Cronenworth	2B
Starting pitcher
—	27	Nick Pivetta	

=== Game log ===
2026 Game Log: 91–71 (Home: 51–30; Road: 40–41)
March/April: 19–11 (Home: 10–6; Road: 9–5)

#	Date	Opponent	Score	Win	Loss	Save	Attendance	Record	Streak
1	March 26	Tigers	2–8	Skubal (1–0)	**Pivetta** (0–1)	—	45,673	0–1	L1
2	March 27	Tigers	2–5	De Jesus (1–0)	**Estrada** (0–1)	Jansen (1)	44,896	0–2	L2
3	March 28	Tigers	3–0	**Vásquez** (1–0)	Flaherty (0–1)	**Miller** (1)	44,368	1–2	W1
4	March 30	Giants	2–3	Roupp (1–0)	**Buehler** (0–1)	Walker (1)	43,611	1–3	L1
5	March 31	Giants	3–9	Webb (1–1)	**Márquez** (0–1)	—	41,891	1–4	L2
6	April 1	Giants	7–1	**Pivetta** (1–1)	Houser (0–1)	**Miller** (2)	41,491	2–4	W1
7	April 3	@ Red Sox	2–5	Gray (1–0)	**King** (0–1)	Chapman (2)	36,233	2–5	L1
8	April 4	@ Red Sox	3–2	**Morejón** (1–0)	Chapman (0–1)	**Miller** (3)	36,405	3–5	W1
9	April 5	@ Red Sox	8–6	**Estrada** (1–1)	Uberstine (0–1)	**Miller** (4)	29,240	4–5	W2
10	April 6	@ Pirates	5–0	**Márquez** (1–1)	Chandler (0–1)	—	8,446	5–5	W3
11	April 7	@ Pirates	1–7	Skenes (2–1)	**Pivetta** (1–2)	—	9,061	5–6	L1
12	April 8	@ Pirates	8–2	**King** (1–1)	Lawrence (0–1)	—	10,046	6–6	W1
13	April 9	Rockies	7–3 (12)	**Morgan** (1–0)	Bellozo (0–1)	—	41,390	7–6	W2
14	April 10	Rockies	5–2	**Miller** (1–0)	Mejía (0–2)	—	42,454	8–6	W3
15	April 11	Rockies	9–5	**Márquez** (2–1)	Feltner (1–1)	**Adam** (1)	42,318	9–6	W4
16	April 12	Rockies	7–2	**Morgan** (2–0)	Herget (0–1)	—	39,786	10–6	W5
17	April 14	Mariners	4–1	**King** (2–1)	Woo (0–2)	**Miller** (5)	38,152	11–6	W6
18	April 15	Mariners	7–6	**Jacob** (1–0)	Muñoz (2–2)	—	46,095	12–6	W7
19	April 16	Mariners	5–2	**Buehler** (1–1)	Castillo (0–1)	**Miller** (6)	39,008	13–6	W8
20	April 17	@ Angels	0–8	Soriano (5–0)	**Waldron** (0–1)	—	44,551	13–7	L1
21	April 18	@ Angels	4–1	**Morejón** (2–0)	Zeferjahn (1–1)	**Miller** (7)	44,279	14–7	W1
22	April 19	@ Angels	2–1	**King** (3–1)	Ureña (0–2)	**Miller** (8)	44,560	15–7	W2
23	April 21	@ Rockies	1–0	**Vásquez** (2–0)	Dollander (2–2)	**Morejón** (1)	15,672	16–7	W3
24	April 22	@ Rockies	3–8	Sugano (2–1)	**Buehler** (1–2)	—	18,114	16–8	L1
25	April 23	@ Rockies	10–8	**Marinaccio** (1–0)	Vodnik (0–2)	**Miller** (9)	25,973	17–8	W1
26	April 25	@ Diamondbacks*	6–4	**Márquez** (3–1)	Clarke (1–1)	**Miller** (10)	19,630	18–8	W2
27	April 26	@ Diamondbacks*	7–12	Thompson (2–0)	**Rodríguez** (0–1)	—	19,671	18–9	L1
28	April 27	Cubs	9–7	**Vásquez** (3–0)	Brown (1–1)	—	41,478	19–9	W1
29	April 28	Cubs	3–8	Cabrera (3–0)	**Hart** (0–1)	—	40,106	19–10	L1
30	April 29	Cubs	4–5	Taillon (2–1)	**Morejón** (2–1)	Milner (1)	36,513	19–11	L2
*April 25 and 26 games played at Estadio Alfredo Harp Helú in Mexico City, Mexico

May: 13–15 (Home: 6–10; Road: 7–5)

#	Date	Opponent	Score	Win	Loss	Save	Attendance	Record	Streak
31	May 1	White Sox	2–8	Schultz (2–1)	**Márquez** (3–2)	—	43,638	19–12	L3
32	May 2	White Sox	0–4	Burke (2–2)	**King** (3–2)	Domínguez (8)	42,758	19–13	L4
33	May 3	White Sox	4–3	**Adam** (1–0)	Davis (0–1)	**Miller** (11)	40,171	20–13	W1
34	May 4	@ Giants	2–3	McDonald (1–0)	**Vásquez** (3–1)	Kilian (1)	33,097	20–14	L1
35	May 5	@ Giants	10–5	**Buehler** (2–2)	Webb (2–4)	—	38,275	21–14	W1
36	May 6	@ Giants	5–1	**Waldron** (1–1)	Houser (0–4)	—	34,181	22–14	W2
37	May 7	Cardinals	1–2	Liberatore (2–1)	**Rodríguez** (0–2)	O'Brien (11)	44,966	22–15	L1
38	May 8	Cardinals	0–6	McGreevy (3–2)	**Canning** (0–1)	—	40,442	22–16	L2
39	May 9	Cardinals	4–2	**Vásquez** (4–1)	May (3–4)	**Miller** (12)	41,559	23–16	W1
40	May 10	Cardinals	3–2 (10)	**Morejón** (3–1)	Graceffo (2–1)	—	39,795	24–16	W2
41	May 12	@ Brewers	4–6	Sproat (1–2)	**Waldron** (1–2)	Uribe (4)	25,372	24–17	L1
42	May 13	@ Brewers	3–1	**Adam** (2–0)	Uribe (2–2)	**Miller** (13)	28,683	25–17	W1
43	May 14	@ Brewers	1–7	Harrison (4–1)	**Canning** (0–2)	—	34,862	25–18	L1
44	May 15	@ Mariners	2–0	**Vásquez** (5–1)	Hancock (3–2)	**Miller** (14)	43,349	26–18	W1
45	May 16	@ Mariners	7–4	**Buehler** (3–2)	Gilbert (2–4)	**Estrada** (1)	44,207	27–18	W2
46	May 17	@ Mariners	8–3	**Giolito** (1–0)	Kirby (5–3)	—	40,365	28–18	W3
47	May 18	Dodgers	1–0	**King** (4–2)	Yamamoto (3–4)	**Miller** (15)	40,882	29–18	W4
48	May 19	Dodgers	4–5	Scott (1–1)	**Miller** (1–1)	Klein (1)	39,788	29–19	L1
49	May 20	Dodgers	0–4	Ohtani (4–2)	**Vásquez** (5–2)	—	41,888	29–20	L2
50	May 22	Athletics	7–3	**Morejón** (4–1)	Springs (3–5)	—	41,180	30–20	W1
51	May 23	Athletics	2–0	**Giolito** (2–0)	Ginn (2–3)	**Miller** (16)	42,616	31–20	W2
52	May 24	Athletics	2–5	Lopez (4–2)	**King** (4–3)	Barlow (1)	41,799	31–21	L1
53	May 25	Phillies	0–3	Luzardo (4–4)	**Canning** (0–3)	Durán (10)	41,293	31–22	L2
54	May 26	Phillies	3–4	Nola (3–4)	**Vásquez** (5–3)	Durán (11)	40,399	31–23	L3
55	May 27	Phillies	0–3	Sánchez (6–2)	**Buehler** (3–3)	Alvarado (1)	37,426	31–24	L4
56	May 29	@ Nationals	7–5	**Estrada** (2–1)	Parker (2–2)	**Miller** (17)	26,529	32–24	W1
57	May 30	@ Nationals	4–9	Lord (3–0)	**King** (4–4)	Beeter (3)	30,765	32–25	L1
58	May 31	@ Nationals	2–4	Littell (5–4)	**Canning** (0–4)	Beeter (4)	24,050	32–26	L2

June: 11–15 (Home: 7–5; Road: 4–10)

#	Date	Opponent	Score	Win	Loss	Save	Attendance	Record	Streak
59	June 2	@ Phillies	2–3	Alvarado (2–1)	**Estrada** (2–2)	Durán (13)	38,763	32–27	L3
60	June 3	@ Phillies	2–3	Sánchez (7–2)	**Adam** (2–1)	Durán (14)	40,453	32–28	L4
61	June 4	@ Phillies	4–6	Wheeler (5–1)	**Giolito** (2–1)	—	37,812	32–29	L5
62	June 5	Mets	0–5	Scott (2–0)	**King** (4–5)	—	42,159	32–30	L6
63	June 6	Mets	3–2	**Rodríguez** (1–2)	Warren (1–2)	**Miller** (18)	40,770	33–30	W1
64	June 7	Mets	3–7	Manaea (1–1)	**Vásquez** (5–4)	—	41,159	33–31	L1
65	June 8	Reds	6–2	**Morejón** (5–1)	Abbott (4–4)	—	37,223	34–31	W1
66	June 9	Reds	3–5 (11)	Antone (1–0)	**Matsui** (0–1)	Maxwell (1)	40,469	34–32	L1
67	June 10	Reds	5–4	**Peralta** (1–0)	Petty (0–1)	—	37,393	35–32	W1
68	June 12	@ Orioles	3–7	Baz (4–6)	**Canning** (0–5)	—	25,458	35–33	L1
69	June 13	@ Orioles	9–3	**Vásquez** (6–4)	Gibson (1–2)	—	25,722	36–33	W1
70	June 14	@ Orioles	5–2	**Buehler** (4–3)	Rogers (3–7)	**Miller** (19)	20,611	37–33	W2
71	June 15	@ Cardinals	0–3	May (5–6)	**Giolito** (2–2)	—	26,973	37–34	L1
72	June 16	@ Cardinals	2–3	Pallante (8–4)	**King** (4–6)	O'Brien (18)	29,604	37–35	L2
73	June 17	@ Cardinals	6–1	**Canning** (1–5)	Leahy (5–4)	—	29,859	38–35	W1
74	June 19	@ Rangers	7–9	deGrom (6–4)	**Vásquez** (6–5)	Latz (13)	33,406	38–36	L1
75	June 20	@ Rangers	6–4 (10)	**Morejón** (6–1)	Ross (0–1)	**Miller** (20)	35,383	39–36	W1
76	June 21	@ Rangers	3–4	Eovaldi (7–7)	**Giolito** (2–3)	Junis (5)	36,311	39–37	L1
77	June 22	Braves	1–0	**King** (5–6)	Holmes (4–4)	**Miller** (21)	42,572	40–37	W1
78	June 23	Braves	7–6 (10)	**Miller** (2–1)	Iglesias (0–2)	—	41,379	41–37	W2
79	June 24	Braves	5–2	**Sears** (1–0)	Pérez (6–4)	**Adam** (2)	40,183	42–37	W3
80	June 26	Dodgers	7–1	**Buehler** (5–3)	Sasaki (3–5)	—	43,153	43–37	W4
81	June 27	Dodgers	3–15	Yamamoto (8–5)	**Vásquez** (6–6)	—	45,159	43–38	L1
82	June 28	Dodgers	2–4	Sheehan (4–5)	**King** (5–7)	Henriquez (1)	41,189	43–39	L2
83	June 29	@ Cubs	2–3	Thornton (3–2)	**Adam** (2–2)	—	37,607	43–40	L3
84	June 30	@ Cubs	7–9	Boyd (3–1)	**Sears** (1–1)	Rolison (1)	36,279	43–41	L4

July: 13–13 (Home: 7–4; Road: 6–9)

#	Date	Opponent	Score	Win	Loss	Save	Attendance	Record	Streak
85	July 1	@ Cubs	3–23	Rea (6–5)	**Buehler** (5–4)	Wicks (2)	37,311	43–42	L5
86	July 2	@ Dodgers	7–12	Klein (3–2)	**Peralta** (1–1)	—	54,081	43–43	L6
87	July 3	@ Dodgers	3–4	Hurt (3–1)	**Morejón** (6–2)	Scott (12)	49,578	43–44	L7
88	July 4	@ Dodgers	0–3	Yamamoto (9–5)	**Canning** (1–6)	Klein (2)	52,284	43–45	L8
89	July 5	@ Dodgers	5–2	**Sears** (2–1)	Sheehan (4–6)	**Miller** (22)	46,506	44–45	W1
90	July 6	Diamondbacks	0–8	Pfaadt (2–1)	**Buehler** (5–5)	—	38,204	44–46	L1
91	July 7	Diamondbacks	4–1	**Márquez** (4–2)	Gallen (3–9)	**Miller** (23)	40,223	45–46	W1
92	July 8	Diamondbacks	10–4	**King** (6–7)	Cabrera (0–2)	—	39,423	46–46	W2
93	July 9	Diamondbacks	1–3	Kelly (7–8)	**Canning** (1–7)	Sewald (21)	39,270	46–47	L1
94	July 10	Blue Jays	3–5	Fluharty (4–0)	**Sears** (2–2)	Varland (19)	41,886	46–48	L2
95	July 11	Blue Jays	8–7	**Rodríguez** (2–2)	Fluharty (4–1)	**Miller** (24)	40,561	47–48	W1
96	July 12	Blue Jays	5–4	**Morejón** (7–2)	Hoffman (5–6)	**Miller** (25)	41,675	48–48	W2
**96th All-Star Game: Philadelphia, PA**
97	July 17	@ Royals	6–7 (10)	Erceg (4–3)	**Hart** (0–2)	—	25,884	48–49	L1
98	July 18	@ Royals	1–6	Lynch IV (3–2)	**Canning** (1–8)	—	23,347	48–50	L2
99	July 19	@ Royals	19–2	**Matsui** (1–1)	Cameron (5–8)	—	18,383	49–50	W1
100	July 20	@ Braves	2–3	Elder (6–6)	**Sears** (2–3)	Mederos (1)	31,263	49–51	L1
101	July 21	@ Braves	8–3	**Buehler** (6–5)	López (4–3)	—	31,870	50–51	W1
102	July 22	@ Braves	6–7	Lee (5–0)	**Peralta** (1–2)	Iglesias (20)	33,766	50–52	L1
103	July 23	@ Braves	5–6	Sale (11–6)	**Canning** (1–9)	Iglesias (21)	29,441	50–53	L2
104	July 24	@ Marlins	4–2	**Morejón** (8–2)	Zuber (0–1)	**Miller** (26)	16,151	51–53	W1
105	July 25	@ Marlins	7–2	**Sears** (3–3)	Pérez (5–8)	—	22,319	52–53	W2
106	July 26	@ Marlins	5–3	**Peralta** (2–2)	Bachar (1–2)	**Miller** (27)	21,675	53–53	W3
107	July 28	Rockies	8–7	**Miller** (3–1)	Herget (0–4)	—	42,433	54–53	W4
108	July 29	Rockies	3–1	**Canning** (2–9)	Hughes (0–3)	**Miller** (28)	40,714	55–53	W5
109	July 30	Giants	1–4	Ray (10–6)	**Sears** (3–4)	Miller (4)	42,758	55–54	L1
110	July 31	Giants	7–0	**Matsui** (2–1)	Whisenhunt (2–2)	**Márquez** (1)	44,057	56–54	W1

August: 17–11 (Home: 11–3; Road: 6–8)

#	Date	Opponent	Score	Win	Loss	Save	Attendance	Record	Streak
111	August 1	Giants	6–5	**Miller** (4–1)	Smith (0–3)	—	43,766	57–54	W2
112	August 2	Giants	5–4	**Canning** (3–9)	Roupp (7–10)	**Morejón** (2)	43,856	58–54	W3
113	August 3	@ Diamondbacks	1–5	Pfaadt (6–1)	**King** (6–8)	—	22,008	58–55	L1
114	August 4	@ Diamondbacks	9–4	**Vásquez** (7–6)	Rodríguez (10–4)	—	20,839	59–55	W1
115	August 5	@ Diamondbacks	4–10	Bratt (1–1)	**Mize** (4–7)	—	17,559	59–56	L1
116	August 6	@ Diamondbacks	5–1	**Rodríguez** (3–2)	Drake (0–1)	—	21,884	60–56	W1
117	August 7	Astros	3–6	Abreu (4–3)	**Ray** (10–7)	Hader (16)	40,958	60–57	L1
118	August 8	Astros	3–2	**King** (7–8)	Lambert (8–6)	**Miller** (29)	41,937	61–57	W1
119	August 9	Astros	7–2	**Vásquez** (8–6)	Javier (1–3)	—	40,160	62–57	W2
120	August 10	Brewers	3–2	**Matsui** (3–1)	Henderson (6–2)	**Miller** (30)	40,323	63–57	W3
121	August 11	Brewers	11–2	**Buehler** (7–5)	Harrison (9–3)	—	40,534	64–57	W4
122	August 12	Brewers	4–3 (11)	**Morejón** (9–2)	Senzatela (9–4)	—	36,072	65–57	W5
123	August 14	@ Guardians	7–5	**King** (8–8)	Williams (11–7)	**Rodríguez** (1)	35,726	66–57	W6
124	August 15	@ Guardians	1–6	Cantillo (9–7)	**Hart** (0–3)	—	35,153	66–58	L1
125	August 16	@ Guardians	5–0	**Mize** (5–7)	Bibee (4–13)	—	24,708	67–58	W1
126	August 17	@ Mets	1–2	McLean (9–8)	**Buehler** (7–6)	Duarte (2)	27,842	67–59	L1
127	August 18	@ Mets	5–2	**Ray** (11–7)	Thornton (3–4)	**Miller** (31)	35,508	68–59	W1
128	August 19	@ Mets	2–4	Lavender (1–0)	**King** (8–9)	Senga (4)	26,195	68–60	L1
129	August 21	Twins	6–2	**Vásquez** (9–6)	Prielipp (3–7)	—	44,293	69–60	W1
130	August 22	Twins	7–5	**Canning** (4–9)	Morris (4–5)	**Miller** (32)	41,484	70–60	W2
131	August 23	Twins	8–1	**Buehler** (8–6)	Funderburk (3–2)	—	40,103	71–60	W3
132	August 24	Pirates	2–3 (12)	Yates (2–5)	**Estrada** (2–3)	Ramírez (2)	40,447	71–61	L1
133	August 25	Pirates	0–1	Soto (6–4)	**Miller** (4–2)	Montgomery (6)	40,709	71–62	L2
134	August 26	Pirates	3–0	**Vásquez** (10–6)	Chandler (6–9)	**Rodríguez** (2)	40,413	72–62	W1
135	August 28	@ Rays	4–9	McClanahan (10–6)	**Mize** (5–8)	—	16,470	72–63	L1
136	August 29	@ Rays	6–7	Kelly (6–3)	**Rodríguez** (3–3)	Baker (39)	25,621	72–64	L2
137	August 30	@ Rays	4–5 (11)	Wells (3–2)	**Morgan** (2–1)	—	19,576	72–65	L3
138	August 31	@ Reds	5–0	**King** (9–9)	Singer (5–13)	—	16,162	73–65	W1

September: 18–6 (Home: 10–2; Road: 8–4)

#	Date	Opponent	Score	Win	Loss	Save	Attendance	Record	Streak
139	September 1	@ Reds	3–4	Burke (6–5)	**Morejón** (9–3)	Pagán (20)	19,376	73–66	L1
140	September 2	@ Reds	3–7	Williamson (3–3)	**Mize** (5–9)	—	14,632	73–67	L2
141	September 4	Yankees	3–2 (10)	**Miller** (5–2)	Blackburn (7–3)	—	41,345	74–67	W1
142	September 5	Yankees	1–5	Rodón (5–3)	**Ray** (11–8)	—	40,946	74–68	L1
143	September 6	Yankees	4–3	**King** (10–9)	Cole (8–8)	**Miller** (33)	41,061	75–68	W1
144	September 7	Nationals	3–2	**Pivetta** (2–2)	Irvin (2–9)	**Miller** (34)	38,149	76–68	W2
145	September 8	Nationals	5–4	**Morgan** (3–1)	Tolman (0–1)	**Morejón** (3)	42,681	77–68	W3
146	September 9	Nationals	9–2	**Hart** (1–3)	Kent (1–4)	—	33,276	78–68	W4
147	September 11	@ Giants	7–5	**Ray** (12–8)	Molina (3–1)	**Miller** (35)	38,381	79–68	W5
148	September 12	@ Giants	7–6	**King** (11–9)	Perdomo (0–1)	**Miller** (36)	40,146	80–68	W6
149	September 13	@ Giants	6–4	**Peralta** (3–2)	Webb (8–9)	**Matsui** (1)	35,115	81–68	W7
150	September 14	@ Rockies	8–7	**Mize** (6–9)	Sugano (12–10)	**Miller** (37)	14,805	82–68	W8
151	September 15	@ Rockies	3–9	Feltner (6–10)	**Peralta** (3–3)	—	15,115	82–69	L1
152	September 16	@ Rockies	9–3	**Ray** (13–8)	Adams (0–1)	—	16,806	83–69	W1
153	September 17	@ Rockies	9–2	**King** (12–9)	Gordon (1–5)	—	16,674	84–69	W2
154	September 18	Marlins	8–2	**Pivetta** (3–2)	Gibson (5–2)	—	42,765	85–69	W3
155	September 19	Marlins	7–6 (10)	**Morgan** (4–1)	Ekness (2–4)	—	43,433	86–69	W4
156	September 20	Marlins	7–3	**Buehler** (9–6)	Alcántara (13–11)	—	40,847	87–69	W5
157	September 22	@ Dodgers	0–7	Wrobleski (12–5)	**King** (12–10)	—	46,066	87–70	L1
158	September 23	@ Dodgers	5–1	**Rodríguez** (4–3)	Yamamoto (14–9)	—	48,201	88–70	W1
159	September 24	@ Dodgers	4–2	**Matsui** (4–1)	Glasnow (5–2)	**Miller** (38)	53,027	89–70	W2
160	September 25	Diamondbacks	4–11	Pfaadt (8–3)	**Mize** (6–10)	—	44,512	89–71	L1
161	September 26	Diamondbacks	10–7	**Matsui** (5–1)	Cabrera (0–4)	—	44,698	90–71	W1
162	September 27	Diamondbacks	9–4	**Canning** (5–9)	Martínez (3–1)	—	44,471	91–71	W2

Legend: = Win = Loss = Postponement = Clinched postseason
Bold = Padres team member

== Postseason ==
=== Game log ===
2026 Postseason Game Log: 3–3 (Home: 3–1; Away: 0–2)
NL Wild Card Series: 2–0 (Home: 2–0; Away: 0–0)

#	Date	Opponent	Score	Win	Loss	Save	Attendance	Series
1	September 29	Cubs	8–0	King (1–0)	Boyd (0–1)	–	47,048	1–0
2	September 30	Cubs	4–1	Rodríguez (1–0)	Gausman (0–1)	Miller (1)	47,513	2–0

NL Division Series: 1–3 (Home: 1–1; Away: 0–2)

#	Date	Opponent	Score	Win	Loss	Save	Attendance	Series
1	October 3	@ Brewers	2–3	Hall (1–0)	Morejón (0–1)	Megill (1)	42,843	0–1
2	October 4	@ Brewers	3–4	Megill (1–0)	Miller (0–1)	–	41,683	0–2
3	October 6	Brewers	4–3	Matsui (1–0)	Romero (0–1)	King (1)	47,708	1–2
4	October 7	Brewers	1–3	Ashby (1–0)	Ray (0–1)	Megill (2)	47,712	1–3

=== Postseason rosters ===
Playoff rosters
National League Wild Card Series

- Pitchers: 1 Yuki Matsui 10 Walker Buehler 22 Mason Miller 27 Nick Pivetta 34 Michael King 38 Robbie Ray 40 Jason Adam 44 Joe Musgrove 50 Adrián Morejón 66 David Morgan 72 Bradgley Rodríguez
- Catchers: 8 Ethan Salas 12 Luis Campusano 54 Freddy Fermin
- Infielders: 2 Xander Bogaerts 9 Jake Cronenworth 13 Manny Machado 25 Ty France 30 Gavin Sheets 41 Miguel Andújar
- Outfielders: 0 Samad Taylor 3 Jackson Merrill 4 Jase Bowen 15 Austin Hays 23 Fernando Tatís Jr. 29 Dustin Harris

National League Division Series

- Pitchers: 1 Yuki Matsui 10 Walker Buehler (games 3-4) 22 Mason Miller (games 1-2, 4) 27 Nick Pivetta 34 Michael King 38 Robbie Ray 40 Jason Adam 44 Joe Musgrove 50 Adrian Morejon 58 Wandy Peralta (game 3) 66 David Morgan 72 Bradgley Rodriguez 98 Randy Vásquez (games 1-2)
- Catchers: 8 Ethan Salas 12 Luis Campusano 54 Freddy Fermin
- Infielders: 2 Xander Bogaerts 9 Jake Cronenworth 13 Manny Machado 25 Ty France 30 Gavin Sheets 41 Miguel Andújar
- Outfielders: 0 Samad Taylor 3 Jackson Merrill 4 Jase Bowen 15 Austin Hays 23 Fernando Tatis Jr. 29 Dustin Harris

== Roster ==
2026 San Diego Padres
Roster
Pitchers: 40 Jason Adam; 76 Jhony Brito; 10 Walker Buehler; 17 Griffin Canning; 56 Jeremiah Estrada; 55 Lucas Giolito; 68 Kyle Hart; 37 Alek Jacob; 34 Michael King; 97 Ron Marinaccio; 33 Germán Márquez; 1 Yuki Matsui; 22 Mason Miller; 32 Casey Mize; 50 Adrián Morejón; 66 David Morgan; 58 Wandy Peralta; 27 Nick Pivetta; 38 Robbie Ray; 72 Bradgley Rodríguez; 38 JP Sears; 98 Randy Vásquez; 61 Matt Waldron	Catchers: 12 Luis Campusano; 48 Rodolfo Durán; 54 Freddy Fermín; 26 Blake Hunt; 8 Ethan Salas; Infielders: 41 Miguel Andújar; 2 Xander Bogaerts; 9 Jake Cronenworth; 25 Ty France; 13 Manny Machado; 30 Gavin Sheets; 24 Sung-mun Song; 7 Will Wagner	Outfielders: 4 Jase Bowen; 21 Nick Castellanos; 29 Dustin Harris; 15 Austin Hays; 29 Bryce Johnson; 5 Ramón Laureano; 28 Brandon Lockridge; 3 Jackson Merrill; 21 Luis Rengifo; 23 Fernando Tatís Jr.; 0 Samad Taylor; 99 Gage Workman; Other batters: 15 Nick Solak	Manager: 14 Craig Stammen; Coaches: 86 Heberto Andrade (bullpen catcher/coaching assistant); 88 Chris Apecechea (assistant pitching); 81 Morgan Burkhart (major league coaching assistant); 82 Brian Esposito (major league coach); 53 Ben Fritz (bullpen); 81 Ryan Goins (infield); 70 Robby Hammock (field coordinator); 20 Bob Henley (third base/infield and base running instructor); 49 Randy Knorr (bench); 46 David Macias (first base/outfield and base running instructor); 89 Mike McCoy (assistant hitting); 57 Ruben Niebla (pitching); 85 Pat O'Sullivan (assistant hitting); 82 Kevin Plawecki (catching); 80 Nick Punto (major league coach); -- Scott Servais (coaching assistant); 28 Steven Souza Jr. (hitting); 87 Scott Stroud (coaching assistant); 83 Peter Summerville (game planning/coaching assistant)

== Player stats ==
= Indicates team leader

= Indicates league leader

=== Batting ===
Note: G = Games played; AB = At bats; R = Runs scored; H = Hits; 2B = Doubles; 3B = Triples; HR = Home runs; RBI = Runs batted in; SB = Stolen bases; BB = Walks; AVG = Batting average; SLG = Slugging average

Player	G	AB	R	H	2B	3B	HR	RBI	SB	BB	AVG	SLG
Fernando Tatís, Jr.	159	626	96	181	32	3	25	83	38	64	.289	.470
Jackson Merrill	158	613	86	156	26	5	26	87	27	41	.254	.440
Manny Machado	158	589	82	128	22	0	30	91	5	76	.217	.407
Xander Bogaerts	153	520	68	120	18	1	13	57	22	77	.231	.344
Ty France	133	440	59	130	24	1	21	72	1	37	.295	.502
Jake Cronenworth	109	377	46	85	13	1	7	41	9	38	.225	.321
Gavin Sheets	125	363	47	77	16	0	17	48	4	49	.212	.397
Miguel Andújar	74	239	24	62	20	2	5	22	2	11	.259	.423
Freddy Fermin	96	232	22	47	14	0	4	24	1	21	.203	.315
Luis Campusano	71	215	24	57	12	0	8	30	0	30	.265	.433
Ramon Laureano	53	182	23	37	6	2	7	21	7	20	.203	.374
Samad Taylor	47	152	26	48	4	2	2	18	13	18	.316	.408
Sung-mun Song	78	131	22	25	4	0	1	17	13	19	.191	.244
Luis Rengifo	38	127	19	37	3	0	4	17	3	15	.291	.409
Nick Castellanos	39	115	9	22	5	0	4	20	2	5	.191	.339
Jase Bowen	83	96	14	14	2	1	2	7	6	3	.146	.250
Dustin Harris	28	90	18	29	3	3	0	14	6	5	.322	.422
Rodolfo Durán	38	82	8	12	4	0	3	8	0	7	.146	.305
Austin Hays	26	57	13	18	2	0	2	8	0	3	.316	.456
Bryce Johnson	32	45	5	8	2	0	0	2	5	3	.178	.222
Ethan Salas	16	39	6	10	0	1	2	5	0	1	.256	.462
Will Wagner	16	35	5	9	1	0	0	0	0	10	.257	.286
Nick Solak	10	7	0	1	0	0	0	1	0	1	.143	.143
Blake Hunt	2	3	0	0	0	0	0	0	0	0	.000	.000
Gage Workman	2	3	0	1	1	0	0	3	0	0	.333	.667
Randy Vásquez	1	1	0	0	0	0	0	0	0	0	.000	.000
Totals	162	5379	722	1314	234	23	183	696	164	554	.244	.398

=== Pitching ===
Note: W = Wins; L= Losses; ERA = Earned run average; G = Games pitched; GS = Games started; SV = Saves; IP = Innings pitched; H = Hits allowed; R = Runs allowed; ER = Earned runs allowed; BB = Walks allowed; SO = Strikeouts

Player	W	L	ERA	G	GS	SV	IP	H	R	ER	BB	SO
Michael King	12	10	3.21	32	32	0	185.0	148	68	66	70	159
Walker Buehler	9	6	4.63	32	32	0	153.2	150	81	79	57	131
Randy Vásquez	10	6	3.90	32	23	0	140.2	141	65	61	37	87
Griffin Canning	5	9	5.68	30	11	0	88.2	94	57	56	41	87
Adrián Morejón	9	3	2.83	76	0	3	86.0	65	32	27	28	107
Wandy Peralta	3	3	3.61	65	5	0	77.1	79	31	31	23	50
Bradgley Rodríguez	4	3	2.19	68	4	2	74.0	59	25	18	20	81
Mason Miller	5	2	1.67	66	0	38	70.0	37	16	13	26	129
Kyle Hart	1	3	4.92	46	4	0	64.0	51	37	35	26	59
Yuki Matsui	5	1	1.83	54	0	1	64.0	37	14	13	36	68
Germán Márquez	4	2	5.26	13	10	1	53.0	55	32	31	24	37
Ron Marinaccio	1	0	4.79	33	0	0	47.0	50	25	25	18	38
Casey Mize	2	4	7.46	10	10	0	44.2	56	42	37	19	25
Robbie Ray	3	2	5.02	9	9	0	43.0	39	24	24	27	33
Nick Pivetta	3	2	2.86	8	8	0	34.2	27	11	11	8	42
Jason Adam	2	2	2.62	38	0	2	34.1	30	10	10	10	22
David Morgan	4	1	3.78	32	0	0	33.1	37	16	14	22	39
Matt Waldron	1	2	7.16	10	3	0	32.2	43	26	26	8	28
JP Sears	3	4	4.68	8	6	0	32.2	33	19	17	11	25
Jeremiah Estrada	2	3	3.48	33	0	1	31.0	20	16	12	16	38
Lucas Giolito	2	3	5.16	7	5	0	29.2	32	19	17	23	18
Jhony Brito	0	0	3.00	5	0	0	9.0	7	3	3	1	6
Alek Jacob	1	0	5.40	3	0	0	5.0	5	3	3	2	6
Rodolfo Duran	0	0	27.00	2	0	0	3.0	9	9	9	1	0
Totals	91	71	3.98	162	162	48	1436.1	1304	681	636	554	1315

== Farm system ==
Level	Team	League	Manager	W	L	Position
Triple-A	El Paso Chihuahuas	Pacific Coast League	Pete Zamora	25	50	5th (East)
Double-A	San Antonio Missions	Texas League	Chris Tremie	28	41	5th (South)
High-A	Fort Wayne TinCaps	Midwest League	Jon Mathews	29	35	4th (East)
Low-A	Lake Elsinore Storm	California League	Brallan Perez	66	65	California League Champions
Rookie	ACL Padres	Arizona Complex League		34	26	2nd (West)
Rookie	DSL Padres Gold	Dominican Summer League		40	16	Dominican Summer League Champions
Rookie	DSL Padres Brown	Dominican Summer League		11	44	6th (West)
