= Luis Patiño =

Luis Patiño may refer to:

- Luis Patiño (tennis) (born 1993), Mexican tennis player
- Luis Patiño (baseball) (born 1999), Colombian baseball player
