= Blake Snell =

American baseball player (born 1992)

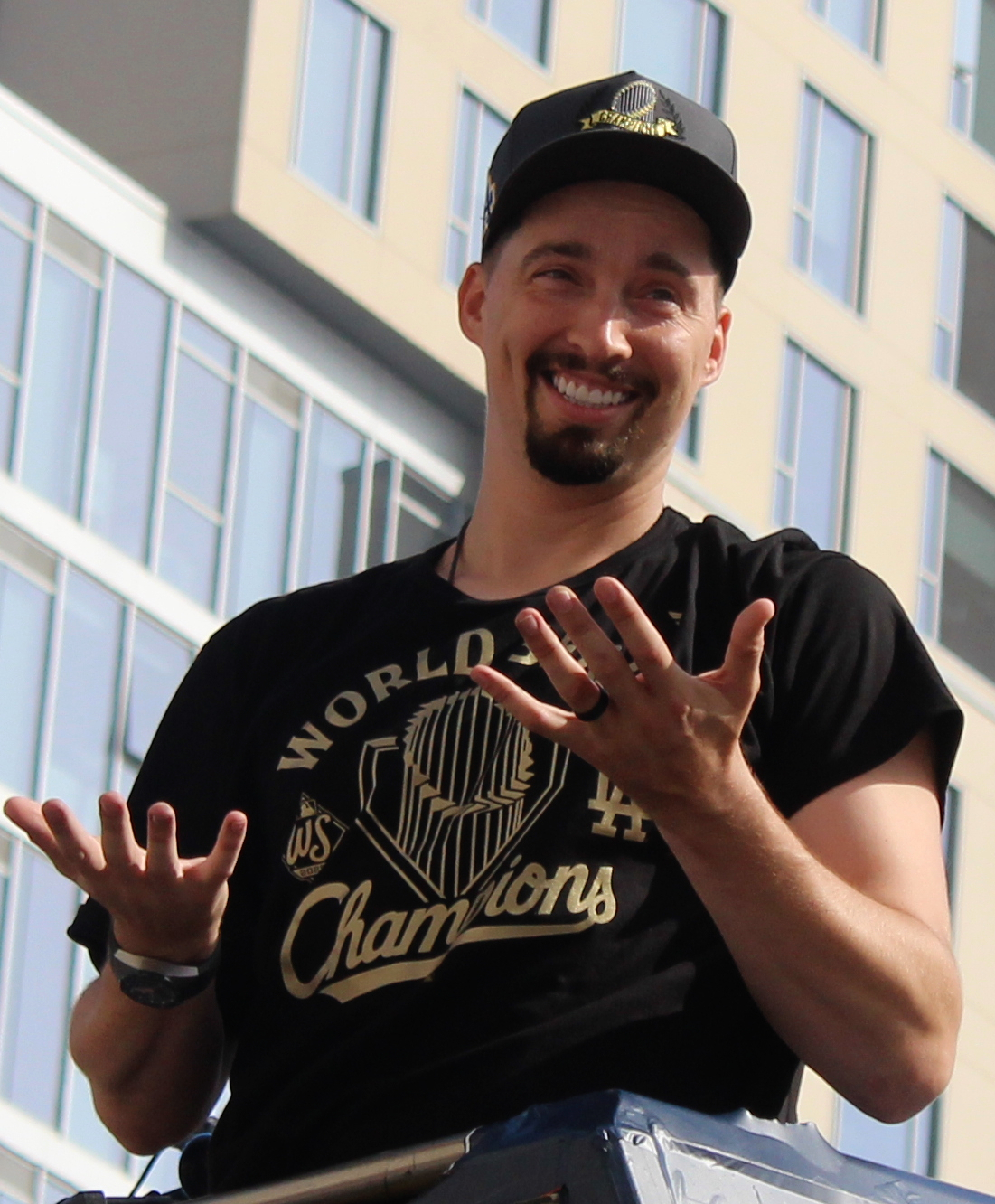
- Snell at the Dodgers parade in 2025

Los Angeles Dodgers – No. 7
- Pitcher
- Born: December 4, 1992 (age 33); Seattle, Washington, U.S.
- Bats: Left Throws: Left

MLB debut
- April 23, 2016, for the Tampa Bay Rays

MLB statistics (through 2026 season)
- Win–loss record: 85–63
- Earned run average: 3.10
- Strikeouts: 1,495
- Stats at Baseball Reference

Teams
- Tampa Bay Rays (2016–2020); San Diego Padres (2021–2023); San Francisco Giants (2024); Los Angeles Dodgers (2025–present)

Career highlights and awards
- All-Star (2018); World Series champion (2025); 2× Cy Young Award (2018, 2023); All-MLB First Team (2023); AL wins leader (2018); 2× ERA leader (2018, 2023); Pitched a no-hitter on August 2, 2024

Blake Ashton Snell (born December 4, 1992) is an American professional baseball pitcher for the Los Angeles Dodgers of Major League Baseball (MLB). He has previously played in MLB for the Tampa Bay Rays, San Diego Padres, and San Francisco Giants.

Snell was selected by the Rays in the first round of the 2011 MLB draft and made his MLB debut with them in 2016. He won the American League (AL) Cy Young Award in 2018, when he was an All-Star and led the league in both wins and earned run average (ERA). The Rays traded Snell to the Padres before the 2021 season and he won his second Cy Young Award in 2023.

Snell signed with the Giants in 2024. He threw a no-hitter on August 2 against the Cincinnati Reds. He began a five-year contract with the Dodgers in 2025. He was a part of the team's 2025 World Series championship over the Toronto Blue Jays.

== Early life ==
Blake Ashton Snell was born on December 4, 1992, in Seattle, Washington. Snell attended Shorewood High School in Shoreline, Washington, where he played for the baseball team. In high school, he trained at a facility owned by his father, a former minor league baseball player. In his senior season, Snell recorded a 9–0 win–loss record, a 1.00 earned run average (ERA) with 128 strikeouts in over 63 innings pitched.

== Professional career ==
=== Draft and minor leagues ===
The Tampa Bay Rays selected Snell in the first round of the 2011 Major League Baseball draft. He signed with the Rays for a $684,000 bonus and made his professional debut with the Gulf Coast Rays, where he was 1–2 with a 3.08 ERA in 11 games (eight starts). He spent 2012 with the Princeton Rays, pitching to a 5–1 record and a 2.09 ERA in 11 starts, and 2013 with the Bowling Green Hot Rods where he compiled a 4–9 record and a 4.27 ERA in 23 starts.

Snell started 2014 with Bowling Green and was promoted to the Charlotte Stone Crabs in May. On August 2, he pitched a rain-shortened no-hitter against the Daytona Cubs, it was the first no-hitter in Stone Crabs history. In 24 total games started between the two clubs, he was 8–8 with a 3.19 ERA. After the season, he was named the Rays Minor League Pitcher of the Year. Snell started 2015 with the Stone Crabs and was promoted to the Montgomery Biscuits after allowing no runs in 21 innings to start the season. He was later promoted to the Durham Bulls. In 25 games (23 starts) between the three clubs, he was 15–4 with a 1.41 ERA and a 1.02 WHIP and he was named the USA Today Minor League Pitcher of the Year. The Rays added him to their 40-man roster after the season. Snell began the 2016 season with Durham, where he made 12 starts and was 3–5 with a 3.29 ERA.

=== Tampa Bay Rays (2016–2020) ===
==== 2016–2017 ====
Snell was promoted to the major leagues to make his debut on April 23, 2016, at Yankee Stadium. He allowed a run off of a wild pitch in the first inning, but he calmed down after that, striking out the side in the second inning, and retired 12 of the last 14 batters he faced. His first major league strikeout was of Brian McCann. He picked up his first career major league win on June 27, when he allowed four runs in 5 1/3 innings against the Boston Red Sox. Through the 2016 season for Tampa, Snell made 19 starts, finishing with a 6–8 record, 3.54 ERA, and 98 strikeouts over 89 innings.

At the beginning of the 2017 season, Snell failed to work into the sixth inning in almost all of his first eight games and was routinely touching 100 pitches in the fourth inning. After posting an ERA of 4.71 through eight starts in 2017, he was demoted to Durham on May 13. On June 28, Snell was recalled and went 5–1 with a 3.31 ERA to finish the season with 24 starts, recording 119 strikeouts over 129 1/3 innings with a 4.04 ERA.

==== 2018 ====
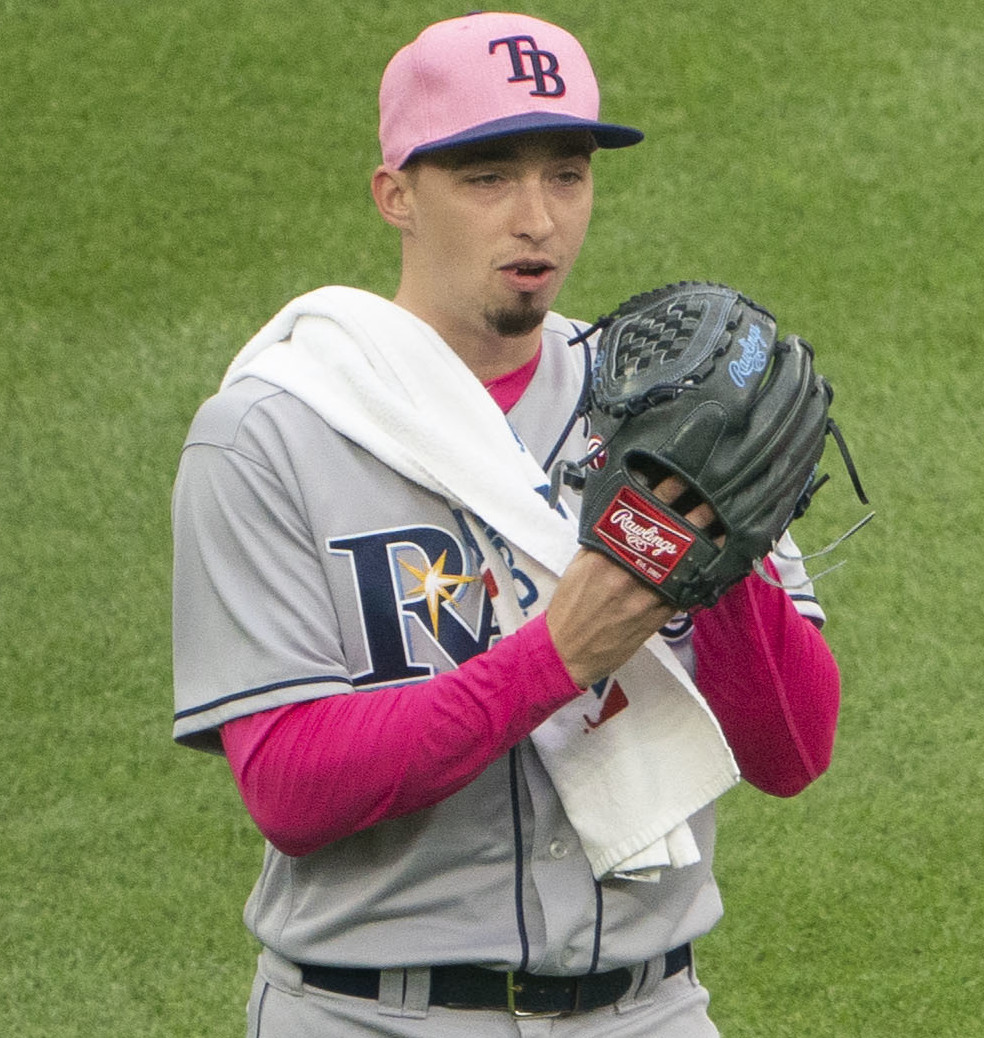
Snell in 2018

Snell opened the 2018 season in the Rays starting rotation. On June 3, he tied an AL record by striking out the first seven batters he faced in a game against the Seattle Mariners at Safeco Field. Snell ended the game allowing no runs in six innings and recorded 12 strikeouts. This was his first career start at Safeco Field in front of many of his friends and family, an estimated 300, including the first professional start witnessed by his grandfather, whom he considers a mentor.

At the time of the All-Star team announcement, Snell was 12–4 with a 2.09 ERA, the lowest of all qualified pitchers in the American League. Despite his success, he was not named to the original AL roster. This led to wide criticism of the selection process by players, coaches, fans, and analysts. After Corey Kluber opted out of the All-Star game due to injury, Snell was named his replacement, ending the controversy and awarding him his first career All-Star appearance.

On July 23, Snell was put on the 10-day disabled list with shoulder fatigue. He was reactivated on August 4 against the Chicago White Sox. On August 21, Snell set a new MLB record with his 13th straight start allowing one earned run or fewer at home After he allowed two runs at home against the Baltimore Orioles, his streak ended at 14. and he was the American League Pitcher of the Month for August, during which he went 4–0 with a 1.08 ERA over five starts.

On September 18, Snell recorded his 20th victory on the season, becoming the first Ray to accomplish this since David Price in 2012. On September 23, he won his 21st game, setting a franchise record after pitching 6 2/3 scoreless innings with 11 strikeouts against the Toronto Blue Jays. He was again named the American League Pitcher of the Month for September, in which he went 5–0 with a 1.26 ERA and 53 strikeouts over 35 2/3 innings. Snell became the youngest pitcher to win the award in consecutive months since Johan Santana in 2004.

Snell finished his breakout season leading the majors in wins (21), adjusted ERA+ (219), and batting average against (.178), as well as leading the American League in earned run average (1.89) and wins above replacement among pitchers (7.5). His 1.89 ERA was the lowest in the American League since Pedro Martinez posted a 1.74 in 2000, and the third-lowest in the AL since the designated hitter was introduced in 1973. He allowed two or fewer runs in 27 of his 31 starts and one or zero runs in 21 starts. Against the American League's five playoff teams, he went 9–2 with a 2.00 ERA. He led all major league pitchers in left on base percentage, stranding 88.0% of base runners. For the season, he also had the lowest percentage of balls pulled against him (33.8%) among major league pitchers, and led major league pitchers in lowest contact percentage (66.6%).

On November 14, Snell won the American League Cy Young Award, topping runner-up Justin Verlander by 15 points (169–154) and receiving 17 of 30 first-place votes. He became the second Rays pitcher to win the award, after Price in 2012.

==== 2019 ====
On March 21, 2019, Snell agreed to a five-year contract worth $50 million to keep him with the Rays through the 2023 season; it was the largest deal given to a major league pitcher before they reached salary arbitration. In spring training, he was named the Opening Day starter. His first win that season was a 4–0 victory over the Colorado Rockies on April 2, pitching 13 strikeouts and just two hits in seven innings. On April 16, he was placed on the injured list after breaking a toe on his right foot while moving furniture in his bathroom, and missed two starts. On July 25, it was announced that he would undergo arthroscopic surgery to remove loose bodies from his left elbow. Due to multiple trips to the disabled list, Snell finished with a 6–8 record in 23 starts. He struck out 147 batters in 107 innings.

Snell made his first career postseason appearance when he started Game 2 of the American League Division Series against the Houston Astros and he also pitched in relief in the fourth and fifth games of the series, earning the save in Game 4. In 5 1/3 innings in the series, he allowed one run on four hits with seven strikeouts.

==== 2020 ====
Before the start of the delayed MLB season, Snell caused some controversy when he said that he was more concerned about his pay than health when it came to decisions to return to play during the COVID-19 pandemic. He said, "I'm not playing unless I get mine ... That's just the way it is for me," later admitting that his words could be taken as selfish. Commentators said his remarks were seen as "outrageously out-of-touch" during the pandemic. In the pandemic-shortened season, Snell was 4–2 with a 3.24 ERA. He tied the record for the AL lead in wild pitches, with seven.

Snell started the first game of the postseason against the Toronto Blue Jays in the Wild Card Series, taking a no-hitter into the 6th inning as the Rays won. He then started Game 1 of the Division Series against the New York Yankees, allowing four runs through five innings. Snell started both Games 1 and 6 of the American League Championship Series against the Astros. He allowed one run through five innings in Game 1 and two runs through four innings in Game 6. In Game 2 of the 2020 World Series against the Los Angeles Dodgers, Snell allowed two runs and struck out nine batters in 4 2/3 innings. He became the first player in World Series history to strike out nine or more batters in fewer than five innings pitched. His nine strikeouts set a franchise postseason record and the Rays won the game 6–4 In Game 6 with the Rays leading 1–0 with one out, Snell was pulled by Kevin Cash for Nick Anderson in the 6th inning after pitching a shutout with two hits and nine strikeouts. The Dodgers then scored two runs that inning and would go on to win the game 3–1 and the World Series, resulting in criticism by fans and baseball media.

=== San Diego Padres (2021–2023) ===
==== 2021 ====
On December 29, 2020, the Rays traded Snell to the San Diego Padres in exchange for prospects Luis Patiño, Blake Hunt, and Cole Wilcox, along with catcher Francisco Mejía. Snell regressed a bit in 2021, as he ended the year with a 7–6 record and a 4.20 ERA over 27 starts. Snell initially had trouble going deep into games, not completing six innings until his ninth start of the year. After two more starts where he failed to get out of the fourth inning, Snell pitched seven shut-out innings against the Mets on June 4, giving up only one hit. Snell missed a pair of starts in the summer due to a bout with food poisoning. Snell finished strong, posting a 1.83 ERA in his final eight starts of the year, including seven innings of no-hit ball against the Diamondbacks on August 31. He left his September 12 start early due to left adductor tightness. He was placed on the injured list the following day, and he would not return.

==== 2022 ====
Snell's preparations for the 2022 season were interrupted by the lockout, and he was behind the other starting pitchers in building innings in spring training. In his first scheduled start of the regular season, Snell again felt adductor tightness while warming up in the bullpen and he did not pitch in the game. After going to the injured list, Snell returned to the starting rotation on May 18, pitching 3 2/3 innings against the Phillies. With Snell's return, the Padres opted to go with a 6-man rotation to keep MacKenzie Gore in the starting line-up and lower stress on arms. He made 24 starts in 2022, with an 8–10 record and 3.38 ERA. He made three starts in the postseason, one in each round the Padres completed in. He allowed two runs on four hits in 3 1/3 innings in the Wild Card Series, one run on four hits in 5 1/3 innings in the Division Series, and four runs on five hits in five innings in the National League Championship Series.

==== 2023 ====
In 2023, Snell made 32 starts with a 14–9 record and 234 strikeouts in 180 innings pitched. His ERA of 2.25 and hits-per-nine-innings (H/9) of 5.8 were the best in Major League Baseball, as was his ERA+ of 182; at the same time, his 99 walks also led the Majors. Additionally, he led all NL pitchers in WAR (6.0), second-most in the Majors behind Yankees pitcher Gerrit Cole (7.5). On November 14, Snell rejected a $20.25 million qualifying offer from the Padres and chose to become a free agent. The next day, he won the 2023 NL Cy Young Award, receiving 28 out of 30 first-place votes. It was Snell's second Cy Young Award, and he was the seventh pitcher in MLB history to receive the award in both leagues.

=== San Francisco Giants (2024) ===
On March 19, 2024, Snell signed a two-year, $62 million contract with the San Francisco Giants that contained an opt-out after the first year. He made his debut on April 8, 2024, against the Washington Nationals, pitching in three innings and allowing three earned runs, taking the loss.

Snell made two more starts in April before spending two stints on the injured list (plus paternity leave), making only three starts between April 20 and July 8. On July 27 at Oracle Park, against the Colorado Rockies, Snell struck out a career-high 15 batters over six scoreless innings. It was the most strikeouts in six or fewer innings in MLB history.

In his next start on August 2 against the Cincinnati Reds at Great American Ball Park, Snell pitched a no-hitter in a 3–0 win, his first win as a Giant. Snell struck out eleven batters and allowed only three base runners. It was also the first time he had completed pitching eight innings and ever pitched into the ninth inning in his major league career. He threw 114 pitches in the game, which was just short of his career high of 117. On the season, he was 5–3 with a 3.12 ERA in 20 starts.

On November 1, 2024, Snell opted out of his contract with the Giants and became a free agent.

=== Los Angeles Dodgers (2025–present) ===
On November 30, 2024, Snell signed a five-year contract worth $182 million with the Los Angeles Dodgers, which included a $52 million signing bonus and a conditional $10 million option for 2030. He made his Dodgers debut as the starting pitcher for Opening Day on March 27, 2025, against the Detroit Tigers, pitching five innings, allowing two earned runs and walked four, while striking out two batters, taking the win. After two starts, he was placed on the injured list for shoulder inflammation. He did not rejoin the Dodgers' active roster until August 2. He made 11 starts for the Dodgers in 2025, his lowest total since the pandemic shortened 2020 season, with a 5–4 record, 2.35 ERA, and 72 strikeouts.

Snell started the Dodgers playoff opener against the Cincinnati Reds in the Wild Card Series, allowing two runs in seven innings, while striking out nine. He then pitched six shutout innings, on only one hit, while striking out nine again, in the second game of the 2025 NLDS against the Philadelphia Phillies. In the opening game of the NLCS against the Milwaukee Brewers, Snell struck out 10 and faced the minimum number of batters in eight shutout innings, allowing just one base runner on one hit, who was quickly picked off on the base paths.

Snell struggled in his 2025 World Series outings against the Toronto Blue Jays. In Game 1, he gave up five runs, including three of the nine Toronto had in the sixth inning, on eight hits and three walks while only striking out four. In his second start of the series, in Game 5, he allowed back-to-back homers to Davis Schneider and Vladimir Guerrero Jr. to begin the game, the first back-to-back leadoff homers ever in a Series game. He finished with five runs over 6 2/3 innings pitched with six hits, four walks, and seven strikeouts. He pitched 1 1/3 scoreless innings in relief in Game 7, as the Dodgers clinched the World Series championship to give him his first career championship.

Snell began the 2026 season on the injured list with shoulder fatigue and did not join the Dodgers until May 9, where he made one start and allowed five runs in four innings pitched against the Atlanta Braves. On May 15, he returned to the injured list when loose bodies were discovered in his pitching elbow. He did not rejoin the Dodgers until August 11 and as a result only made eight more starts on the season, finishing with a 4–1 record and 1.90 ERA with 55 strikeouts in 42 2/3 innings.

== Personal life ==
Snell grew up a Seattle Mariners fan. His nickname "Snellzilla" originally belonged to his oldest brother, but he seized it for himself at age eleven.

Snell owned a home in St. Petersburg, Florida, but sold it in 2021. He resides in Lynnwood, Washington. Snell and Haeley Mar, his wife, had a son in June 2024, and another son in August 2025.

== See also ==
- List of highest-paid Major League Baseball players
- List of Major League Baseball annual ERA leaders
- List of Major League Baseball annual shutout leaders
- List of Major League Baseball annual wins leaders
- List of San Francisco Giants no-hitters
- List of Tampa Bay Rays team records
- List of World Series starting pitchers
- San Diego Padres award winners and league leaders
- Tampa Bay Rays award winners and league leaders

Awards and achievements
| Preceded by Chris Sale; Michael Wacha; Freddy Peralta; Dylan Cease | Major League Baseball Pitcher of the Month; August—September 2018; June 2023; September 2023; August 2024 | Succeeded by Tyler Glasnow; Corbin Burnes; Ranger Suárez; Nick Martinez |
| Preceded by Dylan Cease | No-hitter pitcher August 2, 2024 | Succeeded by Shota Imanaga, Nate Pearson, & Porter Hodge |
