= Francisco Mejía =

Dominican baseball player (born 1995)

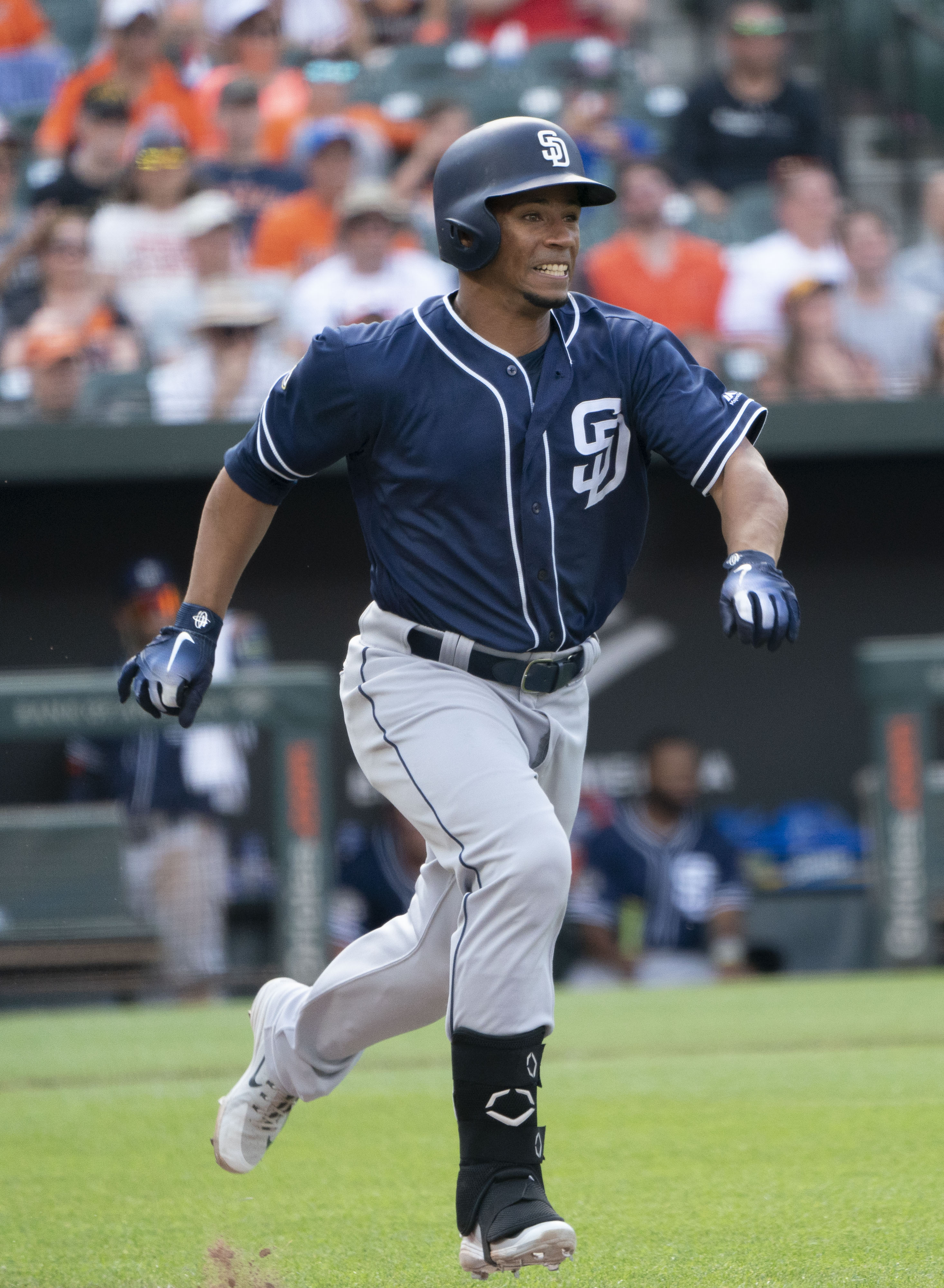
- Mejía with the San Diego Padres in 2019

Diablos Rojos del México – No. 18
- Catcher
- Born: October 27, 1995 (age 30); Baní, Peravia, Dominican Republic
- Bats: Switch Throws: Right

MLB debut
- September 1, 2017, for the Cleveland Indians

MLB statistics (through 2023 season)
- Batting average: .239
- Home runs: 29
- Runs batted in: 118
- Stats at Baseball Reference

Teams
- Cleveland Indians (2017–2018); San Diego Padres (2018–2020); Tampa Bay Rays (2021–2023)

Francisco José Mejía (born October 27, 1995) is a Dominican professional baseball catcher for the Diablos Rojos del México of the Mexican League. He has previously played in Major League Baseball (MLB) for the Cleveland Indians, San Diego Padres, and Tampa Bay Rays.

== Career ==
Mejía was born in Bani, Dominican Republic. He studied at Las Carreras de Baní. Mejía is represented by the sports agency Independent Sports & Entertainment (ISE).

=== Cleveland Indians ===
In July 2012, Mejía signed with the Cleveland Indians for over $100,000 as a non-drafted international free agent. He made his professional debut in 2013 with the Arizona Indians of the Rookie-level Arizona League with whom he spent the season, batting .205 with four home runs and 24 RBIs in 30 games. In 2014, he played for the Mahoning Valley Scrappers of the Low–A New York-Penn League where he posted a .282 batting average with two home runs and 36 RBIs in 66 games. He spent 2015 with the Lake County Captains of the Single–A Midwest League; there, he batted .243/.324/.345 with nine home runs and 53 RBIs.

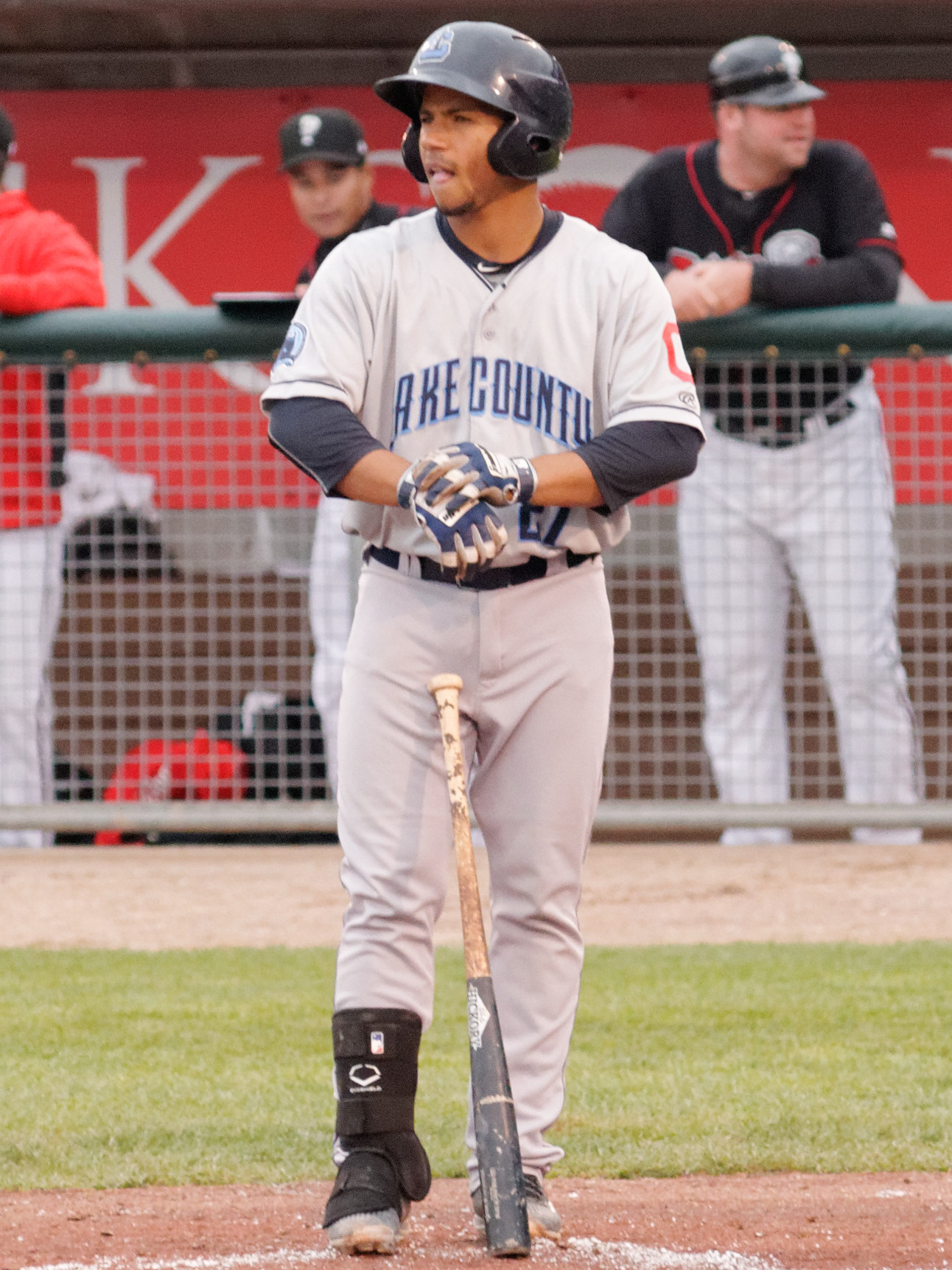
Mejía with the Lake County Captains in 2016

In 2016, Mejía began the season again with Lake County, and was promoted to the Lynchburg Hillcats of the High–A Carolina League in June. At the time of his promotion, Mejía was in the midst of a hitting streak that had reached 24 games. His hitting streak lasted for 50 games, and was the fourth-longest streak in the history of Minor League Baseball. He was reported to be involved in a trade to the Milwaukee Brewers for Jonathan Lucroy; however, the trade fell apart after Lucroy would not waive his no-trade clause. In 102 total games between Lake County and Lynchburg, he posted a combined .342 batting average with 11 home runs, 80 RBIs and an .896 OPS. The Indians added him to their 40-man roster after the season. In 2016-17 he played for the Estrellas de Oriente of the Dominican Winter League, and batted .227/.217/.227 in nine games.

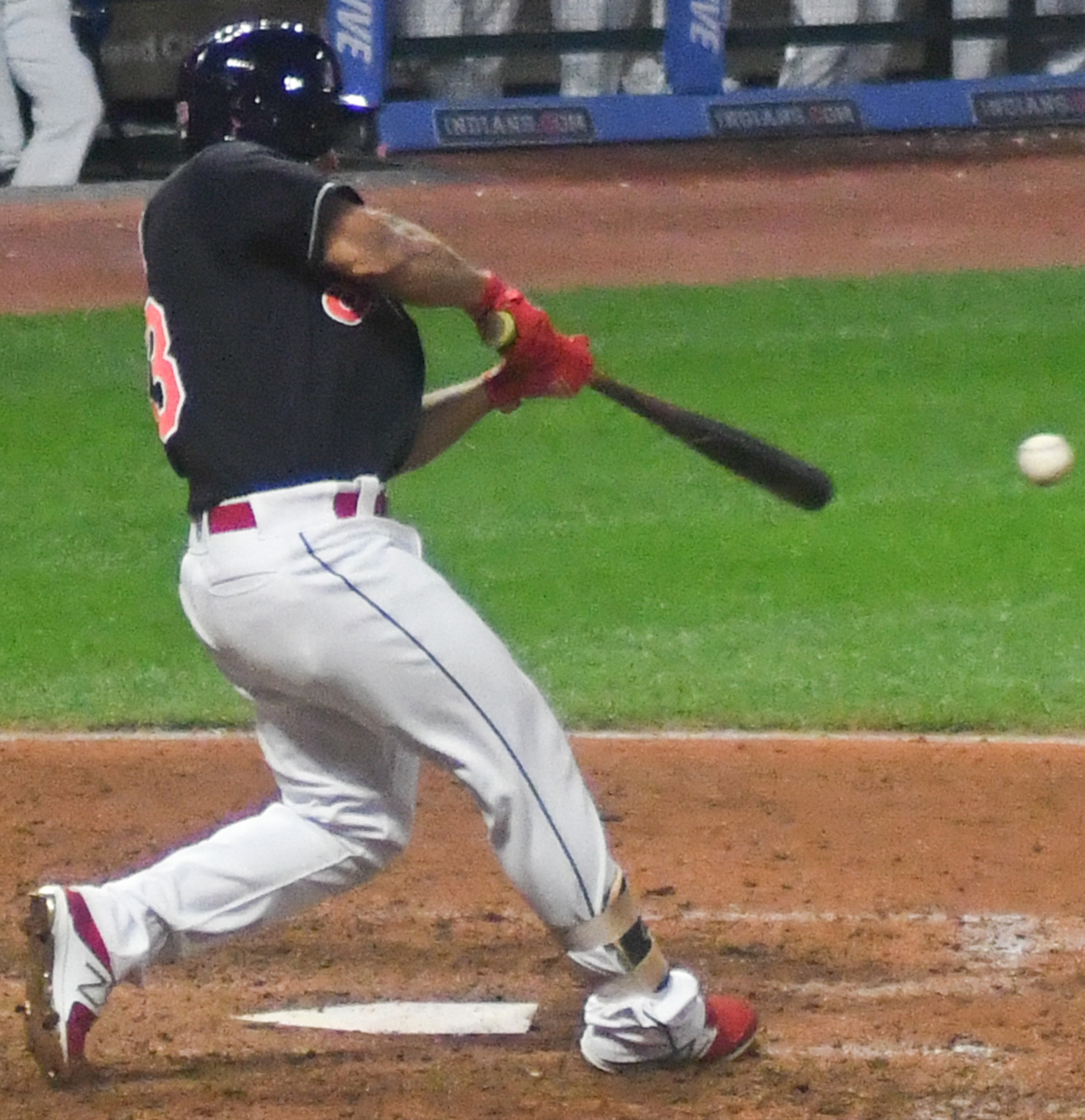
Mejía batting for the Cleveland Indians in 2017

Mejía began the 2017 season with the Akron RubberDucks of the Double–A Eastern League. After batting .297 with 14 home runs and 52 RBIs, he was called up to the major leagues for the first time on September 1, 2017. In the Major Leagues for the 2017 season, he batted .154/.214/.154 in 11 games.

MLB.com ranked Mejía as Cleveland's top prospect going into the 2018 season. He began the 2018 season with the Columbus Clippers of the Triple–A International League.

=== San Diego Padres ===
Mejía was traded to the San Diego Padres in exchange for Brad Hand and Adam Cimber on July 19, 2018. The Padres assigned him to the El Paso Chihuahuas of the Pacific Coast League. The Padres recalled Mejía from the minors on September 4, 2018.

In 2019, he had the best arm of all major league catchers (88.6). Mejia struggled to find playing time throughout his time in San Diego, putting up a slash line of 185/.241/.389 in just 20 games in 2018. While he received more playing time in 2019, he was given a chance to prove himself and he was around league average, putting up an OPS+ at 99. In the 2020 season, Mejia played in just 17 games, while being on the injured list for a month with a bruised thumb. He struggled in 2020, putting up a .322 OPS and mustering just 3 hits in 39 at bats.

=== Tampa Bay Rays ===
On December 29, 2020, Mejía, along with prospects Luis Patiño, Blake Hunt, and Cole Wilcox, was traded to the Tampa Bay Rays in exchange for Blake Snell. In 2021, Mejía played in 84 games, hitting .260/.322/.416 with 6 home runs and a career–high 35 RBI.

Mejía had 289 at–bats over 93 games in 2022 and slashed .242/.264/.381 with nearly identical home run and RBI tallies as the previous season, with 6 and 31, respectively.

Mejía played in 50 games for the Rays in 2023, hitting .227/.258/.400 with 5 home runs and 19 RBI. After a brief stint on the injured list, Mejía was activated on August 22, 2023, and subsequently designated for assignment. On August 28, Mejía cleared waivers and was sent outright to the Triple–A Durham Bulls. On October 5, Mejía elected free agency.

On December 22, 2023, Mejía signed a minor league contract with the Los Angeles Angels. However, he was released by the Angels on February 25, 2024. Four days later, he re-signed with the Rays on a minor league contract but they released him on March 27.

=== Milwaukee Brewers ===
On April 5, 2024, Mejía signed a minor league contract with the Milwaukee Brewers. In 90 games for the Triple-A Nashville Sounds, he batted .274/.348/.428 with 11 home runs and 55 RBI. Mejía elected free agency following the season on November 4.

=== Diablos Rojos del México ===
On January 28, 2025, Mejía signed with the Diablos Rojos del México of the Mexican League. In 44 appearances for México, Mejía batted .341/.363/.526 with five home runs, 46 RBI, and two stolen bases.

=== Washington Nationals ===
On June 30, 2025, Mejía signed a minor league contract with the Washington Nationals. In 42 appearances for the Triple-A Rochester Red Wings, he batted .215/.258/.362 with six home runs, 19 RBI, and two stolen bases. Mejía elected free agency following the season on November 6.

=== Diablos Rojos del México (second stint) ===
On February 3, 2026, Mejía signed with the Diablos Rojos del México of the Mexican League.
