= Blake Hunt =

American baseball player (born 1998)

Philadelphia Phillies
- Catcher
- Born: November 10, 1998 (age 28); Costa Mesa, California, U.S.
- Bats: Right Throws: Right

MLB debut
- June 19, 2026, for the San Diego Padres

MLB statistics (through 2026 season)
- Batting average: .000
- Home runs: 0
- Runs batted in: 0
- Stats at Baseball Reference

Teams
- San Diego Padres (2026)

Blake Evan Hunt (born November 10, 1998) is an American professional baseball catcher in the Philadelphia Phillies organization. He has previously played in Major League Baseball (MLB) for the San Diego Padres.

== Career ==
=== Amateur career ===
Hunt attended Mater Dei High School in Santa Ana, California. He played for the school's baseball team, and batted .394 with six home runs, 28 runs batted in (RBIs), and nine doubles as a senior in 2017.

=== San Diego Padres ===
The San Diego Padres selected Hunt in the second round of the 2017 Major League Baseball draft. He signed for $1.6 million, forgoing his commitment to play college baseball for the Pepperdine Waves baseball team.

Hunt made his professional debut with the Arizona League Padres, batting .241 over thirty games. He spent the 2018 season with the Tri-City Dust Devils where he hit .271 with three home runs and 25 RBI over 56 games, and he played 2019 with the Fort Wayne TinCaps, slashing .255/.331/.381 with five home runs and 39 RBI over 89 games. Hunt did not play in a game in 2020 due to the cancellation of the minor league season because of the COVID-19 pandemic.

=== Tampa Bay Rays ===
On December 29, 2020, the Padres traded Hunt, Francisco Mejía, Luis Patiño, and Cole Wilcox to the Tampa Bay Rays for Blake Snell. He split the 2021 season between the Bowling Green Hot Rods and the Montgomery Biscuits, slashing .205/.288/.375 with nine home runs and 48 RBI in 76 games.

In 67 games split between Double–A Montgomery and the Triple–A Durham Bulls in 2023, Hunt hit a combined .256/.331/.484 with 12 home runs and 41 RBI.

=== Seattle Mariners ===
On November 6, 2023, Hunt was traded to the Seattle Mariners in exchange for Tatem Levins; he was subsequently added to Seattle's 40-man roster following the trade. Hunt was optioned to the Triple–A Tacoma Rainiers to begin the 2024 season. In 23 games for Tacoma, he batted .293/.372/.533 with four home runs and 20 RBI.

=== Baltimore Orioles ===
On May 22, 2024, Hunt was traded to the Baltimore Orioles in exchange for Mike Baumann and Michael Pérez. On July 30, Hunt was promoted to the major leagues for the first time. He did not make an appearance and was optioned back to the Triple–A Norfolk Tides the next day, becoming a phantom ballplayer. In 42 games for the Tides, Hunt batted .179/.219/.278 with three home runs, seven RBI, and one stolen base. He was designated for assignment following the signing of Andrew Kittredge on January 13, 2025.

=== Seattle Mariners (second stint) ===
On January 15, 2025, Hunt was traded to the Seattle Mariners in exchange for cash considerations. He was optioned to the Triple-A Tacoma Rainiers to begin the season. In 25 appearances for Tacoma, Hunt batted .231/.271/.407 with two home runs and five RBI. Hunt was designated for assignment by Seattle on May 29, and was sent outright to Tacoma after clearing waivers on June 1. Hunt elected free agency following the season on November 6.

=== San Diego Padres (second stint) ===
On December 16, 2025, Hunt signed a minor league contract with the San Diego Padres. On March 2, 2026, Hunt was shut down due to an oblique injury. After returning to health, he was assigned to the Triple-A El Paso Chihuahuas, where he batted .269/.374/.462 with one home run and five RBI across eight appearances. On June 14, the Padres promoted Hunt to the major leagues following an injury to Freddy Fermin. On June 19, Hunt made his debut coming in as a defensive replacement for catcher Rodolfo Durán after he was pinch hit for by Nick Solak in the top of the eighth inning against the Texas Rangers. On September 7, Hunt was designated for assignment by San Diego. He was released by the Padres the following day.

=== Philadelphia Phillies ===
On November 17, 2026, Hunt signed a minor league contract with the Philadelphia Phillies.
