= Cole Wilcox =

American baseball player (born 1999)

Seattle Mariners – No. 43
- Pitcher
- Born: July 14, 1999 (age 27); Chattanooga, Tennessee, U.S.
- Bats: Right Throws: Right

MLB debut
- September 19, 2025, for the Tampa Bay Rays

MLB statistics (through 2026 season)
- Win–loss record: 0–0
- Earned run average: 4.82
- Strikeouts: 29
- Stats at Baseball Reference

Teams
- Tampa Bay Rays (2025); Seattle Mariners (2026–present)
Medals
Men's baseball
Representing United States
U-18 Baseball World Cup
Gold medal – first place	2017 Thunder Bay	Team

Mitchell Cole Wilcox (born July 14, 1999) is an American professional baseball pitcher for the Seattle Mariners of Major League Baseball (MLB). He made his MLB with the Tampa Bay Rays in 2025.

== Amateur career ==
Wilcox attended Heritage High School in Ringgold, Georgia, where he played baseball, basketball, and football. He committed to play college baseball at the University of Georgia as a freshman. In 2017, he pitched for the United States national under-18 team that won the U-18 Baseball World Cup. In 2018, his senior year, he went 9–2 with a 1.59 ERA, striking out 95 batters over 65 2/3 innings. He was drafted by the Washington Nationals in the 37th round of the 2018 Major League Baseball draft but did not sign and instead chose to attend Georgia.

In 2019, Wilcox's freshman year at Georgia, he appeared in 19 games (six starts) in which he went 3–2 with a 4.07 ERA, striking out 64 over 59 2/3 innings. He excelled during Southeastern Conference (SEC) play, with a 2.29 ERA and a .184 batting average against over 43 2/3 innings pitched during conference play. He was named to the All-SEC Freshman Team. That summer, he played for the U.S. national collegiate team and also played briefly for the Orleans Firebirds of the Cape Cod Baseball League. Wilcox had a 3–0 record and a 1.57 ERA over four starts in 2020 before the college baseball season was cut short due to the COVID-19 pandemic.

== Professional career ==
=== San Diego Padres ===
Wilcox was considered a top prospect for the 2020 Major League Baseball draft. He was selected by the San Diego Padres in the third round with the 80th overall selection. He signed with the Padres on June 30 for a $3.3 million signing bonus, a record among players drafted in the third round. He did not play a minor league game in 2020 due to the cancellation of the minor league season caused by the pandemic.

=== Tampa Bay Rays ===
On December 29, 2020, Wilcox, along with Luis Patiño, Blake Hunt, and Francisco Mejía, were traded to the Tampa Bay Rays in exchange for Blake Snell. To begin the 2021 season, Wilcox was assigned to the Charleston RiverDogs of the Low-A East. He was placed on the 10-day injured list with an elbow strain on July 19, then transferred to the 60-day injured list on August 9, effectively ending his season. Over ten starts prior to the injury, Wilcox was 1–0 with a 2.03 ERA, striking out 52 batters over 44 1/3 innings. He underwent Tommy John surgery in early September.

Wilcox was activated off the injured list in early August 2022 and made seven starts between the Rookie-level Florida Complex League Rays and Charleston. He went 0–2 with a 3.94 ERA and 24 strikeouts over 16 innings. In 2023 season, he pitched for the Montgomery Biscuits of the Double-A Southern League. Over 25 starts, Wilcox went 6–8 with a 5.23 ERA and 99 strikeouts over 106 2/3 innings. He split the 2024 season between Montgomery and the Triple-A Durham Bulls and pitched to a 10–7 record and 3.57 ERA over 28 starts between the two teams.

Wilcox opened the 2025 season with Montgomery in a relief role, and was promoted to Durham in late April. Over 39 appearances between the two affiliates, he went 2–5 with a 3.70 ERA with 63 strikeouts. On September 17, Wilcox was selected to the 40-man roster and promoted to the major leagues for the first time. He made his debut on September 19 against the Boston Red Sox, pitching one inning with one strikeout and giving up seven runs. Wilcox was optioned back to Durham the following day. Wilcox was designated for assignment by Tampa Bay on November 3.

=== Seattle Mariners ===
On November 5, 2025, Wilcox was traded to the Seattle Mariners in exchange for cash. Wilcox was optioned to the Triple-A Tacoma Rainiers to begin the 2026 season. He was recalled twice by the Mariners during the season, once on March 27 before he was optioned to Tacoma on May 4. Wilcox was recalled by the Mariners a second time on June 30. On August 7, he was placed on the injured list with an oblique strain, which ended his season. Wilcox made 23 relief appearances for Seattle and had a 4.00 ERA and 28 strikeouts over 27 innings.

== Personal life ==
Wilcox's mother played college basketball at Chattanooga State Community College.
