= Luis Patiño (baseball) =

Colombian baseball player (born 1999)

Free agent
- Pitcher
- Born: October 26, 1999 (age 26); Barranquilla, Colombia
- Bats: Right Throws: Right

MLB debut
- August 5, 2020, for the San Diego Padres

MLB statistics (through 2023 season)
- Win–loss record: 7–6
- Earned run average: 5.02
- Strikeouts: 124
- Stats at Baseball Reference

Teams
- San Diego Padres (2020); Tampa Bay Rays (2021–2023); Chicago White Sox (2023)

Luis Fernando Patiño Arzuza (born October 26, 1999) is a Colombian professional baseball pitcher who is a free agent. He has previously played in Major League Baseball (MLB) for the San Diego Padres, Tampa Bay Rays, and Chicago White Sox.

== Career ==
=== San Diego Padres ===
On July 2, 2016, Patiño signed with the San Diego Padres as an international free agent. He spent the 2017 season with the Dominican Summer League Padres and Arizona League Padres, going 4–2 with a 2.25 ERA in 13 games (12 starts) between the two clubs.

In 2018, Patiño played with the Fort Wayne TinCaps. where he pitched to a 6–3 record, a 2.16 ERA, and a 1.07 WHIP in 17 starts. He began the 2019 season with the Lake Elsinore Storm, and he was named to the 2019 All-Star Futures Game. He was promoted to the Amarillo Sod Poodles in August. Over twenty games (19 starts) between the two teams, Patiño went 6–8 with a 2.57 ERA, striking out 123 over 94 2/3 innings.

On August 4, 2020, Patiño was called up to the major leagues. At the time, he was the youngest player in MLB. He appeared in eleven games in 2020, finishing the season with a 5.14 ERA.

=== Tampa Bay Rays ===
On December 29, 2020, Patiño, along with Francisco Mejía, Blake Hunt and Cole Wilcox, was traded to the Tampa Bay Rays in exchange for Blake Snell. At the time of the trade he was ranked the 23rd best prospect in baseball by MLB.com and a top 10 prospect by Fangraphs. He made 19 appearances (15 starts) for the Rays in 2021, recording a 5–3 record and 4.31 ERA with 74 strikeouts and 77.1 innings pitched.

In a start against the Oakland Athletics on April 11, 2022, Patiño was removed with an oblique strain after 13 pitches. He was transferred to the 60-day injured list two days later on April 13. On July 15, he was activated off of the injured list. In 6 starts for the Rays, Patiño struggled to a 1–2 record and 8.10 ERA with 11 strikeouts in 20.0 innings pitched.

Patiño was optioned to the Triple-A Durham Bulls to begin the 2023 season.

=== Chicago White Sox ===
On August 1, 2023, Patiño was traded to the Chicago White Sox in exchange for cash considerations. In 7 games for the White Sox, he posted a 3.57 ERA with 13 strikeouts across 17 2/3 innings of work. On December 20, Patiño was designated for assignment following the addition of Josimar Cousín to the roster.

=== San Diego Padres (second stint) ===
On December 22, 2023, Patiño was claimed off waivers by the San Diego Padres. He began the 2024 season on the injured list with right elbow inflammation. On April 30, 2024, Patiño underwent Tommy John surgery, ruling him out for the entirety of the season. On November 22, the Padres non–tendered Patiño, making him a free agent.

On January 6, 2025, Patiño re-signed with the Padres organization on a minor league contract. He made nine starts split between the Single-A Lake Elsinore Storm and Double-A San Antonio Missions, registering an 0-1 record and 2.63 ERA with 27 strikeouts across 27 1/3 innings pitched. Patiño was released by the Padres organization on August 16.

=== Diablos Rojos del México ===
On January 20, 2026, Patiño signed with the Diablos Rojos del México of the Mexican League. In three starts for the team, he posted a 7.71 ERA with nine strikeouts across 11 2/3 innings pitched. On July 17, Patiño was released by the Diablos.

=== Sultanes de Monterrey ===
On July 17, 2026, Patiño signed with the Sultanes de Monterrey of the Mexican League. In three appearances (two starts) for the Sultanes, he struggled to an 0–1 record with a 14.66 ERA and seven strikeouts over 11 2/3 innings pitched. On August 4, Patiño was released by Monterrey.
