= Bradgley Rodríguez =

Venezuelan baseball player (born 2003)

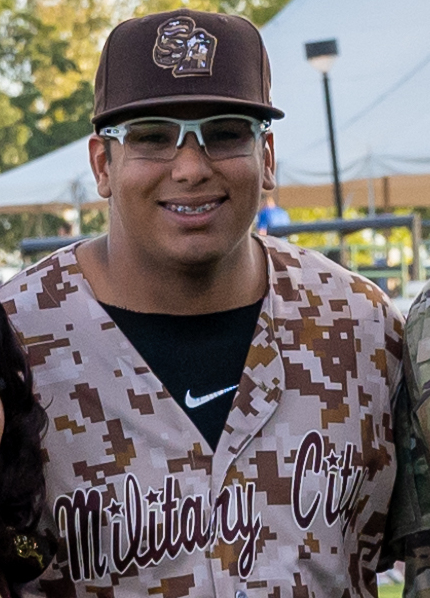
- Rodríguez with the San Antonio Missions in 2024

San Diego Padres – No. 72
- Pitcher
- Born: November 16, 2003 (age 22); Petare, Venezuela
- Bats: Right Throws: Right

MLB debut
- May 31, 2025, for the San Diego Padres

MLB statistics (through 2026 season)
- Win–loss record: 5–3
- Earned run average: 2.09
- Strikeouts: 90
- Stats at Baseball Reference

Teams
- San Diego Padres (2025–present)

Bradgley Eduardo Rodríguez (born November 16, 2003) is a Venezuelan professional baseball pitcher for the San Diego Padres of Major League Baseball (MLB). He made his MLB debut in 2025.

== Career ==
Rodríguez signed with the San Diego Padres as an international free agent on January 15, 2021. He made his professional debut that year with the Dominican Summer League Padres.

Rodríguez missed the 2022 and 2023 seasons after undergoing Tommy John surgery. He returned to action in 2024 with the Single-A Lake Elsinore Storm, High-A Fort Wayne TinCaps and Double-A San Antonio Missions, accumulating a 2-1 record and 2.64 ERA with 75 strikeouts and seven saves across 45 total appearances. Rodríguez returned to San Antonio to begin the 2025 season.

On May 30, 2025, Rodríguez was promoted to the major leagues for the first time. On September 22, Rodríguez recorded his first career win, tossing a scoreless inning against the Milwaukee Brewers.
