= Dustin Harris =

American baseball player (born 1999)

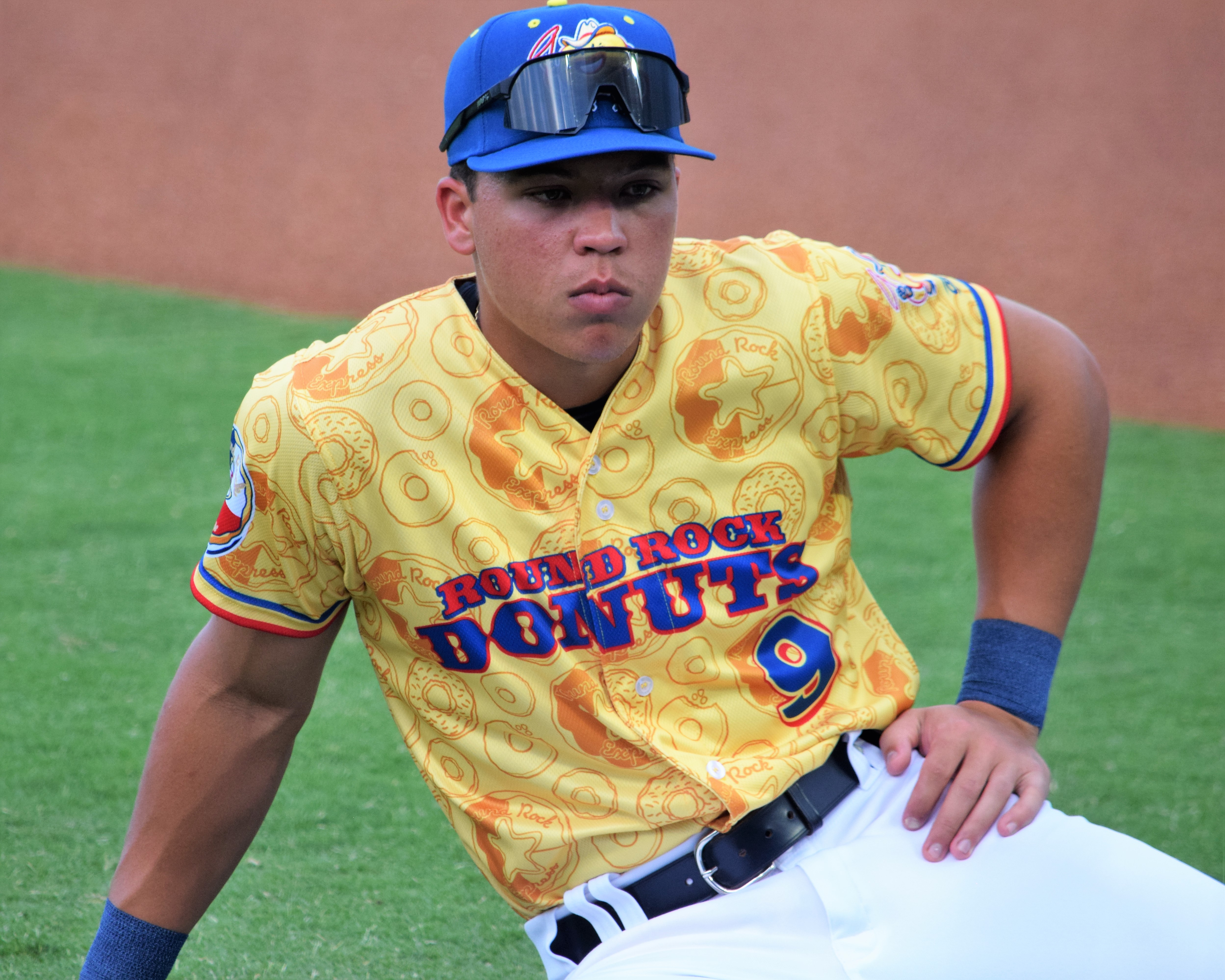
- Harris with the Round Rock Express in 2023

San Diego Padres – No. 29
- Outfielder
- Born: July 8, 1999 (age 27); Tampa, Florida, U.S.
- Bats: Left Throws: Right

MLB debut
- September 28, 2024, for the Texas Rangers

MLB statistics (through 2026 season)
- Batting average: .274
- Home runs: 2
- Runs batted in: 24
- Stats at Baseball Reference

Teams
- Texas Rangers (2024–2025); Chicago White Sox (2026); Houston Astros (2026); San Diego Padres (2026–present)

Dustin Alexander Harris (born July 8, 1999) is an American professional baseball outfielder for the San Diego Padres of Major League Baseball (MLB). He has previously played in MLB for the Texas Rangers, Chicago White Sox, and Houston Astros. He made his MLB debut in 2024.

== Amateur career ==
Harris attended Land O' Lakes High School in Land O' Lakes, Florida. He was named First Team All-State during his senior season in 2017. Undrafted out of high school in 2017, Harris attended St. Petersburg College in St. Petersburg, Florida, to play college baseball for the Titans. He hit .373 with 33 RBI in 2018. During the summer of 2018, he played for the Worcester Bravehearts of the Futures Collegiate Baseball League. He hit .306/.367/.434/.800 with 2 home runs and 42 RBI, and was named a league All-Star. Harris committed to transfer to Florida Atlantic University following his sophomore season. In his sophomore season of 2019, he hit .409 with 7 home runs, 42 RBI, and 13 stolen bases.

== Professional career ==
=== Oakland Athletics ===
Harris was drafted by the Oakland Athletics in the 11th round, with the 344th overall selection, of the 2019 Major League Baseball draft, and signed with them for a $250,000 signing bonus.

Harris split his first professional season between the rookie–level Arizona League Athletics and the Low–A Vermont Lake Monsters, combining to hit .325/.403/.407 with one home run and 26 RBI. He did not play in a game in 2020 due to the cancellation of the minor league season because of the COVID-19 pandemic.

=== Texas Rangers ===
On September 18, 2020, Harris and Marcus Smith were traded to the Texas Rangers as the players to be named later in the Mike Minor trade. Harris opened the 2021 season with the Down East Wood Ducks of the Low-A East, hitting .301/.389/.483 with 10 home runs, 53 RBI, and 20 stolen bases. He was promoted to the Hickory Crawdads of the High-A East on August 3. Harris hit .372/.425/.648 with 10 home runs, 32 RBI, and five stolen bases over 37 games for Hickory. Harris was named the Rangers 2021 Tom Grieve Player of the Year. Harris spent the 2022 season with the Frisco RoughRiders of the Double-A Texas League, hitting .257/.346/.471 with 17 home runs, 66 RBI, and 19 stolen bases over 85 games. He represented the Rangers at the 2022 All-Star Futures Game. Harris missed the final two months of the 2022 season due to a left wrist sprain.

On November 15, 2022, the Rangers selected Harris to their 40-man roster to protect him from the Rule 5 draft. Harris opened the 2023 season back with Frisco. He was promoted to the Round Rock Express of the Triple-A Pacific Coast League on June 20, after hitting .245/.374/.406 with five home runs, 29 RBI, and 24 stolen bases over 60 games. Over 67 games for Round Rock, he hit .273/.382/.455 with nine home runs, 31 RBI, and 17 stolen bases.

Harris was optioned to Triple–A Round Rock to begin the 2024 season. In 131 games for the Express, he batted .272/.358/.391 with 10 home runs, 53 RBI, and 35 stolen bases. On September 24, 2024, Harris was promoted to the major leagues for the first time. Harris made his MLB debut on September 28. He hit his first home run a day later off of Roansy Contreras of the Los Angeles Angels.

Harris was optioned to Triple-A Round Rock to begin the 2025 season. In 16 appearances for Texas, he batted .200/.263/.343 with one home run, one RBI, and one stolen base. On July 31, 2025, Harris was designated for assignment by the Rangers. He cleared waivers and was sent outright to Triple-A Round Rock on August 3. Texas selected his contract back to their active roster on September 5. He went 1-for-5 (.200) with one RBI over three games prior to the conclusion of the season. On November 5, Harris was removed from the 40-man roster and sent outright to Round Rock; he subsequently rejected the assignment and elected free agency.

=== Chicago White Sox ===
On December 22, 2025, Harris signed a minor league contract with the Chicago White Sox. He was assigned to the Triple-A Charlotte Knights to begin the regular season. On April 7, 2026, the White Sox selected Harris' contract, adding him to their active roster. In six appearances for the team, he went 3-for-12 (.250) with one RBI and two stolen bases. On April 15, Harris was designated for assignment by the White Sox following the promotion of Sam Antonacci.

=== Houston Astros ===
On April 18, 2026, Harris was claimed off of waivers by the Houston Astros. He made 11 appearances for Houston, batting .226/.286/.290 with four RBI and two stolen bases. On May 5, Harris was designated for assignment by the Astros. He elected free agency after clearing waivers on May 8.

=== Chicago White Sox (second stint) ===
On May 11, 2026, Harris signed a minor league contract to return to the Chicago White Sox organization. In 45 total appearances for the Triple–A Charlotte Knights, he batted .312/.396/.490 with six home runs, 26 RBI, and nine stolen bases. On July 2, Harris was released by Chicago after exercising the opt–out clause in his contract.

=== San Diego Padres ===
On July 8, 2026, Harris signed a minor league contract with the San Diego Padres. He was released on August 5, however two days later he re-signed with the Padres on a new minor league contract. In 29 appearances for the Triple–A El Paso Chihuahuas, Harris slashed .350/.422/.617 with six home runs, 26 RBI, and 10 stolen bases. On August 24, the Padres selected Harris' contract, adding him to their active roster.
