= Jase Bowen =

American baseball player (born 2000)

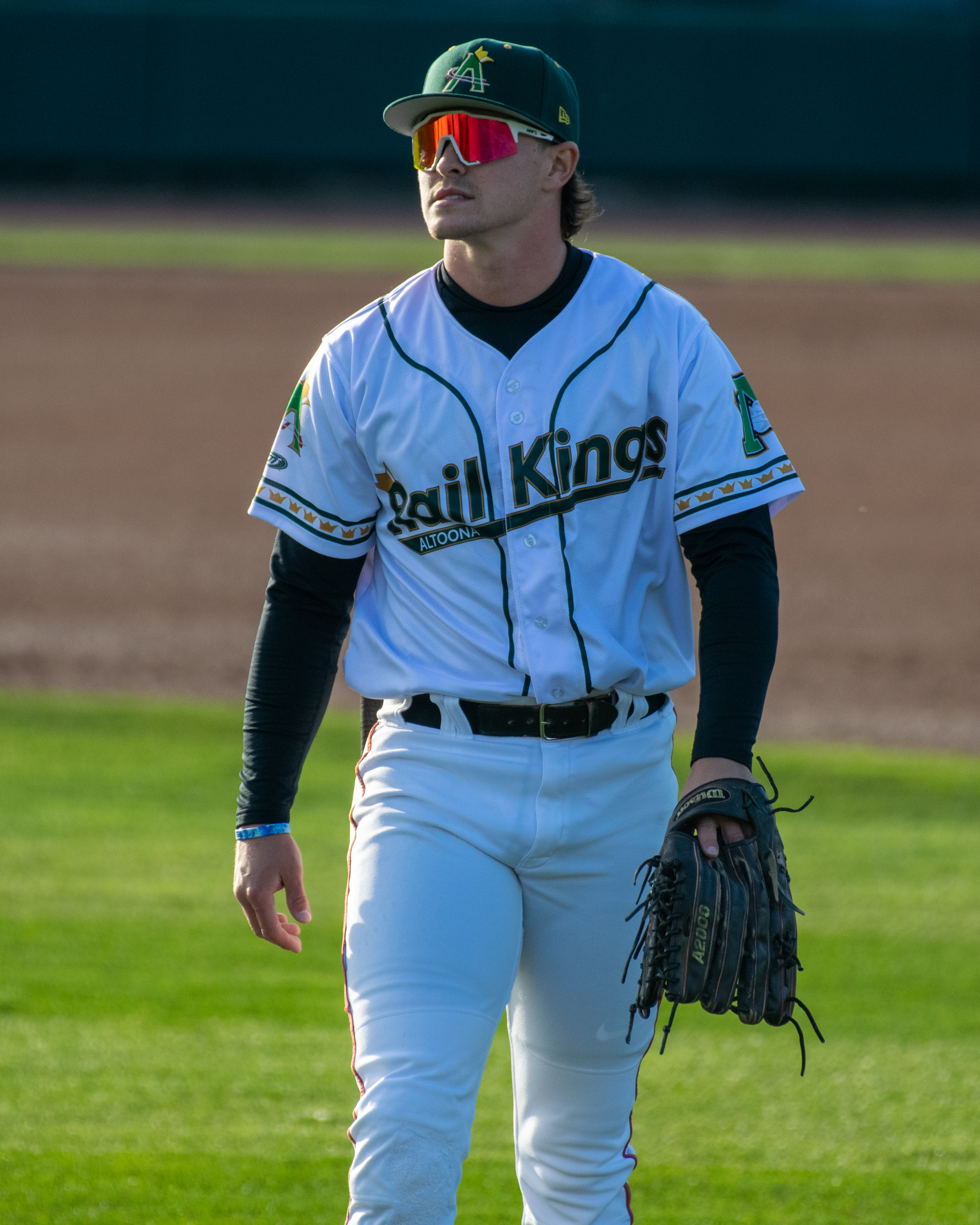
- Bowen with the Altoona Curve in 2025

San Diego Padres – No. 4
- Outfielder
- Born: September 2, 2000 (age 26); Northwood, Ohio, U.S.
- Bats: Right Throws: Right

MLB debut
- June 2, 2026, for the San Diego Padres

MLB statistics (through 2026 season)
- Batting average: .146
- Home runs: 2
- Runs batted in: 7
- Stats at Baseball Reference

Teams
- San Diego Padres (2026–present)

Jase Callaway Bowen (born September 2, 2000) is an American professional baseball outfielder for the San Diego Padres of Major League Baseball (MLB). He made his MLB debut in 2026.

== Career ==
Bowen attended Central Catholic High School in Toledo, Ohio.

=== Pittsburgh Pirates ===
Bowen was selected by the Pittsburgh Pirates in the 11th round of the 2019 Major League Baseball draft. He signed with the Pirates rather than play college baseball and college football at Michigan State University. He made his professional debut that year with the Gulf Coast League Pirates.

Bowen did not play in a game in 2020 due to the cancellation of the minor league season because of the COVID-19 pandemic. He returned to action in 2021 to play for the Bradenton Marauders and played 2022 with Bradenton and the Greensboro Grasshoppers. After the season, Bowen played in the Australian Baseball League for the Sydney Blue Sox.

Bowen started 2023 with Greensboro before being promoted to the Double-A Altoona Curve. He made 110 appearances for Altoona during the 2024 campaign, slashing .241/.298/.366 with 10 home runs, 43 RBI, and 22 stolen bases.

Bowen split the 2025 season between Bradenton, Greensboro, Altoona, and the Triple-A Indianapolis Indians, slashing a cumulative .272/.353/.449 with nine home runs, 37 RBI, and 20 stolen bases. He elected free agency following the season on November 6, 2025.

=== San Diego Padres ===
On November 26, 2025, Bowen signed a minor league contract with the San Diego Padres. He was assigned to the Triple-A El Paso Chihuahuas to begin the regular season, where he slashed .292/.362/.600 with 13 home runs, 36 RBI, and seven stolen bases across his first 49 games. On June 2, 2026, Bowen was promoted to the major leagues for the first time. In his debut that day, Bowen recorded his first career hit, singling off of Philadelphia Phillies reliever Orion Kerkering.
