= Samad Taylor =

American baseball player (born 1998)

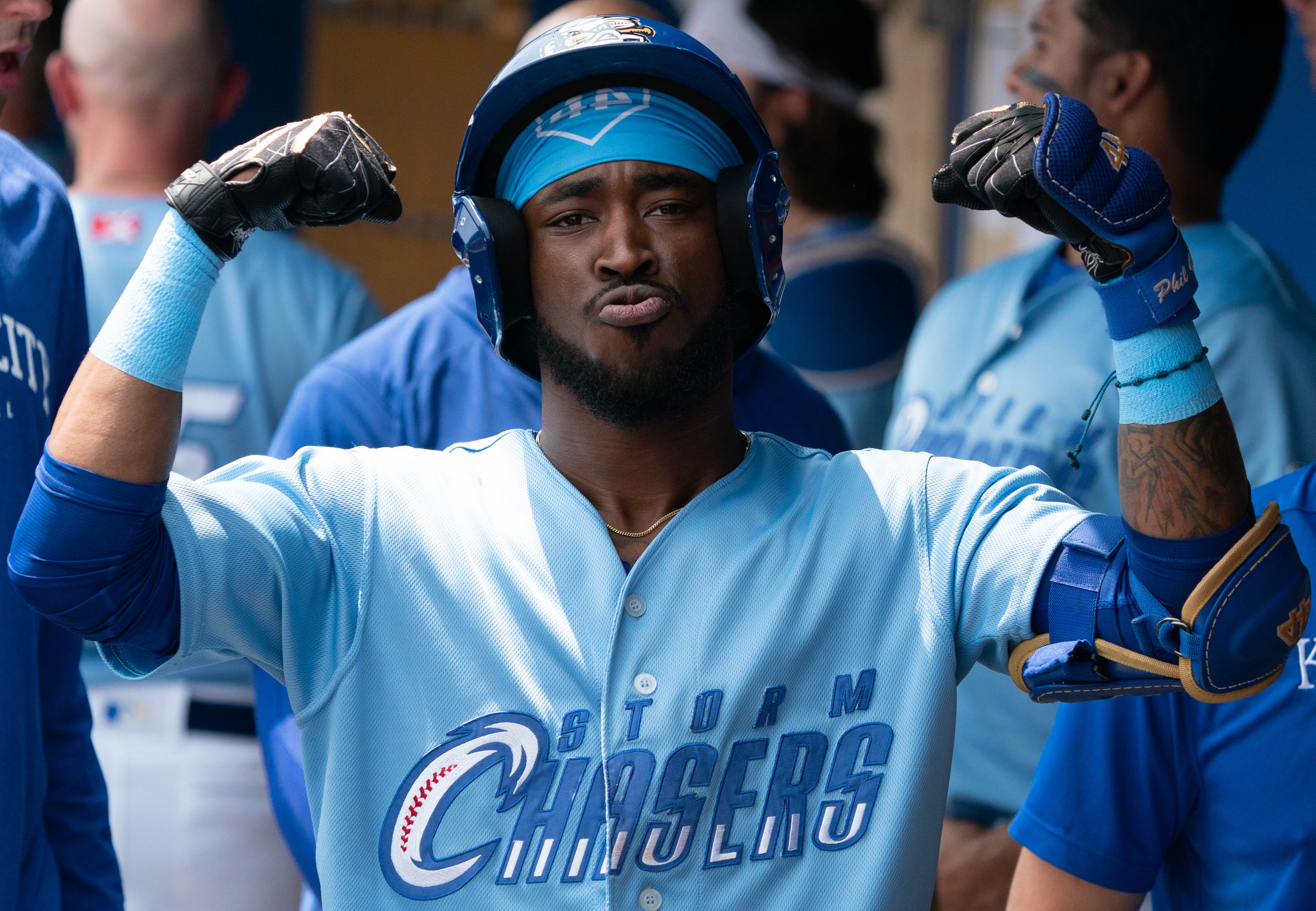
- Taylor with the Omaha Storm Chasers in 2023

San Diego Padres – No. 0
- Outfielder / Second baseman
- Born: July 11, 1998 (age 28); Corona, California, U.S.
- Bats: Right Throws: Right

MLB debut
- June 17, 2023, for the Kansas City Royals

MLB statistics (through 2026 season)
- Batting average: .280
- Home runs: 2
- Runs batted in: 22
- Stats at Baseball Reference

Teams
- Kansas City Royals (2023); Seattle Mariners (2024–2025); San Diego Padres (2026–present)

Samad Jahad Taylor (born July 11, 1998) is an American professional baseball outfielder and second baseman for the San Diego Padres of Major League Baseball (MLB). He has previously played in MLB for the Kansas City Royals and Seattle Mariners.

== Career ==
Taylor attended Corona High School in Corona, California. He committed to play college baseball for the Arizona Wildcats.

=== Cleveland Indians ===
Taylor was selected in the 10th round of the 2016 Major League Baseball draft by the Cleveland Indians and signed for $125,000. He was assigned to the Rookie-level Arizona League Indians, where he hit .293 with one home run and 14 runs batted in (RBIs) in 32 games. He started the 2017 season with the Low-A Mahoning Valley Scrappers.

=== Toronto Blue Jays ===
On July 31, 2017, the Indians traded Taylor and pitcher Thomas Pannone to the Toronto Blue Jays in exchange for reliever Joe Smith. He later said that it took several weeks to adjust to the trade. The Blue Jays assigned Taylor to the Rookie Advanced Bluefield Blue Jays for five games before promoting him to the Vancouver Canadians for the remainder of the season. In 52 total games in 2017, Taylor hit .294 with six home runs.

Taylor played for the Single-A Lansing Lugnuts in 2018. In 121 games, he batted .228 with nine home runs and 53 RBI. His 44 stolen bases were a significant increase from 7 the previous year, which he credited to studying the tendencies of pitchers and catchers. He was promoted to the High-A Dunedin Blue Jays in 2019, where he played in 108 games and hit .216 with seven home runs, 38 RBI, and 26 steals.

After the 2020 minor league season was cancelled due to the COVID-19 pandemic, Taylor played 25 games for the Canberra Cavalry in the Australian Baseball League from December 2020 to February 2021. He played the 2021 season for the Double-A New Hampshire Fisher Cats, batting .294 with 16 home runs, 52 RBI, and 30 stolen bases in 87 games and was named a MiLB.com Organization All-Star. Taylor played with the Tigres del Licey of the Dominican Winter League during the offseason. He started 2022 with the Triple-A Buffalo Bisons. He was placed on the injured list on July 4, then came back for one game on July 13 before going back on the injured list for the rest of the season. Before his injury, he hit .258 with 9 home runs and 23 stolen bases in 70 games in his first trip through Triple-A.

=== Kansas City Royals ===
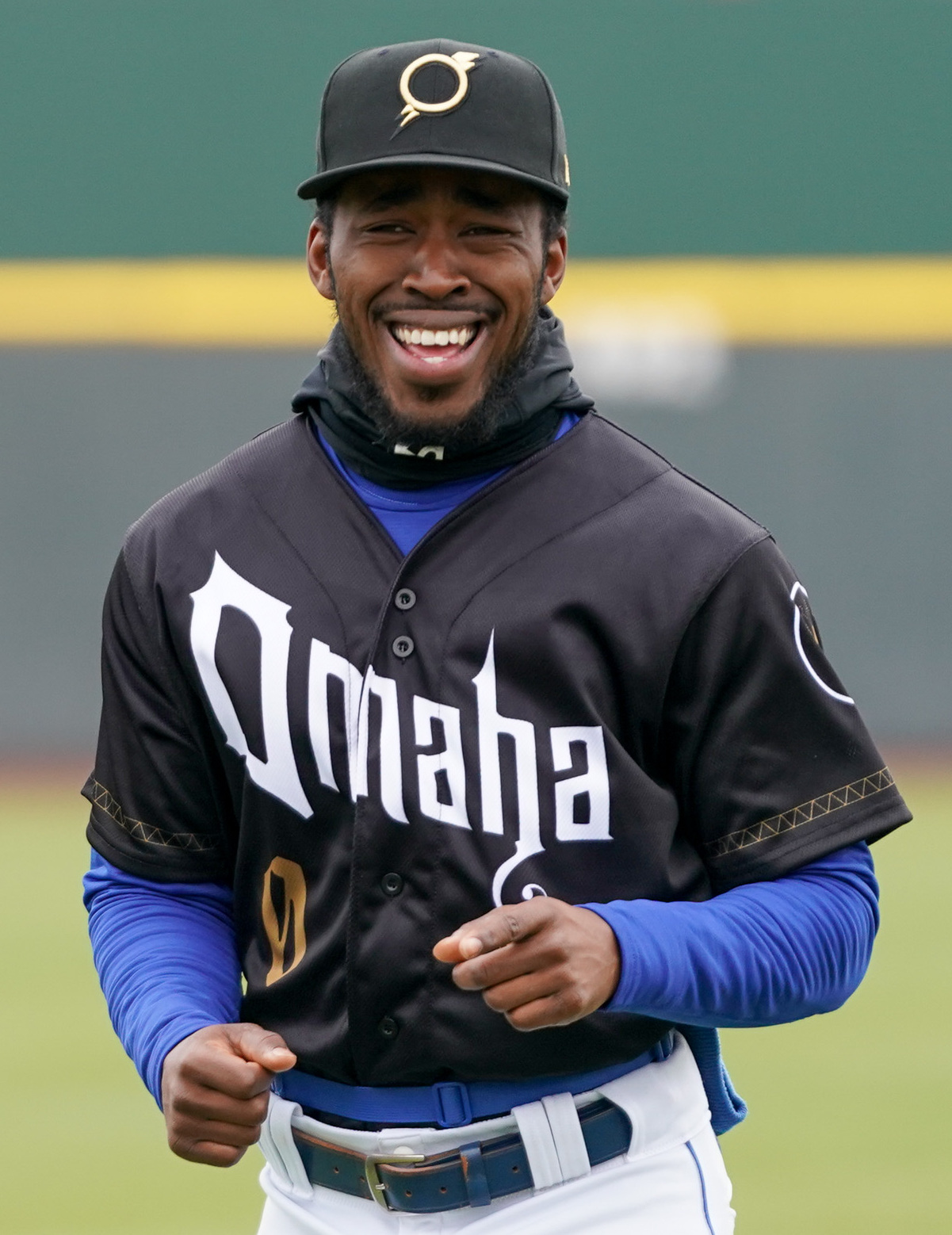
Taylor with the Storm Chasers in 2023

On August 2, 2022, Taylor and pitcher Max Castillo were traded to the Kansas City Royals for Whit Merrifield. Taylor first played after the trade for the Surprise Saguaros in the Arizona Fall League, where he hit .152 with 9 stolen bases in 76 plate appearances. On November 10, the Royals selected Taylor's contract to the 40-man roster to protect him from the Rule 5 draft.

Taylor began the 2023 season with the Triple-A Omaha Storm Chasers. In 62 games to start the season for Omaha, he hit .304/.409/.463 with 6 home runs, 37 RBI, and 34 stolen bases. On June 16, 2023, Taylor was promoted to the major leagues for the first time. The next day, Taylor made his major league debut, going 1-for-3 with his first major league hit coming on a walk-off RBI single on a deep fly ball that Los Angeles Angels' center fielder Mike Trout did not attempt to catch. Taylor split the rest of 2023 between the majors and Triple-A: he was optioned down to Omaha three different times, with his final demotion coming on September 4. Taylor played in 31 games for the Royals, 11 times as a substitute, and batted .200 with no home runs and 8 stolen bases. After his initial call-up, he played in 27 more games for the Storm Chasers from July through September, batting .295 with 2 home runs and 9 stolen bases.

=== Seattle Mariners ===
On January 30, 2024, Taylor was traded to the Seattle Mariners for a player to be named later or cash considerations. Seattle sent minor league pitcher Natanael Garabitos to the Royals on March 16 to complete the trade. Taylor began 2024 with the Triple-A Tacoma Rainiers. After 4 games with the Rainiers, Taylor was recalled to the Mariners on April 5. He played in three games, going 2-for-5 and scoring twice before he was optioned back to Tacoma on April 8. He played the rest of the season with Tacoma, hitting .262 with 11 home runs. His 50 stolen bases led the Pacific Coast League, topping teammate Ryan Bliss, who finished second with 40 steals. The Rainiers broke the league record for most steals in a season.

Taylor was designated for assignment by Seattle on January 15, 2025. He cleared waivers and was sent outright to Tacoma on January 21. In 24 games for Tacoma, Taylor batted .321 with five home runs, 14 RBI, and six stolen bases. On April 29, the Mariners selected Taylor's contract, adding him to their active roster as Dylan Moore went on the injured list. He batted 1-for-8 with one run in four games before the Mariners optioned him back to Tacoma on May 6 as Moore returned to the active roster.

On January 15, 2026, the Mariners designated Taylor for assignment following the acquisition of Yosver Zulueta. He cleared waivers and elected to become a free agent on January 23.

=== San Diego Padres ===
On January 24, 2026, Taylor signed a minor league contract with the San Diego Padres. He began the regular season with the Triple-A El Paso Chihuahuas, batting .319/.406/.500 with seven home runs, 25 RBI, and nine stolen bases. On June 3, the Padres selected Taylor's contract, adding him to their active roster. Taylor hit his first MLB home run against Trey Gibson of the Baltimore Orioles on June 13.

== Personal life ==
Taylor and his wife had their first child in 2024.

Growing up, Taylor was a fan of Chone Figgins and José Reyes. In 2022 with Buffalo, he credited Mallex Smith as a mentor.
