= David Morgan (baseball) =

American baseball player (born 1999)

San Diego Padres – No. 66
- Pitcher
- Born: October 26, 1999 (age 26); Mission Viejo, California, U.S.
- Bats: Right Throws: Right

MLB debut
- May 26, 2025, for the San Diego Padres

MLB statistics (through 2026 season)
- Win–loss record: 5–3
- Earned run average: 3.12
- Strikeouts: 89
- Stats at Baseball Reference

Teams
- San Diego Padres (2025–present)

David Scott Morgan (born October 26, 1999) is an American professional baseball pitcher for the San Diego Padres of Major League Baseball (MLB). He made his MLB debut in 2025.

== Career ==
Morgan attended Mission Viejo High School and played college baseball at Orange Coast College and Hope International University. After going undrafted in the 2022 Major League Baseball draft, he signed with the San Diego Padres as a free agent. He made his professional debut with the Arizona Complex League Padres, posting a 3.00 ERA with four strikeouts over three games. Morgan split the 2023 campaign between the Low-A Lake Elsinore Storm and the High-A Fort Wayne TinCaps. In 28 games for the two affiliates, he compiled a 4-3 record and 3.83 ERA with 46 strikeouts. He split the 2024 season between Fort Wayne and the Double-A San Antonio Missions, totaling a 5.04 ERA with 63 strikeouts in 40 games.

To begin the 2025 season, Morgan was assigned to Double-A San Antonio, posting a 3.12 ERA with 19 strikeouts in seven appearances. On April 27, 2025, Morgan was selected to the 40-man roster and promoted to the major leagues for the first time. On May 4, he was optioned to the Triple–A El Paso Chihuahuas without making an appearance, becoming a phantom ballplayer. On May 25, Morgan was recalled to San Diego, and the next day, he made his major league debut against the Miami Marlins. On July 6, he made his first career start against the Texas Rangers, pitching 1 1/3 innings and allowing one earned run in a no-decision. On July 12, Morgan recorded his first career win, tossing a scoreless inning of relief against the Philadelphia Phillies.
