= Ethan Salas =

American baseball player (born 2006)

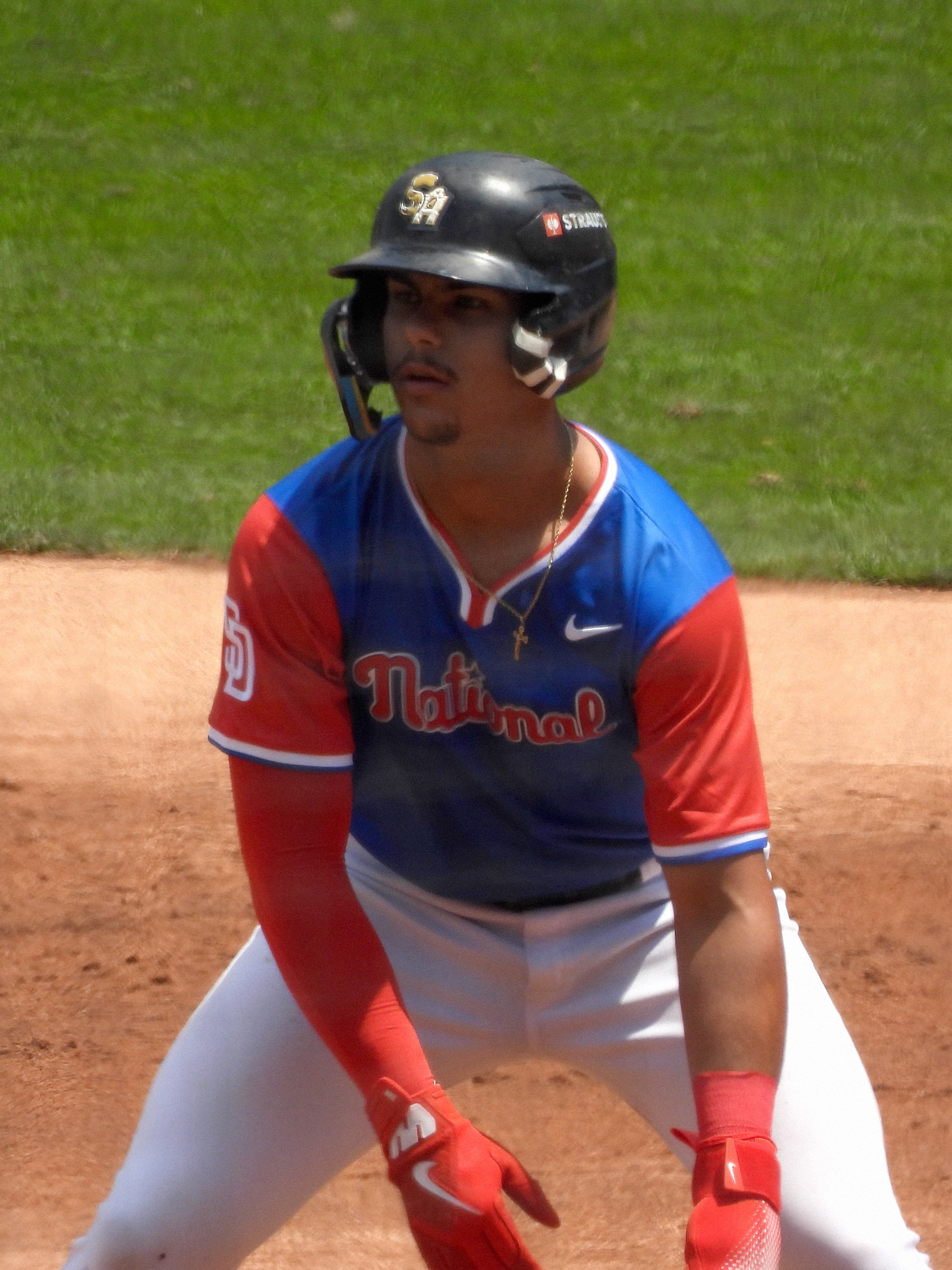
- Salas playing in the All-Star Futures Game in 2026

San Diego Padres – No. 8
- Catcher
- Born: June 1, 2006 (age 20); Kissimmee, Florida, U.S.
- Bats: Left Throws: Right

MLB debut
- September 2, 2026, for the San Diego Padres

MLB statistics (through 2026 season)
- Batting average: .256
- Home runs: 2
- Runs batted in: 5
- Stats at Baseball Reference

Teams
- San Diego Padres (2026–present)

Ethan Gabriel Salas (born June 1, 2006) is an American professional baseball catcher for the San Diego Padres of Major League Baseball (MLB). He made his MLB debut in 2026.

== Early life ==
Ethan Gabriel Salas was born on June 1, 2006, in Kissimmee, Florida. His father, Jose Antonio Salas, played in Minor League Baseball (MiLB) for the Atlanta Braves organization, and his uncle and grandfather also played in MiLB. Salas spent time growing up in Florida, the Dominican Republic, and Venezuela.

== Professional career ==
Salas played one game for the Águilas del Zulia of the Venezuelan Winter League in the 2022-23 season.

Considered the top international free agent in the 2023 class and "one of the top catching prospects in recent history," Salas signed with the San Diego Padres in January for a record $5.6 million bonus.

Salas was promoted to the Double–A San Antonio Missions at age 17, a nearly unprecedented rise through the team's farm system. A. J. Preller, the Padres' president of baseball operations, acknowledged that the promotion was "aggressive" but said that Salas was "up to the challenge."

On September 1, 2026, the Padres promoted Salas to the major leagues for the first time. He went hitless in his first 15 at bats before tripling on September 13 against the San Francisco Giants for his first major league hit. Against the Colorado Rockies on September 16, Salas hit two home runs and became the youngest MLB catcher with multiple home runs in a game. On September 19, he hit a walk-off single in the 10th inning of a 7–6 win over the Miami Marlins. Over the last 10 games of the season, he slashed .400/.423/.720. On September 30, Salas started in Game 2 of the National League (NL) Wild Card Series against the Chicago Cubs, and became the youngest catcher, at 20 years and 120 days old, to play in the MLB postseason. He surpassed Bob Didier (20 years, 230 days) of the Atlanta Braves in the 1969 NL Championship Series.

== Personal life ==
Salas is fluent in English and Spanish. His brother José plays in the Minnesota Twins organization and his brother Andrew plays for the Miami Marlins organization.
