= Rodolfo Durán =

Dominican baseball player (born 1998)

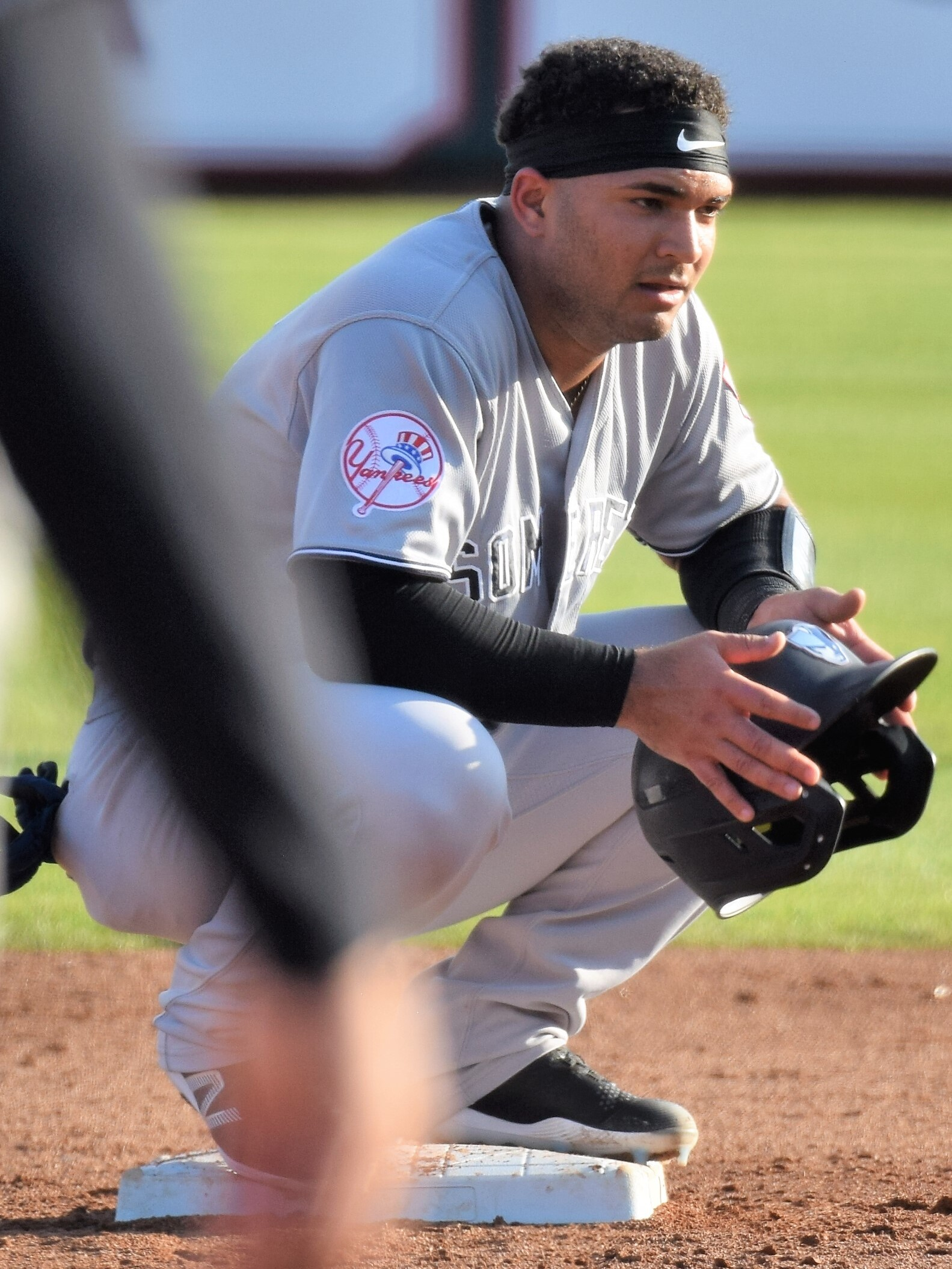
- Durán with the Somerset Patriots in 2022

San Diego Padres – No. 48
- Catcher
- Born: February 19, 1998 (age 28); Santo Domingo, Dominican Republic
- Bats: Right Throws: Right

MLB debut
- May 7, 2026, for the San Diego Padres

MLB statistics (through 2026 season)
- Batting average: .146
- Home runs: 3
- Runs batted in: 8
- Stats at Baseball Reference

Teams
- San Diego Padres (2026–present)

Rodolfo José Durán (born February 19, 1998) is a Dominican professional baseball catcher for the San Diego Padres of Major League Baseball (MLB). He made his MLB debut in 2026.

== Career ==
Durán played in Minor League Baseball for the Philadelphia Phillies, Royals, and New York Yankees organizations before signing on with the Padres. He also played for the Estrellas Orientales of the Dominican Winter League.

On December 15, 2023, Durán signed a minor league contract with the Kansas City Royals. He made 84 appearances split between the Double-A Northwest Arkansas Naturals and Triple-A Omaha Storm Chasers, batting a cumulative .282/.323/.467 with 11 home runs and 60 RBI. Durán elected free agency following the season on November 4, 2024.

On January 6, 2025, Durán signed a minor league contract with the San Diego Padres. He made 86 appearances for the Triple-A El Paso Chihuahuas during the regular season, batting .288/.344/.503 with 16 home runs and 73 RBI.

The Padres promoted Durán to the major leagues on May 7, 2026 to replace Luis Campusano, who was placed on the injured list, to make his debut that night. He recorded his first major league hit, a home run off of the Seattle Mariners' Logan Gilbert, on May 16.
