= Luis Campusano =

American baseball player (born 1998)

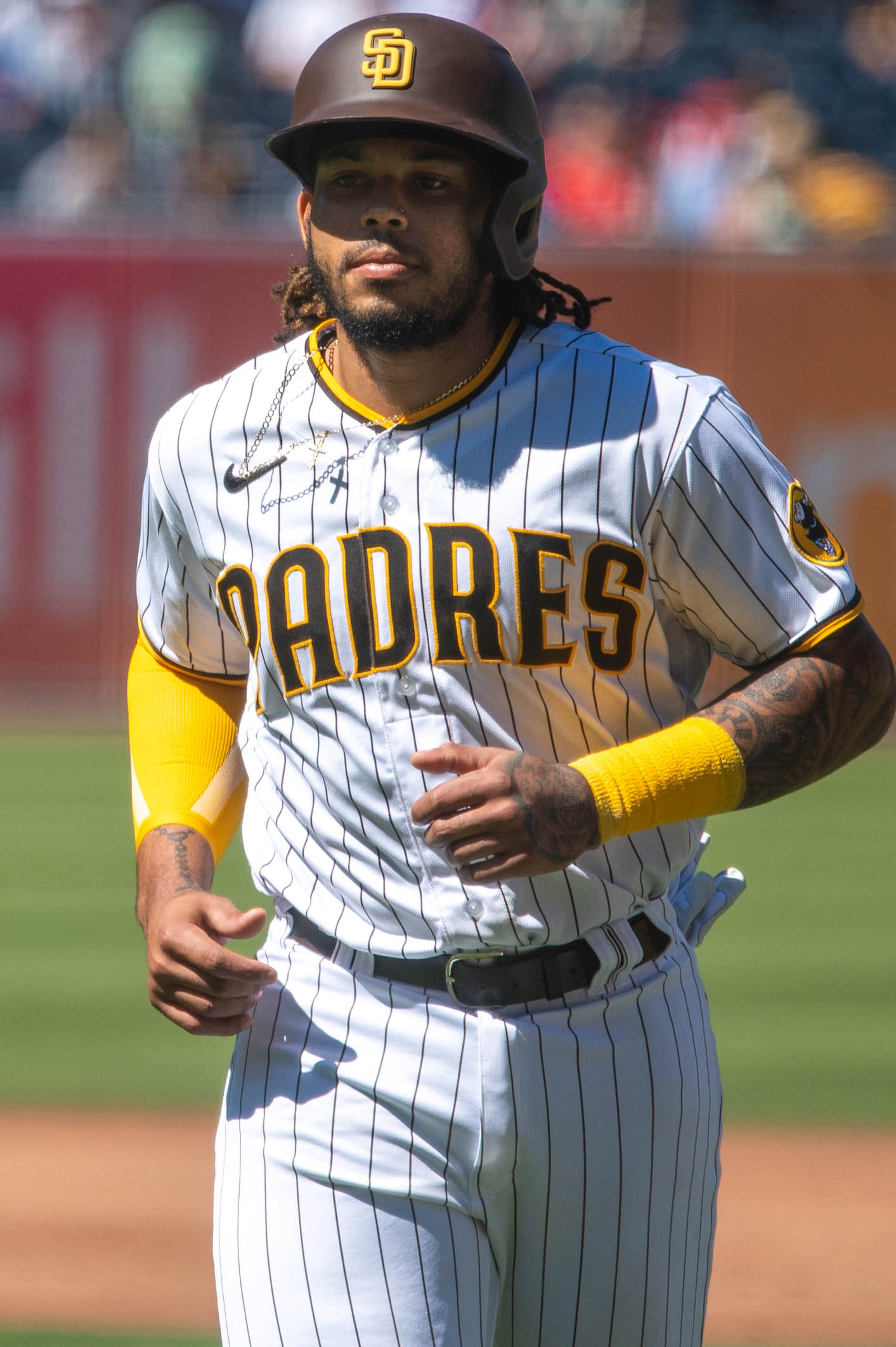
- Campusano with the San Diego Padres in 2022

San Diego Padres – No. 12
- Catcher
- Born: September 29, 1998 (age 28); Augusta, Georgia, U.S.
- Bats: Right Throws: Right

MLB debut
- September 4, 2020, for the San Diego Padres

MLB statistics (through 2026 season)
- Batting average: .247
- Home runs: 25
- Runs batted in: 107
- Stats at Baseball Reference

Teams
- San Diego Padres (2020–present)

Luis Genaro Campusano (born September 29, 1998) is a Dominican-American professional baseball catcher for the San Diego Padres of Major League Baseball (MLB). He made his MLB debut in 2020.

== Amateur career ==
Campusano graduated from Cross Creek High School in Augusta, Georgia. He was primarily a first baseman, and did not begin catching until his junior year. As a junior, he batted .493 with six home runs and 33 RBIs. As a senior, he batted .622 with six home runs. He had committed to play college baseball for the Missouri Tigers, but he decommitted and then committed to play for the South Carolina Gamecocks during his senior year. He was selected by the San Diego Padres in the second round (39th overall) of the 2017 Major League Baseball draft and he signed for $1.3 million, forgoing his commitment to South Carolina.

== Professional career ==
After signing, Campusano made his professional debut with the rookie-level Arizona League Padres. He spent the whole season there, batting .269 with four home runs and 25 RBI in 37 games. He spent 2018 with the Fort Wayne TinCaps where he slashed .288/.345/.365 with three home runs and forty RBI in seventy games and was named a Midwest League All-Star. Campusano spent 2019 with the Lake Elsinore Storm, earning California League All-Star honors. Over 110 games, he batted .325/.396/.509 with 15 home runs and 81 RBI. He was named California League-co MVP (alongside Luis Castro). Following the season, Campusano played for the Peoria Javelinas of the Arizona Fall League.

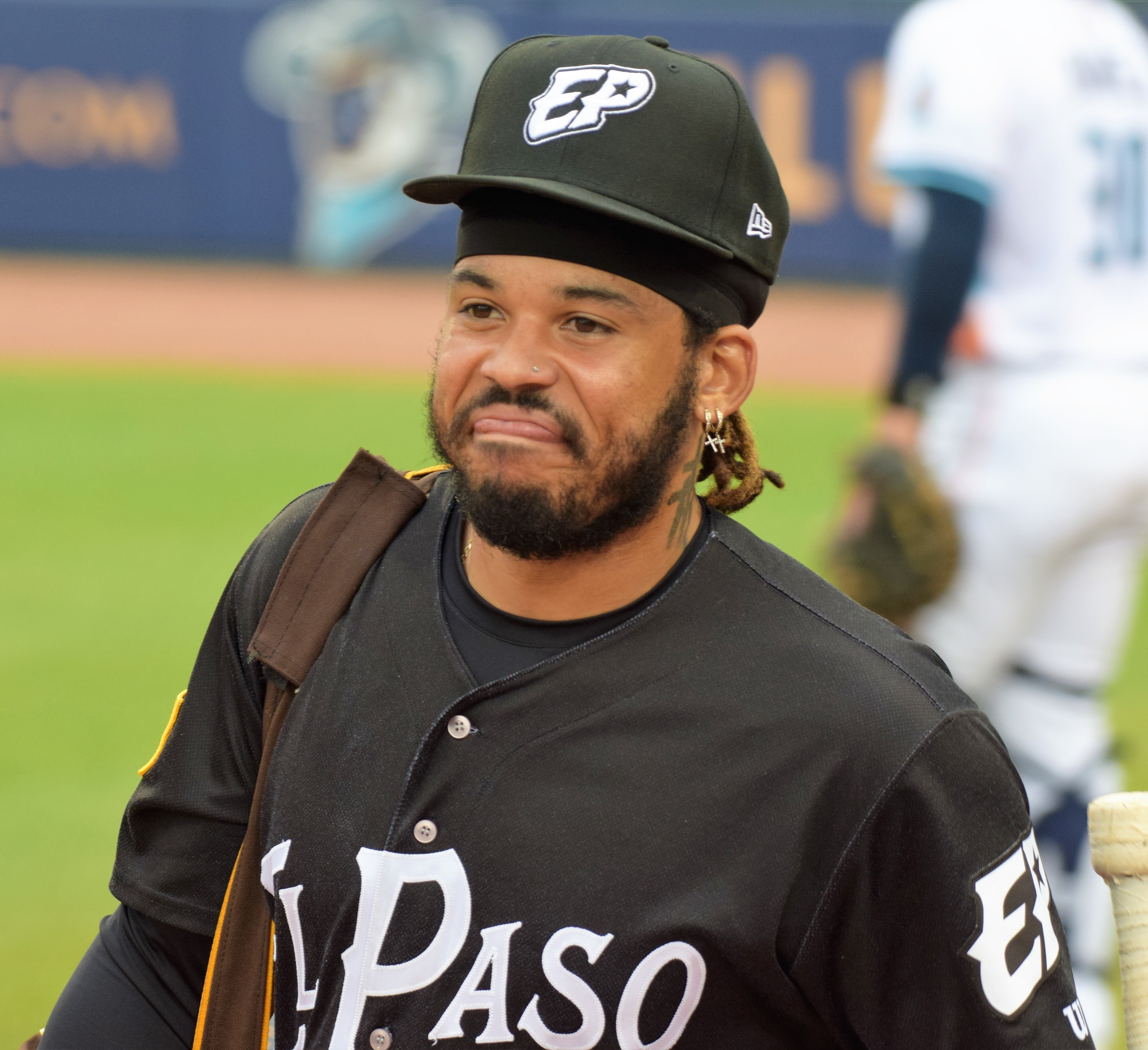
Campusano with the El Paso Chihuahuas in 2022

Campusano was promoted to the major leagues on September 4, 2020, and made his major league debut that night against the Oakland Athletics, going one-for-three with a solo home run off reliever T. J. McFarland. He was placed on the injured list two days later with a wrist sprain; the injury ended his season. To begin the 2021 season, Campusano was assigned to the major league roster before being optioned to the El Paso Chihuahuas of the Triple-A West in late April. In June, he was selected to play in the All-Star Futures Game at Coors Field. Over 81 games with El Paso, he slashed .295/.365/.541 with 15 home runs and 45 RBI. He appeared in 11 games for the Padres, recording three hits over 34 at-bats.

In 2023, Campusano played in only 7 games for San Diego before being placed on the injured list. On May 12, 2023, it was announced that he would miss at least two months after undergoing ligament surgery on his left thumb. He was activated from the injured list on July 18. Campusano made 49 total appearances for San Diego, batting .319/.356/.491 with seven home runs and 30 RBI.

Campusano made 91 appearances for the Padres during the 2024 campaign, hitting .227/.281/.361 with eight home runs and 40 RBI. Campusano was optioned to Triple-A El Paso to begin the 2025 season. He made the opening day roster for the 2026 season.

== Personal life ==
Campusano's father, Genaro, signed with the Pittsburgh Pirates as an international free agent in 1989 and spent four years playing in their minor league system.

On October 17, 2020, Campusano was arrested in Grovetown, Georgia, and charged with a felony after he was pulled over by police and found to be in possession of 79 grams (2.8 oz) of marijuana. He was released on a $5,000 bond. The charges against him were dropped in April 2021, after questions were raised about the legality of the initial stop by police.
