= Tommy Pham =

American baseball player (born 1988)

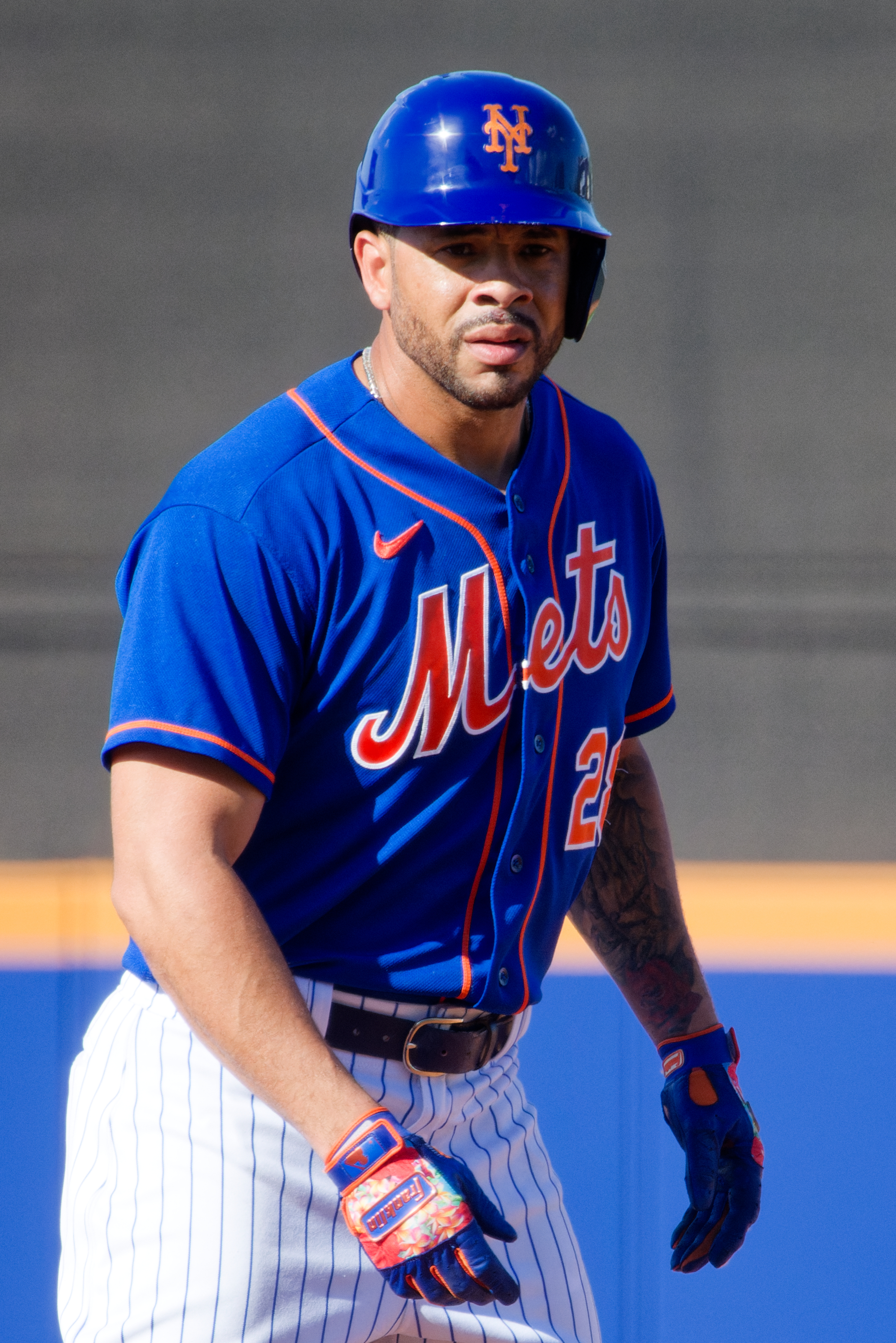
- Pham with the New York Mets in 2023

Free agent
- Outfielder
- Born: March 8, 1988 (age 38); Las Vegas, Nevada, U.S.
- Bats: Right Throws: Right

MLB debut
- September 9, 2014, for the St. Louis Cardinals

MLB statistics (through 2026 season)
- Batting average: .255
- Home runs: 150
- Runs batted in: 525
- Stolen bases: 131
- Stats at Baseball Reference

Teams
- St. Louis Cardinals (2014–2018); Tampa Bay Rays (2018–2019); San Diego Padres (2020–2021); Cincinnati Reds (2022); Boston Red Sox (2022); New York Mets (2023); Arizona Diamondbacks (2023); Chicago White Sox (2024); St. Louis Cardinals (2024); Kansas City Royals (2024); Pittsburgh Pirates (2025); New York Mets (2026); Chicago White Sox (2026)

Thomas James Pham (born March 8, 1988) is an American professional baseball outfielder who is a free agent. He has played in Major League Baseball (MLB) for the St. Louis Cardinals, Tampa Bay Rays, San Diego Padres, Cincinnati Reds, Boston Red Sox, New York Mets, Arizona Diamondbacks, Chicago White Sox, Kansas City Royals, and Pittsburgh Pirates.

Pham was selected by the Cardinals in the 16th round of the 2006 MLB draft. After a number of injuries and a vision impairment in 2008 related to keratoconus (which he overcame the following year with contact lenses that give him 20/15 vision in both eyes) he made his MLB debut nine seasons after being drafted. In 2017, Pham became the first Cardinals batter since 1900 to record at least a .300 batting average, 20 home runs, 20 doubles, and 20 stolen bases in the same season.

== Early life and amateur career ==
Pham was born in Las Vegas, Nevada, to Tawana (age 17) and Anhtuan (age 19). His twin sister Brittany was born two minutes later. At the time, his father was incarcerated. His father was born in Vietnam to a Vietnamese mother and an African American father, and moved to the United States with his mother, brother, and sister. Pham's father was gifted in American football, but became entangled in drugs and street crime for decades.

Pham's mother's parents helped her raise her twins on the condition that she work. She had not finished high school, and took on jobs as a busser, a casino waitress, and at a bakery, and raised the twins in Spring Valley, Nevada. At the age of two, Pham's pediatrician feared that he had contracted rickets, so he wore leg braces for a year and a half. Because his mother worked so much, Pham said he could "count on one hand" the number of his games she attended.

When he was five years old, his mother married an electrician named Fred Polk, and they had a daughter, Mercedes. Pham "has had issues" with his stepfather. He says that when he was 25 years old, the two got into a fight, and his stepfather stabbed him.

Pham attended Gorman High School, Centennial High School, and then Durango High School in Las Vegas, where he played baseball as a pitcher and infielder. As a senior, Pham was named the Class 4A All-State Player of the Year by the Reno Gazette-Journal and a second team All-American, after batting .581. With a fastball in the 90–92 mph (145–148 km/h) range, he drew interest as a pitching prospect, but he did not like to pitch, and rarely did so his senior year.

Pham originally committed to play college baseball at Arizona. He then switched his commitment to Cal State Fullerton. Ultimately, he did not attend either school. After the St. Louis Cardinals selected him in the 16th round of the 2006 amateur draft, Pham instead opted for professional baseball over college. He received a $325,000 signing bonus, higher than most players drafted as late as the 16th round.

== Professional career ==
=== St. Louis Cardinals ===
==== Minor leagues ====
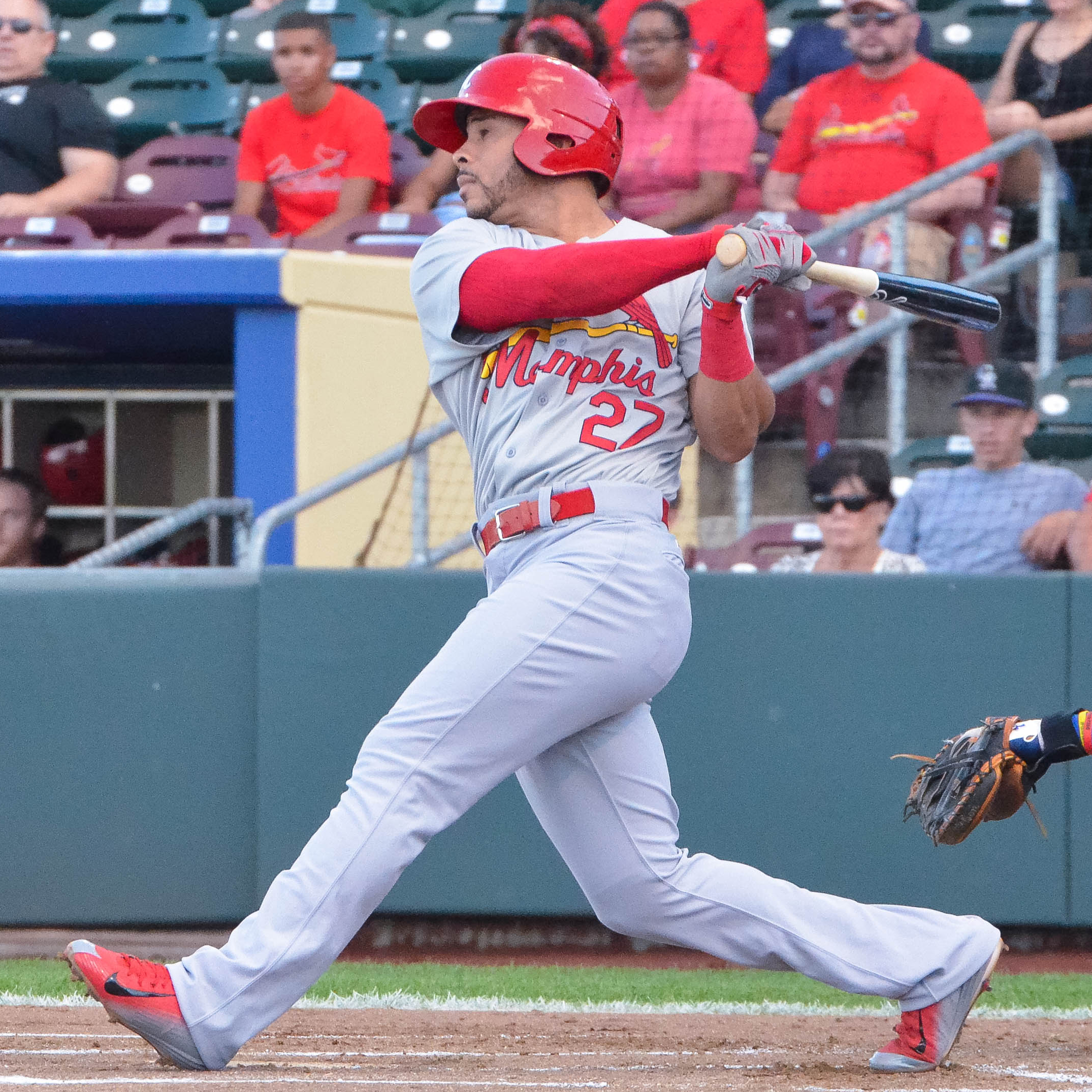
Pham playing for the Memphis Redbirds in 2015.

Pham began his minor league career in 2006 batting .231/.340/.324 with one home run in 216 plate appearances, with the Rookie League Johnson City Cardinals. He played shortstop, and made 22 errors in 37 games, for an .849 fielding percentage.

In 2007 he was shifted to the outfield. He batted .188/.272/.277 with two home runs in 303 plate appearances for the Low–A Batavia Muckdogs and Single–A Swing of the Quad Cities.

In 2008 he hit .203/.272/.396 with a career-high 156 strikeouts in 438 plate appearances for Single–A Quad Cities and the High–A Palm Beach Cardinals. In 2009 he batted .232/.313/.378 in 380 plate appearances in High–A. In 2010 he suffered a small fracture in his wrist. In a June 2011 game, he tore a wrist ligament. He played 40 games and batted .294.

In early 2012, he suffered a torn left shoulder labrum, costing him most of the season. For the 2012 season, he batted .154/.233/.282 in 43 plate appearances for the Double–A Springfield Cardinals. After promotion to Triple–A Memphis Redbirds of the Pacific Coast League (PCL) in 2013, he tore his other labrum. He returned to Springfield after rehabilitation. He batted .264 for Memphis in 30 games, and .301 for Springfield in 45 games. Pham played most of the 2014 season for Memphis, appearing in 104 games, and batted .324/.395/.491, with 63 runs scored, 16 doubles, six triples, 10 home runs and 44 runs batted in (RBI). In 2014-15 he played for Leones del Caracas in the Venezuelan Winter League, batting .143/.317/.265 in 63 plate appearances.

==== Major leagues ====
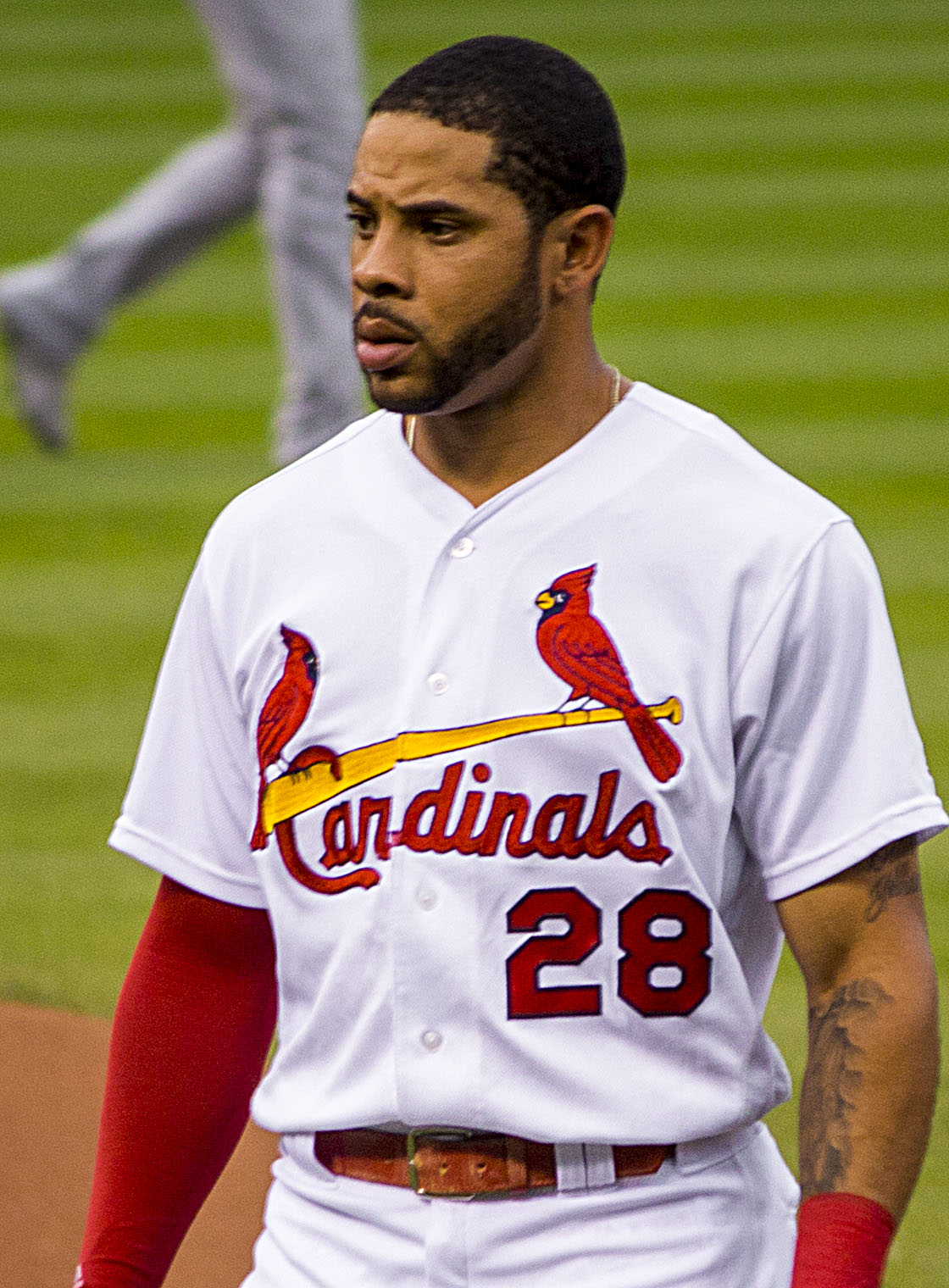
Pham with the Cardinals in 2017

Pham was called up to the major leagues with the Cardinals for the first time on September 7, 2014. In 2014, he struck out in his only two plate appearances.

==== 2015 ====
Pham opened the next season with Memphis, but missed the first two months with a strained left quadriceps. On June 9, Pham hit two home runs and a career-high five RBI against the Iowa Cubs. In his first 24 games after returning from the disabled list, he batted .338. Pham later was named the best defensive outfielder of the PCL for 2015 by Baseball America.

The Cardinals recalled Pham to the major league club on July 3, 2015, and in a 2–1 victory over the San Diego Padres the next day, he doubled for his first major league hit, then later in the game pilfered his first stolen base and scored the winning run, his first major league run. On July 5, Pham hit his first major league home run, hit another double, and drove in all three of the Cardinals' runs – his first three major league RBI – as the Cardinals again defeated the Padres, 3–1. On September 16, Pham tripled and had his first multi-home run game, against the Milwaukee Brewers in a 5–4 victory. He had homered in three consecutive plate appearances spanning his last at bat previous to the game, September 13 against the Cincinnati Reds.

The Cardinals won the National League Central division. Pham made his major league postseason debut as a pinch hitter during the bottom of the eighth inning of Game 1 of the 2015 National League Division Series (NLDS) against the Cubs, and hit his first career home run against Jon Lester.

==== 2016 ====
The Cardinals selected Pham for the Opening Day roster in 2016. He injured his left oblique during batting practice on Opening Day. He was the first player following the start of the regular season to be placed on the DL. The club reactivated him from the DL on May 17, and optioned him back to Memphis.

In 2016, he batted .226/.324/.440 for the Cardinals in 183 plate appearances over 78 games. For the season, he had the highest strikeout percentage against left-handed pitchers (41.7%), and the highest strikeout percentage in the major leagues (38.8%) of all batters with 180 or more plate appearances.

==== 2017 ====
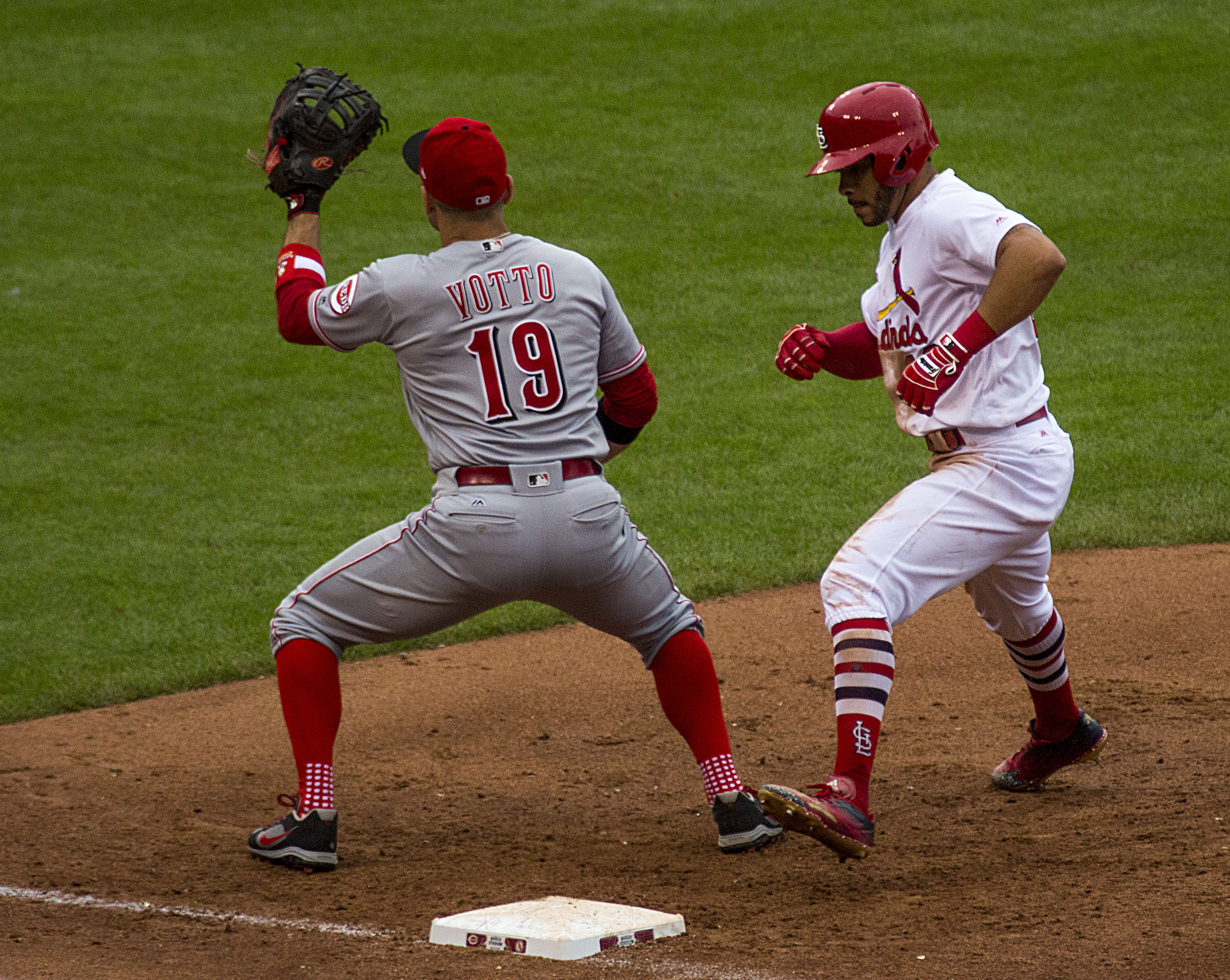
Pham safe on the pickoff throw as Cincinnati Reds first baseman Joey Votto covers

Pham did not make the 2017 Opening Day roster out of spring training, and began the season at Memphis. After batting .283/.371/.500 at Memphis with four home runs and 19 RBIs in 25 games, he was recalled to the Cardinals on May 5.

Pham eventually became the Cardinals starting right fielder. He finished the season batting .306/.411/.520 with 23 home runs, 73 RBIs, 22 doubles, and 25 stolen bases in 128 games. He became the first Cardinals batter since 1900 to record at least a .300 average, 20 home runs, 20 doubles, and 20 stolen bases in the same season. He also was 3rd in the league in power-speed number (24.0). On the bases, he led the major leagues by being picked off six times, the most by a Cardinal in 29 years. Pham placed tenth in the majors in Fangraphs' Wins Above Replacement (WAR). He ranked 11th in the National League Most Valuable Player Award (NL MVP) voting, the only Cardinals player to receive votes.

Pham's at-times dominant performance led to the portmanteau "Pham-tastic," from others as well as himself. Pham said that he kept himself disciplined with intense workout regimens and used technology such as Statcast data to sharpen and increase his playing skills.

==== 2018 ====
The Cardinals named Pham their starting center fielder prior to the 2018 season.

On April 25, while Pham practiced between his at bats in a batting cage, a resistance band contraption that Pham had designed himself failed, and his bat snapped off the band and cracked Pham in his forehead. It resulted in blunt trauma to Pham's head, and a significant contusion. Manager Mike Matheny removed him from the game. He was not placed on the disabled list, and returned to action a few games later. In 2018, he batted .248/.331/.399 for the Cardinals, in 396 plate appearances over 98 games.

=== Tampa Bay Rays ===
On July 31, 2018, the Cardinals traded Pham to the Tampa Bay Rays along with $500,000 of international bonus pool money for minor leaguers Justin Williams, Génesis Cabrera, and Roel Ramírez. At the time of the trade, Pham was batting .248 with 14 home runs and 41 RBIs. Following the trade, he said, "I'm just disappointed… I wanted to give more."

In his second game as a Ray, Pham fractured his right foot while being hit by a pitch, and went on the 10-day disabled list. The Rays activated Pham on August 16, and he recorded his first two hits as a Ray that night in a game against the New York Yankees. On August 25, Pham hit his first home run in a Rays uniform, a solo shot off Brandon Workman of the Boston Red Sox. Pham was named to the MLB team of the month for September after he hit .368/.407/.705 with five home runs and 17 runs batted in. In 39 games for the Rays, he hit .343/.448/.622 with seven home runs and 22 RBIs, while primarily playing left field.

On April 5, 2019, Pham reached base for the 40th straight game, the longest in Rays history. On April 6, Pham hit his first ever grand slam. In 2019 he batted .273/.369/.450, and led the major leagues in infield hits (25). On defense, he had the best fielding percentage of all major left fielders (1.000). A self-described student of the game, he said "I’m probably one of the one percent of the game that understands the sabermetrics."

=== San Diego Padres ===
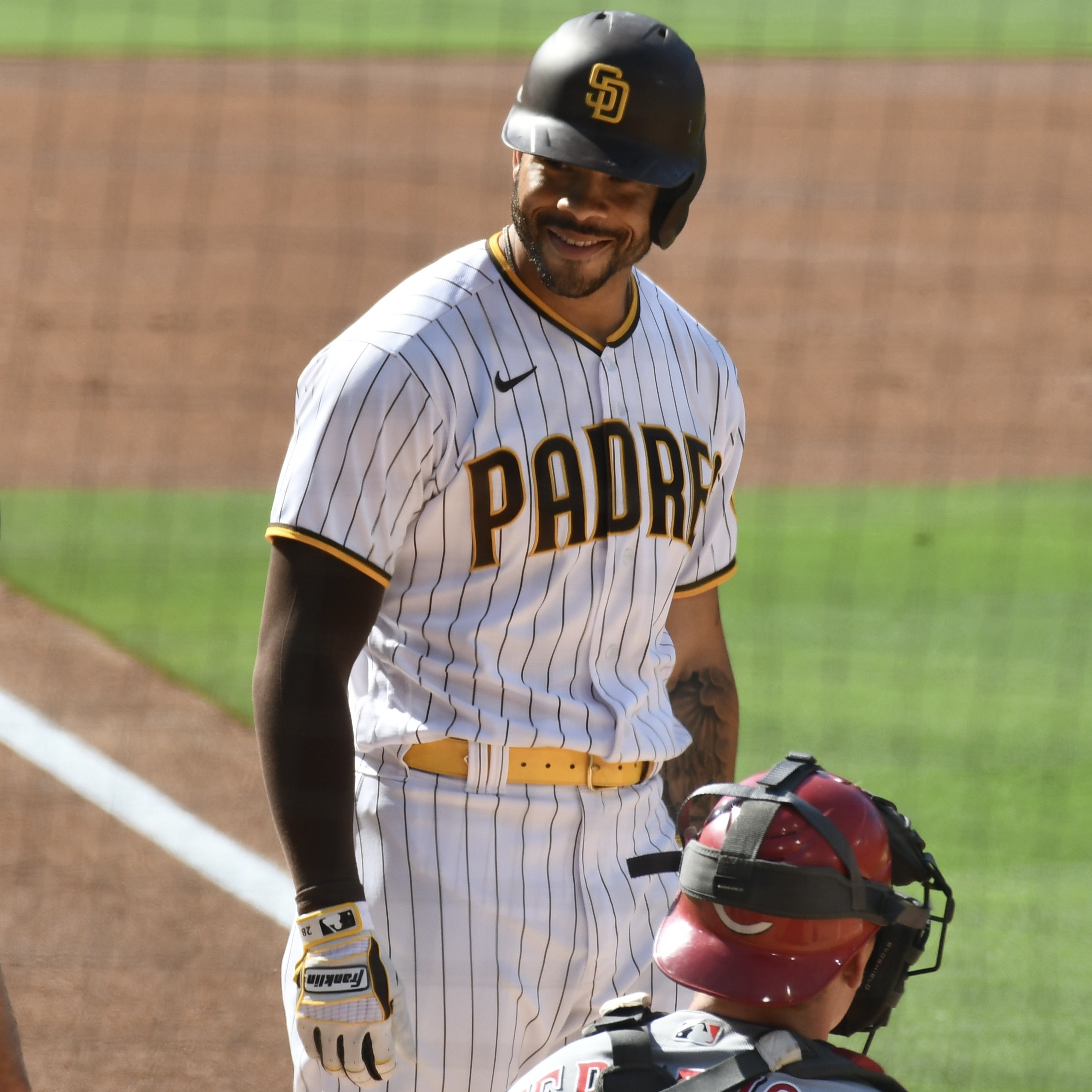
Pham with the Padres in 2021

On December 6, 2019, Pham and Jake Cronenworth were traded to the San Diego Padres in exchange for Hunter Renfroe, Xavier Edwards, and a player to be named later (PTBNL). The PTBNL, Esteban Quiroz, was named in March 2020.

In the pandemic-shortened 2020 season, Pham slashed .211/.312/.312 with 3 home runs and 12 RBIs in 125 plate appearances over 31 games. He hit ground balls 63.2% of the time, the third-highest percentage in the NL. On August 16, he suffered a fractured hamate bone in his left hand and underwent surgery, missing a month of action.

In October 2020, Pham was in an altercation outside a strip club in San Diego, and was stabbed in his lower back. He underwent surgery, in which he received 200 stitches; the team said that he had a non-life-threatening slash wound, but he later said he suffered “catastrophic injuries." When fans later heckled him with profanity with regard to the incident, Pham said: "When someone comes up to me cursing at me like that, I could defend myself and, you know, I'm a very good fighter. I don't do Muay Thai, kung fu and box for no reason.”

Later in the 2020 offseason, he underwent his third surgery since August. The surgery was to address a tear in the cartilage on the small finger side of his left wrist.

In 2021, Pham batted .229 (the 7th-lowest batting average in the NL)/.340/.383(3rd-lowest) with 15 home runs, 49 RBIs, and 14 stolen bases in 561 plate appearances over 155 games. He led the major leagues with 30 pinch hitting appearances. On November 3, the Padres granted him free agency.

=== Cincinnati Reds ===
On March 26, 2022, Pham signed a one-year contract, with a mutual option for 2023, with the Cincinnati Reds. Speaking about his goals, he said: “I’m playing to get my numbers. There's nothing selfish about that... I don’t care about anything else. I got to look out for me.”

On April 19, after his former teammate Luke Voit collided with Pham's teammate Tyler Stephenson at home plate while unsuccessfully trying to score, Pham criticized Voit's slide. He offered to fight Voit, and said: "If Luke wants to settle it, I get down really well. Anything, Muay Thai, whatever. I've got a (gym) owner here who will let me use his facility. So, fuck 'em."

On May 28, Pham was suspended three games and fined $5,000 for slapping Joc Pederson of the San Francisco Giants in the face prior to a game. Pham said his slap was prompted by a Pederson group text of a meme seven months prior, in a fantasy football league in which they both participated, and Pham's misunderstanding of the fantasy league's injured reserve rules. Pham said he had no regrets about his slap. Pham explained: "It’s a matter of principle, man."

In 91 games with Cincinnati, Pham batted .238 with 11 home runs and 39 RBIs.

=== Boston Red Sox ===
On August 1, 2022, Pham was traded to the Boston Red Sox for a player to be named later or cash considerations. In 53 games with Boston, Pham batted .234/.298/.374 with 6 home runs and 24 RBIs, completing the season batting .236 with a .312 on base percentage and .374 slugging percentage, with 17 home runs, 63 RBIs, and a career-high 167 strikeouts in 144 games. On November 10, 2022, the Red Sox announced that both the team and Pham declined a mutual option, making him a free agent.

=== New York Mets ===
On January 24, 2023, Pham signed a one-year, $6 million contract with the New York Mets. By the summer, he was the team's starting left fielder; Will Sammon wrote in The Athletic that his signing "proved to be a coup" and that his performance in New York stood in stark contrast to his struggles of the previous year. He was described as "one of the market’s most intriguing right-handed batters" in advance of the trade deadline. In 79 games for the Mets, Pham batted .268/.348/.472 with 10 home runs and 36 RBI.

Following his trade from the Mets that season, Pham claimed to have told clubhouse leader Francisco Lindor, "Out of all the teams I played on, this is the least-hardest working group of position players I've ever played with." He later said that he respected the work ethics of Lindor, Pete Alonso and Brandon Nimmo.

=== Arizona Diamondbacks ===
On August 1, 2023, the Mets traded Pham and cash considerations to the Arizona Diamondbacks in exchange for 17-year-old prospect Jeremy Rodriguez. Pham batted .241/.304/.415/.720, playing DH (24 games), left field (20 games), and right field (10 games) the rest of the regular season, and slashed .279/.297/.475/.772 while playing right field and DHing during the Diamondbacks' postseason run. The team made the World Series. Pham became a free agent following the season.

=== Chicago White Sox ===
On April 15, 2024, Pham signed a minor league contract with the Chicago White Sox. In four games for the Triple–A Charlotte Knights, he went 5–for–17 (.294) with one RBI. On April 26, Pham was added to Chicago's roster after he triggered an opt–out in his contract. In 70 games for Chicago, he batted .266/.330/.380 with five home runs and 19 RBI.

In the White Sox' 6–3 loss to the Milwaukee Brewers on June 2, Pham was involved in a play at home plate in which he was tagged out by Brewers catcher William Contreras to end the bottom of the eighth inning. After the game, Pham's comments during his media interviews attracted attention; he described the play at the plate with Contreras as "not even fucking close" and expressed frustration with third base coach Eddie Rodríguez, who waved Pham home: "The situation of the game, you know, third base coach [Eddie Rodriguez] sends you, you gotta go. I’m nailed out at home ... by a mile. I’m going to the dugout, and I hear the tough guy with all the hoo-rah shit." He further added "I'm never starting anything, but I'll be prepared to finish it. There's a reason I do all kinds of fighting in the offseason. Because I'm prepared to fuck somebody up."

=== St. Louis Cardinals (second stint) ===
On July 29, 2024, the White Sox traded Pham to the St. Louis Cardinals as part of a three-team deal that also sent Erick Fedde and a player to be named later to St. Louis, sent Tommy Edman, Michael Kopech and Oliver Gonzalez to the Los Angeles Dodgers, and sent Miguel Vargas, Alexander Albertus, Jeral Pérez and a player to be named later to the White Sox. In a pinch hitting role on July 30, Pham hit a grand slam in his first at–bat of his Cardinals return.

In 23 games for St. Louis, he slashed .206/.286/.368 with two home runs and 12 RBI. Pham was designated for assignment by the Cardinals on August 30.

=== Kansas City Royals ===
On August 31, 2024, the Kansas City Royals claimed Pham off of waivers. In 23 games for Kansas City, he batted .228/.250/.337 with 2 home runs and 8 RBI in 101 at bats.

In December 2024, he signed with the Leones del Escogido for the 2024–25 LIDOM season.

=== Pittsburgh Pirates ===
On February 16, 2025, Pham signed a one-year, $4 million contract with the Pittsburgh Pirates. It was his eighth team in three years. On April 23, in a game against the Los Angeles Angels, as Pham and a fan both reached for a ball in foul territory near the left field wall the fan's glove brushed against Pham's back. Pham turned and glared at the fan, before he threw the ball in to the infield. Pham then turned toward the fan, and made an obscene hand-jerking motion towards him. The Los Angeles Times reported: "Pham then motioned for the heckler to come onto the field, where presumably he would address the spat once and for all, man to man." He was suspended for one game, and fined $10,000, for inappropriate actions towards fans. On April 26, Pham doubled for his 1,000th career hit in a game against the Los Angeles Dodgers. Pham made 120 appearances for the Pirates, batting .245/.330/.370 with 10 home runs, 52 RBI, and five stolen bases.

=== New York Mets (second stint) ===
On March 26, 2026, Pham signed a minor league contract with the New York Mets; he was subsequently assigned to the Triple–A Syracuse Mets. On April 13, the Mets selected Pham's contract, adding him to their active roster. In nine appearances for New York, he went 0-for-13 with seven strikeouts and one walk. On April 27, Pham was designated for assignment by the Mets following the signing of Austin Slater. He elected free agency after clearing waivers on April 29.

=== Baltimore Orioles ===
On May 16, 2026, Pham signed a minor league contract with the Baltimore Orioles organization. In 16 appearances for the Triple-A Norfolk Tides, he batted .197/.286/.410 with four home runs and 11 RBI; he also played in one game for the rookie-level Florida Complex League Orioles. On June 11, Pham exercised the opt-out clause in his contract, and he was granted his release by the team the following day.

=== Philadelphia Phillies ===
On June 27, 2026, Pham signed a minor league contract with the Philadelphia Phillies. Pham made 44 appearances for the Triple–A Lehigh Valley IronPigs, slashing .250/.381/.391 with three home runs and 25 RBI; he also played in two games for the rookie–level Florida Complex League Phillies.

=== Chicago White Sox (second stint) ===
On August 31, 2026, Pham was traded to the Chicago White Sox in exchange for cash considerations. The next day, the White Sox selected Pham's contract after rosters expanded. In his first start for Chicago, Pham hit a home run off Cleveland Guardians starter Parker Messick.

== Personal life ==
Pham is of both African American and Vietnamese heritage. He is the first person of Vietnamese descent to play in MLB since pitcher Danny Graves in 2006.

Pham suffers from keratoconus, a rare eye disorder which causes degenerative vision. Pham started experiencing vision problems in 2008 and began wearing contact lenses in 2009, which gave him 20/15 vision in both eyes.

Pham was stabbed during a fight in San Diego as he left a local strip club on October 11, 2020. He had surgery at UC San Diego Health.
