= Michael Kopech =

American baseball player (born 1996)

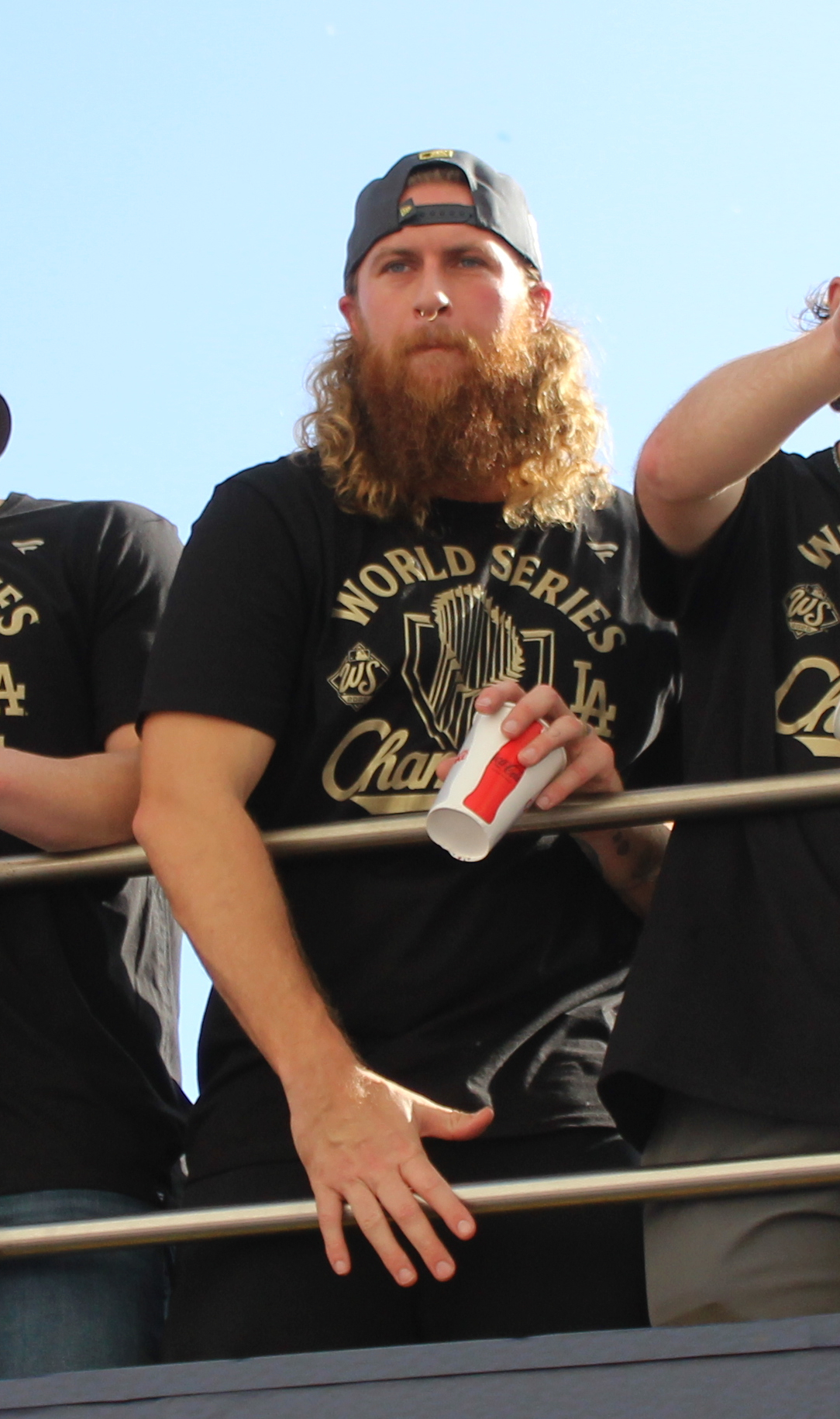
- Kopech in 2025 at the Dodgers parade

Free agent
- Pitcher
- Born: April 30, 1996 (age 30); Mount Pleasant, Texas, U.S.
- Bats: Right Throws: Right

MLB debut
- August 21, 2018, for the Chicago White Sox

MLB statistics (through 2025 season)
- Win–loss record: 21–33
- Earned run average: 4.14
- Strikeouts: 457
- Stats at Baseball Reference

Teams
- Chicago White Sox (2018, 2021–2024); Los Angeles Dodgers (2024–2025)

Career highlights and awards
- World Series champion (2024); Pitched an immaculate inning on July 10, 2024

Michael Talbert Kopech (born April 30, 1996) is an American professional baseball pitcher who is a free agent. He has previously played in Major League Baseball (MLB) for the Chicago White Sox and Los Angeles Dodgers. He was selected by the Boston Red Sox in the first round of the 2014 MLB draft and made his MLB debut in 2018 with the White Sox. Kopech was traded to the Dodgers at the 2024 trade deadline and won the World Series with the team that year.

== Amateur career ==
Kopech attended Mount Pleasant High School in Mount Pleasant, Texas. While in high school, he developed a baseball rivalry and eventual friendship with Patrick Mahomes. He committed to attend the University of Arizona. Kopech posted a 3–0 win–loss record and a 0.44 earned run average (ERA) in 11 games for Mount Pleasant, striking out 129 batters and giving up just 18 walks in 64 innings pitched, while earning 2014 Perfect Game First-Team All-American honors.

== Professional career ==
=== Boston Red Sox ===
The Boston Red Sox selected Kopech in the first round, with the 33rd overall selection, of the 2014 Major League Baseball draft. Kopech received a $1.6 million signing bonus from Boston. Kopech started his professional career with the rookie-level Gulf Coast League Red Sox in their 2014 season. He posted a 0–1 record and a 4.61 ERA in eight starts, which included 16 strikeouts and nine walks in 13 1/3 innings pitched.

In 2015, Kopech pitched for the Greenville Drive of the Single–A South Atlantic League (SAL), where he was 4–5 with a 2.63 ERA in 15 games. He struck out 70 batters and walked 27, in 65 innings, while earning a selection to the SAL All-Star Game. On July 16, he was suspended without pay for 50 games after testing positive for Oxilofrine, which is a banned substance under the Minor League Drug Prevention and Treatment Program. In the 2016 spring training, he broke his right hand during a fight with a teammate. He returned to action in the season-opener for the Lowell Spinners of the Low–A New York-Penn League, and was promoted to the Salem Red Sox of the High–A Carolina League. In his first five starts at Salem, Kopech yielded only three earned runs in 29 innings with at least seven strikeouts in every game. In total, Kopech made 11 starts, going 4–1 with a 2.25 ERA across 52 innings. During that stretch, he struck out 82 hitters, the most for a pitcher in MiLB for August. He posted a 2.08 ERA and gave only 29 walks, striking out double-digit batters in four of his last six starts, including a career-high 11 twice. After his solid pitching effort, Kopech was named the Carolina League Player of the Month for August. The award came along with his selection as the league's Pitcher of the Week for August 22–28. He carried a 0.93 ERA into his final start of the season before a tough outing against the Winston-Salem Dash on August 31. Overall, he collected 86 strikeouts in 56 1/3 innings during the two stints (13.7 SO/9, 38% of batters faced), along with a 4–1 record and a 2.08 ERA.

According to Baseball America, Kopech threw one of the fastest pitches in professional baseball history against the Wilmington Blue Rocks on July 13, 2016. Kopech sat at 98 miles per hour (158 km/h) in the game, and touched 100 miles per hour (160 km/h) and beyond on a regular basis, until a 105-mile-per-hour (169 km/h) pitch was double checked by different radar guns in the Salem ballpark. After the season, he played for the Surprise Saguaros in the Arizona Fall League, making six starts and allowing five runs in 22 1/3 innings for a 2.01 ERA.

=== Chicago White Sox ===
On December 6, 2016, the Red Sox traded Kopech, Yoán Moncada, Luis Alexander Basabe, and Victor Diaz to the Chicago White Sox for Chris Sale. In an offseason workout on January 17, 2017, throwing from flat ground with run-up, Kopech threw a pitch that was unofficially clocked at 110 miles per hour (180 km/h) with a 3-ounce (85 g) ball.

In 2017, Kopech was named the starter for the North Division in the Southern League All-Star Game after he went 4–3 with a 2.93 ERA over 58 1/3 innings and a league best 80 strikeouts in his first 11 starts for the Double-A Birmingham Barons. He was later named to the U.S. team of the 2017 All-Star Futures Game, striking out White Sox teammate Yoán Moncada of the World team. On August 18, 2017, the White Sox promoted Kopech to the Triple-A Charlotte Knights after he posted a 2.87 ERA over 119 1/3 innings in 22 starts with 155 strikeouts. Over his final five starts in Birmingham, Kopech allowed two earned runs and accumulated 49 strikeouts.

Kopech began the 2018 season with Charlotte, where he made 24 starts with a 7–7 record and 4.13 ERA. The White Sox promoted him to the major leagues on August 21, and he made his debut that day against the Minnesota Twins. His first MLB strikeout was of Miguel Sanó but his outing lasted only two innings because of rain. He struck out four batters and did not allow any runs. At the time of his debut, he was considered the 13th best prospect in all of MLB. He made a total of four starts, with a 1–1 record and 5.02 ERA before undergoing Tommy John surgery on September 18, putting him out for the rest of the 2018 season plus all of 2019 as well. On July 10, 2020, he announced that he would sit out the 2020 season as well, due to the COVID-19 pandemic.

Kopech was moved to the bullpen by the White Sox for the 2021 season as a way to control his innings coming off two missed years. On May 26, Kopech threw a pitch and then slipped fell off the mound, leading him being placed on the injured list with a strained left hamstring. He returned to the active roster on June 30. Overall in 2021, Kopech appeared in 44 games (four starts) with a record of 4–3 with an ERA of 3.50 in 69 1/3 innings while striking out 103 batters. In the third game of the American League Division Series against the Houston Astros, Kopech picked up his first career postseason win despite allowing four hits, three runs (including a home run), and one walk in 2 1/3 innings. He also pitched in the next game, allowing three runs on three hits while only recording two outs as the White Sox were eliminated from the playoffs.

In 2022, Kopech returned to the starting rotation. During the season, he was on and off the injured list. He suffered a left knee strain against the Kansas City Royals on August 23 After he returned, he made two more starts before he was placed on the injured list again on September 17 with right shoulder inflammation, shutting him down for the season. Overall in 2022, Kopech made 25 starts posting a 5–9 record with a 3.54 ERA in 119 1/3 innings with 105 strikeouts and 57 walks. He led the major leagues in highest walk percentage, at 11.5%.

On January 13, 2023, Kopech agreed to a one-year, $2.05 million contract with the White Sox, avoiding salary arbitration. In his first start of 2023, Kopech gave up seven earned runs and five home runs, with four of those home runs coming in the fifth inning. In 30 games (27 starts), he posted a 5–12 record and 5.43 ERA with 134 strikeouts in 129 1/3 innings pitched. On September 22, he underwent season-ending surgery to remove a cyst from his right knee.

Despite preferring to remain a starter, the White Sox moved Kopech to the bullpen to start the 2024 season. On July 10, he became the second White Sox pitcher to throw an immaculate inning and the first since Sloppy Thurston in 1923 while recording a save against the Twins. In 43 games for the White Sox, he was 2–8 with a 4.74 ERA with 59 strikeouts and nine saves.

=== Los Angeles Dodgers ===
On July 29, 2024, the White Sox traded Kopech to the Los Angeles Dodgers as part of a three-team deal that also sent Tommy Edman and Oliver Gonzalez to Los Angeles, sent Erick Fedde and Tommy Pham to the St. Louis Cardinals, and sent Miguel Vargas, Alexander Albertus, and Jeral Pérez to the White Sox. In 24 games for the Dodgers, he had a 4–0 record, 1.13 ERA, 29 strikeouts and six saves in 24 innings.

Kopech also pitched for the Dodgers during the 2024 postseason, with 3 1/3 scoreless innings on only one hit while appearing in four of the five games in the 2024 NLDS. In the 2024 NLCS, he pitched two innings, and allowed one run, recording a win in Game 3 and starting the clinching game 6 as an opener. In the 2024 World Series, he allowed two runs on three hits in 3 2/3 innings over four games.

Kopech dealt with arm inflammation in the offseason, putting him behind in spring training, and as a result began the 2025 season on the injured list. He was transferred to the 60-day injured list on May 1 and did not rejoin the Dodgers roster until June 7. Upon returning, Kopech made eight scoreless appearances for the Dodgers, recording eight strikeouts across seven innings of work. On July 9, it was announced that he had undergone surgery to repair a torn meniscus in his right knee and he was placed back on the 60-day injured list. He again rejoined the Dodgers on September 1 but returned to the injured list on September 19, with right knee inflammation, ending his season. With all the injuries, he only pitched in 14 games and struggled with his command, walking 13 batters in 11 innings while allowing three runs.

== Personal life ==
In 2019, Kopech announced his engagement to Canadian actress Vanessa Morgan. Kopech and Morgan married in January 2020, but Kopech filed for divorce shortly thereafter in June 2020. Morgan gave birth to their son in January 2021. In May 2022, he took a brief paternity leave from the White Sox while he attended the birth of his second child, by his new girlfriend, fitness instructor Morgan Eudy. As of August 2023, Kopech and Eudy were engaged and expecting their second child together; Eudy also has a daughter from a previous relationship.
