= 2024 National League Championship Series =

Team (Wins)	Managers	Season
Los Angeles Dodgers (4)	Dave Roberts	98–64 (.605), GA: 5
New York Mets (2)	Carlos Mendoza	89–73 (.549), GB: 6
- Dates: October 13–20
- MVP: Tommy Edman (Los Angeles)
- Umpires: Jordan Baker, Marvin Hudson, Nic Lentz, Bill Miller (crew chief), Mike Muchlinski, David Rackley, Jeremie Rehak

Broadcast
- Television: Fox (Games 1–2); FS1 (Games 2–6)
- TV announcers: Joe Davis, John Smoltz, Ken Rosenthal, and Tom Verducci
- Radio: ESPN
- Radio announcers: Jon Sciambi and Doug Glanville
- NLDS: New York Mets over Philadelphia Phillies (3–1); Los Angeles Dodgers over San Diego Padres (3–2)

The 2024 National League Championship Series (NLCS) was the best-of-seven playoff in Major League Baseball's 2024 postseason between the overall #1 seed Los Angeles Dodgers and the sixth-seeded New York Mets for the National League (NL) pennant and the right to play in the 2024 World Series. The Dodgers won the series, four games to two, to become National League (NL) champions and advance to the World Series for the first time since 2020. For his performance, Dodgers utilityman Tommy Edman won the NL Championship Series Most Valuable Player Award.

The series began on October 13 and ended on October 20. Fox and FS1 televised the games in the U.S.

The Dodgers would go on to defeat the American League champion and the Mets fellow Subway Series rival New York Yankees in the 2024 World Series in five games to win their eighth World Series title in franchise history.

== Background ==
The Los Angeles Dodgers qualified for the postseason as the National League West division winner and the league's top seed. They clinched a playoff berth with a victory over the Marlins on September 19. This was the 12th consecutive season in which the Dodgers made the postseason, which remains the longest active playoff streak in major North American professional sports. The Dodgers clinched the National League West division with a victory over the Padres on September 26, their third consecutive division championship and 11th in the past 12 seasons. In the Division Series, they defeated their intrastate division rival San Diego Padres in five games to advance to the National League Championship Series for the first time since 2021 and the seventh time in 12 years (2013, 2016–2018, 2020–2021, and 2024). Their series win against San Diego in the NLDS was the first time that a higher-seeded team won that round in the NL since the Dodgers and Braves both did in 2020. This was Los Angeles' 16th National League Championship Series appearance, which leads the league.

The New York Mets qualified for the postseason as the sixth seed wild card entrant. They clinched a playoff berth for the second time in the past three seasons on September 30 following a victory against the Atlanta Braves in the first game of a doubleheader. In the Wild Card Series, they defeated the National League Central champion and third-seed Milwaukee Brewers in three games, highlighted by Pete Alonso's go-ahead three-run home run in the ninth inning in the winner-take-all Game 3. In the Division Series, they defeated the National League East champion and second-seed Philadelphia Phillies in four games, highlighted by Francisco Lindor's go-ahead grand slam in Game 4 in the sixth inning. The Mets advanced to the National League Championship Series for the first time since 2015, when they most recently won the pennant. The Mets are 64–37 since Grimace, a character from McDonaldland, threw out the first pitch on June 12, with the media, fans, and even the team using this moment as a rallying cry. This was the Mets' ninth appearance in the NLCS.

This was the third straight year that the sixth-seeded team advanced to the NLCS, with the 2022 Phillies and the 2023 Diamondbacks both accomplishing this feat and also the third straight year a sub 90–win team made the NLCS. Additionally, with the New York Yankees clinching an ALCS berth on October 10th, this is the furthest that both New York teams have gone in the postseason since 2000, when the Yankees beat the Mets in the World Series in five games.

This series marked the fourth postseason meeting between the Dodgers and the Mets. This was a rematch of the 1988 NLCS, which the Dodgers won in seven games en route to a World Series title. The other previous postseason meetings were in the 2006 NLDS and, most recently, the 2015 NLDS, both of which the Mets won. They swept the former series and won the latter in five games. The Dodgers won the 2024 regular season series against the Mets, 4–2.

== Summary ==
Los Angeles won the series, 4–2.

Game	Date	Score	Location	Time	Attendance
1	October 13	New York Mets – 0, Los Angeles Dodgers – 9	Dodger Stadium	2:52	53,503
2	October 14	New York Mets – 7, Los Angeles Dodgers – 3	Dodger Stadium	3:27	52,926
3	October 16	Los Angeles Dodgers – 8, New York Mets – 0	Citi Field	3:11	43,883
4	October 17	Los Angeles Dodgers – 10, New York Mets – 2	Citi Field	3:39	43,882
5	October 18	Los Angeles Dodgers – 6, New York Mets – 12	Citi Field	3:08	43,841
6	October 20	New York Mets – 5, Los Angeles Dodgers – 10	Dodger Stadium	3:15	52,674

== Game summaries ==
=== Game 1 ===
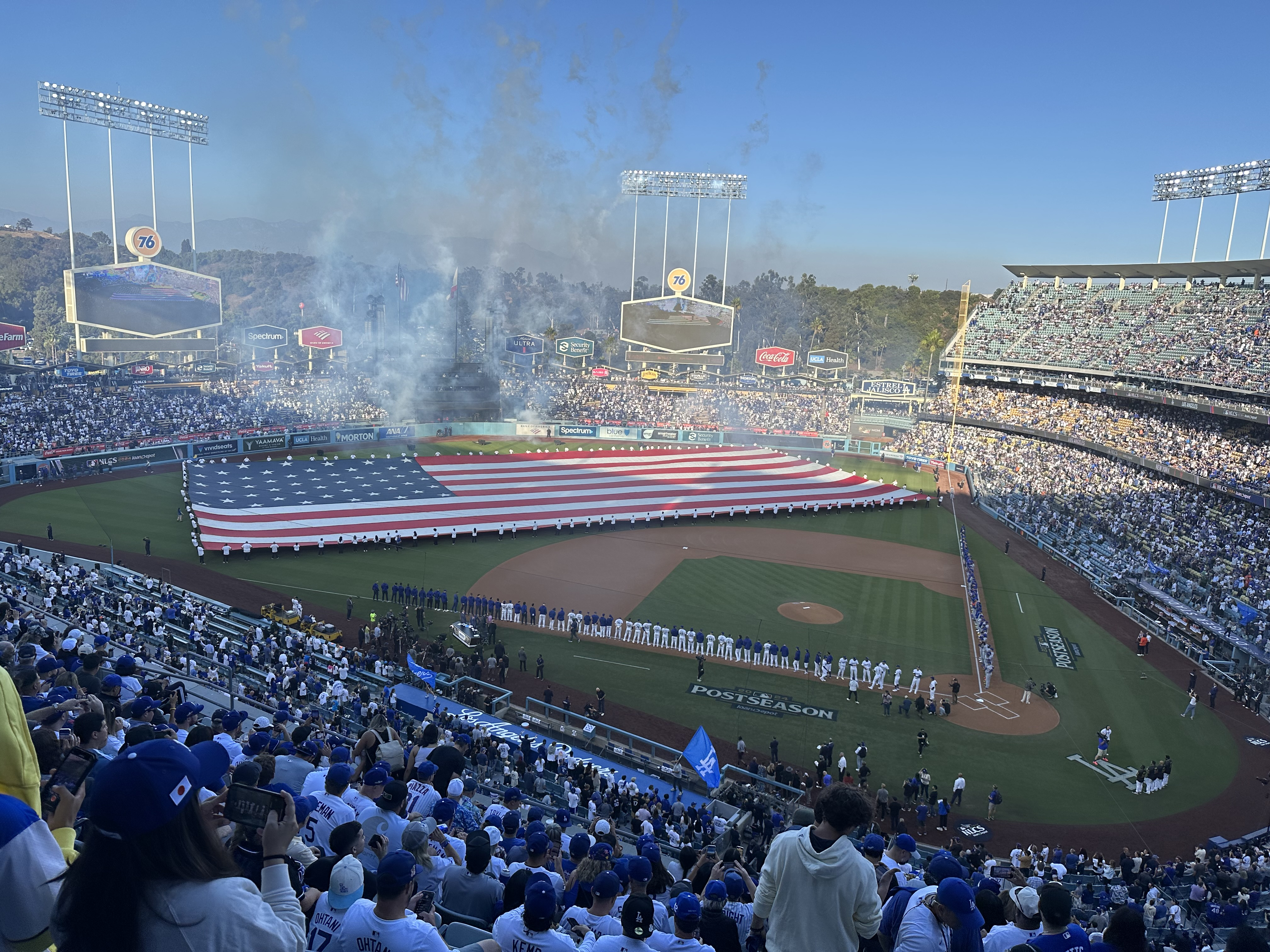
Pregame ceremonies for Game 1 of the 2024 NLCS at Dodger Stadium

October 13, 2024 5:15 pm (PDT) at Dodger Stadium in Los Angeles, California 73 °F (23 °C), Clear
Team	1	2	3	4	5	6	7	8	9	R	H	E
New York	0	0	0	0	0	0	0	0	0	0	3	2
Los Angeles	2	1	0	3	0	0	0	3	X	9	9	0
WP: Jack Flaherty (1–0) LP: Kodai Senga (0–1); Attendance: 53,503; Boxscore

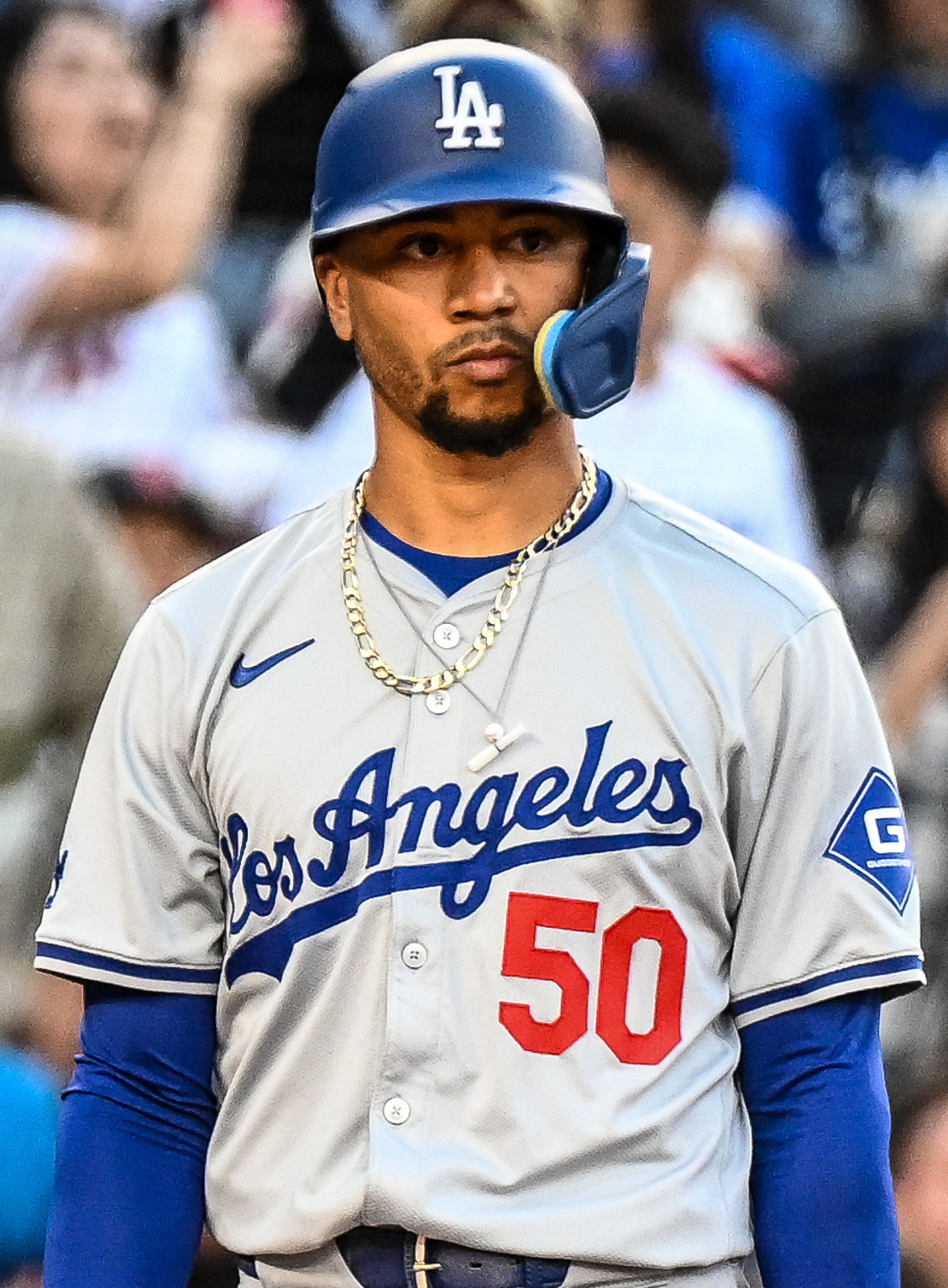
Mookie Betts hit a three-run double in the eighth inning of Game 1.

Kodai Senga, making just his third start in 2024 between the regular season and postseason, started Game 1 for the Mets opposite Los Angeles' Jack Flaherty. Max Muncy got the scoring started in the bottom of the first with a two-run single, scoring Mookie Betts and Freddie Freeman. In the bottom of the second, Shohei Ohtani hit an RBI single, scoring Gavin Lux to extend the Dodgers' lead to 3–0. Senga was removed from the game having pitched just 1 1/3 innings, allowing three earned runs and throwing just 10 of 30 pitches for strikes. In the bottom of the fourth, Tommy Edman hit an RBI single, scoring Enrique Hernández to extend the score to 4–0. Ohtani then hit an RBI single, scoring Edman as he advanced to second base after a fielding error by Starling Marte. Freeman then extended the Dodgers' lead to 6–0 after hitting an RBI single, scoring Ohtani. Flaherty allowed only two hits while striking out six in seven scoreless innings. In the bottom of the eighth, Mookie Betts hit a bases-clearing double, scoring Hernández, Kevin Kiermaier, and Ohtani as the Dodgers lead then became 9–0. The Dodgers shut out the Mets, 9–0 to take Game 1 of the series.

This was the third consecutive shutout for the Dodgers, tying the all-time Major League record of 33 consecutive scoreless innings during the postseason. They became the third team ever to pitch three consecutive postseason shutouts, joining the 1905 New York Giants and the 1966 Baltimore Orioles.

=== Game 2 ===
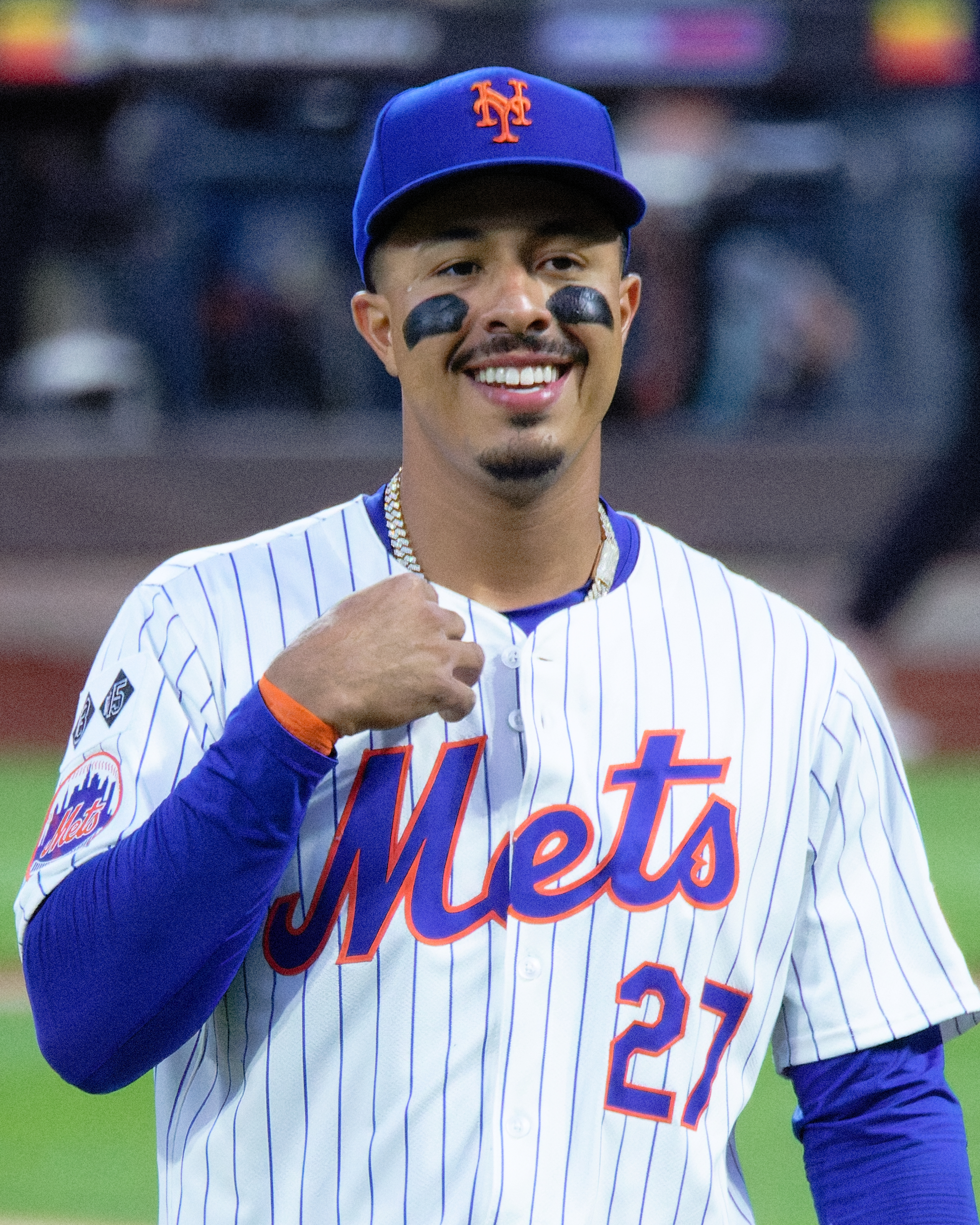
Mark Vientos hit a grand slam in Game 2.

October 14, 2024 1:08 pm (PDT) at Dodger Stadium in Los Angeles, California 73 °F (23 °C), Partly Cloudy
Team	1	2	3	4	5	6	7	8	9	R	H	E
New York	1	5	0	0	0	0	0	0	1	7	10	1
Los Angeles	0	0	0	0	1	2	0	0	0	3	3	1
WP: Sean Manaea (1–0) LP: Ryan Brasier (0–1) Sv: Edwin Díaz (1); Home runs: NYM: Francisco Lindor (1), Mark Vientos (1); LAD: Max Muncy (1); Attendance: 52,926; Boxscore

Francisco Lindor got the scoring started in the top of the first with a leadoff home run off Ryan Brasier, snapping the Dodgers' consecutive postseason scoreless inning streak of 33. In the top of the second, Tyrone Taylor hit an RBI double, scoring Starling Marte to make it 2–0. Mark Vientos then hit a grand slam home run to extend the Mets' lead to 6–0. In the bottom of the fifth, Max Muncy hit a solo home run off Sean Manaea to score the first run for the Dodgers. In the bottom of the sixth, Tommy Edman hit a two-run single, scoring Mookie Betts and Teoscar Hernández to cut the Mets' lead to 6–3. Marte hit an RBI single in the top of the ninth, scoring Pete Alonso to extend the Mets' lead to 7–3. Edwin Díaz got a four-out save for the Mets to tie the series as the NLCS shifts to Queens, NY for Game 3.

=== Game 3 ===
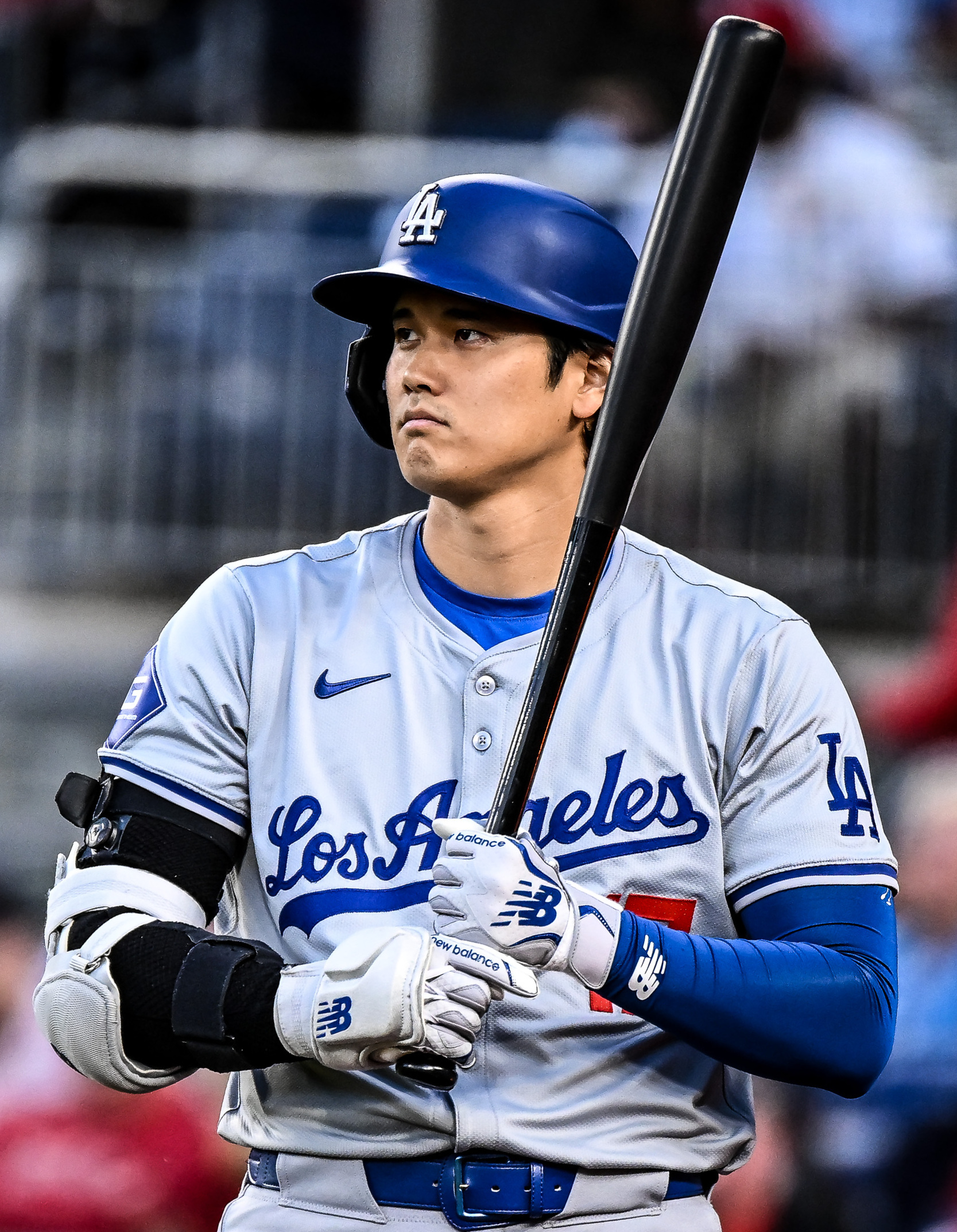
Shohei Ohtani hit a three-run home run in Game 3.

October 16, 2024 8:08 pm (EDT) at Citi Field in Queens, New York 51 °F (11 °C), Clear
Team	1	2	3	4	5	6	7	8	9	R	H	E
Los Angeles	0	2	0	0	0	2	0	3	1	8	10	0
New York	0	0	0	0	0	0	0	0	0	0	4	1
WP: Michael Kopech (1–0) LP: Luis Severino (0–1); Home runs: LAD: Enrique Hernández (1), Shohei Ohtani (1), Max Muncy (2); NYM: None; Attendance: 43,883; Boxscore

Game 3 featured pitchers Luis Severino for the Mets and Walker Buehler for the Dodgers. The Dodgers got the ball rolling when they scored two runs in the top of the second when Will Smith hit an RBI single, scoring Max Muncy. Then Tommy Edman hit a sacrifice fly, scoring Teoscar Hernández to give the Dodgers an early 2–0 lead. In the bottom of the second, Buehler escaped a one-out bases-loaded jam without surrendering a run by striking out Francisco Álvarez and Francisco Lindor to preserve the lead for the Dodgers. In the top of the sixth, Enrique Hernández hit a two-run home run off Reed Garrett to extend the Dodgers' lead to 4–0, scoring Edman. In the top of the eighth, Shohei Ohtani hit a three-run home run off Tylor Megill, and then in the ninth, Max Muncy hit a solo home run, also off Megill, extending the Dodgers' lead to 8–0. It was Muncy's 13th career postseason home run with the Dodgers, tying Justin Turner and Corey Seager for the franchise record. The Dodgers' bullpen held the Mets scoreless most of the game for their second shutout as they took a 2–1 series lead.

With that win, the Dodgers became the first team to have three shutout wins by seven or more runs in a single postseason. Also, it was the first time that the Dodgers had three shutout wins by seven or more runs in a five-game span in franchise history.

Max Muncy did not make an out in five plate appearances in Game 4.

=== Game 4 ===
October 17, 2024 8:08 pm (EDT) at Citi Field in Queens, New York 53 °F (12 °C), Clear
Team	1	2	3	4	5	6	7	8	9	R	H	E
Los Angeles	1	0	2	2	0	2	0	3	0	10	12	0
New York	1	0	1	0	0	0	0	0	0	2	8	0
WP: Evan Phillips (1–0) LP: José Quintana (0–1); Home runs: LAD: Shohei Ohtani (2), Mookie Betts (1); NYM: Mark Vientos (2); Attendance: 43,882; Boxscore

Game 4 featured pitchers José Quintana for the Mets and Yoshinobu Yamamoto for the Dodgers. In the top of the first, Shohei Ohtani hit a leadoff solo home run off Quintana to give the Dodgers an early lead at 1–0. At the bottom of the first, the Mets answered with a home run of their own when Mark Vientos hit a solo home run off Yamamoto. It was Vientos' 12th RBI in the postseason, tying Curtis Granderson and John Olerud for the franchise record for most RBIs in a single postseason. In the top of the third, Tommy Edman hit an RBI double, scoring Ohtani and Enrique Hernández delivered an RBI single, scoring Mookie Betts to extend the Dodgers' lead to 3–1. In the bottom of the third, Brandon Nimmo got out via a groundout, but scored Francisco Álvarez to cut the Dodgers' lead to 3–2. In the top of the fourth, Betts hit a two-run RBI double to score Chris Taylor and Ohtani, extending the Dodgers' lead to 5–2. In the top of the sixth, Betts hit a two-run home run off Phil Maton to extend the Dodgers' lead to 7–2, scoring Ohtani again. In the bottom of the sixth, after Evan Phillips loaded the bases without recording an out, Blake Treinen escaped a bases-loaded jam without surrendering a run to preserve a five-run lead for the Dodgers. In the top of the eighth, Edman hit a two-run RBI double to score Betts and Kevin Kiermaier, extending the Dodgers' lead to 9–2. Catcher Will Smith then hit an RBI single to score Edman to make it 10–2. Edgardo Henriquez closed out the game for a blowout victory for the Dodgers to extend their series lead to 3–1.

Max Muncy had three walks and a single in his first four plate appearances in the game, extending his on-base streak to 12 straight appearances, a record for a single playoff series, and tied with Reggie Jackson for overall playoff appearances.

=== Game 5 ===
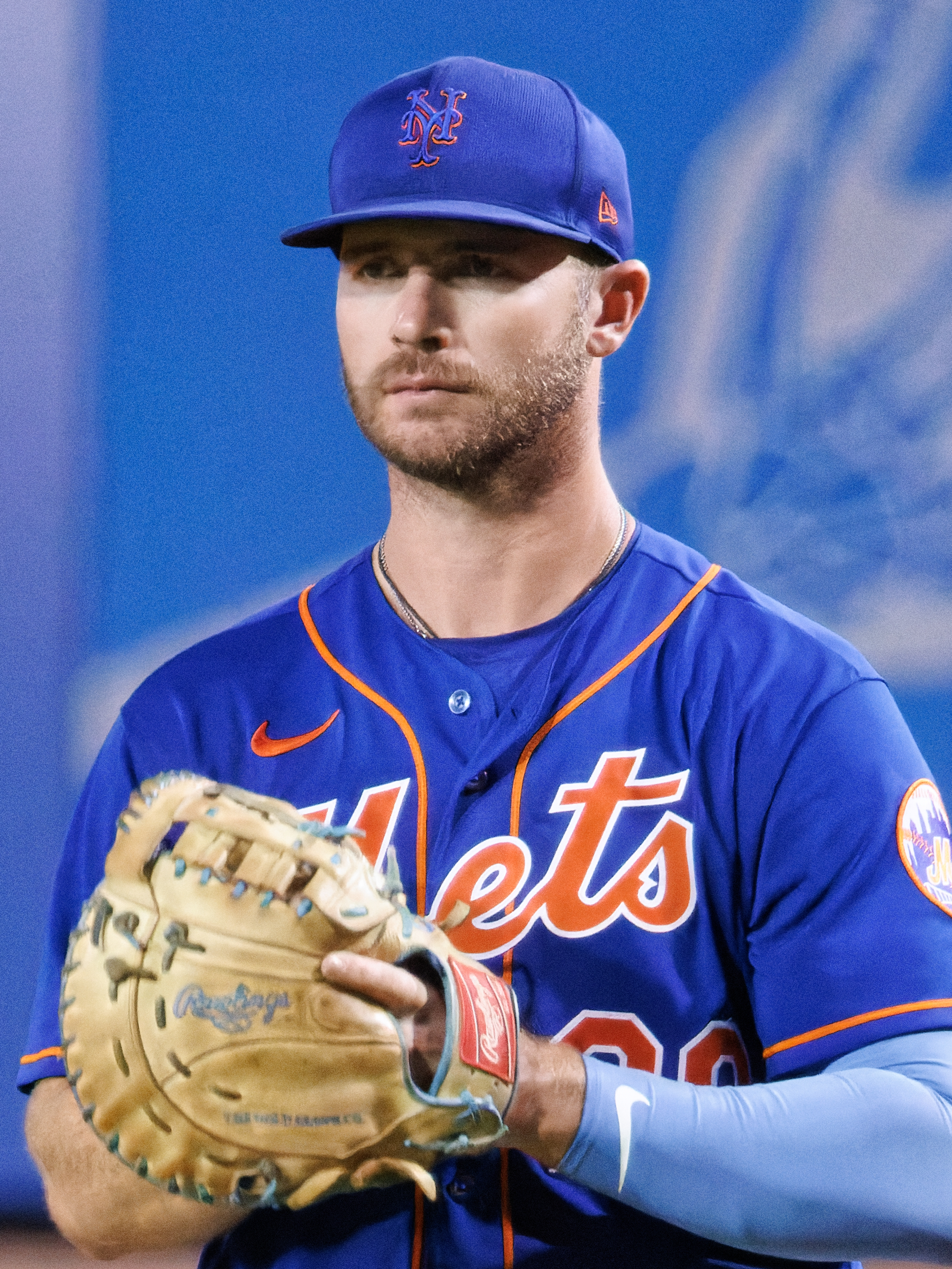
Pete Alonso hit a three-run home run in the first inning of Game 5.

October 18, 2024 5:08 pm (EDT) at Citi Field in Queens, New York 67 °F (19 °C), Clear
Team	1	2	3	4	5	6	7	8	9	R	H	E
Los Angeles	0	1	0	1	3	1	0	0	0	6	8	0
New York	3	0	5	2	0	1	0	1	X	12	14	0
WP: Ryne Stanek (1–0) LP: Jack Flaherty (1–1); Home runs: LAD: Andy Pages 2 (2), Mookie Betts (2); NYM: Pete Alonso (1); Attendance: 43,841; Boxscore

Game 5 featured starting pitchers David Peterson for the Mets and Jack Flaherty for the Dodgers in his second NLCS start. In the top of the first, the Dodgers hit a single and double to put two runners in scoring position, however, David Peterson stranded both of them. In the bottom of the first, Pete Alonso hit a three-run home run off Flaherty to give the Mets an early lead. In the top of the second, Enrique Hernández put the Dodgers on the board via a wild pitch by Peterson to cut the Mets' lead to 3–1. In the bottom of the third, Starling Marte hit a two-run RBI double to score Alonso and Jesse Winker. Francisco Álvarez then hit an RBI single followed by a two-run RBI triple by Francisco Lindor followed by an RBI single by Brandon Nimmo as the Mets blew the door wide open with a five-run third inning. In the top of the fourth, Andy Pages hit a solo home run off Peterson to cut the Mets' lead to 8–2. Reed Garrett escaped a two-out bases-loaded jam in the top of the fourth after striking out Freddie Freeman to prevent the Dodgers from putting more runs on the board. In the bottom of the fourth, Winker hit an RBI triple to extend the Mets' lead to 9–2. Jeff McNeil then hit a sacrifice fly extending the lead to 10–2. In the top of the fifth, Pages hit a three-run home run off Garrett for his second home run of the game to cut the Dodgers' deficit to 10–5. In the top of the sixth, Mookie Betts hit a solo home run off Ryne Stanek to cut the deficit to 10–6. In the bottom of the sixth, Jeff McNeil hit a sacrifice fly, scoring Winker to extend the lead to 11–6. In the bottom of the eighth, Marte hit an RBI single, scoring Alonso to make the final score 12–6. Edwin Díaz closed the game as the Mets avoided elimination to force Game 6 and send the series back to Los Angeles.

The Mets’ 12 runs were the second most they scored in a postseason game in franchise history, tied with Game 4 of the 2006 NLCS and behind only Game 3 of the 2015 NLDS, where they scored 13 (also against the Dodgers at Citi Field).

The Mets did not strike out during the game, marking the first time since Game 2 of the 2002 World Series that a team did not strike out in a playoff game.

=== Game 6 ===
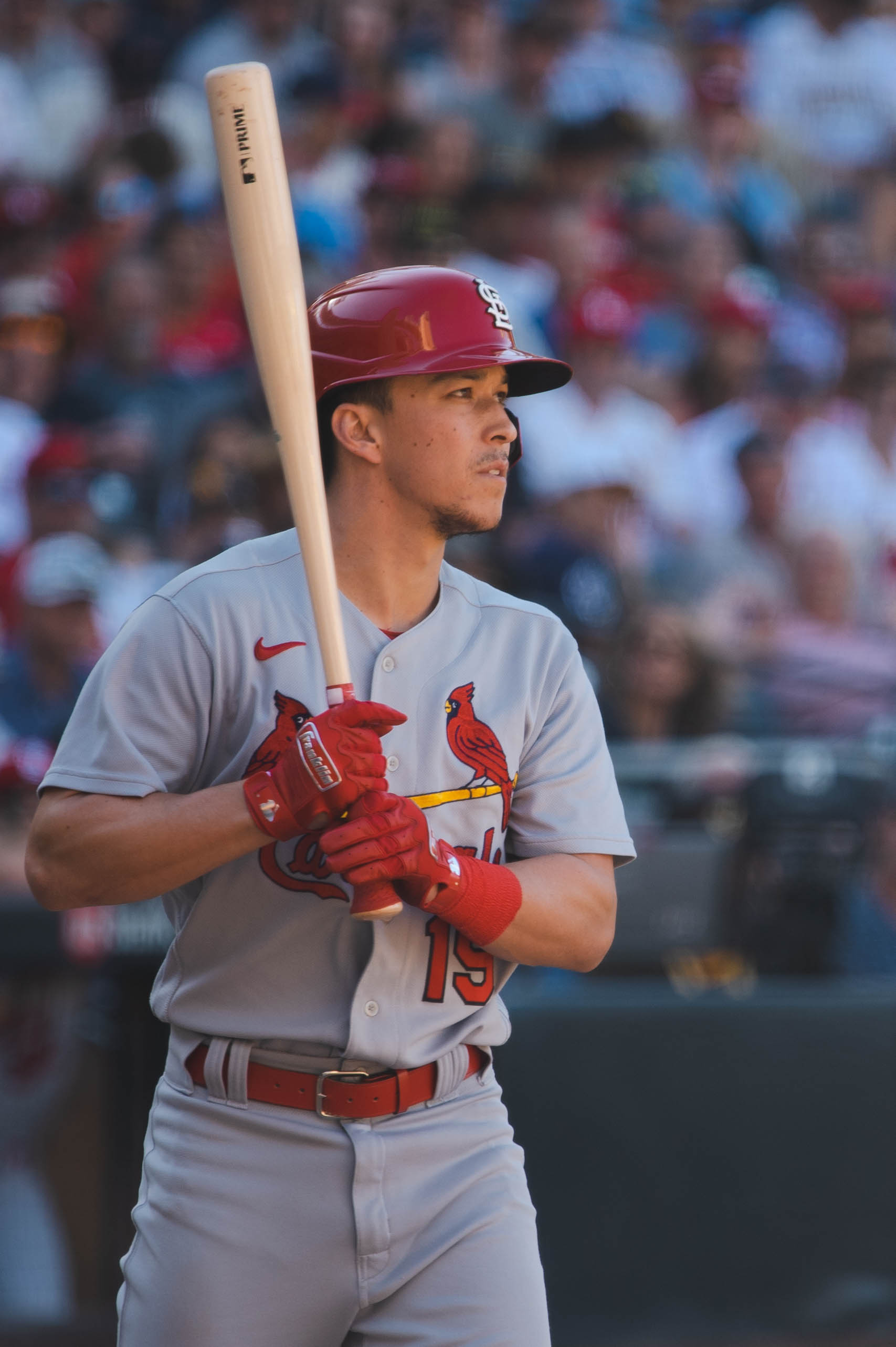
Tommy Edman drove in four runs including a two-run homer in Game 6, and was crowned NLCS Most Valuable Player.

October 20, 2024 5:08 pm (PDT) at Dodger Stadium in Los Angeles, California 78 °F (26 °C), Clear
Team	1	2	3	4	5	6	7	8	9	R	H	E
New York	1	0	0	2	0	0	1	0	1	5	11	0
Los Angeles	2	0	4	0	0	1	0	3	X	10	11	1
WP: Ben Casparius (1–0) LP: Sean Manaea (1–1) Sv: Blake Treinen (1); Home runs: NYM: Mark Vientos (3); LAD: Tommy Edman (1), Will Smith (1); Attendance: 52,674; Boxscore

Game 6 featured starting pitchers Sean Manaea for the Mets in his second NLCS start and Michael Kopech leading a bullpen game for the Dodgers. In the top of the first, Pete Alonso hit an RBI single to score Francisco Lindor for the Mets to take an early 1–0 lead. In the bottom of the first, the Dodgers answered back with Tommy Edman hitting a two-run RBI double to score Shohei Ohtani and Teoscar Hernández, taking the lead at 2–1, which was the first lead change of the series. In the top of the third, Anthony Banda escaped a two-out bases-loaded jam without surrendering any runs. In the bottom of the third, Tommy Edman hit a two-run home run off Manaea and Will Smith then hit a two-run home run off Phil Maton to extend the Dodgers' lead to 6–1. In the top of the fourth, Mark Vientos hit a two-run home run off Ryan Brasier to cut the Dodgers' lead to 6–3. In the top of the sixth, the Mets loaded the bases against Evan Phillips but were unable to score. In the bottom of the sixth, Ohtani hit an RBI single to score Smith and in the top of the seventh, Álvarez hit a sacrifice fly with one out to score Tyrone Taylor making it a 7–4 game. In the bottom of the eighth, Mookie Betts hit an RBI double, Teoscar Hernández then hit a sacrifice fly to score Ohtani and Enrique Hernández hit an RBI single to score Edman making the score 10–4. In the top of the ninth, Jeff McNeil hit an RBI single cut the lead to 10–5. Blake Treinen worked the last two innings for the save as the Dodgers moved on to the World Series, their first appearance since 2020. It was the first time the Dodgers clinched a pennant at Dodger Stadium since 1988, which also came against the Mets. Tommy Edman won the NL Championship Series Most Valuable Player Award for collecting 11 hits (including 3 doubles and a home run) and driving in a total of 11 runs in this series.

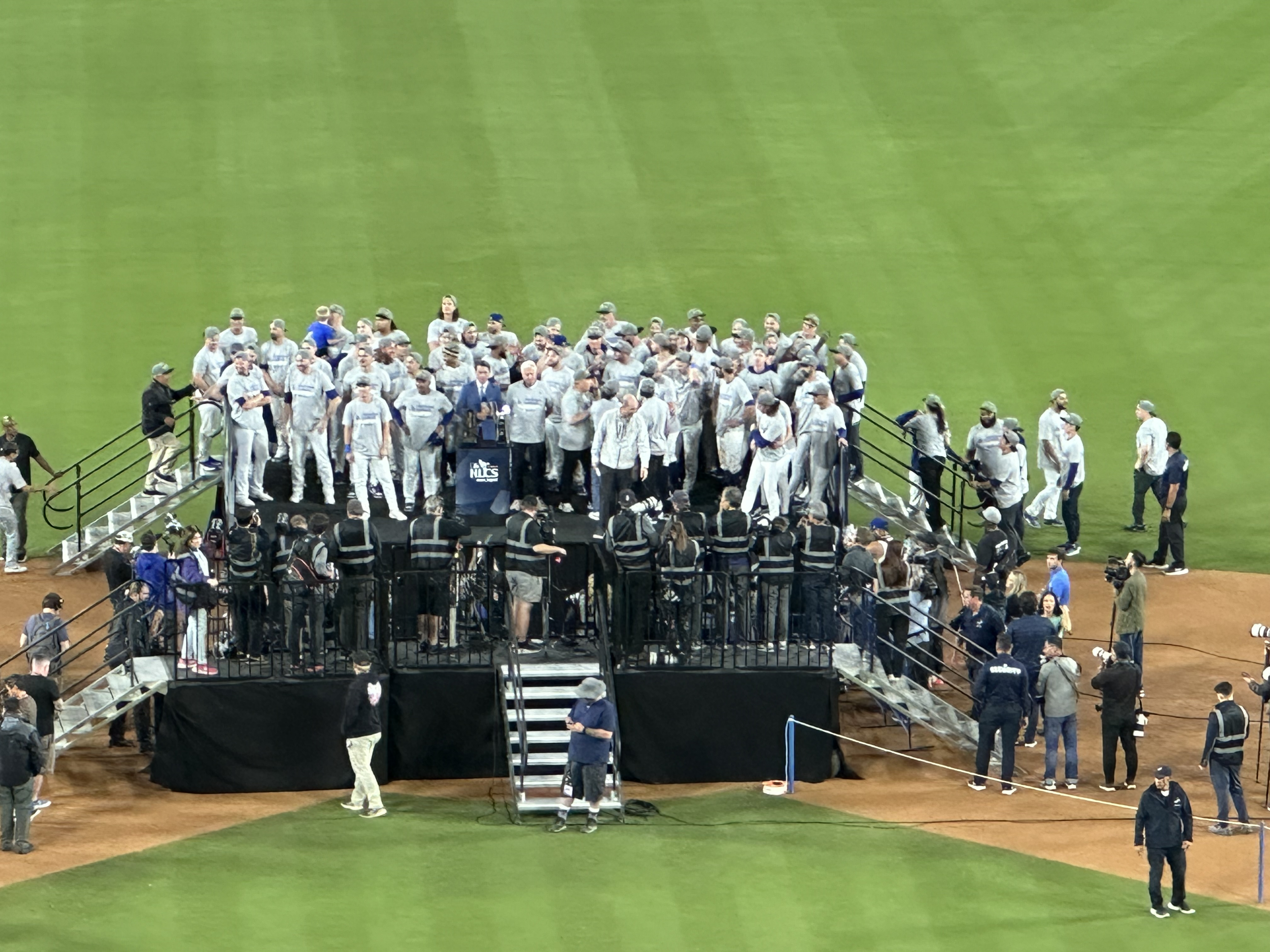
Trophy ceremony after game 6 of the 2024 NLCS

The 2024 NLCS had an average margin of victory of 6.7, the highest in MLB postseason history. The Dodgers scored 46 runs in the series, which set an LCS record, two more than the Atlanta Braves in the 1996 NLCS, and was the second-most runs scored by a team in any postseason series, behind only the New York Yankees in the 1960 World Series, who scored 55 runs in seven games (the Yankees famously lost this series to the Pittsburgh Pirates). The Dodgers also became only the third team in history to outscore their opponent in the NLCS by 20 or more runs, joining the 1996 Braves and 2017 Dodgers. The nine runs scored by Ohtani in the series set a new Dodgers postseason record, surpassing Corey Seager's 2020 NLCS mark by one and the Dodgers walked 42 times in the series, a major league record, surpassing the previous mark of 40 set by the St. Louis Cardinals in the 2011 World Series and Cleveland Indians in the 1997 World Series.

With the Mets' loss, they were the first team to defeat the Milwaukee Brewers in the postseason and not make the World Series.

=== Composite line score ===
2024 NLCS (4–2): Los Angeles Dodgers beat New York Mets

Team	1	2	3	4	5	6	7	8	9	R	H	E
New York Mets	6	5	6	4	0	1	1	1	2	26	50	4
Los Angeles Dodgers	5	4	6	6	4	8	0	12	1	46	53	2
Total attendance: 290,709 Average attendance: 48,451

== See also ==
- 2024 American League Championship Series
