= Mark Vientos =

American baseball player (born 1999)

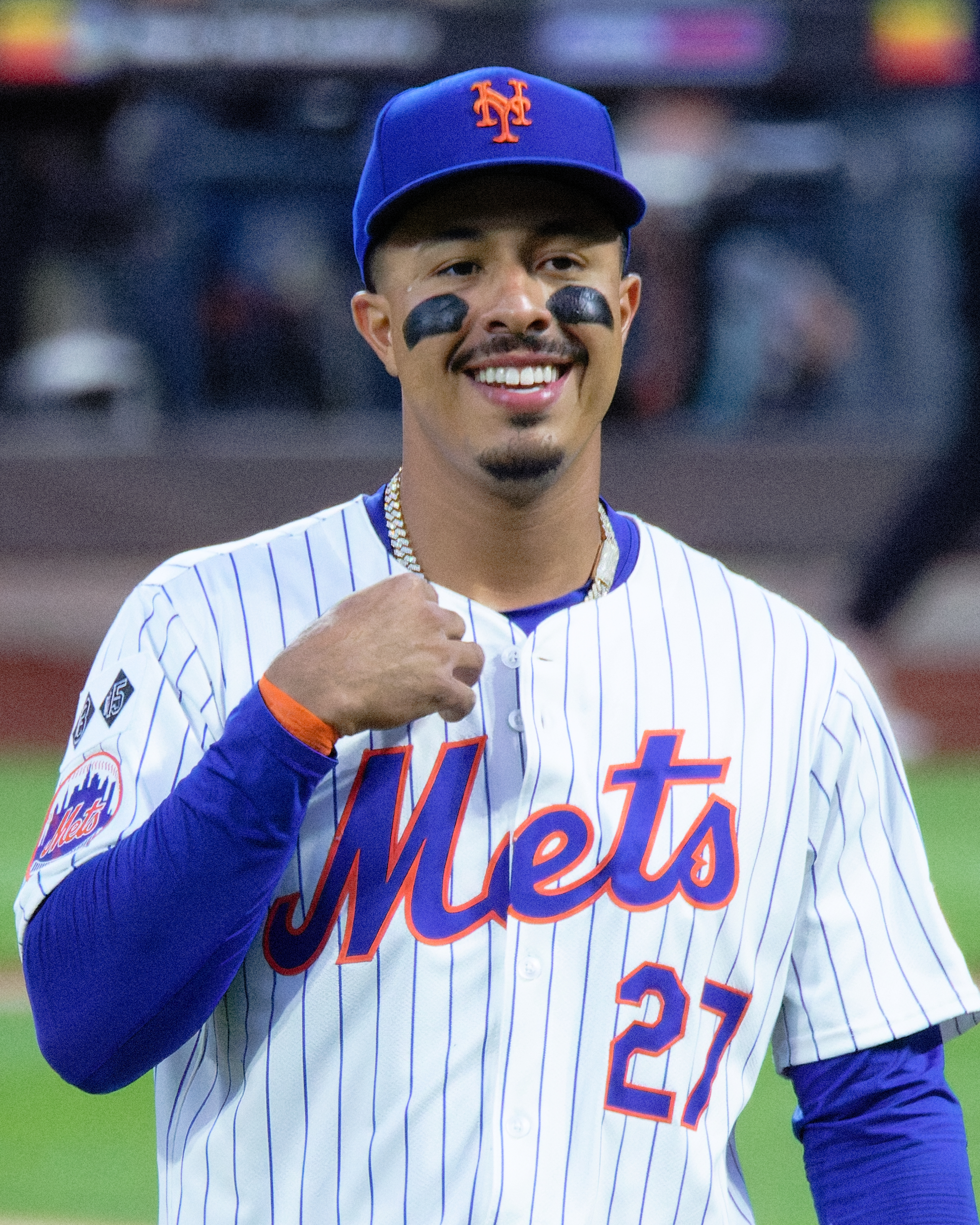
- Vientos with the Mets in 2024

New York Mets – No. 27
- Third baseman / First baseman / Designated hitter
- Born: December 11, 1999 (age 26); Norwalk, Connecticut, U.S.
- Bats: Right Throws: Right

MLB debut
- September 11, 2022, for the New York Mets

MLB statistics (through 2026 season)
- Batting average: .234
- Home runs: 67
- Runs batted in: 198
- Stats at Baseball Reference

Teams
- New York Mets (2022–present)
Medals
Men's baseball
Representing United States
15U Baseball World Cup
Silver medal – second place	2014 Mazatlán	Team

Mark Anthony Vientos (born December 11, 1999), nicknamed "Swaggy V", is an American professional baseball third baseman, designated hitter, and first baseman for the New York Mets of Major League Baseball (MLB). He was selected by the Mets in the second round of the 2017 MLB draft and made his MLB debut in 2022.

== Early life and amateur career ==
Vientos was born in Norwalk, Connecticut. His mother Katy Wilmor was born in Nicaragua, while his father Carlos Manuel "Charles" Vientos was born in the Dominican Republic but was raised in New York. Vientos's father became a fan of the New York Mets and taught him to play the game and root for the Mets.

Vientos has cited Alex Rodriguez and Manny Machado as early role models because of their "swagger," their origins in Miami, and their career trajectories, in which both players transitioned from playing shortstop to third base. Vientos also grew up a fan of former Mets captain David Wright, another third baseman. He wore Wright's number 5 in his youth.

Vientos spent his first three years of high school at Charles W. Flanagan High School in Pembroke Pines, Florida. In 2016 as a junior, he hit .321. That summer, he played in the Perfect Game All-American Classic at Petco Park. He transferred to American Heritage School in Plantation, Florida for his senior year in 2017. As a senior, he hit .417 over 26 games. He was selected by the Mets in the second round (59th overall) of the 2017 Major League Baseball draft. Vientos signed with the Mets for $1.5 million, forgoing his commitment to play college baseball for the Miami Hurricanes.

== Professional career ==
After signing with the Mets, Vientos made his professional debut with the rookie-level Gulf Coast League Mets before being promoted to the Kingsport Mets of the rookie-level Appalachian League. Over 51 games between the two clubs, he batted .262 with four home runs and 26 RBIs. He returned to Kingsport in 2018, slashing .287/.389/.489 with 11 home runs and 52 RBI in 60 games. In 2019, he played with the Columbia Fireflies of the Single–A South Atlantic League, hitting .255/.300/.411 with 12 home runs, 62 RBI, and 27 doubles over 111 games. After the season, he was named the Mets Minor League Hitter of the Year.

Vientos did not play a minor league game in 2020 due to the cancellation of the minor league season caused by the COVID-19 pandemic. To begin the 2021 season, he was assigned to the Binghamton Rumble Ponies of the Double-A Northeast. After slashing .281/.346/.580 with 22 home runs and 59 RBIs over 72 games, he was promoted to the Triple-A Syracuse Mets in early September. In 11 games with Syracuse, Vientos batted .278 with three home runs.

On November 19, 2021, the Mets selected Vientos' contract and added him to the 40-man roster. He returned to Syracuse to begin the 2022 season. In early June, he was placed on the injured list with knee discomfort, but returned just a little over a week later. He was selected to represent the Mets at the 2022 All-Star Futures Game alongside Francisco Álvarez. In 101 games with Syracuse, he slashed .280/.358/.519 with 24 home runs and 72 RBI.

=== Major leagues ===
==== 2022 ====
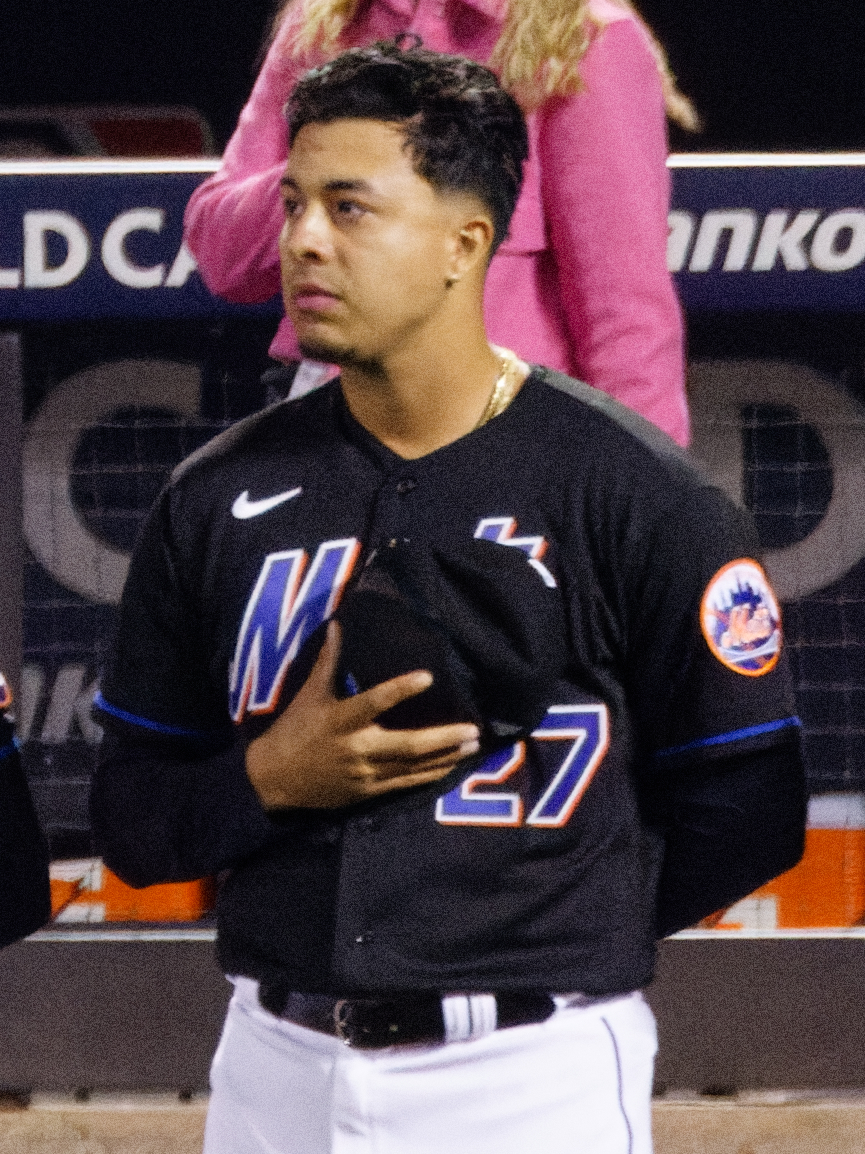
Vientos with the Mets in 2022

On September 10, 2022, the Mets promoted Vientos to the major leagues. He made his MLB debut the next day at Marlins Park versus the Miami Marlins as the team's designated hitter, going hitless over five at-bats with two strikeouts as the Mets won 9–3. On September 15, Vientos recorded his first major league hit, a single off Eric Stout of the Pittsburgh Pirates. On September 24, he hit his first major league home run, off Oakland Athletics starter Ken Waldichuk.

==== 2023 ====
Vientos was optioned to Triple-A Syracuse to begin the 2023 season. Through May 16, 2023, Vientos had 13 home runs and an on-base plus slugging percentage (OPS) of 1.104. On May 17, the Mets promoted Vientos to the major leagues in an effort to spark their struggling offense. He started at third base that night against the Tampa Bay Rays and hit a game-tying home run in the 7th inning. On September 20, Vientos hit two home runs in an 8–3 victory over the Miami Marlins, the first multi-homer game of his career. Across 65 games for New York in 2023, Vientos batted .211/.253/.367 with 9 home runs and 22 RBI.

==== 2024 ====
Vientos was again optioned to Triple–A Syracuse to begin the 2024 season, but was later called up on April 27 for the remainder of a series against the St. Louis Cardinals after Starling Marte was transferred to the bereavement list. In that series, he would go 3-for-4 with two RBIs and his first career walk-off home run in the 11th inning to avoid a sweep as the Mets defeated the Cardinals 4–2. On April 30, after Marte was activated from the bereavement list, Vientos was demoted back to Triple–A Syracuse. However, on May 15, he was promoted back to the major leagues after Joey Wendle was designated for assignment.

On September 6 in a game against the Cincinnati Reds, Vientos hit a walk-off two-run homer in the bottom of the 10th inning off of pitcher Justin Wilson, giving the Mets a 6–4 victory and their 8th straight win, keeping their playoff hopes alive. In 2024, Vientos played in 111 games for the Mets, batting .266/.322/.516 with a career-high 27 home runs and 71 RBI.

In his postseason debut, Vientos hit a go-ahead 2-RBI single in Game 1 of the 2024 National League Wild Card Series. In Game 2 of the 2024 NL Division Series against the Philadelphia Phillies, he hit a go-ahead two-run home run to give the Mets a 2–0 lead, and later hit another two-run home run to tie the game 6–6, which marked his first two career postseason home runs.

In Game 2 of the 2024 NL Championship Series against the Los Angeles Dodgers, Vientos hit a grand slam in the 2nd inning to give the Mets a 6–0 lead, eventually leading them to a 7–3 win and tying the series 1–1. It was also the third postseason grand slam in Mets history. During the postseason, Vientos slashed .327/.362/.636 with 5 home runs and 14 RBIs with the 14 RBIs setting a Mets franchise record for postseason RBI in a single season.

==== 2025 ====
Vientos was placed on the 10-day injured list with a hamstring strain after tweaking it from running out of the batter's box during a game at Dodger Stadium on June 2. He returned to the team on June 27. On July 28 against the San Diego Padres, Vientos hit his first career grand slam off of pitcher Dylan Cease to give the Mets a 5–1 lead in the 5th inning, however, they would go on to lose the game 7–6. In 121 games for the Mets in 2025, Vientos batted .233/.289/.413 with 17 home runs and 61 RBI.

==== 2026 ====
On July 10, 2026, Vientos was placed on the 10-day injured list due to a fractured hand after being hit by a pitch. On August 31, 2026 Vientos was activated from the injured list and returned to the Mets.

== International career and eligibility ==
Vientos has appeared at the youth level for the United States and captured a silver medal at the 2014 15U Baseball World Cup.

At the senior level, in addition to the United States, Vientos would also be eligible to represent the Dominican Republic or Nicaragua in the World Baseball Classic, due to the places of birth of his parents. He would also be able to represent Puerto Rico (and even be rostered as a domestic player in the Liga de Béisbol Profesional Roberto Clemente), since his paternal grandfather was born in Mayagüez, Puerto Rico in 1945. That means Vientos is effectively eligible for four different countries in tournaments such as the World Baseball Classic.

Prior to the 2023 World Baseball Classic, it was initially reported that Vientos would play for Nicaragua but he ultimately did not appear in the tournament, opting to instead participate in Mets spring training.
