= Tommy Edman =

American baseball player (born 1995)

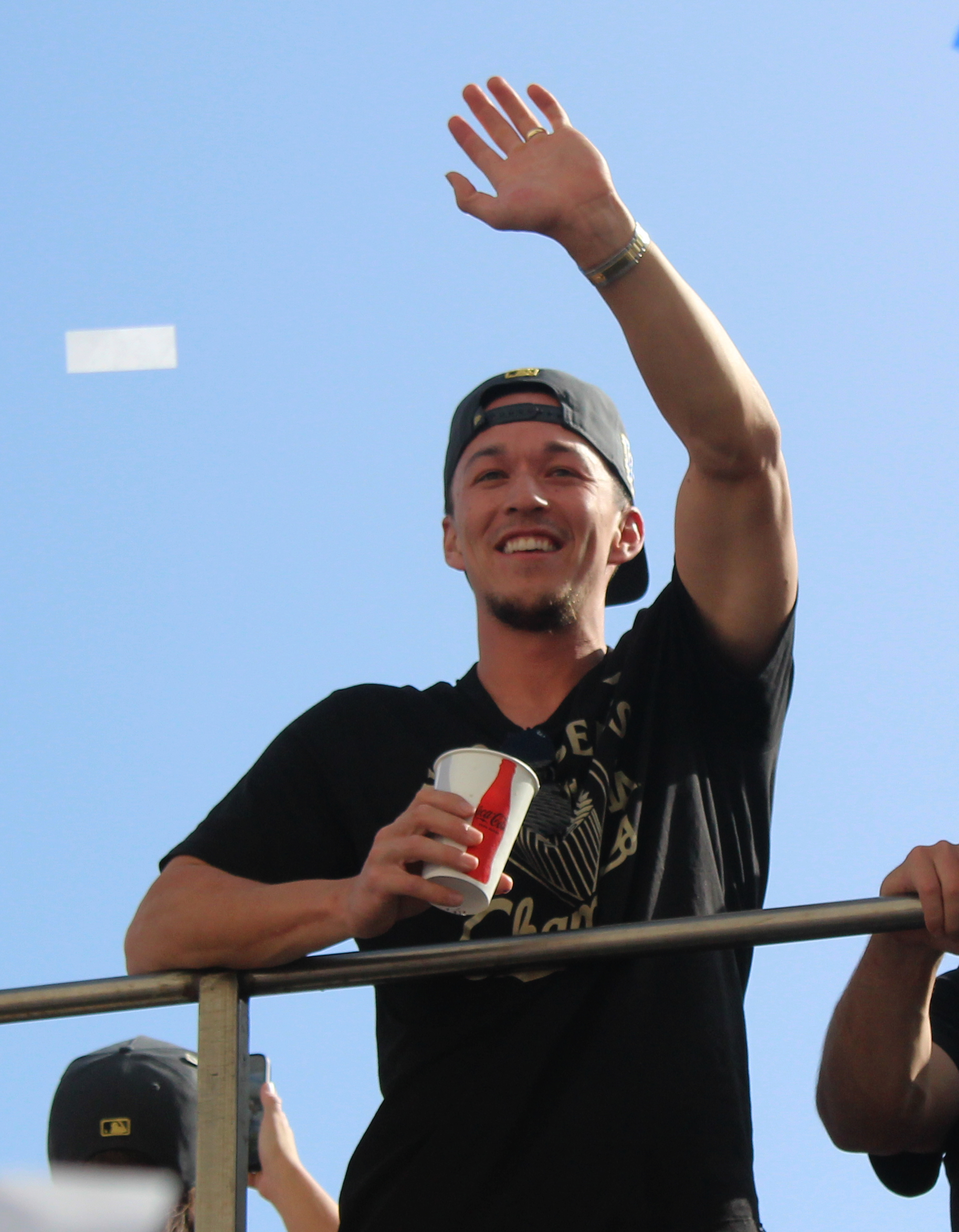
- Edman at the Dodgers parade in 2025

Los Angeles Dodgers – No. 25
- Utility player
- Born: May 9, 1995 (age 31); Pontiac, Michigan, U.S.
- Bats: Switch Throws: Right

MLB debut
- June 8, 2019, for the St. Louis Cardinals

MLB statistics (through 2026 season)
- Batting average: .257
- Home runs: 80
- Runs batted in: 333
- Stats at Baseball Reference

Teams
- St. Louis Cardinals (2019–2023); Los Angeles Dodgers (2024–present)

Career highlights and awards
- 2× World Series champion (2024, 2025); NLCS MVP (2024); Gold Glove Award (2021)

Thomas Hyunsu Edman (Korean: 곽현수; Hanja: 郭賢洙; born May 9, 1995) is an American professional baseball utility player for the Los Angeles Dodgers of Major League Baseball (MLB). He has previously played in MLB for the St. Louis Cardinals. Edman also represents the South Korean national team in international competition.

Born in Pontiac, Michigan, and raised in San Diego, Edman played college baseball for the Stanford Cardinal for three seasons before the Cardinals selected him in the sixth round of the 2016 Major League Baseball draft. He played in their minor league system before making his MLB debut in 2019 and quickly becoming a part of their starting lineup, playing various infield and outfield positions. He won a Gold Glove Award as the National League's top defensive second baseman in 2021. The Cardinals traded Edman to the Dodgers at the 2024 trade deadline, where he won NLCS MVP honors and helped the Dodgers win the 2024 World Series.

== Amateur career ==
Edman graduated from La Jolla Country Day School in La Jolla, California in 2013, where he was selected to an All-Academic Team. He attended Stanford University, where he played college baseball for the Stanford Cardinal. After his freshman year, he played collegiate summer baseball for the Newport Gulls in the New England Collegiate League, where he was named an All-Star and was named best defensive player. After his sophomore season in 2015, he played summer ball for the Yarmouth–Dennis Red Sox of the Cape Cod Baseball League, where he batted .304, was named starting second baseman for the East Division All-Star team, and helped lead the Red Sox to the league championship. As a junior in 2016, Edman started every game at shortstop and batted .286 with 24 RBIs and led Stanford in runs (35), hits (61), triples (4) and stolen bases (8) in 54 games, earning a spot on the Pac-12 Conference first team.

== Professional career ==
=== Minor leagues ===
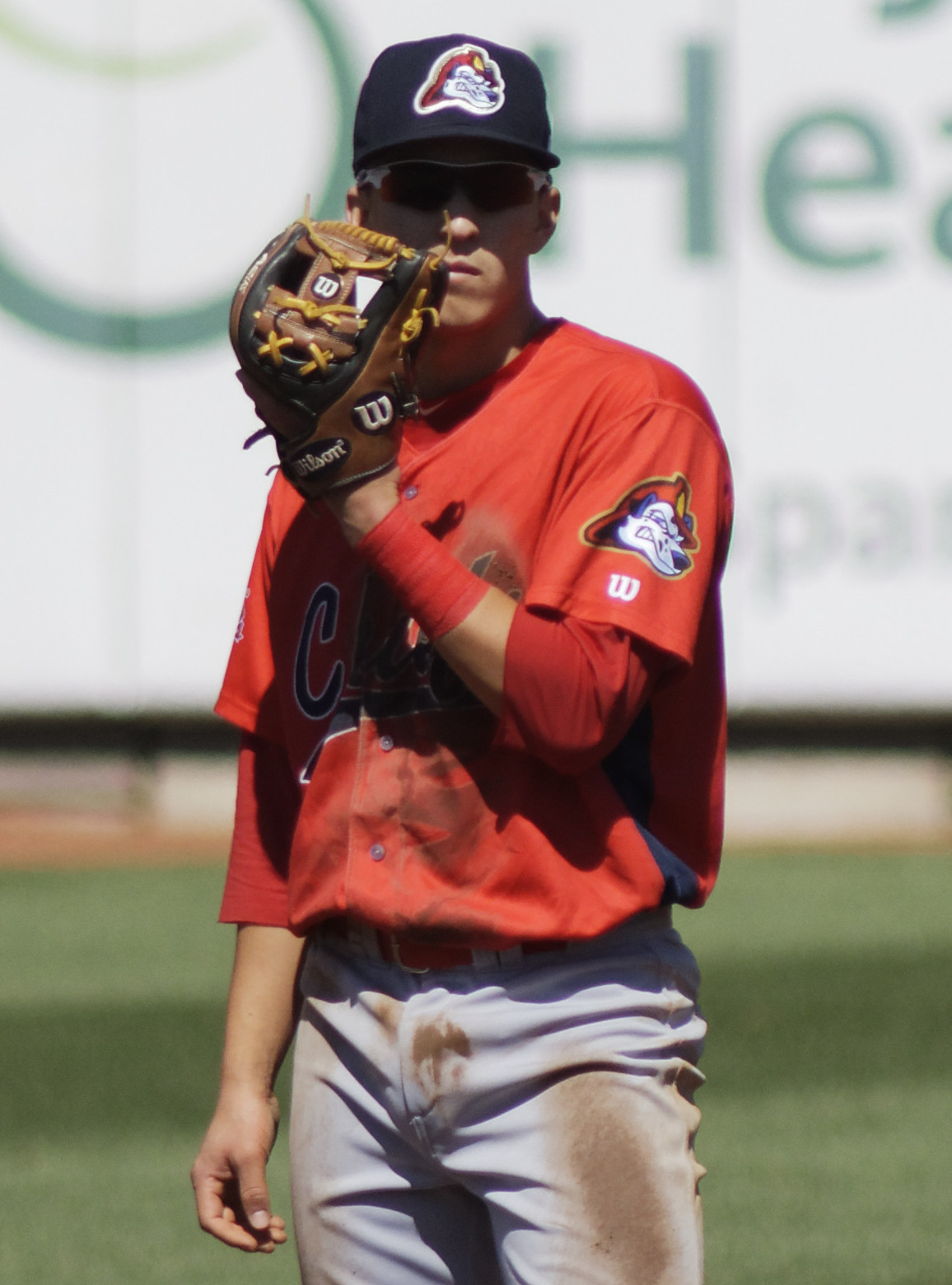
Edman with the Peoria Chiefs in 2017

The St. Louis Cardinals selected Edman in the sixth round of the 2016 Major League Baseball draft. After signing, he was assigned to the State College Spikes, where he spent the whole season, posting a .286 batting average with four home runs, 33 RBIs, and 19 stolen bases in 22 attempts over 66 games. He was named a New York–Penn League All-Star. In 2017, he played for the Peoria Chiefs, Palm Beach Cardinals, and Springfield Cardinals, batting a combined .261 with five home runs and 55 RBIs in 119 games between the three clubs.

Edman began the 2018 season with Springfield, where he was named a Texas League All-Star. He reached base in 32 straight games, breaking Springfield's all-time record. He was promoted to the Memphis Redbirds at the end of the season, helping them win the Pacific Coast League (PCL) title and was named a co-MVP of the PCL playoffs, along with teammate Randy Arozarena. In 126 games between Springfield and Memphis, Edman had a .301 batting average (BA), .354 on base percentage (OBP) and .402 slugging percentage (SLG) with seven home runs, 41 RBIs, and 30 stolen bases in 35 attempts. After the season, the Cardinals assigned Edman to the Surprise Saguaros of the Arizona Fall League (AFL).

=== St. Louis Cardinals ===
==== 2019 ====
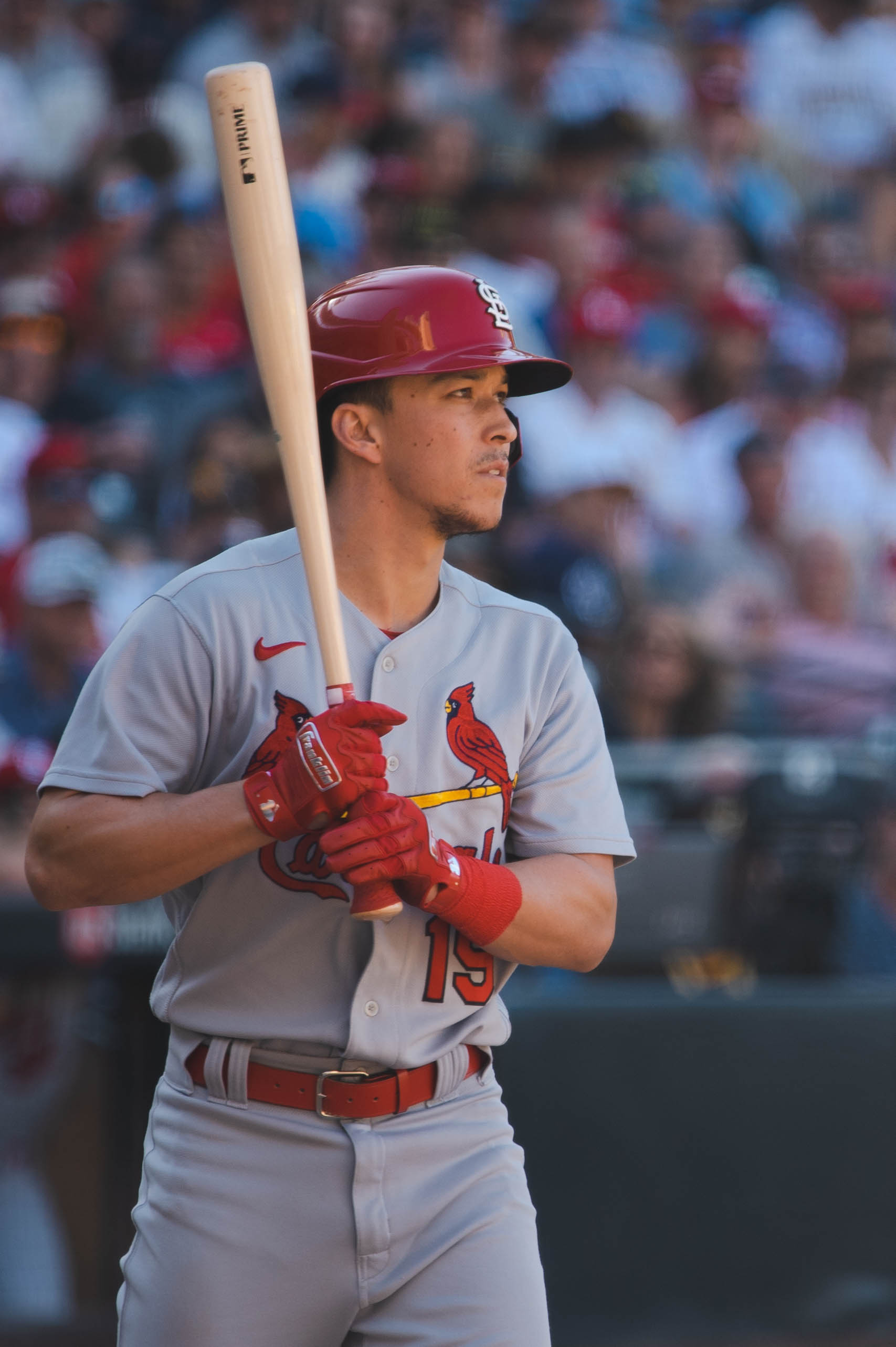
Edman with the Cardinals in 2022

Edman began the 2019 season back with Memphis, where he had a BA/OBP/SLG slash line of .305/.356/.513 with seven home runs, 29 RBIs, and nine stolen bases over 49 games. On June 8, his contract was selected and he was called up to the major leagues for the first time. He made his debut that night as a pinch hitter versus the Chicago Cubs at Wrigley Field. Edman recorded his first MLB hit on June 14 against Steven Matz of the New York Mets and his first career home run on June 20 against Tayron Guerrero of the Miami Marlins. On July 18, he hit his first career grand slam off of Robert Stephenson of the Cincinnati Reds. Over 92 regular-season games with St. Louis in 2019, Edman slashed .304/.350/.500 with 11 home runs, 36 RBIs, and 15 stolen bases in 16 attempts. He had the fastest sprint speed of all major league third basemen at 29.4 feet/second. In the post-season, he had six hits, including three doubles, in 19 at-bats in the National League Division Series (NLDS) but was hitless in 14 at-bats in the National League Championship Series (NLCS) against the Washington Nationals.

==== 2020 ====
Edman was named the starting third baseman for the Cardinals in the pandemic shortened 2020 season. In 227 plate appearances, he batted .250/.317/.368 with five home runs and 26 RBIs. He had three hits in 14 at-bats during the Wild Card Series.

==== 2021 ====
In 2021, Edman was named the club's starting second baseman after the departure of Kolten Wong and the acquisition of Nolan Arenado. He earned the NL Player of the Week Award after batting .426 with two home runs from August 23 through August 29. Edman appeared in 159 games for the 2021 season, slashing .262/.308/.387 with 11 home runs, 56 RBIs, 41 doubles, and thirty stolen bases over 691 plate appearances. His 41 doubles tied with Ozzie Albies for second in the National League, trailing Bryce Harper's 42. Edman won the Gold Glove Award at second base, one of five Cardinals to win the award that year, an MLB record. In the Wild Card Game against the Los Angeles Dodgers, he had three hits in five at-bats with two stolen bases, but the Cardinals lost on a walk-off home run.

==== 2022 ====
Edman returned as the Cardinals' starting second baseman to open the 2022 season. In mid-May, after the demotion of starting shortstop Paul DeJong and the call-up of second base prospect Nolan Gorman, Edman moved to shortstop. On June 11, Edman hit his first career walk-off home run, a two-run home run that secured a 5–4 victory versus the Cincinnati Reds. He finished the season slashing .265/.324/.400 with 13 home runs, 57 RBIs, 31 doubles, and 32 stolen bases over 630 plate appearances in 153 games. He had one hit in six at-bats in the Wild Card Series against the Philadelphia Phillies, which the Cardinals lost in two games.

==== 2023 ====
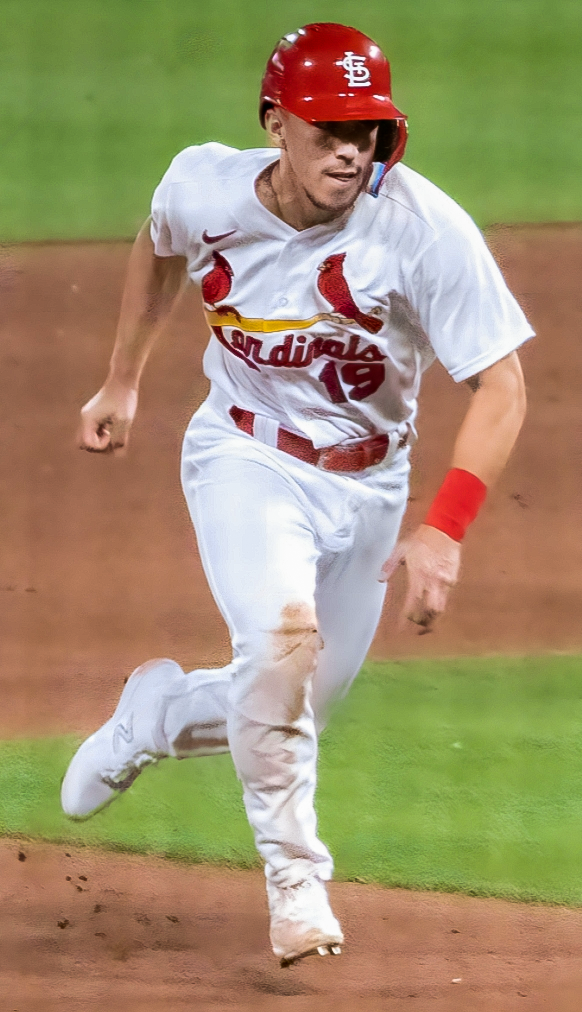
Edman in 2023

On January 13, 2023, Edman agreed to a one-year, $4.2 million contract with the Cardinals, avoiding salary arbitration. He appeared in 153 games (mainly at shortstop, second base, and center field) and batted .265 with 13 home runs, 57 RBI, and 32 stolen bases.

==== 2024 ====
Edman and the Cardinals agreed to a two-year deal worth $16.5 million on January 22, 2024, again avoiding salary arbitration. However, he did not play for the Cardinals in 2024: after undergoing wrist surgery in the offseason, he was shut down during spring training due to renewed wrist discomfort. On May 6, Edman was transferred to the 60-day injured list.

=== Los Angeles Dodgers ===
==== 2024 ====
On July 29, 2024, the Cardinals traded Edman to his home state Los Angeles Dodgers in a three-team deal that also sent Michael Kopech and Oliver Gonzalez to the Dodgers, Erick Fedde and Tommy Pham to St. Louis, and Miguel Vargas, Alexander Albertus, and Jeral Pérez to the Chicago White Sox. Edman made his season debut with the Dodgers on August 19. He played in 37 games for the Dodgers, splitting time between shortstop and center field, with a .237 average, six homers and 20 RBI. He was 4-for-17 in the NLDS.

In the NLCS, Edman took home the series MVP honors after helping lead the Dodgers to the World Series by defeating the New York Mets in six games, hitting a two-run home run in the Game 6 clincher. Edman hit .407 in the series and tied the Dodgers club record by notching 11 RBI in a postseason series. He subsequently won his first World Series championship when the Dodgers beat the New York Yankees in five games; in the series, he batted .294 (5-for-17) with one home run and one RBI.

On November 29, 2024, Edman signed a five-year, $74 million contract extension with the Dodgers, which included a sixth-year team option.

==== 2025 ====
Edman played second base as the Dodgers opened the season in Japan for the MLB Tokyo Series. He hit the first home run of the 2025 season, a solo home run off Justin Steele of the Chicago Cubs in the second game of the season. After injuring his ankle on the basepaths on April 29, Edman went on the injured list, returning in mid-May. Another baserunning ankle injury landed him back on the injured list in August, keeping him away from the team for a month. Overall, he played in 97 games for the Dodgers (66 at second, 25 in center field and 13 at third base) and had a .225 batting average (the lowest of his career), while hitting 13 home runs and driving in 49 RBI.

Edman played in one game during the Wild Card Series, while still dealing with his ankle injury, and had one hit (a home run) in three at-bats. In the 2025 NLDS, he had four hits (including another home run) in 17 at-bats and in the 2025 NLCS he had five hits in 15 at-bats. In 28 at-bats in the 2025 World Series, he had four hits (two doubles) as the Dodgers won their second straight title, in seven games.

On November 11, 2025, it was announced that Edman would require surgery to repair an ankle injury that had hampered him during the 2025 season.

==== 2026 ====
Edman began the 2026 season on the 60-day injured list as he recovered from his off-season surgery, and was activated on June 16. He played in 84 games for the Dodgers, batting .247 with eight home runs and 42 RBI.

== International career ==
In 2023, Edman was called to the South Korea national baseball team. He played second base during the 2023 World Baseball Classic. In 11 trips to the plate in the first three games, he had 2 hits and 1 walk. The team did not progress past pool play. He was unable to play in the 2026 World Baseball Classic due to recovering from surgery.

== Personal life ==
Edman is the son of Maureen Kwak/Kwak Kyung-ah and John Edman Jr. He is of Korean heritage from his mother's side and is of European heritage from his father's side. His father John played four years of college baseball at Williams College in Massachusetts, and is a teacher and varsity baseball coach at La Jolla Country Day School, Edman's alma mater. His mother Maureen was born in South Korea and moved to the United States as a child. Edman's older brother, John, works in research and development for the Minnesota Twins. His younger sister, Elise, played volleyball at Davidson College and worked as a systems engineer for the Cardinals.

On November 23, 2019, Edman married his wife, Kristen. The couple had originally planned the wedding for October 5 but were forced to reschedule due to the Cardinals' participation in the 2019 National League Division Series. The couple has two children.

Edman is a Christian, and has said, "Obviously, as a baseball player, your goal is to win the World Series. But I think for me, my goal is to be able to use the platform that I have to impact as many people as I can. It's important for me as a Christian to be able to spread the word of God as much as I can."
