= Miguel Vargas (baseball) =

Cuban baseball player (born 1999)

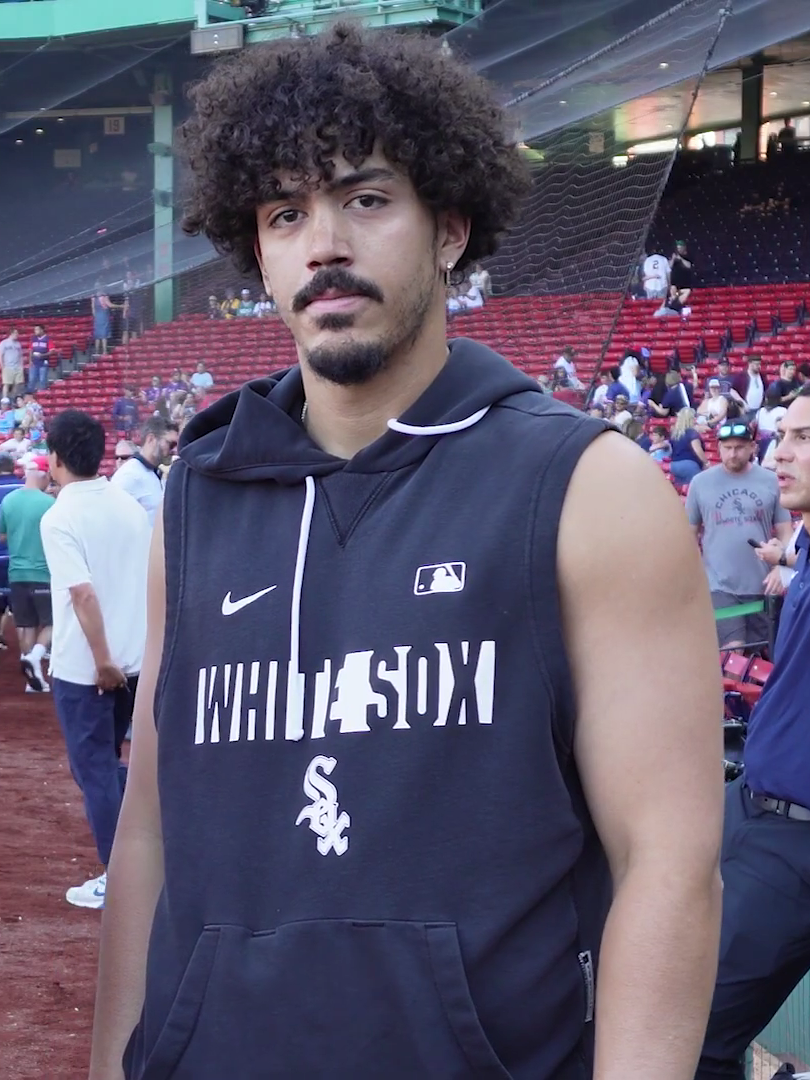
- Vargas with the White Sox in 2026

Chicago White Sox – No. 20
- Third baseman / First baseman
- Born: November 17, 1999 (age 26); Havana, Cuba
- Bats: Right Throws: Right

MLB debut
- August 3, 2022, for the Los Angeles Dodgers

MLB statistics (through 2026 season)
- Batting average: .221
- Home runs: 62
- Runs batted in: 209
- Stats at Baseball Reference

Teams
- Los Angeles Dodgers (2022–2024); Chicago White Sox (2024–present)

Career highlights and awards
- All-Star (2026)

Miguel Antonio Vargas (born November 17, 1999) is a Cuban-born professional baseball third baseman and first baseman for the Chicago White Sox of Major League Baseball (MLB). He has previously played in MLB for the Los Angeles Dodgers.

A Cuban national and the son of former baseball player Lázaro Vargas, he defected and ultimately signed with the Dodgers as an international free agent in 2017. After playing several seasons in the minor leagues and receiving attention as one of the Dodgers' top prospects, he made his MLB debut in 2022.

In parts of three seasons with the Dodgers, Vargas did not find consistent playing time and moved back and forth between the major league roster and minors. In 2024, the Dodgers traded Vargas to the Chicago White Sox as part of a three-team trade. Vargas was named to his first All-Star game in 2026.

== Career ==
=== Los Angeles Dodgers ===
Vargas signed with the Los Angeles Dodgers as an international free agent in September 2017. He spent his first professional season in 2018 with the Arizona League Dodgers, Ogden Raptors and Great Lakes Loons.

Vargas played 2019 with Great Lakes and Rancho Cucamonga Quakes. He did not play in a game in 2020 due to the cancellation of the minor league season because of the COVID-19 pandemic. Vargas started 2021 with Great Lakes before being promoted to the Tulsa Drillers. Between the two teams, he appeared in 120 games and batted .319 with 23 home runs and 76 RBIs. The Dodgers honored Vargas by awarding him the organizations Branch Rickey Minor League Player of the Year Award. He was selected as a post-season Double-A Central all-star. The organization promoted Vargas to the Triple-A Oklahoma City Dodgers to begin the 2022 season and he received an invitation to the 2022 All-Star Futures Game. Vargas played in 113 games for Oklahoma City, batting .304 with 17 homers and 72 RBIs.

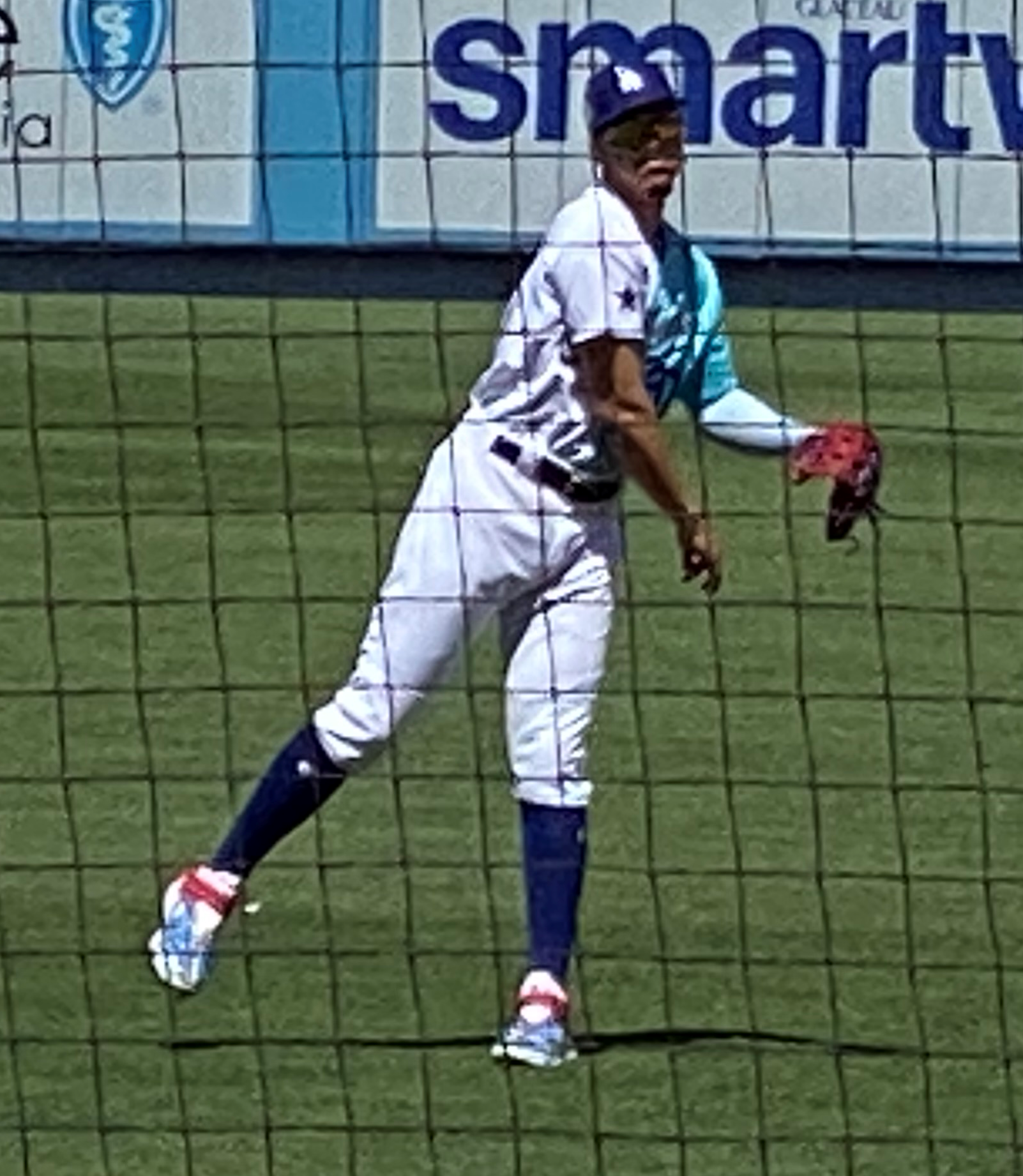
Vargas at the 2022 All-Star Futures Game

The Dodgers promoted Vargas to the major leagues for the first time on August 2, 2022. He made his first appearance the following day, against the San Francisco Giants as the starting designated hitter. In his first at-bat, Vargas hit a ground-rule double off Giants' starter Alex Cobb. On September 24, 2022, he hit his first MLB home run off Jordan Montgomery of the St. Louis Cardinals. In 18 games with the Dodgers, Vargas hit .170 with eight RBIs while playing first base and left field as well as designated hitter.

Vargas served as the Dodgers' Opening Day second baseman for the 2023 season. In that role, he played 81 games through the All-Star break, but hit only .195 with seven home runs and 32 RBIs. The Dodgers optioned Vargas to the minors on July 9 and he remained there for the rest of the season. Back with Oklahoma City, he played 60 games with a .288 batting average, 10 home runs and 43 RBIs, helping the team win the Pacific Coast League championship.

Vargas returned to Oklahoma City to begin the 2024 season and rejoined the major league roster on May 17. In Los Angeles, he played 30 games and batted .239 with three home runs and nine RBIs while playing left field.

=== Chicago White Sox ===
On July 29, 2024, the Dodgers traded Vargas, Alexander Albertus, Jeral Pérez, and a player to be named later (PTBNL) to the Chicago White Sox for Michael Kopech as part of a three-team trade that also included the St. Louis Cardinals' Tommy Edman. He made his team debut on July 30, going 0-for-4 against the Kansas City Royals. He hit his first home run with the team on August 2 against the Minnesota Twins. He ended the 2024 season with a .150 with 5 HRs, 16 RBI, and three stolen bases.

Vargas was named the American League Player of the Week for the eighth week of the season after going 10-for-24 (.417) with 4 home runs and nine RBI in that period. Vargas earned his first career honor as American League Player of the Week, marking the first honor for Chicago since Luis Robert Jr. won on June 26, 2023, and the first honor for a White Sox infielder since José Abreu won on May 31, 2021.

== Personal life ==
His father, Lázaro Vargas, played baseball for the Cuban national team.
