= 2022 National League Championship Series =

Team (Wins)	Managers	Season
Philadelphia Phillies (4)	Rob Thomson	87–75 (.537), GB: 14
San Diego Padres (1)	Bob Melvin	89–73 (.549), GB: 22
- Dates: October 18–23
- MVP: Bryce Harper (Philadelphia)
- Umpires: Lance Barrett, Ted Barrett (crew chief), Doug Eddings, Adam Hamari, Brian Knight, Todd Tichenor, Quinn Wolcott

Broadcast
- Television: FS1 (Games 1–3 and 5); Fox (Games 2, 4)
- TV announcers: Joe Davis, John Smoltz, Ken Rosenthal, and Tom Verducci
- Radio: ESPN
- Radio announcers: Jon Sciambi and Doug Glanville
- NLDS: Philadelphia Phillies over Atlanta Braves (3–1); San Diego Padres over Los Angeles Dodgers (3–1)

The 2022 National League Championship Series (NLCS) was the best-of-seven playoff in Major League Baseball's 2022 postseason between the fifth-seeded San Diego Padres and the sixth-seeded Philadelphia Phillies for the National League (NL) pennant and the right to play in the 2022 World Series.

The series began on October 18 and ended on October 23. Fox and FS1 televised the games in the U.S. This was the first time in Major League history that two Wild Card teams faced each other in the League Championship Series (prior to 2022, only one Wild Card team per league could advance to the Division Series; as such, two Wild Card teams couldn't face each other in the LCS in a full season until 2022). This was also the first time in Major League history that playoff rounds overlapped, as the 2022 ALDS had a game the same day the NLCS began.

The Phillies would go on to lose in the 2022 World Series to the Houston Astros in six games.

== Background ==
The San Diego Padres qualified for the postseason as the fifth seed wild card entrant. In the Wild Card Series, they defeated the New York Mets in three games. In the Division Series, they defeated the National League West division winner Los Angeles Dodgers, who held the best regular season record of 111–51 at the time of the postseason, in four games. The Padres made it to the National League Championship Series for the first time since 1998.

The Philadelphia Phillies qualified for the playoffs as the sixth seed wild card entrant, and the last remaining team, in both the season and in MLB history, to earn a wild card berth. In the Wild Card Series, they swept the St. Louis Cardinals, who were the National League Central division winner and seeded third in the National League. In the Division Series, they defeated the defending World Series champion and National League East division winner Atlanta Braves in four games. The Phillies made it to the National League Championship Series for the first time since 2010.

This was the first postseason meeting between the Padres and the Phillies. Philadelphia won four of the seven regular season games against San Diego. Brothers Aaron Nola, of the Phillies, and Austin Nola, of the Padres, became the first pair of brothers to face each other as pitcher and batter in the postseason.

== Summary ==
Philadelphia won the series, 4–1.

Game	Date	Score	Location	Time	Attendance
1	October 18	Philadelphia Phillies – 2, San Diego Padres – 0	Petco Park	2:43	44,826
2	October 19	Philadelphia Phillies – 5, San Diego Padres – 8	Petco Park	3:57	44,607
3	October 21	San Diego Padres – 2, Philadelphia Phillies – 4	Citizens Bank Park	3:23	45,279
4	October 22	San Diego Padres – 6, Philadelphia Phillies – 10	Citizens Bank Park	3:29	45,467
5	October 23	San Diego Padres – 3, Philadelphia Phillies – 4	Citizens Bank Park	3:32	45,485

== Game summaries ==
=== Game 1 ===
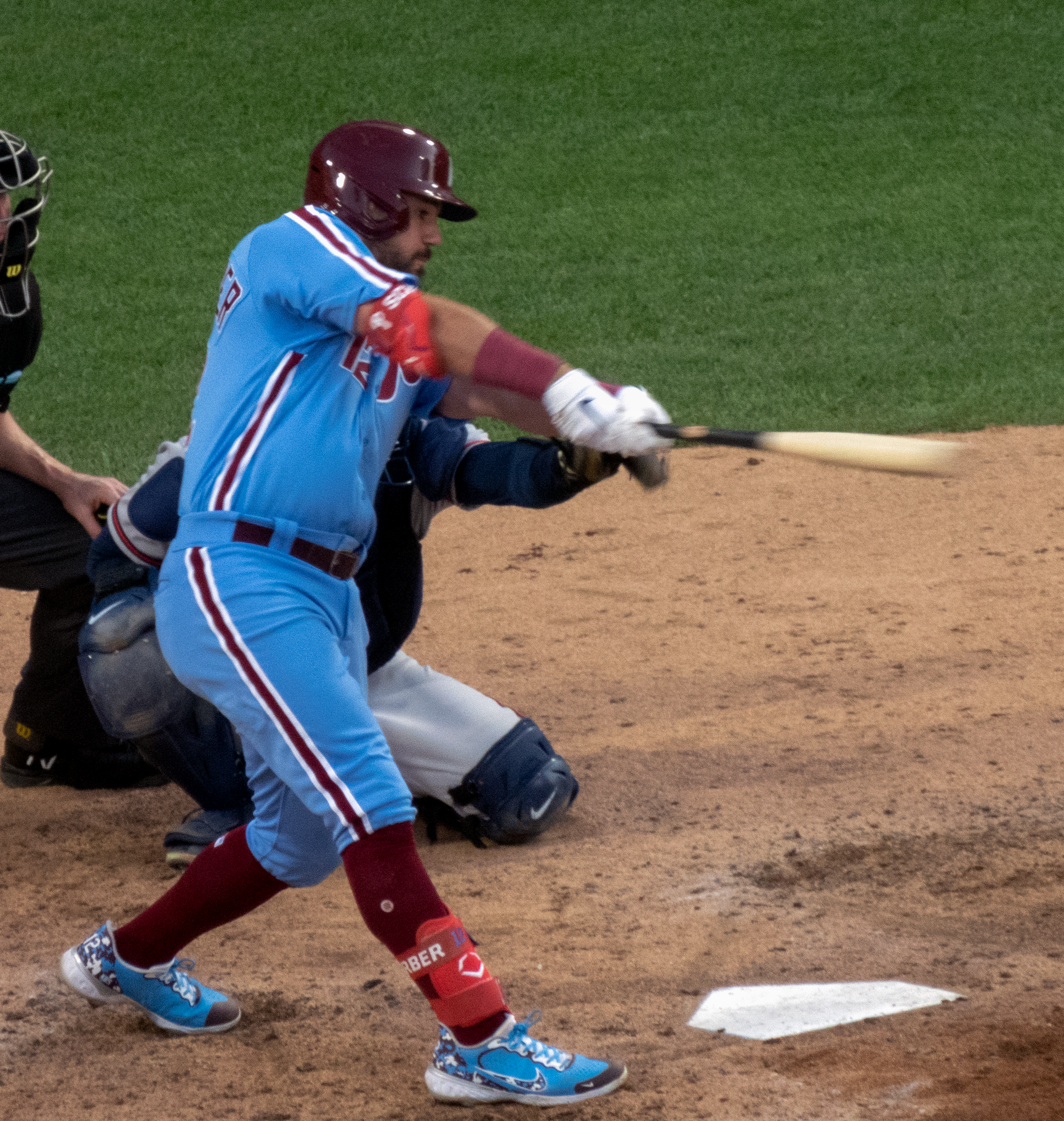
Kyle Schwarber hit a towering second-deck home run in Game 1.

October 18, 2022 5:03 pm (PDT) at Petco Park in San Diego, California 78 °F (26 °C), sunny
Team	1	2	3	4	5	6	7	8	9	R	H	E
Philadelphia	0	0	0	1	0	1	0	0	0	2	3	1
San Diego	0	0	0	0	0	0	0	0	0	0	1	0
WP: Zack Wheeler (1–0) LP: Yu Darvish (0–1) Sv: José Alvarado (1); Home runs: PHI: Bryce Harper (1), Kyle Schwarber (1); SD: None; Attendance: 44,826; Boxscore

Game 1 was a low-scoring pitcher's duel between Philadelphia's Zack Wheeler and San Diego's Yu Darvish. In the top of the first, with Kyle Schwarber at third and two outs, Jake Cronenworth made a diving stop to get Bryce Harper out at first and rob the Phillies of a run. In the fourth, Harper homered off of Darvish for the first run of the series. In the bottom of the inning, Wheeler retired the heart of the Padres' order. In the top of the sixth, Schwarber added on to the Phillies' lead, hitting a towering second-deck home run. Philadelphia's Seranthony Dominguez retired the side in the bottom of the eighth. In the ninth, they missed out on makng a double play because third baseman Alec Bohm missed a throw to second baseman Bryson Stott after a Juan Soto grounder. However, after a Manny Machado flyout, José Alvarado struck out Josh Bell to end the inning and the game. Wheeler struck out eight batters in Game 1, earning the win.

=== Game 2 ===
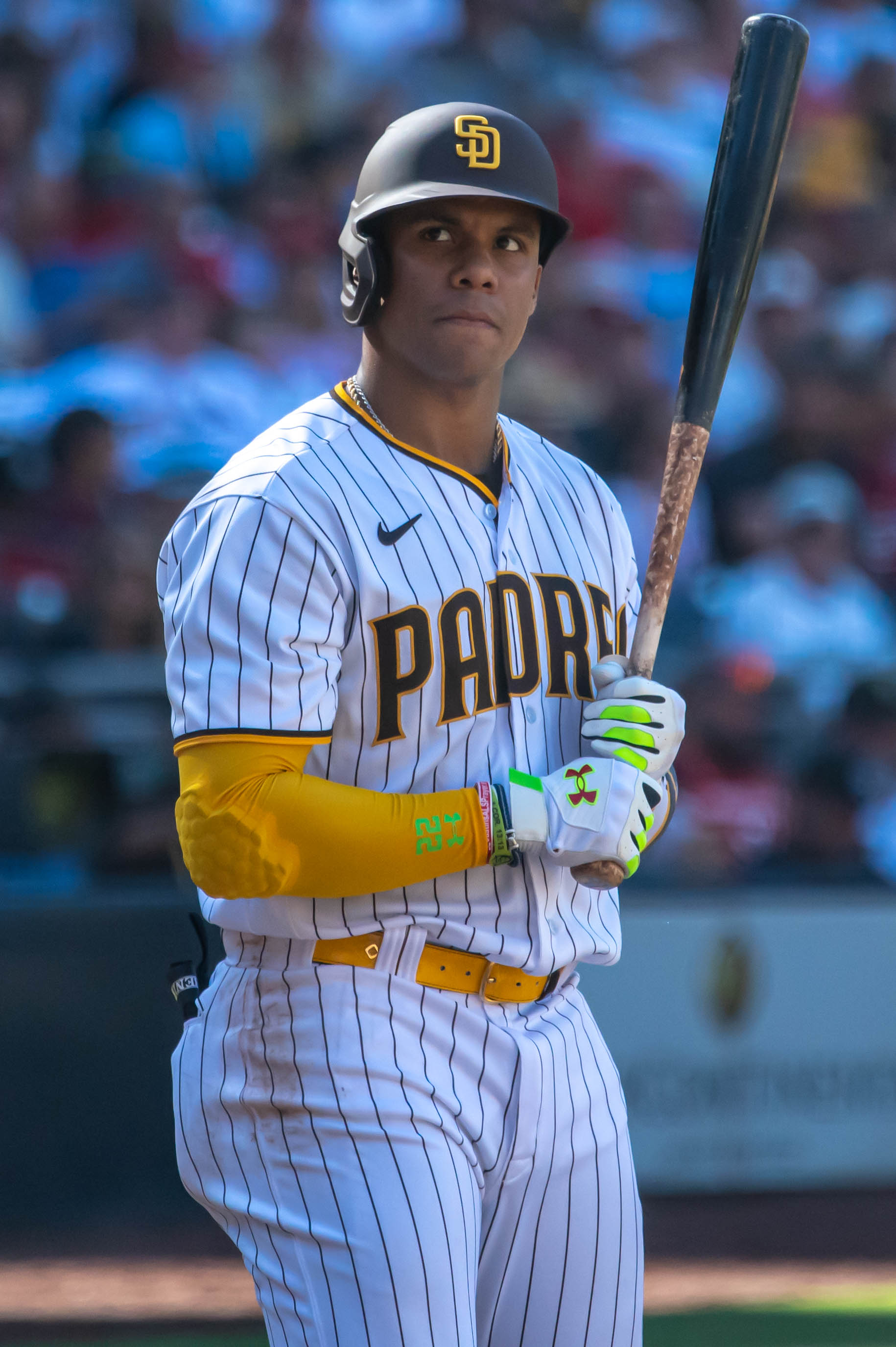
Juan Soto hit a big game-tying double in Game 2.

October 19, 2022 1:35 pm (PDT) at Petco Park in San Diego, California 92 °F (33 °C), sunny
Team	1	2	3	4	5	6	7	8	9	R	H	E
Philadelphia	0	4	0	0	0	0	0	1	0	5	8	0
San Diego	0	2	0	0	5	0	1	0	X	8	12	1
WP: Blake Snell (1–0) LP: Aaron Nola (0–1) Sv: Josh Hader (1); Home runs: PHI: Rhys Hoskins (1); SD: Brandon Drury (1), Josh Bell (1), Manny Machado (1); Attendance: 44,607; Boxscore

Philadelphia jumped on top early in Game 2, scoring four runs off of Blake Snell in the top of the second by way of a bloop single by Alec Bohm that scored Bryce Harper, a Matt Vierling double that was lost in the sun by Juan Soto, an Edmundo Sosa single, and a Kyle Schwarber grounder that was dropped by Brandon Drury, allowing Vierling to score. The Padres answered back in the bottom of the inning with home runs on back-to-back pitches from Brandon Drury and Josh Bell off of Phillies starter Aaron Nola. Nola then faced his brother Austin, who grounded out to third. In the top of the fifth, Austin singled off his brother, scoring Ha-seong Kim. Jurickson Profar then singled to advance Nola to third. The next batter, Juan Soto, doubled to right field, scoring Nola and tying the game at four. Three additional runs would score in the inning, two from a single from Drury, and one from a single from Bell to put the Padres up 7–4. In the seventh inning, Manny Machado homered off Philadelphia's David Robertson, increasing the Padres' lead to four. A first-pitch homer from Rhys Hoskins in the top of the eighth that cut down San Diego's lead to three would be the final run of the game, as Josh Hader earned the save in San Diego's first win in an NLCS game since 1998.

=== Game 3 ===
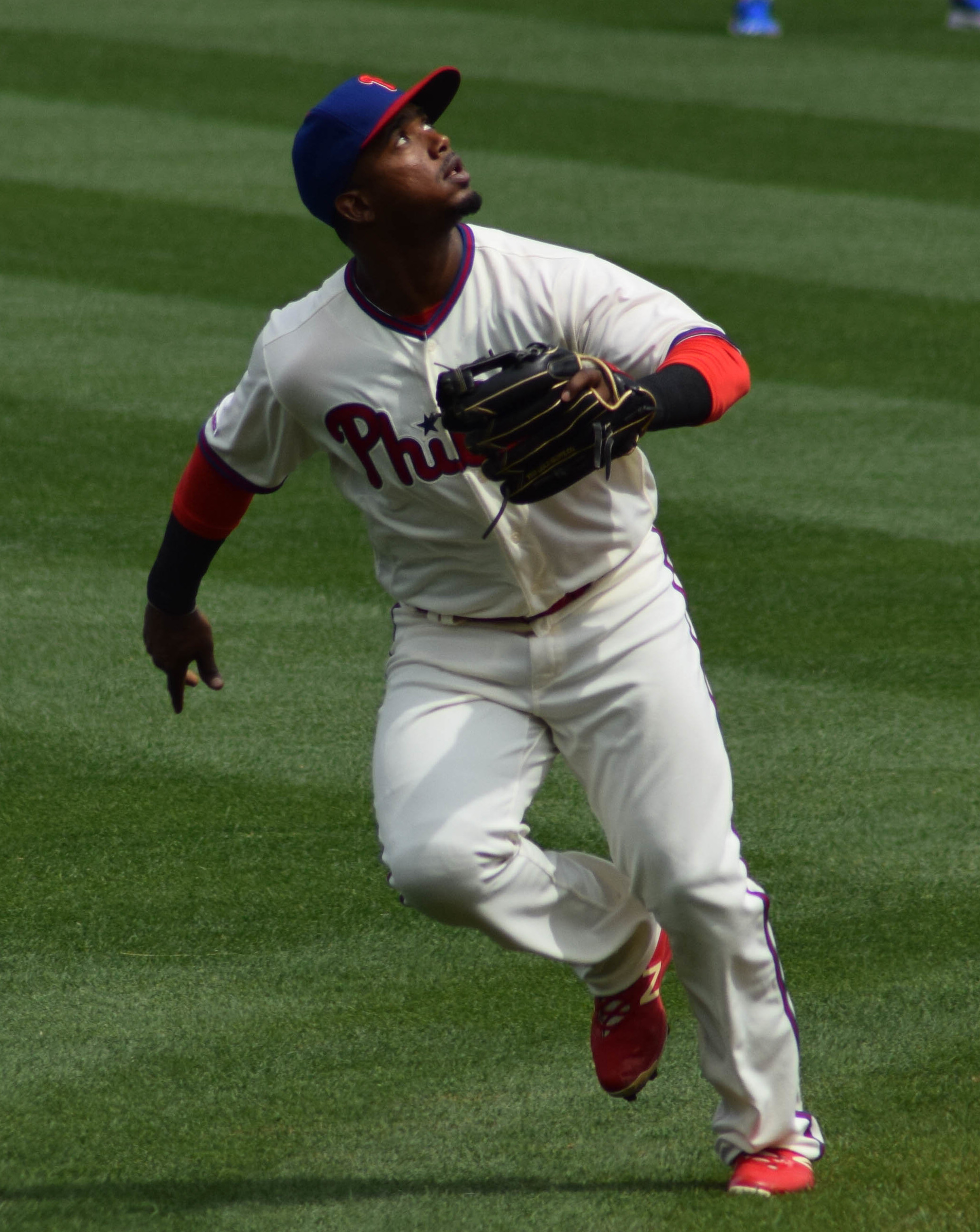
Jean Segura had the go-ahead RBI single in Game 3.

October 21, 2022 7:37 pm (EDT) at Citizens Bank Park in Philadelphia, Pennsylvania 58 °F (14 °C), clear
Team	1	2	3	4	5	6	7	8	9	R	H	E
San Diego	0	0	0	1	1	0	0	0	0	2	7	0
Philadelphia	1	0	0	2	0	1	0	0	X	4	9	2
WP: Ranger Suárez (1–0) LP: Joe Musgrove (0–1) Sv: Seranthony Domínguez (1); Home runs: SD: None; PHI: Kyle Schwarber (2); Attendance: 45,279; Boxscore

Game 3 featured Philadelphia's Ranger Suarez on the mound in their first NLCS home game since 2010. San Diego countered with Joe Musgrove, who gave up a leadoff home run from Kyle Schwarber in the bottom of the first inning. In the top of the fourth inning, with runners at first and third, San Diego's Jake Cronenworth hit a ground ball to shortstop Bryson Stott. Stott threw to second baseman Jean Segura, who dropped the ball, allowing Juan Soto to score and tying the game at one. The Phillies answered in the bottom of the inning with a double from Stott after an Alec Bohm walk. Segura then singled to right-center field, scoring both runners and putting the Phillies up 3–1. In the fifth inning, San Diego's Trent Grisham hit a ground ball along the first base line that was misplayed by Rhys Hoskins for a double. Ha-seong Kim then grounded out to score Grisham from third and cut the Phillies' lead to one. In the sixth inning, Bohm doubled to Soto, who dove for the ball and missed, scoring Nick Castellanos from second to raise the Phillies' lead by one. In the top of the ninth inning, Jurickson Profar was ejected after arguing a check swing call. Seranthony Domínguez earned the save for Philadelphia, his playoff save.

=== Game 4 ===
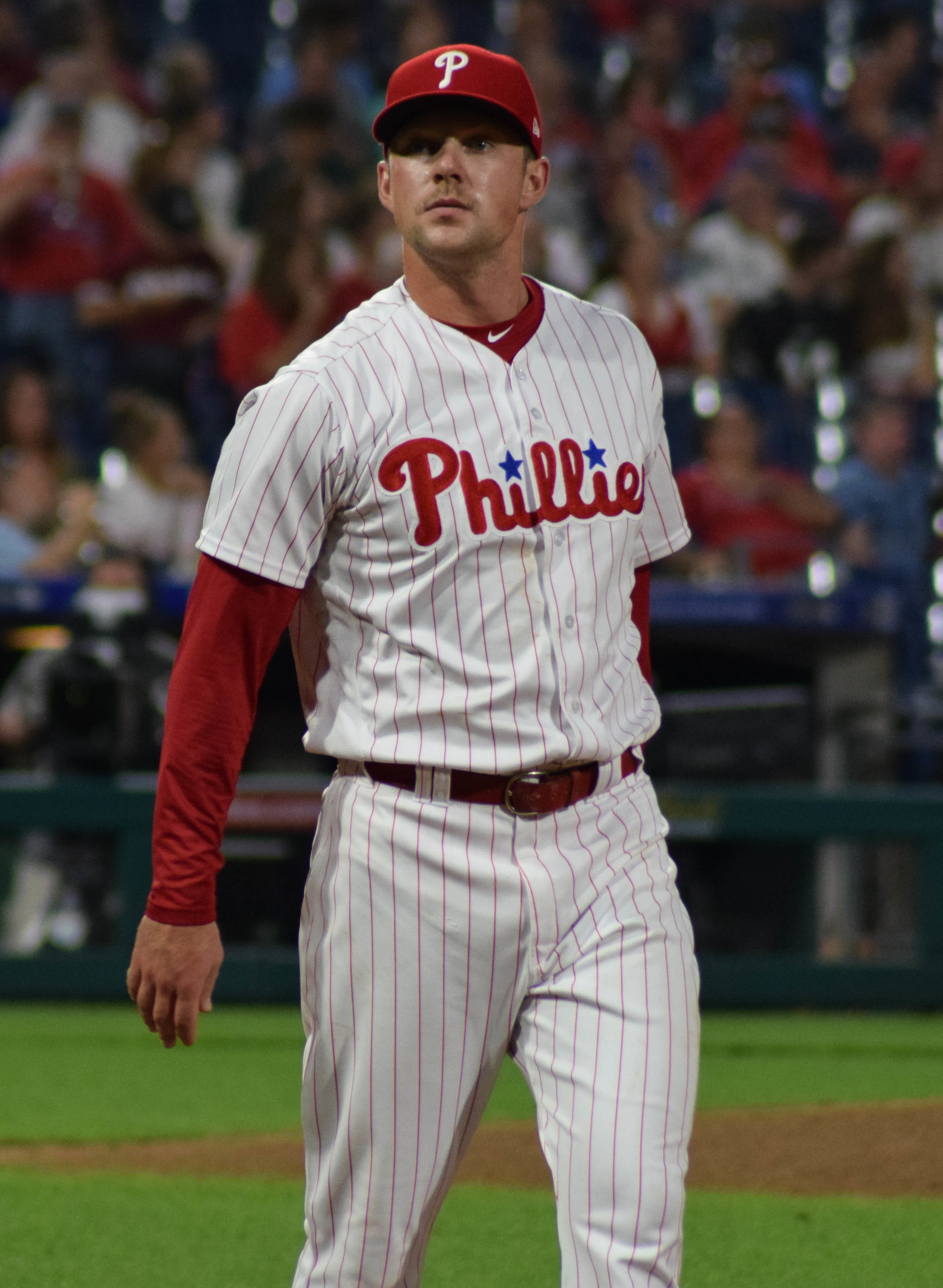
Rhys Hoskins hit two home runs in Game 4.

October 22, 2022 7:45 pm (EDT) at Citizens Bank Park in Philadelphia, Pennsylvania 60 °F (16 °C), mostly cloudy
Team	1	2	3	4	5	6	7	8	9	R	H	E
San Diego	4	0	0	0	2	0	0	0	0	6	8	0
Philadelphia	3	0	0	1	4	1	1	0	X	10	11	0
WP: Brad Hand (1–0) LP: Sean Manaea (0–1); Home runs: SD: Manny Machado (2), Juan Soto (1); PHI: Rhys Hoskins 2 (3), Kyle Schwarber (3), J. T. Realmuto (1); Attendance: 45,467; Boxscore

Three days after the Phillies blew a 4–0 lead in Game 2, the Padres blew a 4–0 lead of their own. In the first inning, Manny Machado hit a solo home run, followed by a two-run double by Brandon Drury that pulled Philadelphia starter Bailey Falter out of the game. His replacement, Connor Brogdon, gave up a single by Ha-seong Kim that scored Drury to widen the Padres' lead to 4–0. In the bottom of the inning, Rhys Hoskins hit a two-run home run for the Phillies to cut the lead in half, followed by a run-scoring double by Bryce Harper to get Philadelphia within one run. This pulled San Diego starter Mike Clevinger out of the game, the first time two opposing starters had been pulled in the first inning of a postseason game since the 1932 World Series. In the bottom of the fourth, Bryson Stott tied the game at four, scoring Nick Castellanos. Stott was tagged out at second base. In the fifth inning, Juan Soto hit a two-run home run to give San Diego a 6–4 edge. The lead was short-lived, however. In the bottom of the inning, Hoskins hit another two-run home run off Sean Manaea to tie the game at six. This was followed by an RBI double by Harper, which gave Philadelphia the lead for the first time in the game. Castellanos hit a single that bounced off second base, scoring Harper to make it 8–6. Kyle Schwarber and J. T. Realmuto added to the scoring with solo home runs in the sixth and seventh innings off Luis Garcia and Steven Wilson, respectively. The 10–6 victory for Philadelphia pulled them within one win of going to the World Series.

=== Game 5 ===
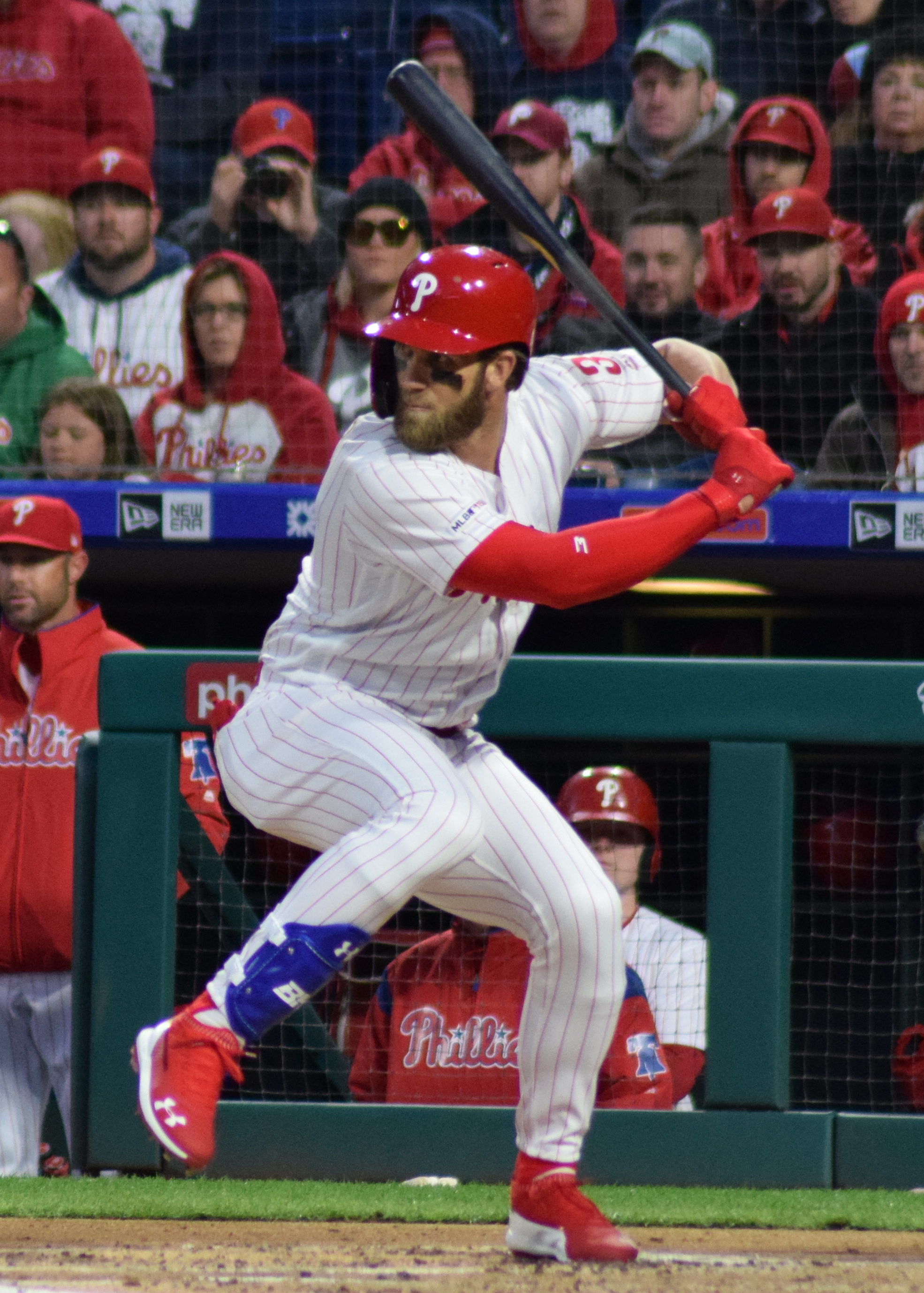
Bryce Harper hit the series-winning home run in Game 5.

October 23, 2022 2:37 pm (EDT) at Citizens Bank Park in Philadelphia, Pennsylvania 63 °F (17 °C), cloudy
Team	1	2	3	4	5	6	7	8	9	R	H	E
San Diego	0	0	0	1	0	0	2	0	0	3	5	0
Philadelphia	0	0	2	0	0	0	0	2	X	4	6	0
WP: José Alvarado (1–0) LP: Robert Suárez (0–1) Sv: Ranger Suárez (1); Home runs: SD: Juan Soto (2); PHI: Rhys Hoskins (4), Bryce Harper (2); Attendance: 45,485; Boxscore

Game 5 was a pitching rematch of Game 1, with Zack Wheeler on the mound for the Phillies and Yu Darvish for the Padres. In the bottom of the third with two outs, Darvish walked Kyle Schwarber. The next batter, Rhys Hoskins, followed up on his performance in Game 4 and hit a two-run home run, his third in 24 hours. The Padres prevented additional scoring after a J. T. Realmuto single when Bryce Harper flew out to end the inning. Juan Soto struck back for the Padres in the top of the fourth with a solo home run. Wheeler was chased from the game after giving up a single to Jake Cronenworth in the top of the seventh. His replacement, Seranthony Domínguez, gave up a double to Josh Bell that scored Cronenworth. Bell's pinch runner, José Azócar, advanced to third on a wild pitch. With two outs and two strikes on the batter, Trent Grisham, Domínguez threw another pitch in the dirt to score Azócar and give San Diego the lead. Grisham then flew out to end the top of the inning. In the top of the seventh, Bryson Stott doubled, removing Darvish from the game. He was replaced with Robert Suárez. After getting Jean Segura to fly out and striking out Brandon Marsh, Suárez intentionally walked Schwarber. With two outs, Hoskins flew out to end the inning. After Domínguez's disappointing performance in the seventh inning, he was replaced with José Alvarado, who walked Soto after giving up a single to Jurickson Profar. Alvarado got out of the jam by getting Manny Machado to fly out and Cronenworth to ground out.

In the bottom of the eighth, with Philadelphia still trailing by a run, Realmuto singled to left field. Harper then hit a two-run home run to left field, giving the Phillies a one-run lead. Joe Davis, who was the TV play-by-play broadcaster on FS1, described the moment as "the swing of his [Harper's] life." Scott Franzke, calling the game on Phillies radio, termed the home fans' delirious reaction "bedlam at the Bank." After Suárez retired the next two Phillies, David Robertson came in to close for Philadelphia, and after walking Brandon Drury and Ha-seong Kim with one out, he was taken out of the game. Ranger Suárez, who started in Game 3, was his replacement. Grisham, the next batter, bunted to advance the runners to second and third but was put out at first base. Austin Nola then flew out to Nick Castellanos, sending the Phillies to the World Series for the first time since 2009.

After the game, Harper was named the NLCS MVP, having had a .400 batting average, five runs batted in, and two home runs, including the pennant-winning two-run homer in Game 5.

This turned out to be the last postseason game for the Padres under owner Peter Seidler, who died at the age of 63 shortly after the 2023 season. Seidler was credited for elevating the Padres to national prominence after years in the doldrums, with financial commitments in the hundreds of millions, in hopes of bringing San Diego its first sports championship since 1963.

=== Composite line score ===
2022 NLCS (4–1): Philadelphia Phillies beat San Diego Padres

Team	1	2	3	4	5	6	7	8	9	R	H	E
Philadelphia Phillies	4	4	2	4	4	3	1	3	0	25	37	3
San Diego Padres	4	2	0	2	8	0	3	0	0	19	33	1
Total attendance: 225,664 Average attendance: 45,133

== See also ==
- 2022 American League Championship Series
- List of nicknamed MLB games and plays
