= 2022 National League Division Series =

American baseball games

Teams
Team (Wins)		Manager	Season
San Diego Padres (3)		Bob Melvin	89–73 (.549), GB: 22
Los Angeles Dodgers (1)		Dave Roberts	111–51 (.685), GA: 22
- Dates: October 11–15
- Television: FS1
- TV announcers: Adam Amin, A. J. Pierzynski, and Tom Verducci
- Radio: ESPN
- Radio announcers: Jon Sciambi and Doug Glanville
- Umpires: Lance Barksdale, Scott Barry, Mark Carlson (crew chief), Tripp Gibson, Chris Segal, John Tumpane

Teams
Team (Wins)		Manager	Season
Philadelphia Phillies (3)		Rob Thomson	87–75 (.537), GB: 14
Atlanta Braves (1)		Brian Snitker	101–61 (.623), GA: 0
- Dates: October 11–15
- Television: Fox (Games 1–2); FS1 (Games 3–4)
- TV announcers: Joe Davis, John Smoltz, and Ken Rosenthal
- Radio: ESPN
- Radio announcers: Karl Ravech and Tim Kurkjian
- Umpires: Ryan Blakney, Chad Fairchild, Nic Lentz, Bill Miller (crew chief), David Rackley, Stu Scheurwater
- NLWC: San Diego Padres over New York Mets (2–1); Philadelphia Phillies over St. Louis Cardinals (2–0)

The 2022 National League Division Series (NLDS) were the two best-of-five playoff series in Major League Baseball's (MLB) 2022 postseason to determine the participating teams of the 2022 National League Championship Series (NLCS). These matchups were:

- (1) Los Angeles Dodgers (NL West champions) vs. (5) San Diego Padres (Wild Card Series winner): Padres won the series, 3–1.
- (2) Atlanta Braves (NL East champions) vs. (6) Philadelphia Phillies (Wild Card Series winner): Phillies won the series, 3–1.

The team with the better regular season record (higher seed) of each series hosted Games 1, 2, and (if necessary) 5, while the lower seeded team hosted Game 3 and (if necessary) 4.

The Phillies would go on to defeat the Padres in five games in the NLCS before falling to the American League champion Houston Astros in six games in the World Series.

Both top seeds in the National League lost in this round for the third time in four years. (Note: 2019: (1) Los Angeles lost to (4) Washington & (2) Atlanta lost to (3) St. Louis, 2021: (1) San Francisco lost to (4) Los Angeles & (2) Milwaukee lost to (3) Atlanta.)

== Background ==
The top two division winners (first two seeds) are determined by regular season winning percentages. The final two teams are the winners of the National League Wild Card Series, played between the league's third to sixth-seeded teams.

The Los Angeles Dodgers (111–51) became the first team to clinch a playoff berth on September 13, their tenth straight postseason appearance, which is the third-longest streak in MLB history. They then clinched the National League West on September 14, a first-round bye from the National League Wild Card Series on September 19, the 1 seed in the National League on September 25, and the best record on September 30, earning them home-field advantage throughout the entire playoffs. They played against the San Diego Padres (89–73), who clinched their first division series appearance since 2020 and just their second since 2006 by defeating the New York Mets in three games in the Wild Card Series. The Dodgers won the season series against the Padres 14–5 during the regular season.

The Atlanta Braves (101–61) clinched their fifth straight postseason appearance on September 21 and clinched the National League East and first-round bye as the 2 seed on October 4, the second-to-last day of the season. The Braves had trailed the New York Mets for virtually the whole season, but they eventually overtook them on the last weekend of the season via a three-game sweep at Truist Park, winning the season series 10–9. They played against the Philadelphia Phillies (87–75), who clinched their first division series berth and appearance since 2011 by defeating the St. Louis Cardinals in a two-game sweep in the Wild Card Series. (Note: The Cardinals clinched the National League Central division championship for the 2022 regular season. However, they were locked into the third seed as the worst division winner in terms of record and hosted the sixth-seed wild card entrant Phillies in the Wild Card Series since the 2022 postseason was expanded to six teams per league with the lowest-seeded division winner hosting the sixth seed in the first playoff round.) Atlanta went 11–8 during the season series against Philadelphia.

== Matchups ==
=== Los Angeles Dodgers vs. San Diego Padres ===
San Diego won the series, 3–1.

Game	Date	Score	Location	Time	Attendance
1	October 11	San Diego Padres – 3, Los Angeles Dodgers – 5	Dodger Stadium	3:21	52,407
2	October 12	San Diego Padres – 5, Los Angeles Dodgers – 3	Dodger Stadium	3:34	53,122
3	October 14	Los Angeles Dodgers – 1, San Diego Padres – 2	Petco Park	3:44	45,137
4	October 15	Los Angeles Dodgers – 3, San Diego Padres – 5	Petco Park	3:46 (:31 delay)	45,139

=== Atlanta Braves vs. Philadelphia Phillies ===
Philadelphia won the series, 3–1.

Game	Date	Score	Location	Time	Attendance
1	October 11	Philadelphia Phillies – 7, Atlanta Braves – 6	Truist Park	3:48	42,641
2	October 12	Philadelphia Phillies – 0, Atlanta Braves – 3	Truist Park	2:48 (2:55 delay)	42,735
3	October 14	Atlanta Braves – 1, Philadelphia Phillies – 9	Citizens Bank Park	3:16	45,538
4	October 15	Atlanta Braves – 3, Philadelphia Phillies – 8	Citizens Bank Park	3:18	45,660

== Los Angeles vs. San Diego ==
This was the second postseason meeting between Los Angeles and San Diego, following their 2020 National League Division Series match-up, which was won by Los Angeles in a three-game sweep. During the regular season, the Dodgers finished in first place in the National League West, while the Padres finished 22 games back in second place. This is a continuation of the Dodgers–Padres rivalry, which has heated up in recent years.

=== Game 1 ===
October 11, 2022 6:37 pm (PDT) at Dodger Stadium in Los Angeles, California 68 °F (20 °C), Mostly Cloudy; rain by the start of the 9th inning
Team	1	2	3	4	5	6	7	8	9	R	H	E
San Diego	0	0	0	0	3	0	0	0	0	3	7	1
Los Angeles	2	0	3	0	0	0	0	0	X	5	6	0
WP: Julio Urías (1–0) LP: Mike Clevinger (0–1) Sv: Chris Martin (1); Home runs: SD: Wil Myers (1); LAD: Trea Turner (1); Attendance: 52,407; Boxscore

Julio Urías made his first career postseason Game 1 start for the Dodgers against Mike Clevinger of the Padres. Trea Turner homered in the first to give the Dodgers an early lead, which they added to quickly, scoring five runs off Clevinger in 2 2/3 innings. The Padres came back to score three runs in the fifth inning to tighten the game, including a Wil Myers home run. It remained scoreless the rest of the way and the Dodgers won the first game, 5–3.

=== Game 2 ===
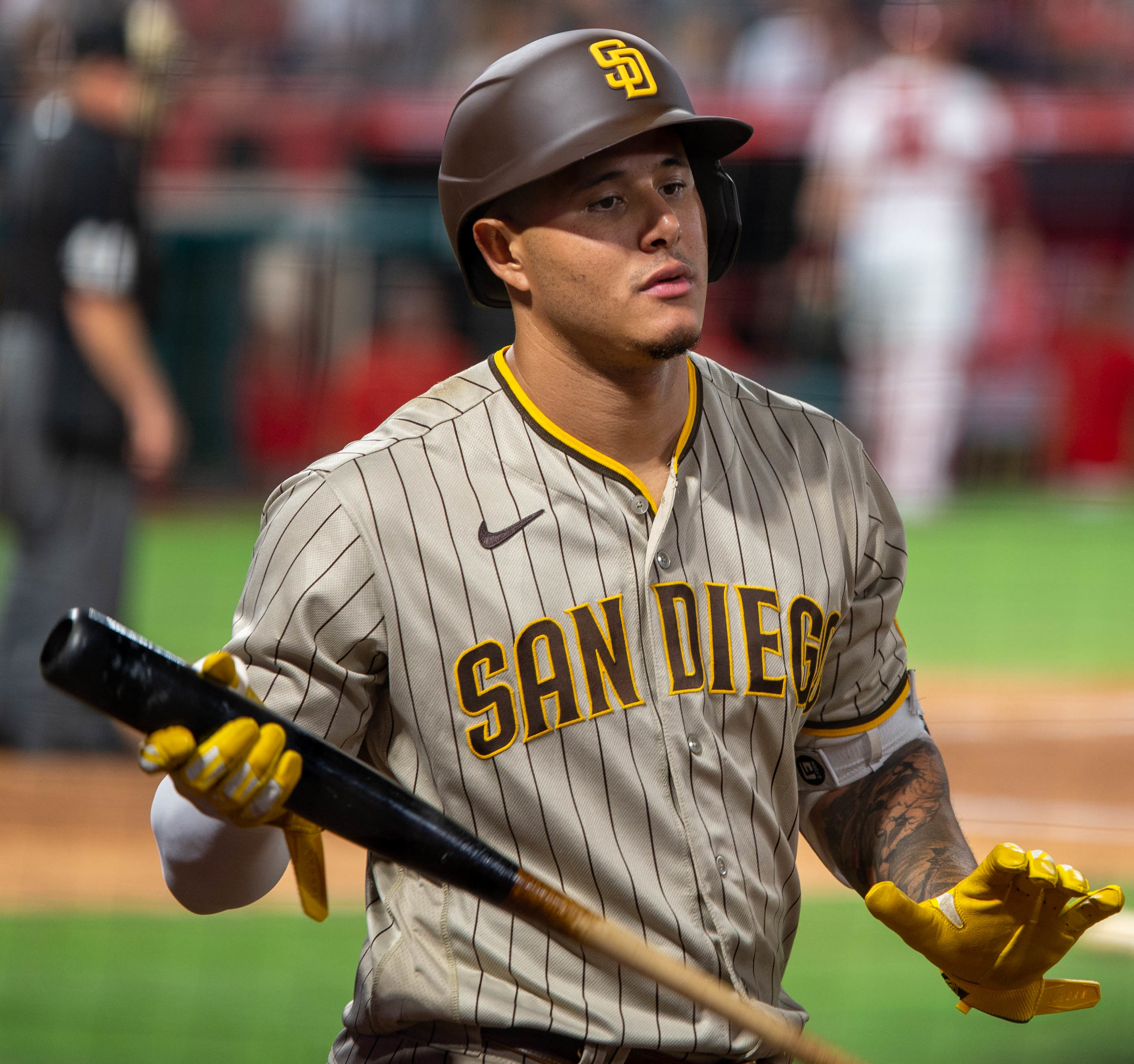
Manny Machado had two hits and two RBIs in Game 2.

October 12, 2022 5:38 pm (PDT) at Dodger Stadium in Los Angeles, California 70 °F (21 °C), Partly cloudy
Team	1	2	3	4	5	6	7	8	9	R	H	E
San Diego	1	0	2	0	0	1	0	1	0	5	9	0
Los Angeles	1	1	1	0	0	0	0	0	0	3	11	1
WP: Yu Darvish (1–0) LP: Brusdar Graterol (0–1) Sv: Josh Hader (1); Home runs: SD: Jake Cronenworth (1), Manny Machado (1); LAD: Freddie Freeman (1), Max Muncy (1), Trea Turner (2); Attendance: 53,122; Boxscore

Game 2 marked Yu Darvish's first postseason start at Dodger Stadium since he started for the Dodgers in Game 7 of the 2017 World Series, which the Dodgers lost to the Houston Astros. Injured Dodgers pitcher Walker Buehler threw out the ceremonial first pitch. Clayton Kershaw started for the Dodgers. Manny Machado and Freddie Freeman each hit solo home runs in the first inning. Los Angeles took the lead the next inning on a solo homer by Max Muncy, but the Padres regained it in the third inning, thanks to a Machado double, scoring Ha-Seong Kim, and a Jake Cronenworth ground out, scoring Juan Soto. The game was tied up again in the bottom of the inning, when Trea Turner hit a solo home run. San Diego took the lead again when Jurickson Profar singled to right field off of reliever Brusdar Graterol, scoring Cronenworth and making it 4–3, right after Turner had botched what would have been an inning-ending double play. The lead would have been bigger if not for an improbable barehanded play by Graterol to get Wil Myers out at home, thwarting a bunt attempt by Trent Grisham.

The Dodgers were close to scoring many times during the rest of the game, but ultimately they did not capitalize. In the bottom of the sixth, with baserunners on the corners and nobody out, Robert Suarez relieved Darvish and proceeded to strike out Justin Turner, then induced an inning-ending double play to keep the Dodgers out of the scoreboard. In the bottom of the seventh, Los Angeles had the bases loaded but scored no runs. In the top of the eighth, Cronenworth hit a home run that made it 5–3 San Diego. Padres closer Josh Hader earned a four-out save, his first in more than two years, as he kept the game scoreless the rest of the way. The Padres won to even up the series at a game apiece, in what was their first win against the Dodgers in the postseason.

=== Game 3 ===
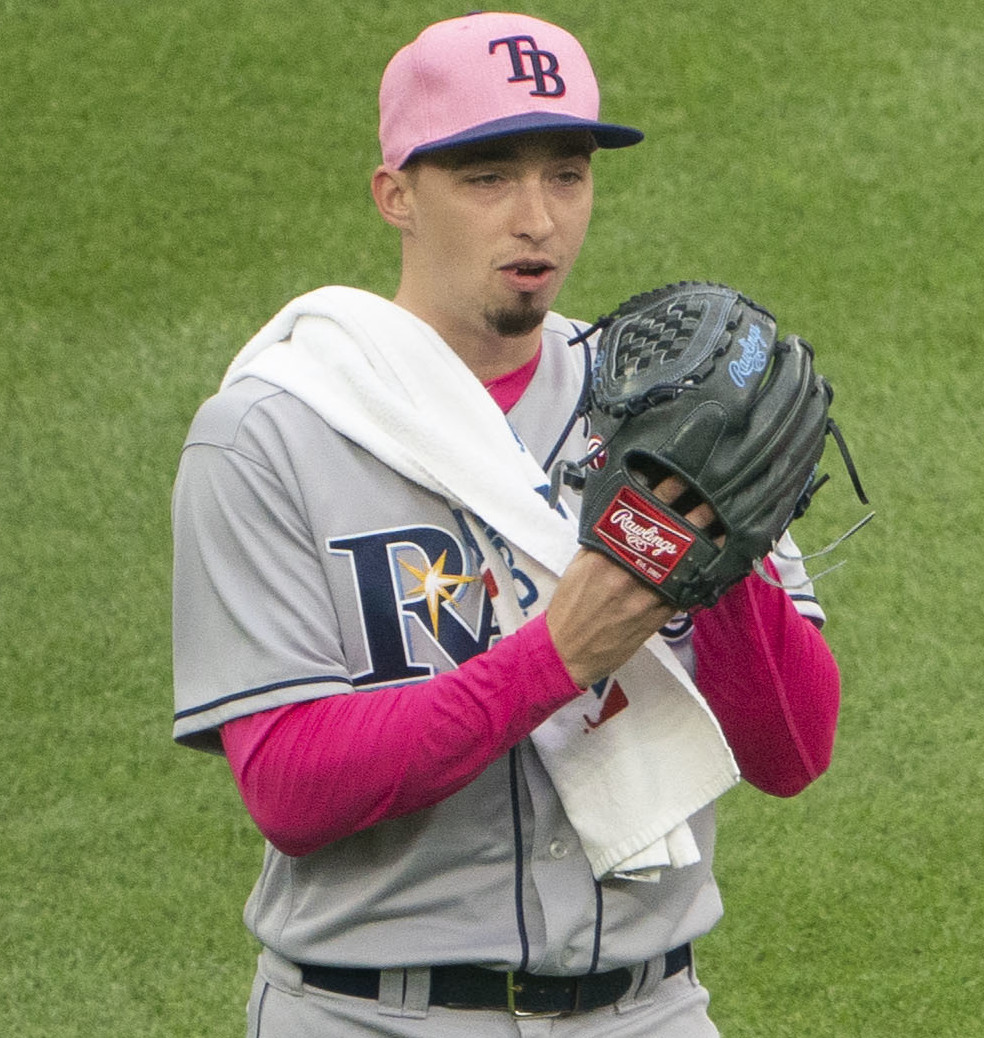
Blake Snell (pictured with Tampa Bay) was the winning pitcher for San Diego in Game 3, recording six strikeouts and one earned run over 5 1/3 innings.

October 14, 2022 6:37 pm (PDT) at Petco Park in San Diego, California 67 °F (19 °C), Cloudy
Team	1	2	3	4	5	6	7	8	9	R	H	E
Los Angeles	0	0	0	0	1	0	0	0	0	1	6	1
San Diego	1	0	0	1	0	0	0	0	X	2	7	0
WP: Blake Snell (1–0) LP: Tony Gonsolin (0–1) Sv: Josh Hader (2); Home runs: LAD: None; SD: Trent Grisham (1); Attendance: 45,137; Boxscore

In Petco Park's first playoff game before fans since the 2006 NLDS, Tony Gonsolin started for the Dodgers, while Blake Snell started for the Padres. The Padres took the early lead in the bottom of the first inning, as Jake Cronenworth drove in Juan Soto from second base. Gonsolin lasted only 1 1/3 innings after a shaky start. Trent Grisham hit a solo home run off of Andrew Heaney to double the lead in the fourth, and the Dodgers cut the lead back to one with a Mookie Betts sacrifice fly in the top of the fifth. San Diego did not record any hits since the bottom of the fourth, but its bullpen held the Dodgers scoreless, including Josh Hader with his second save in a row. The Dodgers finished the game 0-for-9 with runners in scoring position, including a bases-loaded jam in the third where they came up emptyhanded. With the win, the Padres took a 2–1 series lead, their first in the National League Division Series since 1998, and their first of the season against LA after playing at least two games.

=== Game 4 ===
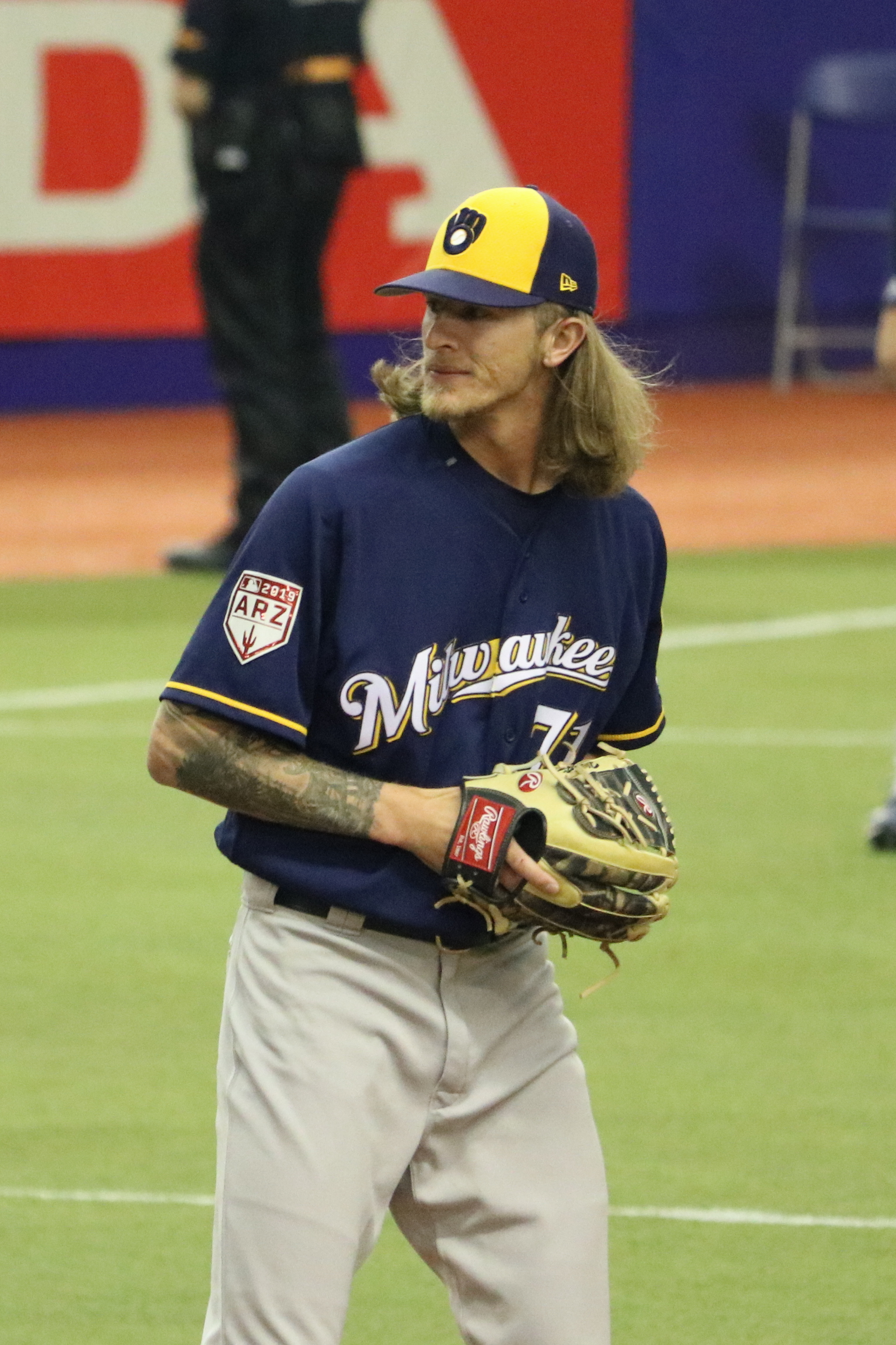
Josh Hader (pictured here with the Milwaukee Brewers) struck out the side in the ninth of Game 4 to seal the NLDS and send the Padres to the NLCS.

October 15, 2022 7:07 pm (PDT) at Petco Park in San Diego, California 67 °F (19 °C), Overcast
Team	1	2	3	4	5	6	7	8	9	R	H	E
Los Angeles	0	0	2	0	0	0	1	0	0	3	7	0
San Diego	0	0	0	0	0	0	5	0	X	5	9	0
WP: Tim Hill (1–0) LP: Yency Almonte (0–1) Sv: Josh Hader (3); Attendance: 45,139; Boxscore

Game 4 commenced following a 31-minute rain delay, Tyler Anderson started for Los Angeles while Joe Musgrove started for San Diego. Former Padres pitcher Jake Peavy threw out the ceremonial first pitch.

Musgrove worked around a Freddie Freeman double in the first when Trent Grisham made a ranging catch of a fly ball to end the inning. Tyler Anderson then worked around a Manny Machado single in the bottom of the inning. The top of the third inning saw the game's first action, with runners on second and third and one out, Freeman's two-run double gave the Dodgers the first runs of the game. In the top of the seventh, the Dodgers loaded the bases against the Padres bullpen with no outs, but only scored one run on a Will Smith sacrifice fly. Tim Hill retired the next two batters to prevent further damage. In the bottom of the seventh inning, the Padres took the lead with a five-run inning against Tommy Kahnle, Yency Almonte, and Alex Vesia. With no outs, Austin Nola drove in the Padres' first run with an infield single against Kahnle. After the Dodgers pitching change to Almonte, Ha-seong Kim doubled in a run and a single by Juan Soto tied the game at 3. Almonte then retired the next two Padres. With Jake Cronenworth at the plate, Soto proceeded to steal second and Dodgers' manager Dave Roberts changed pitchers and brought Vesia into the game. Cronenworth then singled to center plating Kim and Soto to give the Padres a 5–3 lead. Robert Suárez pitched a scoreless eighth inning for the Padres and closer Josh Hader struck out the top of the order to end the series.

With the win, the 89-win Padres completed the upset of the 111-win Dodgers in four games. The only other time in MLB playoff history that a team defeated an opponent who was more than 22 wins better was in the 1906 World Series when the 93-win Chicago White Sox defeated the 116-win Chicago Cubs. The Padres advanced to the NLCS for the first time since 1998. MLB.com ranked the Padres' upset of the Dodgers as the second greatest upset in postseason history.

In the immediate aftermath of Game 4, Los Angeles Times sportswriter Bill Plaschke called the Dodgers' series loss to the Padres "the biggest disappointment in Dodger history." Many Dodger fans have agreed with this sentiment, and some fans have even regarded the series loss as worse than any other series loss in franchise history, including the team's devastating series loss to the Washington Nationals three years prior.

=== Composite line score ===
2022 NLDS (3–1): San Diego Padres beat Los Angeles Dodgers

Team	1	2	3	4	5	6	7	8	9	R	H	E
San Diego Padres	2	0	2	1	3	1	5	1	0	15	32	1
Los Angeles Dodgers	3	1	6	0	1	0	1	0	0	12	30	1
Total attendance: 195,805 Average attendance: 48,951

== Atlanta vs. Philadelphia ==
This was the second postseason meeting between Philadelphia and Atlanta, following their 1993 National League Championship Series match-up, which was won by Philadelphia in six games. During the regular season, the Braves finished in first place in the National League East, while the Phillies finished 14 games back in third place.

=== Game 1 ===
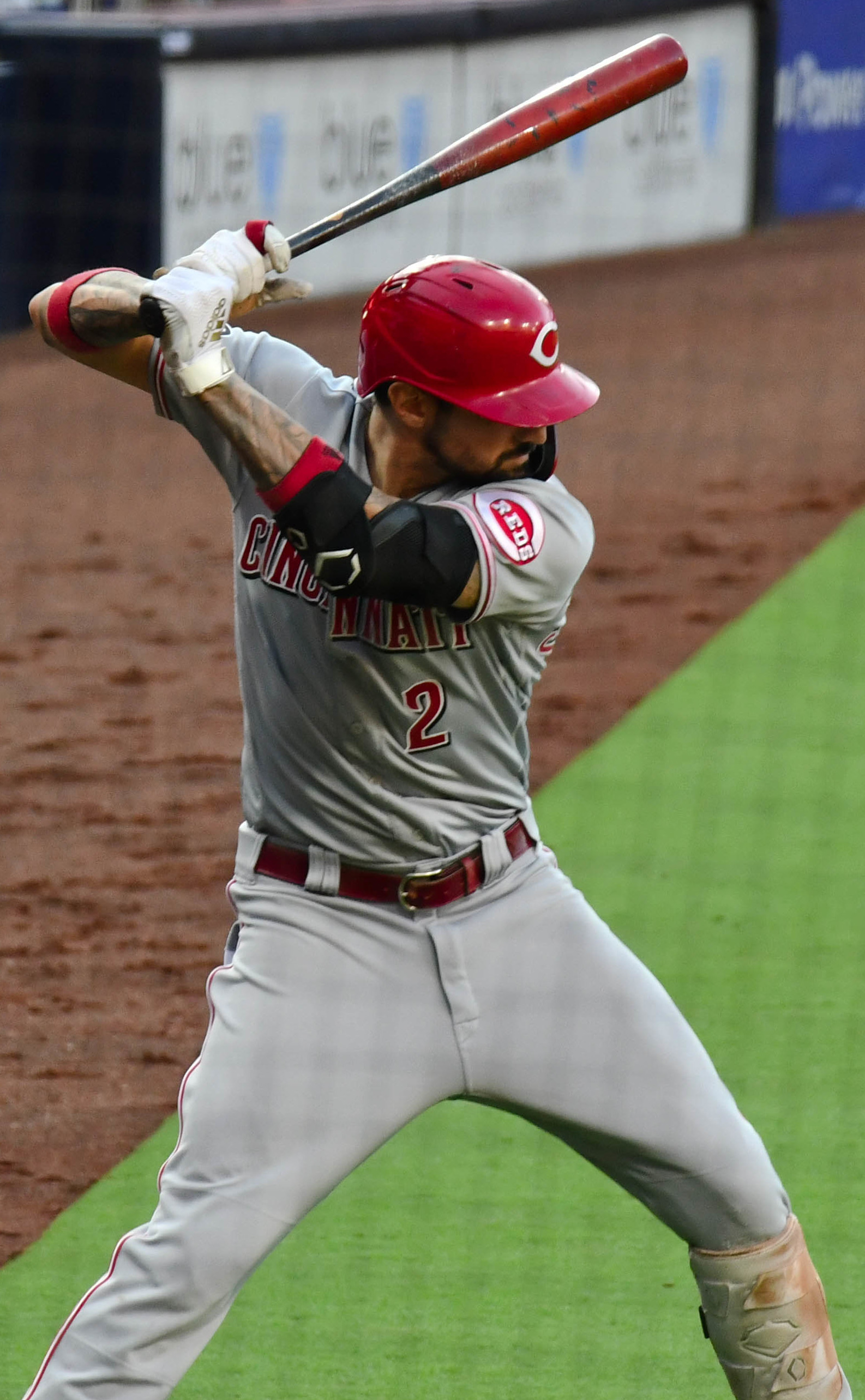
Nick Castellanos (pictured here with the Cincinnati Reds) went 3-for-5 with 3 RBIs and a game-saving catch in the ninth inning of Game 1.

October 11, 2022 1:07 pm (EDT) at Truist Park in Cumberland, Georgia 70 °F (21 °C), Mostly Sunny
Team	1	2	3	4	5	6	7	8	9	R	H	E
Philadelphia	2	0	2	2	1	0	0	0	0	7	12	0
Atlanta	0	1	0	0	2	0	0	0	3	6	9	1
WP: Seranthony Domínguez (1–0) LP: Max Fried (0–1); Home runs: PHI: None; ATL: Travis d'Arnaud (1), Matt Olson (1); Attendance: 42,641; Boxscore

The first matchup of the series featured Ranger Suárez for the Phillies going against Max Fried for the Braves. Philadelphia jumped out to an immediate 2-0 lead on a pair of RBI singles by Nick Castellanos and Alec Bohm. The Braves got on the board with a solo home run by Travis d'Arnaud to lead off the second, but the Phillies answered back in the third with a Bohm sacrifice fly and a Jean Segura RBI single. Castellanos tacked on two more runs in the fourth with a bases-loaded single and Edmundo Sosa drove in another on a sacrifice fly in the fifth to push the game to a 7–1 lead. Neither starter made it out of the fourth inning as the bullpens for both teams took over. d'Arnaud continued his fine day with a two-run double in the bottom of the fifth to get Atlanta back in the game as both bullpens held through the ninth. Atlanta threatened a comeback as Matt Olson launched a three-run homer to bring the game within one, but Castellanos made a game-saving catch in right field and Zach Eflin induced a d'Arnaud groundout to seal a thrilling Game 1 victory for the Phillies.

=== Game 2 ===
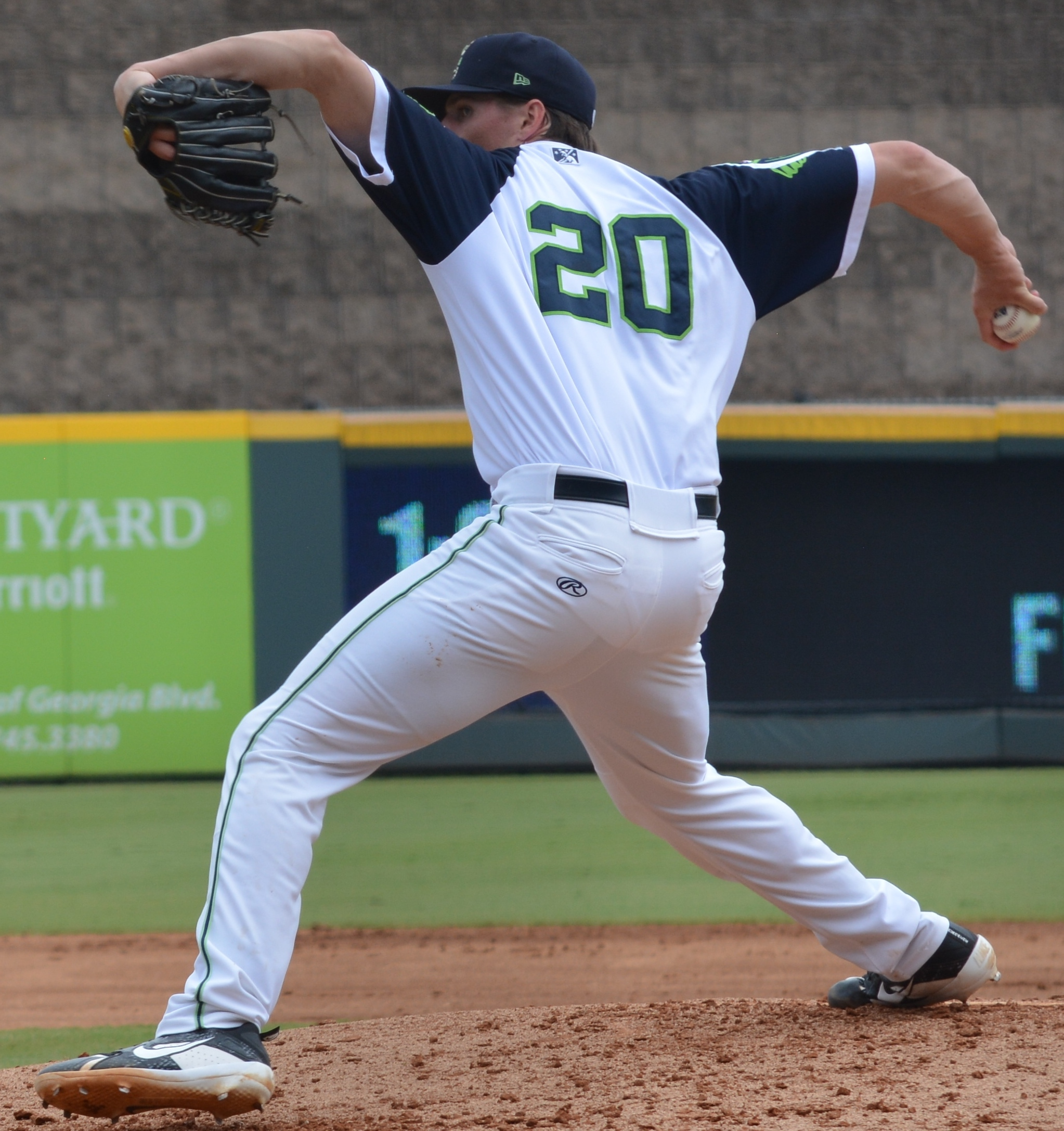
Kyle Wright (pictured here with the Gwinnett Stripers) struck out 6 batters and got the win in Game 2.

October 12, 2022 7:30 pm (EDT) at Truist Park in Cumberland, Georgia 66 °F (19 °C), Overcast
Team	1	2	3	4	5	6	7	8	9	R	H	E
Philadelphia	0	0	0	0	0	0	0	0	0	0	3	0
Atlanta	0	0	0	0	0	3	0	0	X	3	4	0
WP: Kyle Wright (1–0) LP: Zack Wheeler (0–1) Sv: Kenley Jansen (1); Attendance: 42,735; Boxscore

Game 2 was delayed by 2 hours and 55 minutes due to rain.

20-game winner Kyle Wright went up against Zack Wheeler in Game 2 as the Braves looked to even up the series. Both pitchers looked sharp as they both cruised through five scoreless innings, but Atlanta broke through with three runs on three straight singles by Matt Olson, Austin Riley, and Travis d'Arnaud in the sixth. Wright finished his night with no runs and six strikeouts over six innings while Wheeler was tagged for three runs and five strikeouts over six. The Braves bullpen shut down the Phillies for the last three innings as Kenley Jansen finished off the game with a perfect ninth to even the series 1–1.

=== Game 3 ===
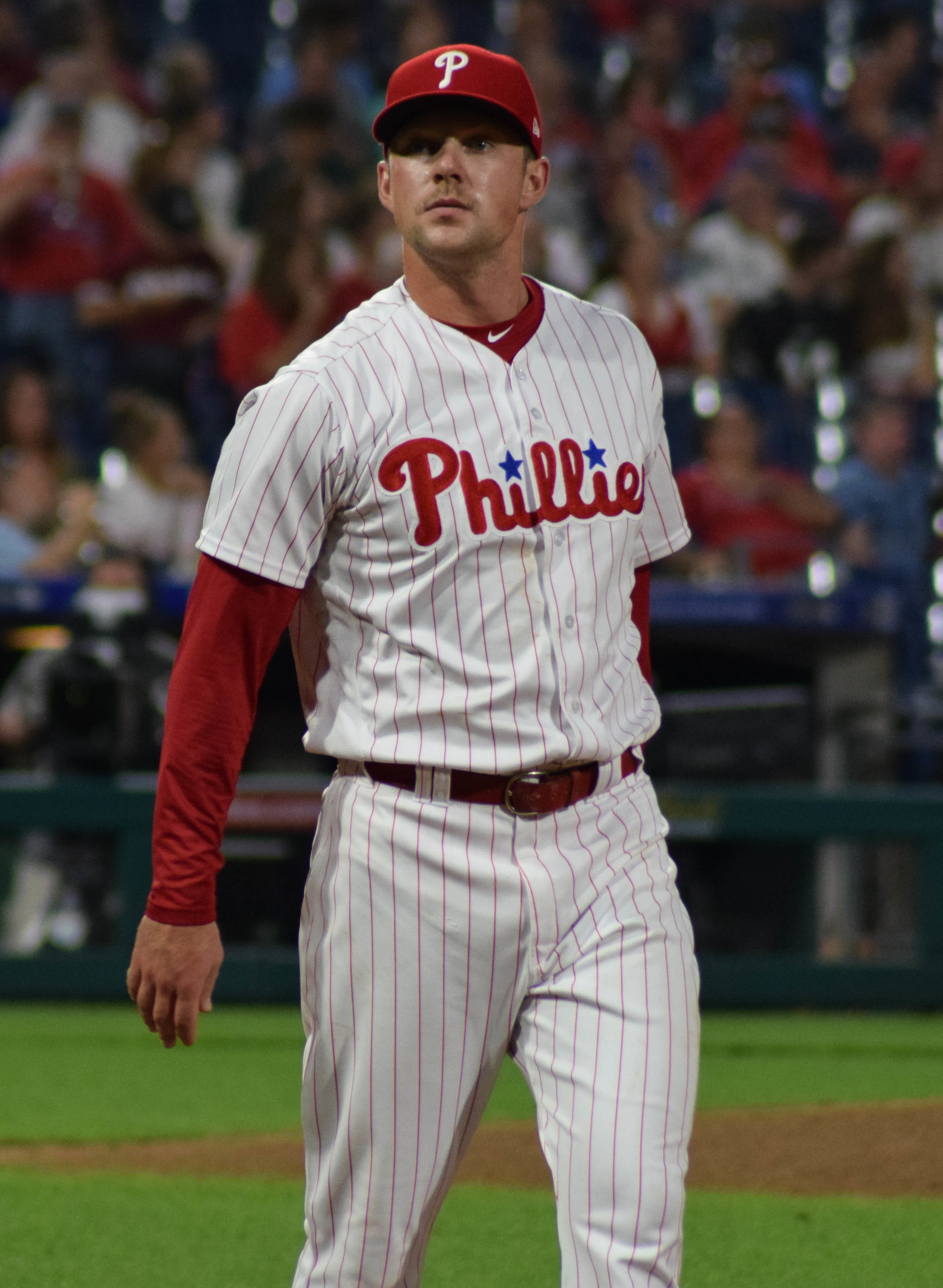
Rhys Hoskins hit a dramatic three-run homer in Game 3.

October 14, 2022 4:37 pm (EDT) at Citizens Bank Park in Philadelphia, Pennsylvania 69 °F (21 °C), Sunny
Team	1	2	3	4	5	6	7	8	9	R	H	E
Atlanta	0	0	0	0	0	1	0	0	0	1	6	1
Philadelphia	0	0	6	0	0	0	3	0	X	9	8	2
WP: Aaron Nola (1–0) LP: Spencer Strider (0–1); Home runs: ATL: None; PHI: Rhys Hoskins (1), Bryce Harper (1); Attendance: 45,538; Boxscore

Spencer Strider squared off against Aaron Nola in the first postseason game in Philadelphia since 2011. After a quiet first two innings, the Phillies offense exploded for six runs in the third. Bryson Stott got the scoring started with an RBI double before Snitker intentionally walked Kyle Schwarber to get to Rhys Hoskins who was 1-for-19 with 7 strikeouts in the postseason thus far. Hoskins crushed the first pitch for a three-run homer and spiked his bat in celebration as the Phillies grabbed a 4-0 lead. Strider did not make it out of the inning, getting pulled after another hit by J. T. Realmuto ended his night with 2 1/3 innings pitched. Dylan Lee came on in relief and, with the first pitch he threw, gave up a two-run homer to Bryce Harper to extend the lead to 6-0. Michael Harris II drove in the Braves' only run in the sixth with an RBI single, but Nola closed out the inning and finished his night with one run and six strikeouts over six innings. The Phillies scored three more in the seventh with a Harper RBI double and a two-run single from Nick Castellanos and Connor Brogdon slammed the door with a perfect ninth to give the Phillies a 2–1 series lead.

=== Game 4 ===
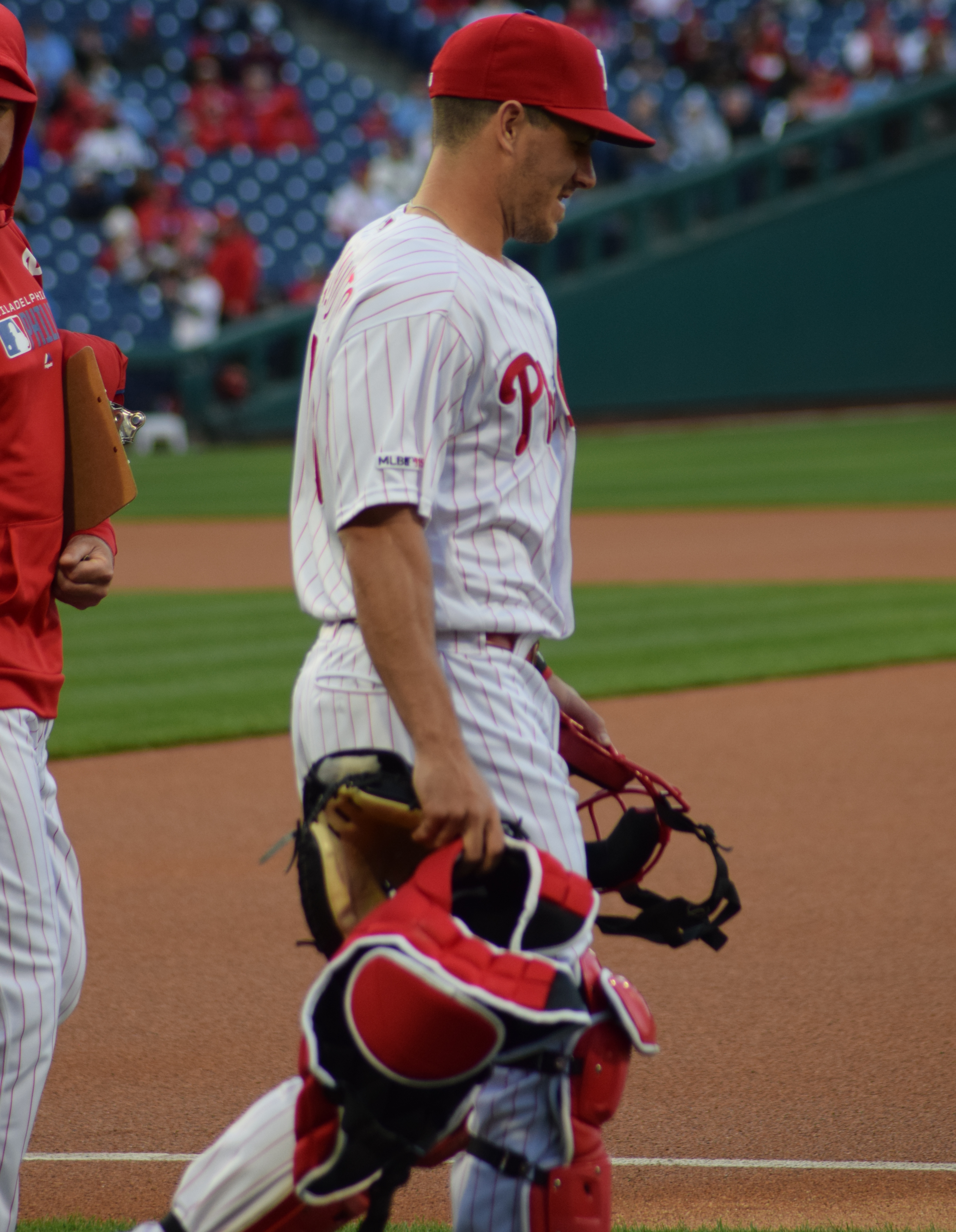
J. T. Realmuto hit an inside-the-park home run in Game 4.

October 15, 2022 2:07 pm (EDT) at Citizens Bank Park in Philadelphia, Pennsylvania 72 °F (22 °C), Sunny
Team	1	2	3	4	5	6	7	8	9	R	H	E
Atlanta	0	0	1	1	0	0	1	0	0	3	4	0
Philadelphia	0	3	1	0	0	3	0	1	X	8	13	0
WP: Brad Hand (1–0) LP: Charlie Morton (0–1); Home runs: ATL: Orlando Arcia (1), Matt Olson (2), Travis d'Arnaud (2); PHI: Brandon Marsh (1), J. T. Realmuto (1), Bryce Harper (2); Attendance: 45,660; Boxscore

The Braves turned to Charlie Morton, who owned a 5-0 record and 0.73 ERA in elimination games, to save their season and force a Game 5 as the Phillies tabbed midseason acquisition Noah Syndergaard to end it. Once again, the Phillies offense got started early as Brandon Marsh crushed a three-run home run in the second off of Morton after he was hit in the elbow on a line-drive by Alec Bohm. Orlando Arcia responded with a solo home run in the third to get the Braves on the board, but J. T. Realmuto answered with an inside-the-park home run, the first in the postseason by a catcher, off of Collin McHugh who came on in relief of the injured Morton. Matt Olson cut the lead in half with a solo homer in the fourth, but the Phillies broke the game open with three consecutive RBI singles off the bats of Rhys Hoskins, Realmuto, and Bryce Harper in the sixth inning. Travis d'Arnaud hit a solo homer in the seventh, but that was the last time Atlanta scored as the Phillies bullpen pitched a clean eighth and ninth, punctuated by a Bryce Harper solo homer in the eighth. With the win, the 87-win Phillies defeated the 101-win and defending World Series champion Braves to advance to the National League Championship Series for the first time since 2010.

=== Composite line score ===
2022 NLDS (3–1): Philadelphia Phillies beat Atlanta Braves

Team	1	2	3	4	5	6	7	8	9	R	H	E
Philadelphia Phillies	2	3	9	2	1	3	3	1	0	24	36	2
Atlanta Braves	0	1	1	1	2	4	1	0	3	13	23	2
Total attendance: 176,574 Average attendance: 44,144

== See also ==
- 2022 American League Division Series
- Dodgers–Padres rivalry
- Braves–Phillies rivalry
