= Rob Thomson =

Canadian baseball coach and manager (born 1963)

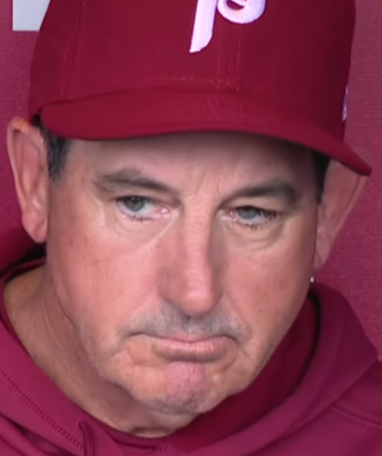
- Thomson with the Philadelphia Phillies in 2024
- Manager
- Born: August 16, 1963 (age 63); Sarnia, Ontario, Canada
- Bats: Right Throws: Right

MLB statistics
- Managerial record: 355–270
- Winning %: .568
- Stats at Baseball Reference
- Managerial record at Baseball Reference

Teams
- As manager: Philadelphia Phillies (2022–2026); As coach: New York Yankees (2008–2017); Philadelphia Phillies (2018–2022)

Career highlights and awards
- World Series champion (2009)

Member of the Canadian

Baseball Hall of Fame
- Induction: 2019

Robert Lewis Thomson (born August 16, 1963), nicknamed "Topper", is a Canadian professional baseball manager. He managed the Philadelphia Phillies of Major League Baseball (MLB) from 2022 to 2026.

During Thomson's playing career, he was a catcher and third baseman in the Detroit Tigers organization from 1985 to 1988. Following his years as a player, Thomson spent one year as the manager of the Class A Oneonta Yankees, and several more years in various front office capacities for the New York Yankees organization. He then served as the Yankees’ bench coach in 2008, third base coach from 2009 to 2014, and bench coach again from 2015 to 2017.

In 2018, Thomson was hired as the bench coach of the Philadelphia Phillies. On June 3, 2022, Thomson was named interim manager of the Philadelphia Phillies following the firing of manager Joe Girardi. After leading the Phillies to their first postseason appearance since 2011, Thomson was named the full-time manager on October 10, 2022. That year, he went on to lead the Phillies to their first National League pennant since 2009. Thomson led the Phillies to four postseason appearances and two National League East titles in his four seasons with the team before his firing shortly after the start of the 2026 season.

== Early life ==
Thomson was born on August 16, 1963, in Sarnia, Ontario, and grew up in nearby Corunna, Ontario. He grew up playing baseball in the summers and hockey in the winter. Thomson has a younger sister and two older brothers, one of whom signed with the Montreal Expos.

== Playing career ==
=== College career ===
Thomson was a standout for the Stratford Nationals of the Intercounty Baseball League. From there, he was recruited to St. Clair County Community College where he played on their baseball team for one year. After a year, he transferred to the University of Kansas. Thomson led the Jayhawks in hits in 1984 and 1985 and holds the school record for the highest single-season batting average.

=== Detroit Tigers ===
Thomson was selected by the Detroit Tigers in the 32nd round of the 1985 Major League Baseball draft from the University of Kansas. He played catcher and third base in the Tigers' minor league system until 1988, reaching as high as Class A. In 661 at bats, he hit .225/.312/.304 with seven home runs and three steals. He played 136 games at catcher, 55 games at third base, and pitched in one game.

=== International career ===
Thomson represented Canada in baseball, which was a demonstration sport, in the 1984 Summer Olympics in Los Angeles.

== Coaching and front office career ==
=== Detroit Tigers (1988–1989) ===
From 1988 to 1990, Thomson served as a minor league coach in the Detroit Tigers organization. Thomson says he got into coaching because "I wasn’t a good enough player. The game sort of forced me into coaching. I was lucky enough the Tigers thought enough of me as an evaluator, teacher and an organizer to offer me a coaching position."

=== New York Yankees (1990–2017) ===
In 1990, Thomson joined the New York Yankees organization as a third base coach for the team's Class A affiliate, the Oneonta Yankees, eventually becoming the manager in 1995. He moved into the front office in 1998 as a Field Coordinator, and became Director of Player Development in 2000. Prior to the 2003 season, he was named Vice President of Minor League Development, and was named to the Yankees major league coaching staff in November of the same year.

During the 1994–95 MLB strike, Thomson managed the Canberra Bushrangers of the original Australian Baseball League.

On September 27, 2006, Thomson took over as first base coach of the Yankees in place of Tony Peña, who had learned before the game his father had died, then filled in at the position for four games before Peña returned in time for the season finale on October 1.

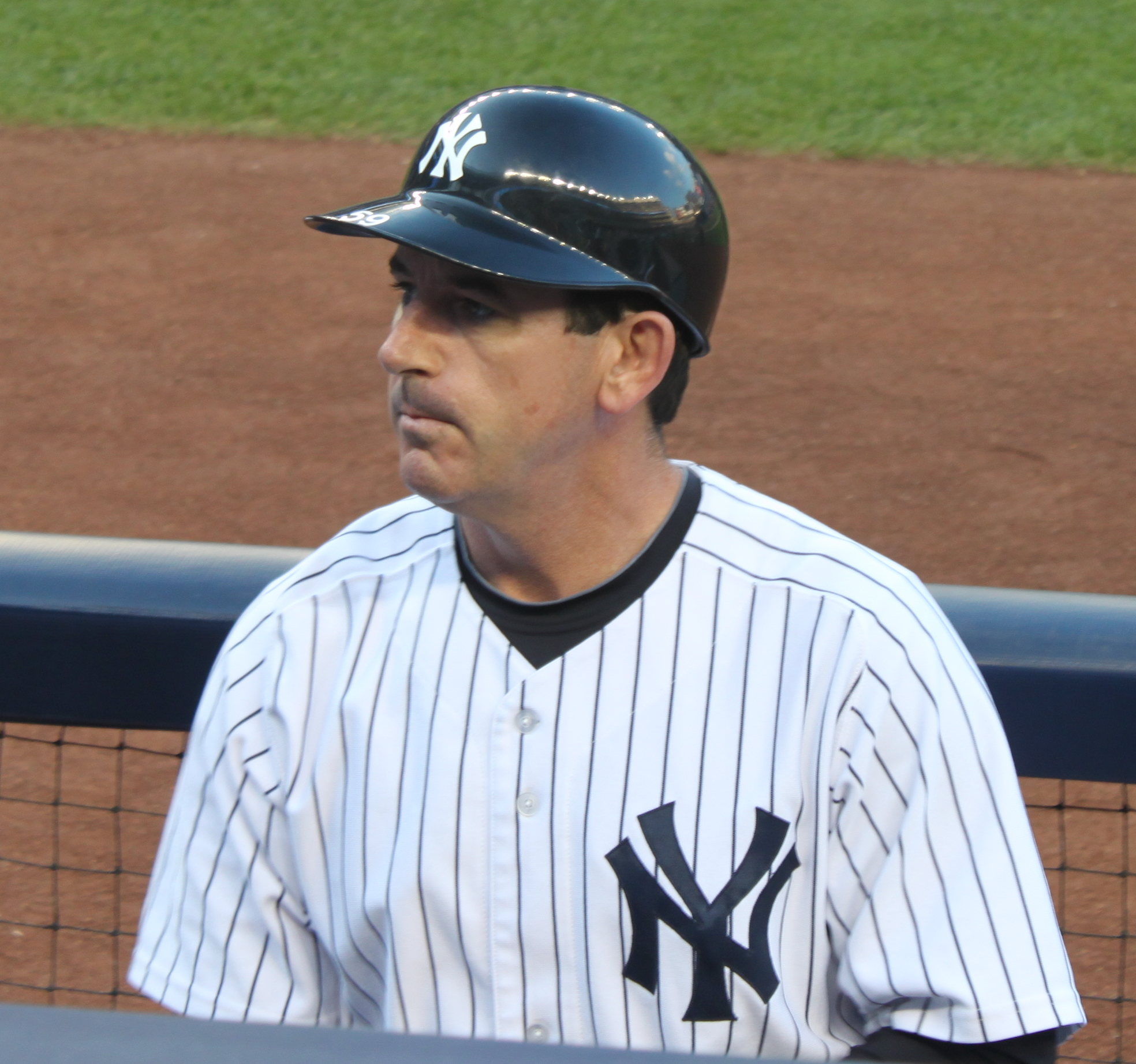
Thomson with the Yankees in 2011

Prior to the 2008 season, incoming manager Joe Girardi named Thomson his bench coach. On April 4, 2008, Girardi became ill due to a respiratory infection and designated Thomson to manage that night's game against the Tampa Bay Rays. It was Thomson's first major league game as a manager, at which he became the first Canadian to manage a major league game since George Gibson for the Pittsburgh Pirates in 1934. Thomson would also manage the April 5 game due to Girardi's illness.

Thomson served as the team's third base coach for six seasons and was a member of the coaching staff for the Yankees' 2009 championship team. Prior to the 2015 season, Thomson was named the team's bench coach, which was a role he held until the end of the 2017 season.

Thomson developed his nickname of "Topper" during his time with the Yankees. For five seasons, Thomson ran the Yankees' spring training camp. Joe Torre, the Yankees' manager at the time, nicknamed Thomson "Topper", because he "was always on top of everything" while running the camp.

=== Philadelphia Phillies (2018–2026) ===
Following the 2017 season, the Yankees parted ways with manager Joe Girardi. Thomson was initially a candidate to fill the role, but the team ultimately hired Aaron Boone as manager instead. On December 5, 2017, after 28 seasons with the organization, Thomson left the Yankees and was hired as the bench coach for the Philadelphia Phillies, joining the staff under first-year manager Gabe Kapler. After the 2019 season, the Phillies fired Kapler, but Thomson remained the Phillies’ bench coach. The Phillies would ultimately hire Joe Girardi as their new manager, reuniting Thomson with his former manager from the Yankees.

Prior to the 2022 season, Thomson had stated to the team that it would be his last as a bench coach, intending to retire after the completion of the season. However, on June 3, 2022, the Phillies fired manager Joe Girardi after a disappointing 22–29 start to the season. The same day, Thomson was named the Phillies’ interim manager. The Phillies won their first game under Thomson, blanking the Los Angeles Angels 10–0, and then won 13 of their next 15 games and moved back into playoff contention.

With his appointment as interim manager, Thomson became the first Canadian to manage a major league team since George Gibson managed the Pittsburgh Pirates in 1934. On July 12, 2022, Thomson managed a game against the Toronto Blue Jays at the Rogers Centre, becoming the first Canadian to manage a major league game in Canada.

Thomson finished the 2022 regular season with a 65–46 record as interim manager, leading the Phillies to an 87–75 record and a wild card berth, their first postseason appearance since 2011. Thomson became the fourth interim manager in MLB history to take over a team at least seven games under .500 and lead them to the postseason. In the Wild Card Series, the Phillies would sweep the NL Central-champion St. Louis Cardinals, giving the team their first playoff series win since 2010. Following the Wild Card Series win, the Phillies removed Thomson's interim tag and officially named him the 55th manager in franchise history, with a two-year contract. In the National League Division Series, the Phillies pulled off another upset, defeating the NL East-champion Atlanta Braves 3–1 to advance to the National League Championship Series. In the NLCS, the Phillies defeated the San Diego Padres in five games to win their first league pennant since 2009. Thomson became the first manager to lead their team to the World Series after taking over during the season since Jack McKeon with the Florida Marlins in 2003. In the World Series, the Phillies would play the Houston Astros, however, despite taking a 2–1 series lead, the Astros would defeat the Phillies in six games. Thomson received criticism for his managerial decisions in Game 6 of the series, as in the sixth inning, with the Phillies leading 1–0, Thomson pulled starting pitcher Zack Wheeler after 70 pitches and replaced him with reliever José Alvarado, who would go on to give up a go-ahead home run to Yordan Alvarez. The Astros would go on to defeat the Phillies 4–1 and clinch the series victory. Analysts noted the similarity of Thomson's decision to Tampa Bay Rays manager Kevin Cash's decision to pull starter Blake Snell in Game 6 of the 2020 World Series.

On June 15, 2023, Thomson earned his 100th win as a manager with a 5–4 Phillies victory over the Arizona Diamondbacks. After another slow start to the season, Thomson led the Phillies to a 90–72 record and a second-straight wild card berth. In the Wild Card Series, the Phillies swept the Miami Marlins before meeting the Atlanta Braves in the National League Division Series. For the second-straight year, the Phillies upset the Braves in four games, advancing to the National League Championship Series. In the NLCS against the Arizona Diamondbacks, the Phillies quickly took a 2–0 series lead, but were unable to advance to the World Series for the second-straight season after losing four of the next five games in the series. Thomson received criticism for the Phillies' collapse, with some noting Thomson's use of reliever Craig Kimbrel in Game 4 as a turning point in the series. In the previous game, Kimbrel had given up the walk-off hit in a 24-pitch outing, and in Game 4, Thomson brought Kimbrel in again for the eighth inning, where he gave up a game-tying home run to Alek Thomas. The Diamondbacks would end up winning the game 6–5, evening the series at 2–2. While the Phillies did win Game 5 to take a 3–2 series lead back to Philadelphia, they lost both Games 6 and 7 to lose the NLCS.

In 2024, the Phillies achieved a 95–67 record en route to their first NL East division title since 2011, but were eliminated in the 2024 National League Division Series by the New York Mets in four games. On October 15, 2024, Thomson and the Phillies agreed to a contract extension running through the 2026 season.

In 2025, Thomson led the Phillies to a 96–66 record, successfully defending the NL East division title and achieving the bye into the 2025 National League Division Series. The Phillies would be eliminated by the Los Angeles Dodgers marking back-to-back years the Phillies were eliminated in the Division Series. Thomson took heat following the Phillies’ loss to the Dodgers in the NL Division Series. A few in-game moves backfired, including his decision to have Bryson Stott bunt with the potential tying run on second base and no outs in the bottom of the ninth inning in Game 2. Afterwards, Phillies president of baseball operations Dave Dombrowski stated at the end of season press conference that he intended to extend Thomson through the 2027 season. A contract extension was officially agreed upon on December 9, 2025.

On April 28, 2026, the Phillies fired Thomson after a 9–19 record to start the 2026 season. Don Mattingly, whom Thomson had originally replaced as bench coach of the Yankees in 2008, was promoted from bench coach to interim manager, under his son Preston. Thomson finished his managerial tenure with a 355–270 record, four playoff appearances, two National League East division titles, and one National League pennant. His .568 winning percentage is the highest for a manager in Phillies franchise history since 1900. In a press conference that same day, Phillies president of baseball operations Dave Dombrowski announced that Thomson had been offered a special assistant role in the front office, which Thomson has expressed interest in taking at a later date.

== Managerial record ==
As of games played on April 26, 2026

Team	Year	Regular season					Postseason			
Team	Year	Games	Won	Lost	Win %	Finish	Won	Lost	Win %	Result
PHI	2022	111	65	46	.586	3rd in NL East	11	6	.647	Lost World Series (HOU)
PHI	2023	162	90	72	.556	2nd in NL East	8	5	.615	Lost NLCS (AZ)
PHI	2024	162	95	67	.586	1st in NL East	1	3	.250	Lost NLDS (NYM)
PHI	2025	162	96	66	.593	1st in NL East	1	3	.250	Lost NLDS (LAD)
PHI	2026	28	9	19	.321	Fired	–	–	–	
Total		625	355	270	.568		21	17	.553	

== Personal life ==
Thomson lives in Stratford, Ontario, with his wife, Michele. In the past, Thomson lived in Tampa, Florida and New York City. He has two daughters.

Sporting positions
Preceded by Bobby Meacham	New York Yankees Third Base Coach; 2009–2014	Succeeded by Joe Espada
Preceded by Tony Peña	New York Yankees Bench Coach; 2015–2017	Succeeded by Josh Bard
Preceded by Larry Bowa	Philadelphia Phillies Bench Coach; 2018–2022	Succeeded by Mike Calitri
Preceded by Joe Girardi	Philadelphia Phillies Manager; 2022–2026	Succeeded by Don Mattingly
