= Juaron Watts-Brown =

American baseball player (born 2002)

- Watts-Brown in 2026

Baltimore Orioles
- Pitcher
- Born: February 23, 2002 (age 24); Visalia, California, U.S.
- Bats: Right Throws: Right
- Stats at Baseball Reference

Juaron Donovan Watts-Brown (born February 23, 2002) is an American professional baseball pitcher in the Baltimore Orioles organization.

== Amateur career ==
Watts-Brown grew up in Hanford, California and attended Hanford High School. He was named the West Yosemite League Player of the Year in football and basketball during his senior year. Watts-Brown committed to play college baseball at Texas Tech, but suffered a shoulder injury and ultimately enrolled at Long Beach State.

Watts-Brown began his college baseball career at Long Beach State and redshirted his true freshman season while recovering from surgery to repair a torn labrum. After the season, he played summer collegiate baseball for the Brockton Rox of the Futures Collegiate Baseball League (FCBL). Watts was a member of Long Beach State's starting rotation as a redshirt freshman and pitched a no-hitter with 16 strikeouts against UC-Riverside on May 8, 2022. Watts-Brown finished the season with a 4-4 record and an 3.68 ERA and 111 strikeouts.

After the season Watts-Brown transferred to Oklahoma State. In 2022, he played collegiate summer baseball with the Falmouth Commodores of the Cape Cod Baseball League.

== Professional career ==
=== Toronto Blue Jays ===
Watts-Brown was selected by the Toronto Blue Jays in the third round with the 89th overall pick of the 2023 Major League Baseball draft. On July 21, 2023, he signed with the Blue Jays for $1,002,785. Watts-Brown made his professional debut in 2024, splitting the season between the Single-A Dunedin Blue Jays and High-A Vancouver Canadians. In 21 starts for the two affiliates, he compiled a combined 4-11 record and 4.72 ERA with 131 strikeouts over 103 innings of work.

Watts-Brown began the 2025 season with Vancouver, posting a 3.62 ERA over eight starts; following a promotion to the Double-A New Hampshire Fisher Cats, he compiled a 2-2 record and 3.48 ERA with 53 strikeouts across 11 starts.

=== Baltimore Orioles ===
On July 29, 2025, the Blue Jays traded Watts-Brown to the Baltimore Orioles in exchange for Seranthony Domínguez and cash considerations.
