= Jake Cronenworth =

American baseball player (born 1994)

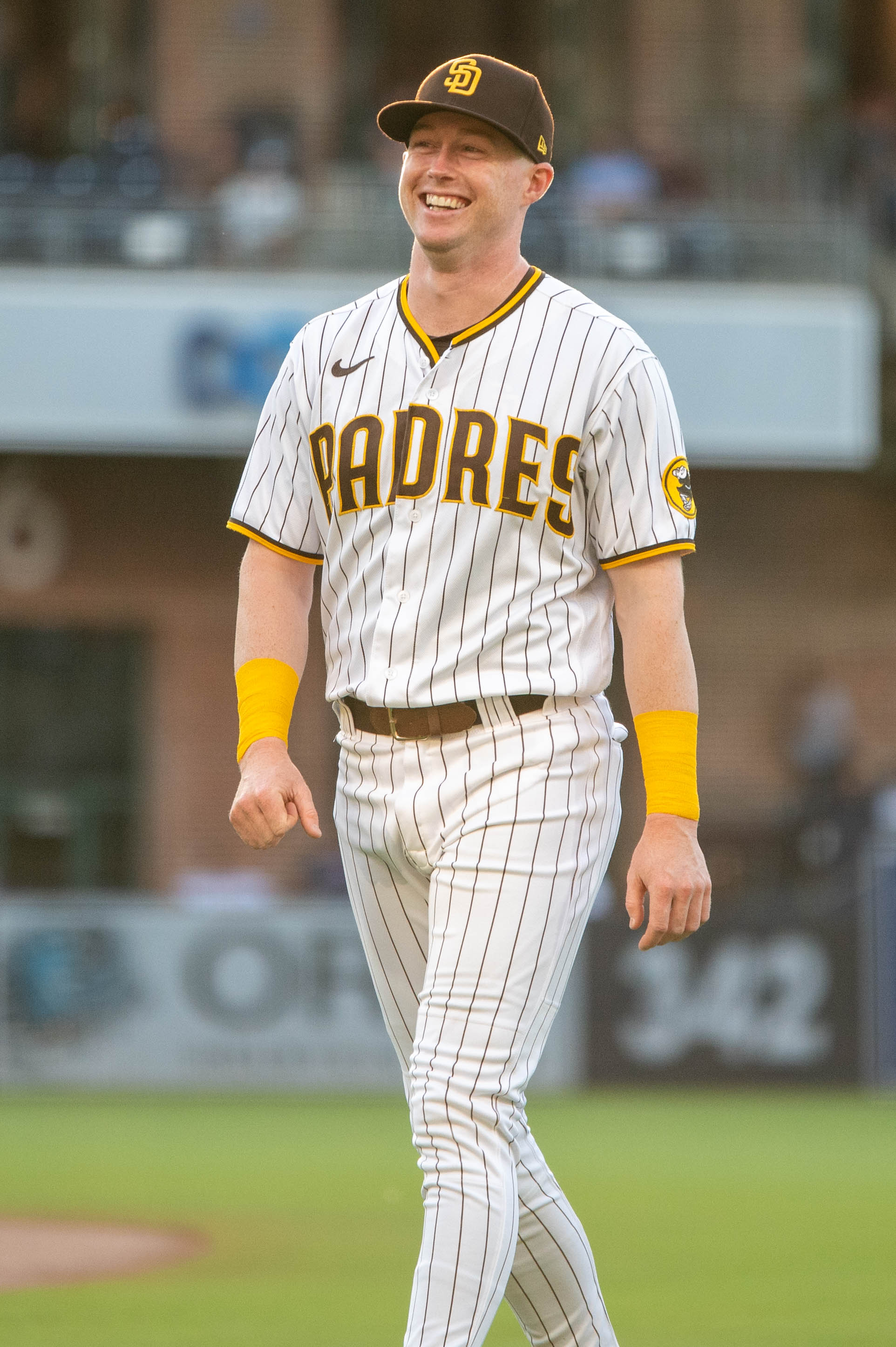
- Cronenworth with the San Diego Padres in 2021

San Diego Padres – No. 9
- Infielder
- Born: January 21, 1994 (age 32); St. Clair, Michigan, U.S.
- Bats: Left Throws: Right

MLB debut
- July 26, 2020, for the San Diego Padres

MLB statistics (through 2026 season)
- Batting average: .245
- Home runs: 87
- Runs batted in: 410
- Stats at Baseball Reference

Teams
- San Diego Padres (2020–present)

Career highlights and awards
- 2× All-Star (2021, 2022)

Jacob John Cronenworth (born January 21, 1994) is an American professional baseball infielder for the San Diego Padres of Major League Baseball (MLB).

Cronenworth was born and raised in eastern Michigan. He played three seasons of college baseball for the Michigan Wolverines. Cronenworth forewent his final year of college eligibility when he was selected by the Tampa Bay Rays in the seventh round of the 2015 MLB draft. He played five seasons in the Rays farm system and spent time with the United States national baseball team in 2019.

In December 2019, Cronenworth was sent to the Padres in a multi-player trade. He made his MLB debut in 2020 and finished second in National League (NL) Rookie of the Year voting. On July 16, 2021, Cronenworth hit for the cycle, becoming the third player in Padres history to do so. He received All-Star selections in 2021 and 2022.

== Amateur career ==
Cronenworth attended St. Clair High School in St. Clair, Michigan, and played college baseball at the University of Michigan. At Michigan, he was an infielder and closing pitcher. In 2014, he played collegiate summer baseball for the Orleans Firebirds of the Cape Cod Baseball League.

== Professional career ==
=== Tampa Bay Rays ===
The Tampa Bay Rays selected Cronenworth in the seventh round of the 2015 Major League Baseball (MLB) draft. He made his professional debut with the Hudson Valley Renegades. He played 2016 with the Bowling Green Hot Rods and Charlotte Stone Crabs (batting a combined .282/.389/.386), 2017 with Charlotte and the Montgomery Biscuits (batting a combined .274/.364/.358), and 2018 with Montgomery and Durham Bulls (batting a combined .253/.321/.345).

Cronenworth started 2019 with the Durham Bulls. During the season, he pitched in a game for the first time since college, going 7.1 scoreless innings with 9 strikeouts over seven games. In 2019 playing for two teams in the minor leagues he batted .329/.422/.511 with 10 home runs and 45 RBIs.

After the season, on October 10, 2019, Cronenworth was selected for the United States national baseball team in the 2019 WBSC Premier 12. In the tournament he batted .103/.133/.241 with one home run and two RBIs in 28 at bats. The Rays added Cronenworth to their 40–man roster following the 2019 season.

=== San Diego Padres ===
On December 6, 2019, Cronenworth and Tommy Pham were traded to the San Diego Padres in exchange for Hunter Renfroe, Xavier Edwards, and a player to be named later (PTBNL). The PTBNL, Esteban Quiroz, was named in March 2020.

Cronenworth made his MLB debut with the Padres on July 26, 2020, and notched a hit and an RBI against the Arizona Diamondbacks. On August 4, Cronenworth hit his first MLB home run off Dustin May in a game against the Los Angeles Dodgers. On August 22, Cronenworth hit his first career grand slam off of Humberto Castellanos of the Houston Astros. Cronenworth was named NL Rookie of the Month in August 2020 after hitting .356 with 16 extra base hits, 17 RBIs and 20 runs over 31 games. Cronenworth finished the season hitting .285 with 4 home runs and 20 RBIs in 54 games. He tied with Alec Bohm of the Philadelphia Phillies for second place in NL Rookie of the Year voting, behind Devin Williams of the Milwaukee Brewers.

On July 4, 2021, Cronenworth was selected to his first All-Star Game as a reserve. In his first game back from the All-Star Break on July 16, he hit for the cycle at Nationals Park against the Washington Nationals. He finished the 2021 season batting .266/.340/.460 with 21 home runs, 71 RBIs and 94 runs scored.

On October 14, 2022, Cronenworth had the game-winning 2-run single in the bottom of the 7th inning of Game 4 of the NLDS to finish off the Padres' defeat of the rival Los Angeles Dodgers.

On January 13, 2023, Cronenworth agreed to a one-year, $4.225 million contract with the Padres, avoiding salary arbitration.

On April 1, 2023, Cronenworth and the Padres agreed to a seven-year, $80 million contract extension; the new extension keeps Cronenworth with the Padres through the 2030 season.

== Personal life ==
Cronenworth and Brooke Fletcher were married in January 2025 in Mexico.

Achievements
Preceded by Trea Turner	Hitting for the cycle July 16, 2021	Succeeded by Freddie Freeman
