= Seranthony Domínguez =

Dominican baseball player (born 1994)

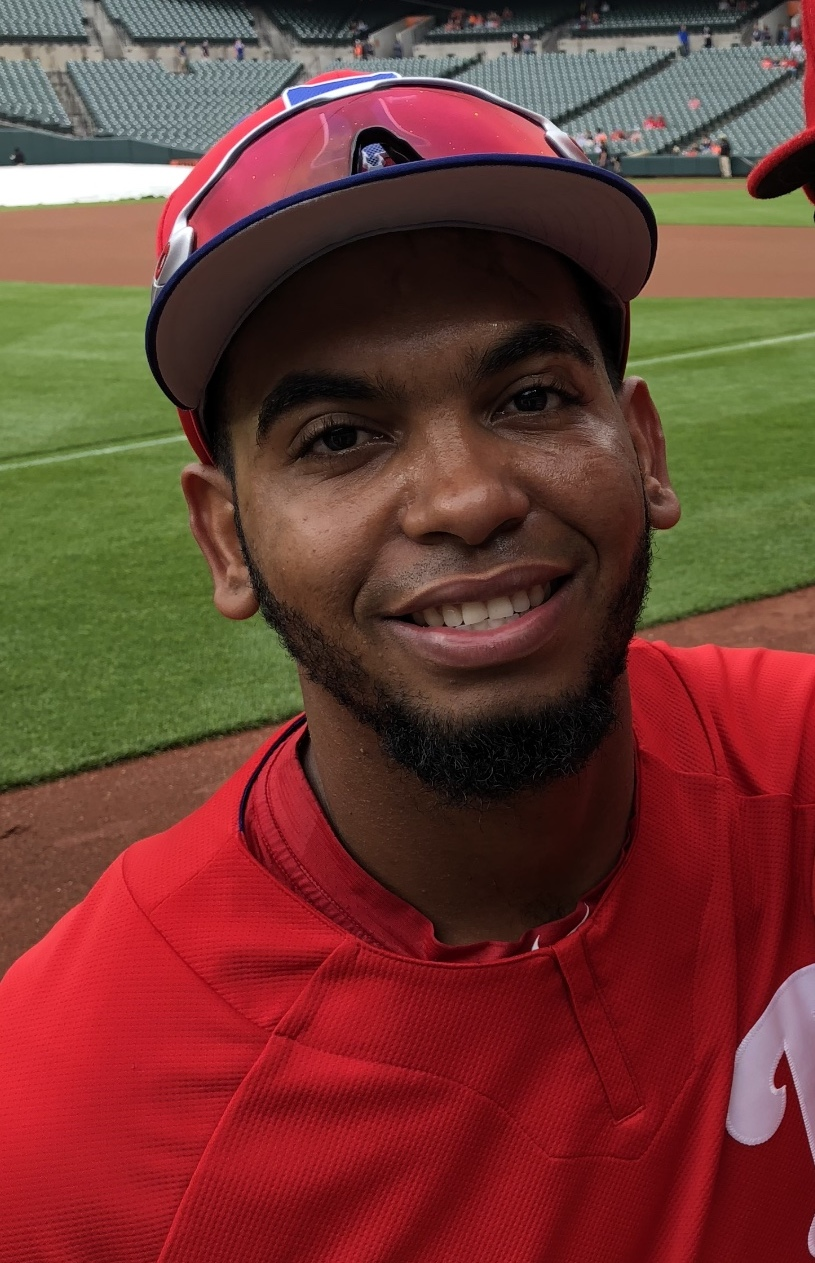
- Domínguez with the Phillies in 2018

Seattle Mariners – No. 58
- Pitcher
- Born: November 25, 1994 (age 31); Esperanza, Dominican Republic
- Bats: Right Throws: Right

MLB debut
- May 7, 2018, for the Philadelphia Phillies

MLB statistics (through 2026 season)
- Win–loss record: 28–26
- Earned run average: 3.52
- Strikeouts: 425
- Saves: 52
- Stats at Baseball Reference

Teams
- Philadelphia Phillies (2018–2019, 2021–2024); Baltimore Orioles (2024–2025); Toronto Blue Jays (2025); Chicago White Sox (2026); Seattle Mariners (2026–present)
Medals
Men's baseball
Representing Dominican Republic
World Baseball Classic
Bronze medal – third place	2026 Miami	Team

Seranthony Ambioris Domínguez Taveras (born November 25, 1994) is a Dominican professional baseball pitcher for the Seattle Mariners of Major League Baseball (MLB). He has previously played in MLB for the Philadelphia Phillies, Baltimore Orioles, Toronto Blue Jays, and Chicago White Sox.

Domínguez signed with the Phillies as an international free agent in 2011 and made his MLB debut in 2018. He underwent Tommy John surgery in 2020, then returned to pitch in the 2022 World Series. Philadelphia traded him to Baltimore during the 2024 season. He was dealt to Toronto during the 2025 season, with whom he won Game 1 of the World Series for the second time in his career. He signed as a free agent with the White Sox in 2026, then was dealt before the trade deadline to the Mariners.

Domínguez pitched for the Dominican Republic in the 2026 World Baseball Classic.

== Early life ==
Domínguez was born in Esperanza Valverde Mao, Dominican Republic. Of his unusual first name, Baseball America reported: "'I'm not sure where it comes from,' [he] said with a laugh. 'I think it’s something my parents heard on TV.'"

== Career ==
=== Philadelphia Phillies ===
==== Minor leagues ====
Domínguez signed with the Philadelphia Phillies as an international free agent in October 2011 for $25,000 (equivalent to $36,000 in 2025). He made his professional debut in 2012 with the Dominican Summer League (DSL) Phillies, going 4–4 with a 3.48 earned run average (ERA) and 40 strikeouts in 67 1/3 innings in 15 games (11 starts). In 2013, he returned to the DSL where he had a 4–6 record and 2.96 ERA, and 58 strikeouts in 76 innings, in 14 starts. He led the DSL with two shutouts and complete games. In 2014, he played for the rookie-level Gulf Coast League (GCL) Phillies, going 2–2 record with a 3.12 ERA and 24 strikeouts in 26 relief innings pitched.

Domínguez returned to the GCL in 2015, where he was 1–1 with a 2.35 ERA with 9 strikeouts in only 7 2/3 innings pitched. In 2016 he pitched for both the Low-A Williamsport Crosscutters and Single-A Lakewood BlueClaws. He had a combined 6–3 record and 2.34 ERA in 13 starts with 65 strikeouts in 65 1/3 innings.

In 2017, Domínguez pitched for the High-A Clearwater Threshers, and had a 4–4 record and 3.61 ERA with 75 strikeouts in 62 1/3 innings in 15 games (13 starts), averaging 10.8 strikeouts per nine innings (K/9). He was a 2017 Florida State League Mid-Season All Star. The Phillies added him to their 40-man roster after the season, to protect him from the Rule 5 draft. That off-season, the Phillies organization told him he was being converted into a relief pitcher.

Domínguez began 2018 with the Double-A Reading Fightin Phils, going 1–2 with a 2.08 ERA with 18 strikeouts in 13 innings in 8 games, averaging 12.5 K/9. He was promoted to the Triple-A Lehigh Valley IronPigs in late April and went 1–0 with a 0.00 ERA in three games. Between the two minor league teams, in 16 2/3 innings Domínguez gave up eight hits and two walks, and struck out 21 batters.

==== 2018: rookie season ====
The Phillies promoted Domínguez to the major leagues on May 7, 2018, and he made his MLB debut that night. He became the only major league reliever in recorded baseball history (dating back to 1908) to record at least two outs and allow no runs, hits, or walks in his first five major-league appearances. He also became the first pitcher in recorded history to not allow a run, hit, or walk in his first six appearances. He recorded his first career save against the St. Louis Cardinals on May 19, and his first win on May 26. Domínguez tied the all-time record for most perfect appearances (8) in a pitcher's first 11 games and pitched more innings in those games (10 1/3) than any of the other pitchers with whom he was tied. His 0.65 WHIP through the All-Star break (min. 30 IP) was the lowest ever by any Phillie.

In 2018 with the Phillies, Domínguez was 2–5 with 16 saves and a 2.95 ERA, and 74 strikeouts in 58 innings, averaging 11.5 K/9. Domínguez ranked in the top 25 in MLB (minimum 50 innings) in both strikeout rate and in ground-ball rate. He struck out 32% of batters, best among rookies with at least 55 innings pitched. He also limited all batters to a .156 batting average and 0.93 WHIP (each fourth-best among National League (NL) relievers with 50 or more innings pitched), and batters to a .163 batting average in “high-leverage” situations, as calculated by Baseball Reference. Batters had a 66.4% contact percentage against him, second-lowest in the NL among pitchers with at least 50 innings pitched. His 16 saves tied Jack Meyer (1955) for the most by any Phillies rookie reliever. Baseball America named him to its 2018 MLB All-Rookie Team, and he was named to Baseball Digest's Rookie All-Star team.

==== 2019–2023 ====
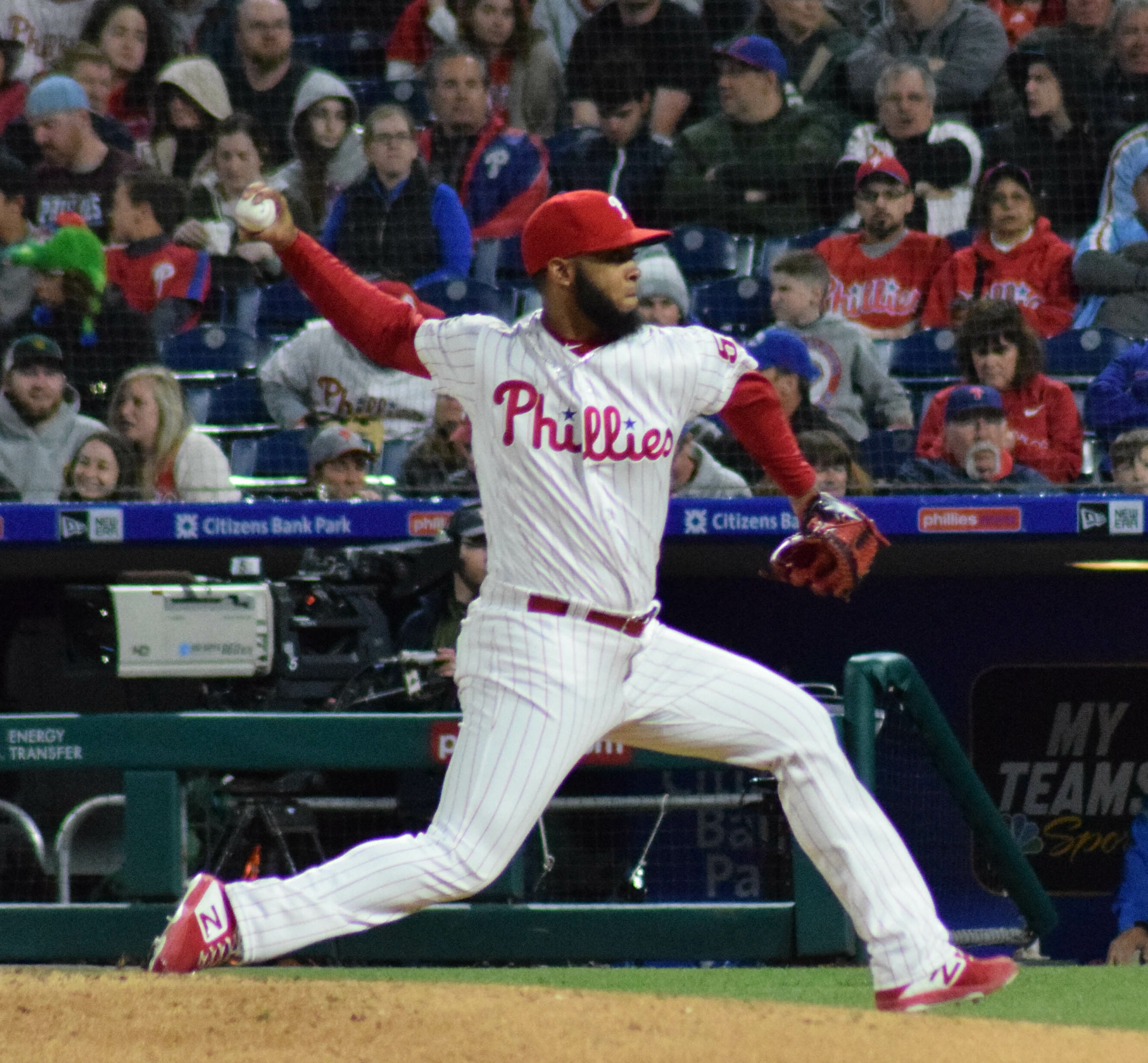
Domínguez pitching with the Phillies in 2019

In 2019, Domínguez was 3–0 with a 4.74 ERA in 24 2/3 innings over 27 relief appearances during which he struck out 29 batters, averaging 10.6 strikeouts per 9 innings. His season ended early with him on the injured list, due to a damaged ulnar collateral ligament in his right elbow.

Domínguez underwent Tommy John surgery on July 30, 2020, more than a year after he was initially placed on the injured list. On February 17, 2021, he was placed on the 60-day injured list as he continued to recover. On September 1, Domínguez was activated off the injured list. He returned to the majors in October, pitching one scoreless inning on October 3.

In the 2022 regular season, Domínguez was 6–5 with nine saves and a 3.00 ERA, as in 54 innings he struck out 61 batters over 54 relief appearances. He went on the injured list for three weeks with right triceps tendinitis. Domínguez earned the save in Game 3 of the NL Championship Series against the San Diego Padres. He earned the win in Game 1 of the World Series, throwing 1 2/3 scoreless innings. He pitched in nine games during the 2022 postseason, allowing two earned runs and striking out 18 hitters in 10 2/3 innings.

On February 16, 2023, Domínguez signed a two-year, $7.25 million contract extension with the Phillies. That season, he had a 3.78 ERA and struck out 48 batters in 50 innings and 57 appearances. He missed time in June and July due to an oblique strain. He made six appearances in the 2023 postseason, allowing no runs and striking out 7 hitters in 5 1/3 innings.

Domínguez made 38 appearances for Philadelphia in 2024, compiling a 4.75 ERA with 40 strikeouts across 36 innings. He was the second longest-tenured Phillie prior to being traded, with only Aaron Nola having been a Phillie for longer.

=== Baltimore Orioles ===
On July 26, 2024, Domínguez and outfielder Cristian Pache were traded to the Baltimore Orioles for outfielder Austin Hays. Domínguez made 25 appearances down the stretch for Baltimore, posting an 0–2 record and 3.97 ERA with 28 strikeouts and 10 saves across 22 2/3 innings pitched. He had two scoreless outings in the American League Wild Card Series.

Domínguez made 43 relief appearances for the Orioles to beging the 2025 season, compiling a 2–3 record and 3.24 ERA with 54 strikeouts and two saves across 41 2/3 innings pitched.

=== Toronto Blue Jays ===
On July 29, 2025, in between a doubleheader between the Orioles and Toronto Blue Jays, Domínguez and cash were traded to the Blue Jays for pitching prospect Juaron Watts-Brown. During the second game of the doubleheader, Domínguez tossed a scoreless inning against his former team. Domínguez pitched in 24 games for Toronto, logging a 2–1 record and 3.00 ERA with 25 strikeouts over 21 innings pitched. He gave up a go-ahead grand slam to Eugenio Suárez of the Seattle Mariners in Game 5 of the American League Championship Series. Domínguez went 2–0 in the postseason, winning Game 1 of the World Series but blowing a save in the seventh inning of the 18-inning Game 3.

=== Chicago White Sox ===
On January 29, 2026, Domínguez signed a two-year, $20 million contract with the Chicago White Sox. Domínguez made 43 appearances for the White Sox, compiling a 4–3 record and 3.99 ERA with 47 strikeouts and 12 saves across 38 1/3 innings pitched.

=== Seattle Mariners ===
On August 1, 2026, the White Sox traded Domínguez, Nolan Jones, and Boston Smith to the Seattle Mariners in exchange for Luis Castillo. Domínguez gave up two home runs and four runs in his first outing for the Mariners.

== International career ==
Domínguez pitched for the Dominican Republic national team in the 2026 World Baseball Classic. He was 1–0, pitching four scoreless innings in four games as his team finished third.

== Pitching style ==
Domínguez threw four pitches throughout the early half of his career: a four-seam fastball and a sinker, both of which reached up to 101 miles per hour (163 km/h); a slider that averaged 89 miles per hour (143 km/h) and had generated a whiff rate of above 50% since his debut in 2018; and a seldom-used changeup at 90–92 miles per hour (145–148 km/h). In 2025, he began throwing a sweeper instead of his slider and added a splitter and curveball to his arsenal, greatly improving his performance against left-handed hitters.

== Personal life ==
Domínguez and his wife have two sons.
