= Rhys Hoskins =

American baseball player (born 1993)

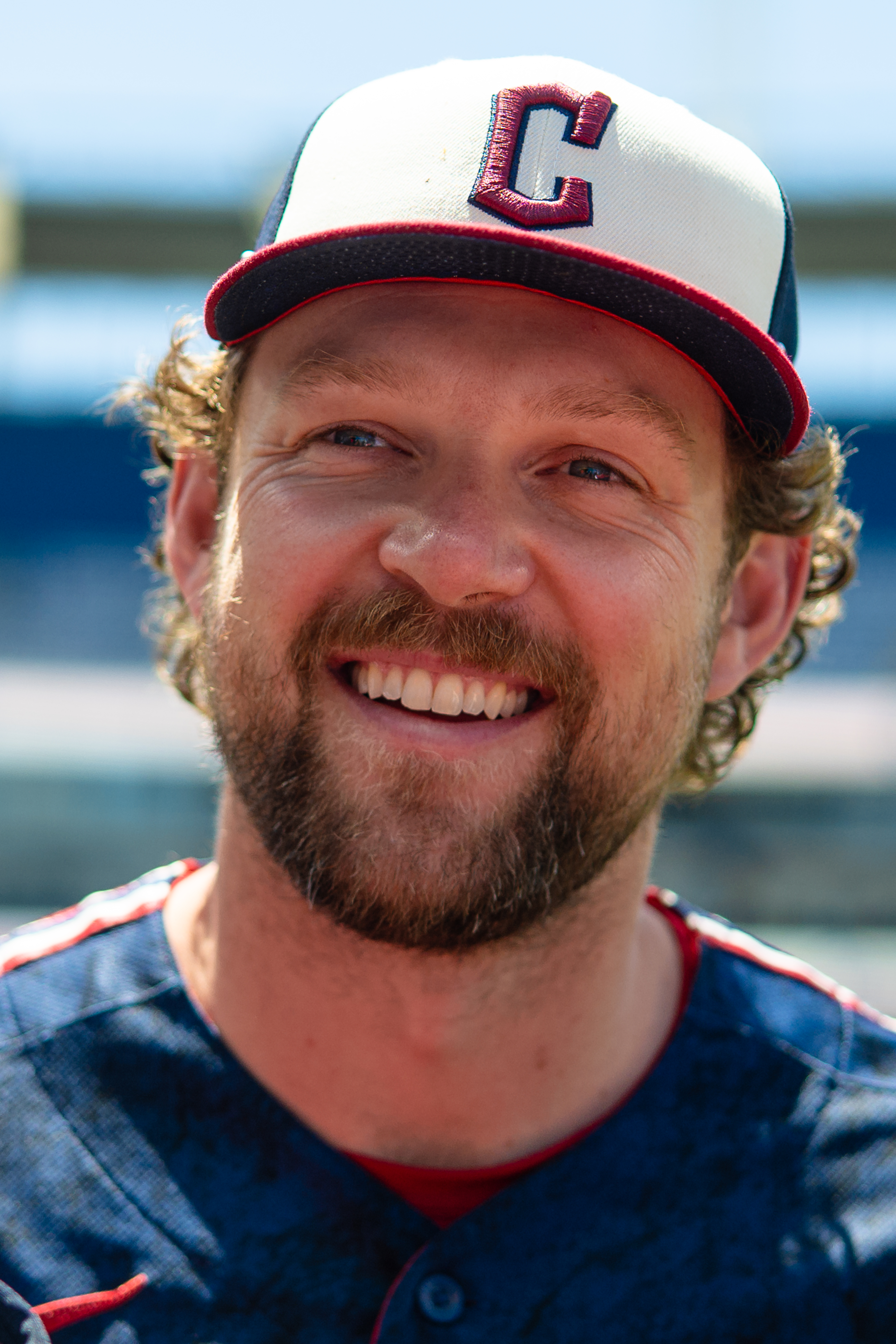
- Hoskins with the Cleveland Guardians in 2026

Free agent
- First baseman
- Born: March 17, 1993 (age 33); Sacramento, California, U.S.
- Bats: Right Throws: Right

MLB debut
- August 10, 2017, for the Philadelphia Phillies

MLB statistics (through 2026 season)
- Batting average: .233
- Home runs: 199
- Runs batted in: 568
- Stats at Baseball Reference

Teams
- Philadelphia Phillies (2017–2022); Milwaukee Brewers (2024–2025); Cleveland Guardians (2026)

Rhys Dean Hoskins (/riːs/ REESS; born March 17, 1993) is an American professional baseball first baseman who is a free agent. He has played in Major League Baseball (MLB) for the Philadelphia Phillies, Milwaukee Brewers and Cleveland Guardians.

Hoskins played college baseball for the Sacramento State Hornets, and was selected by the Phillies in the fifth round of the 2014 MLB draft. He made his MLB debut in 2017, and was the Phillies starting first baseman for parts of six seasons. He was an integral part of the Phillies reaching the World Series in 2022, before he suffered a torn ACL, missing the entire 2023 season. After becoming a free agent following the season, Hoskins signed with the Brewers for 2024.

== Early life ==
Hoskins was born on March 17, 1993, in Sacramento, California. His parents, Paul and Cathy Hoskins, were both lawyers. Hoskins was a competitive child, eager to win at card and board games as well as pickup games in the family's backyard. When he was two years old, his mother was diagnosed with breast cancer. She ultimately died of the disease in 2009, shortly before Hoskins' 16th birthday. After his mother's death, Hoskins grew closer to his younger sister Meloria. A lifelong fan of the San Francisco Giants of Major League Baseball (MLB), Hoskins modeled his baseball performance first after J. T. Snow, who had a background in gridiron football as well as playing first base, and later on Paul Goldschmidt.

Hoskins became a multi-sport athlete at Jesuit High School in Carmichael, California, playing baseball, basketball, and football while maintaining a 4.0 grade-point average. Hoskins' parents dissuaded him from focusing entirely on one sport, instead encouraging him to follow a variety of activities. One of Hoskins' teammates at Jesuit was Zach Green, a shortstop who was highly sought after in the 2012 MLB draft. Green typically batted third in the lineup, with Hoskins following at cleanup. Hoskins graduated high school in 2011, with a career .421 batting average, 28 runs batted in (RBIs), and a .544 on-base percentage.

== College career ==
Hoskins chose to pursue college baseball so that he could better develop the mental aspect of the game. He chose to attend California State University, Sacramento, the only college that offered him a scholarship, to play for the Sacramento State Hornets.

As a freshman he batted .353 with a .567 slugging percentage (both 2nd in the conference), with 10 home runs and 53 RBIs (3rd), and was named Western Athletic Conference Freshman of the Year, National Collegiate Baseball Writers Association First Team Freshman All-American, Baseball America First Team Freshman All-American, Louisville Slugger Freshman All-American (Collegiate Baseball Newspaper), All-WAC second team, and Academic All-WAC. In 2013, he played collegiate summer baseball with the Falmouth Commodores of the Cape Cod Baseball League, and was named a league all-star. As a junior he hit 12 home runs with 53 RBIs and a .573 slugging percentage (all leading the WAC), while batting .319, and was named WAC Player of the Year, Louisville Slugger Third Team All-American (Collegiate Baseball), Second Team All-West Region (ABCA/Rawlings), First Team All-WAC, and Academic All-WAC.

== Professional career ==
=== Philadelphia Phillies ===
==== Minor leagues ====
The Philadelphia Phillies selected Hoskins in the fifth round, 142nd overall, of the 2014 MLB draft, and he chose to sign with the team for a $349,700 signing bonus. Hoskins made his professional debut in 2014 with the Low-A Williamsport Crosscutters of the New York–Penn League. In 70 games with the team, he batted .237 with nine home runs, but his performance was inconsistent. The Phillies' department of player development sent Hoskins to the Florida Instructional League that September, where he developed his signature left leg kick batting stance.

Hoskins was assigned to the Single-A Lakewood BlueClaws of the South Atlantic League (SAL) to begin the 2015 season. That May, after batting .342 with two home runs and 23 RBI, the Phillies organization named Hoskins their Minor League Player of the Month. On June 23, Hoskins appeared in the SAL All-Star Game, going 1-for-3 with one run scored, and he finished second in the SAL Home Run Derby. Two days later, he and fellow BlueClaw All-Star Malquin Canelo were promoted to the High-A Clearwater Threshers of the Florida State League. On August 24, Hoskins was named the Florida State League Player of the Week, after putting up nine hits, including four doubles, one triple, and two home runs in seven games. Between the two teams, Hoskins batted .319 in 2015, with 17 home runs, 90 RBI, and 86 runs scored in 567 plate appearances. After the season ended, Hoskins asked the Phillies if there were any winter baseball leagues that he could play in, as he wanted to keep his momentum from the season. He was assigned to the Sydney Blue Sox of the Australian Baseball League, where he batted .323 with eight home runs and a .561 slugging percentage in 42 games.

After his time in Australia, Hoskins began 2016 with the Double-A Reading Fightin Phils of the Eastern League. He and teammate Dylan Cozens made an immediate impression in Reading; by mid-June, they had combined for 36 home runs, the second-highest total by a pair of teammates in all of professional baseball - only Mark Trumbo and Manny Machado of the Baltimore Orioles ranked higher. By August, they were the first Reading teammates to hit 30 or more home runs in a single season, and Hoskins' and Cozens' performance at the plate generated a newfound enthusiasm among Reading baseball fans, who turned out to games to watch the two hit. Hoskins batted .281 in 2016, with 38 home runs, 116 RBI, and 95 runs in 589 plate appearances. After the season, he was named the Eastern League Rookie of the Year, and received the Paul Owens Award alongside Cozens as the top players in the Phillies farm system.

Hoskins opened the 2017 season playing with the Lehigh Valley IronPigs of the Triple-A International League. Hoskins started at first base for Team USA in the All-Star Futures Game. In a Triple-A season cut short by his call-up, he led the International League in RBI (91), OPS (.966), on-base percentage (.385), and slugging percentage (.581), and ranked 2nd in runs (78), 3rd in home runs (29; setting the team's season record) and total bases (233), and 7th in batting average (.284) and walks (64). Hoskins was selected by the International League as its MVP, Rookie of the Year, and Midseason and Postseason All-Star Team first baseman, and was named Phillies Minor League Hitter of the Month for April. He was also selected by Baseball America as the first baseman on the First Team of the Baseball America Minor League All-Star Team and a Triple-A All-Star, and an MiLB.com Phillies Organization All Star.

==== 2017 ====
With regular outfielder Aaron Altherr injured, Hoskins began playing in left field with the IronPigs to prepare for a potential promotion to the major leagues. He was called up to the Phillies on August 10, 2017, with Cameron Perkins optioned to make room for Hoskins on the roster. He debuted the same day, going 0-for-2 with a walk in a 10–0 loss to the New York Mets. Manager Pete Mackanin moved Hoskins to the cleanup position after his first game, and on August 13, Hoskins had his first major league RBI and hit, in the first and fifth innings, respectively, of a 6–2 loss to the Mets. The next day, in a 7–4 loss to the San Diego Padres, Hoskins became the first Phillies player to hit his first two major league home runs in the same game since Scott Rolen in 1996.

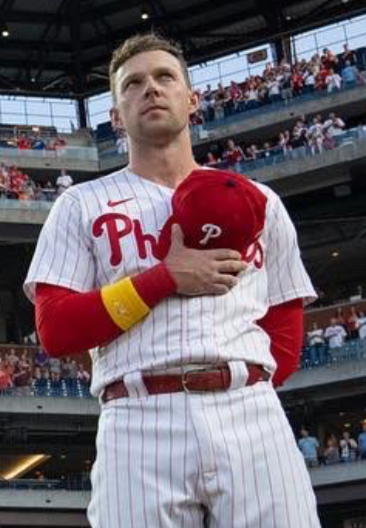
Hoskins in 2022

Hoskins broke a series of records for rookie production. On August 26, after hitting a home run in seven consecutive days, Hoskins became the fastest player in recorded MLB history to reach 10 career home runs, doing so in 17 games. His 11th home run came the following day, after only 64 at bats, breaking Shane Spencer and Gary Sanchez' records of 11 home runs in 81 at bats. Additionally, he passed former Phillies first baseman Ryan Howard's record of 10 home runs in one month by a Phillies rookie, and was the first to hit a home run in five consecutive games since Chase Utley in 2008. In the same game, Hoskins turned a triple play from the outfield, the first Phillies player to do so in 53 years.

On August 28, in his 19th career game, Hoskins recorded his 25th RBI in the second-fewest games since the statistic began being used in 1920. (in 1925, the Chicago Cubs' Mandy Brooks did so in 17 games.) In the same game, he hit a double and became the third rookie in franchise history to have extra-base hits in six consecutive games, joining Pinky Whitney in 1928 and Dick Allen in 1964. His 11 home runs in August were the most by a rookie in a month in Phillies history. Hoskins's record-breaking streak continued on September 2, when he became the fastest player to hit 12 home runs, doing so in only 24 games. Hoskins was named the NL Rookie of the Month in August.

Of his first 26 major league games, Hoskins played 20 in left field, even though he had played in the outfield only as a freshman during college and in only three minor league games. On September 12, Hoskins hit his 15th and 16th home runs, in 32 games. On September 13, he hit his 17th home run, in 33 games. He was the fastest player in history, in terms of games played, to hit his ninth through 17th career home runs.

On September 14, Hoskins hit his 18th home run, in 34 games with 118 at bats over 145 plate appearances. He was the fastest player to reach that many home runs in terms of games played in major league history. Five days later, he had four RBIs, for a total of 43 in his first 39 games, which was second only to Albert Pujols, who had 44 RBIs in his first 39 games; Joe DiMaggio had 42. He then hit his 45th RBI in his 41st game; the fastest player in MLB history to have 45 career RBIs (ahead of DiMaggio (43 games) and Ted Williams (44 games)).

To be considered a rookie in 2018, Hoskins would have had to have no more than 130 at bats (or no more than 50 innings for a pitcher) in 2017. He had his 131st at bat on September 18, which officially made 2017 his rookie year.

For the 2017 season with Philadelphia, he batted .259/.396/.618 with 18 home runs (the most by any player in major league history who made his season debut August 1 or later), 48 RBIs, and two stolen bases in 170 at bats. Hoskins had the highest slugging percentage (.911) and OPS (1.403) with runners in scoring position in major league baseball. He finished 4th in voting for NL Rookie of the Year.

==== 2018 ====
On June 27, 2018, Hoskins became the fastest player in Phillies' franchise history to reach 30 career home runs. He did so in 120 games, passing Hall of Fame outfielder Chuck Klein, who did so in 132 games. On July 3, Hoskins became the fastest Phillies player to reach 100 career RBIs. He did so in 124 games, a franchise record.

Despite not being named an All-Star, Hoskins was named as one of the eight participants in the MLB Home Run Derby. Hoskins entered the Home Run Derby as the 8th and final seed, with a matchup against the 1st seed Jesús Aguilar of the Milwaukee Brewers. Hoskins defeated Aguilar by a score of 17–12. His second round matchup was against Chicago Cubs outfielder Kyle Schwarber. Despite becoming the first player in MLB history to hit 20 home runs in a single round of the Home Run Derby, Hoskins was defeated by Schwarber 21–20 as Schwarber hit a walk-off home run as time expired.

On August 5, during his 151st career game, he became the fastest Phillie to reach 100 walks, surpassing Don Hurst. On September 18, Hoskins became the seventh-fastest major league player to hit 50 career home runs, doing so in his 192nd career game. Only Rudy York (153), Mark McGwire (161), Gary Sanchez (161), Ryan Braun (171), Aaron Judge (174), and Ryan Howard (182) reached 50 home runs more quickly.

For the season, Hoskins batted .246/.354/.496 with five stolen bases. Hoskins hit 34 home runs (tied for 7th in the NL) with 87 walks and 72 extra base hits (each 7th in the National League), 38 doubles (8th), and 96 RBIs (10th) and 16.4 at bats-per-home-run (each 10th). He led the NL in pitches/plate appearance (4.42), tied for 2nd in MLB with 18 go-ahead home runs (18), was third in the NL in home runs with two strikes (15), and had the highest fly ball percentage of all major league hitters (51.7%). On defense, he led NL left fielders in errors, with six, and had the lowest Defensive Runs Saved (DRS) rating of all NL left fielders, at -24.

In November 2018, Hoskins represented MLB in the 2018 MLB Japan All-Star Series.

==== 2019 ====
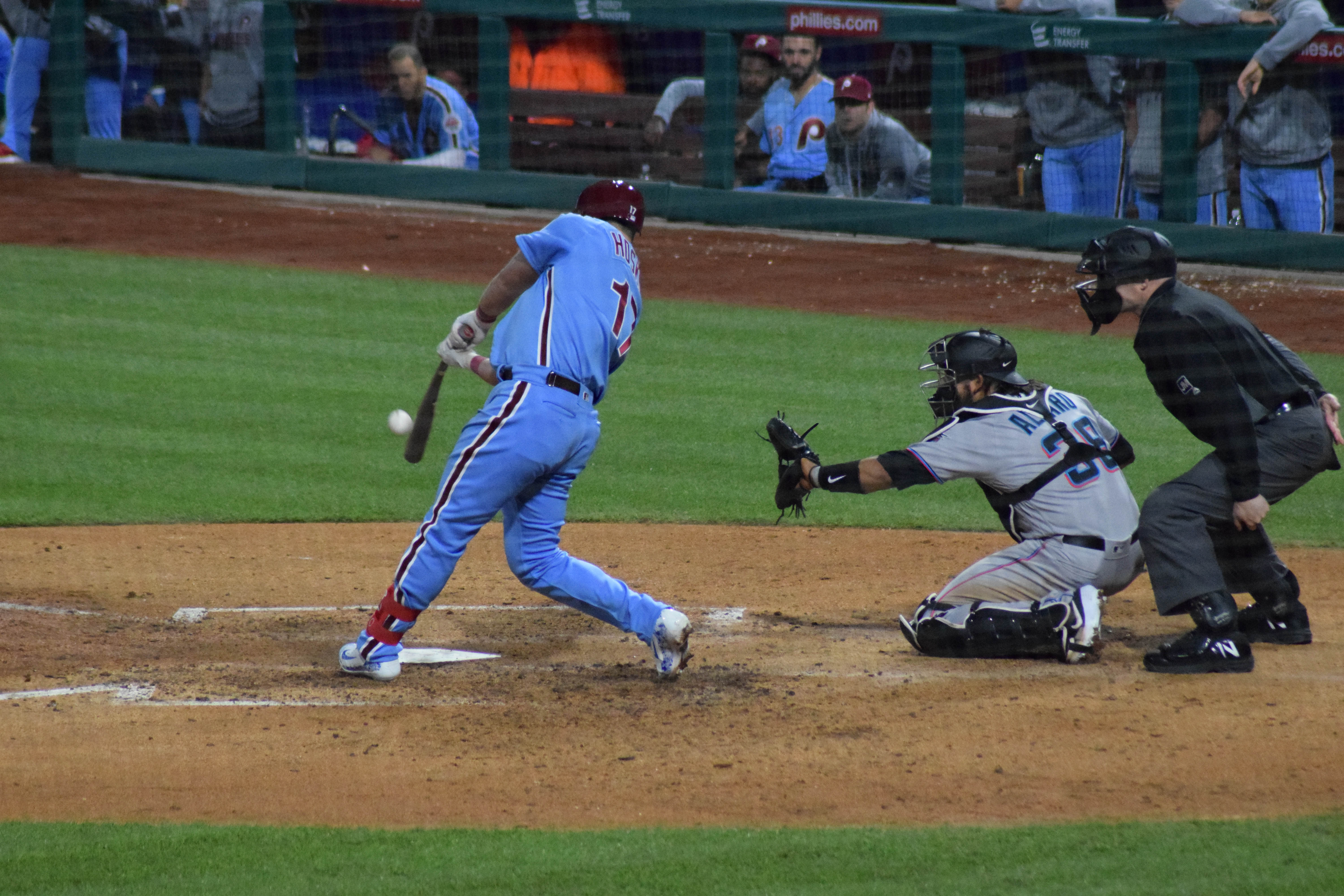
Rhys Hoskins connects with a pitch during a game in 2019

In 2019, Hoskins batted .226/.364/.454 in 160 games (5th in the National League) with 29 home runs, 85 RBIs, 6 sacrifice flies (8th in the NL), and a NL-leading 116 walks, and 173 strikeouts (6th) in 705 plate appearances (2nd) and 570 at bats. He again had the highest fly ball percentage in major league baseball, at 50.4%. On defense he moved to first base, where he played 158 games and his range factor of 8.32 was 5th-best in the league.

==== 2020 ====
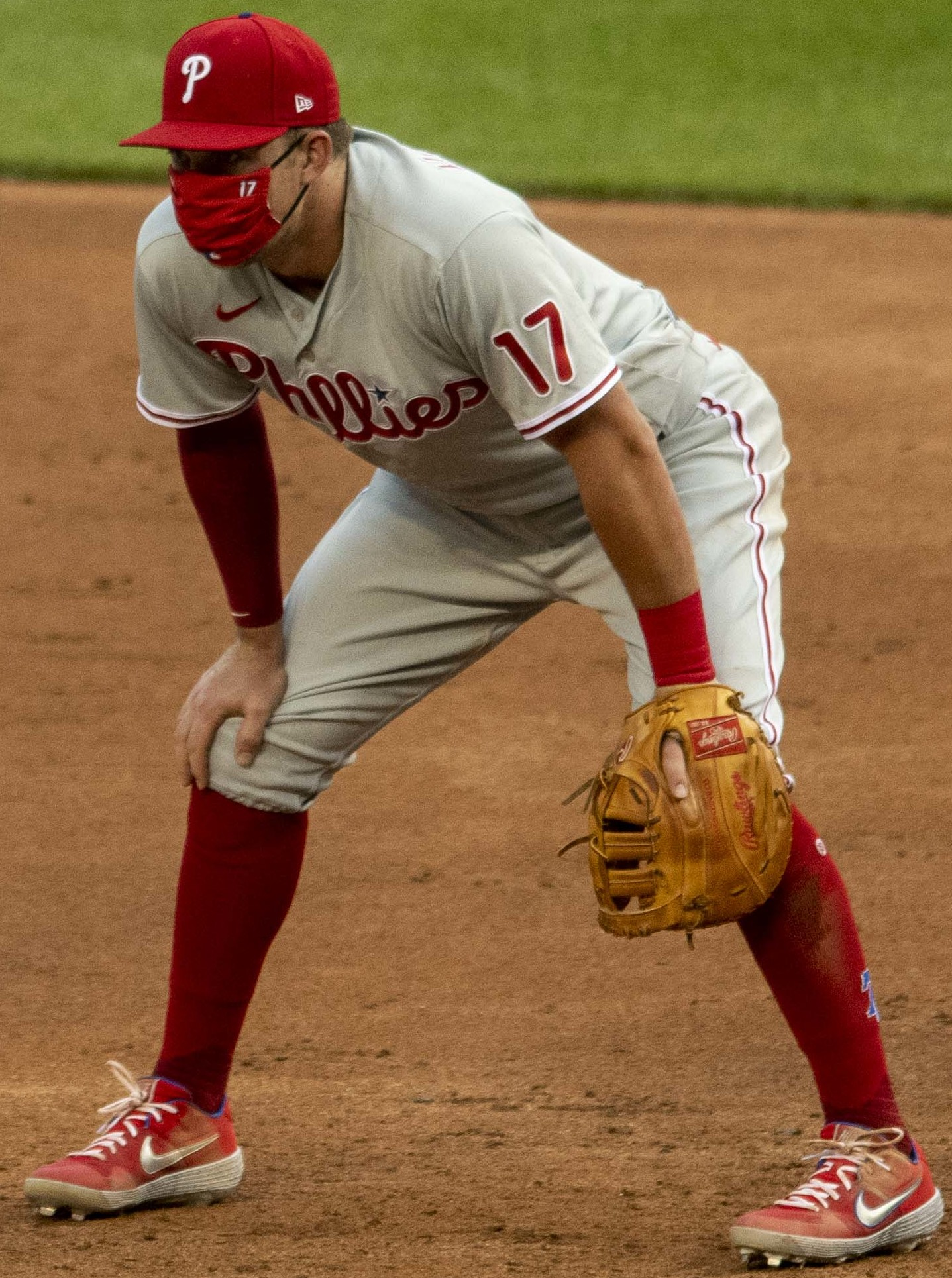
Hoskins in 2020

In the shortened 2020 season, Hoskins slashed .245/.384/.503 with 10 home runs and 26 RBI in 41 games for the Phillies. On October 2, 2020, Hoskins underwent Tommy John surgery on his left elbow.

==== 2021 ====
Hoskins sustained an abdominal tear during the course of the 2021 season. He was placed on the injured list due to a left groin strain on August 6. Hoskins's return from the groin injury was delayed. Shortly after feeling well enough to return, Hoskins aggravated the abdominal injury, and was placed back on the injured list, missing the remainder of the season. When his season ended, Hoskins was leading the Phillies with 27 home runs and 71 runs batted in, while hitting for a .247 batting average and .864 OPS across 107 games played.

==== 2022 ====
In the 2022 regular season, Hoskins batted .246/.332/.462 in 589 at bats (8th in the NL) with 81 runs, 33 doubles, 30 home runs, 79 RBIs, and 169 strikeouts (6th). He led the Phillies in at bats and doubles. The Houston Astros beat the Phillies in six games in the 2022 World Series.

==== 2023 ====
On January 13, 2023, Hoskins signed a one-year, $12 million contract with the Phillies, avoiding salary arbitration. In a March 23 spring training game against the Detroit Tigers, Hoskins backtracked a short-hop ground ball from Austin Meadows when he fell to the ground with a non-contact injury. After being carted off the field, the Phillies announced he had suffered a torn anterior cruciate ligament and would undergo surgery. On March 29, 2023, Hoskins was placed on the 60-day injury list in order to make room on the 40-man roster to add Cristian Pache, whom the Phillies acquired from the Oakland Athletics. He did not return to play during the season. Bryce Harper's move to first base in July precipitated the Phillies’ decision not to re-sign Hoskins, who became a free agent following the season.

=== Milwaukee Brewers ===
==== 2024 ====
On January 26, 2024, Hoskins signed a two-year, $34 million contract with the Milwaukee Brewers with a player opt-out after 2024 and a mutual option after 2025.

On June 3, 2024, he received a standing ovation prior to his first plate appearance in Philadelphia since the 2022 World Series. Hoskins hit a home run in his first game back in Philadelphia.

==== 2025 ====
Hoskins started the 2025 season slowly, but nearing the end of May he was on a multi-dozen game hot streak. That culminated in a rarely achieved .300/.402/.500 slash line. Hoskins credited this improvement to a mechanical change he made while batting, where he strode forward earlier before swinging.

However, Hoskins' June was far less successful. In July, Hoskins suffered a Grade 2 thumb sprain when tagging out Eric Wagaman. He was put on the 15-day injured list, and Andrew Vaughn was called up to take his place. The estimated recovery time was four to eight weeks. He made 90 total appearances for the Brewers during the regular season, slashing .237/.332/.416 with 12 home runs and 43 RBI. On November 4, 2025, the Brewers declined their side of a mutual option on Hoskins and made him a free agent.

=== Cleveland Guardians ===
On February 22, 2026, Hoskins signed a minor league contract with the Cleveland Guardians. On March 25, the Guardians selected Hoskins' contract after he made the team's Opening Day roster.

== Personal life ==
Hoskins married his longtime girlfriend, Jayme Bermudez, on November 9, 2019. Phillies teammate Scott Kingery served as one of the groomsmen. The couple raised over $1 million for the Muscular Dystrophy Association while he played in Philadelphia.
