= 2023 Philadelphia Phillies season =

Major League Baseball season

2023 Philadelphia Phillies
- National League Wild Card winners
- League: National League
- Division: East
- Ballpark: Citizens Bank Park
- City: Philadelphia
- Record: 90–72 (.556)
- Divisional place: 2nd
- Owners: John Middleton
- President of baseball operations: Dave Dombrowski
- Managers: Rob Thomson
- Television: NBC Sports Philadelphia; NBC Sports Philadelphia + NBC Philadelphia (Tom McCarthy, John Kruk, Ben Davis, Mike Schmidt, Rubén Amaro Jr.)
- Radio: Phillies Radio Network; WIP SportsRadio 94.1 FM (English) (Scott Franzke, Larry Andersen, Kevin Stocker); WTTM (Spanish) (Danny Martinez, Bill Kulik, Rickie Ricardo)
- Stats: ESPN.com; Baseball Reference

The 2023 Philadelphia Phillies season was the 141st season in the history of the franchise, and its 20th season at Citizens Bank Park. They entered the season as the defending National League champions and runners-up of the World Series. The Phillies drew an average home attendance of 38,157 in 80 home games in the 2023 MLB season, the sixth highest in the league.

On September 26, the Phillies clinched a playoff berth for the second consecutive season and they defeated their division rival Miami Marlins in the National League Wild Card Series in a two-game sweep. They then defeated their division rival Atlanta Braves in the National League Division Series in four games and advanced to the National League Championship Series where they were eliminated by the Arizona Diamondbacks in seven games.

== Offseason ==
=== Player transactions ===
==== Players becoming free agents ====
- Corey Knebel – Elected free agency on November 6, 2022.
- Chris Devenski – Agreed to a minor-league deal with the Los Angeles Angels on November 28, 2022.
- Kyle Gibson – Signed a one-year, $10 million contract with the Baltimore Orioles on December 5, 2022.
- David Robertson – Signed a one-year, $10 million contract with the New York Mets on December 9, 2022.
- Noah Syndergaard – Signed a one-year, $13 million contract with the Los Angeles Dodgers on December 16, 2022.
- Brad Hand – Elected free agency on November 6, 2022.
- Zach Eflin – Signed a three-year, $40 million contract with the Tampa Bay Rays on December 13, 2022.
- Jean Segura – Agreed to two-year, $17 million deal with the Miami Marlins on December 28, 2022.

==== Free agent acquisitions ====
The first major move from the Phillies came on December 8, 2022, when they signed shortstop Trea Turner to an eleven-year, $300 million contract.

After the blockbuster Turner deal, the Phillies spent the rest of December upgrading their pitching after losing several key pieces to free agency. On December 9, 2022, they signed left-hander Matt Strahm to a two-year, $15 million contract. A week later, they signed right-hander Taijuan Walker for four years on a $72 million contract.

- Jake Cave – Claimed off of waivers on December 2, 2022
- Trea Turner – Signed an 11-year, $300 million contract on December 8, 2022
- Matt Strahm – Signed a 2-year, $15 million contract on December 9, 2022
- Taijuan Walker – Signed a 4-year, $72 million contract on December 16, 2022
- Josh Harrison – Signed a 1-year, $2 million contract on January 30, 2023

==== Trade acquisitions ====
On January 7, 2023, the Phillies announced that they had traded outfielder Matt Vierling, utility player Nick Maton and catcher Donny Sands to the Detroit Tigers for relief pitcher Gregory Soto and infielder Kody Clemens.

On January 9, 2023, the Phillies acquired RHP Yunior Marte from the San Francisco Giants, trading away LHP Erik Miller.

== Regular season ==
=== National League East ===
NL East
Team	W	L	Pct.	GB	Home	Road
Atlanta Braves	104	58	.642	—	52‍–‍29	52‍–‍29
Philadelphia Phillies	90	72	.556	14	49‍–‍32	41‍–‍40
Miami Marlins	84	78	.519	20	46‍–‍35	38‍–‍43
New York Mets	75	87	.463	29	43‍–‍38	32‍–‍49
Washington Nationals	71	91	.438	33	34‍–‍47	37‍–‍44

=== National League playoff leaders ===
Division leaders
Team	W	L	Pct.
Atlanta Braves	104	58	.642
Los Angeles Dodgers	100	62	.617
Milwaukee Brewers	92	70	.568

Wild Card teams (Top 3 teams qualify for postseason)
Team	W	L	Pct.	GB
Philadelphia Phillies	90	72	.556	+6
Miami Marlins	84	78	.519	—
Arizona Diamondbacks	84	78	.519	—
Chicago Cubs	83	79	.512	1
San Diego Padres	82	80	.506	2
Cincinnati Reds	82	80	.506	2
San Francisco Giants	79	83	.488	5
Pittsburgh Pirates	76	86	.469	8
New York Mets	75	87	.463	9
St. Louis Cardinals	71	91	.438	13
Washington Nationals	71	91	.438	13
Colorado Rockies	59	103	.364	25

=== Record vs. opponents ===
==== Record vs. National League ====
2023 National League record Source: MLB Standings Grid – 2023
Team	AZ	ATL	CHC	CIN	COL	LAD	MIA	MIL	NYM	PHI	PIT	SD	SF	STL	WSH	AL
Arizona	—	3–3	6–1	3–4	10–3	5–8	2–4	4–2	1–6	3–4	4–2	7–6	7–6	3–3	5–1	21–25
Atlanta	3–3	—	4–2	5–1	7–0	4–3	9–4	5–1	10–3	8–5	4–3	3–4	4–2	4–2	8–5	26–20
Chicago	1–6	2–4	—	6–7	4–2	3–4	2–4	6–7	3–3	1–5	10–3	4–3	5–1	8–5	3–4	25–21
Cincinnati	4–3	1–5	7–6	—	4–2	4–2	3–3	3–10	4–2	3–4	5–8	3–3	3–4	6–7	4–3	28–18
Colorado	3–10	0–7	2–4	2–4	—	3–10	5–2	4–2	4–2	2–5	2–4	4–9	4–9	3–3	3–4	18–28
Los Angeles	8–5	3–4	4–3	2–4	10–3	—	3–3	5–1	3–3	4–2	4–3	9–4	7–6	4–3	4–2	30–16
Miami	4–2	4–9	4–2	3–3	2–5	3–3	—	3–4	4–8	7–6	5–2	2–4	3–3	3–4	11–2	26–20
Milwaukee	2–4	1–5	7–6	10–3	2–4	1–5	4–3	—	6–1	4–2	8–5	6–1	2–5	8–5	3–3	28–18
New York	6–1	3–10	3–3	2–4	2–4	3–3	8–4	1–6	—	6–7	3–3	3–3	4–3	4–3	7–6	19–27
Philadelphia	4–3	5–8	5–1	4–3	5–2	2–4	6–7	2–4	7–6	—	3–3	5–2	2–4	5–1	7–6	28–18
Pittsburgh	2–4	3–4	3–10	8–5	4–2	3–4	2–5	5–8	3–3	3–3	—	5–1	2–4	9–4	5–2	19–27
San Diego	6–7	4–3	3–4	3–3	9–4	4–9	4–2	1–6	3–3	2–5	1–5	—	8–5	3–3	3–3	28–18
San Francisco	6–7	2–4	1–5	4–3	9–4	6–7	3–3	5–2	3–4	4–2	4–2	5–8	—	6–1	1–5	20–26
St. Louis	3–3	2–4	5–8	7–6	3–3	3–4	4–3	5–8	3–4	1–5	4–9	3–3	1–6	—	4–2	23–23
Washington	1–5	5–8	4–3	3–4	4–3	2–4	2–11	3–3	6–7	6–7	2–5	3–3	5–1	2–4	—	23–23

Updated with the results of all games through October 1, 2023.

==== Record vs. American League ====
2023 National League record vs. American League Source: MLB Standings
Team	BAL	BOS	CWS	CLE	DET	HOU	KC	LAA	MIN	NYY	OAK	SEA	TB	TEX	TOR
Arizona	1–2	1–2	2–1	2–1	3–0	0–3	2–1	2–1	0–3	1–2	2–1	1–2	1–2	3–1	0–3
Atlanta	2–1	1–3	1–2	2–1	2–1	0–3	3–0	2–1	3–0	3–0	1–2	2–1	2–1	2–1	0–3
Chicago	2–1	1–2	3–1	1–2	2–1	0–3	2–1	0–3	1–2	2–1	3–0	2–1	2–1	2–1	2–1
Cincinnati	2–1	2–1	1–2	2–2	2–1	3–0	3–0	3–0	1–2	0–3	2–1	2–1	1–2	3–0	1–2
Colorado	1–2	2–1	2–1	2–1	1–2	1–3	2–1	2–1	1–2	2–1	1–2	0–3	0–3	0–3	1–2
Los Angeles	2–1	2–1	2–1	2–1	2–1	2–1	1–2	4–0	2–1	1–2	3–0	3–0	1–2	2–1	1–2
Miami	0–3	3–0	2–1	2–1	2–1	1–2	3–0	3–0	2–1	2–1	3–0	1–2	1–3	0–3	1–2
Milwaukee	2–1	1–2	3–0	2–1	1–2	2–1	3–0	2–1	2–2	2–1	0–3	3–0	1–2	3–0	1–2
New York	0–3	1–2	2–1	3–0	0–3	1–2	0–3	1–2	1–2	2–2	3–0	2–1	2–1	1–2	0–3
Philadelphia	2–1	1–2	2–1	1–2	3–0	2–1	2–1	2–1	1–2	1–2	3–0	2–1	3–0	0–3	3–1
Pittsburgh	1–2	3–0	2–1	1–2	2–2	1–2	3–0	1–2	1–2	1–2	1–2	1–2	0–3	1–2	0–3
San Diego	2–1	1–2	3–0	2–1	2–1	1–2	1–2	3–0	1–2	1–2	3–0	1–3	2–1	3–0	2–1
San Francisco	1–2	2–1	2–1	2–1	0–3	2–1	1–2	1–2	2–1	1–2	2–2	1–2	1–2	1–2	1–2
St. Louis	2–1	3–0	2–1	1–2	1–2	1–2	2–2	0–3	1–2	2–1	2–1	1–2	2–1	1–2	2–1
Washington	0–4	2–1	2–1	1–2	2–1	1–2	2–1	1–2	2–1	2–1	3–0	2–1	0–3	2–1	1–2

Updated with the results of all games through October 1, 2023.

=== Season summary ===
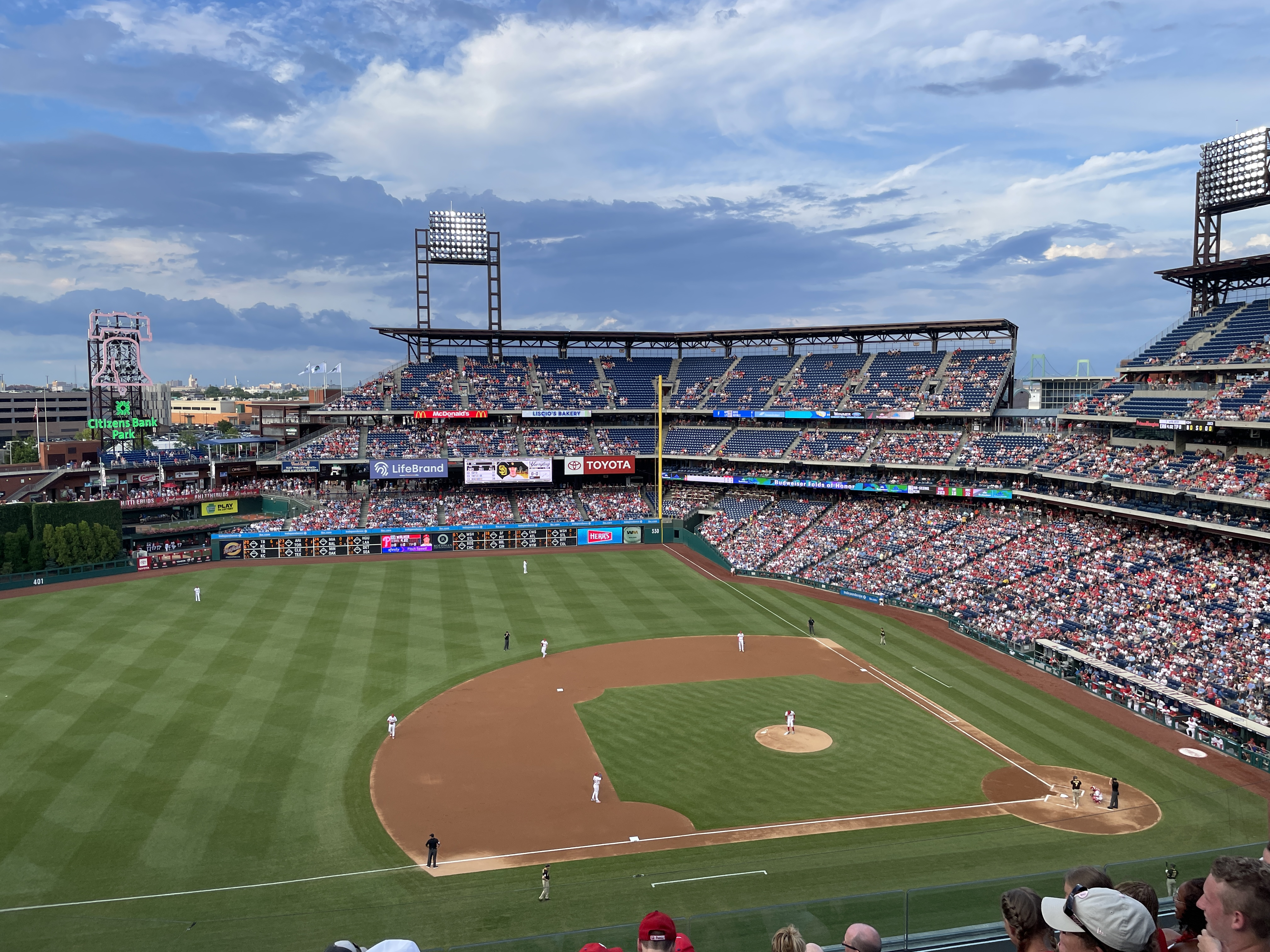
The Phillies take on the San Diego Padres at Citizens Bank Park on July 15. The Phillies won, 9–4.

==== April ====
Despite entering the year with high expectations after their world series run, the Phillies faltered early in Texas. Aaron Nola was unable to hold on to a 5–0 lead in game 1 (the start of a season-long struggle for the right-hander); the Phillies went on to lose 11–7. They were blown out 16–3 two days later before Texas finished off the sweep with a 2–1 win on Sunday Night Baseball, dropping the Phillies to 0–3. Visiting the New York Yankees the next day, April 3, Taijuan Walker struggled in his first Phillies start as the team remained winless with a 8–1 loss. The following day, however, Matt Strahm dominated in his first start for Philadelphia, and the bullpen held the game together earning the Phils their first win of the year by a score of 4–1. In the last game, Gerrit Cole outdueled Nola in a 4–2 loss. The Phillies were 1–5 after their first six games.

Their home opener against Cincinnati on April 6 was postponed a day due to rain, but it was worth the wait. In the first game at Citizens Bank Park since game 5 of the World Series, Zack Wheeler pitched well and Craig Kimbrel notched his first save of the season in a 5–2 win. A day later, the Phillies were held scoreless until the bottom of the 9th, when they exploded for 3 runs, capped off by a Bryson Stott walk-off single. Despite leading 4–3 going in to the top of the 9th on Easter Sunday, Seranthony Dominguez was unable to lock down the save, surrendering 3 runs as the Reds won 6–4. Against the Miami Marlins, the Phillies dominated game 1, tagging reigning Cy Young Award winner Sandy Alcantara for 9 runs in a 15–3 win in the first game of the series. However, they struggled in the next two; the Marlins won both and took the series, dropping Philadelphia to 4–8.

They traveled to Cincinnati the following day, where the struggles continued: Nick Lodolo shut them down in a 6–2 loss. They rebounded the next day with an 8–3 win before suffering a 13–0 defeat in the third game, Matt Strahm's first loss with the Phillies that dropped them to 5–10. They flipped the script in the last game of the series, though, scoring 9 runs in the first inning to back up Nola in a 14–3 win which salvaged a series split. They then beat the Chicago White Sox in a series that included Trea Turner's first Phillies homer before returning home to take on the Colorado Rockies.

The Rockies won the first game 5–0, but the Phils rebounded to take the last 3 and win the series. They again lost the first game of their next series to the Seattle Mariners, but once again, rebounded to win the series over the next two days.

To end April, the Phillies went back to Houston to play the Astros in a World Series rematch. Against all odds, they won the series, with Nola and Wheeler dominated in the first two games, capping off a 10–3 run and moving over .500 for the first time all season. They failed to complete the sweep, however, dropping the last game 4–3 on Sunday night. Still, they ended April with a 15–14 record and a 10–4 run in their last 14 games.

==== May ====
Following the loss to the Astros, the Phillies traveled to Los Angeles for a 3-game series with the Dodgers. They were blown out 13–4 in the first game; the biggest story of the day, however, was that Bryce Harper would be making his season debut the next day, just 6 months after undergoing Tommy John surgery to repair a torn UCL (an injury that he had suffered nearly a year earlier). It would be the quickest return from Tommy John surgery in Major League history. Harper did in fact debut in game 2 as the designated hitter; however, they could get little done on offense and were blown out for the second straight day, 13–1. The Phillies blew a 5–0 lead in the final game, with Max Muncy hitting a walk-off grand slam off of Kimbrel to complete the sweep and hand Philadelphia its 4th straight loss as they fell to 15–17.

After an off day, the Phillies returned home to face the Boston Red Sox. Their losing ways would continue, though, as they lost each of the first two games extending their losing streak to a season high 6. With a strong 6–1 win in game 3, they snapped the streak, and proceeded to sweep a 2-game set with Toronto and then take the first two of three over Colorado, capping off a 5 game winning streak with a 7–4 win. Just as quickly as they won 5 in a row, however, they dropped 5 straight. Colorado won the last game of the series 4–0; then, the Phillies got swept in San Francisco for the second straight year.

Returning home, the Chicago Cubs dominated them 10–1. They fell right back to 20–24. The Phils rebounded to win the next 2 games over Chicago, but faltered against the red-hot Arizona Diamondbacks, losing the first two games of that series. They salvaged the last game, though, coming back from a 5–0 deficit, forcing extra innings on a Trea Turner 2-run homer and winning the game in the 10th on an Alec Bohm double.

Traveling next to Atlanta for a 4-game series, the Braves won the first, but the Phillies came back and won the middle two games, highlighted by Craig Kimbrel's 400th save on May 26. Looking to Braves in Atlanta for the first time since 2019, waiver pickup Dylan Covey made his first Phillies start on Sunday Night Baseball, giving up 7 runs in the first inning as the Braves secured the split with an 11–4 victory. They had off on Memorial Day, but returned to action against the Mets for a 3-game series at Citi Field. Kodai Senga and Carlos Carrasco turned excellent starts for the Mets as the Phillies scored just 1 run in their last 2 games of May. New York took the series and Philadelphia ended a dismal 10–16 May with a record of 25–30.

==== June ====
The Phillies were swept by the Mets on June 1, dropping their 4th straight game and falling a season low 6 games under .500. They then suffered their 5th consecutive defeat the next day to the Nationals, 8–7, despite a comeback effort. They fell to 25–32, tied for last place in the NL with the Nats. The season looked bleak, but confidence remained high, especially after last year's tremendous run, and like 2022, the Phillies would not be down for long. They won the last 2 games in Washington, and then got fantastic performances from Nola, Taijuan Walker, and Wheeler in a sweep of the Detroit Tigers. Each pitcher took a no hitter into at least the 6th inning. Riding a 5-game winning streak, the Phils took on the Dodgers for the second and final time. In a back and forth game 1, Kyle Schwarber launched a walk-off solo homer to give the team its season high 6th straight win, and first over LA on the year. The streak came to an end the next day, as Nola and the offense struggled in a 9–0 loss. But, they took the series the following day with a 7–3 win, and flew to Arizona just 1 game under .500 (31–32).

== Roster ==
All players who made an appearance for the Phillies during 2023 are included.

2023 Philadelphia Phillies
Roster
Pitchers: 46 José Alvarado; 64 Andrew Bellatti; 75 Connor Brogdon; 54 Dylan Covey; 58 Seranthony Domínguez; 70 Bailey Falter; 68 Jeff Hoffman; 50 Orion Kerkering; 31 Craig Kimbrel; 22 Michael Lorenzen; 43 Yunior Marte; 79 McKinley Moore; 57 Nick Nelson; 27 Aaron Nola; 56 Luis Ortiz; 49 Michael Plassmeyer; 61 Cristopher Sánchez; 30 Gregory Soto; 25 Matt Strahm; 55 Ranger Suárez; 47 Erich Uelmen; 37 Andrew Vasquez; 99 Taijuan Walker; 45 Zack Wheeler	Catchers: 10 J. T. Realmuto; 21 Garrett Stubbs; Infielders: 28 Alec Bohm; 29 Rodolfo Castro; 23 Kody Clemens; 35 Drew Ellis; 24 Darick Hall; 3 Bryce Harper; 2 Josh Harrison; 33 Edmundo Sosa; 5 Bryson Stott; 7 Trea Turner	Outfielders: 8 Nick Castellanos; 44 Jake Cave; 18 Dalton Guthrie; 16 Brandon Marsh; 19 Cristian Pache; 18 Johan Rojas; 12 Kyle Schwarber; 37 Weston Wilson	Manager: 59 Rob Thomson; Coaches: 95 Mike Calitri (bench); 91 Jason Camilli (assistant hitting); 65 Caleb Cotham (pitching); 9 Bobby Dickerson (infield coach); 38 Paco Figueroa (first base coach); 97 Brad Flanders (bullpen catcher); 93 Brian Kaplan (assistant pitching); 53 Kevin Long (hitting); 94 David Lundquist (bullpen); 98 Hector Rabago (bullpen catcher); 62 Dusty Wathan (third base coach)

== Player statistics ==
= Indicates team leader

=== Batting ===
Note: G = Games played; AB = At bats; R = Runs; H = Hits; 2B = Doubles; 3B = Triples; HR = Home runs; RBI = Runs batted in; SB = Stolen bases; BB = Walks; AVG = Batting average; SLG = Slugging average

Player	G	AB	R	H	2B	3B	HR	RBI	SB	BB	AVG	SLG
Trea Turner	155	639	102	170	35	5	26	76	30	45	.266	.459
Nick Castellanos	157	626	79	170	37	2	29	106	11	36	.272	.476
Bryson Stott	151	585	78	164	32	2	15	62	31	39	.280	.419
Kyle Schwarber	160	585	108	115	19	1	47	104	0	126	.197	.474
Alec Bohm	145	558	74	153	31	0	20	97	4	42	.274	.437
J. T. Realmuto	135	489	70	123	28	5	20	63	16	38	.252	.452
Bryce Harper	126	457	84	134	29	1	21	72	11	80	.293	.499
Brandon Marsh	133	404	58	112	25	6	12	60	10	59	.277	.458
Edmundo Sosa	104	279	34	70	15	2	10	30	4	8	.251	.427
Jake Cave	65	184	18	39	8	1	5	21	3	15	.212	.348
Johan Rojas	59	149	24	45	9	2	2	23	14	5	.302	.430
Kody Clemens	47	139	15	32	7	0	4	13	0	8	.230	.367
Garrett Stubbs	41	113	15	23	4	1	1	12	2	9	.204	.283
Josh Harrison	40	103	8	21	3	0	2	10	0	3	.204	.291
Cristian Pache	48	84	12	20	7	1	2	11	2	10	.238	.417
Darick Hall	18	54	2	9	1	0	1	3	0	2	.167	.241
Rodolfo Castro	14	30	2	3	0	0	0	2	0	2	.100	.100
Dalton Guthrie	23	24	4	4	1	0	0	0	0	3	.167	.208
Drew Ellis	12	23	4	5	0	0	2	4	0	6	.217	.478
Weston Wilson	8	16	5	5	0	0	1	2	3	6	.313	.500
Totals	162	5541	796	1417	291	29	220	771	141	539	.256	.438
Rank in NL	—	2	4	4	4	6	3	4	3	10	4	3

Source:Baseball Reference

=== Pitching ===
Note: W = Wins; L = Losses; ERA = Earned run average; G = Games pitched; GS = Games started; SV = Saves; IP = innings pitched; H = Hits allowed; R = Runs allowed; ER = Earned runs allowed; BB = Walks allowed; SO = Strikeouts

Player	W	L	ERA	G	GS	SV	IP	H	R	ER	BB	SO
Aaron Nola	12	9	4.46	32	32	0	193.2	178	105	96	45	202
Zach Wheeler	13	6	3.61	32	32	0	192.0	168	82	77	39	212
Taijuan Walker	15	6	4.38	31	31	0	172.2	155	87	84	71	138
Ranger Suárez	4	6	4.18	22	22	0	125.0	129	59	58	48	119
Cristopher Sánchez	3	5	3.44	19	18	0	99.1	88	44	38	16	96
Matt Strahm	9	5	3.29	56	10	2	87.2	68	34	32	21	108
Craig Kimbrel	8	6	3.26	71	0	23	69.0	44	28	25	28	94
Gregory Soto	3	4	4.62	69	0	3	60.1	47	34	31	22	65
Jeff Hoffman	5	2	2.41	54	0	1	52.1	29	16	14	19	69
Seranthony Domínguez	5	5	3.78	57	0	2	50.0	48	25	21	22	48
Michael Lorenzen	4	2	5.51	11	7	1	47.1	49	32	29	20	28
José Alvarado	0	2	1.74	42	0	10	41.1	30	15	8	18	64
Bailey Falter	0	7	5.13	8	7	0	40.1	50	30	23	8	28
Andrew Vasquez	2	1	2.27	30	0	0	39.2	35	12	10	14	34
Yunior Marte	1	1	5.03	40	0	2	39.1	47	27	22	17	38
Dylan Covey	1	3	3.69	28	1	0	39.0	43	20	16	16	27
Connor Brogdon	2	1	4.03	27	1	0	29.0	29	14	13	13	26
Andrew Bellatti	1	0	5.11	27	0	0	24.2	25	15	14	12	25
Luis Ortiz	0	0	3.32	14	0	1	19.0	23	7	7	5	16
Nick Nelson	1	0	1.69	1	0	0	5.1	2	1	1	2	3
Michael Plassmeyer	0	1	22.09	1	1	0	3.2	8	10	9	0	4
McKinley Moore	0	0	18.90	3	0	0	3.1	5	7	7	5	2
Orion Kerkering	1	0	3.00	3	0	0	3.0	3	1	1	2	6
Kody Clemens	0	0	3.38	4	0	0	2.2	4	1	1	3	1
Josh Harrison	0	0	27.00	2	0	0	1.2	8	5	5	2	0
Erich Uelmen	0	0	36.00	1	0	0	1.0	3	4	4	2	1
Totals	90	72	4.03	162	162	45	1442.1	1318	715	646	470	1454
Rank in NL	4	12	4	—	—	6	3	4	4	4	3	3

Source:Baseball Reference

== Game log ==
=== Regular season ===
Legend
	Phillies win
	Phillies loss
	Postponement
	Clinched playoff spot
**Bold**	Phillies team member

2023 Game Log: 90–72 (Home: 49–32; Away: 41–40)
March/April: 15–14 (Home: 7–5; Away: 8–9)

#	Date	Opponent	Score	Win	Loss	Save	Attendance	Record
1	March 30	@ Rangers	7–11	Cole Ragans (1–0)	**Gregory Soto** (0–1)	—	38,387	0–1
2	April 1	@ Rangers	3–16	Nathan Eovaldi (1–0)	**Zack Wheeler** (0–1)	—	31,916	0–2
3	April 2	@ Rangers	1–2	Martín Pérez (1–0)	**Bailey Falter** (0–1)	Will Smith (1)	25,823	0–3
4	April 3	@ Yankees	1–8	Nestor Cortés Jr. (1–0)	**Taijuan Walker** (0–1)	—	37,202	0–4
5	April 4	@ Yankees	4–1	**Andrew Bellatti** (1–0)	Domingo Germán (0–1)	—	35,392	1–4
6	April 5	@ Yankees	2–4	Gerrit Cole (2–0)	**Aaron Nola** (0–1)	Clay Holmes (1)	35,847	1–5
–	April 6	Reds	Postponed (rain); Makeup: April 7					
7	April 7	Reds	5–2	**Gregory Soto** (1–1)	Derek Law (0–1)	**Craig Kimbrel** (1)	44,365	2–5
8	April 8	Reds	3–2	**Andrew Vasquez** (1–0)	Alexis Díaz (0–1)	—	44,526	3–5
9	April 9	Reds	4–6	Kevin Herget (1–0)	**Seranthony Domínguez** (0–1)	Ian Gibaut (1)	39,129	3–6
10	April 10	Marlins	15–3	**Matt Strahm** (1–0)	Sandy Alcántara (1–1)	—	28,642	4–6
11	April 11	Marlins	4–8	Jesús Luzardo (2–0)	**Aaron Nola** (0–2)	—	43,444	4–7
12	April 12	Marlins	2–3 (10)	A. J. Puk (1–0)	**Gregory Soto** (1–2)	—	29,584	4–8
13	April 13	@ Reds	2–6	Nick Lodolo (2–0)	**Bailey Falter** (0–2)	Alexis Díaz (2)	12,170	4–9
14	April 14	@ Reds	8–3	**Taijuan Walker** (1–1)	Connor Overton (0–1)	—	17,610	5–9
15	April 15	@ Reds	0–13	Graham Ashcraft (2–0)	**Matt Strahm** (1–1)	—	25,860	5–10
16	April 16	@ Reds	14–3	**Aaron Nola** (1–2)	Luis Cessa (0–2)	—	13,115	6–10
—	April 17	@ White Sox	Postponed (high winds and cold temperatures); Makeup: April 18 as a straight doubleheader					
17	April 18 (1)	@ White Sox	7–4	**Zack Wheeler** (1–1)	Lance Lynn (0–2)	**José Alvarado** (1)	see 2nd game	7–10
18	April 18 (2)	@ White Sox	0–3	Lucas Giolito (1–1)	**Bailey Falter** (0–3)	Reynaldo López (3)	12,542	7–11
19	April 19	@ White Sox	5–2	**Taijuan Walker** (2–1)	Mike Clevinger (2–1)	**José Alvarado** (2)	10,149	8–11
20	April 20	Rockies	0–5	Ryan Feltner (1–2)	**Matt Strahm** (1–2)	—	35,062	8–12
21	April 21	Rockies	4–3	**Seranthony Domínguez** (1–1)	Brad Hand (0–1)	**José Alvarado** (3)	43,261	9–12
22	April 22	Rockies	4–3	**Connor Brogdon** (1–0)	Kyle Freeland (2–2)	**Craig Kimbrel** (2)	41,939	10–12
23	April 23	Rockies	9–3	**Zack Wheeler** (2–1)	José Ureña (0–4)	—	44,618	11–12
24	April 25	Mariners	3–5	Marco Gonzales (2–0)	**Bailey Falter** (0–4)	Paul Sewald (7)	42,323	11–13
25	April 26	Mariners	6–5	**Craig Kimbrel** (1–0)	Justin Topa (0–2)	**José Alvarado** (4)	32,641	12–13
26	April 27	Mariners	1–0	**Matt Strahm** (2–2)	George Kirby (2–2)	**Craig Kimbrel** (3)	31,543	13–13
27	April 28	@ Astros	3–1	**Aaron Nola** (2–2)	Framber Valdez (2–3)	**José Alvarado** (5)	40,719	14–13
28	April 29	@ Astros	6–1	**Zack Wheeler** (3–1)	Cristian Javier (2–1)	—	41,240	15–13
29	April 30	@ Astros	3–4	José Urquidy (2–2)	**Bailey Falter** (0–5)	Ryan Pressly (3)	41,669	15–14

May: 10–16 (Home: 6–5; Away: 4–11)

#	Date	Opponent	Score	Win	Loss	Save	Attendance	Record
30	May 1	@ Dodgers	4–13	Victor González (1–0)	**Taijuan Walker** (2–2)	—	42,137	15–15
31	May 2	@ Dodgers	1–13	Julio Urías (4–3)	**Matt Strahm** (2–3)	—	42,780	15–16
32	May 3	@ Dodgers	6–10	Brusdar Graterol (1–1)	**Craig Kimbrel** (1–1)	—	36,539	15–17
33	May 5	Red Sox	3–5	Chris Sale (3–2)	**Zack Wheeler** (3–2)	Kenley Jansen (7)	43,322	15–18
34	May 6	Red Sox	4–7	Corey Kluber (2–4)	**Bailey Falter** (0–6)	Kenley Jansen (8)	43,832	15–19
35	May 7	Red Sox	6–1	**Taijuan Walker** (3–2)	Tanner Houck (3–2)	**Matt Strahm** (1)	44,669	16–19
36	May 9	Blue Jays	8–4	**Aaron Nola** (3–2)	Alek Manoah (1–3)	—	44,544	17–19
37	May 10	Blue Jays	2–1 (10)	**Craig Kimbrel** (2–1)	Tim Mayza (1–1)	—	31,758	18–19
38	May 12	@ Rockies	6–3	**Matt Strahm** (3–3)	Justin Lawrence (1–2)	**Craig Kimbrel** (4)	32,038	19–19
39	May 13	@ Rockies	7–4	**Connor Brogdon** (2–0)	Ryan Feltner (2–3)	**Gregory Soto** (1)	34,006	20–19
40	May 14	@ Rockies	0–4	Kyle Freeland (4–4)	**Aaron Nola** (3–3)	—	30,325	20–20
41	May 15	@ Giants	3–6	Scott Alexander (3–0)	**Bailey Falter** (0–7)	Camilo Doval (9)	23,819	20–21
42	May 16	@ Giants	3–4	Taylor Rogers (1–2)	**Zack Wheeler** (3–3)	Camilo Doval (10)	24,304	20–22
43	May 17	@ Giants	4–7	John Brebbia (2–0)	**Gregory Soto** (1–3)	Camilo Doval (11)	25,303	20–23
44	May 19	Cubs	1–10	Marcus Stroman (3–4)	**Ranger Suárez** (0–1)	—	42,110	20–24
45	May 20	Cubs	12–3	**Aaron Nola** (4–3)	Jameson Taillon (0–3)	—	42,508	21–24
46	May 21	Cubs	2–1	**Matt Strahm** (4–3)	Adbert Alzolay (1–3)	**Craig Kimbrel** (5)	44,108	22–24
47	May 22	Diamondbacks	3–6	Tommy Henry (2–1)	**Zack Wheeler** (3–4)	Andrew Chafin (7)	34,040	22–25
48	May 23	Diamondbacks	3–4	Miguel Castro (3–1)	**Seranthony Domínguez** (1–2)	—	33,420	22–26
49	May 24	Diamondbacks	6–5 (10)	**Craig Kimbrel** (3–1)	José Ruiz (1–1)	—	41,544	23–26
50	May 25	@ Braves	5–8	Nick Anderson (3–0)	**Gregory Soto** (1–4)	Raisel Iglesias (4)	43,216	23–27
51	May 26	@ Braves	6–4	**Taijuan Walker** (4–2)	Joe Jiménez (0–1)	**Craig Kimbrel** (6)	40,533	24–27
52	May 27	@ Braves	2–1	**Zack Wheeler** (4–4)	Charlie Morton (5–5)	**Craig Kimbrel** (7)	42,665	25–27
53	May 28	@ Braves	4–11	Spencer Strider (5–2)	**Dylan Covey** (0–1)	—	43,109	25–28
54	May 30	@ Mets	0–2	Kodai Senga (5–3)	**Ranger Suárez** (0–2)	David Robertson (9)	36,236	25–29
55	May 31	@ Mets	1–4	Carlos Carrasco (2–2)	**Aaron Nola** (4–4)	David Robertson (10)	39,641	25–30

June: 18–8 (Home: 7–5; Away: 11–3)

#	Date	Opponent	Score	Win	Loss	Save	Attendance	Record
56	June 1	@ Mets	2–4	Max Scherzer (5–2)	**Taijuan Walker** (4–3)	Drew Smith (2)	38,302	25–31
57	June 2	@ Nationals	7–8	Kyle Finnegan (3–2)	**Connor Brogdon** (2–1)	—	29,827	25–32
58	June 3	@ Nationals	4–2	**Dylan Covey** (1–1)	MacKenzie Gore (3–4)	**Craig Kimbrel** (8)	30,959	26–32
59	June 4	@ Nationals	11–3	**Ranger Suárez** (1–2)	Trevor Williams (2–4)	—	29,546	27–32
60	June 5	Tigers	8–3	**Aaron Nola** (5–4)	Joey Wentz (1–6)	—	33,196	28–32
61	June 6	Tigers	1–0	**Taijuan Walker** (5–3)	Tyler Alexander (1–1)	**Craig Kimbrel** (9)	36,664	29–32
—	June 7	Tigers	Postponed (Air quality/Smoke); Makeup: June 8					
62	June 8	Tigers	3–2	**Craig Kimbrel** (4–1)	Alex Lange (3–2)	—	29,028	30–32
63	June 9	Dodgers	5–4	**Gregory Soto** (2–4)	Caleb Ferguson (3–2)	—	42,364	31–32
64	June 10	Dodgers	0–9	Bobby Miller (3–0)	**Aaron Nola** (5–5)	Andre Jackson (2)	44,385	31–33
65	June 11	Dodgers	7–3	**Taijuan Walker** (6–3)	Caleb Ferguson (3–3)	—	44,287	32–33
66	June 12	@ Diamondbacks	8–9	Drey Jameson (3–1)	**Dylan Covey** (1–2)	Miguel Castro (7)	18,432	32–34
67	June 13	@ Diamondbacks	15–3	**Zack Wheeler** (5–4)	Zach Davies (1–2)	**Luis Ortiz** (1)	20,186	33–34
68	June 14	@ Diamondbacks	4–3 (10)	**Craig Kimbrel** (5–1)	Scott McGough (0–5)	**José Alvarado** (6)	20,286	34–34
69	June 15	@ Diamondbacks	5–4	**Aaron Nola** (6–5)	Ryne Nelson (3–4)	**Craig Kimbrel** (10)	23,032	35–34
70	June 16	@ Athletics	6–1	**Taijuan Walker** (7–3)	JP Sears (1–4)	—	16,084	36–34
71	June 17	@ Athletics	3–2 (12)	**Andrew Vasquez** (2–0)	Ken Waldichuk (1–5)	**Jeff Hoffman** (1)	12,015	37–34
72	June 18	@ Athletics	3–2	**Zack Wheeler** (6–4)	Hogan Harris (2–1)	**Yunior Marte** (1)	24,326	38–34
73	June 20	Braves	2–4	Spencer Strider (8–2)	**Jeff Hoffman** (0–1)	Raisel Iglesias (10)	37,746	38–35
—	June 21	Braves	Postponed (inclement weather); Makeup: September 11 as a split doubleheader					
74	June 22	Braves	1–5 (10)	Raisel Iglesias (3–2)	**Yunior Marte** (0–1)	—	39,570	38–36
75	June 23	Mets	5–1	**Taijuan Walker** (8–3)	Kodai Senga (6–5)	—	35,093	39–36
76	June 24	Mets	2–4	Max Scherzer (7–2)	**Cristopher Sánchez** (0–1)	David Robertson (11)	43,586	39–37
77	June 25	Mets	7–6	**Jeff Hoffman** (1–1)	Jeff Brigham (0–2)	**Craig Kimbrel** (11)	42,901	40–37
78	June 27	@ Cubs	5–1	**Ranger Suárez** (2–2)	Jameson Taillon (2–6)	—	37,072	41–37
79	June 28	@ Cubs	8–5	**Aaron Nola** (7–5)	Drew Smyly (7–5)	—	32,379	42–37
80	June 29	@ Cubs	3–1	**Taijuan Walker** (9–3)	Kyle Hendricks (3–3)	**Craig Kimbrel** (12)	35,090	43–37
81	June 30	Nationals	1–2	Josiah Gray (6–6)	**Cristopher Sánchez** (0–2)	Hunter Harvey (7)	44,261	43–38

July: 14–11 (Home: 7–5; Away: 7–6)

#	Date	Opponent	Score	Win	Loss	Save	Attendance	Record
82	July 1	Nationals	19–4	**Zack Wheeler** (7–4)	MacKenzie Gore (4–7)	—	42,784	44–38
83	July 2	Nationals	4–5	Trevor Williams (5–4)	**Ranger Suárez** (2–3)	Hunter Harvey (8)	41,531	44–39
84	July 4	@ Rays	3–1	**Aaron Nola** (8–5)	Zach Eflin (9–4)	**Craig Kimbrel** (13)	22,665	45–39
85	July 5	@ Rays	8–4	**Taijuan Walker** (10–3)	Yonny Chirinos (4–4)	—	18,208	46–39
86	July 6	@ Rays	3–1 (11)	**Matt Strahm** (5–3)	Ryan Thompson (1–2)	—	17,060	47–39
87	July 7	@ Marlins	4–3	**Jeff Hoffman** (2–1)	A. J. Puk (4–3)	**Craig Kimbrel** (14)	13,850	48–39
88	July 8	@ Marlins	3–5	Braxton Garrett (5–2)	**Ranger Suárez** (2–4)	A. J. Puk (15)	18,132	48–40
89	July 9	@ Marlins	3–7	Jesús Luzardo (8–5)	**Aaron Nola** (8–6)	—	21,159	48–41
–	July 11	**2023 Major League Baseball All-Star Game at T-Mobile Park in Seattle**						
90	July 14	Padres	3–8	Yu Darvish (6–6)	**Cristopher Sánchez** (0–3)	Josh Hader (22)	44,028	48–42
91	July 15 (1)	Padres	6–4	**Matt Strahm** (6–3)	Tim Hill (1–3)	**Craig Kimbrel** (15)	43,712	49–42
92	July 15 (2)	Padres	9–4	**Taijuan Walker** (11–3)	Ryan Weathers (1–6)	—	33,132	50–42
93	July 16	Padres	7–6 (12)	**Jeff Hoffman** (3–1)	Tim Hill (1–4)	—	37,204	51–42
94	July 18	Brewers	4–3	**Aaron Nola** (9–6)	Julio Teherán (2–4)	**Craig Kimbrel** (16)	35,302	52–42
95	July 19	Brewers	3–5	Hoby Milner (2–0)	**Jeff Hoffman** (3–2)	Devin Williams (24)	33,753	52–43
96	July 20	Brewers	0–4	Corbin Burnes (9–5)	**Taijuan Walker** (11–4)	—	38,276	52–44
97	July 21	@ Guardians	5–6	Trevor Stephan (5–4)	**Ranger Suárez** (2–5)	Emmanuel Clase (26)	38,260	52–45
98	July 22	@ Guardians	0–1	Tanner Bibee (6–2)	**Zack Wheeler** (7–5)	Emmanuel Clase (27)	37,937	52–46
99	July 23	@ Guardians	8–5 (10)	**Craig Kimbrel** (6–1)	Tim Herrin (1–1)	**Yunior Marte** (2)	31,806	53–46
100	July 24	Orioles	2–3	Bryan Baker (4–3)	**Craig Kimbrel** (6–2)	Cionel Pérez (1)	44,043	53–47
101	July 25	Orioles	4–3	**Yunior Marte** (1–1)	Yennier Canó (1–2)	—	37,200	54–47
102	July 26	Orioles	6–4	**Seranthony Domínguez** (2–2)	Kyle Bradish (6–6)	**Gregory Soto** (2)	40,235	55–47
103	July 28	@ Pirates	2–1	**Zack Wheeler** (8–5)	Mitch Keller (9–7)	**Craig Kimbrel** (17)	34,202	56–47
104	July 29	@ Pirates	6–7	Quinn Priester (2–1)	**Aaron Nola** (9–7)	David Bednar (21)	38,434	56–48
105	July 30	@ Pirates	4–6 (10)	Ángel Perdomo (2–1)	**Andrew Vasquez** (2–1)	—	34,515	56–49
106	July 31	@ Marlins	4–2	**Taijuan Walker** (12–4)	Tanner Scott (4–4)	**Craig Kimbrel** (18)	9,808	57–49

August: 17–10 (Home: 13–6; Away: 4–4)

#	Date	Opponent	Score	Win	Loss	Save	Attendance	Record
107	August 1	@ Marlins	3–1	**Gregory Soto** (3–4)	David Robertson (4–3)	**Seranthony Domínguez** (1)	9,600	58–49
108	August 2	@ Marlins	8–9 (12)	Tanner Scott (5–4)	**Dylan Covey** (1–3)	—	12,669	58–50
109	August 3	@ Marlins	4–2	**Michael Lorenzen** (6–7)	Johnny Cueto (0–3)	**Seranthony Domínguez** (2)	16,709	59–50
110	August 4	Royals	5–7	Jordan Lyles (3–12)	**Aaron Nola** (9–8)	Austin Cox (1)	36,510	59–51
111	August 5	Royals	9–6	**Matt Strahm** (7–3)	Ángel Zerpa (0–1)	**Craig Kimbrel** (19)	42,326	60–51
112	August 6	Royals	8–4	**Taijuan Walker** (13–4)	Zack Greinke (1–12)	—	43,112	61–51
—	August 7	Nationals	Postponed (rain); Makeup: August 8 as a straight doubleheader					
113	August 8 (1)	Nationals	8–4	**Zack Wheeler** (9–5)	Trevor Williams (5–7)	—	see 2nd game	62–51
114	August 8 (2)	Nationals	4–5	Jordan Weems (3–0)	**Craig Kimbrel** (6–3)	Kyle Finnegan (18)	40,264	62–52
115	August 9	Nationals	7–0	**Michael Lorenzen** (7–7)	MacKenzie Gore (6–9)	—	30,406	63–52
116	August 10	Nationals	6–2	**Matt Strahm** (8–3)	Andrés Machado (3–1)	—	30,113	64–52
117	August 11	Twins	13–2	**Cristopher Sánchez** (1–3)	Dallas Keuchel (0–1)	—	33,071	65–52
118	August 12	Twins	1–8	Pablo López (8–6)	**Taijuan Walker** (13–5)	—	40,117	65–53
119	August 13	Twins	0–3	Sonny Gray (6–5)	**Ranger Suárez** (2–6)	Jhoan Durán (21)	40,111	65–54
120	August 15	@ Blue Jays	1–2	Jordan Hicks (2–7)	**Seranthony Domínguez** (2–3)	Jordan Romano (29)	42,615	65–55
121	August 16	@ Blue Jays	9–4	**Aaron Nola** (10–8)	Kevin Gausman (9–7)	—	42,701	66–55
122	August 18	@ Nationals	7–8	José Ferrer (3–0)	**Michael Lorenzen** (7–8)	Kyle Finnegan (20)	26,747	66–56
123	August 19	@ Nationals	12–3	**Seranthony Domínguez** (3–3)	Cory Abbott (1–2)	—	38,853	67–56
124	August 20	@ Nationals	3–4	Trevor Williams (6–7)	**Zack Wheeler** (9–6)	Kyle Finnegan (21)	2,473	67–57
125	August 21	Giants	10–4	**Aaron Nola** (11–8)	Sean Manaea (4–4)	—	36,274	68–57
126	August 22	Giants	4–3	**Craig Kimbrel** (7–3)	Camilo Doval (5–4)	—	40,420	69–57
127	August 23	Giants	6–8 (10)	Jakob Junis (4–3)	**Craig Kimbrel** (7–4)	Ryan Walker (1)	33,035	69–58
128	August 25	Cardinals	7–2	**Cristopher Sánchez** (2–3)	Miles Mikolas (6–10)	—	34,118	70–58
129	August 26	Cardinals	12–1	**Zack Wheeler** (10–6)	Dakota Hudson (5–1)	—	44,097	71–58
130	August 27	Cardinals	3–0	**Aaron Nola** (12–8)	Drew Rom (0–2)	**Craig Kimbrel** (20)	41,141	72–58
131	August 28	Angels	6–4	**Taijuan Walker** (14–5)	Lucas Giolito (7–11)	**Craig Kimbrel** (21)	38,142	73–58
132	August 29	Angels	12–7	**Michael Lorenzen** (8–8)	Tyler Anderson (5–6)	—	36,096	74–58
133	August 30	Angels	8–10	Matt Moore (4–1)	**Craig Kimbrel** (7–5)	Carlos Estévez (29)	34,655	74–59

September/October: 16–13 (Home: 8–6; Away: 8–7)

#	Date	Opponent	Score	Win	Loss	Save	Attendance	Record
134	September 1	@ Brewers	5–7	Devin Williams (8–3)	**José Alvarado** (0–1)	—	32,519	74–60
135	September 2	@ Brewers	5–7	Andrew Chafin (3–4)	**Aaron Nola** (12–9)	Devin Williams (32)	35,253	74–61
136	September 3	@ Brewers	4–2	**Seranthony Domínguez** (4–3)	Wade Miley (7–4)	**Craig Kimbrel** (22)	33,473	75–61
137	September 4	@ Padres	9–7	**Taijuan Walker** (15–5)	Rich Hill (7–14)	**José Alvarado** (7)	39,719	76–61
138	September 5	@ Padres	0–8	Pedro Ávila (1–2)	**Michael Lorenzen** (8–9)	—	42,970	76–62
139	September 6	@ Padres	5–1	**Zack Wheeler** (11–6)	Michael Wacha (11–3)	—	34,317	77–62
140	September 8	Marlins	2–3	David Robertson (5–6)	**Matt Strahm** (8–4)	Tanner Scott (6)	40,190	77–63
141	September 9	Marlins	8–4	**Jeff Hoffman** (4–2)	Johnny Cueto (1–4)	—	40,899	78–63
142	September 10	Marlins	4–5	David Robertson (6–6)	**Seranthony Domínguez** (4–4)	Tanner Scott (7)	40,894	78–64
143	September 11 (1)	Braves	8–10 (10)	Raisel Iglesias (4–4)	**José Alvarado** (0–2)	Kirby Yates (4)	30,572	78–65
144	September 11 (2)	Braves	7–5	**Michael Lorenzen** (9–9)	Kyle Wright (0–2)	**Craig Kimbrel** (23)	27,025	79–65
145	September 12	Braves	6–7 (10)	Raisel Iglesias (5–4)	**Craig Kimbrel** (7–6)	Brad Hand (1)	28,683	79–66
146	September 13	Braves	1–4	Spencer Strider (17–5)	**Cristopher Sánchez** (2–4)	Kirby Yates (5)	31,333	79–67
–	September 14	Braves	Rescheduled (Eagles vs. Vikings at Lincoln Financial Field); Moved to September 11					
147	September 15	@ Cardinals	5–4	**Matt Strahm** (9–4)	Zack Thompson (5–6)	**José Alvarado** (8)	42,166	80–67
148	September 16	@ Cardinals	6–1	**Ranger Suárez** (3–6)	Miles Mikolas (7–12)	—	42,817	81–67
149	September 17	@ Cardinals	5–6	John King (2–1)	**Seranthony Domínguez** (4–5)	Ryan Helsley (11)	40,996	81–68
150	September 18	@ Braves	7–1	**Zack Wheeler** (12–6)	Kyle Wright (0–3)	—	39,216	82–68
151	September 19	@ Braves	3–9	Spencer Strider (18–5)	**Cristopher Sánchez** (2–5)	—	40,695	82–69
152	September 20	@ Braves	6–5 (10)	**Craig Kimbrel** (8–6)	A. J. Minter (3–6)	**Matt Strahm** (2)	38,856	83–69
153	September 21	Mets	5–4	**Ranger Suárez** (4–6)	Jeff Brigham (1–3)	**José Alvarado** (9)	30,116	84–69
154	September 22	Mets	5–4 (10)	**Seranthony Domínguez** (5–5)	Adam Ottavino (1–6)	—	38,795	85–69
155	September 23	Mets	7–5	**Zack Wheeler** (13–6)	José Quintana (3–6)	**José Alvarado** (10)	40,388	86–69
156	September 24	Mets	5–2	**Cristopher Sánchez** (3–5)	José Butto (1–3)	**Michael Lorenzen** (1)	41,139	87–69
157	September 26	Pirates	3–2 (10)	**Jeff Hoffman** (5–2)	David Bednar (3–3)	—	32,116	88–69
158	September 27	Pirates	7–6	**Orion Kerkering** (1–0)	José Hernández (1–3)	**Gregory Soto** (3)	31,388	89–69
159	September 28	Pirates	2–3	Luis Ortiz (5–5)	**Matt Strahm** (9–5)	David Bednar (38)	34,046	89–70
—	September 29	@ Mets	Postponed (rain); Makeup: September 30 as a straight doubleheader					
160	September 30 (1)	@ Mets	3–4	Tylor Megill (9–8)	**Taijuan Walker** (15–6)	Adam Ottavino (12)	see 2nd game	89–71
161	September 30 (2)	@ Mets	4–11	Reed Garrett (1–0)	**Michael Plassmeyer** (0–1)	—	41,102	89–72
162	October 1	@ Mets	9–1	**Nick Nelson** (1–0)	José Butto (1–4)	—	41,212	90–72

== Postseason ==
=== Postseason game log ===
2023 Postseason Game Log: 8–5 (Home: 6–2; Away: 2–3)
NL Wild Card Series: 2–0 (Home: 2–0; Away: 0–0)

#	Date	Opponent	Score	Win	Loss	Save	Attendance	Record
1	October 3	Marlins	4–1	Zack Wheeler (1–0)	Jesús Luzardo (0–1)	Craig Kimbrel (1)	45,662	1–0
2	October 4	Marlins	7–1	Aaron Nola (1–0)	Braxton Garrett (0–1)	—	45,738	2–0

NL Division Series: 3–1 (Home: 2–0; Away: 1–1)

#	Date	Opponent	Score	Win	Loss	Save	Attendance	Record
1	October 7	@ Braves	3–0	Jeff Hoffman (1–0)	Spencer Strider (0–1)	Craig Kimbrel (2)	43,689	1–0
2	October 9	@ Braves	4–5	A. J. Minter (1–0)	Jeff Hoffman (1–1)	Raisel Iglesias (1)	43,898	1–1
3	October 11	Braves	10–2	Aaron Nola (2–0)	Bryce Elder (0–1)	—	45,798	2–1
4	October 12	Braves	3–1	Ranger Suárez (1–0)	Spencer Strider (0–2)	Matt Strahm (1)	45,831	3–1

NL Championship Series: 3–4 (Home: 2–2; Away: 1–2)

#	Date	Opponent	Score	Win	Loss	Save	Attendance	Record
1	October 16	Diamondbacks	5–3	Zack Wheeler (2–0)	Zac Gallen (2–1)	Craig Kimbrel (3)	45,396	1–0
2	October 17	Diamondbacks	10–0	Aaron Nola (3–0)	Merrill Kelly (1–1)	—	45,412	2–0
3	October 19	@ Diamondbacks	1–2	Paul Sewald (1–0)	Craig Kimbrel (0–1)	—	47,075	2–1
4	October 20	@ Diamondbacks	5–6	Kevin Ginkel (1–0)	Craig Kimbrel (0–2)	Paul Sewald (5)	47,806	2–2
5	October 21	@ Diamondbacks	6–1	Zack Wheeler (3–0)	Zac Gallen (2–2)	—	47,897	3–2
6	October 23	Diamondbacks	1–5	Merrill Kelly (2–1)	Aaron Nola (3–1)	—	45,473	3–3
7	October 24	Diamondbacks	2–4	Ryan Thompson (1–0)	Ranger Suárez (1–1)	Paul Sewald (6)	45,397	3–4

=== Postseason rosters ===
Playoff rosters
National League Wild Card Series

- Pitchers: 25 Matt Strahm 27 Aaron Nola 30 Gregory Soto 31 Craig Kimbrel 45 Zack Wheeler 46 José Alvarado 50 Orion Kerkering 55 Ranger Suárez 58 Seranthony Domínguez 61 Cristopher Sánchez 68 Jeff Hoffman 99 Taijuan Walker
- Catchers: 10 J. T. Realmuto 21 Garrett Stubbs
- Infielders: 3 Bryce Harper 5 Bryson Stott 7 Trea Turner 28 Alec Bohm 33 Edmundo Sosa 37 Weston Wilson
- Outfielders: 8 Nick Castellanos 12 Kyle Schwarber 16 Brandon Marsh 18 Johan Rojas 19 Cristian Pache 44 Jake Cave

National League Division Series

- Pitchers: 22 Michael Lorenzen 25 Matt Strahm 27 Aaron Nola 30 Gregory Soto 31 Craig Kimbrel 45 Zack Wheeler 46 José Alvarado 50 Orion Kerkering 55 Ranger Suárez 58 Seranthony Domínguez 61 Cristopher Sánchez 68 Jeff Hoffman 99 Taijuan Walker
- Catchers: 10 J. T. Realmuto 21 Garrett Stubbs
- Infielders: 3 Bryce Harper 5 Bryson Stott 7 Trea Turner 28 Alec Bohm 33 Edmundo Sosa
- Outfielders: 8 Nick Castellanos 12 Kyle Schwarber 16 Brandon Marsh 18 Johan Rojas 19 Cristian Pache 44 Jake Cave

National League Championship Series

- Pitchers: 22 Michael Lorenzen 25 Matt Strahm 27 Aaron Nola 30 Gregory Soto 31 Craig Kimbrel 45 Zack Wheeler 46 José Alvarado 50 Orion Kerkering 55 Ranger Suárez 58 Seranthony Domínguez 61 Cristopher Sánchez 68 Jeff Hoffman 99 Taijuan Walker
- Catchers: 10 J. T. Realmuto 21 Garrett Stubbs
- Infielders: 3 Bryce Harper 5 Bryson Stott 7 Trea Turner 28 Alec Bohm 33 Edmundo Sosa
- Outfielders: 8 Nick Castellanos 12 Kyle Schwarber 16 Brandon Marsh 18 Johan Rojas 19 Cristian Pache 44 Jake Cave

== Farm system ==
Level	Team	League	Manager
AAA	Lehigh Valley IronPigs	International League	Anthony Contreras
AA	Reading Fightin Phils	Eastern League	Al Pedrique
High A	Jersey Shore BlueClaws	South Atlantic League	Greg Brodzinski
Low-A	Clearwater Threshers	Florida State League	Marty Malloy
Rookie	FCL Phillies	Florida Complex League	Shawn Williams
Rookie	DSL Phillies Red	Dominican Summer League	Nerluis Martinez
Rookie	DSL Phillies White	Dominican Summer League	Orlando Munoz
