= Alec Bohm =

American baseball player (born 1996)

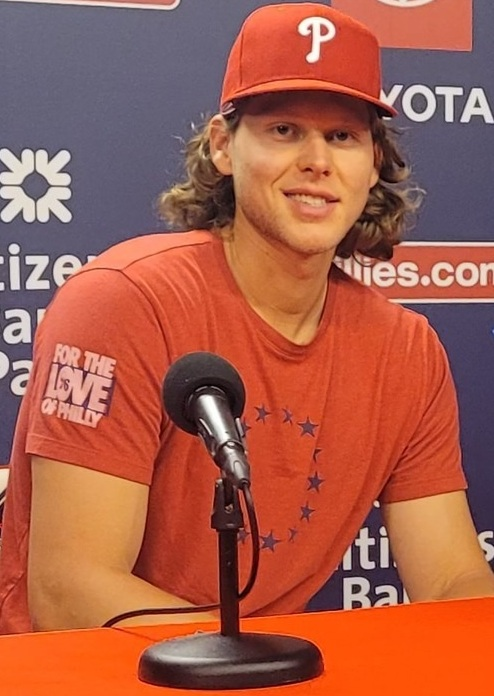
- Bohm with the Philadelphia Phillies in 2023

Free agent
- Third baseman / First baseman
- Born: August 3, 1996 (age 30); Omaha, Nebraska, U.S.
- Bats: Right Throws: Right

MLB debut
- August 13, 2020, for the Philadelphia Phillies

MLB statistics (through 2026 season)
- Batting average: .273
- Home runs: 85
- Runs batted in: 483
- Stats at Baseball Reference

Teams
- Philadelphia Phillies (2020–2026)

Career highlights and awards
- All-Star (2024)

Alec Daniel Bohm (born August 3, 1996) is an American professional baseball third baseman and first baseman who is a free agent. He has played in Major League Baseball (MLB) for the Philadelphia Phillies. He has also represented USA Baseball in international competition.

Born and raised in Nebraska, Bohm played baseball for Roncalli Catholic High School. He played three seasons of college baseball for the Wichita State Shockers. At the end of this time, the Phillies selected Bohm third overall in the 2018 MLB draft. He rose quickly through Philadelphia's farm system, making his MLB debut in 2020. That year, he was the runner-up for Rookie of the Year. In 2024, Bohm made his first MLB All-Star Game appearance, also participating in that year's Home Run Derby.

== Early life ==
Bohm was born August 3, 1996, in Omaha, Nebraska, and he played four years of varsity baseball for Roncalli Catholic High School. The summer before his final season of high school baseball, Bohm experienced a growth spurt that made him appear awkward in front of scouts. Around that same time, Bohm fractured his elbow in a summer league tournament, preventing him from developing as a pitcher. In his final season with Roncalli Catholic, Bohm led all Nebraska high schoolers with a .533 batting average. The summer after graduating high school, Bohm won the Connie Mack World Series Home Run Derby with 22 home runs and came in fourth place at the Triple-A Home Run Derby. Despite his performance in high school, no Major League Baseball (MLB) team selected Bohm in the 2015 MLB draft.

== College career ==
Although Bohm wanted to remain in his home state, he was not recruited to play college baseball for the Nebraska Cornhuskers. Instead, he committed to the Wichita State Shockers, the only team to offer him a scholarship. Bohm's college career began with a home run in his first at bat, a pinch hitting appearance against Northern Colorado. As a freshman in 2016, Bohm played in 51 games, starting 44 of them, and split his time between third base and designated hitter. He hit .303 with six home runs and 30 runs batted in (RBIs). This included a 12-game hitting streak in which he went 20-for-51 with three home runs and 11 RBIs. At the end of the season, Collegiate Baseball Newspaper named Bohm to their Freshman All-American team. At the end of the Wichita State season, Bohm played collegiate summer baseball for the Wilmington Sharks of the Coastal Plain League (CPL). There, he hit .330 with 11 home runs and 51 RBIs in 54 games, He also attended the CPL All-Star Game, defeating Dillon Stewart in the home run derby.

Bohm returned to the Shockers in 2017 as their starting third baseman, having lost 20 pounds (9.1 kg) during the offseason. Bohm struggled at the start of the season, hitting .240 by April 2. He attributed the difficulties to "trying to do too much" at the plate. Between April 5 and May 5, Bohm went on an 18-game hitting streak, during which he hit .447 with 11 extra-base hits, including four home runs. Bohm started all 58 games in which he played that season, with intermittent appearances at first base. In that time, he hit .305 with 11 home runs and 40 RBIs. At the end of the year, Bohm received First Team All-Conference honors from the Missouri Valley Conference (MVC). Bohm played collegiate summer baseball again in 2017, this time with the Falmouth Commodores of the Cape Cod Baseball League (CCBL), with whom he gained experience with a wooden bat. He played the entire CCBL season, hitting .351 with 28 RBIs and 23 runs scored, and received All-Star and All-League honors in the process.

Bohm began the 2018 season as a Perfect Game Preseason All-American. After Bohm began the season 6-for-11 with seven RBIs and a grand slam, he and outfielder Greyson Jenista were nicknamed "the Bash Brothers". He was third in the Shockers' batting order, behind leadoff hitter Luke Ritter and Jenista. He started at third base in all 57 games he played that season, hitting .339 with 16 home runs and 55 RBIs. One of his greatest strengths was plate discipline, as Bohm walked 39 times and recorded only 28 strikeouts in 224 at bats. Despite his strong offensive production, he struggled defensively at third base, with 14 errors and an .899 fielding percentage. Five publications named Bohm to a 2018 College Baseball All-America Team: the American Baseball Coaches Association and Baseball America named him to their second team, the National Collegiate Baseball Writers Association and D1Baseball.com named him to their third team, and he received an honorable mention from Perfect Game. He was also a semifinalist for both the Dick Howser Trophy and the Golden Spikes Award. In three seasons of college baseball, Bohm hit .317 with 33 home runs and 126 RBIs.

== Professional career ==
=== Draft and minor leagues (2018–2019) ===
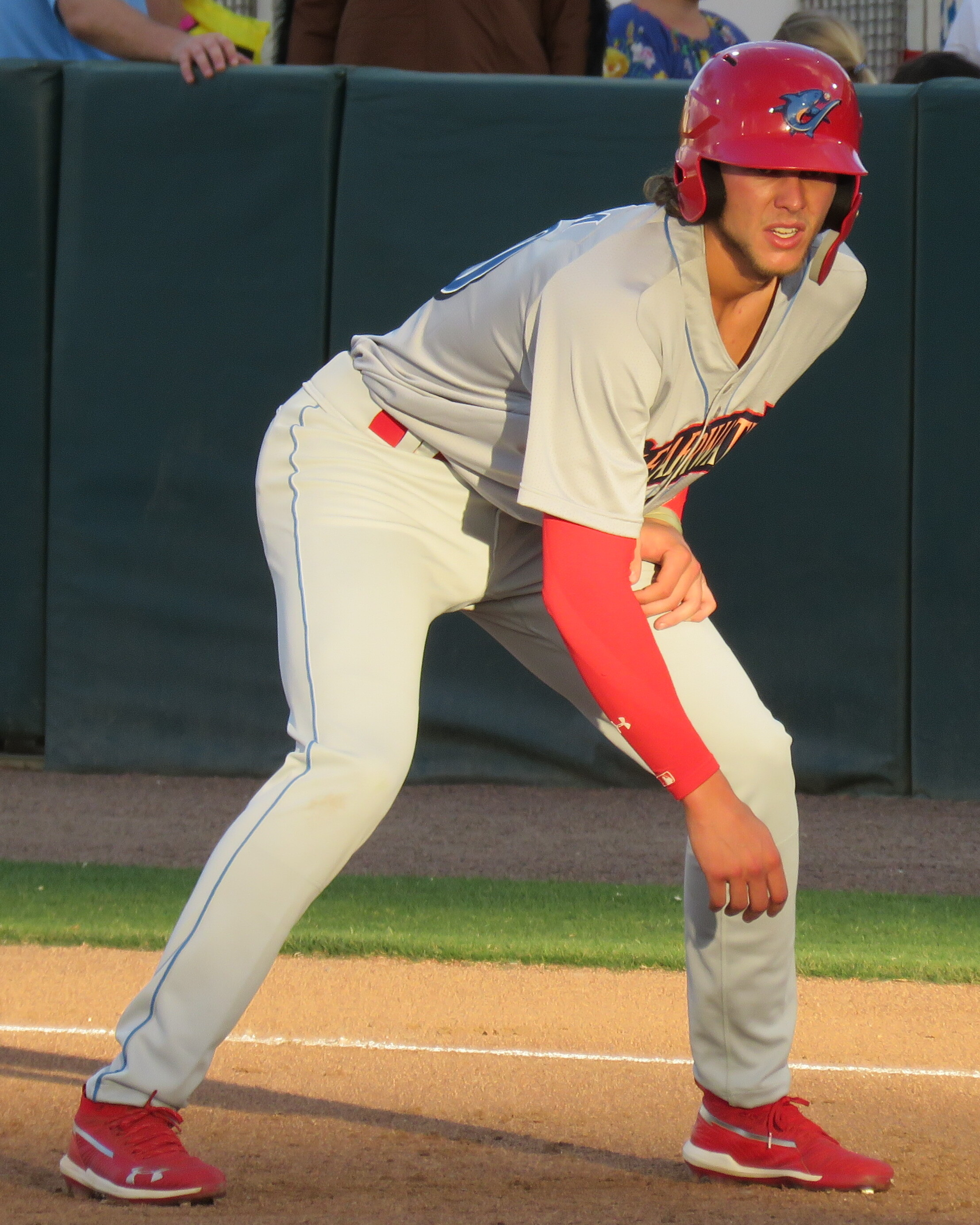
Bohm with the Clearwater Threshers in 2019

The Philadelphia Phillies of Major League Baseball, who had lacked a long-term third baseman since Scott Rolen left in 2002, selected Bohm third overall in the 2018 MLB draft. He signed with the organization on June 12 for a $5.85 million signing bonus, and he was assigned to the Rookie-level Gulf Coast League Phillies to begin his professional career. After only three games there, during which he went 5-for-10 with two RBIs, Bohm was promoted to the Class A Short Season Williamsport Crosscutters. His season was interrupted on July 8, when he was hit by a pitch that struck a nerve in his left knee. Bohm missed a month with the injury, returning from the disabled list on August 20. After a difficult first stretch with the Crosscutters, Bohm hit .289 in his final ten games. Bohm played 29 games with Williamsport, during which he hit .224 with six extra-base hits and 12 RBIs.

Bohm opened the 2019 season with the Lakewood BlueClaws of the Class A South Atlantic League. He played 22 games there, hitting .367 with three home runs and 11 RBIs, before receiving a promotion to the Class A-Advanced Clearwater Threshers at the end of April. He continued his production there, with hits in 11 of his first 13 Florida State League games. After hitting .329 with four home runs and 27 RBIs in 27 games for Clearwater, Bohm was promoted again on June 20, this time to the Double-A Reading Fightin Phils. While playing for Reading, Bohm was selected to represent the Phillies at the All-Star Futures Game in Cleveland. Bohm played 65 games for Reading, during which he hit .269 with 14 home runs and 42 RBIs. Across all three minor league levels, Bohm hit .305 in 2019, with 21 home runs and 80 RBIs. At the end of the season, Bohm received the Paul Owens Award for top minor league position player in the Phillies farm system. Later that year, he was selected to participate in the Arizona Fall League (AFL) as a member of the Scottsdale Scorpions. He hit .361 with two home runs and nine RBIs in 19 fall league games.

=== Philadelphia Phillies (2020–present) ===
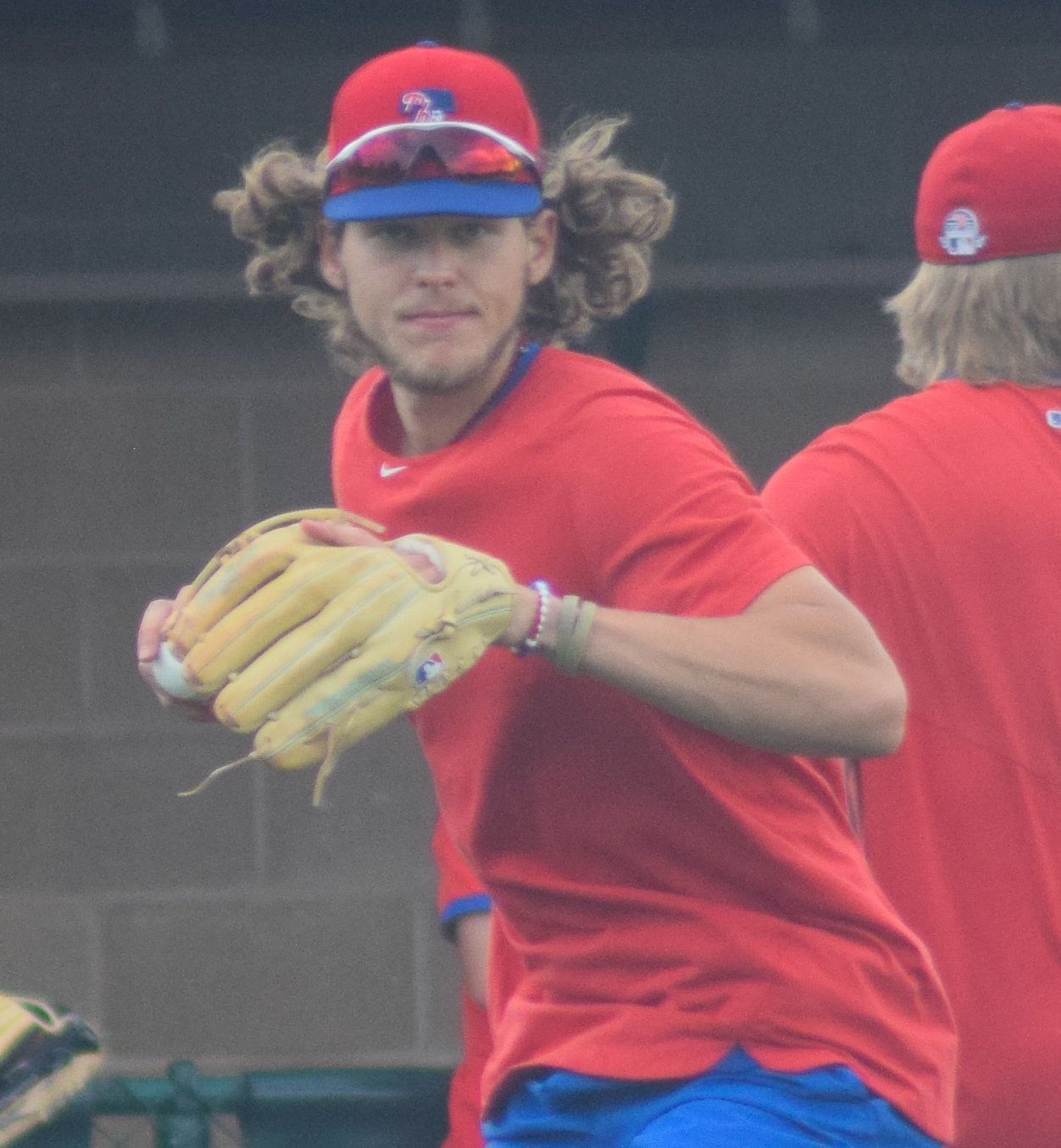
Bohm with the Phillies in 2020

Although not expected to make the Opening Day roster, Bohm was invited to Phillies spring training in 2020. He was 9-for-22 in Grapefruit League play before the season was halted due to the COVID-19 pandemic. With the cancellation of the 2020 minor league season, Bohm was sent to the Phillies's alternate training site in Allentown, Pennsylvania. Manager Joe Girardi told reporters that Bohm would remain at the training site unless there was an opportunity for him to play "almost every day" on the major league roster. That opportunity arrived on August 13, when Adam Haseley sustained a sprained left wrist. The Phillies promoted Bohm, moving Jean Segura to second base and Scott Kingery to a utility role to make room for him. Bohm doubled in his first major league at-bat against the Baltimore Orioles. His first major league home run followed on August 23, in a 5–4 victory over the Atlanta Braves. Bohm finished the season hitting .338 with four home runs and 23 RBIs in 44 games, and led National League rookies with 54 hits and 18 multi-hit games. He tied San Diego Padres infielder Jake Cronenworth for second place for NL Rookie of the Year, losing to Devin Williams of the Milwaukee Brewers.

Bohm entered the 2021 season as the Phillies' starting third baseman and struggled defensively and offensively. Despite hitting the ball harder than the year prior, he was hitting .240 with a .613 on-base plus slugging (OPS) by the end of June, including a 22-game span without recording an extra-base hit. At third base, he had 12 errors and a position-worst −13 Defensive Runs Saved in that same span. Bohm was removed partway through the Phillies's July 10 game against the Boston Red Sox after testing positive for an asymptomatic case of COVID-19. His hitting improved after June 1, but he failed to make routine plays at third base; by mid-August, Ronald Torreyes took over the position. On August 22, the Phillies demoted Bohm to the Triple-A Lehigh Valley IronPigs. In 15 International League games, Bohm hit .271 with one home run and six RBIs. Bohm credited his stint in Triple-A with restoring his confidence, and he was promoted back to the majors on September 28, providing a bench option in the last six games of the season. Bohm finished the year hitting .247 with seven home runs and 47 RBIs in 115 major league games.

Going into the 2022 season, Bohm spent spring training in competition with top prospect Bryson Stott for the starting third baseman role. Both players made the opening day roster, under Dave Dombrowski's condition that both receive regular playing time. By the end of April, Bohm had reclaimed the starting third baseman job, and Stott was demoted to Triple-A. On June 7, Bohm became the first batter to record a home run against Josh Hader since July 2021, sparking a 3–2 win over the Milwaukee Brewers. In his first two seasons, Bohm struggled to catch up to high-velocity fastballs, an issue he remedied in 2022 with a mechanical adjustment inspired by Paul Goldschmidt. In 152 regular season games, Bohm hit .280 with 13 home runs and 72 RBIs, and he attributed his turnaround to coaches Bobby Dickerson and Kevin Long, as well as veteran teammates like Jean Segura and Rhys Hoskins. Bohm's defensive performance against the St. Louis Cardinals in the 2022 National League Wild Card Series helped the Phillies advance to the 2022 National League Division Series (NLDS). He was 2-for-15 against the Atlanta Braves in the NLDS and 3-for-17 against the San Diego Padres in the 2022 National League Championship Series (NLCS). Bohm hit his first career postseason home run off of Lance McCullers Jr. in Game 3 of the 2022 World Series, the 1,000th home run in World Series history. He went 6-for-21 in the series, which the Phillies lost in six games to the Houston Astros.

Ahead of the 2023 season, Bohm hoped to add more power to his arsenal by adding strength and improving his pitch selection. Although primarily a third baseman, Bohm made occasional appearances at first base when the Phillies lost Rhys Hoskins to a season-ending anterior cruciate ligament injury. Amidst a slump that saw him hitting .220 with a .594 OPS by the end of May, Bohm spent ten days on the injured list with a hamstring injury. Although Bohm hit .359 in his first 17 games, he only hit .220 in the next 36. From June 1 to June 10, Bohm was on the injured list with a strained left hamstring. Bohm finished the regular season hitting .274, with 20 home runs and 97 RBIs in 145 games. He was particularly adept at hitting with runners on base, which Bohm attributed to watching Miguel Cabrera when he was in college. Bohm was 2-for-8 against the Miami Marlins in the 2023 National League Wild Card Series, and he was 2-for-13 against the Atlanta Braves in the 2023 NLDS. Although he showed strong defense against the Arizona Diamondbacks in the 2023 NLCS, he was 7-for-25 at the plate, and the Phillies lost the series in seven games.

Bohm won his salary arbitration case with the Phillies prior to the 2024 season, earning a $4 million salary. By the end of April, Bohm was the cleanup hitter behind Bryce Harper due to his success hitting with runners in scoring position. Bohm received his first Major League Baseball All-Star Game selection in 2024, starting at third base for the National League team. He also participated in the Home Run Derby, where he lost to Teoscar Hernández in the semifinal round. Bohm left the Phillies' August 29 game against the Atlanta Braves after hurting his left hand on a swing. Although X-rays were negative, the pain continued, and he was on the injured list from September 6 to September 15. Bohm hit .280 in the regular season, with 15 home runs and 97 RBIs in 143 games. He was hitless against the New York Mets in 13 2024 NLDS at-bats, however, and was benched in favor of Edmundo Sosa in Game 2.

Despite rumors that he would be traded, Bohm remained with the Phillies for the 2025 season on a $7.7 million salary. After hitting .150 in his first 14 games, Bohm was dropped down the batting order, where his performance steadily improved, culminating with his first home run of the season on May 6. On July 12, Bohm left the Phillies' game against the San Diego Padres after being struck on the side by a pitch from Yu Darvish. Initial imaging did not reveal a fracture, but after aggravating the injury the next week against the Los Angeles Angels, Bohm was placed on the injured list with a fractured left rib. He returned on August 17, hitting a three-run home run against the Washington Nationals in his first game back. After experiencing left shoulder inflammation for most of the season, Bohm was shut down on September 8 to receive treatment, returning on September 20. He finished the regular season hitting .287 with 11 home runs and 59 RBIs in 120 games. Bohm was 4-for-12 in the 2025 NLDS, which the Phillies lost to the Los Angeles Dodgers in four games.

Bohm and the Phillies avoided arbitration in 2026, awarding him $10.2 million for the final year of his contract. He began the year as one of the worst hitters in baseball, hitting only .159 with a .433 OPS in the first six weeks of the season.

== International career ==
In 2019, Bohm was named to USA Baseball's roster for the 2019 WBSC Premier12, one of several qualifying tournaments for the 2020 Summer Olympics. As the team's starting third baseman, he hit .233 in nine games, with one home run and four RBIs. His best game was against the Dominican Republic national baseball team, where he went 3-for-4 with a double, a home run, and three RBIs. Bohm and Team USA finished in fourth place, losing 3–2 to the Mexico national baseball team in the bronze medal match.

== Personal life ==
In 2026, Bohm sued his parents in the Philadelphia Court of Common Pleas, alleging $3 million worth of financial mismanagement dating back to 2019. As part of the legal proceedings, Bohm fired his agent Scott Boras, replacing him with an agent from The Team. The parties settled out of court that September.

== See also ==
- List of Philadelphia Phillies first-round draft picks
