= Brandon Marsh (baseball) =

American baseball player (born 1997)

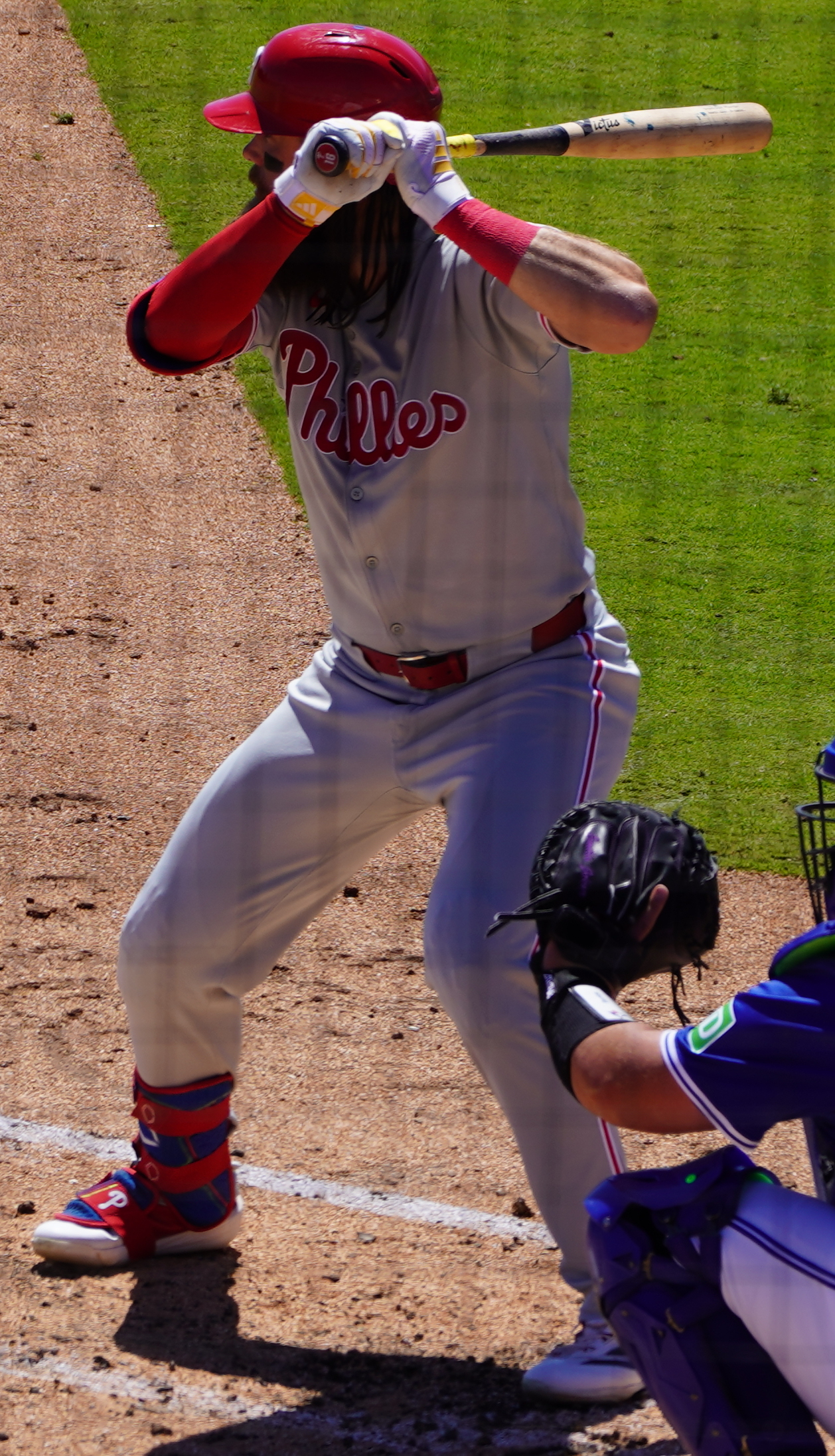
- Marsh with the Philadelphia Phillies in 2025

Philadelphia Phillies – No. 16
- Outfielder
- Born: December 18, 1997 (age 28); Buford, Georgia, U.S.
- Bats: Left Throws: Right

MLB debut
- July 18, 2021, for the Los Angeles Angels

MLB statistics (through 2026 season)
- Batting average: .261
- Home runs: 70
- Runs batted in: 296
- Stats at Baseball Reference

Teams
- Los Angeles Angels (2021–2022); Philadelphia Phillies (2022–present)

Career highlights and awards
- All-Star (2026)

Brandon Chase Marsh (born December 18, 1997) is an American professional baseball outfielder for the Philadelphia Phillies of Major League Baseball (MLB). He previously played in MLB for the Los Angeles Angels.

Born in Buford, Georgia, Marsh was a multi-sport athlete at Buford High School, where he won a state championship title as a junior. The Angels selected him in the second round of the 2016 MLB draft, but he missed the 2016 season with a back injury. After debuting with the Orem Owlz in 2017, Marsh progressed through the Angels' farm system, including a breakout turn with the Southern League in 2019. When the 2020 Minor League Baseball season was canceled due to the COVID-19 pandemic, Marsh was invited to continue his development at an alternate training site.

Marsh made his MLB debut in 2021 as a replacement for injured outfielders Mike Trout and Justin Upton. After a slow start to his major league career, he improved offensively throughout the season. Marsh made the Angels' Opening Day roster in 2022 as part of a platoon of corner outfielders, but he was traded to the Philadelphia Phillies partway through the season. Marsh was named to his first All-Star game in 2026.

== Early life ==
Marsh was born on December 18, 1997, in Buford, Georgia, to Jake and Sonja Marsh. A multisport athlete, he grew up playing American football, basketball, and baseball. Over four years at Buford High School, Marsh grew from 5 feet 9 inches (1.75 m) to 6 feet 4 inches (1.93 m), and he only attracted the attention of college recruiters after growing into his larger frame. During his junior baseball season, Marsh batted .370 with 15 runs batted in (RBI). He and teammate Joey Bart, a future Major League Baseball (MLB) catcher, took Buford to a Georgia High School Association state championship title. The following season, Marsh batted .559 with three home runs and 25 RBI. Buford reached the state championship again, where they fell to Locust Grove High School.

== Professional career ==
=== Draft and minor leagues (2016–2021) ===
The Los Angeles Angels selected Marsh out of high school in the second round, 60th overall, of the 2016 MLB draft. At the time, he had committed to play college baseball for the Kennesaw State Owls. Although he initially told reporters that he would not sign with the team, Marsh ultimately chose to forgo his college commitment, taking a $1.07 million signing bonus with Los Angeles to begin his professional baseball career. Marsh was assigned to the AZL Angels, a Rookie-level team in the Los Angeles farm system, but he was soon diagnosed with an asymptomatic back injury and spent the season on the disabled list. Instead, Marsh spent the offseason practicing in the Arizona Instructional League, the Dominican Republic, and the Angels' minor league spring training facility. Marsh made his professional debut with the Orem Owlz in 2017, where he batted .533 with eight runs scored and six RBI in his first three Pioneer League games. On June 28, only seven games into his professional career, Marsh sprained his thumb while sliding into a base. He missed one month with the injury, returning on July 28 and finishing the season with a .350 batting average, 22 extra-base hits, and 44 RBI in 39 games.

Marsh began the 2018 baseball season with the Burlington Bees, the Angels' Low-A affiliate. After going 1-for-11 to start the season, Marsh went on an eight-game hitting streak, finishing April with a .299 batting average. After batting .296 with three home runs and 24 RBI in 34 Midwest League games, Marsh was promoted to the Class A-Advanced Inland Empire 66ers on May 18. He struggled with the transition to the California League, going 3-for-41 in his first 10 games, and at the end of May, hitting coordinators worked with Marsh to shorten his swing and improve his pitch contact. He finished the season batting .256 in 93 California League games, with seven home runs and 46 RBI in 371 at bats.

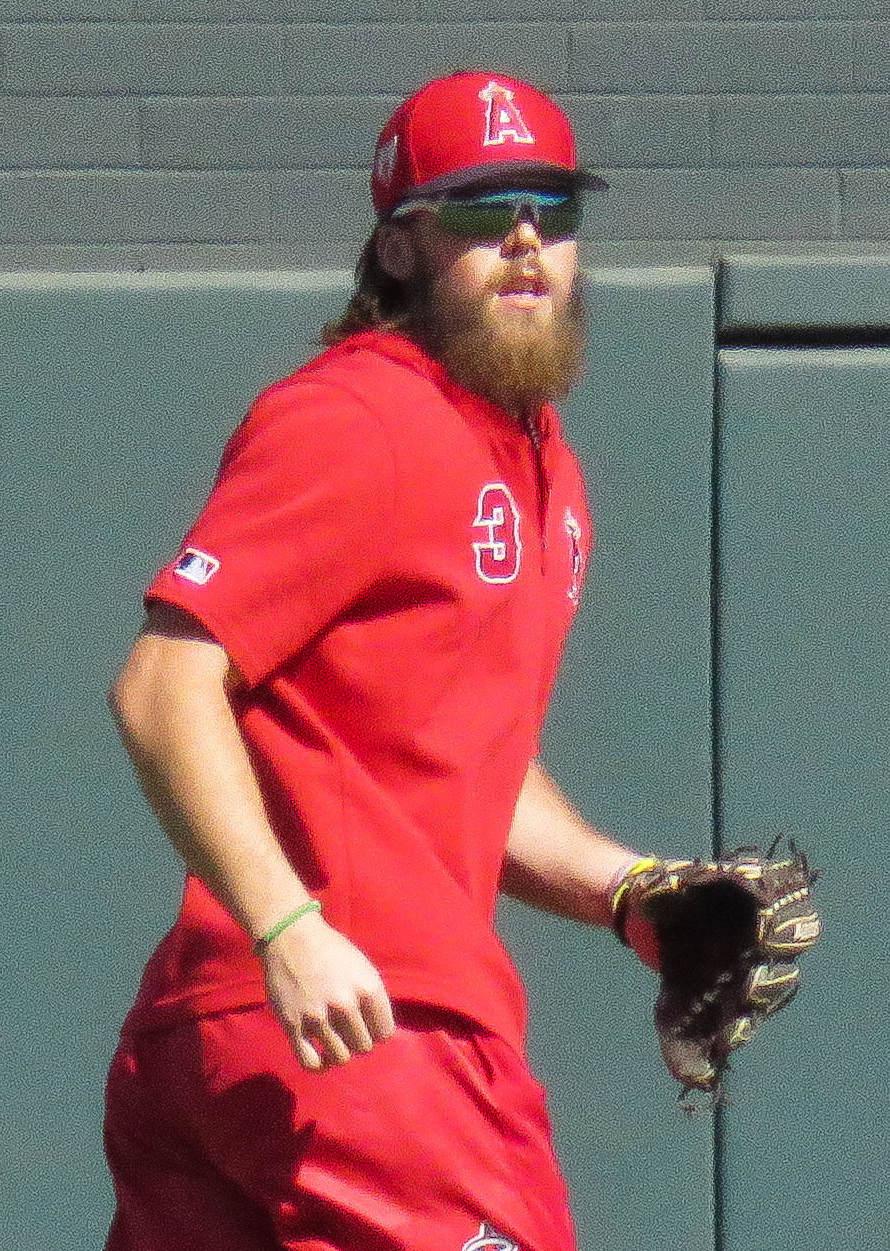
Marsh with the Angels in 2019

The Angels invited Marsh to spring training in 2019, and after batting .240 in the Cactus League, he began the season in Double-A with the Mobile BayBears. He struggled early in the season, batting .200 in his first 22 Southern League games, but improved to a .347 batting average in May after taking a more aggressive approach at the plate. After hitting .292 with one home run and 17 RBI in the first two months of the season, Marsh missed the month of June with a leg injury. He finished the season batting .300 with seven home runs and 43 RBI in 96 games, and he received both Mid- and Post-Season All-Star honors from the Southern League. Later that year, Marsh played for the Mesa Solar Sox in the Arizona Fall League, where he batted .328 with two home runs and 11 RBI in 19 games. Both home runs came during Mesa's 9–5 loss to the Glendale Desert Dogs on October 14.

Early in the Angels' 2020 spring training, Marsh suffered a Grade 2 strain in his left elbow while diving to make a catch in center field. By the time that he was cleared to play baseball, the impact of the COVID-19 pandemic had shut down all MLB and minor league operations. MLB eventually returned to play in July, but the 2020 Minor League Baseball season was canceled in its entirety. As a result, high-ranked prospects, including Marsh, were assigned to alternate training sites to continue their development and await potential major league promotions. Working out of Blair Field, Marsh spent the season developing his hitting and learning how to play first base as a supplement to his usual outfield positions. That November, the Angels added Marsh to the 40-man roster to protect him from being taken by another team in the Rule 5 draft. Marsh suffered a glenoid labrum injury during the 2020 season, which he aggravated during spring training the following season. The injury delayed his spring conditioning, and Marsh did not make his season debut until May 13, when he joined the Triple-A Salt Lake Bees in the Pacific Coast League. Marsh struggled through the first few weeks of the season, batting only .183 in 16 games for Salt Lake. He left the Bees' June 1 game with a shoulder injury, which kept him on the injured list until July 8. Marsh hit a home run against the Sacramento River Cats on July 8, his first at bat after returning from the injury. He batted .382 with two home runs and six RBI in eight games before his major league promotion, giving him a season average of .255 in 24 Triple-A games.

=== Los Angeles Angels (2021–2022) ===
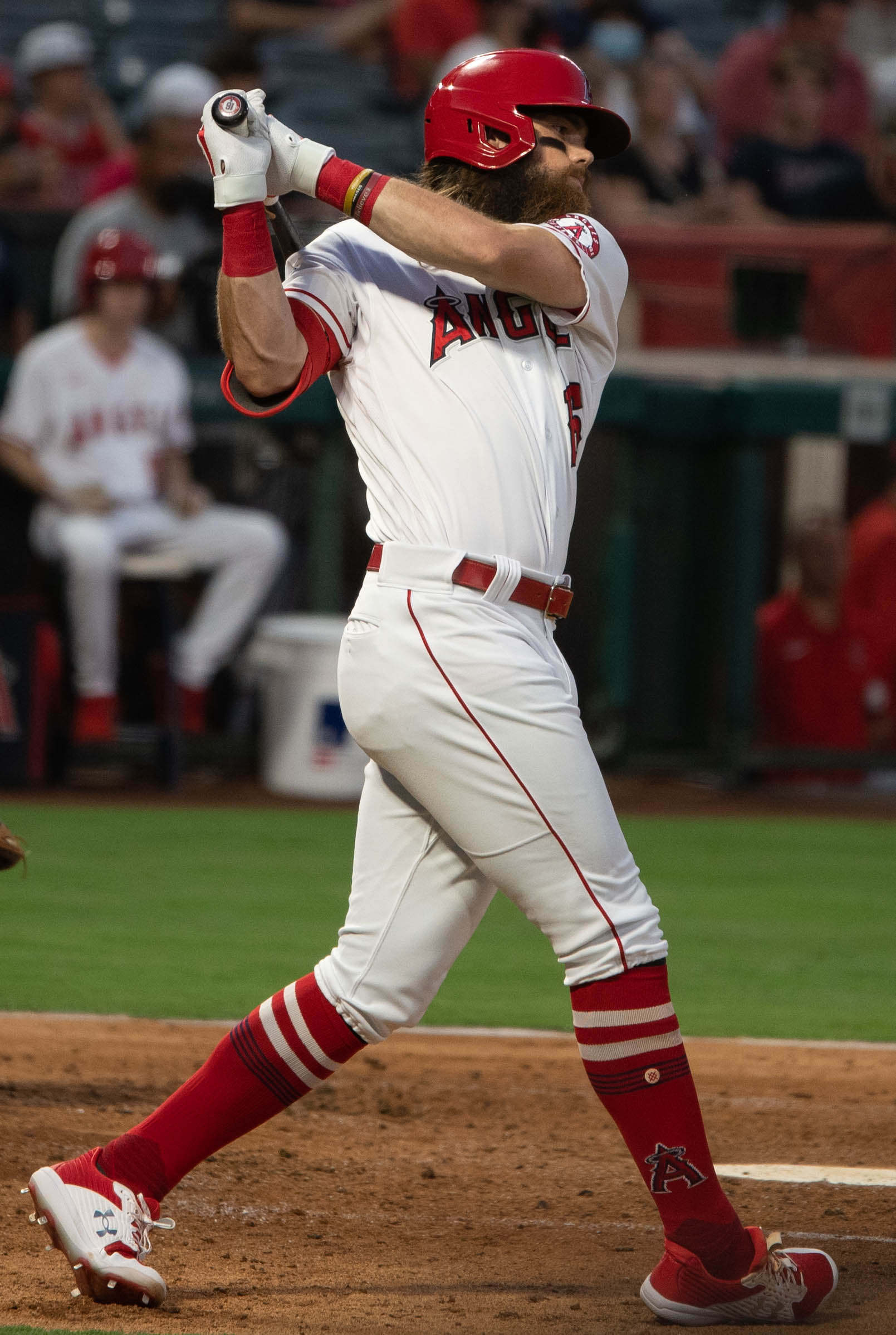
Marsh with the Los Angeles Angels in 2021

After injuries to Mike Trout and Justin Upton left the Angels with few outfield options, Marsh was promoted to Los Angeles on July 18, 2021. He made his MLB debut that day, starting in center field. He went 0-for-4 at the plate with two strikeouts in the Angels' 7–4 loss to the Seattle Mariners. The following day, Marsh recorded his first three major league hits, as well as an RBI on a ninth inning double, as Los Angeles lost 4–1 to the Oakland Athletics. On August 19, Marsh contributed to the Angels' 13–10 comeback win over the Detroit Tigers when he tripled twice in one game, becoming the first Angel to do so since Erick Aybar in 2011. Marsh's first major league home run came off of Marcos Diplán the following week, during the Angels' August 25 game against the Baltimore Orioles. Although Marsh plated three runs on the play, the Angels lost the game 10–6 to Baltimore. Marsh struggled early after his call-up, batting only .155 in his first 24 major league games. He improved as the season progressed, hitting .297 in the last 46 games of the season. He finished his rookie season batting .254 in 70 games, with two home runs and 19 RBI in 236 at bats.

Marsh was named to the Angels' Opening Day roster in 2022 alongside Mike Trout and Jo Adell. Manager Joe Maddon planned to use Trout in center field while rotating Marsh, Adell, and Taylor Ward in the corner outfield positions. Marsh began the season on a hot streak, batting .340 with a .943 on-base plus slugging (OPS) by April 28. By the end of May, he was batting .366, including a .932 OPS with runners in scoring position. Marsh was one of many players to struggle during the Angels' 14-game losing streak in June, batting only .149 during that time. He did not hit a home run between May 7 and June 11, when he recorded two against the New York Mets to break his slump. Marsh played 93 games for Los Angeles in 2022, batting .226 with eight home runs and 37 RBI in that time.

=== Philadelphia Phillies (2022–present) ===
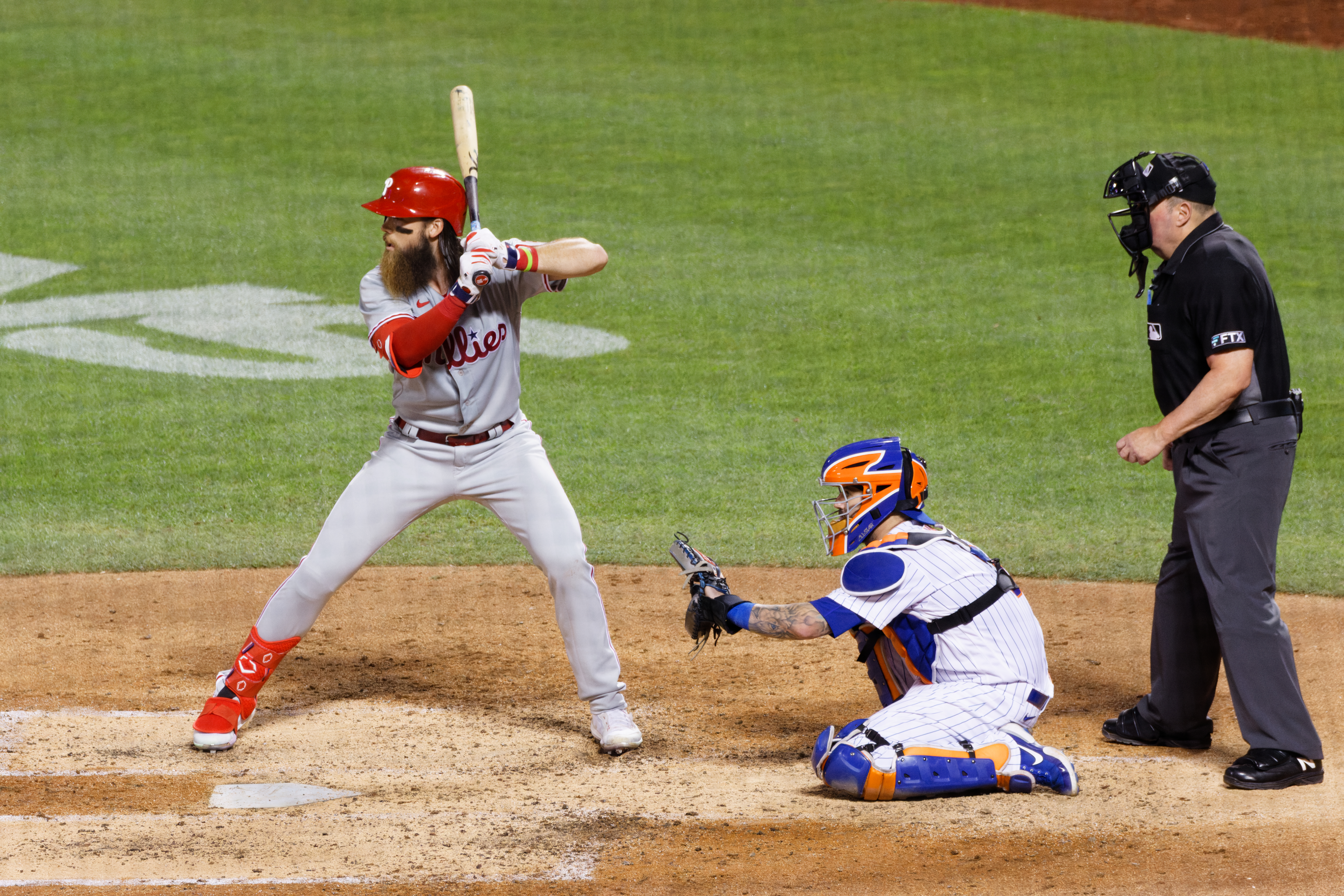
Marsh with the Philadelphia Phillies in 2022

On August 2, 2022, the Angels traded Marsh to the Philadelphia Phillies in exchange for catching prospect Logan O'Hoppe. Philadelphia, who had lacked a long-term center field option, had targeted Marsh during the previous offseason, but had been unable to acquire him until the MLB trading deadline. On August 17, during a game against the Cincinnati Reds, Marsh suffered a bone bruise in his knee and injured his ankle when he ran into the outfield wall at Great American Ball Park. He was placed on the 10-day injured list, and returned on August 27. On August 31 Marsh hit his first triple as a Phillie in an 18–2 win against the Arizona Diamondbacks.

In the 2022 regular season, he batted .245/.295/.384 between the two teams in 424 at bats, with 28 walks and 158 strikeouts.

For 2023, Marsh was the regular center fielder against right-handed pitching and improved his offensive production, batting .277/.372/.458, while nearly doubling his walk total to 59, to go along with 144 strikeouts. In the playoffs, he played in 12 games, slashing .342/.405/.526, as the Phillies were eliminated in the NLCS by the Arizona Diamondbacks.

During the offseason before the 2024 Major League Baseball season, Marsh had surgery on his left knee on February 9, and was expected to return to play in three to four weeks. The Phillies said Marsh would be ready by Opening Day on March 28 at Citizens Bank Park. Marsh made his 2024 season debut on March 29 against the Atlanta Braves; he went 1-for-4, with a two-run home run, in a 9–3 loss. On June 3, March was placed on the 10-day injured list with a right hamstring strain that he suffered in a loss to the St. Louis Cardinals. The Phillies activated Marsh from the injured list on June 15. In the 2024 regular season, he batted .249/.328/.419 in 418 at bats, with 50 walks and 154 strikeouts. In the playoffs, he played in 4 games and slashed .077/.077/.077 as the Phillies were eliminated in the NLDS by the New York Mets.

Marsh started the 2025 season as an outfielder for the Phillies, playing both center field and left field. On April 20, Marsh was placed on the 10-day injured list via a right hamstring strain. Philadelphia made the move retroactive to April 17, a day after Marsh, after an attempt to field a ball that took an unexpected bounce, felt discomfort in the back of his right knee extending into the hamstring. On June 9 against the Chicago Cubs, Marsh recorded his first career walk-off hit, singling off the wall in left-center field before being swarmed by his teammates. On July 21, Marsh scored the winning run from 3rd base on the first walk-off catcher's interference call in 54 years, in Philadelphia's 4–3 win over the Boston Red Sox.

== Personal life ==
Marsh's younger sister Erin Marsh is a track and field athlete who won a US championship in heptathlon.
