= Andrew Vasquez (baseball) =

American baseball player (born 1993)

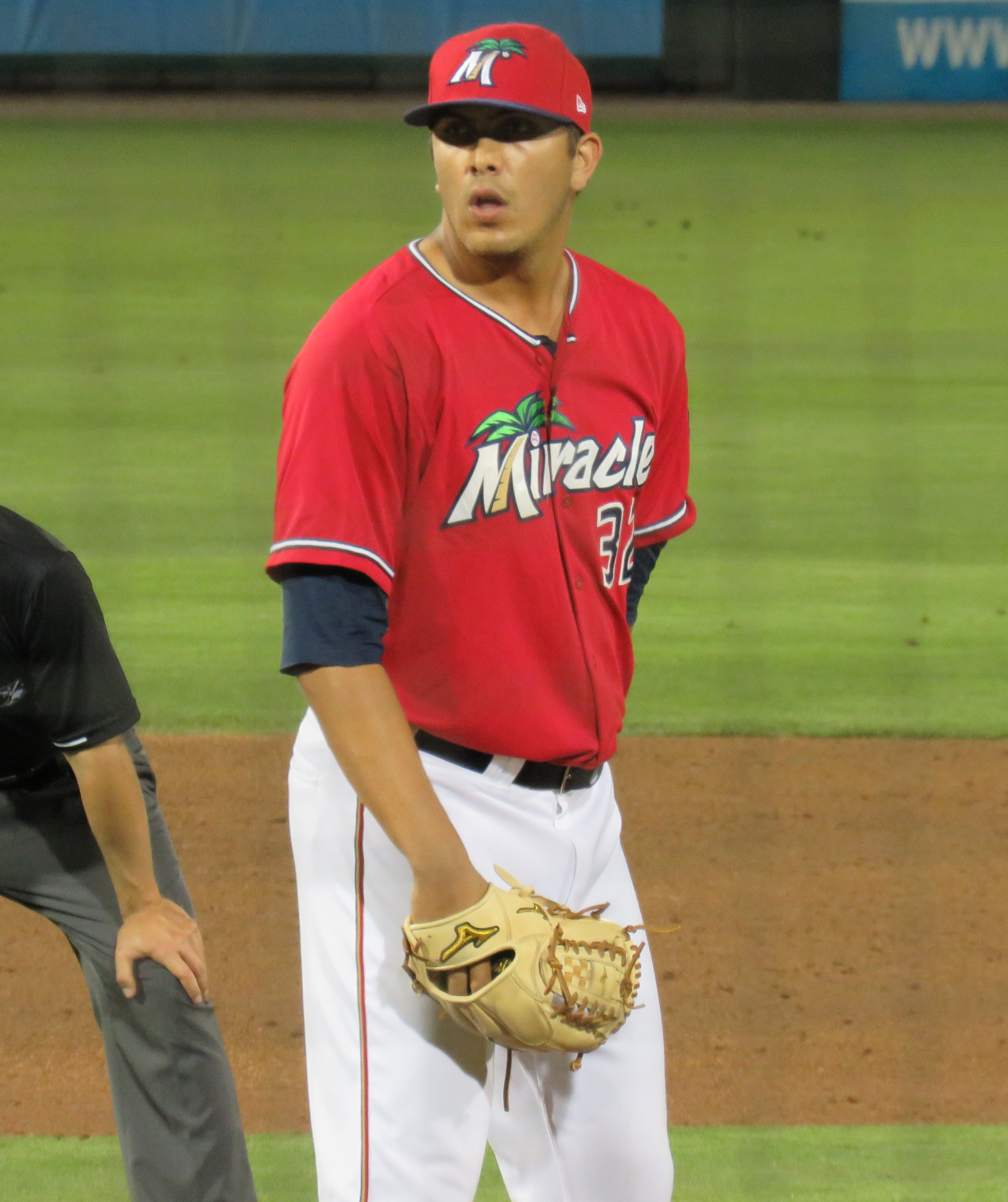
- Vasquez with the Fort Myers Miracle

Tecolotes de los Dos Laredos – No. 31
- Pitcher
- Born: September 14, 1993 (age 33); Rancho Cucamonga, California, U.S.
- Bats: Left Throws: Left

MLB debut
- September 1, 2018, for the Minnesota Twins

MLB statistics (through 2023 season)
- Win–loss record: 3–1
- Earned run average: 4.24
- Strikeouts: 63
- Stats at Baseball Reference

Teams
- Minnesota Twins (2018–2019); Los Angeles Dodgers (2021); Toronto Blue Jays (2022); San Francisco Giants (2022); Philadelphia Phillies (2023); Detroit Tigers (2023)

Andrew Jude Vasquez (born September 14, 1993) is an American professional baseball pitcher for the Tecolotes de los Dos Laredos of the Mexican League. He has previously played in Major League Baseball (MLB) for the Minnesota Twins, Los Angeles Dodgers, Toronto Blue Jays, San Francisco Giants, Philadelphia Phillies, and Detroit Tigers. Vasquez played college baseball for the University of California, Santa Barbara and Westmont College. He was drafted by the Minnesota Twins in the 32nd round of the 2015 MLB draft.

== Early life and education ==
Vasquez attended Los Osos High School in Rancho Cucamonga, California. He was drafted by the Kansas City Royals in the 44th round of the 2011 Major League Baseball draft, but did not sign and played college baseball at the University of California, Santa Barbara and Westmont College.

== Career ==
=== Minnesota Twins ===
Vasquez was drafted by the Minnesota Twins in the 32nd round, with the 950th overall selection, of the 2015 Major League Baseball draft and signed. He made his professional debut with the Rookie-level Gulf Coast League Twins, recording a 2.92 ERA with 22 strikeouts across 12 1/3 innings pitched.

Vasquez split the 2016 season between the Low–A Elizabethton Twins and Single–A Cedar Rapids Kernels. He accumulated a 3–0 record with a 1.41 ERA and 51 strikeouts over 38 innings of work. Vasquez split his 2017 season between Cedar Rapids and the High–A Fort Myers Miracle, accumulating a 4–1 record with a 1.55 ERA and 85 strikeouts in 57 1/3 innings pitched. He played for the Surprise Saguaros of the Arizona Fall League during the 2017 offseason.

Vasquez split his 2018 minor league season between Fort Myers, the Double-A Chattanooga Lookouts, and the Triple-A Rochester Red Wings. In 40 appearances for the three affiliates, he accumulated a 1–2 record with a 1.30 ERA and 108 strikeouts across 69 1/3 innings.

On September 1, 2018, Vasquez was selected to the 40-man roster and promoted to the major leagues for the first time. In nine appearances during his rookie campaign, Vasquez compiled a 1-0 record and 5.40 ERA with seven strikeouts across five innings of work.

Vasquez made one appearance for Minnesota, allowing three runs without recording an out against the New York Mets on April 10, 2019. On July 4, he was removed from the 40-man roster and sent outright to Triple-A Rochester. In his minor league season, Vasquez spent time with the GCL Twins, the Double-A Pensacola Blue Wahoos, and Rochester, registering a cumulative 2-3 record and 5.40 ERA with 51 strikeouts in 36 2/3 innings pitched across 30 appearances.

Vasquez did not play in a game in 2020 due to the cancellation of the minor league season because of the COVID-19 pandemic. He returned to action in 2021 with the Triple-A St. Paul Saints, and posted a 4-0 record with a 3.61 ERA and 68 strikeouts in 42 1/3 innings pitched across 33 appearances.

=== Los Angeles Dodgers ===
On August 31, 2021, Vasquez was traded to the Los Angeles Dodgers in exchange for Stevie Berman. He was added to the major league roster on September 2. Vasquez only pitched 1 2/3 innings for Los Angeles, appearing in two games. He allowed one run on one hit while striking out three batters in those games. Vasquez also pitched six innings for the Triple-A Oklahoma City Dodgers and allowed two runs on six hits. On November 30, Vasquez was non-tendered by the Dodgers, making him a free agent.

=== Toronto Blue Jays ===
On March 15, 2022, Vasquez signed a one-year, $800,000 contract with the Toronto Blue Jays. He posted an 8.10 ERA with six strikeouts in 6 2/3 innings of relief for the team before he suffered an ankle sprain. Vasquez spent time in rehabilitation with the Triple-A Buffalo Bisons and rookie-level Florida Complex League Blue Jays.

=== Philadelphia Phillies ===
On August 2, 2022, Vasquez was claimed off waivers by the Philadelphia Phillies. He made four appearances for the Triple-A Lehigh Valley IronPigs, posting a 2.25 ERA with three strikeouts across four innings. Vasquez was designated for assignment by Philadelphia on August 15.

=== San Francisco Giants ===
On August 17, 2022, Vasquez was claimed off waivers by the San Francisco Giants. He was designated for assignment by the team on August 31, following the promotion of Andrew Knapp. Vasquez cleared waivers and was sent outright to the Triple–A Sacramento River Cats on September 1. In 14 games for Sacramento, he recorded a 5–0 record and 2.20 ERA with 23 strikeouts in 16 1/3 innings pitched. On October 3, the Giants selected Vasquez's contract to the major league roster. He logged two scoreless innings in San Francisco's season finale against the San Diego Padres, recording four strikeouts.

=== Philadelphia Phillies (second stint) ===
On November 9, 2022, Vasquez was claimed off waivers by the Philadelphia Phillies. In 2023, he made 30 appearances for Philadelphia, registering a 2.27 ERA with 34 strikeouts in 39 2/3 innings pitched. Despite the strong results, Vasquez was designated for assignment by the Phillies on August 2, 2023.

=== Detroit Tigers ===
On August 4, 2023, Vasquez was claimed off waivers by the Detroit Tigers. In 12 appearances for Detroit, he struggled to an 8.31 ERA with 9 strikeouts in 8 2/3 innings of work. Following the season on November 6, Vasquez was removed from the 40–man roster and sent outright to the Triple–A Toledo Mud Hens. He elected minor league free agency the next day.

On January 4, 2024, Vasquez re-signed with the Tigers on a minor league contract. In 48 appearances for Toledo, he compiled a 7-3 record and 5.11 ERA with 63 strikeouts across 68 2/3 innings pitched. Vasquez elected free agency following the season on November 4.

=== Tecolotes de los Dos Laredos ===
On February 22, 2025, Vasquez signed with the Tecolotes de los Dos Laredos of the Mexican League. Vasquez made seven scoreless appearances for Dos Laredos, recording six strikeouts and three saves across 7 2/3 innings pitched.

=== Los Angeles Angels ===
On May 6, 2025, Vasquez signed a minor league contract with the Los Angeles Angels. In 12 appearances split between the rookie-level Arizona Complex League Angels and Triple-A Salt Lake Bees, he posted a 1-0 record and 5.28 ERA with 16 strikeouts across 15 1/3 innings pitched. Vasquez was released by the Angels organization on June 17.

=== Tecolotes de los Dos Laredos (second stint) ===
On June 26, 2025, Vasquez signed with the Tecolotes de los Dos Laredos of the Mexican League. In 27 games 28 innings of relief he went 0-1 with a 1.29 ERA with 34 strikeouts and 4 saves.
