= Bryson Stott =

American baseball player (born 1997)

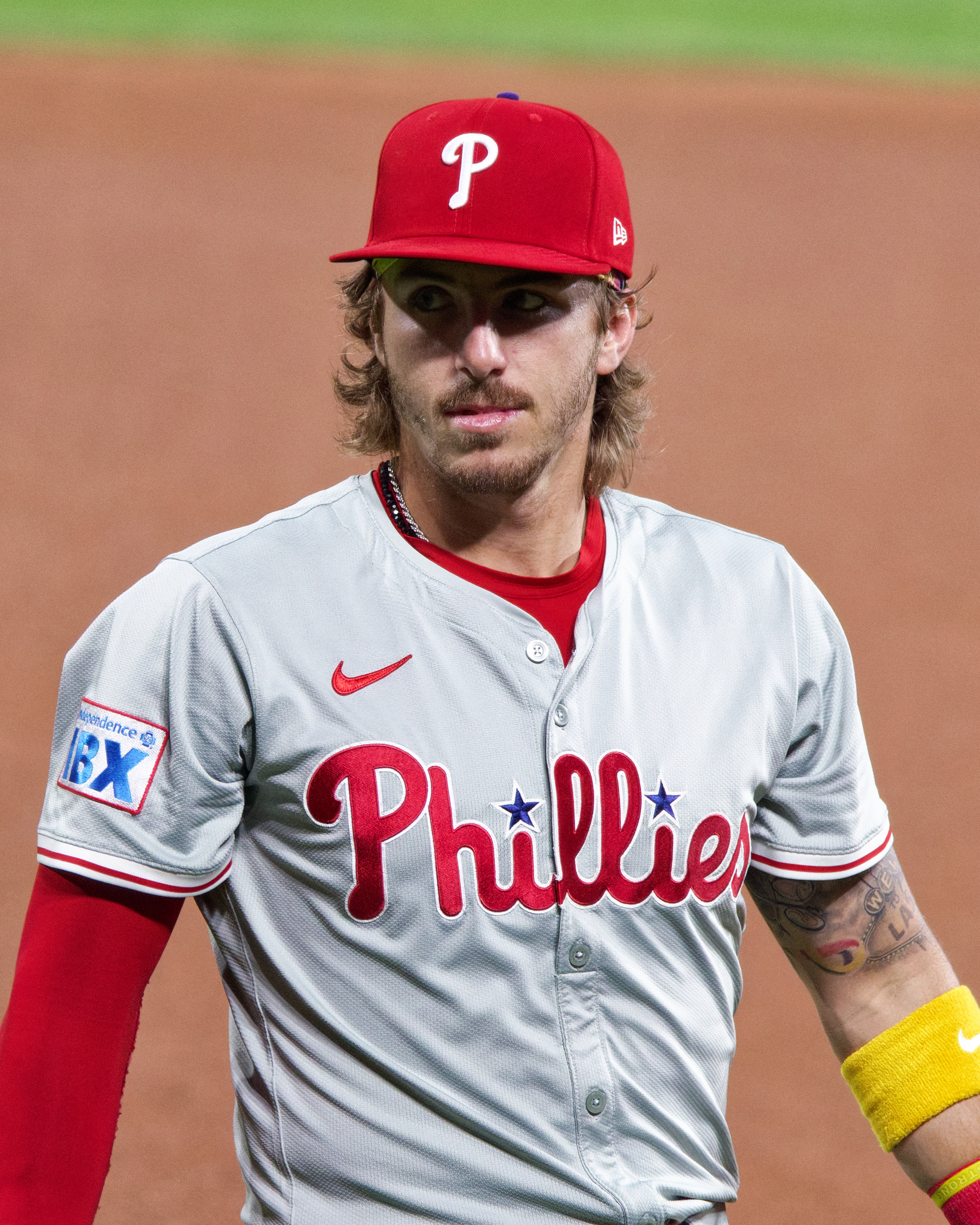
- Stott with the Phillies in 2024

Philadelphia Phillies – No. 5
- Shortstop / Second baseman
- Born: October 6, 1997 (age 29); Las Vegas, Nevada, U.S.
- Bats: Left Throws: Right

MLB debut
- April 8, 2022, for the Philadelphia Phillies

MLB statistics (through 2026 season)
- Batting average: .256
- Home runs: 59
- Runs batted in: 301
- Stolen bases: 126
- Stats at Baseball Reference

Teams
- Philadelphia Phillies (2022–present)

Bryson Jeremy Stott (born October 6, 1997) is an American professional baseball second baseman for the Philadelphia Phillies of Major League Baseball (MLB). He played college baseball at UNLV, and was selected by the Phillies in the first round of the 2019 Major League Baseball draft. He made his MLB debut in 2022.

== Amateur career ==
Stott attended Desert Oasis High School in Enterprise, Nevada. He committed to University of Las Vegas (UNLV) to play college baseball. Both of Stott's parents attended UNLV and Stott's father played quarterback for the school's football team.

As a freshman at UNLV, Stott started all 54 games at shortstop, hitting .294/.359/.379 with one home run and 29 runs batted in (RBIs). In 2017, Stott played summer collegiate baseball with the Wisconsin Rapids Rafters of the Northwoods League. He played in 71 games with the Rafters, batting .352 with a league-leading 100 hits. He tallied three home runs, 17 doubles and 51 RBI. He stole 26 bases, walked 49 times, and scored 72 times. He was selected by MLB scouts to participate in that season's Major League Dreams Showcase and played in the Northwoods League playoffs.

As a sophomore in 2018, he started all 59 games, hitting .365/.442/.556 with four home runs, 32 RBI and an NCAA leading 30 doubles. After the season, he played for the Wareham Gatemen of the Cape Cod Baseball League and the United States collegiate national team. In 2019, his junior year, he batted .356 with ten home runs and 36 RBIs over 58 games.

== Professional career ==
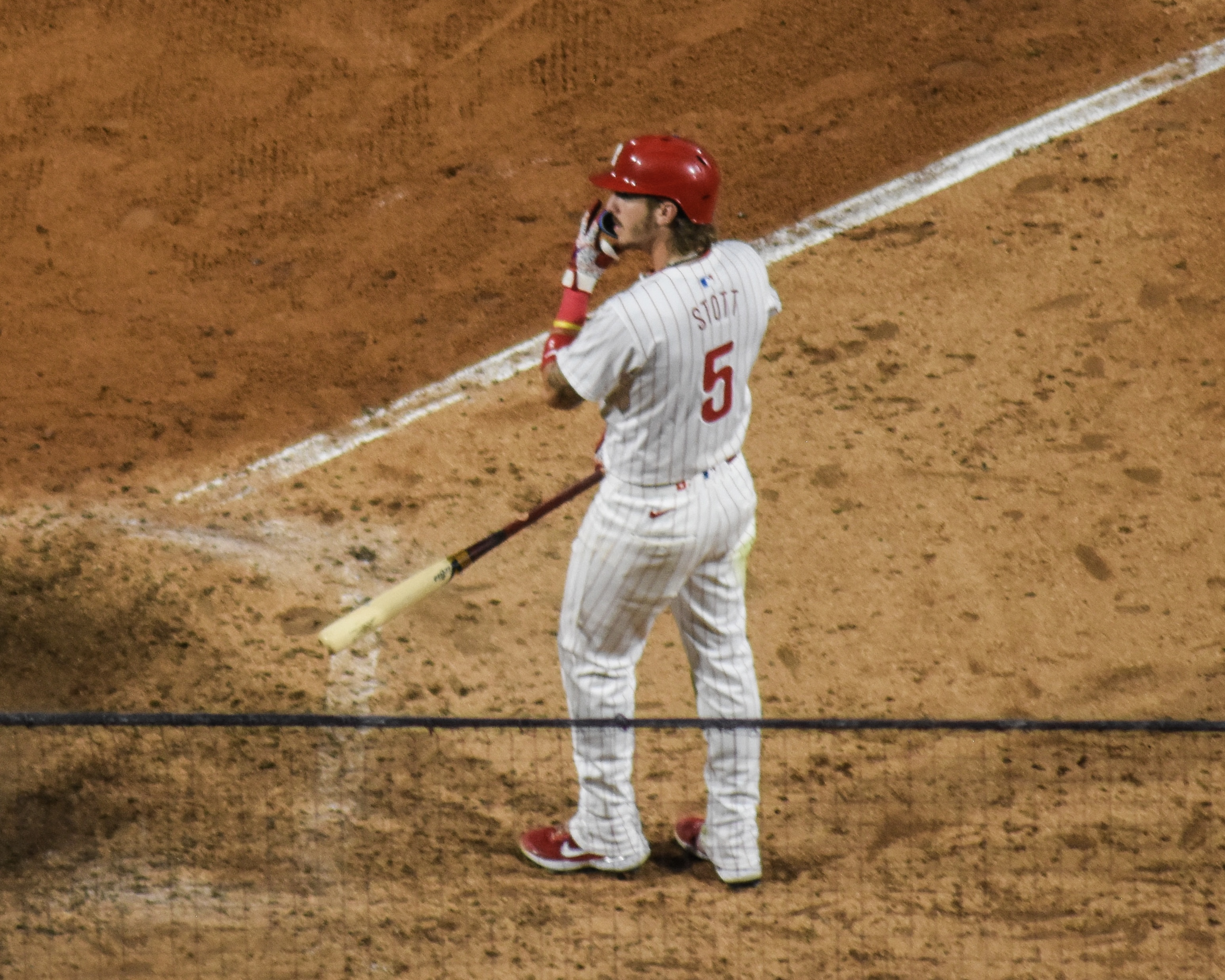
Stott preparing to bat for the Phillies in Citizens Bank Park on July 29, 2024.

Stott was considered one of the top prospects for the 2019 Major League Baseball draft. He was selected by the Philadelphia Phillies with the 14th overall pick. Stott signed with the Phillies on June 27, 2019, after agreeing to a $3.9 million signing bonus.

Stott made his professional debut with the Rookie-level Gulf Coast League Phillies before earning a promotion to the Williamsport Crosscutters of the Class A Short Season New York–Penn League. Over 48 games between the two teams, he slashed .295/.391/.494 with six home runs and 27 RBIs. To begin the 2021 season, he was assigned to the Jersey Shore BlueClaws of the High-A East. In June 2021, Stott was selected to play in the All-Star Futures Game. He earned promotions to the Reading Fightin Phils of the Double-A Northeast and the Lehigh Valley IronPigs of the Triple-A East during the season. Over 112 games between the three teams, Stott slashed .299/.390/.486 with 16 home runs and 49 RBIs. He was selected to play in the Arizona Fall League for the Peoria Javelinas following the season's end.

After impressing manager Joe Girardi during spring training, Stott was named to the Phillies' Opening Day roster for the 2022 season. He made his major league debut on April 8, 2022, recording a single, a double, and an RBI in the Phillies' 9–5 victory over the Oakland Athletics. After not starting a game since April 18 and being hitless in his last 18 at-bats, he was optioned to Lehigh Valley on April 25 in order to receive consistent playing time.

After returning to the Phillies, he hit his first career home run off Chase Silseth against the Los Angeles Angels on June 3; a three-run homer in the second inning during the 10–0 win. Two days later, against the Angels, Stott hit a walk-off three-run home run off Jimmy Herget on a 3–2 count with two outs on June 5 to defeat them, 9–7. Despite a slow start to the season, in which he batted .188/.255/.307, Stott heated up after the All-Star Game, hitting .276/.331/.404 in the second half of the season.

In the 2022 regular season he batted .234/.295/.358 in 427 at bats. He played 83 games at shortstop, 47 at second base, and two at third base.

With the departure of second baseman Jean Segura and the acquisition of shortstop Trea Turner over the offseason, Stott became the everyday second baseman for the Phillies in 2023. He began the 2023 campaign by hitting safely in each of the first seventeen contests. His first-inning leadoff single to center field off Lance Lynn in a 7–4 win over the Chicago White Sox in the first game of a doubleheader at Guaranteed Rate Field on April 18 set a new Phillies record, surpassing the 16-game hit streak established in 1950 by Willie "Puddin' Head" Jones. Stott appeared in 151 games in his second season in the majors, batting .280/.329/.419 with 15 home runs and 62 RBIs. In Game 2 of the 2023 National League Wild Card Series against the Miami Marlins, Stott hit his first career grand slam, and the second postseason grand slam in Phillies franchise history, joining Shane Victorino.

== Personal life ==
Stott is married to certified personal trainer and nutrition coach, Dru Stott (née White). Stott has three children.
