= Edmundo Sosa =

Panamanian baseball player (born 1996)

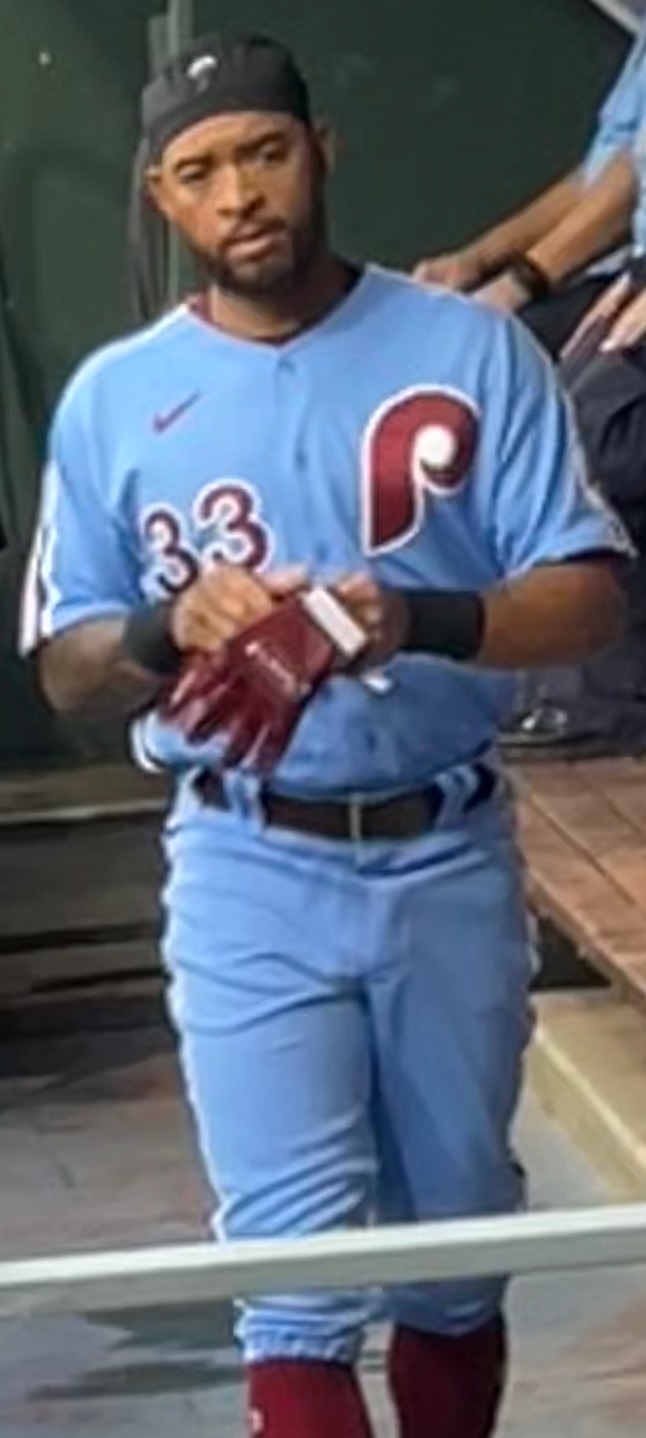
- Sosa with the Phillies in 2022

Free agent
- Infielder
- Born: March 6, 1996 (age 30); Panama City, Panama
- Bats: Right Throws: Right

MLB debut
- September 23, 2018, for the St. Louis Cardinals

MLB statistics (through 2026 season)
- Batting average: .256
- Home runs: 45
- Runs batted in: 192
- Stats at Baseball Reference

Teams
- St. Louis Cardinals (2018–2019, 2021–2022); Philadelphia Phillies (2022–2026)

Edmundo Israel Sosa (born March 6, 1996) is a Panamanian professional baseball infielder who is a free agent. He has played in Major League Baseball (MLB) for the St. Louis Cardinals and Philadelphia Phillies. He signed with the Cardinals as an international free agent in 2012 and made his MLB debut with in 2018.

== Career ==
=== St. Louis Cardinals ===
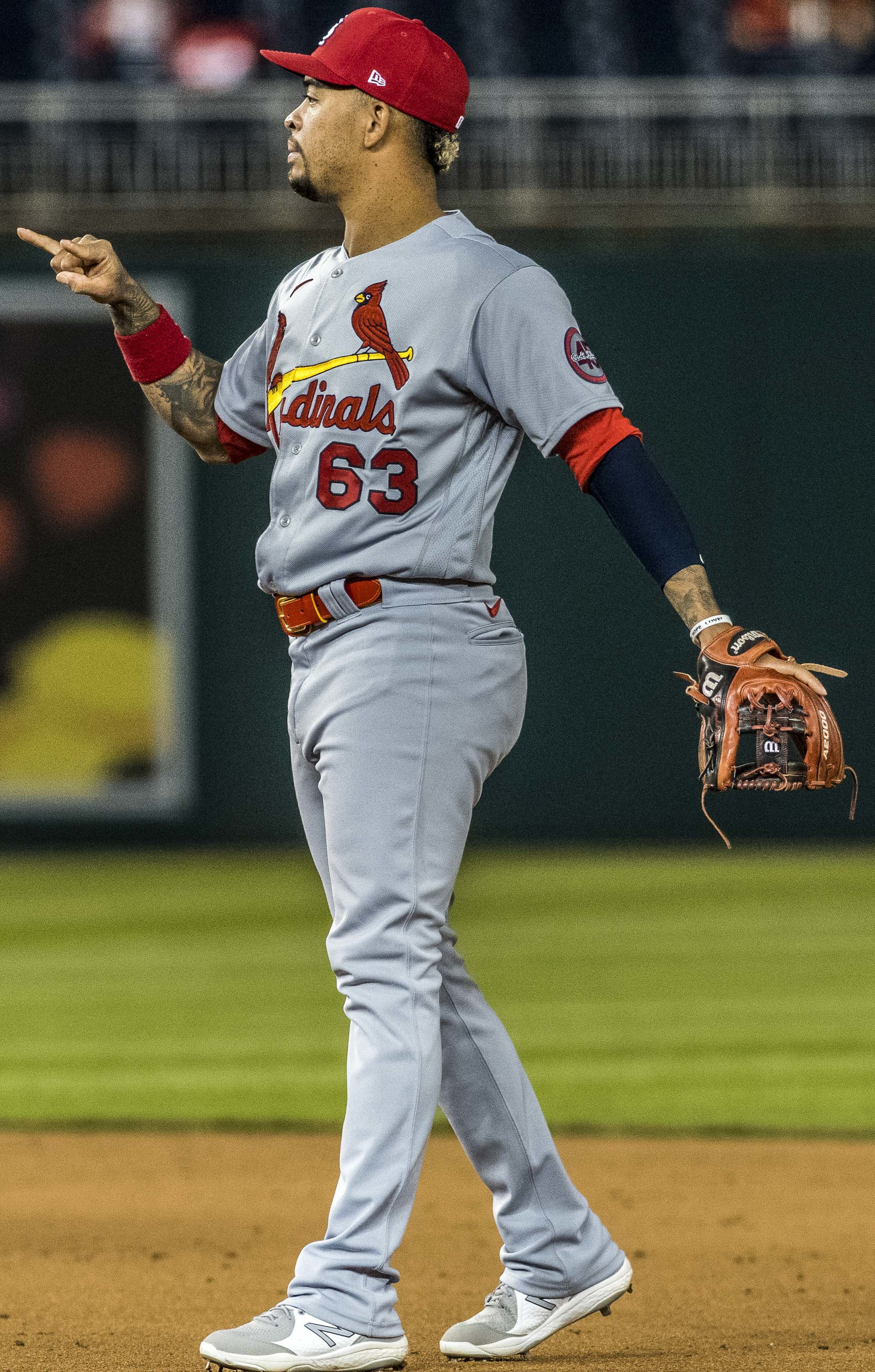
Sosa with the Cardinals in 2021

Sosa signed with the St. Louis Cardinals as an international free agent on July 2, 2012. He made his professional debut in 2013 with the Dominican Summer League Cardinals and spent the whole season there, batting .314 with three home runs and 27 RBI in 47 games. He played for both the Gulf Coast Cardinals and State College Spikes in 2014, batting a combined .274 with one home run and 23 RBI in 55 total games between both teams, and he played with the Johnson City Cardinals in 2015, slashing .300/.369/.485 with seven home runs and 16 RBI in 49 games.

In 2016, Sosa played for the Panama national baseball team in the 2017 World Baseball Classic qualifiers. Sosa spent 2016 with both the Peoria Chiefs, with whom he was named a Midwest League All-Star, and the Palm Beach Cardinals, and he finished 2016 batting a combined .270 with three home runs and 34 RBI in 97 total games between both teams. The Cardinals added him to their 40-man roster after the season. Sosa's 2017 season was limited due to injury; he played in only 58 games, posting a .288 batting average with one home run and 16 RBI. After the season, the Cardinals assigned Sosa to the Surprise Saguaros of the Arizona Fall League (AFL). Sosa appeared in 17 total games in the AFL, batting .305 with seven RBI, along with a .715 OPS. He began 2018 with the Springfield Cardinals before being promoted to the Memphis Redbirds. In 123 games between the two affiliates, Sosa hit .270 with 12 home runs and 59 RBI.

Sosa was promoted to the major leagues on September 23, 2018, and he made his debut that night. In 2019, he began the year with Memphis and was recalled by St. Louis for the first time on July 16. On August 4, 2020, it was announced that Sosa had tested positive for COVID-19, and he was subsequently placed on the injured list.

In 2021, Sosa made the Cardinals' Opening Day roster. He received limited playing time until he took over at shortstop after Paul DeJong was placed on the injured list in mid-May. On June 4, 2021, Sosa hit his first career home run, a solo home run off of Cincinnati Reds starter Luis Castillo. For the 2021 season, Sosa made 288 at-bats over 113 games, slashing .271/.346/.389 with six home runs and 27 RBI.

=== Philadelphia Phillies ===
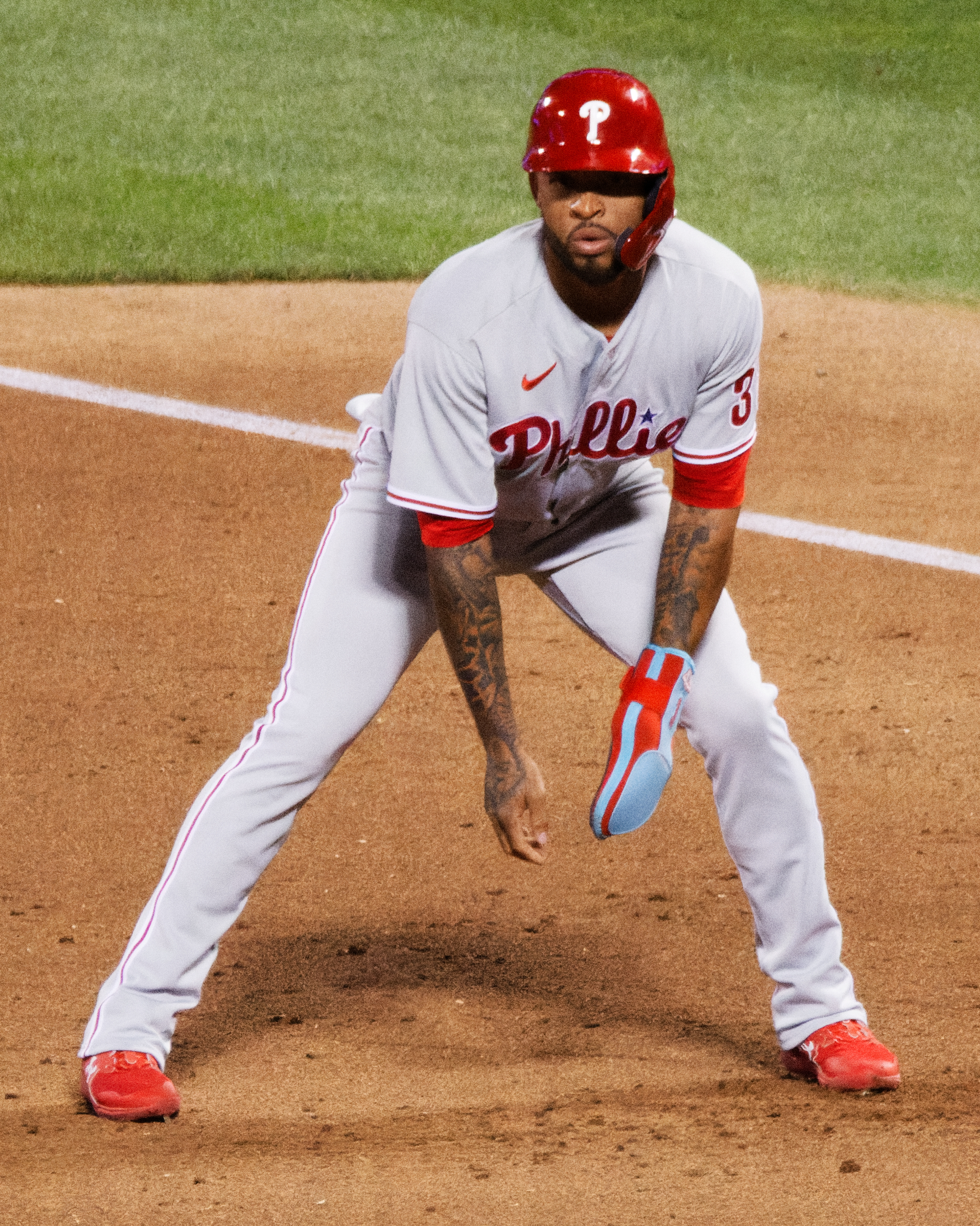
Sosa with the Phillies in 2022

On July 30, 2022, the Cardinals traded Sosa to the Philadelphia Phillies in exchange for JoJo Romero. In the 2022 regular season, with the two teams combined he batted .227/.275/.369 in 176 at-bats, with two home runs and six steals in seven attempts. He played 42 games at shortstop, and 22 games at third base.

In the ninth inning of game one of the 2022 National League Wild Card Series, between the Phillies and St. Louis Cardinals, Sosa scored a crucial insurance run in the top of the ninth inning. The Phillies went on to win the game by a score of 6–3. In game two, with his team up 2–0, Sosa caught a fly ball off the bat of Tommy Edman in foul territory to record the final out of the game and secure the series win for the Phillies.

On January 13, 2023, Sosa agreed to a one-year, $950,000 contract with the Phillies, avoiding salary arbitration. Sosa and the Phillies agreed to a $1.7 million salary for the 2024 season. On August 1, 2024, Sosa was announced as a preliminary winner of the Heart & Hustle Award.

On September 24, 2025, Sosa hit three home runs in an 11–1 victory over the Miami Marlins.
