= Bobby Dickerson =

American baseball coach (born 1965)

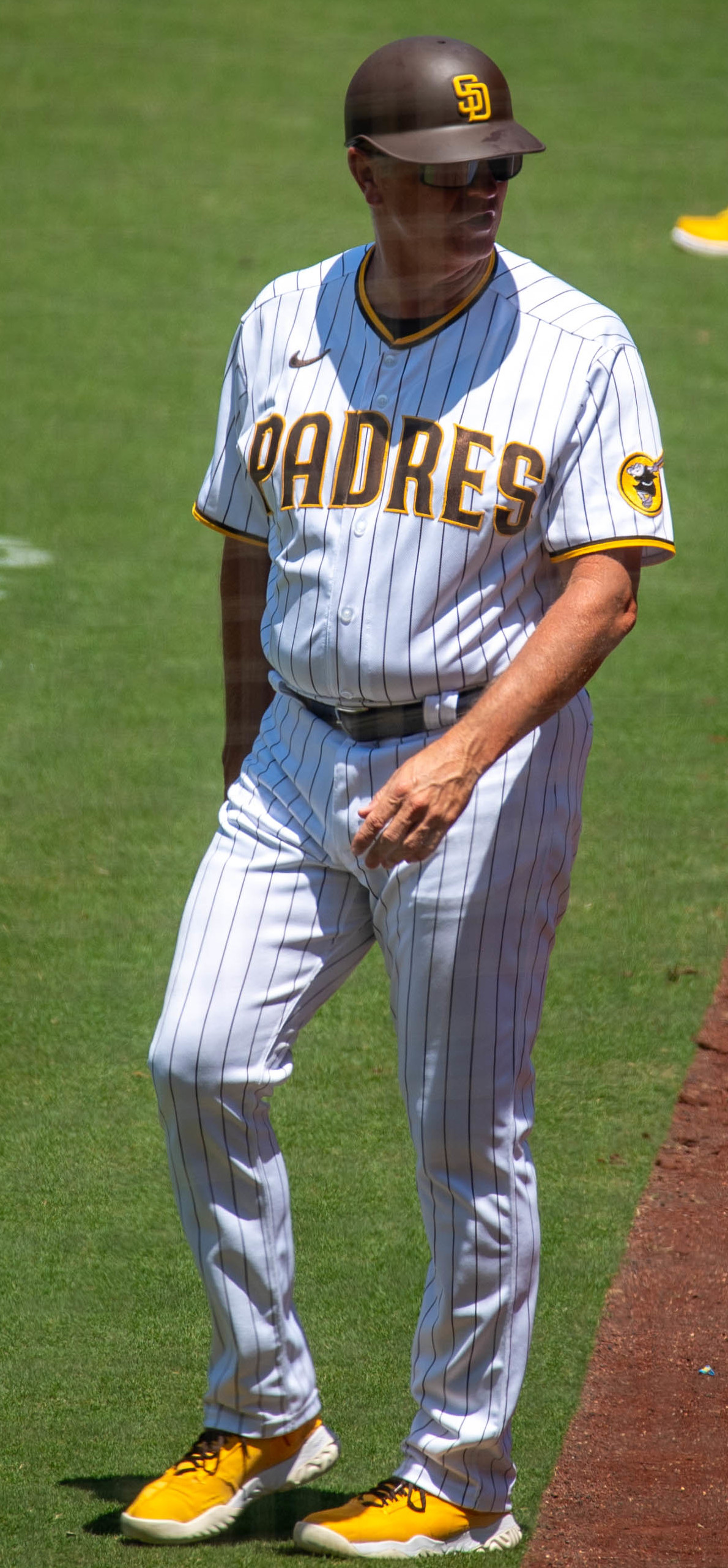
- Dickerson with the Padres in 2021

Philadelphia Phillies – No. 9
- Infielder / Coach
- Born: September 4, 1965 (age 61); Laurel, Mississippi, U.S.
- Bats: Right Throws: Right
- Stats at Baseball Reference

Teams
- Baltimore Orioles (2011–2018); Philadelphia Phillies (2019, 2022–present); San Diego Padres (2020–2021)

Robert Dale Dickerson (born September 4, 1965) is an American professional baseball player and coach. Dickerson played for the Yankees' and Orioles' minor league affiliates from 1987 through 1993. He is the infield coach for the Philadelphia Phillies of Major League Baseball (MLB).

== Playing career ==
Dickerson was born in Laurel, Mississippi. He was drafted by the New York Yankees in the 23rd round of the 1987 Major League Baseball draft out of Nicholls State University in Louisiana. He obtained his Nicholls State diploma in 2018.

Dickerson played for the Yankees' and Orioles' minor league affiliates from 1987 through 1993. He played 207 games at shortstop, 144 games at second base, 58 games at third base, and 15 games at first base.

== Managing and coaching career ==
Dickerson managed the Bluefield (A) Orioles from 1996-97, and was the Baltimore Orioles' minor league infield instructor from 1994-97.

From 1998–99, Dickerson was the infield instructor for the Arizona Diamondbacks. In 2000, Dickerson managed the Diamondbacks' single-A team.

He managed Chicago's double-A affiliate the West Tenn Diamond Jaxx from 2002–05. Dickerson spent 2006-08 as an infield and bunting coordinator in the Cubs system. In 2006, Dickerson served as interim manager of the Iowa Cubs when Mike Quade was promoted to Chicago to coach third base. That year, the Cubs posted a 6–5 record under Dickerson. In 2009 he became Iowa's 15th manager since their affiliation with the Cubs began in 1981.

In 2010 he served as the Orioles Minor League Infield Coordinator/Latin America Field Coordinator in the Dominican Republic, and the Norfolk Tides interim manager. Dickerson took over as Orioles bullpen coach on August 15, 2011. On December 13, 2012, he was named the Orioles' third base coach.

In January 2019, the Philadelphia Phillies hired him to be their infield coach.

On December 5, 2019, Dickerson was named the bench coach for the San Diego Padres. After the retirement of Glenn Hoffman, Dickerson also assumed the role of third base coach, in addition to his duties as bench coach, for the Padres during the 2021 season.

On October 25, 2021, the Phillies hired Dickerson as their infield coach.
