= MLB Little League Classic =

Special Major League Baseball event

- Venue: Bowman Field
- Locations: Williamsport, Pennsylvania, U.S.
- Years active: 2017–2019, 2021–present
- Inaugurated: August 20, 2017; 9 years ago
- Previous event: August 23, 2026
- Next event: August 19, 2027
- Participants: Chicago Cubs, Toronto Blue Jays (2027)
- Organizer: Major League Baseball
- Sponsor: GEICO (2018–2023); New York Life (2024–2025)

Logo used during 2021–2023

The MLB Little League Classic is an annual Major League Baseball (MLB) specialty game played on the Sunday between August 17 and 23 (inclusive) in Williamsport, Pennsylvania, during the Little League World Series, first contested during the 2017 edition of that event. The series is part of MLB's effort to get more children interested in and involved with baseball at a younger age.

== Background ==
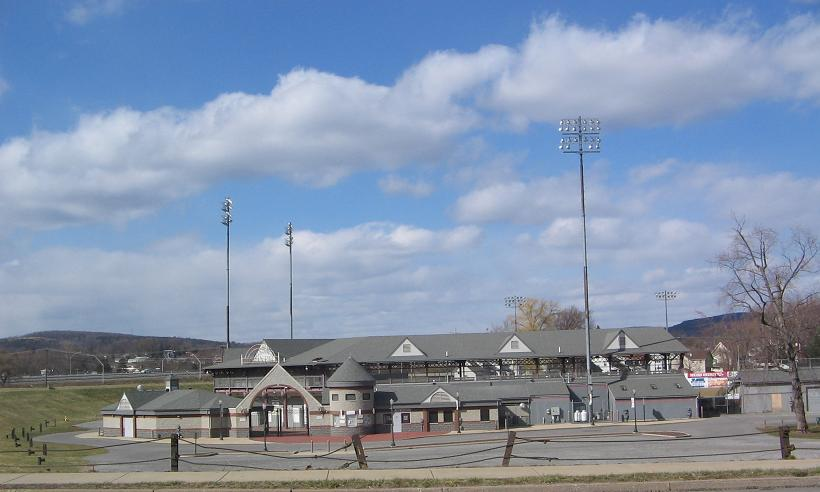
Exterior view of Bowman Field

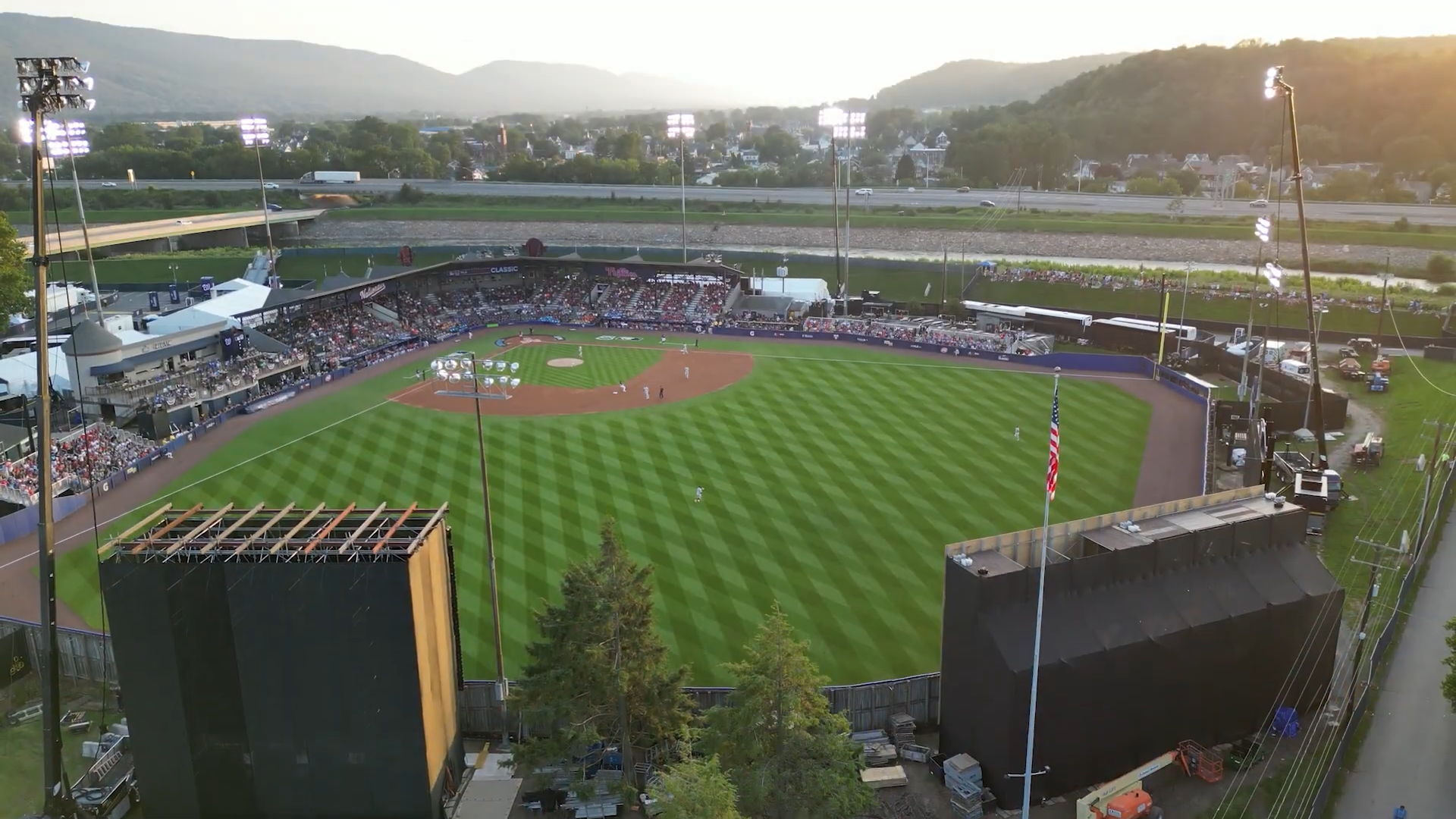
Bowman Field during the 2023 game

After the success of the Fort Bragg Game between the Miami Marlins and Atlanta Braves at Fort Bragg, North Carolina, in July 2016, reports spread that MLB was planning another similar event in Williamsport, Pennsylvania, which is the venue town for the annual Little League World Series and home to the Williamsport Crosscutters, then of Minor League Baseball. Many locals of the area and reporters across the nation thought it was almost impossible due to the size and capacity of Bowman Field, as seating for fewer than 3,000 fans seems much less than ideal for an MLB game. As the reports were dispelled by many, the news faded. However, a St. Louis Post-Dispatch column in early March 2017 stated that MLB was finalizing plans for the game.

On March 9, 2017, MLB officially announced the first MLB Little League Classic, selecting the Pittsburgh Pirates and St. Louis Cardinals as the participants, and released the following statement:

Major League Baseball's greatest responsibility is to ensure that today's youth become active participants in our game as players and fans. The 'MLB Little League Classic' exemplifies our entire sport's commitment to building a stronger connection between young people and the National Pastime. Our players will honor the great tradition of the Little League World Series and create lifelong memories for the Little Leaguers, their families and the city of Williamsport. I thank the Pirates and the Cardinals, Little League Baseball, Governor Wolf, the Crosscutters, the City of Williamsport, and ESPN for helping us organize an unforgettable weekend.

— Rob Manfred, Commissioner of Baseball

Prior to the inaugural game, funding from both MLB and also grants from the Commonwealth of Pennsylvania given to the City of Williamsport provided more than $4 million to improve Bowman Field. These included adding new seats, padding around the infield fence, new irrigation and draining to the field itself, moving the bullpens out beyond the outfield fence, new dugouts closer to home plate, and improved dining areas.

== Games and results ==
=== 2017 ===
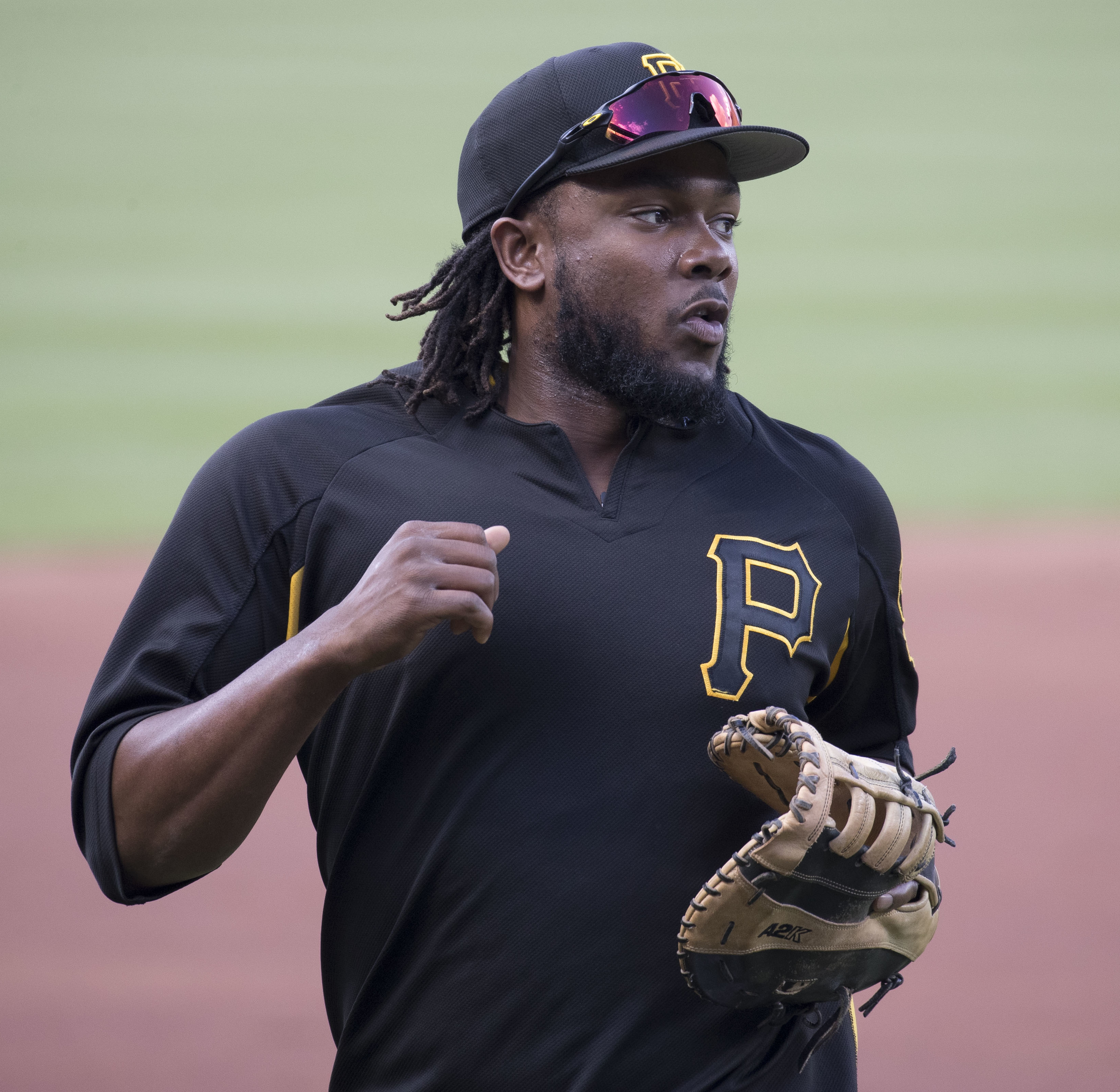
Josh Bell had four RBIs in the 2017 game.

The Pirates defeated the Cardinals, 6–3, in the first Classic, played on August 20, 2017. Residents from Lycoming County were eligible to win a very limited number of tickets to the game via a lottery system found on the MLB website. The game was originally scheduled to be a home game for the Pirates; ticket holders for that game were offered a food-and-beverage credit, tickets to another game, or a refund. The Cardinals and Pirates wore special uniforms, including features such as pullover jerseys with bright colors and contrasting sleeves, specially colored caps, and a unique logo that drew design cues from the official logos of both MLB and Little League Baseball. In addition, players were encouraged (although not required) to put nicknames on the jerseys' rear nameplates. These uniforms were worn again by both teams on August 25–27 for Players Weekend, an initiative of MLB and the Major League Baseball Players Association that saw all 30 MLB teams wear similar uniforms.

August 20, 2017 7:08 p.m. EDT at BB&T Park at Bowman Field
Team	1	2	3	4	5	6	7	8	9	R	H	E
St. Louis	0	2	0	0	0	1	0	0	0	3	11	0
Pittsburgh	3	0	3	0	0	0	0	0	×	6	9	1
WP: Iván Nova (10–11) LP: Mike Leake (7–12) Sv: Felipe Vázquez (14); Home runs: STL: Jedd Gyorko (17); PIT: Josh Bell (21); Attendance: 2,596 Time: 2:58; Umpires: Gerry Davis, Ramon De Jesus, Pat Hoberg, Tony Randazzo

=== 2018 ===
In late September 2017, MLB announced that a second Classic would be held in 2018, between the New York Mets and Philadelphia Phillies. On August 19, 2018, the Mets won the second Classic, 8–2. The Phillies had last played at Bowman Field on July 31, 1962, when the team lost to the Williamsport Grays, the Phillies' Eastern League affiliate, in a mid-season exhibition game.

August 19, 2018 7:10 p.m. EDT at BB&T Park at Bowman Field
Team	1	2	3	4	5	6	7	8	9	R	H	E
New York (NL)	0	4	0	2	0	1	0	1	0	8	14	0
Philadelphia	0	0	0	0	0	2	0	0	0	2	8	0
WP: Jason Vargas (3–8) LP: Nick Pivetta (7–10); Home runs: NYM: None; PHI: Carlos Santana (18); Attendance: 2,429 Time: 3:11; Umpires: Chris Guccione, Jeremie Rehak, Mark Ripperger, Gerry Davis

=== 2019 ===
The third Classic was played on August 18, 2019, with the Chicago Cubs defeating the Pirates, 7–1. Chicago's uniforms for the game read "Cubbies" on the front, while Pittsburgh's read "The Burgh".

August 18, 2019 7:11 p.m. EDT at BB&T Park at Bowman Field
Team	1	2	3	4	5	6	7	8	9	R	H	E
Chicago (NL)	1	0	1	2	3	0	0	0	0	7	9	1
Pittsburgh	0	0	0	0	0	0	0	0	1	1	7	1
WP: José Quintana (11–7) LP: Mitch Keller (1–2); Home runs: CHC: Nick Castellanos (17), Jason Heyward (18), Anthony Rizzo (23); PIT: Starling Marte (21); Attendance: 2,503 Time: 3:20; Umpires: Stu Scheurwater, Alan Porter, Mark Wegner, Sean Barber

=== 2021 ===
A year after the postponement of the 2020 game, the 2021 game on August 22, the Cleveland Indians defeated the Los Angeles Angels, 3–0, became the first edition contested between American League teams and the fourth overall edition played. The teams were issued uniforms corresponding to the Little League regions they are based in: the Great Lakes Region for Cleveland and the West Region for Los Angeles. Joe Maddon, managing the Angels, had previously managed the Cubs in the 2019 edition of the game.

August 22, 2021 7:10 p.m. EDT at BB&T Park at Bowman Field
Team	1	2	3	4	5	6	7	8	9	R	H	E
Los Angeles (AL)	0	0	0	0	0	0	0	0	0	0	4	0
Cleveland	2	0	0	1	0	0	0	0	×	3	6	0
WP: Cal Quantrill (4–2) LP: José Suarez (5–7) Sv: Emmanuel Clase (18); Home runs: LAA: None; CLE: Amed Rosario (8); Attendance: 1,832 Time: 2:47; Umpires: Dan Bellino, Alan Porter, Chris Guccione, Sean Barber

=== 2022 ===
The fourth edition was announced for August 23, 2020, between the Boston Red Sox and the Baltimore Orioles, and was to be the first Classic with American League teams. The game was cancelled, due to the COVID-19 pandemic, with a Boston–Baltimore matchup in Williamsport later scheduled for 2022. The limited 60-game regular season schedule of the 2020 season did include a four-game series between the Red Sox and Orioles on August 20–23, which was played in its entirety at Oriole Park at Camden Yards.

The Red Sox and Orioles, originally scheduled to play during the 2020 season, played the fifth edition of the Classic on August 21, 2022. The teams wore standard uniforms. The Orioles won the game, 5–3, largely powered by a three-run double in the bottom of the eighth inning by Jorge Mateo.

August 21, 2022 7:10 p.m. EDT at Muncy Bank Ballpark at Bowman Field
Team	1	2	3	4	5	6	7	8	9	R	H	E
Boston	0	1	0	0	0	0	0	1	1	3	7	0
Baltimore	2	0	0	0	0	0	0	3	×	5	8	0
Starting pitchers: BOS: Nick Pivetta; BAL: Dean Kremer; WP: Cionel Pérez (7–1) LP: Matt Barnes (0–4) Sv: Félix Bautista (8); Home runs: BOS: Franchy Cordero (5), Xander Bogaerts (10); BAL: None; Attendance: 2,467 Time: 3:23; Umpires: Will Little, Alfonso Márquez, Todd Tichenor, Mike Estabrook

=== 2023 ===
The Washington Nationals hosted the Philadelphia Phillies in the sixth Classic on August 20, 2023. The teams again wore standard uniforms. The Nationals jumped out to a 4–0 lead in the first inning, and there was no other scoring until the Phillies scored three times in the ninth inning, for a 4–3 final in favor of Washington.

According to Nielsen, the game averaged 1,556,000 viewers and peaked at 1,738,000 viewers.

August 20, 2023 7:10 p.m. EDT at Muncy Bank Ballpark at Bowman Field
Team	1	2	3	4	5	6	7	8	9	R	H	E
Philadelphia	0	0	0	0	0	0	0	0	3	3	6	0
Washington	4	0	0	0	0	0	0	0	×	4	9	0
WP: Trevor Williams (6–7) LP: Zack Wheeler (9–6) Sv: Kyle Finnegan (21); Home runs: PHI: Jake Cave (5); WSH: None; Attendance: 2,473 Time: 2:26; Umpires: Sean Barber, Alan Porter, Jim Wolf, Nick Mahrley

=== 2024 ===
The seventh edition of the Classic was held on August 18, 2024, featuring the Detroit Tigers and New York Yankees. Detroit won in 10 innings, as Tigers center fielder Parker Meadows hit a walk-off single to drive in the winning run. It was the first edition of the Classic to require extra innings.

According to Nielsen, the game averaged 2,169,000 viewers and peaked at 2,369,000 viewers, making it the most watched Little League Classic game to that point.

August 18, 2024 7:10 p.m. EDT at Journey Bank Ballpark at Bowman Field
Team	1	2	3	4	5	6	7	8	9	10	R	H	E
New York (AL)	0	0	0	0	0	1	0	0	0	1	2	6	0
Detroit	0	0	0	0	0	0	0	0	1	2	3	8	0
Starting pitchers: NYY: Marcus Stroman; DET: Tarik Skubal; WP: Beau Brieske (2–3) LP: Mark Leiter Jr. (3–5); Attendance: 2,532 Time: 2:42; Umpires: Manny Gonzalez, Todd Tichenor, Cory Blaser, Nestor Ceja

=== 2025 ===
The eighth edition of the Classic took place on August 17, 2025, featuring the Seattle Mariners and the New York Mets in the first Classic interleague game. The Mariners made their first appearance in the Classic, while the Mets made their second, having previously appeared in 2018. The Mets defeated the Mariners 7–3.

August 17, 2025 7:10 p.m. EDT at Journey Bank Ballpark at Bowman Field
Team	1	2	3	4	5	6	7	8	9	R	H	E
Seattle	0	0	0	1	0	0	2	0	0	3	10	0
New York (NL)	0	3	0	0	4	0	0	0	×	7	14	0
WP: Clay Holmes (10–6) LP: George Kirby (8–6); Home runs: SEA: Cal Raleigh (47); NYM: Mark Vientos (8); Attendance: 2,518 Time: 2:58; Umpires: Nate Tomlinson, Bruce Dreckman, Mark Wegner, Shane Livensparger

=== 2026 ===
The ninth edition of the Classic took place on August 23, 2026, featuring the Atlanta Braves and the Milwaukee Brewers. Both teams made their first Little League Classic appearance. The Braves defeated the Brewers 4–2.

August 23, 2026 7:10 p.m. EDT at Journey Bank Ballpark at Bowman Field
Team	1	2	3	4	5	6	7	8	9	R	H	E
Atlanta	0	1	0	1	0	1	0	0	1	4	11	1
Milwaukee	0	0	1	0	0	0	0	1	0	2	11	1
WP: Tyler Mahle (5–10) LP: Shane Drohan (6–5) Sv: Raisel Iglesias (27); Home runs: ATL: Michael Harris II (21); MIL: None; Attendance: 2,432 Time: 3:02; Umpires: Adam Hamari, Clint Vondrak, Todd Tichenor, John Tumpane

=== 2027 ===
The tenth edition of the Classic is scheduled for August 19, 2027, with the Chicago Cubs and the Toronto Blue Jays. Like the rest of the 2027 MLB season, the game is contingent on MLB and the Major League Baseball Players Association (MLBPA) signing a new collective bargaining agreement (CBA) to replace that one that expires on December 1, 2026.

== List of games ==
All games have been part of ESPN's Sunday Night Baseball programming with scheduled 7 p.m. ET start times.

Season	Date	Designated visitor		Designated home team		Attendance	Umpires†				Ref.
Season	Date	Designated visitor		Designated home team		Attendance	HP	1B	2B	3B	Ref.
2017	August 20	St. Louis Cardinals	3	**Pittsburgh Pirates**	**6**	2,596	**Davis**	Drake	Hoberg	Randazzo	
2018	August 19	**New York Mets**	**8**	Philadelphia Phillies	2	2,429	Guccione	Rehak	Ripperger	**Davis**	
2019	August 18	**Chicago Cubs**	**7**	Pittsburgh Pirates	1	2,503	Scheurwater	Porter	**Wegner**	Barber	
2021	August 22	Los Angeles Angels	0	**Cleveland Indians**	**3**	1,832	**Bellino**	Porter	Guccione	Barber	
2022	August 21	Boston Red Sox	3	**Baltimore Orioles**	**5**	2,467	Little	**Márquez**	Tichenor	Estabrook	
2023	August 20	Philadelphia Phillies	3	**Washington Nationals**	**4**	2,473	Barber	**Porter**	Wolf	Mahrley	
2024	August 18	New York Yankees	2 (10)	**Detroit Tigers**	**3**	2,532	Gonzalez	**Tichenor**	Blaser	Ceja	
2025	August 17	Seattle Mariners	3	**New York Mets**	**7**	2,518	Tomlinson	Dreckman	**Wegner**	Livensparger	
2026	August 23	**Atlanta Braves**	**4**	Milwaukee Brewers	2	2,432	Hamari	Vondrak	**Tichenor**	Tumpane	
2027	August 19	Chicago Cubs		Toronto Blue Jays		TBD					

† Umpire name in bold text denotes crew chief.

== Broadcasting ==
=== Television ===
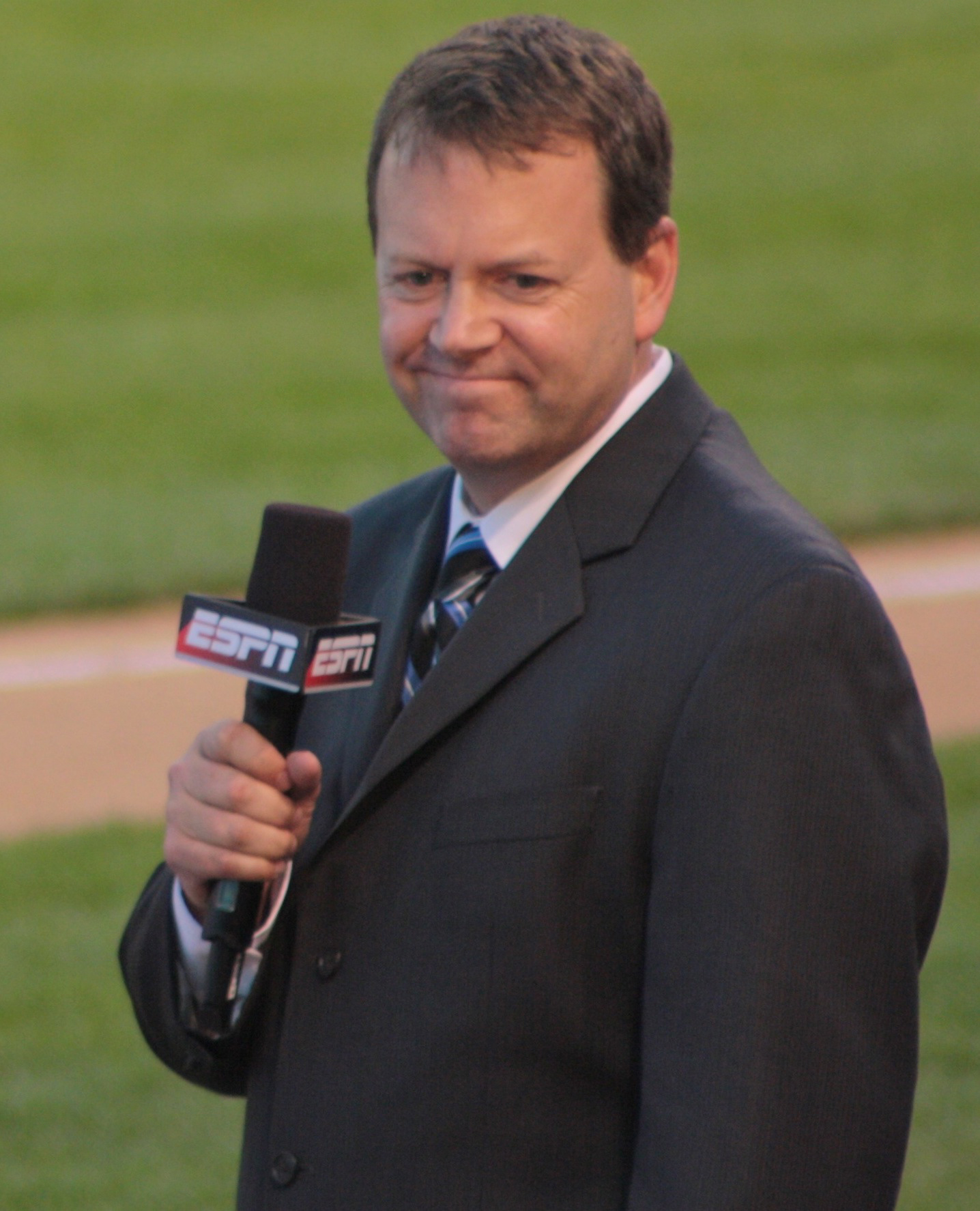
Buster Olney has been a reporter for the game since the 2018 edition.

The game was televised annually as a part of ESPN's Sunday Night Baseball, tying into the network's continuing coverage of the Little League World Series. In 2026, ESPN lost Sunday Night Baseball to NBC, but kept the rights to one Sunday night window for the Little League Classic. However, in 2027, MLB decided to move the Little League Classic to a Thursday playdate, in order for NBC to broadcast Sunday Night Baseball.

Season	Play-By-Play	Analyst(s)	Reporter	Ref.
2017	Dan Shulman	Aaron Boone & Jessica Mendoza	Tim Kurkjian	
2018	Matt Vasgersian	Jessica Mendoza & Alex Rodriguez	Buster Olney	
2019	Matt Vasgersian	Jessica Mendoza & Alex Rodriguez	Buster Olney	
2021	Matt Vasgersian	Alex Rodriguez	Buster Olney	
2022	Karl Ravech	Eduardo Pérez & David Cone	Buster Olney	
2023	Karl Ravech	Eduardo Pérez & David Cone	Buster Olney	
2024	Karl Ravech	Eduardo Pérez & David Cone	Buster Olney	
2025	Karl Ravech	Eduardo Pérez & David Cone	Buster Olney	
2026	Karl Ravech	Eduardo Pérez	Buster Olney	

=== Radio ===
As part of the Sunday Night Baseball, and the coverage after all games have been available on ESPN Radio nationwide.

Season	Play-By-Play	Analyst	Ref.
2017	Adam Amin	Chris Singleton	
2018	Mike Couzens	Jim Bowden	
2019	Mike Couzens	Chris Singleton	
2021	Karl Ravech	Tim Kurkjian	
2022	Dave O'Brien	Tim Kurkjian	
2023	Roxy Bernstein	Doug Glanville	
2024	Mike Couzens	Doug Glanville	
2025	Mike Couzens	Doug Glanville	
2026	Roxy Bernstein	Doug Glanville	

== See also ==
- List of neutral site regular season Major League Baseball games played in the United States and Canada
