= Todd Tichenor =

American baseball umpire (born 1976)

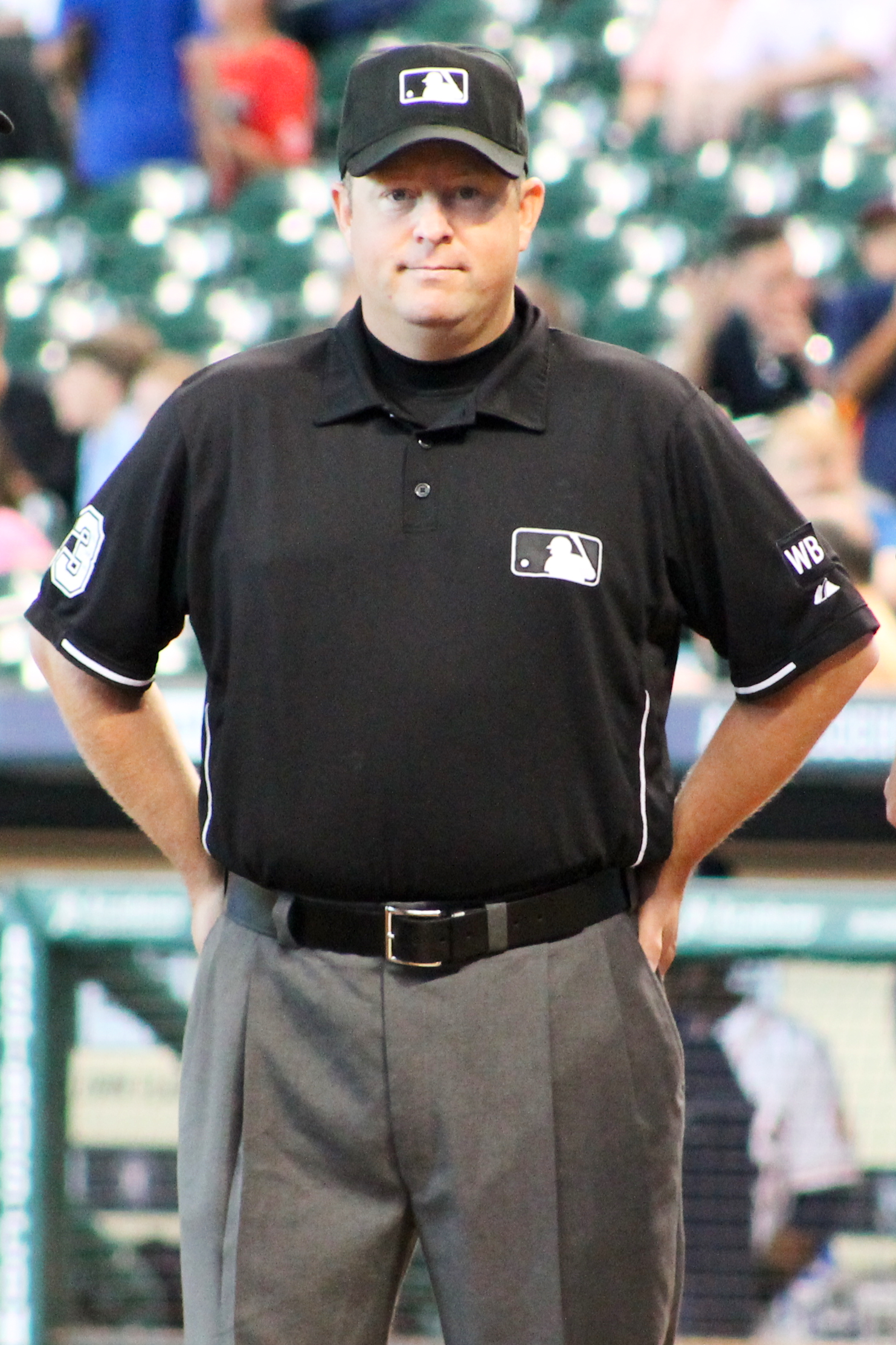
- Tichenor in 2014

MLB – No. 13
- Umpire
- Born: December 15, 1976 (age 49); Lincoln, Nebraska, U.S.

MLB debut
- June 8, 2007

Crew information
- Umpiring crew: Q
- Crew members: #13 Todd Tichenor (crew chief); #11 Tony Randazzo; #78 Adam Hamari; #15 Clint Vondrak

Career highlights and awards
- Special Assignments: All-Star Games (2014, 2023); Wild Card Games/Series (2014, 2020, 2022, 2025); Division Series (2015, 2016, 2018, 2019, 2020, 2023, 2024, 2026); League Championship Series (2017, 2021, 2022); World Series (2020, 2024); World Baseball Classic (2017, 2026); MLB Little League Classic (2022, 2024)

Todd Frederick Tichenor (born December 15, 1976) is an American professional baseball umpire. He became a Major League Baseball reserve umpire in 2007 and was promoted to the full-time MLB staff in 2012. He wore number 97 until the 2014 season, when he switched to number 13 (formerly worn by Derryl Cousins).

== Umpiring career ==
Tichenor has worked in both the American League and National League since 2007. Tichenor began the 2007 season as a minor league call-up umpire, working spring training and getting called up to the majors. Tichenor worked 58 major league games in that year.

In January 2012, Tichenor was hired full-time by MLB to fill the vacancy created by the retirement of Bill Hohn. He was promoted to crew chief in 2023.

=== Notable games ===
In 2008, Tichenor ejected San Diego manager Bud Black and bench coach Craig Colbert following an argument over the intent of a substitution. Black said that he intended to signal a double switch; Edgar Gonzalez would play second after pinch hitting for the pitcher, as Brian Giles had pinch hit for the second baseman. Tichenor interpreted the switches as straight substitutions. This left San Diego without a regular second baseman to finish the game, so outfielder Jerry Hairston Jr. had to be brought in to finish the game at second. Crew chief Gerry Davis later said that Black gave Tichenor the wrong signal to indicate the double switch.

In 2009, Tichenor was involved in a minor controversy when he ejected four people from the same game during a matchup between the Minnesota Twins and the Boston Red Sox. When Twins catcher Mike Redmond argued a close play at the plate, he was thrown out, as was Twins manager Ron Gardenhire. In the bottom half of the inning, Red Sox catcher Jason Varitek was tossed after arguing with Tichenor about balls and strikes. Red Sox manager Terry Francona was ejected shortly after Varitek for arguing the same case.

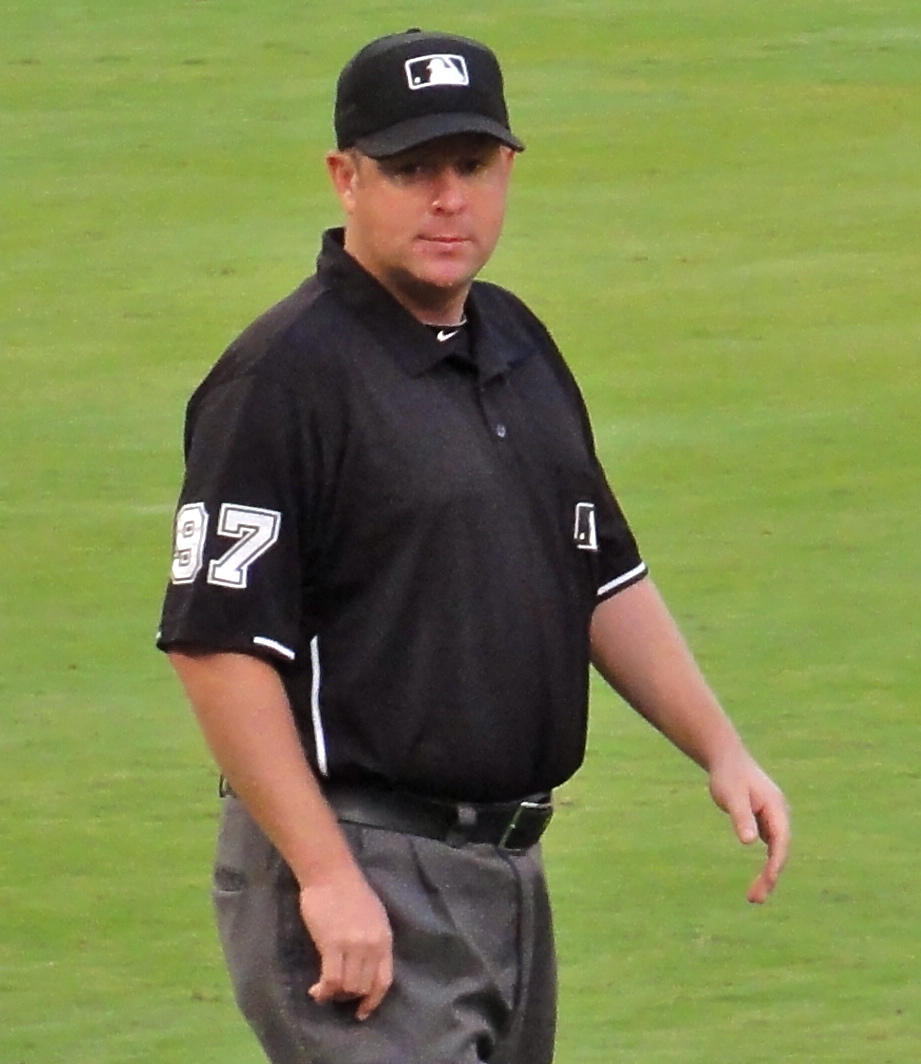
Tichenor at Sun Life Stadium, 2011.

Tichenor was the third base umpire when Oakland Athletics pitcher Dallas Braden threw the 19th perfect game in MLB history on May 9, 2010.

Tichenor was the left field umpire in the 2014 Major League Baseball All-Star Game and the right field umpire in the 2014 American League Wild Card Game. Tichenor was the home plate umpire and crew chief in the 2023 Major League Baseball All-Star Game.

Tichenor was the second base umpire for Miami Marlins pitcher Edinson Vólquez's no-hitter against the Arizona Diamondbacks on June 3, 2017.

Tichenor was the third base umpire for Chicago Cubs pitcher Alec Mills’ no-hitter against the Milwaukee Brewers on September 13, 2020.

== Personal life ==
Tichenor was raised in Lincoln, Nebraska, but after the death of his father, Tichenor and his family moved to moved to Garden City, Kansas in 1980, where he graduated from high school in 1995.

== See also ==
- List of Major League Baseball umpires (disambiguation)
