= Clint Vondrak =

American baseball umpire (born 1989)

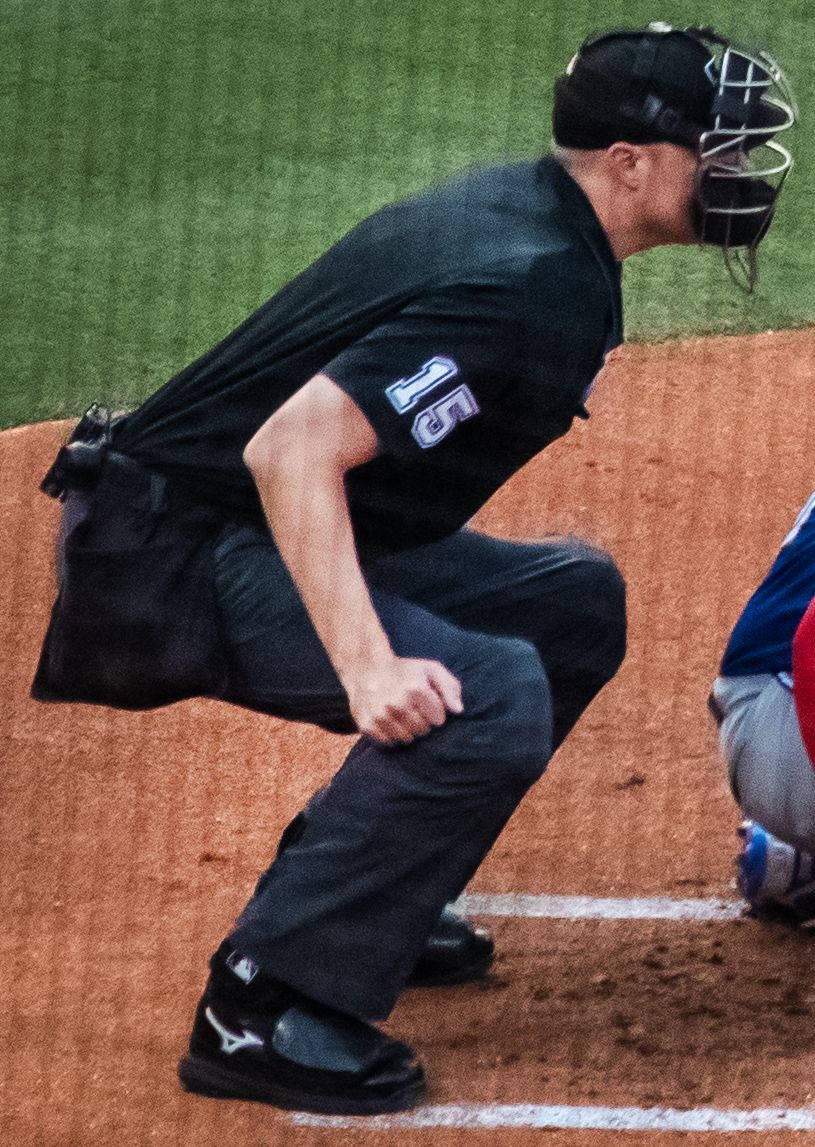
- Vondrak in 2025

MLB – No. 15
- Umpire
- Born: March 11, 1989 (age 37); Ventura, California, U.S.

MLB debut
- August 10, 2020

Crew information
- Umpiring crew: Q
- Crew members: #13 Todd Tichenor (crew chief); #11 Tony Randazzo; #78 Adam Hamari; #15 Clint Vondrak

Career highlights and awards
- Special assignments: Wild Card Games/Series (2026)

Clinton Edward Vondrak (born March 11, 1989) is an American professional baseball umpire. He has been an umpire in Major League Baseball since 2020, and was promoted to the full-time umpiring staff in 2024. Vondrak wears uniform number 15.

== Early life ==
Clinton Edward Vondrak was born March 11, 1989 in Ventura, California. He began officiating sports alongside his twin brother Derek at the age of 10, starting with basketball and then umpiring baseball. Derek currently referees high school and junior college basketball.

Clint graduated from Carson High School, in Carson City, Nevada, before attending the University of Nevada.

== Career ==
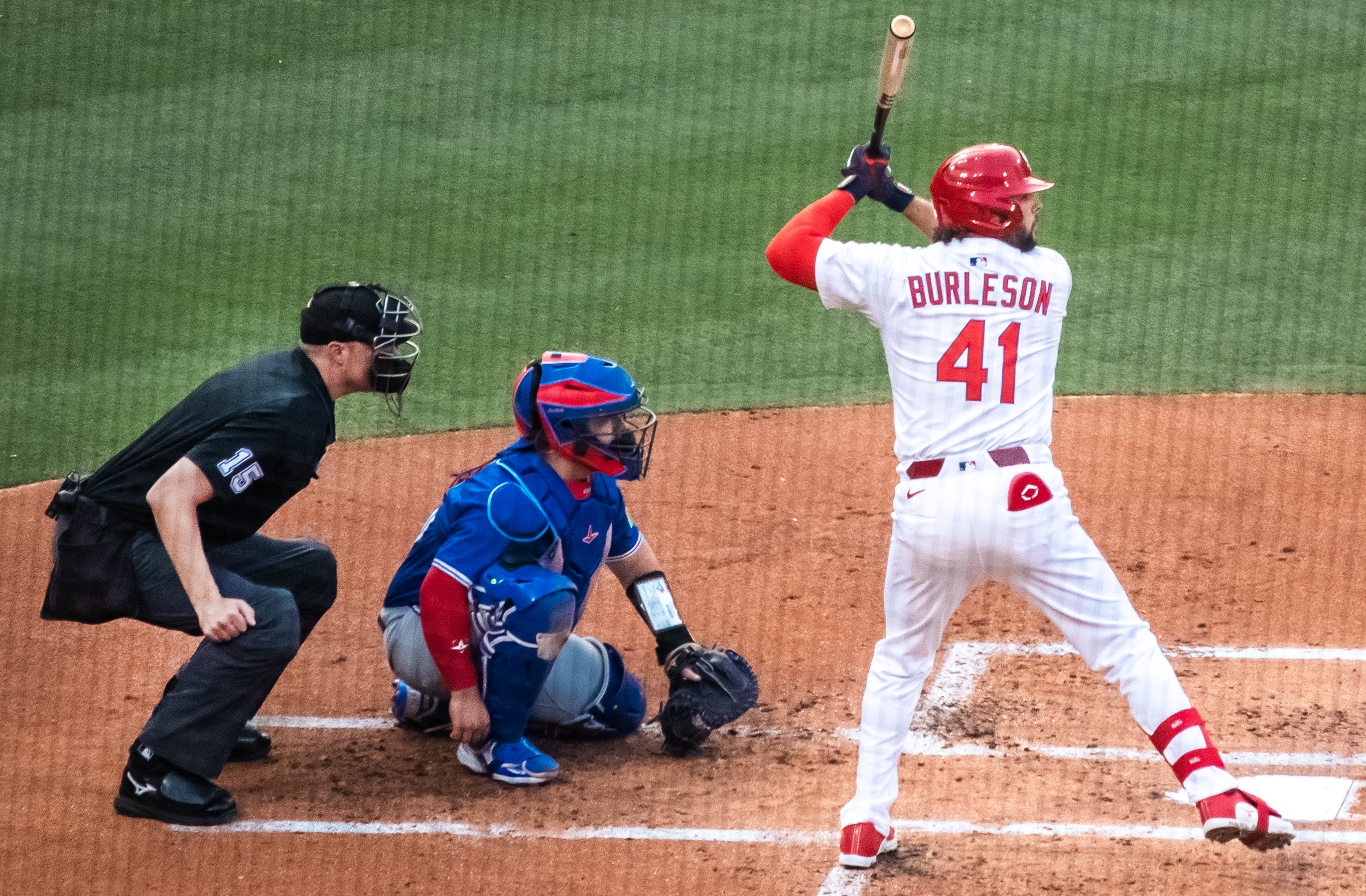
Vondrak behind the plate in St.Louis, 2025.

Vondrak made his minor league debut in 2012, working in the Pioneer League, Midwest League, California League, Southern League, and Pacific Coast League. He umpired the Southern League’s all-star game in 2016. His first major league game was between the San Francisco Giants and Houston Astros at Minute Maid Park on August 10, 2020. He worked the game with Ted Barrett, Adrian Johnson and Nick Mahrley.

Vondrak was promoted to full time staff alongside Ryan Wills in February 2024. They filled spots left by the retirements of Ed Hickox and Jeff Nelson.

== Personal life ==
Vondrak lives in St. Louis, Missouri.

== See also ==
- List of major league baseball umpires
