= Tripp Gibson =

American baseball umpire (born 1981)

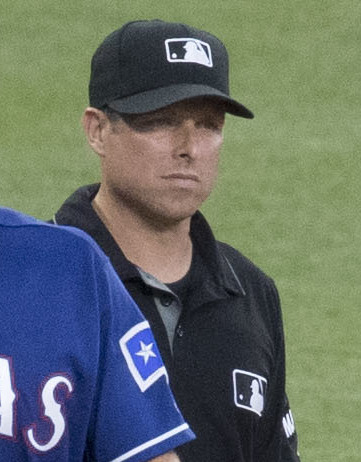
- Gibson in 2017

MLB – No. 73
- Umpire
- Born: August 5, 1981 (age 45); Mayfield, Kentucky, U.S.

MLB debut
- July 8, 2013

Crew information
- Umpiring crew: J
- Crew members: #51 Marvin Hudson (crew chief); #73 Tripp Gibson; #36 Ryan Blakney; #48 Nick Mahrley

Career highlights and awards
- Special Assignments: All-Star Games (2023); Wild Card Game/Series (2017, 2018, 2020, 2023, 2025); Division Series (2019, 2020, 2022, 2024, 2026); League Championship Series (2021, 2023); World Series (2022, 2026)

Hal Harrison “Tripp” Gibson III (born August 5, 1981), is an American Major League Baseball umpire who wears uniform number 73. Gibson's first Major League game was July 8, 2013, at Chase Field in Phoenix, Arizona. He was promoted to a full-time position in January 2015. Prior to his hiring, he worked as a substitute teacher during the offseason.

Gibson worked his first postseason in 2017, umpiring in the 2017 American League Wild Card Game.

He has participated in UMPS CARE charity events, such as bowling and golf tournaments, as well as visiting injured soldiers at Walter Reed Army Medical Center. In 2021 Tripp Gibson was rated the most accurate home plate umpire for balls and strikes

On November 2, 2022, Gibson was behind home plate for the Houston Astros combined no-hitter in a 5–0 win in Game 4 of the World Series vs the Philadelphia Phillies.

In 2025, Gibson was honored as a Murray State University 'Distinguished Alumni' and gave a talk to his alma mater department titled "From Art Major to Major League Umpire: How a CHFA Degree Prepares You for Any Career." He received an art degree, focused in printmaking in 2005, all while he was officiating baseball games. After graduation, he attended the Wendelstedt School for Umpires in Daytona Beach, Florida.
