= 2023 National League Championship Series =

Team (Wins)	Managers	Season
Arizona Diamondbacks (4)	Torey Lovullo	84–78 (.519), GB: 16
Philadelphia Phillies (3)	Rob Thomson	90–72 (.556), GB: 14
- Dates: October 16–24
- MVP: Ketel Marte (Arizona)
- Umpires: Lance Barksdale, Andy Fletcher, Tripp Gibson, Adam Hamari, Dan Iassogna (crew chief), Mike Muchlinski, Carlos Torres

Broadcast
- Television: TBS/Max
- TV announcers: Brian Anderson, Ron Darling, Jeff Francoeur, and Matt Winer
- Radio: ESPN
- Radio announcers: Jon Sciambi and Doug Glanville
- NLDS: Philadelphia Phillies over Atlanta Braves (3–1); Arizona Diamondbacks over Los Angeles Dodgers (3–0)

The 2023 National League Championship Series (NLCS) was the best-of-seven playoff in Major League Baseball's 2023 postseason between the defending National League champion and fourth-seeded Philadelphia Phillies and the sixth-seeded Arizona Diamondbacks for the National League (NL) pennant and the right to play in the 2023 World Series. The series began on October 16 and Game 7 was played on October 24. TBS/Max televised the games in the U.S.

This was the second time in LCS history, and second year in a row, that two wild card teams faced each other. For the third straight full season, a team with less than 90 wins won the NLCS, as the 84-win Diamondbacks pulled off the upset to defeat Philadelphia in seven games. The Phillies were just the fourth team with home-field advantage to win the first two games of an LCS in the seven game series era (1985–present), but not win the series.

The Diamondbacks would go on to lose in the 2023 World Series to the Texas Rangers in five games.

== Background ==
The Arizona Diamondbacks qualified for the postseason as the sixth seed wild card entrant with an 84–78 record. In the Wild Card Series, they swept the third-seeded and National League Central division winner Milwaukee Brewers, and then swept and upset the second-seeded and National League West division winner 100-win Los Angeles Dodgers in the Division Series to reach the National League Championship Series for the first time since 2007.

The Philadelphia Phillies qualified for the postseason as the fourth seed wild card entrant with a record of 90–72. In the Wild Card Series, they swept the Miami Marlins, and then defeated the National League East division winner Atlanta Braves, who held the best regular season record of 104–58 this season, in the Division Series in four games to return to the NLCS for the second consecutive season.

This series was the first postseason meeting between the Phillies and the Diamondbacks. This was also the second straight year that the two wild card seeds played in the NLCS. Since 2022, when the postseason got expanded, the only lower-seeded League Championship Series played was the 2022 NLCS (between the fifth and sixth seeds).

Philadelphia went 4–3 against Arizona in the regular season, though the two teams last met in June.

== Summary ==
Arizona won the series, 4–3.

Game	Date	Score	Location	Time	Attendance
1	October 16	Arizona Diamondbacks – 3, Philadelphia Phillies – 5	Citizens Bank Park	2:42	45,396
2	October 17	Arizona Diamondbacks – 0, Philadelphia Phillies – 10	Citizens Bank Park	3:06	45,412
3	October 19	Philadelphia Phillies – 1, Arizona Diamondbacks – 2	Chase Field	2:49	47,075
4	October 20	Philadelphia Phillies – 5, Arizona Diamondbacks – 6	Chase Field	3:27	47,806
5	October 21	Philadelphia Phillies – 6, Arizona Diamondbacks – 1	Chase Field	2:52	47,897
6	October 23	Arizona Diamondbacks – 5, Philadelphia Phillies – 1	Citizens Bank Park	3:02	45,473
7	October 24	Arizona Diamondbacks – 4, Philadelphia Phillies – 2	Citizens Bank Park	3:13	45,397

== Game summaries ==
This was the first postseason meeting between Arizona and Philadelphia.

=== Game 1 ===
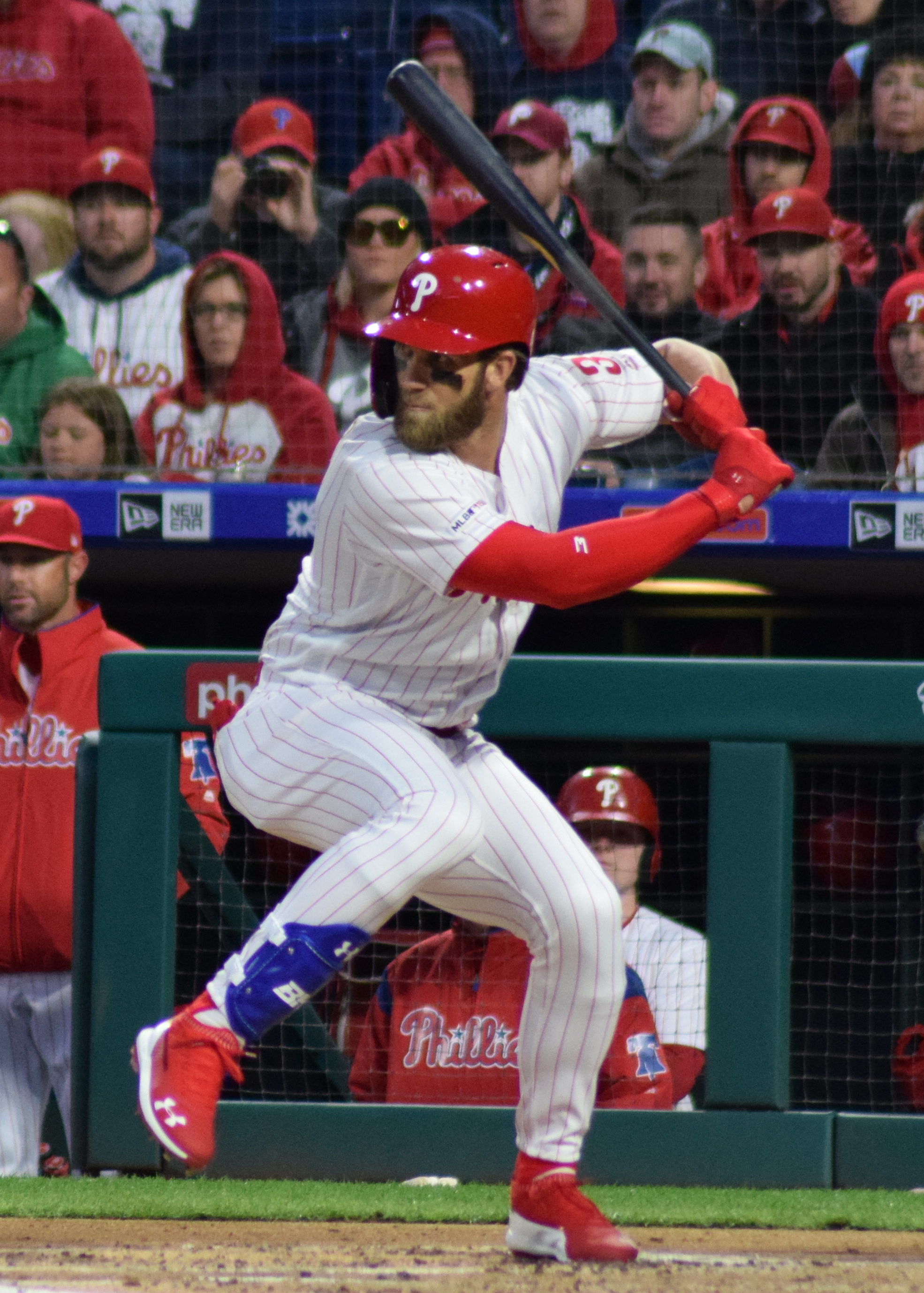
Bryce Harper had a home run and an RBI single in Game 1.

October 16, 2023 8:07 pm (EDT) at Citizens Bank Park in Philadelphia, Pennsylvania 56 °F (13 °C), Cloudy
Team	1	2	3	4	5	6	7	8	9	R	H	E
Arizona	0	0	0	0	0	2	1	0	0	3	4	1
Philadelphia	2	1	1	0	1	0	0	0	X	5	9	1
WP: Zack Wheeler (1–0) LP: Zac Gallen (0–1) Sv: Craig Kimbrel (1); Home runs: AZ: Geraldo Perdomo (1); PHI: Kyle Schwarber (1), Bryce Harper (1), Nick Castellanos (1); Attendance: 45,396; Boxscore

Arizona starter Zac Gallen was shaken up early by Philadelphia's offense, giving up two solo home runs to Kyle Schwarber and Bryce Harper in the bottom of the first (Schwarber's on Gallen's very first pitch of the night). Nick Castellanos added on in the second with another solo shot. In the third, Harper singled in Trea Turner to put the Phillies up 4–0. In the fifth, J. T. Realmuto singled in Harper to give the Phillies a five-run lead. The Diamondbacks scored on a two-run Geraldo Perdomo homer to make it 5–2 in the sixth. Alek Thomas then hit a sacrifice fly to score Christian Walker to make it 5–3 in the seventh. Craig Kimbrel closed out the win for the Phillies.

=== Game 2 ===
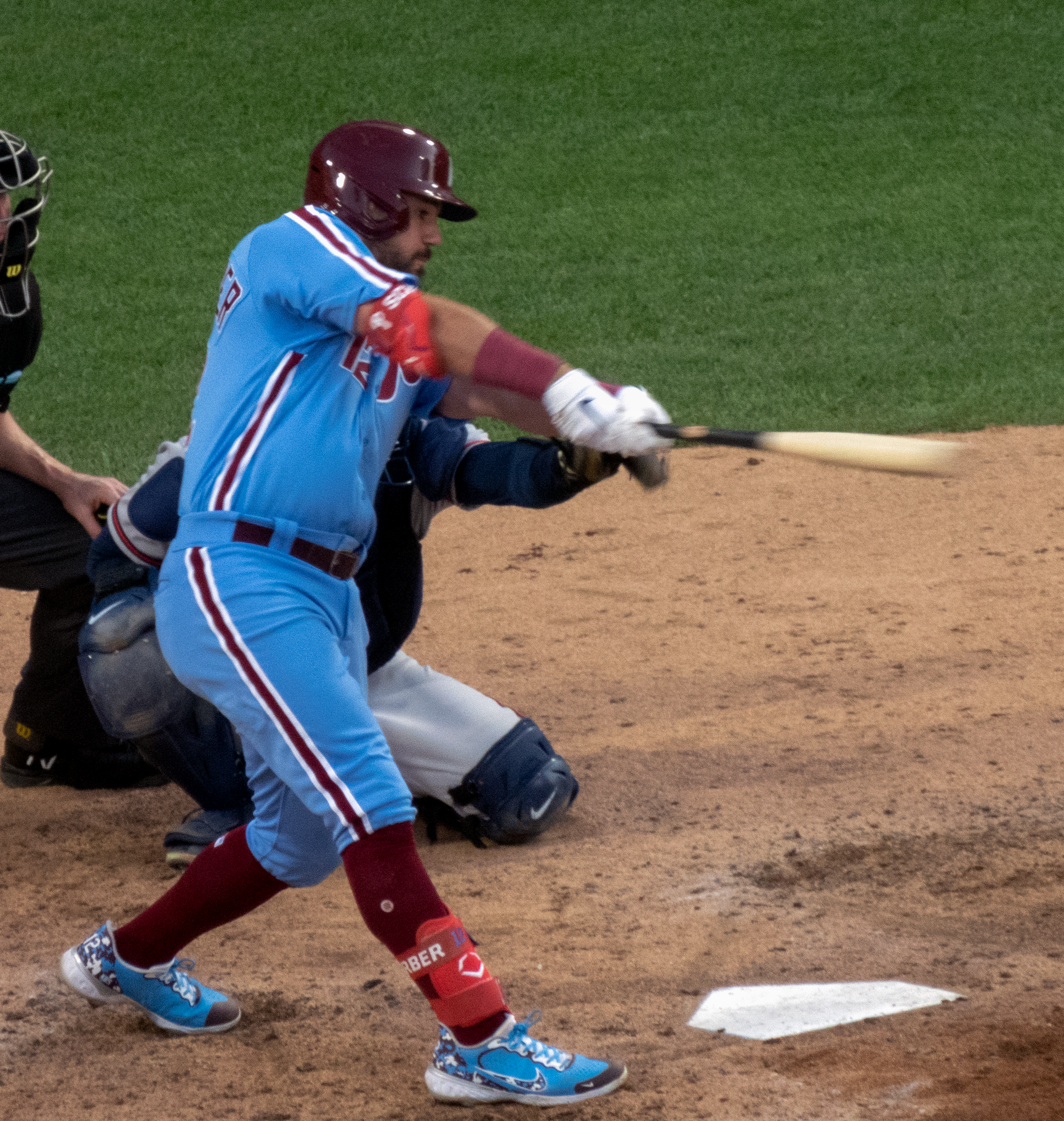
Kyle Schwarber hit two home runs in Game 2.

October 17, 2023 8:08 pm (EDT) at Citizens Bank Park in Philadelphia, Pennsylvania 57 °F (14 °C), Cloudy
Team	1	2	3	4	5	6	7	8	9	R	H	E
Arizona	0	0	0	0	0	0	0	0	0	0	4	0
Philadelphia	1	0	1	0	0	4	4	0	X	10	11	1
WP: Aaron Nola (1–0) LP: Merrill Kelly (0–1); Home runs: AZ: None; PHI: Trea Turner (1), Kyle Schwarber 2 (3); Attendance: 45,412; Boxscore

In contrast to the relatively close Game 1, Game 2 was a 10–0 blowout in favor of the Phillies. Aaron Nola started for Philadelphia and Merrill Kelly started for Arizona. Trea Turner and Kyle Schwarber hit solo home runs off Kelly in the first and third innings, respectively. Schwarber homered again in the sixth, taking Kelly out of the game. Kelly's replacement, Joe Mantiply, gave up a two-run double to J. T. Realmuto to give the Phillies a five-run lead. Brandon Marsh doubled, scoring Realmuto and making the score 6–0. The Phillies scored four more runs in the seventh inning off Ryne Nelson, with Alec Bohm, Realmuto, and Nick Castellanos all driving in runs. Nola struck out twelve batters, tossed six shutout innings, and only allowed three hits. With the win, the Phillies took a 2–0 series lead as the series shifted to Arizona.

=== Game 3 ===
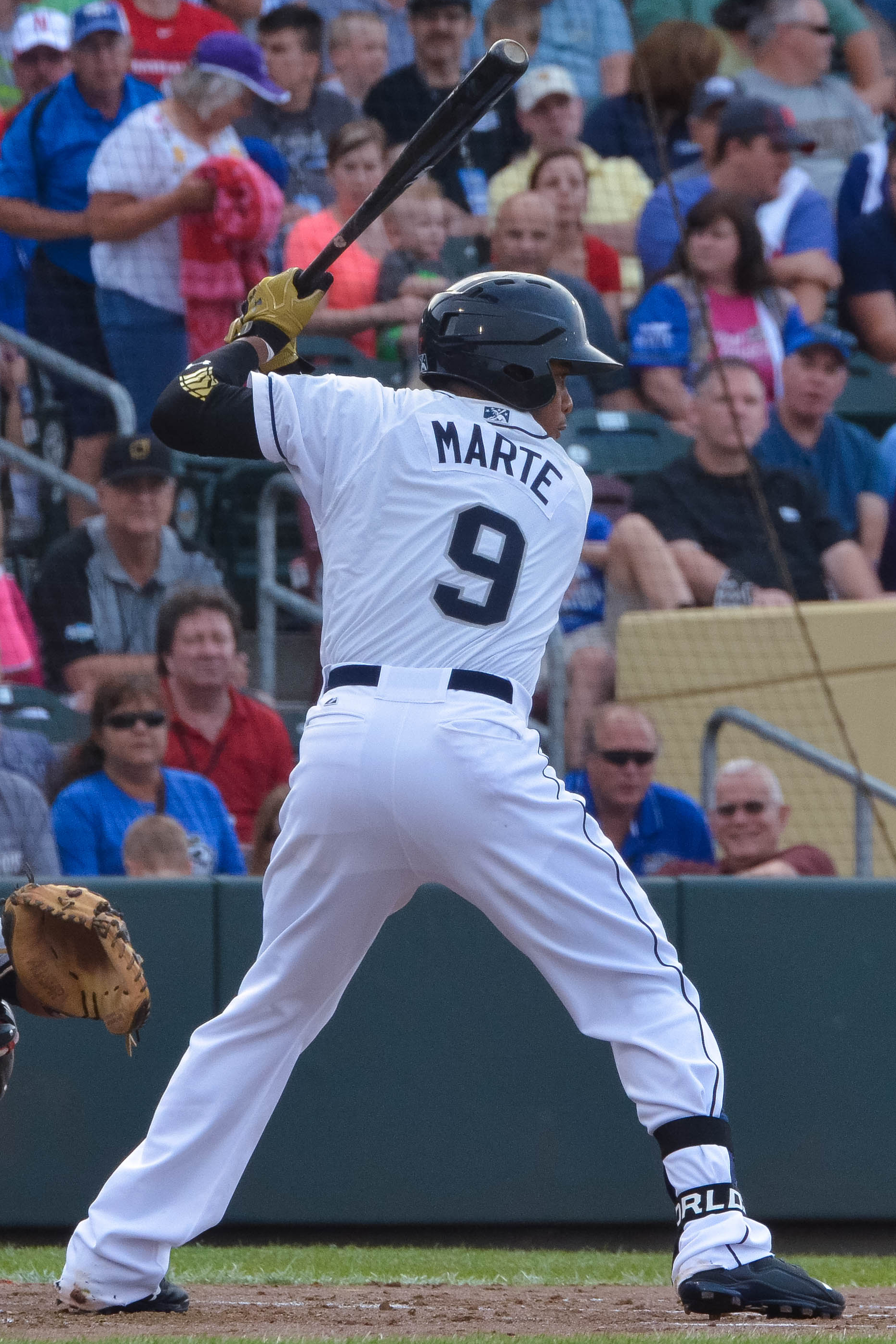
Ketel Marte hit a walk-off single in Game 3.

October 19, 2023 2:07 pm (MST) at Chase Field in Phoenix, Arizona 76 °F (24 °C), Roof Closed
Team	1	2	3	4	5	6	7	8	9	R	H	E
Philadelphia	0	0	0	0	0	0	1	0	0	1	3	0
Arizona	0	0	0	0	0	0	1	0	1	2	9	0
WP: Paul Sewald (1–0) LP: Craig Kimbrel (0–1); Attendance: 47,075; Boxscore

The first six innings of Game 3 consisted of a scoreless pitcher's duel between Arizona's Brandon Pfaadt and Philadelphia's Ranger Suárez. Pfaadt was pulled in the sixth after striking out Brandon Marsh, a decision that was heavily booed by fans at Chase Field. Suárez was also pulled in the sixth. The Phillies first scored in the seventh on a wild pitch by Ryan Thompson that scored Bryce Harper. Arizona tied the game in their half of the inning when Tommy Pham singled off Orion Kerkering. At that point, Alek Thomas pinch-ran for Pham, and with no outs, Lourdes Gurriel Jr. doubled in Thomas to tie the game at one. Kerkering gave up a single to the next batter, Pavin Smith, and was taken out of the game without recording any outs. His replacement, José Alvarado, got Emmanuel Rivera to ground out into a double play on the first pitch. Then, Alvarado got Geraldo Perdomo to ground out, ending the inning. Arizona reliever Kevin Ginkel kept the top of the eighth scoreless, and Alvarado did the same for the bottom of the inning. Arizona's Paul Sewald worked around a Harper walk and stolen base to send the game to the bottom of the ninth, where closer Craig Kimbrel was sent in for the Phillies. Kimbrel gave up a leadoff walk to Gurriel Jr., who then stole second base. Smith then singled to put runners at first and third with no outs. Emmanuel Rivera hit a grounder to shortstop Trea Turner, Gurriel Jr. ran home on contact and was tagged out at the plate by J. T. Realmuto, for the first out of the inning. Perdomo then drew a walk, loading the bases. Ketel Marte then singled to center field to give the Diamondbacks a walk-off victory. Game 3 broke a 22-year drought, as it was the first time Arizona won an NLCS game since Game 5 in 2001. It also marked the first walk-off postseason win in Diamondbacks history since Luis Gonzalez's walk-off single in Game 7 of the 2001 World Series.

=== Game 4 ===
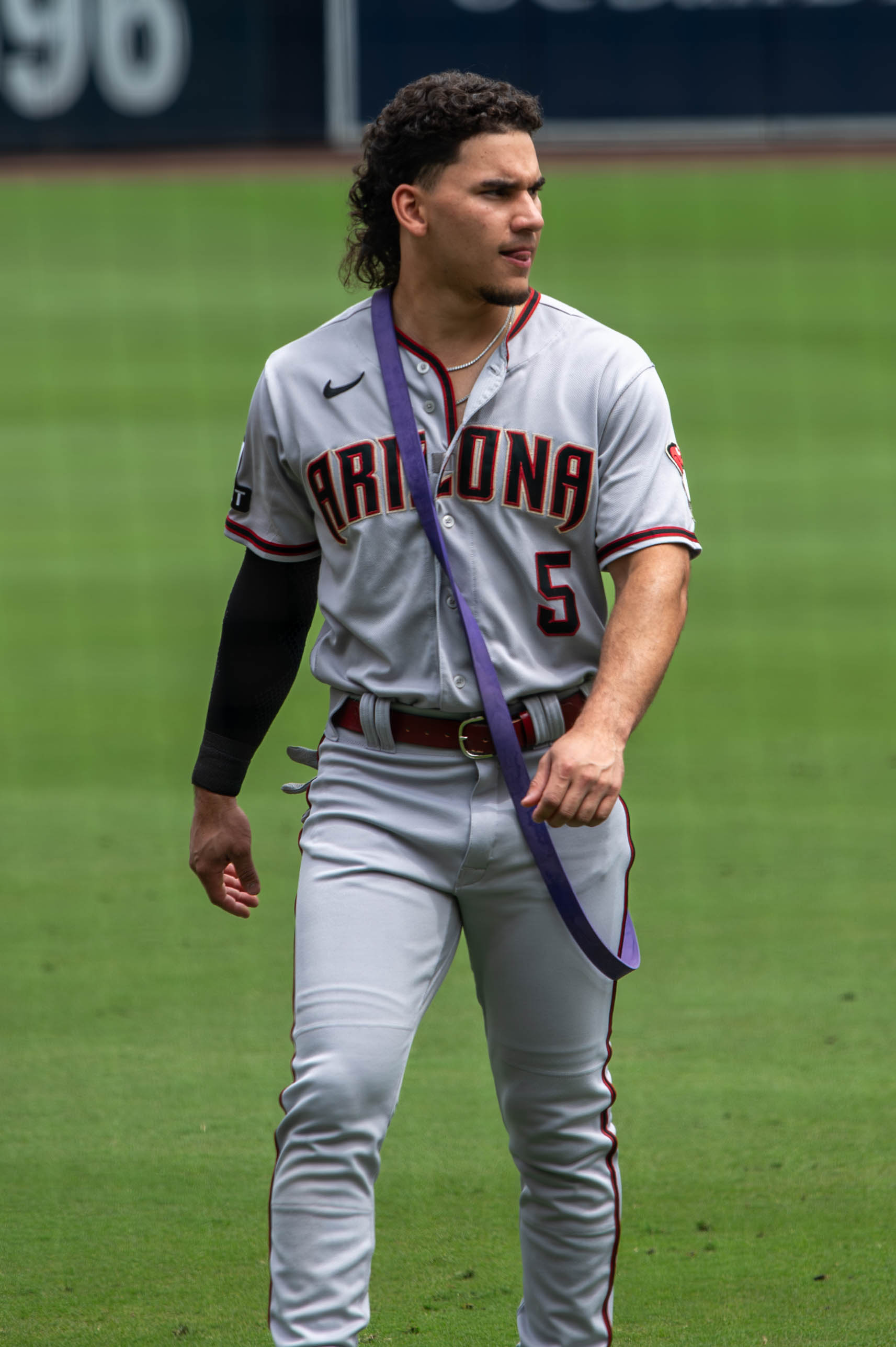
Alek Thomas hit the game-tying home run in Game 4.

October 20, 2023 5:08 pm (MST) at Chase Field in Phoenix, Arizona 76 °F (24 °C), Roof Closed
Team	1	2	3	4	5	6	7	8	9	R	H	E
Philadelphia	0	0	0	1	1	2	1	0	0	5	8	1
Arizona	0	1	1	0	0	0	1	3	X	6	9	1
WP: Kevin Ginkel (1–0) LP: Craig Kimbrel (0–2) Sv: Paul Sewald (1); Home runs: PHI: Kyle Schwarber (4); AZ: Alek Thomas (1); Attendance: 47,806; Boxscore

In the bottom of the second inning, Christian Walker scored on a single by Emmanuel Rivera to stake the Diamondbacks to an early 1–0 lead. In the third, Gabriel Moreno singled in Ketel Marte, the hero of Game 3, to make it 2–0 Arizona. Kyle Schwarber hit a solo homer in the top of the fourth to put the Phillies on the board. The next inning, Brandon Marsh doubled in J. T. Realmuto to tie the game at two. Alec Bohm hit a two-run single off Ryan Thompson in the sixth to give Philadelphia a 4–2 lead. A Trea Turner sac fly gave the Phillies their fifth run of the game. In the bottom of the seventh, Gregory Soto put Diamondbacks runners at first and third and was taken out of the game. His replacement, Orion Kerkering, walked Gabriel Moreno. With the bases loaded, Kerkering walked Christian Walker, forcing in a run and making it 5–3. Kerkering limited the damage by getting Pavin Smith to ground out. With Arizona trailing by two runs in the bottom of the eighth, Philadelphia closer Craig Kimbrel gave up a double to Lourdes Gurriel Jr. With one out, pinch-hitter Alek Thomas hit a two-run home run into the Chase Field pool to tie the game at five. After striking out Perdomo, Kimbrel gave up a single to Marte and hit Corbin Carroll with a pitch. Next up was Gabriel Moreno, who singled and scored Marte, giving the Diamondbacks a 6–5 lead. Paul Sewald successfully closed out the game for Arizona, tying the series at two games apiece.

=== Game 5 ===
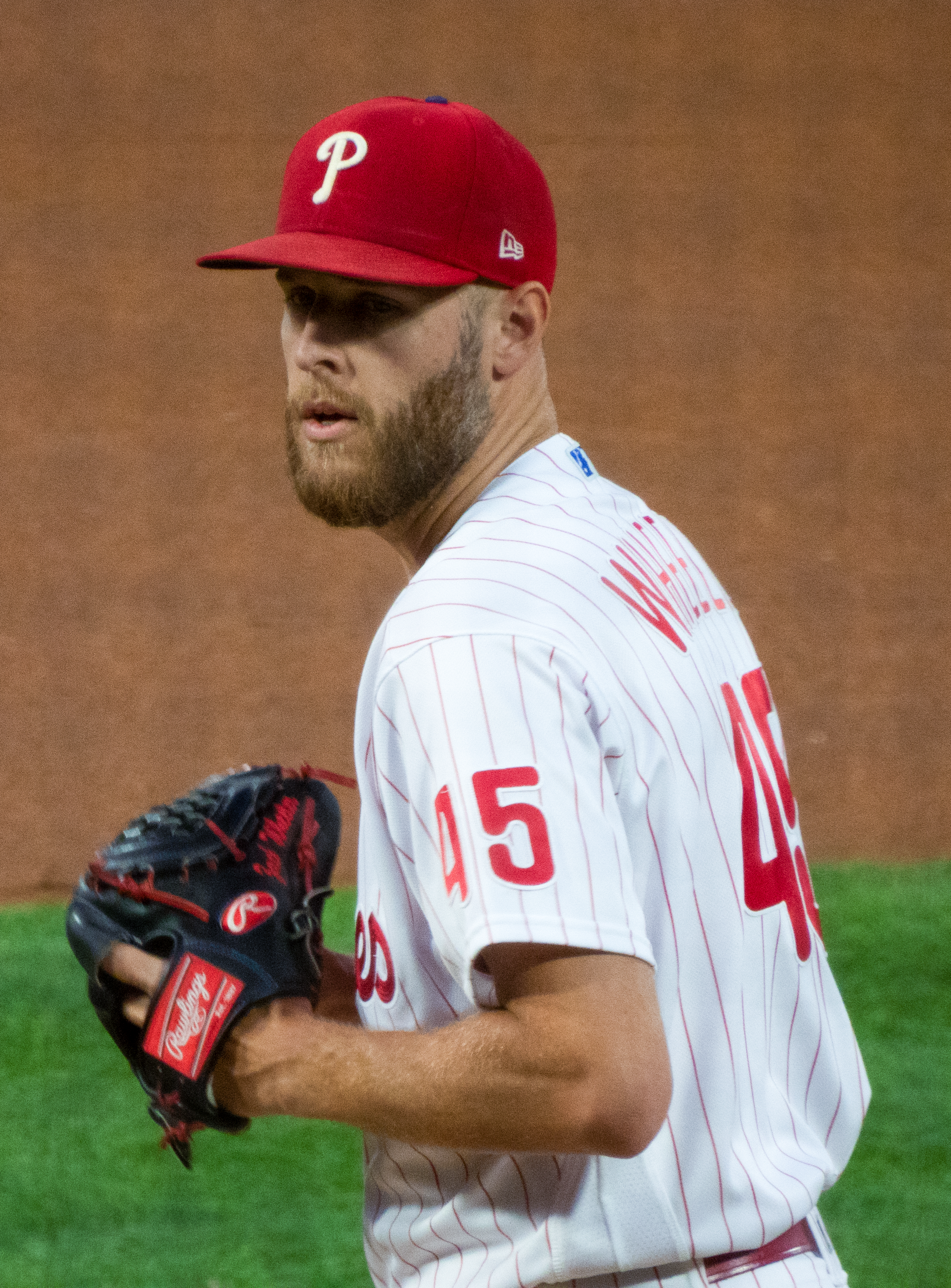
Zack Wheeler struck out eight batters and got the win for Philadelphia in Game 5.

October 21, 2023 5:10 pm (MST) at Chase Field in Phoenix, Arizona 76 °F (24 °C), Roof Closed
Team	1	2	3	4	5	6	7	8	9	R	H	E
Philadelphia	2	0	0	0	0	2	0	2	0	6	9	0
Arizona	0	0	0	0	0	0	1	0	0	1	8	2
WP: Zack Wheeler (2–0) LP: Zac Gallen (0–2); Home runs: PHI: Kyle Schwarber (5), Bryce Harper (2), J. T. Realmuto (1); AZ: Alek Thomas (2); Attendance: 47,897; Boxscore

Game 5 featured a pitching rematch of Game 1 between Zac Gallen for the Diamondbacks and Zack Wheeler for the Phillies. In the top of the first, Bryson Stott singled off Gallen to score Kyle Schwarber to give the Phillies the early lead. Later, Bryce Harper stole home as Stott stole second to give the Phillies a 2–0 lead. In the sixth, Schwarber homered off Gallen to extend the Phillies lead to 3–0; then Harper homered to further extend the Phillies lead to 4–0. In the bottom of the seventh, Alek Thomas hit a home run off Zack Wheeler to put the Diamondbacks on the board cutting their deficit to three. In the top of the eighth, J. T. Realmuto hit a two-run home run off Luis Frías to extend the Phillies lead to 6–1. With the win, the Phillies took a 3–2 edge in the series and returned to Philadelphia needing one more victory to secure their second consecutive World Series appearance and send the Diamondbacks into the off-season.

=== Game 6 ===
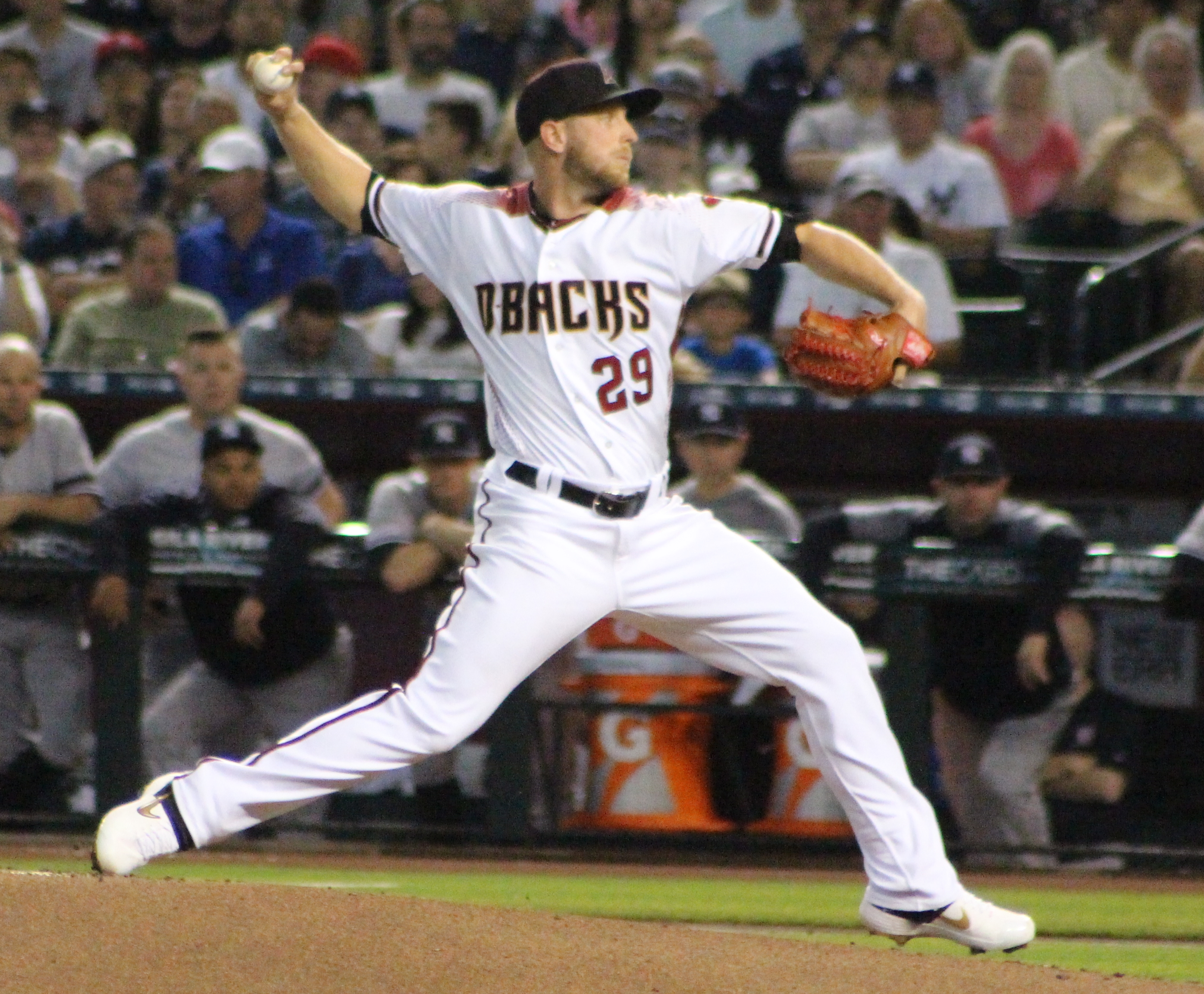
Merrill Kelly was the winning pitcher in Game 6.

October 23, 2023 5:07 pm (EDT) at Citizens Bank Park in Philadelphia, Pennsylvania 63 °F (17 °C), Clear
Team	1	2	3	4	5	6	7	8	9	R	H	E
Arizona	0	3	0	0	1	0	1	0	0	5	10	0
Philadelphia	0	1	0	0	0	0	0	0	0	1	6	1
WP: Merrill Kelly (1–1) LP: Aaron Nola (1–1); Home runs: AZ: Tommy Pham (1), Lourdes Gurriel Jr. (1); PHI: None; Attendance: 45,473; Boxscore

Game 6 featured a rematch of Game 2 between Aaron Nola for the Phillies and Merrill Kelly for the Diamondbacks. Tommy Pham and Lourdes Gurriel Jr. led off the second inning with back-to-back home runs to take a 2−0 lead. Alek Thomas walked and scored when Evan Longoria doubled to left center field, giving the Diamondbacks a 3−0 lead. In the home half, Brandon Marsh singled to score J. T. Realmuto to narrow the lead 3−1. Corbin Carroll singled in the fifth inning and would later score on a Ketel Marte triple to extend the Diamondback lead to 4−1. Marte tied a Major League record to start a postseason career with Marquis Grissom with 15 straight games with a hit. Geraldo Perdomo singled off Orion Kerkering to start the seventh inning, followed by a stolen base and would score on a Marte single taking the lead to 5−1. Ryan Thompson, Andrew Saalfrank, and Kevin Ginkel pitched scoreless sixth, seventh, and eighth innings to preserve the Diamondbacks lead. Paul Sewald pitched a scoreless ninth inning in a non-save situation to end the game and force a deciding Game 7.

=== Game 7 ===
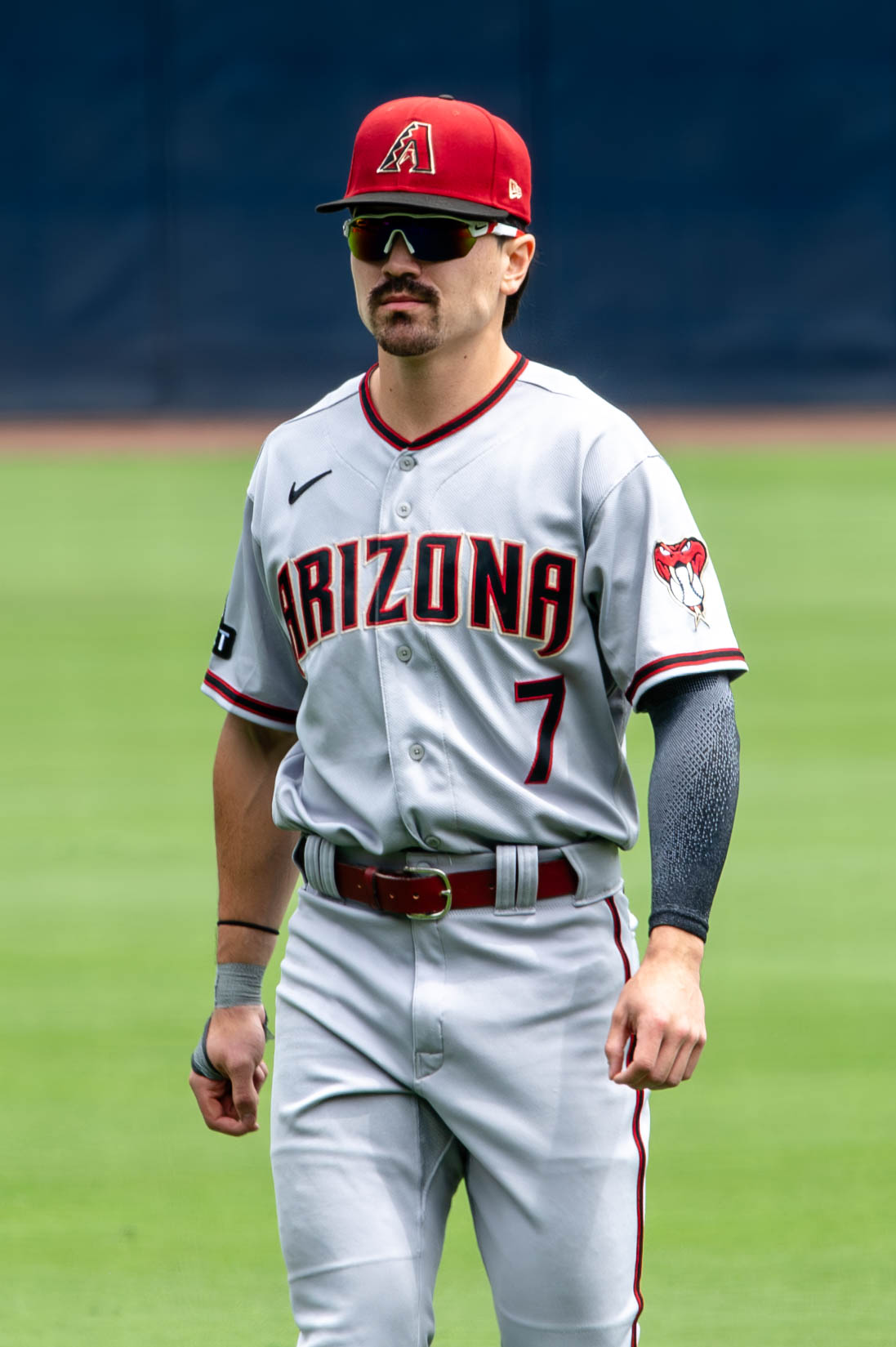
Corbin Carroll had two RBIs in Game 7.

October 24, 2023 8:08 pm (EDT) at Citizens Bank Park in Philadelphia, Pennsylvania 59 °F (15 °C), Clear
Team	1	2	3	4	5	6	7	8	9	R	H	E
Arizona	1	0	0	0	2	0	1	0	0	4	11	0
Philadelphia	0	1	0	1	0	0	0	0	0	2	5	0
WP: Ryan Thompson (1-0) LP: Ranger Suárez (0–1) Sv: Paul Sewald (2); Home runs: AZ: None; PHI: Alec Bohm (1); Attendance: 45,397; Boxscore

This was the second League Championship Series to reach a winner-take-all Game 7 during the 2023 postseason. This was the first Game 7 for the Phillies in franchise history and the Diamondbacks' first Game 7 since the 2001 World Series, their second overall when they won their only World Series title in franchise history. This was the fourth time in Major League history both League Championship Series reached a Game 7 in the same postseason with it previously happening in 2003, 2004, and 2020.

Game 7 featured a pitching rematch of Game 3 between Brandon Pfaadt of the Diamondbacks and Ranger Suárez of the Phillies. The Diamondbacks scored first when Corbin Carroll scored on a force out. In the bottom of the second, Alec Bohm hit a solo home run to tie the game at one apiece. In the bottom of the fourth, Bryson Stott doubled home Bohm to give the Phillies a one-run lead. In the top of the fifth, Corbin Carroll’s RBI single scored Emmanuel Rivera tying the game at two apiece. Later in the same inning, Gabriel Moreno's RBI single scored Carroll to give the Diamondbacks a 3−2 lead. In the top of the seventh, Carroll's sacrifice fly scored Geraldo Perdomo to make it 4−2. The Phillies threatened with two runners on and one out in the bottom of that inning, but Kevin Ginkel retired Trea Turner and Bryce Harper on flyouts to end the inning. Ginkel then pitched a perfect eighth inning, and Paul Sewald finished with a perfect ninth inning to send the Diamondbacks to their first World Series since winning it all in 2001.

=== Composite line score ===
2023 NLCS (4–3): Arizona Diamondbacks beat Philadelphia Phillies

Team	1	2	3	4	5	6	7	8	9	R	H	E
Arizona Diamondbacks	1	4	1	0	3	2	6	3	1	21	55	4
Philadelphia Phillies	5	3	2	2	2	8	6	2	0	30	51	4
Total attendance: 324,456 Average attendance: 46,350

== Series overview and aftermath ==
"I'll say this right now... write it down... if they [Diamondbacks] win the next two days, they win the next two games and win this series in seven games, if they win, I will retire on the spot."

— Chris "Maddog" Russo, before Game 6

ESPN and Sirius XM sports radio personality Chris "Maddog" Russo claimed that if the 84-win D-backs came back from a 3–2 series deficit on the road against the Phillies, he would retire. Word got back to Arizona's manager Torey Lovullo and the team used it as extra motivated. During their clubhouse celebration after the Game 7 win, the team chanted "Mad Dog," while smoking cigars and popping champagne. Russo did not end up retiring, despite his on-air promise. Instead, he and Howard Stern negotiated an alternate punishment: Russo would wear a Diamondbacks bikini with a sign that says "I'm a liar and a dope" and make a donation to the team's foundation.

=== Phillies ===
The Phillies soundly defeated the Arizona Diamondbacks in the first two games of this National League Championship Series, only to drop four of the next five. They had late leads in Games 3 and 4. They led Game 7, a 4–2 loss, by a run in the fifth inning. In the end, from players to media, many felt like the Phillies gave the series away. The Phillies were the first NL team with home-field to win the first two games of an NLCS and drop the series since the Dodgers did so against the Cardinals in 1985. Additionally, they were the just the fifth team to fail to win the pennant after winning the first two games of a seven-game series (1985-present), joining the 2020 Braves (series was played at a neutral site due to the COVID-19 pandemic), 2004 Yankees (who won their first three games), 1985 Dodgers, and 1985 Blue Jays. This feat would later be accomplished by the 2025 Mariners.

Immediately following their Game 7 loss, Tyler Kepner, The Athletic national baseball writer and a Phillies fan growing up, named it the Phillies' fifth most devastating loss in their 134-year history, while some Phillies fans called it the franchise's worst. For the most part, pinned as the reason for the Phillies' upset defeat was the bullpen and a vanishing offense, which was a common theme for this era of Phillies teams. It was a major concern for the 2022 pennant-winning Phillies that saw them lose three straight World Series games after being up 2–1 (which included being no-hit in Game 4) and it was a problem in subsequent seasons. In 2024, the Phillies would suffer another upset series loss to their rival, the New York Mets, in the National League Division Series. In the series against the Mets, the bullpen blew two late-game leads, and the offense batted just .186 for the entire series. The Phillies would later lose to the Los Angeles Dodgers in 2025 and Atlanta Braves in 2026, not winning a series in each of these seasons.

=== Diamondbacks ===
With the series win, the Diamondbacks extended the Milwaukee Brewers reverse World Series curse, which was baseball-related superstition that saw every team the Milwaukee Brewers lost to in the postseason would at least make it to the World Series. The Diamondbacks had previously defeated the Brewers in the Wild Card round in two games. The curse was seemingly broken when the New York Mets, who beat the Brewers in the 2024 Wild Card round, were themselves defeated by the Los Angeles Dodgers in the 2024 National League Championship Series, thus not qualifying for the World Series.

The 2023 Diamondbacks’ 84 wins were the fewest of any pennant winner since the 2006 St. Louis Cardinals, who won the pennant and eventually the World Series with only 83 wins, and they became the fourth team to win a league pennant with 85 or fewer wins (1973 Mets, 1987 Twins, 2006 Cardinals).

Arizona would end up losing the World Series to the Texas Rangers in five games. NLCS MVP Ketel Marte would extend his postseason hit streak to 20 games in the World Series before having it end in Game 5. It was the longest hit streak in postseason history by 3 games; the previous high of 17 was accomplished by Hank Bauer (1956–58), Derek Jeter (2003–04) and Manny Ramirez (2003–04).

== See also ==
- 2023 American League Championship Series
