= Adam Hamari =

American baseball umpire (born 1983)

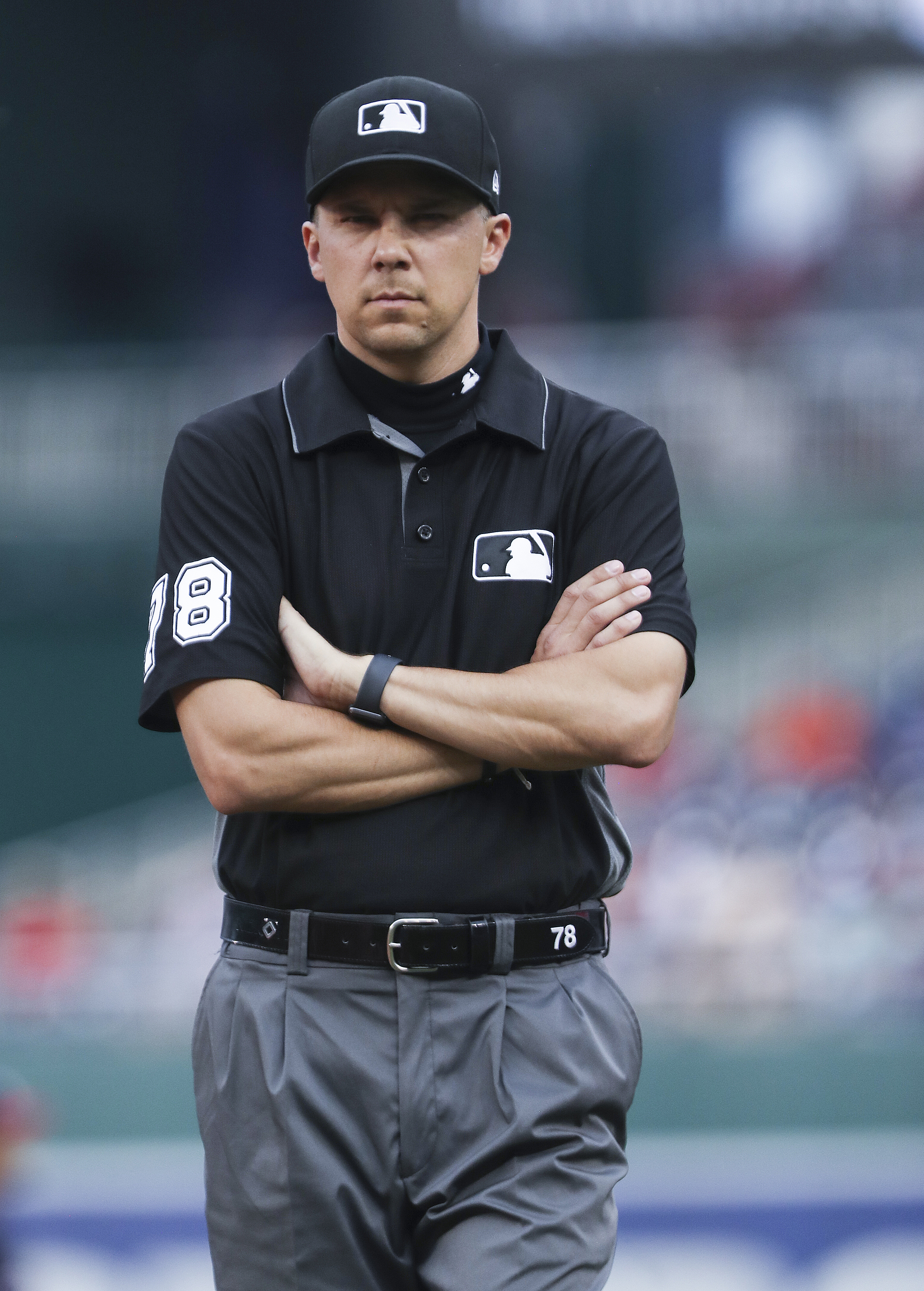
- Hamari in 2021

MLB – No. 78
- Umpire
- Born: May 25, 1983 (age 43); Marquette, Michigan, U.S.

MLB debut
- June 25, 2013

Crew information
- Umpiring crew: Q
- Crew members: #13 Todd Tichenor (crew chief); #11 Tony Randazzo; #78 Adam Hamari; #15 Clint Vondrak

Career highlights and awards
- Special Assignments: World Series (2025); League Championship Series (2022, 2023, 2026); Division Series (2021, 2024, 2025); Wild Card Games/Series (2019, 2020, 2022, 2023); All-Star Games (2021); World Baseball Classic (2023); London Series (2023)

Adam Curtis Hamari (/ˈhɑ̝mɑ̝ri/; born May 25, 1983) is an American Major League Baseball (MLB) umpire.

Hamari began umpiring baseball for Little League teams at the age of 12. Adam is a 2006 Graduate of the Jim Evans Academy of Professional Umpiring (JEAPU) He began umpiring Minor League Baseball games in 2006, and was promoted to the major leagues on a part-time basis in 2013. Hamari was one of four umpires named to the full-time staff in February 2017, upon the retirements of Jim Joyce, John Hirschbeck, Tim Welke, and Bob Davidson.

Hamari was the plate umpire when Tim Lincecum of the San Francisco Giants threw his second career no-hitter on June 25, 2014. He was also behind the plate when Derek Jeter of the New York Yankees hit a walk-off single in his final career home game on September 25, 2014.

Hamari was the third base umpire for Miami Marlins pitcher Edinson Vólquez's no-hitter against the Arizona Diamondbacks on June 3, 2017.

On May 28, 2016, Hamari ejected Noah Syndergaard of the New York Mets for throwing a fastball behind Dodgers second baseman Chase Utley. This pitch was viewed as retaliation for Utley's hard slide in the 2015 National League Division Series, which broke the leg of Mets infielder Ruben Tejada. Mets manager Terry Collins was also ejected after arguing in Syndergaard's defense. Crew chief Tom Hallion was wired for sound and many of the arguments were leaked to the media months afterward.
