= Nick Mahrley =

American baseball umpire (born 1982)

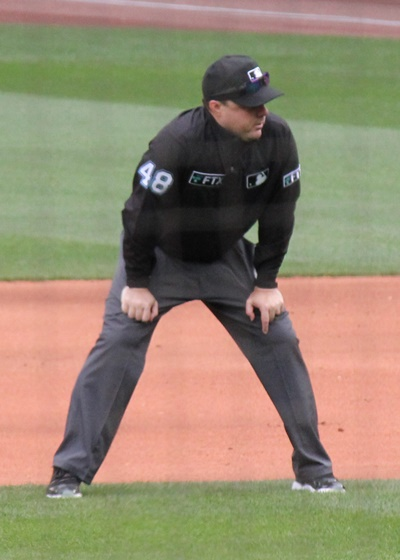
- Mahrley during a game at T-Mobile Park in 2022

MLB – No. 48
- Umpire
- Born: September 23, 1982 (age 44); Park Ridge, Illinois, U.S.

MLB debut
- August 3, 2017

Crew information
- Umpiring crew: J
- Crew members: #51 Marvin Hudson (crew chief); #73 Tripp Gibson; #36 Ryan Blakney; #48 Nick Mahrley

Career highlights and awards
- Special assignments: Division Series (2024, 2026); Wild Card Series (2025); MLB Little League Classic (2023)

Nicholas Stephen Mahrley (born September 23, 1982) is an American professional baseball umpire who began his Major League Baseball career in 2017 and joined the permanent staff in 2023. He wears uniform number 48.

== Umpiring career ==
Mahrley began working as a Minor League Baseball umpire in 2007. He umpired in the Gulf Coast League, New York-Penn League, Midwest League, Carolina League, Florida State League, Eastern League, and the Pacific Coast League.

Mahrley made his major league debut on August 3, 2017 for a game between the New York Mets and the Colorado Rockies at Coors Field. He was at third base, with Lance Barrett at second, Brian Knight at first, and Jim Reynolds as home plate umpire. MLB promoted Mahrley to the permanent staff in 2023 after a record-high ten umpires retired following the 2022 season. His first MLB postseason assignment was the 2024 American League Division Series between the Cleveland Guardians and the Detroit Tigers.

Oh August 25, 2024, Mahrley had to be carted off the field at Yankee Stadium after being hit on the side of his neck by the barrel of a broken baseball bat from Giancarlo Stanton while he was behind home plate. He was diagnosed with a concussion.

== Personal life ==
Mahrley and his wife Jodi reside in Phoenix, Arizona. Prior to becoming an umpire, Mahrley served in the United States Air Force.

== See also ==
- List of Major League Baseball umpires (disambiguation)
