= 2012 Major League Baseball All-Star Game =

2012 American baseball competition

	1	2	3	4	5	6	7	8	9	R	H	E
National League	5	0	0	3	0	0	0	0	0	8	10	0
American League	0	0	0	0	0	0	0	0	0	0	6	0
- Date: July 10, 2012
- Venue: Kauffman Stadium
- City: Kansas City, Missouri
- Managers: Tony La Russa (STL/Retired); Ron Washington (TEX)
- MVP: Melky Cabrera (SF)
- Attendance: 40,933
- Ceremonial first pitch: George Brett
- Television: Fox (United States); MLB International (International)
- TV announcers: Joe Buck, Tim McCarver, Ken Rosenthal and Erin Andrews (Fox); Gary Thorne and Rick Sutcliffe (MLB International)
- Radio: ESPN
- Radio announcers: Jon Sciambi and Chris Singleton

The 2012 Major League Baseball All-Star Game was the 83rd edition of the Major League Baseball All-Star Game. It was held on July 10, 2012, during the 2012 Major League Baseball season at Kauffman Stadium in Kansas City, Missouri, home of the Kansas City Royals. This marked the third time the Mid-summer Classic had been played in Kansas City, with Kauffman Stadium (then named Royals Stadium) last hosting the event in 1973, the stadium's first year of existence. The event was also held at Municipal Stadium in 1960, when the Athletics were still based there, one of two played that season. The game was televised in the United States by Fox.

The National League shut out the American League for the sixth time in All-Star Game history. It was the third-largest margin of victory for any Mid-summer Classic. The TV ratings fell even further than the 2011 edition, earning a 6.8 rating and 12 share on Fox. The total number of viewers who watched any portion of the game was up 7 percent from the previous year, however, with 27.7 million total viewers.

The National League would not win the All-Star Game again until 2023.

== Host selection ==
Kauffman Stadium underwent a US $250 million renovation, funded by a 0.375% sales tax increase on the residents of Jackson County, Missouri for the Harry S. Truman Sports Complex, which also houses Arrowhead Stadium, the home of the Kansas City Chiefs. The referendum passed in an election on April 4, 2006. As a result of the deal, Major League Baseball commissioner Bud Selig promised the area that the team would host a future All-Star Game no later than 2014. On June 16, 2010, Selig officially awarded the rights to host the game to Kansas City for the 2012 season.

Fenway Park was also in contention for hosting the 2012 All-Star Game to celebrate that park's centennial. However Boston had most recently hosted the 1999 All-Star game.

== Fan balloting ==
=== Starters ===
Balloting for the 2012 All-Star Game starters began online April 20 and continued through June 28. Fan voting also took place in each MLB stadium, beginning May 8 (at the latest) and ended on June 22. The top vote-getters at each position (including the designated hitter for the American League) and the top three among outfielders, were named the starters for their respective leagues. The results were announced on July 1. A record 40.2 million votes were cast, beating out the previous record from 2011 (32.5 million) by a little under eight million. Josh Hamilton was the leading vote-getter with 11,073,744 votes, shattering the record that José Bautista set the prior year with 7,454,753 votes. Buster Posey set a new NL record for votes this year with 7,621,370 votes.

=== Final roster spot ===
After the rosters were revealed, a second ballot of five players per league was created for the All-Star Final Vote to determine the 34th and final player of each roster. The online balloting was conducted from Sunday afternoon, July 1, through Thursday afternoon, July 5. The winners of the All-Star Final Vote were Yu Darvish of the Texas Rangers (AL) and David Freese of the St. Louis Cardinals (NL). Chipper Jones, of the Atlanta Braves, was removed from the ballot on July 3 after he replaced Matt Kemp on the roster due to injury.

Player	Team	Pos.	Player	Team	Pos.
American League			National League		
Jonathan Broxton	KC	P	Michael Bourn	ATL	OF
Yu Darvish	TEX	P	David Freese	STL	3B
Ernesto Frieri	LAA	P	Bryce Harper	WAS	OF
Jason Hammel	BAL	P	Aaron Hill	ARI	2B
Jake Peavy	CWS	P			

== Rosters ==
Players in italics have since been inducted into the National Baseball Hall of Fame.

=== American League ===
Elected starters
Position	Player	Team	All-Star Games
C	Mike Napoli	Rangers	1
1B	Prince Fielder	Tigers	4
2B	Robinson Canó	Yankees	4
3B	Adrián Beltré	Rangers	3
SS	Derek Jeter	Yankees	13
OF	José Bautista	Blue Jays	3
OF	Curtis Granderson	Yankees	3
OF	Josh Hamilton	Rangers	5
DH	David Ortiz	Red Sox	8

Reserves
Position	Player	Team	All-Star Games
C	Joe Mauer	Twins	5
C	Matt Wieters	Orioles	2
1B	Paul Konerko	White Sox	6
2B	Ian Kinsler	Rangers	3
3B	Miguel Cabrera	Tigers	7
SS	Asdrúbal Cabrera	Indians	2
SS	Elvis Andrus	Rangers	2
OF	Adam Jones	Orioles	2
OF	Mike Trout	Angels	1
OF	Mark Trumbo	Angels	1
DH	Billy Butler	Royals	1
DH	Adam Dunn	White Sox	2

Pitchers
Player	Team	All-Star Games
Ryan Cook	Athletics	1
Yu Darvish (Note: Denotes Final Vote Winner.)	Rangers	1
Matt Harrison	Rangers	1
Félix Hernández	Mariners	3
Jim Johnson	Orioles	1
Joe Nathan	Rangers	5
Jake Peavy (Note: Jake Peavy replaced C. J. Wilson on the roster due to injury.)	White Sox	3
Chris Perez	Indians	2
David Price	Rays	3
Fernando Rodney^{†}	Rays	1
CC Sabathia^{#}	Yankees	6
Chris Sale	White Sox	1
Justin Verlander	Tigers	5
Jered Weaver	Angels	3
C. J. Wilson (Note: C. J. Wilson replaced CC Sabathia on the roster due to injury.)^{#}	Angels	2

=== National League ===
Elected starters
Position	Player	Team	All-Star Games
C	Buster Posey	Giants	1
1B	Joey Votto	Reds	3
2B	Dan Uggla	Braves	3
3B	Pablo Sandoval	Giants	2
SS	Rafael Furcal	Cardinals	3
OF	Melky Cabrera	Giants	1
OF	Carlos Beltrán	Cardinals	7
OF	Matt Kemp^{#}	Dodgers	2
DH	Carlos González	Rockies	1

Reserves
Position	Player	Team	All-Star Games
C	Yadier Molina^{#}	Cardinals	4
C	Carlos Ruiz	Phillies	1
1B	Bryan LaHair	Cubs	1
2B	Jose Altuve	Astros	1
3B	David Freese^{[E]}	Cardinals	1
3B	David Wright	Mets	6
DH	Chipper Jones (Note: Chipper Jones replaced Matt Kemp on the roster due to injury.)	Braves	8
SS	Starlin Castro	Cubs	2
SS	Ian Desmond^{#}	Nationals	1
DH	Michael Bourn (Note: Michael Bourn replaced Ian Desmond on the roster due to injury.)	Braves	2
OF	Ryan Braun	Brewers	5
OF	Jay Bruce	Reds	2
OF	Bryce Harper (Note: Bryce Harper replaced Giancarlo Stanton on the roster due to injury.)	Nationals	1
DH	Matt Holliday (Note: Matt Holliday replaced Yadier Molina on the roster due to Molina being placed on the bereavement list.)	Cardinals	6
OF	Andrew McCutchen	Pirates	2
OF	Giancarlo Stanton^{#}	Marlins	1

Pitchers
Player	Team	All-Star Games
Matt Cain	Giants	3
Aroldis Chapman	Reds	1
R. A. Dickey	Mets	1
Gio González	Nationals	2
Cole Hamels	Phillies	3
Joel Hanrahan	Pirates	2
Clayton Kershaw	Dodgers	2
Craig Kimbrel	Braves	2
Lance Lynn	Cardinals	1
Wade Miley	Diamondbacks	1
Jonathan Papelbon	Phillies	5
Stephen Strasburg	Nationals	1
Huston Street	Padres	1

- #: Indicates player would not play (replaced as per reference notes above).
- †: Indicates player was designated as his team's closer.

The only position player able to participate who was not used was Adam Dunn. Lance Lynn and Huston Street were the pitchers not used by the National League. For the American League, pitchers Yu Darvish, Félix Hernández (who threw 114 pitches on July 8), Jake Peavy, and Chris Perez did not enter the game.

== Game summary ==
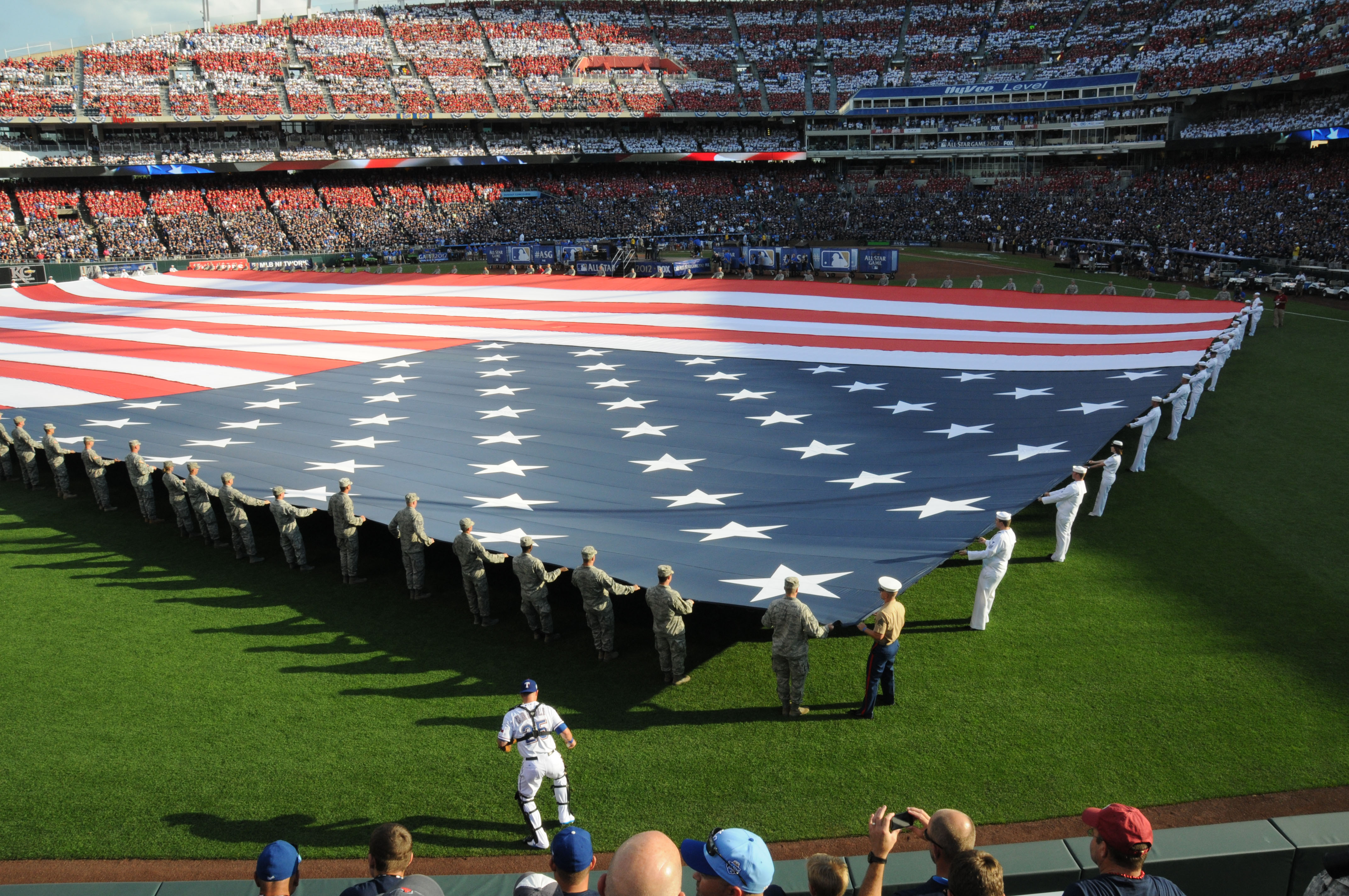
View of the stadium during the National Anthem at the 2012 All-Star Game

In the first inning, the National League scored five runs off of Justin Verlander. Melky Cabrera singled with one out, then scored on Ryan Braun's double. Two two-out walks loaded the bases before Pablo Sandoval cleared them with a triple to the right field corner. Sandoval then scored on Dan Uggla's single. In the fourth, Rafael Furcal tripled with two outs off of Matt Harrison and scored on Matt Holliday's single. Melky Cabrera's home run then capped the game's scoring. The AL had the bases loaded in the fifth off of Clayton Kershaw, but failed to drive in any runs and the NL won 8–0. It was the third straight season the AL lost in an All-Star game. With two hits and two RBI, Melky Cabrera was named the All-Star Game MVP and was the first Giants player to be named All-Star MVP since Bobby Bonds in the 1973 All-Star Game, which was also held in Kansas City.

=== Starters ===
National				American			
Order	Player	Team	Position	Order	Player	Team	Position
1	Carlos González	Rockies	DH	1	Derek Jeter	Yankees	SS
2	Melky Cabrera	Giants	CF	2	Robinson Canó	Yankees	2B
3	Ryan Braun	Brewers	LF	3	Josh Hamilton	Rangers	LF
4	Joey Votto	Reds	1B	4	José Bautista	Blue Jays	RF
5	Carlos Beltrán	Cardinals	RF	5	Prince Fielder	Tigers	1B
6	Buster Posey	Giants	C	6	Adrián Beltré	Rangers	3B
7	Pablo Sandoval	Giants	3B	7	David Ortiz	Red Sox	DH
8	Dan Uggla	Braves	2B	8	Mike Napoli	Rangers	C
9	Rafael Furcal	Cardinals	SS	9	Curtis Granderson	Yankees	CF
	Matt Cain	Giants	P		Justin Verlander	Tigers	P

=== Box score ===
Tuesday, July 10, 2012 7:18 pm (CDT) Kauffman Stadium in Kansas City, Missouri
Team	1	2	3	4	5	6	7	8	9	R	H	E
National League	5	0	0	3	0	0	0	0	0	8	10	0
American League	0	0	0	0	0	0	0	0	0	0	6	0
Starting pitchers: NL: Matt Cain; AL: Justin Verlander; WP: Matt Cain (1–0) LP: Justin Verlander (0–1); Home runs: NL: Melky Cabrera (1); AL: None

Umpires: Home Plate – Gerry Davis (crew chief); First Base – Jim Joyce; Second Base – Brian Runge; Third Base – Tony Randazzo; Left Field – Lance Barksdale; Right Field – Brian Knight
Weather: Temperature: 90 °F (32 °C), clear; Wind: 11 mph, in from left field
Time of Game: 2:59
Attendance: 40,933

== Notes ==
- Though he retired after the 2011 season, Tony La Russa managed the National League All-Stars, becoming only the second retired manager to manage an All-Star Game after John McGraw did it in 1933. With his win, La Russa became the first manager to win an All-Star Game in both leagues.
- Bryce Harper's selection to the All-Star Game at age 19 made him the third-youngest player ever to be named an All-Star, behind Dwight Gooden and Bob Feller, and the youngest ever position player.
- Gerry Davis umpired his fourth All-Star Game, second behind the plate. The other time Gerry Davis called balls and strikes was the 2002 tie game.
- The National League recorded a five-run inning for the fourth time, in the opening frame for the first time; 1954 (4th inning), 1969 (3rd inning), 2003 (5th inning). The A.L. has previously had three bigger innings in All-Star Game history.
- Pablo Sandoval highlighted the National League's big first inning with the first bases-loaded triple in the history of the Mid-summer Classic. It was the first of the senior circuit's All-Star Game record three triples in the game – the others coming in the fourth inning from Rafael Furcal and Ryan Braun, who became the first All-Star teammates to each triple in the same half-inning.
- Players from the eventual World Series champion San Francisco Giants (Sandoval, Melky Cabrera and Buster Posey)—who would therefore reap the benefits of the NL's win by gaining home-field advantage in the World Series—either scored and/or drove in seven of the eight runs, while teammate Matt Cain was the winning pitcher; conversely, the five first-inning runs were scored off Justin Verlander, whose Detroit Tigers would be their World Series opponent.
- Fox, the broadcasting network of the game in the United States, preempted the live broadcasts of "O Canada" and "The Star-Spangled Banner" (performed by Luke Bryan) for commercials. Kellie Pickler sang "God Bless America" during the 7th-inning stretch.
- This game was the last time the Houston Astros were represented as a team from the National League. The team moved to the American League West in 2013.
- Sixty-one players (32 N.L. and 29 A.L.) took part in the game, surpassing the nine-inning record of 60 set in 2011. This was the first time there was a shutout since the American League was shut out in the 1996 Major League Baseball All-Star Game.

== See also ==
- List of Major League Baseball All-Star Game winners
- All-Star Futures Game
- Home Run Derby
