= Brian Knight =

American baseball umpire (born 1974)

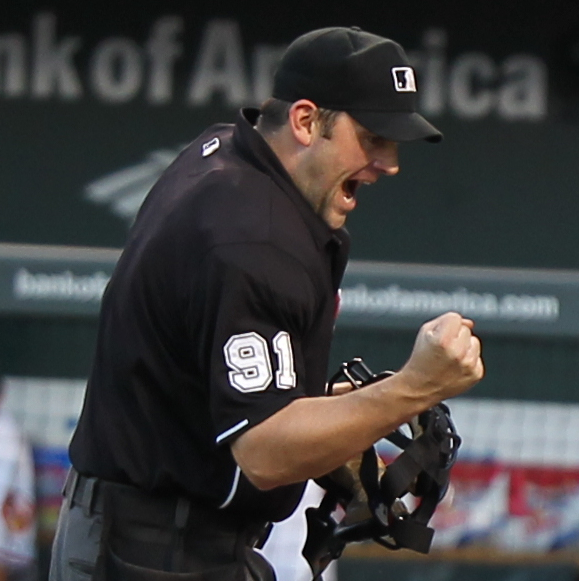
- Knight in 2011
- Umpire
- Born: October 2, 1974 (age 51); Helena, Montana, U.S.

MLB debut
- May 7, 2001

Last MLB appearance
- June 26, 2024

Career highlights and awards
- Special Assignments: Wild Card Games/Series (2013, 2020, 2022); Division Series (2014, 2015, 2021, 2023); League Championship Series (2022); World Series (2023); All-Star Game (2012); World Baseball Classic (2006, 2013, 2017)

Brian Michael Knight (born October 2, 1974) is an American former professional baseball umpire. He worked as a full-time Major League Baseball (MLB) umpire from 2011 until his retirement in 2025. He wore uniform number 91.

== Umpiring career ==
From 2001 to 2010, Knight was a minor league umpire who substituted as needed in the major leagues. His minor league service included the Pioneer, Midwest, Florida State, Southern, and Pacific Coast Leagues. He umpired the Tokyo in 2006 World Baseball Classic.

Knight umpired in the 2012 All-Star Game and the 2013 American League Wild Card Game, serving as the right field umpire under the tutelage of crew chief Gerry Davis on both occasions. Knight's first postseason game, the 2013 AL Wild Card, was played on his 39th birthday. Knight has also umpired in three Division Series (2014, 2015, 2021).

On August 1, 2025, MLB announced the retirement of Knight due to injuries, and the promotion of Charlie Ramos to the full time umpiring staff.

== Notable games ==
Knight was the home plate umpire for Jon Lester's no-hitter in 2008, and Josh Beckett's in 2014.

On April 18, 2015, he was hit in the face by a pitch by Blake Treinen in a game between the Nationals and Philadelphia Phillies. The 96 MPH fastball was missed by Jose Lobaton and knocked him to the ground.

== Personal life ==
Knight attended Capital High School in Helena, Montana and William Jewell College before enrolling in umpire school in 1995.

== See also ==
- List of Major League Baseball umpires (disambiguation)
