= Ryan Blakney =

American baseball umpire (born 1985)

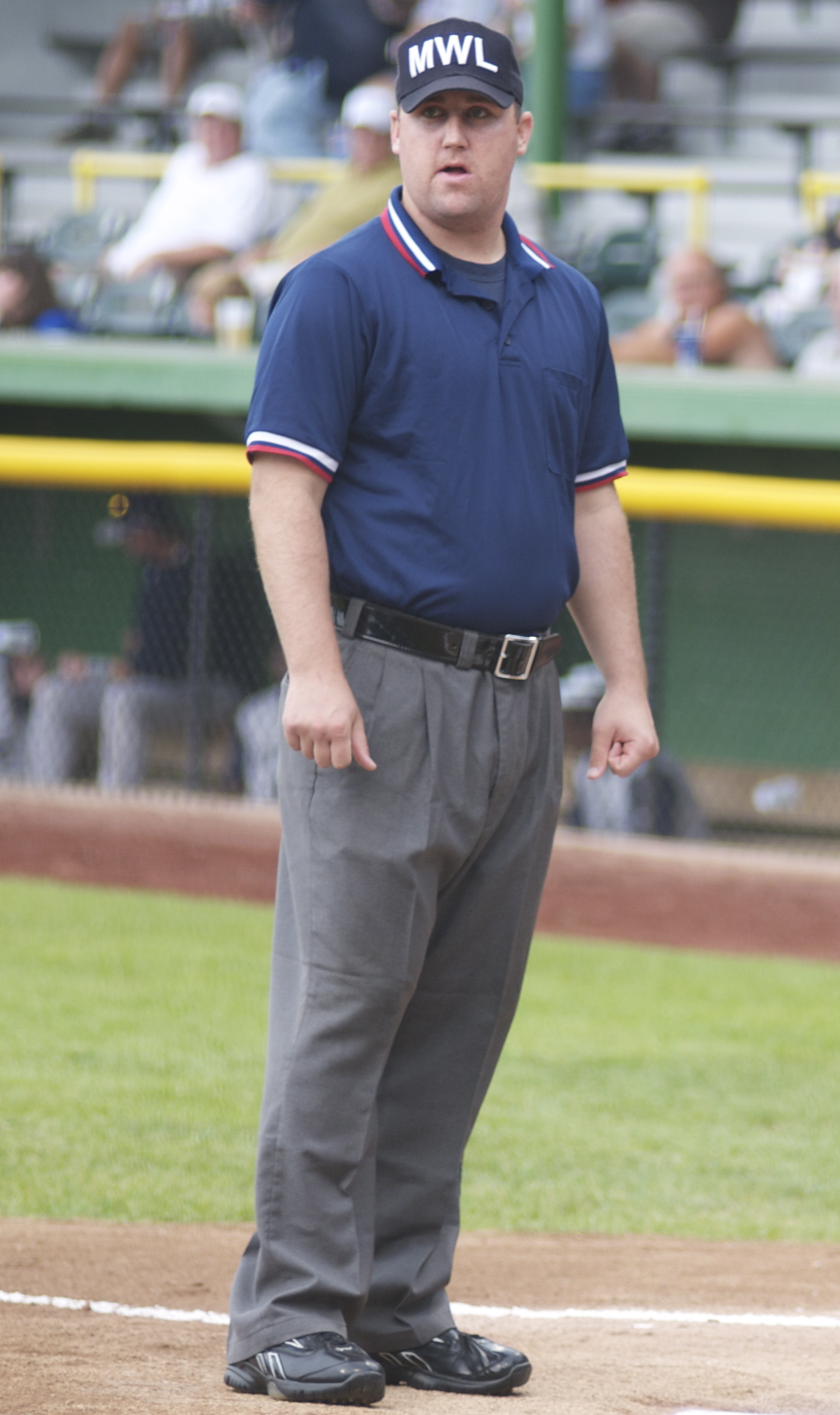
- Blakney in the Midwest League in 2008

MLB – No. 36
- Umpire
- Born: May 24, 1985 (age 40); Wenatchee, Washington, U.S.

MLB debut
- April 21, 2015

Crew information
- Umpiring crew: J
- Crew members: #51 Marvin Hudson (crew chief); #73 Tripp Gibson; #36 Ryan Blakney; #48 Nick Mahrley

Career highlights and awards
- Special Assignments: All-Star Games (2023); Wild Card Games/Series (2021); Division Series (2022, 2024, 2025); Field of Dreams Game (2022)

Ryan Benjamin Blakney (born May 24, 1985) is an American Major League Baseball (MLB) umpire. He has umpired in MLB since 2015.

== Career ==
Blakney made his MLB debut on April 21, 2015. For the 2018 regular season he was found to be one of the ten best home plate umpires in terms of accuracy in calling balls and strikes. His error rate was 7.97%. This was based on a study conducted at Boston University where 372,442 pitches were culled and analyzed. Blakney was promoted to a full-time umpiring position before the 2020 Major League Baseball season began.

Blakney was the home plate umpire during Reid Detmers's no-hitter on May 10, 2022.

On May 4, 2024, in a game between the New York Yankees and Detroit Tigers, Blakney called Yankees player Aaron Judge out on strikes on a pitch from Tigers pitcher Tyler Holton. When Judge disputed the call at the plate, Blakney ejected him, the first ejection of Judge's career.
