= Gerry Davis (umpire) =

American baseball umpire (born 1953)

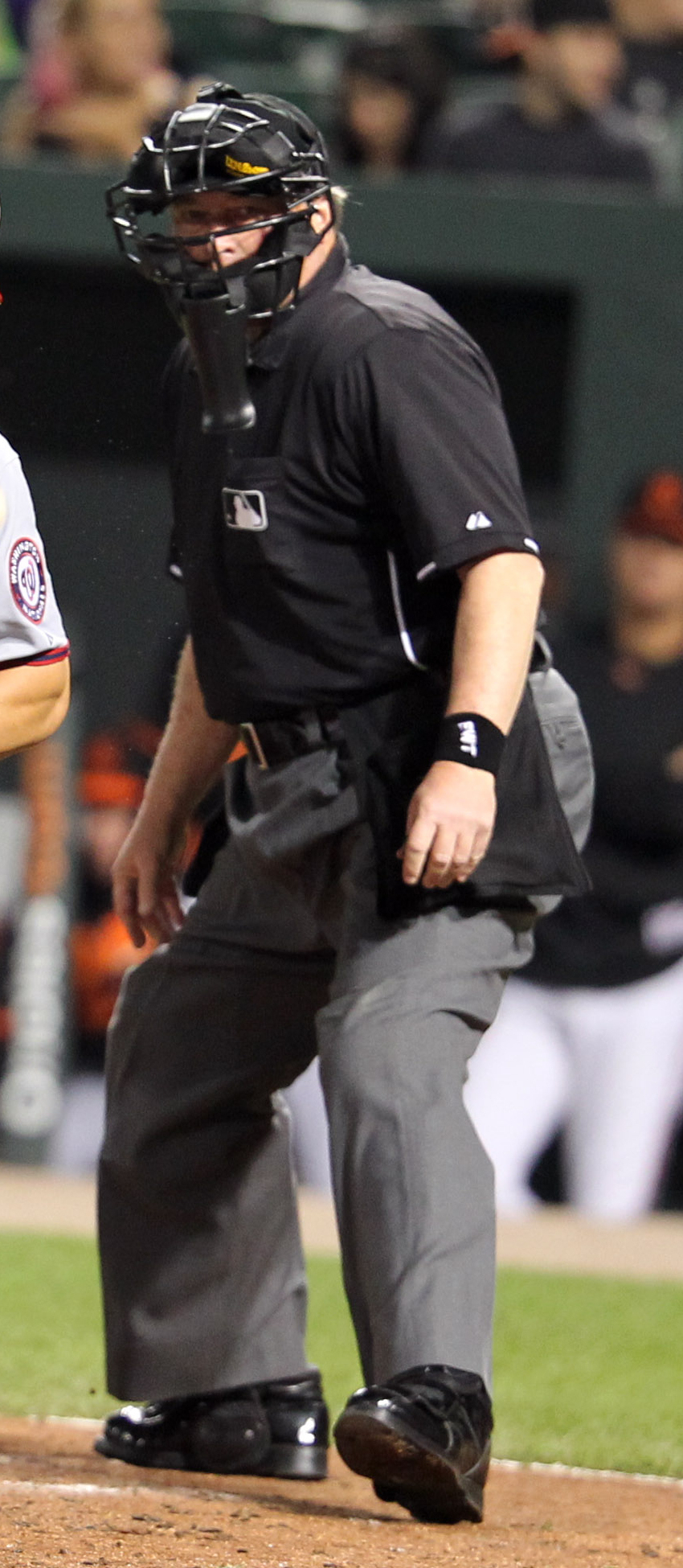
- Davis in 2011
- Born: February 22, 1953 (age 73); St. Louis, Missouri, U.S.

debut
- June 9, 1982

Last appearance
- October 3, 2021

Career highlights and awards
- Special Assignments: World Series (1996, 1999, 2004, 2009, 2012, 2017); League Championship Series (1990, 1992, 1995, 1998, 2000, 2001, 2005, 2010, 2013, 2014, 2018); Division Series (1996, 1999, 2002, 2003, 2004, 2006, 2007, 2008, 2009, 2011, 2012, 2015, 2017); Wild Card Games (2013, 2014, 2018); All-Star Games (1989, 1997, 2002, 2012); World Baseball Classic (2013); MLB Little League Classic (2017, 2018)

Gerald Sidney Davis (born February 22, 1953) is an American former umpire in Major League Baseball. He worked in the National League from 1982 to 1999 and in Major League Baseball from 2000 to 2021. He was promoted to crew chief in 1999. Davis worked a total of 151 post season games, the most in MLB history. He umpired six World Series, eleven League Championship Series and thirteen League Division Series. He also worked in the All-Star Game four times. Davis was chosen to work a Special Event in an All Time record 24 consecutive seasons. He wore uniform number 12 throughout his career.

== Umpiring career ==
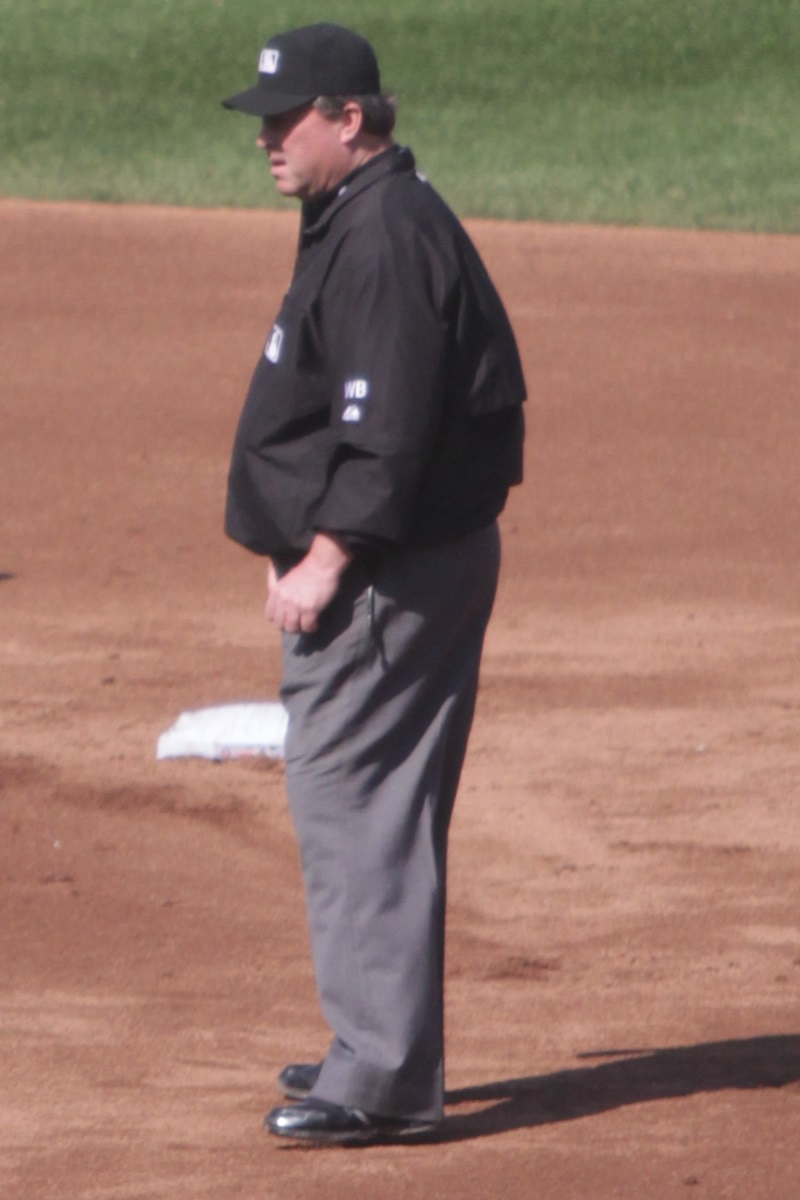
Davis in 2014

Davis began umpiring in the minor leagues in 1976. He worked in the Midwest League, Eastern League and American Association before being promoted to the majors in 1982.

He has officiated in 22 postseasons, including the World Series in 1996, 1999, 2004, 2009 2012 and 2017, the League Championship Series in 1990, 1992, 1995, 1998, 2000, 2001, 2005, 2010, 2013, 2014, and 2018; the Division Series in 1996, 1999, 2002, 2003, 2004, 2006, 2007, 2008, 2009, 2011, 2012, and 2015; and the Wild Card Game in 2013, 2014 and 2018. He also umpired the All-Star Game in 1989, 1997, 2002 and 2012; he called balls and strikes on the last two occasions.

Davis opted out of the 2020 season due to concerns from the coronavirus pandemic. He umpired his last game on October 3, 2021, in St. Louis. Davis holds the record for the most postseason games officiated in MLB.

=== Notable games ===
Davis was the second base umpire for the perfect game pitched by Randy Johnson on May 18, 2004.

On September 19, 2008, at Tropicana Field, instant replay overturned a call on the field for the first time ever in the major leagues. A fly ball hit by Tampa Bay Rays' first baseman Carlos Peña, the umpires ruled, was interfered with by a fan sitting in the front row of the stands, when the ball hit the hands of the fan and fell back onto the field of play. After Joe Maddon requested the umpires hold a conference to discuss the play, the umpires, headed by Gerry Davis, decided to look at instant replay. Just over four minutes later, Davis returned to the field and signaled that the ball was a home run.

Davis was the home plate umpire for the last game played at Shea Stadium on September 28, 2008.

With his assignment to the 2012 World Series, Davis set an officiating record for most postseason games umpired in major league history with 115 and since then this mark has moved forward to 151 games.

On April 23, 2014, Davis ejected New York Yankees starting pitcher Michael Pineda for having pine tar on his neck.

On July 26, 2017, Davis asked Texas Rangers third baseman Adrián Beltré to move closer to the on-deck circle. After Beltré jokingly moved the on-deck batting circle, Davis ejected him.

== Personal life ==
Davis was diagnosed with atrial fibrillation in 2021, causing him to miss the first four months of the 2021 season.

He is married to Linda.
