= Tony Randazzo (umpire) =

American baseball umpire (born 1965)

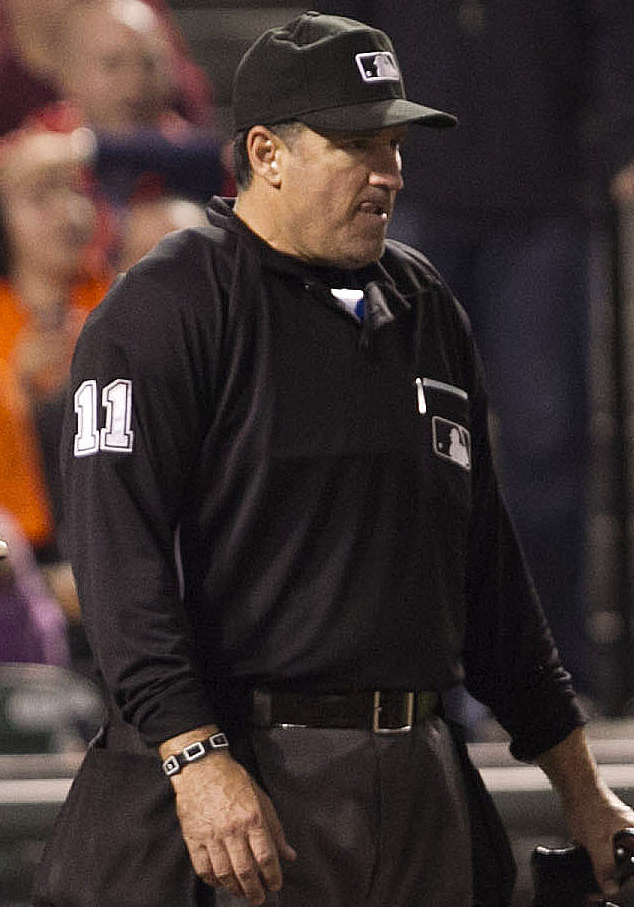
- Randazzo in 2012
- Umpire
- Born: January 11, 1965 (age 61); Chicago, Illinois, U.S.

MLB debut
- August 13, 1999

Last MLB appearance
- October 8, 2025

Career highlights and awards
- Special Assignments: All-Star Game (2001, 2012); Wild Card Games/Series (2024); Division Series (2004, 2006, 2009, 2011, 2012, 2013, 2016, 2021, 2025); League Championship Series (2010, 2015); World Series (2016); MLB Little League Classic (2017)

Anthony John Randazzo (born Anthony Grasso; January 11, 1965) is an American former umpire in Major League Baseball. After working in the National League in 1999, he has umpired in both Major Leagues since 2000.

== Early life ==
Anthony was born on January 11, 1965, to Linda (née Collins) and Carl Grasso. His parents divorced and both remarried. After his mother married George Randazzo in 1977, Anthony adopted the surname Randazzo. He graduated from Lake Park High School in Roselle, Illinois. He attended Iowa Western Community College and played college baseball as a catcher before injuries ended his playing career. He left college and attended the Harry Wendelstedt Umpire School shortly thereafter.

== Umpiring career ==
Randazzo has umpired in nine Division Series (2004, 2006, 2009, 2011, 2012, 2013, 2016, 2021, 2025), two League Championship Series (2010, 2015), and the 2016 World Series. He has also officiated in two All-Star Games (2001, 2012).

On July 5, 2026, USA Today's Bob Nightengale reported that Randazzo was one of seven umpires who had accepted a buyout from Major League Baseball to retire after the 2026 season. Randazzo did not umpire a game that season.

== Personal life ==
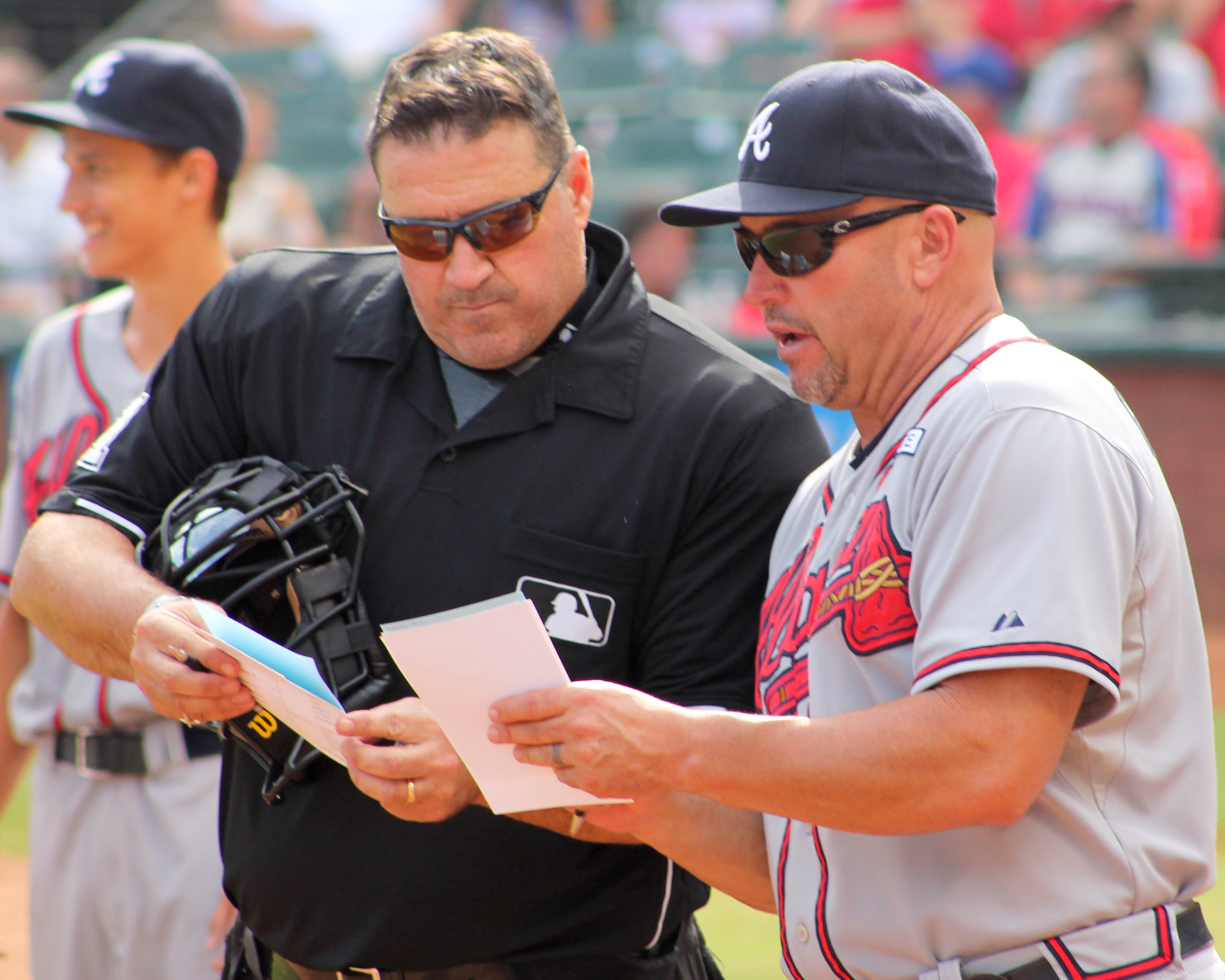
Randazzo (left) confers with Atlanta Braves manager Fredi González in 2014

Randazzo is married and has three children. Randazzo's father George is founder and chairman of the National Italian American Sports Hall of Fame. His brother Marc is a Florida restaurant owner and former World Boxing Council Continental Cruiserweight Champion. He is also the cousin of Wayne Randazzo, the television play-by-play announcer for the Los Angeles Angels.

== See also ==
- List of Major League Baseball umpires (disambiguation)
