= MLB Speedway Classic =

Special Major League Baseball event

MLB Speedway Classic '25
	1	2	3	4	5	6	7	8	9	R	H	E
Atlanta Braves	0	3	0	0	0	0	1	0	0	4	10	0
Cincinnati Reds	1	1	0	0	0	0	0	0	0	2	10	0
- Date: August 2–3, 2025 (Note: Events in a suspended game are considered (with regards to baseball statistics) to have occurred on the original game date.)
- Venue: Bristol Motor Speedway
- City: Bristol, Tennessee
- Managers: Brian Snitker (Atlanta Braves); Terry Francona (Cincinnati Reds)
- Umpires: HP: Will Little; 1B: Ryan Additon; 2B: Junior Valentine; 3B: Lance Barksdale (Note: Crew chief)
- Attendance: 91,032
- Time of game: 9:40 PM EDT (Aug 2) (Note: Originally scheduled for 7:15 PM EDT); 1:00 PM EDT (Aug 3)
- Ceremonial first pitch: Chipper Jones, Kyle Busch (Note: Jones' pitch was caught by Chase Elliott, while Busch's pitch was caught by Johnny Bench.)
- Television: Fox
- TV announcers: Joe Davis (play-by-play); John Smoltz (analyst); Ken Rosenthal (reporter); Tom Verducci (reporter)

The MLB Speedway Classic, also known as the MLB Speedway Classic '25, was a Major League Baseball (MLB) specialty game between the Atlanta Braves and the Cincinnati Reds, which began on August 2, 2025, and continued on the weekend's rain date of August 3, 2025, due to continuing showers and poor field conditions on its original date. The Braves defeated the Reds, 4–2. The game was played in the infield of Bristol Motor Speedway in Bristol, Tennessee, the home of a 146,000-seat NASCAR racetrack. This was the first regular-season National League or American League game played in the state of Tennessee.

An attendance of 91,032 set a new all-time regular-season game attendance record, exceeded only by the attendance of 115,300 at a preseason game between the Boston Red Sox and Los Angeles Dodgers at the Los Angeles Memorial Coliseum on March 29, 2008.

== Background ==
=== Game background ===
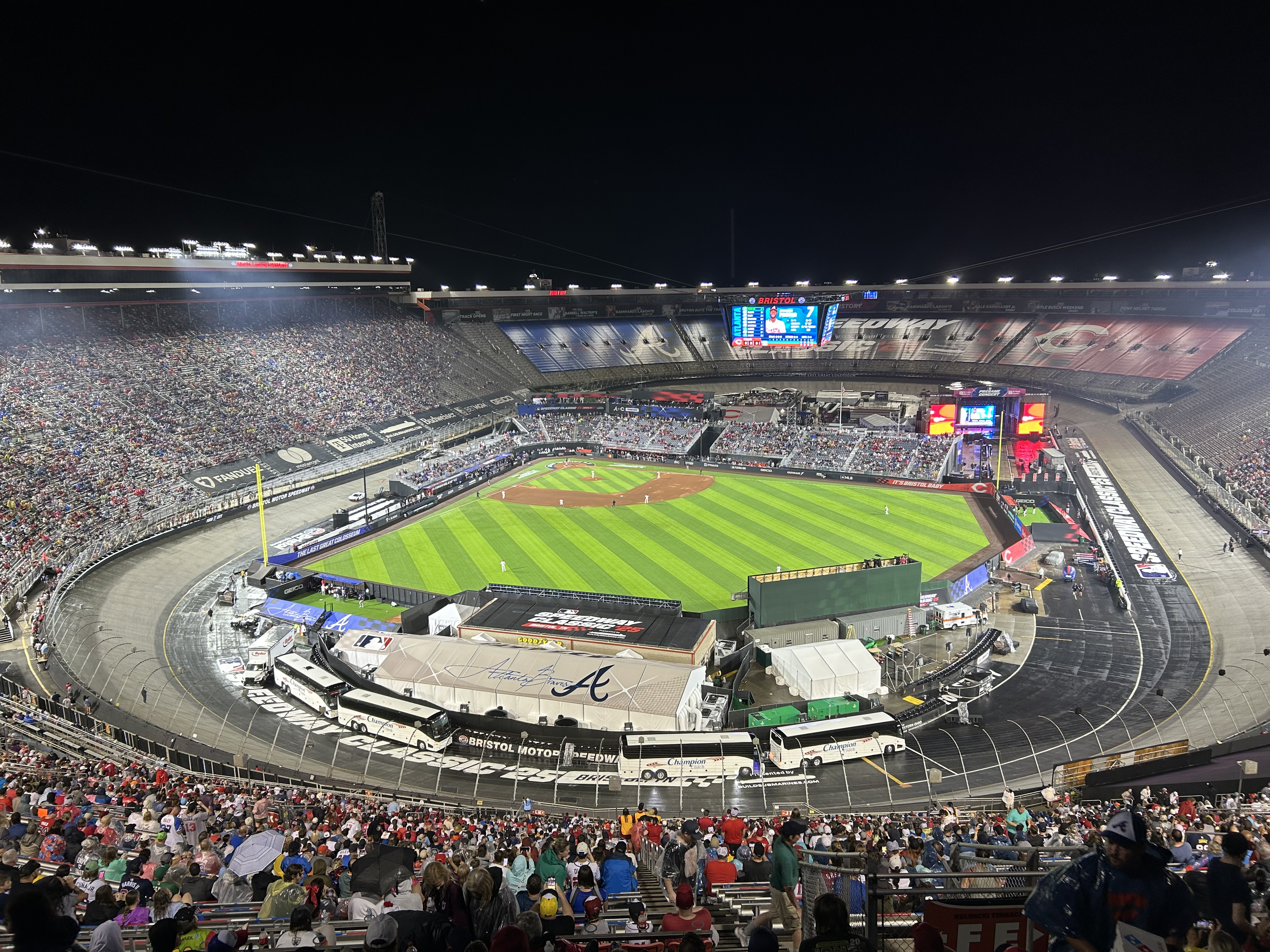
The field shortly before the first pitch of the MLB Speedway Classic '25

On August 6, 2024, reports surfaced that the Braves and Reds would play a game at Bristol Motor Speedway in 2025. Three days later, on August 9, MLB revealed the game would be happening, under the name, Speedway Classic '25.

=== Construction & field dimensions ===
Bristol Motor Speedway map

The field dimensions for the MLB Speedway Classic were 330 feet down each of the foul lines, 400 feet to center field, 375 feet to the right-field alley, and 384 feet to the left-field alley. The diamond was built across the track and infield of the speedway, primarily situated between Turns 3 and 4 of the track (south west section of the speedway). Turns 1 and 2 would have a stage for the pregame concert. In late June 2025, construction started for the conversion of Bristol Motor Speedway. The field was announced to be AstroTurf-provided artificial turf surface with a traditional dirt infield on June 25, due to the asphalt and concrete surface of its footprint providing a poor bed for natural grass, and to allow the turf to be re-used for other purposes after the game. The turf was subsequently donated to East Tennessee State University for use at Thomas Stadium, the ballpark of the East Tennessee State Buccaneers baseball team.

=== Pregame concert ===
Like previous MLB Specialty Games, Bristol Motor Speedway hosted a pregame concert. Bristol is a border city divided by the Tennessee and Virginia state lines, and is known as the "birthplace of country music." In celebration of those roots, Grammy Award-winning artist Tim McGraw would headline a special pregame concert leading into the MLB Speedway Classic. The concert also included Grammy-winning artist Pitbull, and Jake Owen. The concert started approximately one hour before the first pitch and Fox featured portions of the performance during its pregame event coverage.

=== Fan zone ===
Along with the concert, there was also a fan zone outside of the stadium that features a full day of live music including Owen, Timothy Wayne, Reyna Roberts, and Adam Doleac. There were also interactive games, a 110-foot Ferris wheel, batting cages, pitching tunnels, regional food, exhibits, and photo opportunities.

=== Uniforms ===
In early July, reports surfaced that the Braves jerseys were navy with gray pants, and featured an italicized font for the numbers on the back of the jerseys. There was also a sleeve patch that had the MLB Speedway Classic '25 logo on it. On July 21, MLB released the uniform concepts for both teams, with the Braves having a navy hat with red flames on the brim. The Reds wore their white uniforms also with the italicized numbers on the front and back of their jerseys, and with their red hat with a black brim with a checkerboard pattern.

Reds catcher Tyler Stephenson revealed his catcher's gear for the game, which was influenced by Ricky Bobby from the 2006 movie Talladega Nights: The Ballad of Ricky Bobby with a Wonder Bread style design.

=== Umpires ===
On July 31, Major League Baseball Umpire Crew I was assigned for the Speedway Classic series. Johnson City, TN native Will Little worked behind the plate calling balls and strikes, while Ryan Additon was the first base umpire. Ryan Willis was replaced by Tennessee native Junior Valentine at second base for the game, and crew chief Lance Barksdale oversaw third base. Little grew up less than 20 miles away from Bristol Motor Speedway, and the Speedway Classic would be a homecoming for him.

== Rosters ==
Atlanta Braves roster
Starting pitchers: 59 Carlos Carrasco; 55 Bryce Elder; 22 Erick Fedde; 99 Spencer Strider; 33 Joey Wentz	Bullpen: 49 Aaron Bummer; 68 Austin Cox; 46 Dylan Dodd; 62 Daysbel Hernández; 26 Raisel Iglesias; 38 Pierce Johnson; 45 Tyler Kinley; 52 Dylan Lee; 64 Hurston Waldrep (Note: Recalled from AAA Gwinnett in between the August 2 and 3 game.)	Catchers: 30 Drake Baldwin; 9 Sandy León; 12 Sean Murphy; Infielders: 1 Ozzie Albies; 2 Nick Allen; 28 Matt Olson; 19 Jonathan Ornelas (Note: Optioned to AAA Gwinnett after the August 2 rainout.); 27 Austin Riley; 37 Luke Williams	Outfielders: 23 Michael Harris II; 24 Jarred Kelenic; 7 Jurickson Profar; 36 Eli White; Designated hitters: 20 Marcell Ozuna	Manager: 43 Brian Snitker; Coaches: 85 Erick Abreu (bullpen); 86 Fredi González (third base); 88 Tom Goodwin (first base); 80 Tim Hyers (hitting); 10 Chipper Jones (hitting consultant); 39 Rick Kranitz (pitching); 83 Carlos Méndez (assistant hitting); 95 Eddie Pérez (assistant); 82 Hugh Quattlebaum (assistant hitting); 4 Walt Weiss (bench); 96 José Yepez (bullpen catcher)

Cincinnati Reds roster
Starting pitchers: 41 Andrew Abbott; 26 Chase Burns; 52 Zack Littell; 40 Nick Lodolo; 28 Nick Martinez; 51 Brady Singer	Bullpen: 23 Graham Ashcraft; 58 Scott Barlow; 62 Luis Mey; 50 Sam Moll; 15 Emilio Pagán; 12 Lyon Richardson (Note: Recalled from AAA Louisville in between the August 2 and 3 game.); 64 Tony Santillan; 31 Brent Suter	Catchers: 37 Tyler Stephenson; 35 Jose Trevino; Infielders: 38 Miguel Andújar; 44 Elly De La Cruz; 4 Santiago Espinal; 3 Ke'Bryan Hayes; 16 Noelvi Marte; 9 Matt McLain; 7 Spencer Steer	Outfielders: 30 Will Benson (Note: Optioned to AAA Louisville after the August 2 rainout.); 27 Jake Fraley; 29 TJ Friedl; 12 Austin Hays; 2 Gavin Lux	Manager: 77 Terry Francona; Coaches: 92 Kyle Arnsberg (assistant coach); 45 Freddie Benavides (bench coach/field coordinator); 54 Collin Cowgill (first base); 91 Jose Duarte (bullpen catcher); 56 J. R. House (third base/catching); 36 Derek Johnson (director of pitching); 95 James Keller (bullpen catcher); 96 Simon Mathews (assistant pitching); 73 Brad Mills (bench coach); 75 Mike Napoli (staff assistant); 93 Alex Pelaez (assistant hitting); 94 Will Remillard (assistant hitting); 90 Matt Tracy (bullpen); 76 Chris Valaika (hitting)

== Game ==
=== Scheduling ===
The game was the first regular season MLB game in the state of Tennessee, and the first MLB game played on a race track. The game was on the first Saturday of August, and was the finale of a three-game series with the first two games being played at Great American Ball Park in Cincinnati.

=== Lineups ===
No.	Player	Pos.
Atlanta
7	Jurickson Profar	LF
28	Matt Olson	1B
27	Austin Riley	3B
30	Drake Baldwin	DH
12	Sean Murphy	C
23	Michael Harris II	CF
1	Ozzie Albies	2B
36	Eli White	RF
2	Nick Allen	SS
Starting pitcher
~~99~~ 66	~~Spencer Strider~~ Austin Cox	

No.	Player	Pos.
Cincinnati
29	TJ Friedl	CF
9	Matt McLain	2B
44	Elly De La Cruz	SS
12	Austin Hays	DH
~~2~~ 38	~~Gavin Lux~~ Miguel Andújar	LF
16	Noelvi Marte	RF
7	Spencer Steer	1B
37	Tyler Stephenson	C
3	Ke'Bryan Hayes	3B
Starting pitcher
26	Chase Burns	

=== Recap ===
During the days leading up to the special event, Major League Baseball commissioner Rob Manfred revealed a plan to push the game back to August 3 if the game were to be deemed unplayable due to inclement weather on August 2. Spencer Strider of Atlanta and Chase Burns of Cincinnati, both Tennessee natives, were supposed to start the game for their respective ball clubs for the Speedway Classic. During the pregame, the players rode around in Chevrolet pickup trucks as Pitbull and Tim McGraw performed songs including "I Like It, I Love It" during the pregame concert. The players then entered through the outfield for their team introductions, and just after warming up, the grounds crew rolled the tarp out onto the field. Heavy downpours persisted, and following a two-hour, 25 minute rain delay, Austin Cox replaced Strider as the Braves starter at the 9:40 p.m. first pitch.

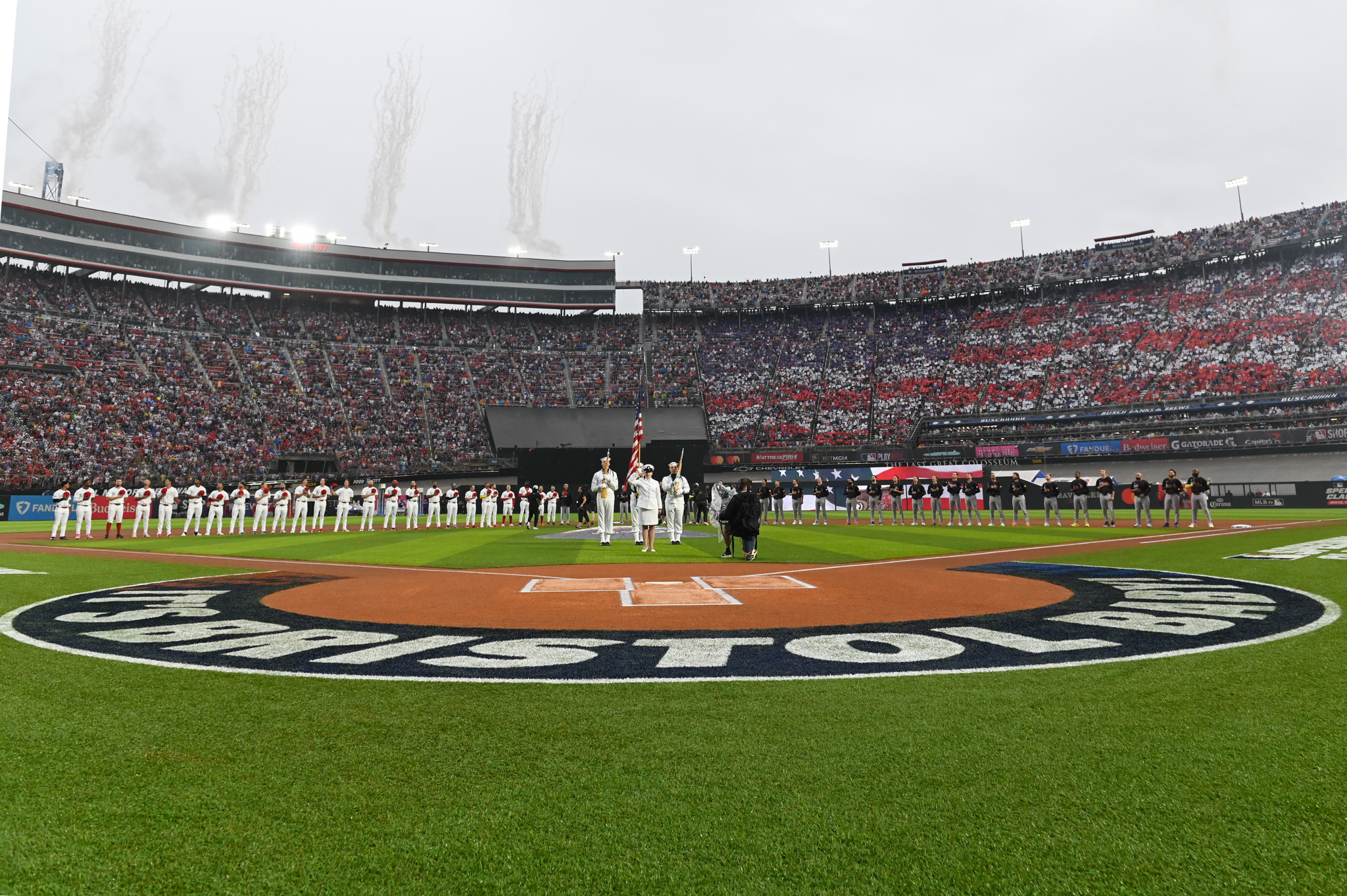
A United States Navy color guard on the field pregame on August 2

August 2: During the first pitch by Chase Burns, it was still lightly raining as he struck out Jurickson Profar and Austin Riley for a 1-2-3 inning. In the bottom of the first, Matt McLain and Elly De La Cruz both reached on infield singles with showers dumping onto the infield. Austin Hays singled to left and drove home McLain, giving the Reds an early 1–0 lead. Water began to pool on the infield during the bottom of the first inning which caused the umpires to suspend the game after four batters in the bottom of the first. Only 16 minutes into the game, the grounds-keeping crew tried to dry out and remove puddles of water by pouring clay and raking the infield, then tarped the field. At 10:25 p.m., it was announced that the game was suspended and would resume the following day at 1 p.m.

August 3: On August 3, at 1 p.m. EDT, during the resumption of the bottom of the first, De La Cruz immediately stole third base off of pitcher Hurston Waldrep who drove five hours before the game from AAA Gwinnett after getting recalled. Miguel Andujar then hit a ball to third, and Riley ran De La Cruz down to tag him out at home. The Braves answered in the top of the second with singles from Michael Harris II and Ozzie Albies, which led to a 3-run home run by Eli White, giving the Braves a 3–1 lead. In the bottom of the 2nd, with the bases loaded, McClain hit a sacrifice fly to center field, scoring Tyler Stephenson to cut the deficit to 3–2. After dominant outings by Waldrep, Luis Mey, and Sam Moll, Scott Barlow was chosen to pitch the 7th inning for the Reds, and gave up a solo-home run to White for his second home run of the game. In the bottom of the 9th inning with a 4–2 lead, Raisel Iglesias came into close the game. After two singles given up to TJ Friedl and McClain, Iglesias retired the side by striking out De La Cruz, fouling out Hayes, and popping pinch hitter Jake Fraley to get the save, and the Speedway Classic trophy.

=== Line score ===
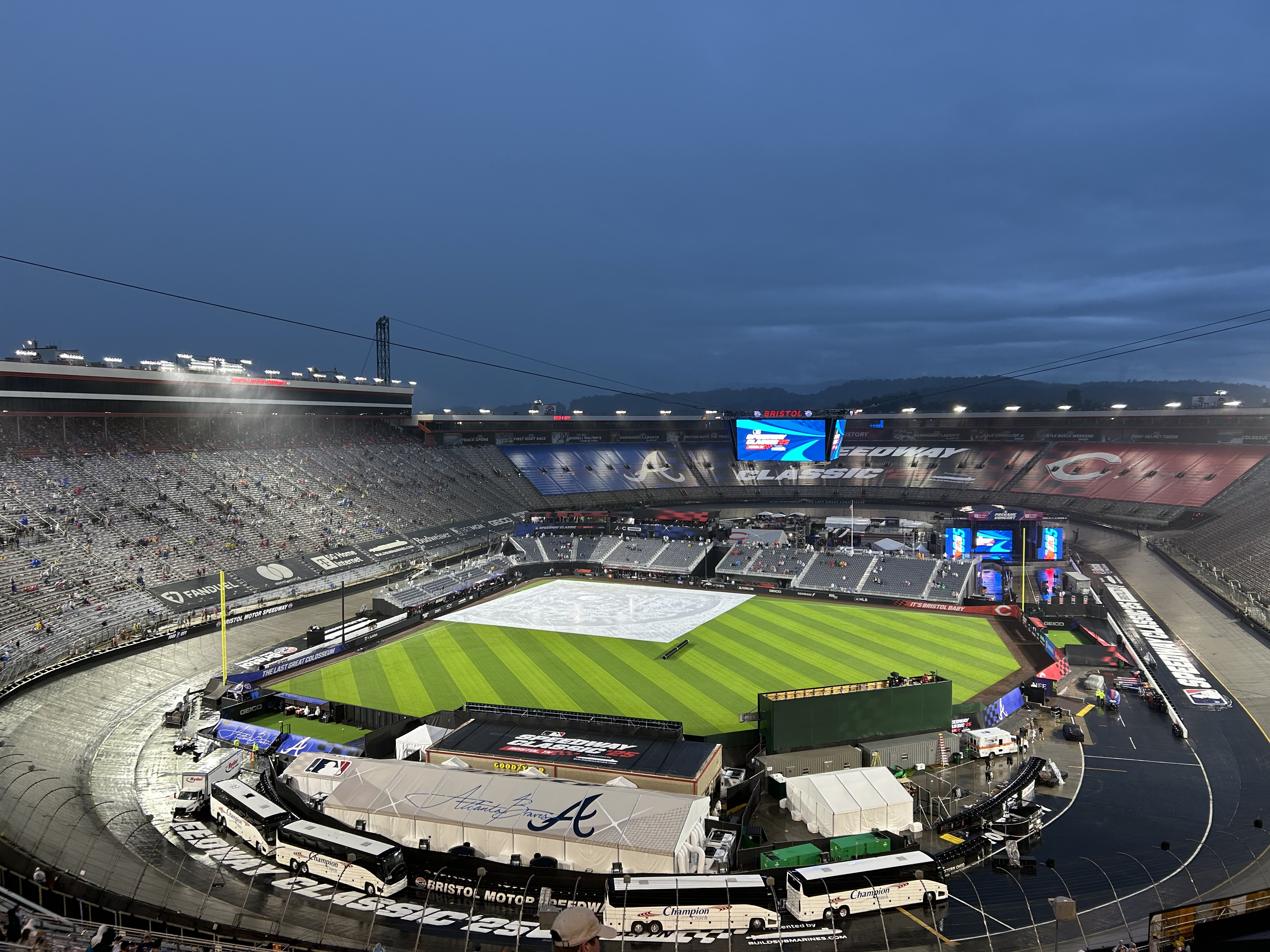
The tarp on the field during a rain delay at the MLB Speedway Classic '25

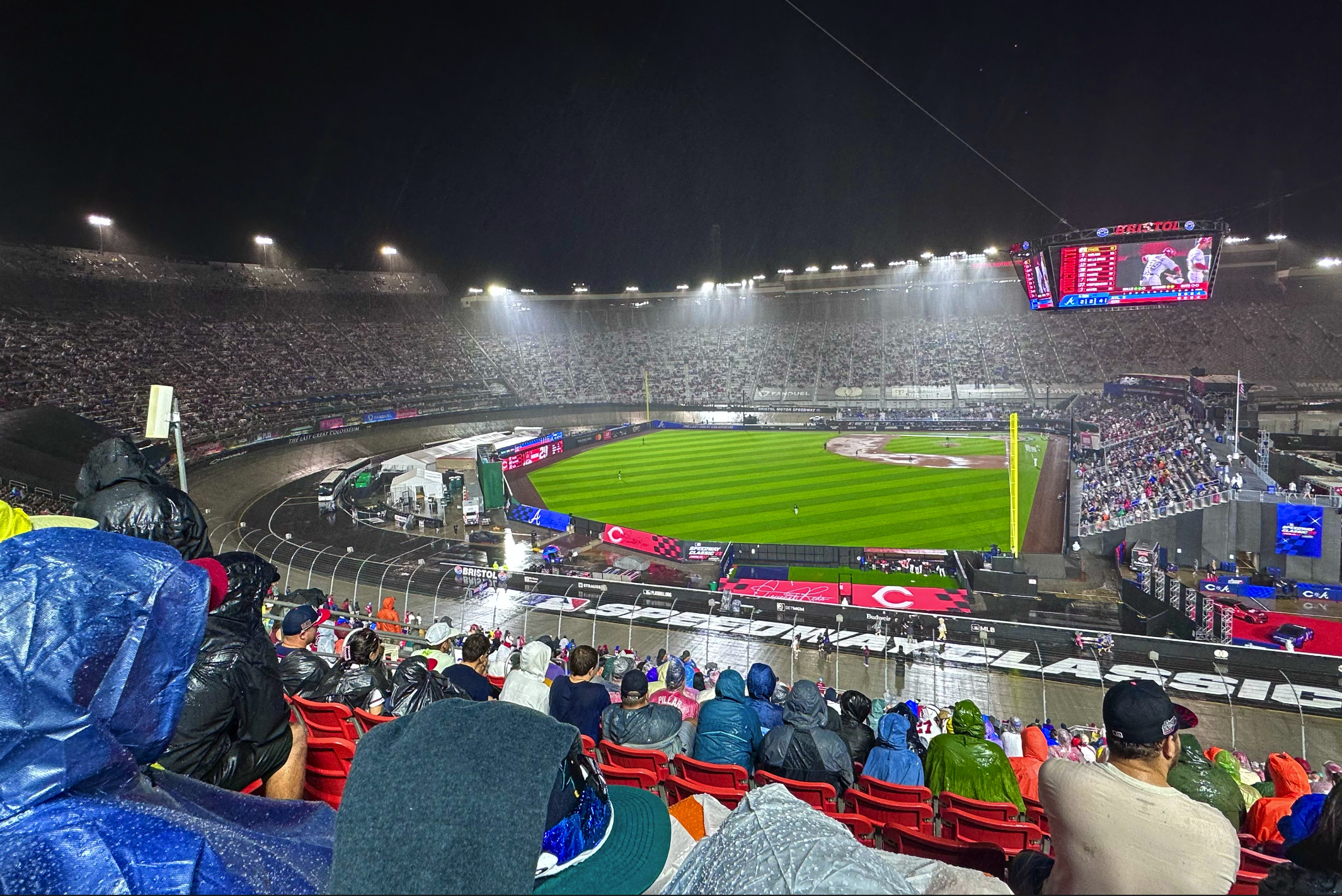
Infield soaking wet during the bottom of the first at the MLB Speedway Classic '25

August 2–3, 2025 9:40 p.m. (Aug 2)-1:00 p.m. (Aug 3) EDT (Note: The game was originally scheduled for 7:15, but was delayed for 2 hours and 25 minutes and subsequently suspended to the next day at 1:00 p.m. due to weather in the Bristol area.) at Bristol Motor Speedway in Bristol, Tennessee
Team	1	2	3	4	5	6	7	8	9	R	H	E
Atlanta Braves	0	3	0	0	0	0	1	0	0	4	10	0
Cincinnati Reds	1	1	0	0	0	0	0	0	0	2	10	0
Starting pitchers: Atlanta: Austin Cox; Cincinnati: Chase Burns; WP: Hurston Waldrep (1–0) LP: Brent Suter (1–2) Sv: Raisel Iglesias (14); Home runs: Atlanta: Eli White 2(6); Cincinnati: None; Attendance: 91,032 Time: 2:41; Umpires: HP – Will Little; 1B – Ryan Additon; 2B – Junior Valentine; 3B – Lance Barksdale; Replay Official – Ryan Willis; Boxscore

=== Box score ===
Batting

Braves	AB	R	H	RBI	BB	SO	OPS
Jurickson Profar, LF	5	0	2	0	0	2	.680
Matt Olson, 1B	4	0	0	0	0	1	.813
Austin Riley, 3B	1	0	0	0	0	1	.737
Luke Williams, PH–3B	3	0	0	0	0	1	.348
Drake Baldwin, DH	4	0	2	0	0	1	.814
Sean Murphy, C	4	0	0	0	0	1	.807
Michael Harris II, CF	4	1	2	0	0	1	.636
Ozzie Albies, 2B	4	1	1	0	0	1	.638
Eli White, RF	4	2	2	4	0	1	.700
Nick Allen, 2B	3	0	1	0	1	1	.556

Reds	AB	R	H	RBI	BB	SO	OPS
TJ Friedl, CF	4	0	2	0	1	1	.773
Matt McLain, 2B	4	1	2	1	0	1	.651
Elly De La Cruz, SS	5	0	1	0	0	1	.843
Austin Hays, DH	5	0	1	1	0	1	.808
Miguel Andujar, LF	2	0	0	0	0	1	.758
Gavin Lux, PH–LF	1	0	1	0	0	0	.735
Santiago Espinal, PH–LF	1	0	0	0	0	1	.601
Jake Fraley, PH	1	0	0	0	0	0	.756
Noelvi Marte, RF	4	0	1	0	0	1	.802
Spencer Steer, 1B	3	0	0	0	1	0	.693
Tyler Stephenson, C	2	1	0	0	2	0	.727
Ke'Bryan Hayes, 3B	4	0	2	0	0	0	.575

Pitching

Braves	IP	H	R	ER	BB	SO	HR	ERA
Austin Cox	0.1	3	1	1	0	1	0	3.24
Hurston Waldrep (W)	5.2	3	1	1	2	4	0	1.59
Pierce Johnson (H)	0.2	1	0	0	0	0	0	2.41
Dylan Lee (H)	1	1	0	0	0	1	0	3.10
Tyler Kinley (H)	0.1	0	0	0	2	0	0	5.51
Raisel Iglesias (S)	1	2	0	0	0	1	0	5.51

Reds	IP	H	R	ER	BB	SO	HR	ERA
Chase Burns	1	0	0	0	0	2	0	6.04
Brent Suter (L)	2.2	4	3	3	0	2	1	3.38
Luis Mey	1.1	2	0	0	0	2	0	3.78
Sam Moll	1	1	0	0	0	1	0	8.10
Scott Barlow	1	2	1	1	0	1	1	3.91
Lyon Richardson	2	1	0	0	1	3	0	3.93

== See also ==
- List of neutral site regular season Major League Baseball games played in the United States and Canada
- Battle at Bristol, a college football game held at the same venue.
