= Ryan Additon =

American baseball umpire (born 1985)

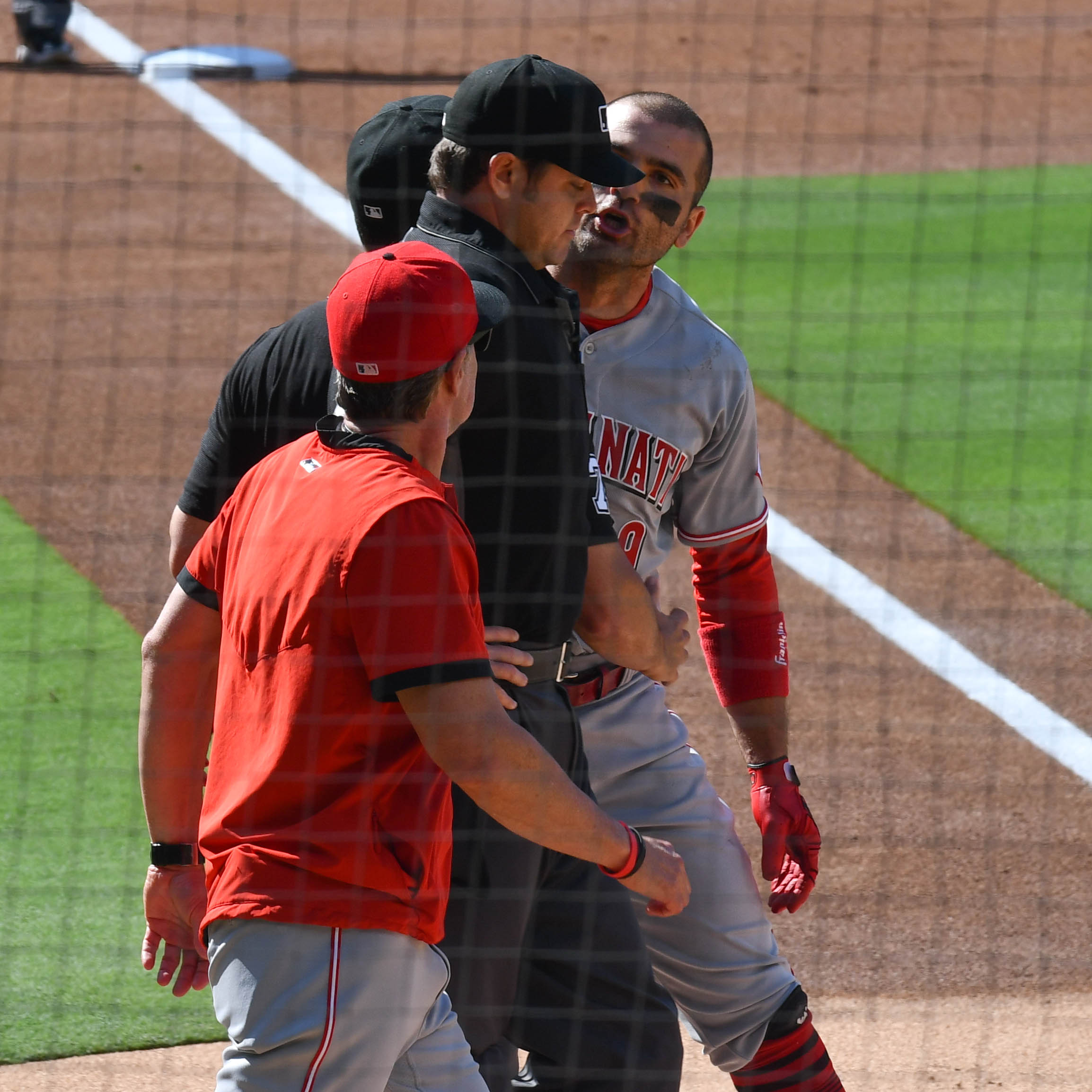
- Additon (centre) talks with Joey Votto following his ejection from a 2021 game

MLB – No. 67
- Umpire
- Born: December 5, 1985 (age 40); Miami, Florida, U.S.

MLB debut
- May 21, 2017
- Stats at Baseball Reference

Crew information
- Umpiring crew: G
- Crew members: #23 Lance Barksdale (crew chief); #93 Will Little; #67 Ryan Additon; #20 Ryan Wills

Career highlights and awards
- Special Assignments: League Championship Series (2025, 2026); Division Series (2023); Wild Card Games/Series (2024, 2025, 2026); All-Star Games (2026); MLB Speedway Classic (2025); World Baseball Classic (2026)

Ryan Blair Additon (born December 5, 1985) is an American umpire in Major League Baseball. After graduating from Lynn University, he pitched one season for the Kalamazoo Kings of the Frontier League. He wears uniform number 67.

== Career ==
Additon attended Western High School in Davie, Florida, and was selected by the San Francisco Giants in the 42nd round of the 2004 Major League Baseball draft. He opted to play baseball at Lynn University, then continued his playing career with the Kalamazoo Kings of the Frontier League for the 2008 season. Additon was hired as a professional baseball umpire in 2010 and started in the Gulf Coast League. By the 2016 season, Additon had been promoted to the Triple-A level. He began working as a call-up umpire during the 2017 Major League Baseball season, making his debut on May 21, 2017, working at first base during a game Target Field. As a call-up umpire, Additon was behind home plate when Corey Kluber pitched a no-hitter on May 19, 2021. He was promoted to the full-time MLB staff on February 4, 2022.

Additon’s first MLB postseason assignment was the 2023 National League Division Series between the Los Angeles Dodgers and Arizona Diamondbacks.

On July 10, 2026 Additon was named as an umpire for the 2026 Major League Baseball All-Star Game.

== Personal life ==
Ryan Additon's younger brother Nick was a professional baseball player in the KBO League and Chinese Professional Baseball League.
