= Will Little =

American baseball umpire (born 1984)

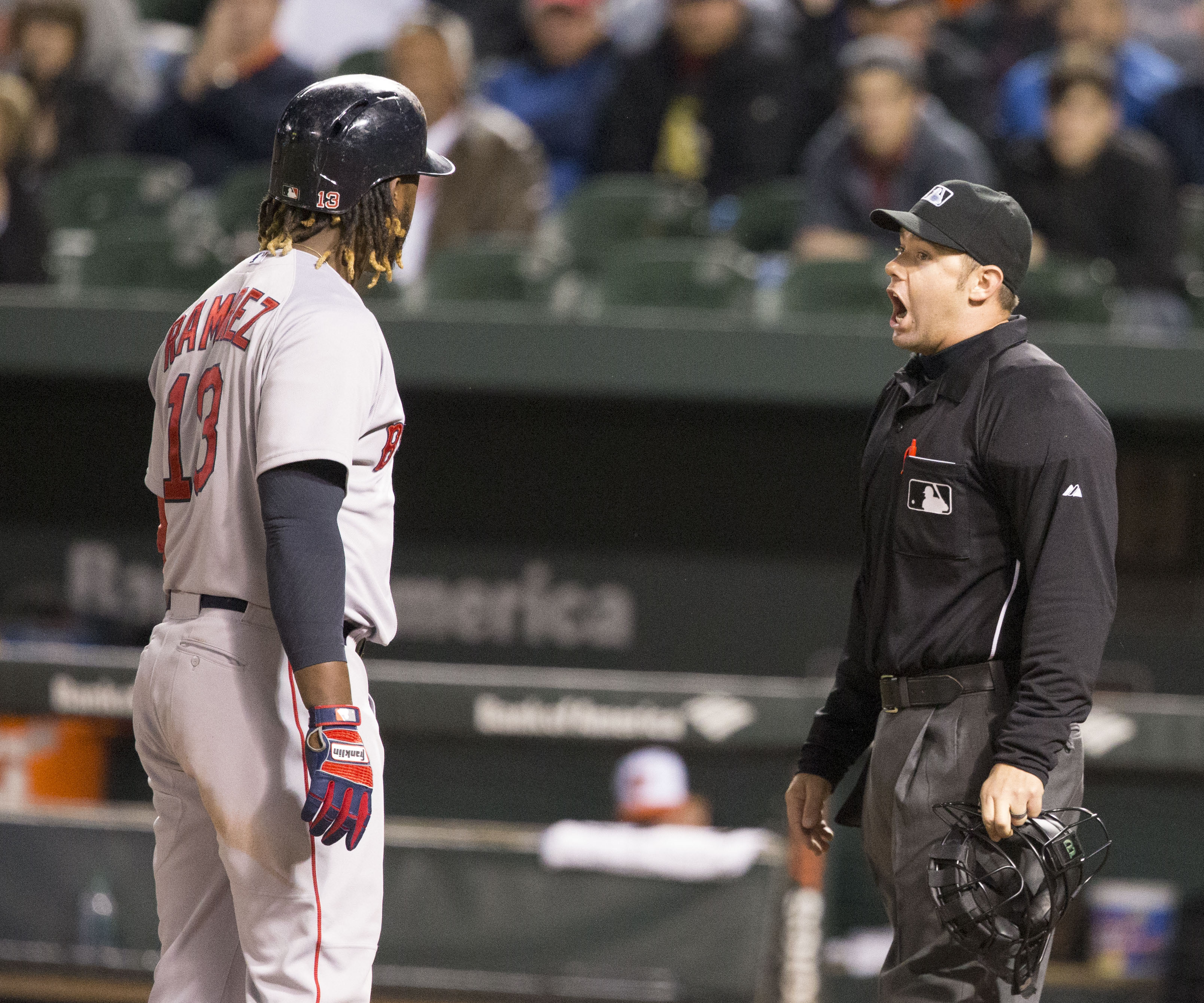
- Little with Hanley Ramírez in 2015

MLB – No. 93
- Umpire
- Born: March 2, 1984 (age 42); Fall Branch, Tennessee, U.S.

MLB debut
- June 24, 2013

Crew information
- Umpiring crew: G
- Crew members: #23 Lance Barksdale (crew chief); #93 Will Little; #67 Ryan Additon; #20 Ryan Wills

Career highlights and awards
- Special Assignments: World Series (2025); League Championship Series (2020); Division Series (2017, 2019, 2021, 2022, 2023, 2025); Wild Card Games (2016, 2018, 2020, 2024); All-Star Games (2022); World Baseball Classic (2017, 2023); MLB Little League Classic (2022); MLB Speedway Classic (2025)

William Max Little III (born March 2, 1984) is an American Major League Baseball umpire. He was promoted to a full-time position in February 2015. He attended Science Hill High School in Johnson City, Tennessee, then studied biology at Milligan College, where he continued playing baseball.

Little worked his first postseason assignment in 2016, working in the 2016 American League Wild Card Game.

Little was the first base umpire when Albert Pujols of the Los Angeles Angels hit his 600th career home run against the Minnesota Twins on June 3, 2017.

For the 2018 regular season he was found to be a Top 10 performing home plate umpire in terms of accuracy in calling balls and strikes. His error rate was 7.66 percent. This was based on a study conducted at Boston University where 372,442 pitches were culled and analyzed.

He wears #93.
