= Jordan Baker (umpire) =

American baseball umpire (born 1981)

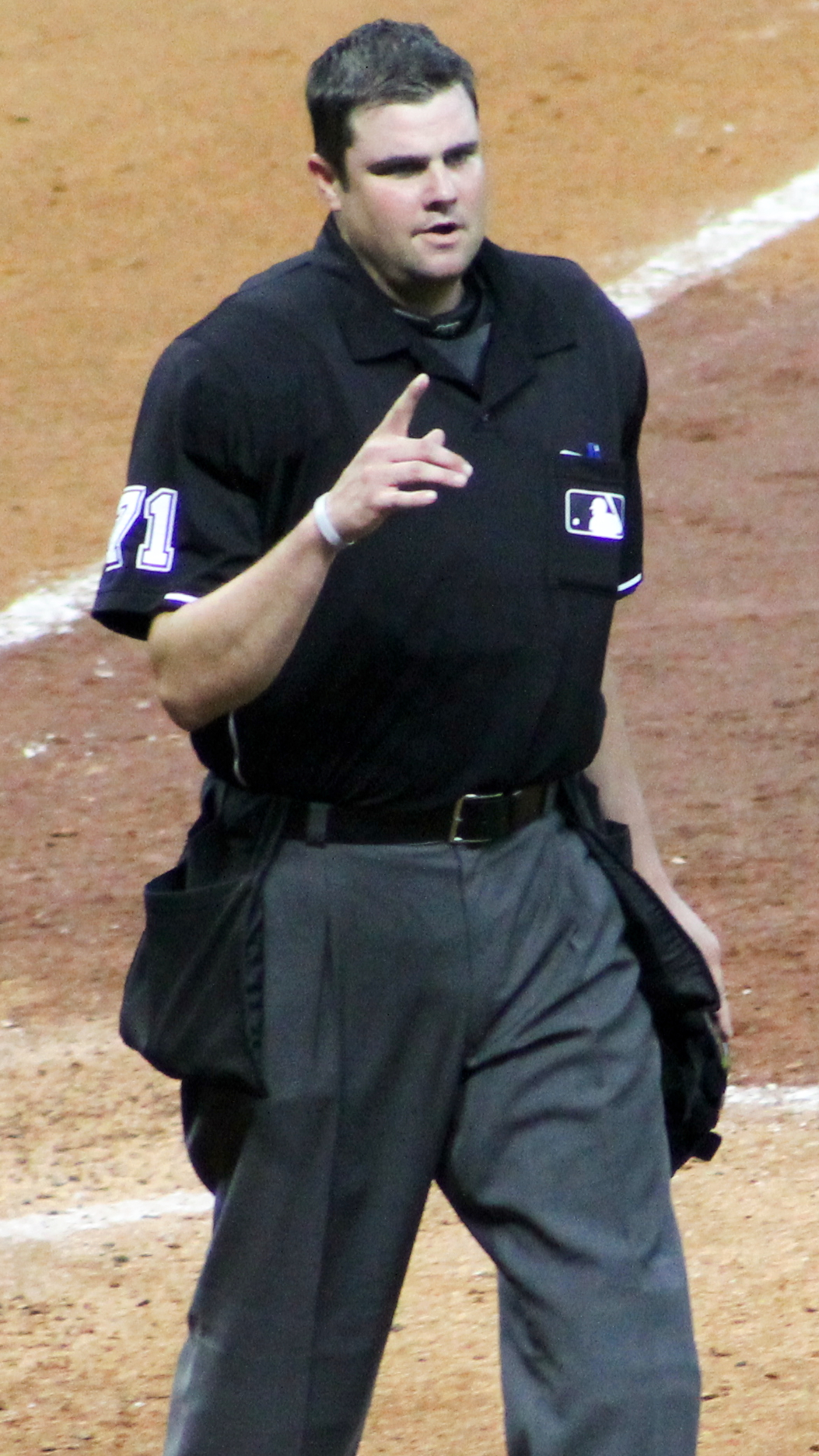
- Baker in 2014

MLB – No. 71
- Umpire
- Born: December 23, 1981 (age 44); Enid, Oklahoma, U.S.

MLB debut
- June 22, 2012

Crew information
- Umpiring crew: S
- Crew members: #71 Jordan Baker (crew chief); #8 Rob Drake; #85 Stu Scheurwater; #25 Junior Valentine

Career highlights and awards
- Special Assignments: World Series (2022, 2025); League Championship Series (2021, 2023, 2024, 2026); Division Series (2019, 2022, 2025); Wild Card Games/Series (2017, 2020, 2021, 2023, 2024, 2026); All-Star Games (2019)

Jordan Christopher Baker (born December 23, 1981) is an American umpire for Major League Baseball.

At 6' 7", Baker is the tallest active MLB umpire. Baker gained attention during the 2013 season for throwing wads of chewed gum onto the outfield grass after each half inning. Some critics described such action as disrespectful to the players and the ground crews.

Baker was the second base umpire on July 30, 2017, when Adrián Beltré of the Texas Rangers got his 3000th career hit against the Baltimore Orioles.

Baker made his first postseason assignment in 2017, appearing in the 2017 National League Wild Card Game.

Baker was the home plate umpire in the Texas Rangers' last game at Globe Life Park.

Baker was the second base umpire when Domingo German threw a perfect game on June 28, 2023, at Oakland Coliseum.

Baker was the home plate umpire during Game 7 of the 2025 World Series.
