= Rob Drake =

American baseball umpire (born 1969)

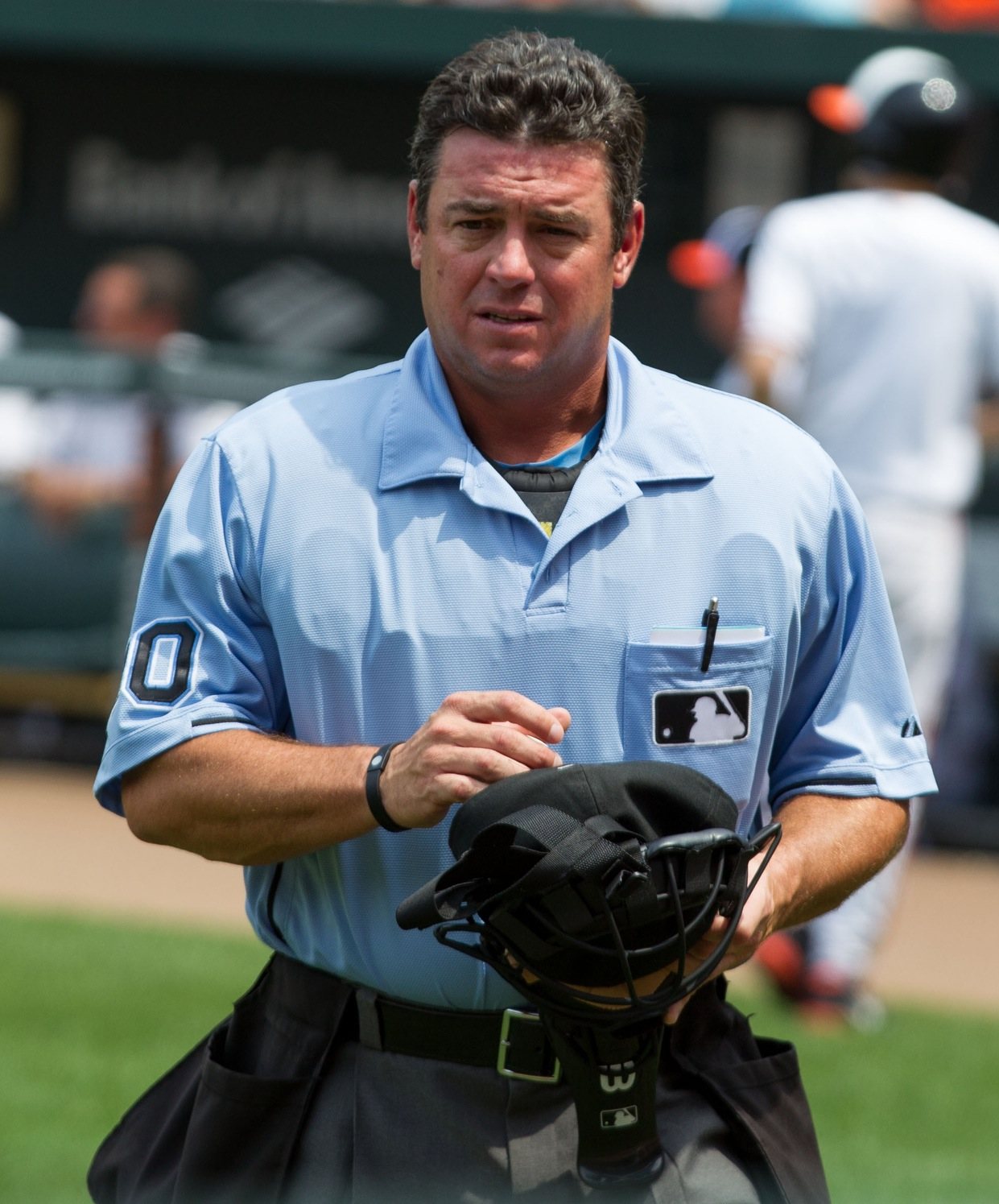
- Drake in 2012

MLB – No. 8
- Umpire
- Born: May 24, 1969 (age 57); Indiana, Pennsylvania, U.S.

MLB debut
- September 3, 1999

Crew information
- Umpiring crew: S
- Crew members: #71 Jordan Baker (crew chief); #8 Rob Drake; #85 Stu Scheurwater; #25 Junior Valentine

Career highlights and awards
- Special assignments: League Championship Series (2012, 2013, 2015, 2021); Division Series (2010, 2014, 2024); Wild Card Games/Series (2012, 2013, 2020, 2026); All-Star Games (2013); World Baseball Classic (2006); MLB Little League Classic (2017; Home plate umpire for Félix Hernández's perfect game (August 15, 2012)

Robert Paul Drake (born May 24, 1969) is an American umpire in Major League Baseball. He was named to the Major League staff in 2010, and wears uniform number 8.

== Umpiring career ==
Drake was born in Indiana, Pennsylvania, and has worked in both Major Leagues since umpiring his first MLB game on September 3, 1999. Drake had previously worked in the Northwest, Midwest, Eastern, California and Pacific Coast leagues before reaching MLB. Drake has also umpired winter baseball in the Dominican Republic, and officiated during the 2006 World Baseball Classic. Drake has worked MLB's All-Star Game (2013), Wild Card Game (2012, 2013, 2020, 2026), Division Series (2010, 2014), and League Championship Series (2012, 2013, 2015, 2021).

Drake ended the 2016 season on the bereavement list for immediate family following the sudden death of his wife Yvonnka on September 10, 2016.

Drake was the third base umpire for Aníbal Sánchez's no-hitter on September 6, 2006. He was also the right field umpire for Roy Halladay's no-hitter in the 2010 NLDS, and was the second base umpire for Francisco Liriano's no-hitter in 2011.

In 2011, Drake ejected St. Louis Cardinals catcher Yadier Molina from a game against the Milwaukee Brewers. During the ensuing argument, Drake appeared to be hit by Molina's spittle. After the game, Molina said, "I would never spit on anybody's face." That comment notwithstanding, Molina was suspended for five games.

Drake was the home plate umpire for Félix Hernández's perfect game against the Tampa Bay Rays on August 15, 2012. Drake ejected Rays manager Joe Maddon in the seventh inning of the game.

He was chosen as one of the umpires for the one-game Wild Card playoff between the Atlanta Braves and the St. Louis Cardinals on October 5, 2012, and advanced to the 2012 ALCS less than two weeks later.

Drake was the home plate umpire for Chris Heston's no-hitter against the New York Mets on June 9, 2015.

Drake was the second base umpire who called the first game-ending triple play in National League history. Eric Bruntlett (Phillies) caught a line drive, and the Mets ran themselves into an unassisted triple play, cementing the Phillies' 9–7 win.

In 2019, Drake tweeted, "I will be buying an AR-15 tomorrow, because if you impeach MY PRESIDENT this way, YOU WILL HAVE ANOTHER CIVAL [sic] WAR!!! #MAGA2020." The tweet was deleted. A follow-up tweet incorrectly claimed that Congress could not begin an impeachment inquiry without a vote. An MLB spokesman said that the league began investigating Drake's tweet. Drake deleted his Twitter account within hours of his tweets being picked up by the media.

== See also ==
- List of Major League Baseball umpires (disambiguation)
