= 2022 Major League Baseball All-Star Game =

2022 American baseball competition

| | 1 | 2 | 3 | 4 | 5 | 6 | 7 | 8 | 9 | R | H | E |
|---|---|---|---|---|---|---|---|---|---|---|---|---|
| American League | 0 | 0 | 0 | 3 | 0 | 0 | 0 | 0 | 0 | 3 | 8 | 1 |
| National League | 2 | 0 | 0 | 0 | 0 | 0 | 0 | 0 | 0 | 2 | 5 | 0 |
- Date: July 19, 2022
- Venue: Dodger Stadium
- City: Los Angeles, California
- Managers: Dusty Baker (HOU); Brian Snitker (ATL)
- MVP: Giancarlo Stanton (NYY)
- Attendance: 52,518
- Ceremonial first pitch: Fernando Valenzuela
- Television: Fox (United States); Fox Deportes; MLB International (International)
- TV announcers: Joe Davis, John Smoltz, Ken Rosenthal and Tom Verducci (Fox); Adrián García Márquez, Edgar González, Carlos Alvarez and Jaime Motta (Fox Deportes); Jason Benetti and Dan Plesac (MLB International)
- Radio: ESPN
- Radio announcers: Jon Sciambi and Doug Glanville

The 2022 Major League Baseball All-Star Game was the 92nd Major League Baseball All-Star Game, held between the American League (AL) and the National League (NL) of Major League Baseball (MLB). The game was hosted by the Los Angeles Dodgers at Dodger Stadium. The game was played on July 19, broadcast nationally by Fox, Fox Deportes, and ESPN Radio.

The American League defeated the National League 3–2, for its ninth straight All-Star Game win.

Coincidentally, the previous time Dodger Stadium hosted the game in 1980, that year's result gave the National League its ninth straight win as well.

== Background ==
=== Host selection ===
The Dodgers were awarded the 2022 MLB All-Star Game after the 2020 contest, which they were originally scheduled to host, was canceled due to the COVID-19 pandemic in the United States. This marked the first time in 42 years (and fourth time overall) that the Dodgers hosted an All-Star Game, the previous occurrences being in 1949 at Ebbets Field in Brooklyn (when the franchise played as the Brooklyn Dodgers), 1959 at Los Angeles Memorial Coliseum, and 1980 at Dodger Stadium.

=== Roster selections ===
The starting rosters for each league's position players plus designated hitter (DH) were determined by fan balloting, which was conducted in two phases. New in 2022, the first-phase top vote-getter for each league automatically received a spot in the starting lineup. The top two vote-getters for every other non-pitching position and DH advanced to the second phase of voting. There are normally six finalists for the three outfield positions in each league, except when an outfielder is the top vote-getter, in which case there are four finalists for the remaining two outfield positions. Voting does not carry over between phases.

First phase voting was held from June 8 through June 30, and second phase voting was held from July 5 through July 8. All voting was conducted online, at MLB.com or via the MLB app. Starting players, as selected via voting, were announced on July 8. Reserve position players and all pitchers—selected "via 'Player Ballot' choices and selections made by the Commissioner’s Office"—were announced on July 10. The final roster size of each team was planned to be 32 players.

==== All-Star legacy selections ====
MLB announced on July 8 that Albert Pujols and Miguel Cabrera had been added as the 33rd player for the NL and AL, respectively, in celebration of their career achievements. This was the 11th All-Star selection for Pujols and the 12th for Cabrera.

=== Logo and uniforms ===
The 2020 All-Star Game logo was shaped after the hexagonal DodgerVision video boards at Dodger Stadium, with gold-trimmed Art Deco lettering as a nod to Hollywood. After MLB reassigned the Dodgers the 2022 game as compensation for the 2020 cancellation, the only change to the logo was the date. Uniforms for the American League were in dark gray, while uniforms for the National League were in white. Team logos and letters were in gold with black trim. Caps were black featuring each team's logo in gold and black embellishments, along with a gold star.

== Rosters ==
=== American League ===
Elected starters
| Position | Player | Team | All-Star Games |
|---|---|---|---|
| C | Alejandro Kirk | Blue Jays | 1 |
| 1B | Vladimir Guerrero Jr. | Blue Jays | 2 |
| 2B | Jose Altuve^{#} | Astros | 8 |
| 3B | Rafael Devers | Red Sox | 2 |
| SS | Tim Anderson | White Sox | 2 |
| OF | Aaron Judge† | Yankees | 4 |
| OF | Giancarlo Stanton | Yankees | 5 |
| OF | Mike Trout^{#} | Angels | 10 |
| DH | Shohei Ohtani | Angels | 2 |

Reserves
| Position | Player | Team | All-Star Games |
|---|---|---|---|
| C | Jose Trevino | Yankees | 1 |
| 1B | Luis Arráez | Twins | 1 |
| 1B | Ty France^{[P]} | Mariners | 1 |
| 2B | Santiago Espinal^{[H]} | Blue Jays | 1 |
| 2B | Andrés Giménez^{[G]} | Guardians | 1 |
| 3B | José Ramírez | Guardians | 4 |
| SS | Xander Bogaerts | Red Sox | 4 |
| SS | Corey Seager^{[E]} | Rangers | 3 |
| OF | Andrew Benintendi | Royals | 1 |
| OF | Byron Buxton^{[O]} | Twins | 1 |
| OF | Julio Rodríguez | Mariners | 1 |
| OF | George Springer^{#} | Blue Jays | 4 |
| OF | Kyle Tucker | Astros | 1 |
| DH | Yordan Alvarez^{#} | Astros | 1 |
| DH | J. D. Martinez^{[A]} | Red Sox | 5 |
| DH | Miguel Cabrera‡ | Tigers | 12 |

Pitchers
| Player | Team | All-Star Games |
|---|---|---|
| Paul Blackburn | Athletics | 1 |
| Emmanuel Clase | Guardians | 1 |
| Gerrit Cole^{#} | Yankees | 5 |
| Nestor Cortés Jr. | Yankees | 1 |
| Liam Hendriks^{[L]} | White Sox | 3 |
| Clay Holmes | Yankees | 1 |
| Jorge López | Orioles | 1 |
| Alek Manoah | Blue Jays | 1 |
| Shane McClanahan | Rays | 1 |
| Shohei Ohtani | Angels | 2 |
| Martín Pérez | Rangers | 1 |
| Jordan Romano^{[M]} | Blue Jays | 1 |
| Gregory Soto | Tigers | 2 |
| Framber Valdez | Astros | 1 |
| Justin Verlander^{#} | Astros | 9 |

=== National League ===
Elected starters
| Position | Player | Team | All-Star Games |
|---|---|---|---|
| C | Willson Contreras | Cubs | 3 |
| 1B | Paul Goldschmidt | Cardinals | 7 |
| 2B | Jazz Chisholm Jr.^{#} | Marlins | 1 |
| 3B | Manny Machado | Padres | 6 |
| SS | Trea Turner | Dodgers | 2 |
| OF | Ronald Acuña Jr.† | Braves | 3 |
| OF | Mookie Betts | Dodgers | 6 |
| OF | Joc Pederson | Giants | 2 |
| DH | Bryce Harper^{#} | Phillies | 7 |

Reserves
| Position | Player | Team | All-Star Games |
|---|---|---|---|
| C | William Contreras^{[C]} | Braves | 1 |
| C | Travis d'Arnaud | Braves | 1 |
| 1B | Pete Alonso | Mets | 2 |
| 1B | Freddie Freeman^{[R]} | Dodgers | 6 |
| 1B | C. J. Cron | Rockies | 1 |
| 2B | Jake Cronenworth^{[K]} | Padres | 2 |
| 2B | Jeff McNeil^{[J]} | Mets | 2 |
| 3B | Nolan Arenado^{#} | Cardinals | 7 |
| 3B | Austin Riley^{[F]} | Braves | 1 |
| SS | Dansby Swanson | Braves | 1 |
| OF | Ian Happ | Cubs | 1 |
| OF | Starling Marte^{#} | Mets | 2 |
| OF | Kyle Schwarber | Phillies | 2 |
| OF | Juan Soto | Nationals | 2 |
| DH | Garrett Cooper^{[D]} | Marlins | 1 |
| DH | Albert Pujols‡ | Cardinals | 11 |

Pitchers
| Player | Team | All-Star Games |
|---|---|---|
| Sandy Alcántara | Marlins | 2 |
| Tyler Anderson^{[I]} | Dodgers | 1 |
| David Bednar | Pirates | 1 |
| Corbin Burnes^{#} | Brewers | 2 |
| Luis Castillo | Reds | 2 |
| Edwin Díaz | Mets | 2 |
| Max Fried^{#} | Braves | 1 |
| Tony Gonsolin | Dodgers | 1 |
| Josh Hader^{#} | Brewers | 4 |
| Ryan Helsley | Cardinals | 1 |
| Clayton Kershaw | Dodgers | 9 |
| Joe Mantiply | Diamondbacks | 1 |
| Miles Mikolas^{[Q]} | Cardinals | 2 |
| Joe Musgrove | Padres | 1 |
| Carlos Rodón^{[B]}^{#} | Giants | 2 |
| Devin Williams^{[N]} | Brewers | 1 |

† Denotes top vote-getter in each league
‡ Denotes player was an All-Star legacy selection.

==== Roster notes ====
1. J.D. Martinez was named as the roster replacement for Yordan Alvarez due to injury.
2. Carlos Rodón was named as the roster replacement for Josh Hader due to Hader dealing with a personal matter.
3. William Contreras was named starter in place of Bryce Harper due to injury.
4. Garrett Cooper was named as the roster replacement for Bryce Harper due to injury.
5. Corey Seager was named as the roster replacement for George Springer due to injury.
6. Austin Riley was named as the roster replacement for Nolan Arenado due to injury
7. Andrés Giménez was named starter in place of Jose Altuve due to injury.
8. Santiago Espinal was named as the roster replacement for Jose Altuve due to injury.
9. Tyler Anderson was named as the roster replacement for Carlos Rodón due to injury.
10. Jeff McNeil was named starter in place of Jazz Chisholm Jr. due to injury
11. Jake Cronenworth was named as the roster replacement for Jazz Chisholm Jr. due to injury
12. Liam Hendriks was named as the roster replacement for Justin Verlander due to Verlander starting on Saturday
13. Jordan Romano was named as the roster replacement for Gerrit Cole due to Cole starting on Sunday
14. Devin Williams was named as the roster replacement for Max Fried due to Fried starting on Saturday
15. Byron Buxton was named starter in place of Mike Trout due to injury
16. Ty France was named as the roster replacement for Mike Trout due to injury
17. Miles Mikolas was named as the roster replacement for Corbin Burnes due to Burnes opting not to play
18. Freddie Freeman was named as the roster replacement for Starling Marte due to injury

#: Indicates player would not play (replaced as per reference notes above).

== Game summary ==
=== Starting lineup ===
American League
| Order | Player | Team | Position |
|---|---|---|---|
| 1 | Shohei Ohtani | Angels | DH |
| 2 | Aaron Judge | Yankees | RF |
| 3 | Rafael Devers | Red Sox | 3B |
| 4 | Vladimir Guerrero Jr. | Blue Jays | 1B |
| 5 | Giancarlo Stanton | Yankees | LF |
| 6 | Byron Buxton | Twins | CF |
| 7 | Tim Anderson | White Sox | SS |
| 8 | Andrés Giménez | Guardians | 2B |
| 9 | Alejandro Kirk | Blue Jays | C |
| | Shane McClanahan | Rays | P |

National League
| Order | Player | Team | Position |
|---|---|---|---|
| 1 | Ronald Acuña Jr. | Braves | RF |
| 2 | Mookie Betts | Dodgers | CF |
| 3 | Manny Machado | Padres | 3B |
| 4 | Paul Goldschmidt | Cardinals | 1B |
| 5 | Trea Turner | Dodgers | SS |
| 6 | Willson Contreras | Cubs | C |
| 7 | William Contreras | Braves | DH |
| 8 | Joc Pederson | Giants | LF |
| 9 | Jeff McNeil | Mets | 2B |
| | Clayton Kershaw | Dodgers | P |

=== Line score ===
July 19, 2022 5:20 pm (PDT) Dodger Stadium in Los Angeles, California, 84 °F (29 °C), clear
| Team | 1 | 2 | 3 | 4 | 5 | 6 | 7 | 8 | 9 | R | H | E |
|---|---|---|---|---|---|---|---|---|---|---|---|---|
| American League | 0 | 0 | 0 | 3 | 0 | 0 | 0 | 0 | 0 | 3 | 8 | 1 |
| National League | 2 | 0 | 0 | 0 | 0 | 0 | 0 | 0 | 0 | 2 | 5 | 0 |
Starting pitchers: AL: Shane McClanahan; NL: Clayton Kershaw; WP: Framber Valdez (1–0) LP: Tony Gonsolin (0–1) Sv: Emmanuel Clase (1); Home runs: AL: Giancarlo Stanton, Byron Buxton (1); NL: Paul Goldschmidt (1); Attendance: 52,518 Time: 3:11; Umpires: HP – Bill Miller; 1B – Lance Barksdale; 2B – Mark Ripperger; 3B – Will Little; LF – Gabe Morales; RF – Carlos Torres; Replay Official – Brian Knight; Boxscore

== National anthems ==
The Canadian national anthem was sung in English and French by actress and singer Melissa O'Neil, accompanied by organist Dieter Ruehle. The American national anthem was sung by singer-songwriter, actor, and Los Angeles native Ben Platt.

== See also ==
- List of Major League Baseball All-Star Games
- Major League Baseball All-Star Game Most Valuable Player Award
- All-Star Futures Game
- Home Run Derby
