= 2024 American League Wild Card Series =

Teams
Team (Wins)		Manager	Season
Detroit Tigers (2)		A. J. Hinch	86–76 (.531), GB: 6 1/2
Houston Astros (0)		Joe Espada	88–73 (.547), GA: 3 1/2
- Dates: October 1–2
- Television: ABC
- TV announcers: Michael Kay, Todd Frazier, Tim Kurkjian, and Alden González
- Radio: ESPN
- Radio announcers: Dave O'Brien and Will Middlebrooks
- Umpires: Jordan Baker, Will Little, Alfonso Márquez (crew chief), Tony Randazzo, Jeremie Rehak, Junior Valentine

Teams
Team (Wins)		Manager	Season
Kansas City Royals (2)		Matt Quatraro	86–76 (.531), GB: 6 1/2
Baltimore Orioles (0)		Brandon Hyde	91–71 (.562), GB: 3
- Dates: October 1–2
- Television: ESPN2 (Game 1); ESPN (Game 2)
- TV announcers: Sean McDonough, Jessica Mendoza, Ben McDonald, and Jeff Passan
- Radio: ESPN
- Radio announcers: Mike Monaco and Rubén Amaro Jr.
- Umpires: Ryan Additon, Nic Lentz, Ben May, Bill Miller (crew chief), Malachi Moore, David Rackley

The 2024 American League Wild Card Series (branded as the Wild Card Series presented by T-Mobile 5G Home Internet for sponsorship reasons) were the two best-of-three playoff series in Major League Baseball's (MLB) 2024 postseason that determined the participating teams of the 2024 American League Division Series (ALDS). Matching with the NL Wild Card, both matchups began on October 1, with Game 2s on October 2. ESPN broadcast both Wild Card Series in the United States together with ESPN Radio.

These matchups were:

- (3) Houston Astros (AL West champions) vs. (6) Detroit Tigers (third wild card): Tigers won the series, 2–0.
- (4) Baltimore Orioles (first wild card) vs. (5) Kansas City Royals (second wild card): Royals won the series, 2–0.

== Background ==
The lowest-seeded division winner and three wild card teams in each league play in a best-of-three series after the end of the regular season. The winners of each league's wild card rounds advance to face the two best division winners in that league's Division Series.

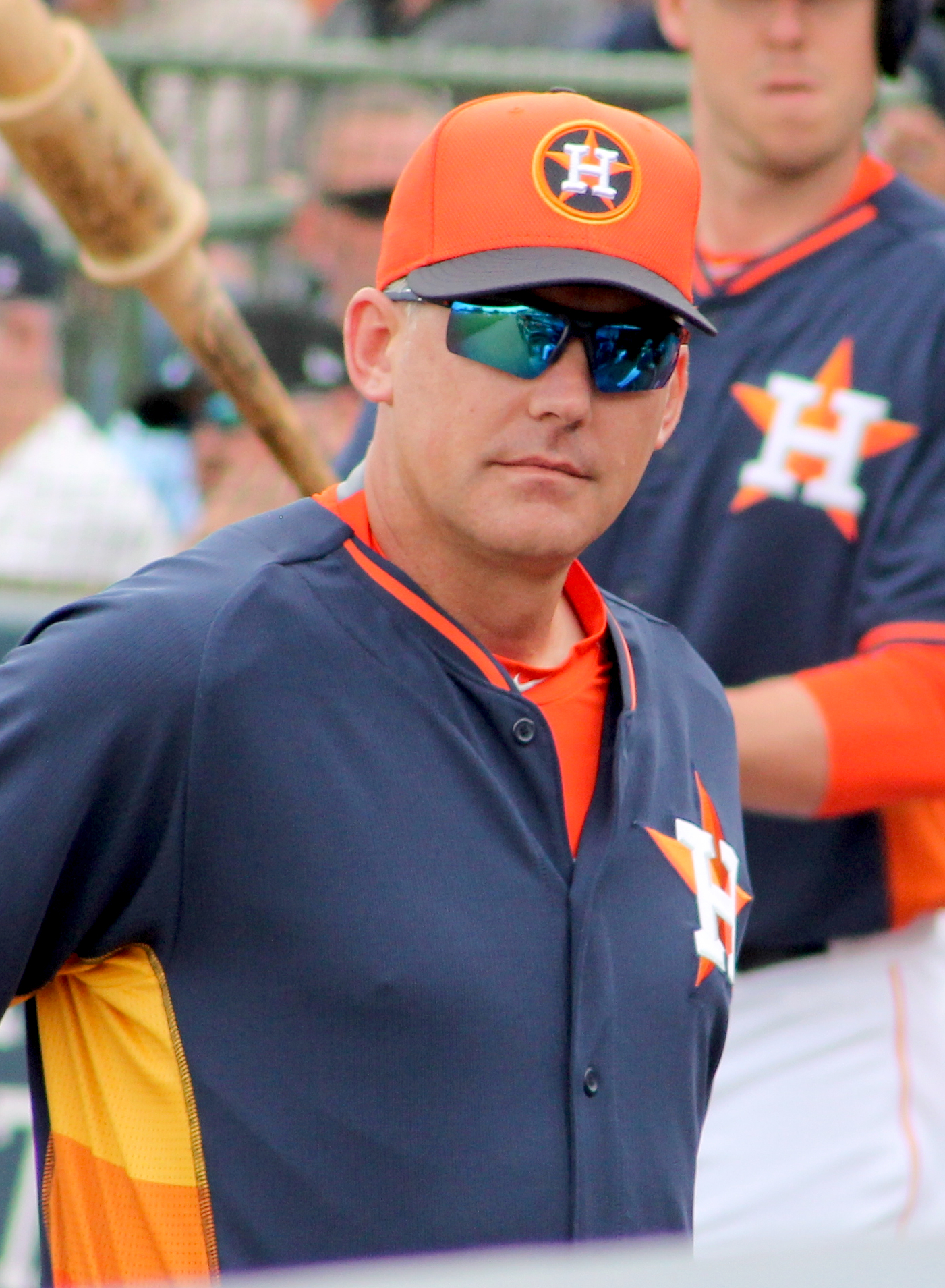
Tigers manager A.J. Hinch (pictured in 2015 with the Astros)

The Houston Astros (88–73) qualified for the postseason as the American League West division winner, clinching the division by beating the Seattle Mariners on September 24. As the team with the lowest record among other division winners in the American League for this season, they were locked into the third seed following the Cleveland Guardians' win over the Cincinnati Reds on September 24, which resulted in the Guardians clinching a first-round bye. With the postseason berth, the Astros extended their streak of appearances to eight seasons, the fourth longest in MLB history. They hosted the Detroit Tigers (86–76), who clinched a postseason berth on September 27 with a victory against the Chicago White Sox. The Tigers, who held just a 0.2% chance of a postseason berth on August 2 when they were 9 1/2 games back from a wild card spot, made their first postseason appearance since 2014, ending the longest current postseason drought they had shared with the Los Angeles Angels. The Astros won both series against the Tigers during the regular season, with both meetings taking place in May and June, when both teams were under .500. Five years earlier, Tigers' manager A.J. Hinch — then manager of the Houston Astros — lost in the 2019 World Series. Hinch was fired by the Astros less than three months later, and was issued a one-season suspension by MLB for his role in the sign-stealing scandal that took place in 2017, the year the Astros won the World Series. This was the first postseason meeting between the Astros and the Tigers.

The Baltimore Orioles (91–71) qualified for the postseason with a victory on September 24. They were locked into the Wild Card spot with a loss to the New York Yankees on September 26, ending their division title aspirations, and clinched the fourth seed the next night by beating the Minnesota Twins. This is Baltimore's second straight postseason berth. They hosted the Kansas City Royals (86–76), who qualified for the postseason with the Minnesota Twins loss on September 27 to the Baltimore Orioles, thus eliminating Minnesota from postseason contention. The Royals are playing in their first postseason since they won the World Series back in 2015 and are just the third team to make the postseason after losing 100+ games the previous year. The Orioles won the season series against the Royals, winning both series in April. This is the second postseason meeting between the Baltimore Orioles and the Kansas City Royals. Their only previous postseason meeting came in the 2014 American League Championship Series, which saw Kansas City sweep Baltimore to advance to their first World Series in 29 years. This was the second postseason match-up between the two cities this year, following the AFC Championship Game between the Kansas City Chiefs and Baltimore Ravens in January.

As the top two seeds, the New York Yankees (94–68) and Cleveland Guardians (92–69) earned a first-round bye and home-field advantage in the ALDS. This was the first year since 2014 that no team in Major League Baseball won 100 games or more in the regular season.

== Matchups ==
=== Houston Astros vs. Detroit Tigers ===
Detroit won the series, 2–0.

Game	Date	Score	Location	Time	Attendance
1	October 1	Detroit Tigers – 3, Houston Astros – 1	Minute Maid Park	3:01	40,617
2	October 2	Detroit Tigers – 5, Houston Astros – 2	Minute Maid Park	2:55	40,824

=== Baltimore Orioles vs. Kansas City Royals ===
Kansas City won the series, 2–0.

Game	Date	Score	Location	Time	Attendance
1	October 1	Kansas City Royals – 1, Baltimore Orioles – 0	Oriole Park at Camden Yards	2:25	41,506
2	October 2	Kansas City Royals – 2, Baltimore Orioles – 1	Oriole Park at Camden Yards	3:01	38,698

== Houston vs. Detroit ==
This was the first postseason meeting between the Houston Astros and Detroit Tigers.

=== Game 1 ===
October 1, 2024 1:32 pm (CDT) at Minute Maid Park in Houston, Texas 73 °F (23 °C), Roof Closed
Team	1	2	3	4	5	6	7	8	9	R	H	E
Detroit	0	3	0	0	0	0	0	0	0	3	10	0
Houston	0	0	0	0	0	0	0	0	1	1	7	0
WP: Tarik Skubal (1–0) LP: Framber Valdez (0–1) Sv: Beau Brieske (1); Attendance: 40,617; Boxscore

In the top of the second, Jake Rogers had an RBI single off Framber Valdez to give the Tigers the early lead, and then an RBI single by Trey Sweeney extended their lead to 2–0. Matt Vierling's single gave the Tigers a 3–0 advantage. Tarik Skubal, who won the pitching Triple Crown, threw six scoreless innings and struck out six to earn his first playoff pitching win in his career. The Tigers carried a shutout into the ninth inning when Yainer Díaz hit an RBI single in the bottom of the ninth to score pinch runner Zach Dezenzo as the Astros' only run in the game. With the bases loaded and two outs for the Astros, Beau Brieske got Jason Heyward to lineout to Spencer Torkelson for the final out of the game. With this loss, the Astros have lost six consecutive home games in the playoffs since they last won their home playoff game in Game 1 of last year's ALDS. For the Astros, the loss ended a ten-game home winning streak in postseason opening games dating back to the 2004 NLDS, while the Tigers' victory was their first in a playoff game since Game 4 of the 2013 ALCS.

=== Game 2 ===
October 2, 2024 1:32 pm (CDT) at Minute Maid Park in Houston, Texas 73 °F (23 °C), Roof Closed
Team	1	2	3	4	5	6	7	8	9	R	H	E
Detroit	0	0	0	0	0	1	0	4	0	5	7	0
Houston	0	0	0	0	0	0	2	0	0	2	5	1
WP: Sean Guenther (1–0) LP: Ryan Pressly (0–1) Sv: Will Vest (1); Home runs: DET: Parker Meadows (1); HOU: None; Attendance: 40,824; Boxscore

Game 2 was a scoreless affair until the top of the sixth when Parker Meadows hit a solo home run off of Astros starter Hunter Brown. With that home run, Brown's time on the mound ended after going 5 2/3 innings allowing two hits and one run and striking out nine batters. In the bottom of the seventh, Victor Caratini tied the game on a fielder's choice by Jon Singleton and a throwing error by Spencer Torkelson. Jose Altuve's sacrifice fly scored Jeremy Peña and gave the Astros a 2–1 lead. In the top of the eighth, the Tigers tied the game on Ryan Pressly's wild pitch that scored Kerry Carpenter. With the bases loaded, pinch hitter Andy Ibáñez cleared the bases with a double off of Astros' closer Josh Hader, giving the Tigers a three-run lead at 5–2. Will Vest closed out the Astros with a 1-2-3 inning in the bottom of the ninth to seal the series for the Tigers to advance to the ALDS for the first time since 2014. With the Tigers' victory, they ended the Astros' streak of consecutive ALCS appearances at seven from 2017 to 2023. This continued the Astros streak of their season either ending at home in defeat (2018, 2019, 2021, 2023, 2024) or it ending in a World Series win (2017 and 2022), with 2020 being the lone season where Astros season ended on the road (or typically, at a neutral site due to the COVID-19 pandemic).

Detroit became the fourth team in major league history to win a playoff series after having been 10+ games back of a postseason berth at least 110 games into the regular season, joining the 1964 Cardinals, 1969 Mets, and 2011 Cardinals, as well as the third team of the post-1961 expansion era to win a playoff series while having one or fewer players (in this case, Matt Vierling) with previous postseason experience, the others being the 1969 Mets and 2002 Angels.

=== Composite line score ===
2024 ALWC (2–0): Detroit Tigers beat Houston Astros

Team	1	2	3	4	5	6	7	8	9	R	H	E
Detroit Tigers	0	3	0	0	0	1	0	4	0	8	17	0
Houston Astros	0	0	0	0	0	0	2	0	1	3	12	1
Total attendance: 81,441 Average attendance: 40,720

== Baltimore vs. Kansas City ==
This was the second meeting between the Baltimore Orioles and the Kansas City Royals in the postseason, with the last being in the 2014 American League Championship Series, in which Kansas City swept.

=== Game 1 ===
October 1, 2024 4:08 pm (EDT) at Oriole Park at Camden Yards in Baltimore, Maryland 66 °F (19 °C), Overcast
Team	1	2	3	4	5	6	7	8	9	R	H	E
Kansas City	0	0	0	0	0	1	0	0	0	1	5	0
Baltimore	0	0	0	0	0	0	0	0	0	0	5	0
WP: Cole Ragans (1–0) LP: Corbin Burnes (0–1) Sv: Lucas Erceg (1); Attendance: 41,506; Boxscore

In the top of the sixth, Bobby Witt Jr. delivered an RBI single off Corbin Burnes to score Maikel García, giving the Royals a 1–0 lead. That would be enough for the Royals, who were playing in their first postseason game since Game 5 of their World Series-clinching victory in 2015. Cole Ragans threw six scoreless innings and struck out eight to earn his first playoff pitching win in his career. The Orioles left seven batters on base and Lucas Erceg got the save by striking out two.

=== Game 2 ===
October 2, 2024 4:38 pm (EDT) at Oriole Park at Camden Yards in Baltimore, Maryland 69 °F (21 °C), Cloudy
Team	1	2	3	4	5	6	7	8	9	R	H	E
Kansas City	1	0	0	0	0	1	0	0	0	2	9	1
Baltimore	0	0	0	0	1	0	0	0	0	1	6	0
WP: Ángel Zerpa (1–0) LP: Cionel Pérez (0–1) Sv: Lucas Erceg (2); Home runs: KC: None; BAL: Cedric Mullins (1); Attendance: 38,698; Boxscore

Vinnie Pasquantino hit an RBI single off Zach Eflin in the top of the first inning to give the Royals the early lead. The Orioles tied the game in the bottom of the fifth when Cedric Mullins hit a solo home run off Seth Lugo, which turned out to be their only run in this series. In the top of the sixth, Bobby Witt Jr. hit an RBI single to score Kyle Isbel for the Royals to retake the lead 2–1. Lucas Erceg pitched a perfect bottom of the ninth to seal the series for the Royals, sending them to the ALDS for the first time since 2015 and giving them their first postseason series victory since the 2015 World Series. With the loss, the Orioles extended their postseason game losing streak to a league-leading ten games dating back to the 2014 ALCS.

=== Composite line score ===
2024 ALWC (2–0): Kansas City Royals beat Baltimore Orioles

Team	1	2	3	4	5	6	7	8	9	R	H	E
Kansas City Royals	1	0	0	0	0	2	0	0	0	3	14	1
Baltimore Orioles	0	0	0	0	1	0	0	0	0	1	11	0
Total attendance: 80,204 Average attendance: 40,102

== See also ==
- 2024 National League Wild Card Series
