= Austin Riley =

American baseball player (born 1997)

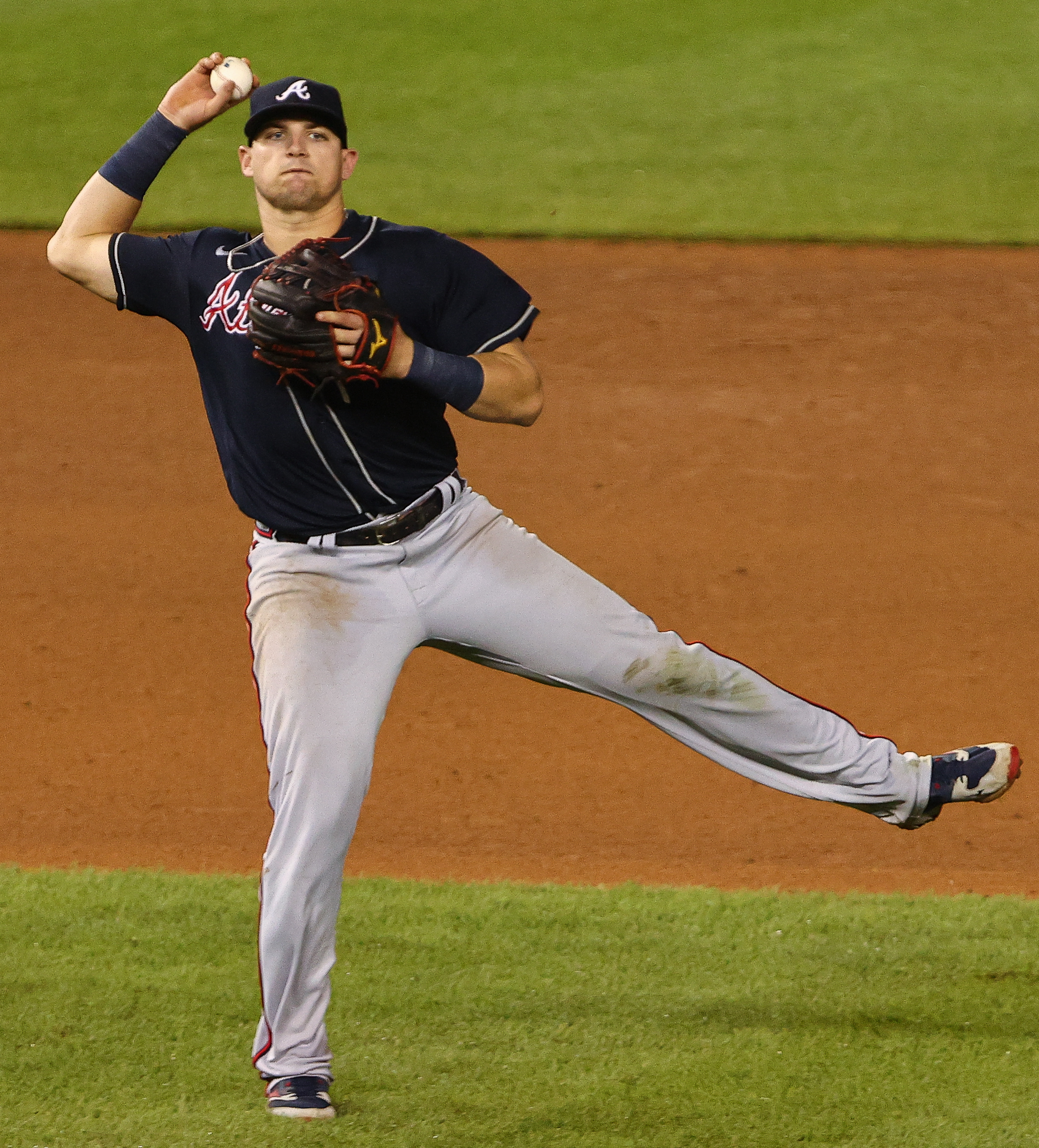
- Riley with the Atlanta Braves in 2020

Atlanta Braves – No. 27
- Third baseman
- Born: April 2, 1997 (age 29); Memphis, Tennessee, U.S.
- Bats: Right Throws: Right

MLB debut
- May 15, 2019, for the Atlanta Braves

MLB statistics (through 2026 season)
- Batting average: .263
- Home runs: 188
- Runs batted in: 555
- Stats at Baseball Reference

Teams
- Atlanta Braves (2019–present)

Career highlights and awards
- 2× All-Star (2022, 2023); World Series champion (2021); 2× All-MLB First Team (2021, 2023); 2× Silver Slugger Award (2021, 2023)

Michael Austin Riley (born April 2, 1997) is an American professional baseball third baseman for the Atlanta Braves of Major League Baseball (MLB). The Braves selected him in the first round, 41st overall, of the 2015 MLB draft.

A star pitcher and third baseman in high school, Riley originally committed to play college baseball at Mississippi State University, before being drafted by the Braves and opting to forgo a college baseball career. Riley made his minor league debut in 2015 with the Gulf Coast Braves and would spend the next several seasons in the Braves farm system.

Riley made his MLB debut with the Braves in 2019. He would soon emerge as a star, winning a Silver Slugger Award in 2021, as well as that year's World Series. Following a strong start to the 2022 season, Riley signed a franchise-record ten-year contract extension worth $212 million. Since 2022, Riley has made two All-Star appearances, two All-MLB First Team appearances, and won two Silver Sluggers.

== Early life ==
Austin Riley is the eldest son of Mike and Elisa Riley. Riley attended DeSoto Central High School in Southaven, Mississippi, where he played baseball as a shortstop and pitcher. Riley played American football as a quarterback during his freshman and sophomore years in high school. Though he expressed a desire to quit football and focus on baseball, the football coach chose to retain Riley as a punter, a position his father had played at Mississippi State University. Riley was committed to play for the Mississippi State Bulldogs baseball team until he was drafted by the Atlanta Braves in 2015. MSU had also offered Riley the chance to play football for the Bulldogs as a punter.

== Career ==
=== Draft and minor leagues ===
The Atlanta Braves selected Riley in the first round, with the 41st overall selection, in the 2015 MLB draft. Though he was committed to the Mississippi State Bulldogs baseball team, Riley chose to sign with the Braves for $1.6 million. Riley made his professional debut with the Gulf Coast Braves that season. After 30 games, he was promoted to the Danville Braves in the Appalachian League. Overall in 60 games he batted .304/.389/.544 with 12 home runs over 217 at-bats, while on defense he committed 16 errors for a .908 fielding percentage.

In 2016, Riley played for the Rome Braves of the Class A South Atlantic League. he batted .271/.324/.479. On defense, he committed 30 errors at third base.

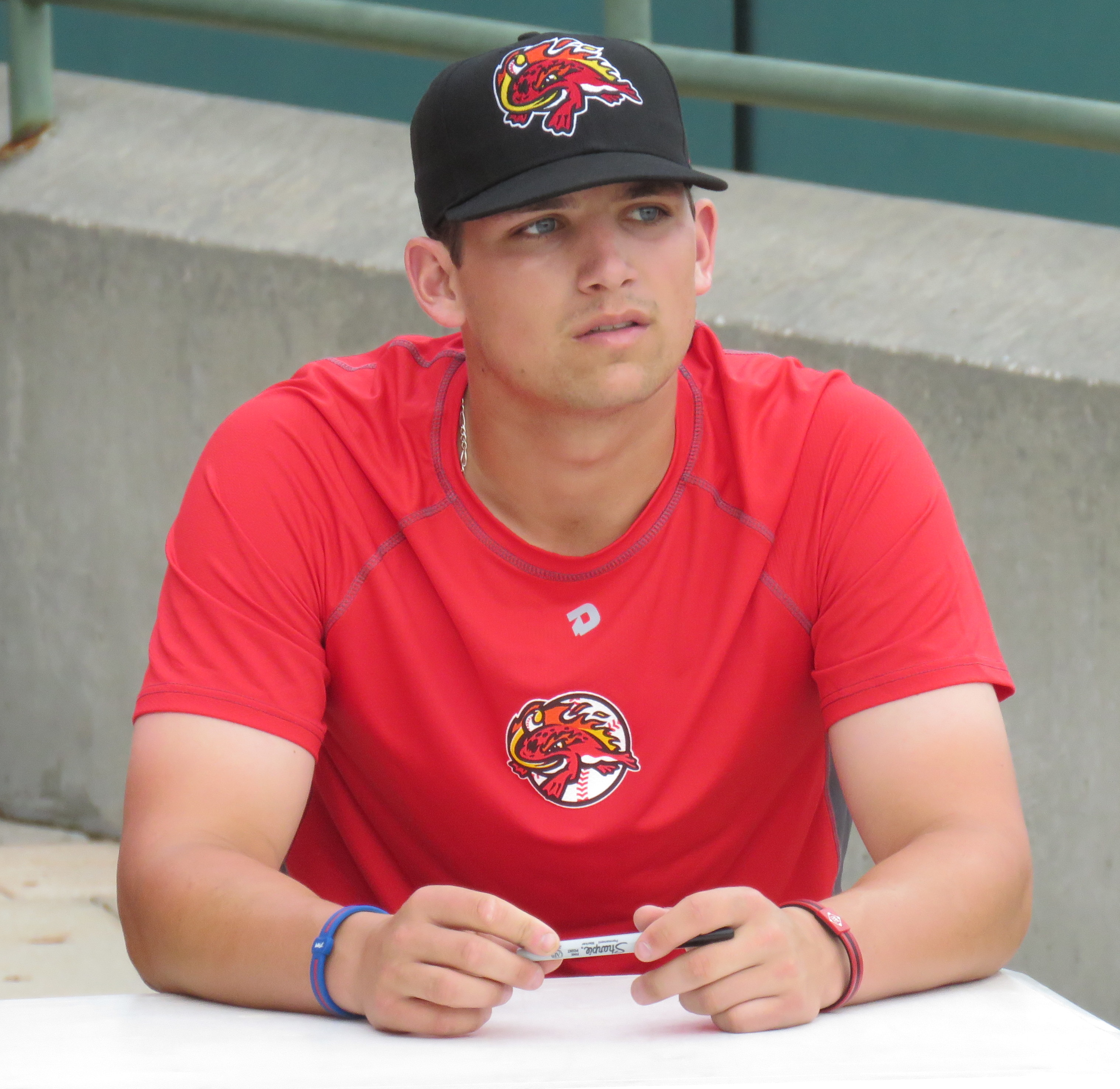
Riley with the Fire Frogs in 2017

The Braves invited Riley to spring training as a non-roster player in 2017. He began the 2017 season with the Florida Fire Frogs of the Class A-Advanced Florida State League. He was promoted to the Mississippi Braves of the Double-A Southern League in July. In 129 games between Florida and Mississippi, Riley hit .275/.339/.446 with 20 home runs and 74 RBIs, while on defense he committed 20 errors at third base. He played for the Peoria Javelinas of the Arizona Fall League at the end of the minor league season.

Prior to the 2018 season, Riley received an invitation to spring training. He was ranked among the top 100 prospects before the 2018 season. He began 2018 with Mississippi, and after batting .333 with six home runs and 20 RBIs in 27 games, and was promoted to the Gwinnett Stripers in May. In 75 games with Gwinnett, he hit .282/.346/.464/.810 with 12 home runs and 47 RBI. He opened the 2019 season with Gwinnett. He was now a consensus top 40 prospect.

=== Atlanta Braves ===
On May 15, 2019, Riley was called up to the Atlanta Braves prior to their game against the St. Louis Cardinals. Riley was promoted after Ender Inciarte was placed on the injured list. Riley made his major league debut that night and, in his second at bat, hit a home run off Michael Wacha. On May 29, Riley hit his first career grand slam, driving in the only runs in a 14–4 blowout loss to the Nationals, marking his seventh home run in fourteen career games and bringing his RBI total to 20. At the time, his seven home runs in 14 games were the second-most to begin a career, trailing only Trevor Story. (Aristides Aquino has since passed them both with nine home runs.) On June 1, Riley hit his eighth home run in 16 games, becoming the fourth player in major league baseball history to achieve this feat. He was also the fastest player in Braves franchise history to do so. Riley earned the NL Rookie of the Month Award for May, despite only playing in 15 games.

On August 8, Riley was placed on the 10-day injured list due to a right knee sprain, retroactive to August 5. It was later revealed that Riley had a partial tear in his lateral collateral ligament that he sustained while working out. Riley began a rehab assignment on August 22 with the Rome Braves, and as of September 1 was continuing to rehab with the Gwinnett Stripers. He returned to the Braves lineup on September 6, playing in 14 of the team's final 21 games.

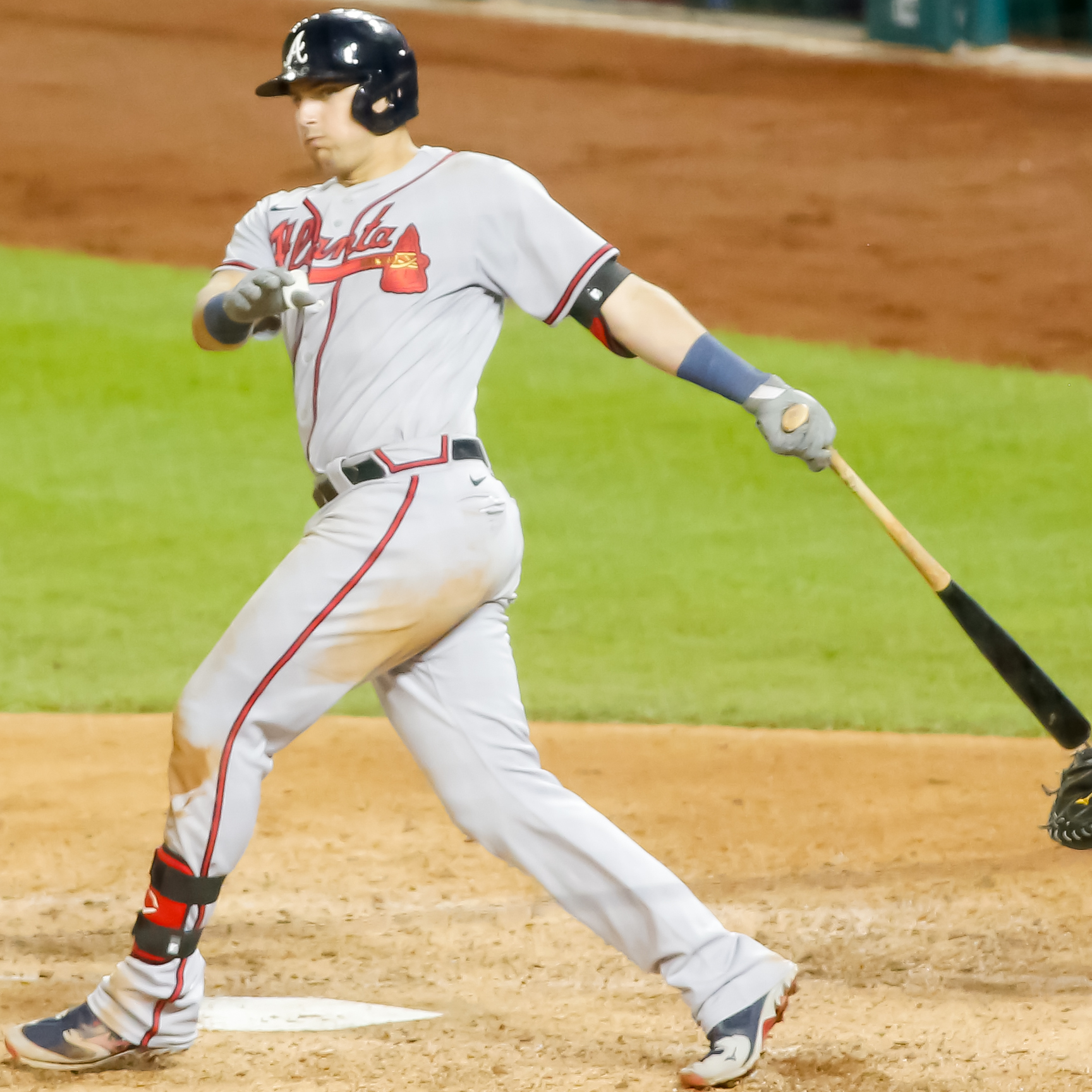
Riley with the Braves in 2020

In 2019 with the Braves he batted .226/.279/.471 with 18 home runs and 49 RBIs in 297 plate appearances. Defensively, he played 58 games in left field, six at first base, five at third base, and two in right field.

In 2020, he batted .239/.301/.415 with 8 home runs and 27 RBIs in 206 plate appearances. On defense, he played primarily third base (46 games), with four games each at first base and in left field. His six errors were the third-most among NL third basemen. He made his postseason debut, batting .178 with one home run in 12 games as Atlanta lost in the National League Championship Series.

After beginning the 2021 season in a hitting slump that saw him go 8-for-44 with no extra-base hits, Riley made a significant change to the mental aspect of his at bats, working with minor league hitting coach Mike Brumley to recognize where an off-speed pitch would land and avoid swinging at the sliders that pitchers had used against him. After batting in the back half of the lineup through late May, Riley was promoted to cleanup hitter, where he helped push the Braves back to the top of the NL East.

He finished the 2021 regular season hitting .303 with 33 home runs (10th in the NL), 107 RBIs (2nd), 168 strikeouts (4th), and a .898 OPS, joining Eddie Mathews and Chipper Jones as the only Atlanta third basemen to hit .300 with at least 30 home runs and 100 RBIs in a season at the age of 24 or younger. Ozzie Albies also reached those milestones, and the pair became the fifth set of teammates to each have 30-home run, 100-RBI seasons at the age of 24 or younger. On defense, Riley's 14 errors were second-most among NL third basemen, while his 300 assists ranked first.

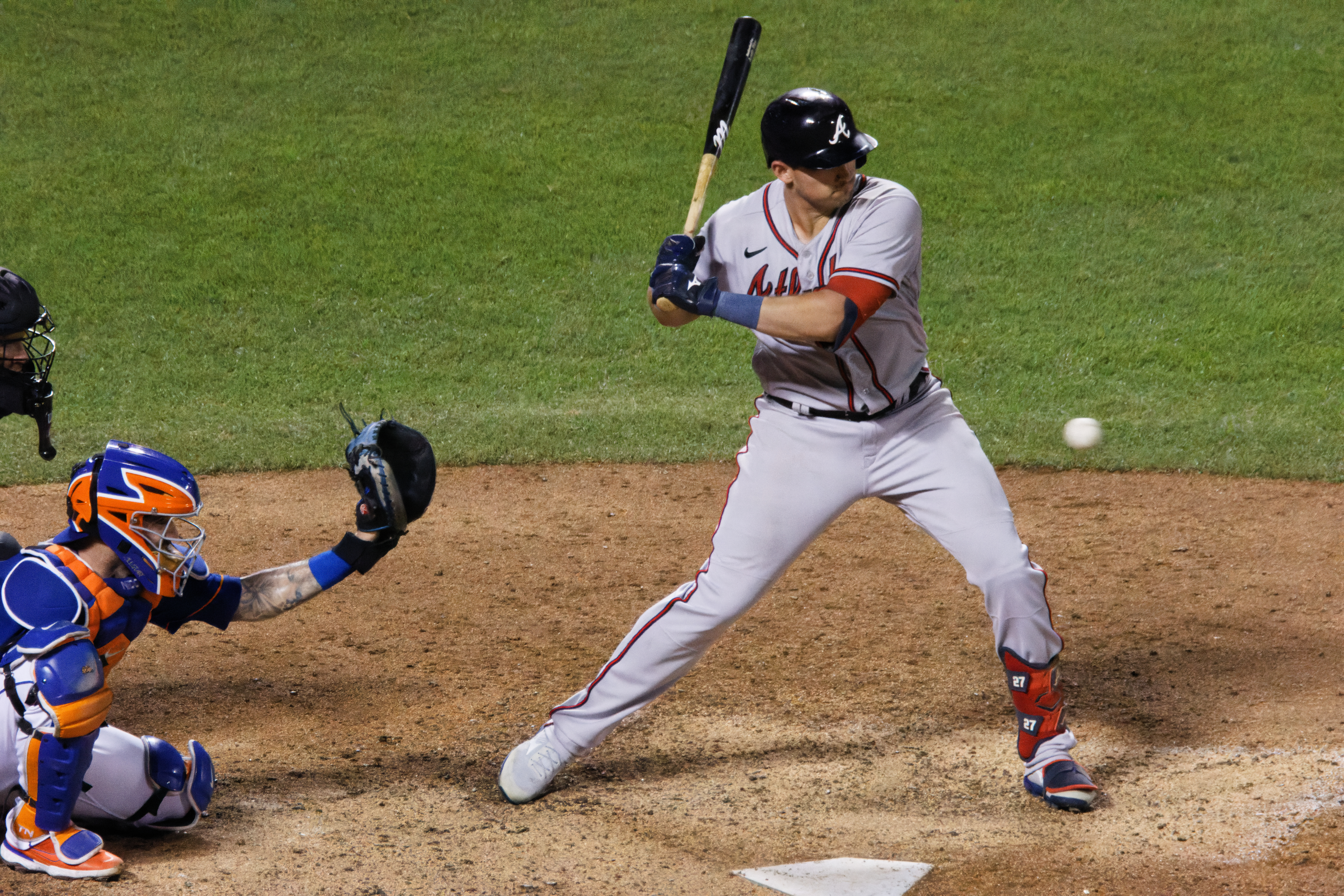
Riley batting against the New York Mets in 2022.

On October 16, Riley recorded his first career walk-off hit in Game 1 of the NLCS against the Los Angeles Dodgers, allowing Ozzie Albies to score and the Braves to win 3–2. In Game 6, Riley had 2 hits and 1 RBI to help the Braves close out the series. The Braves would eventually go onto win the 2021 World Series, earning Riley his first World Series ring. After the season ended, Riley and three teammates, Freddie Freeman, Max Fried, and Ozzie Albies, won the Silver Slugger Awards for their respective positions.

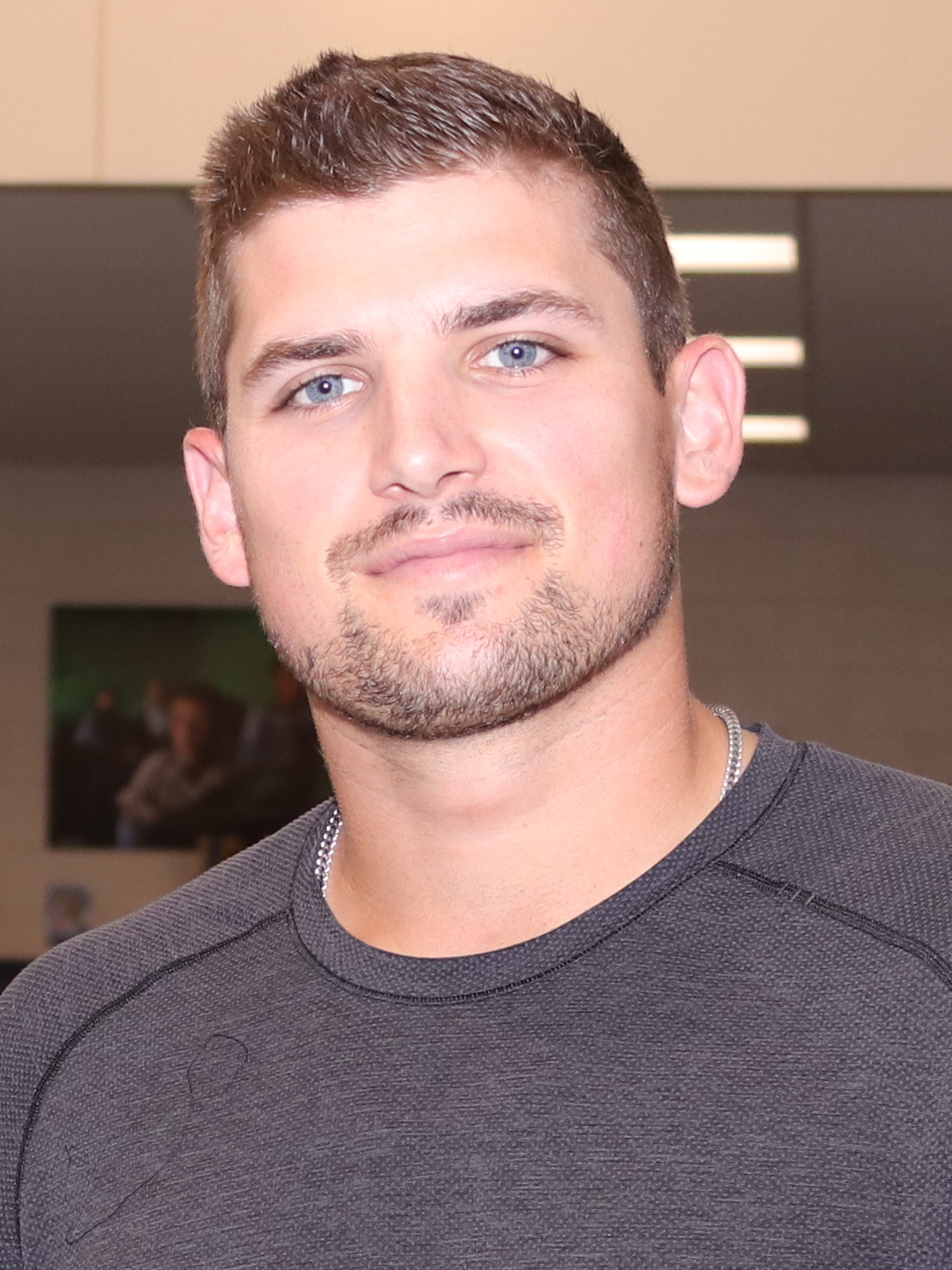
Riley in 2022

Riley was eligible for salary arbitration for the first time before the 2022 season. He sought to earn $4.25 million, and was instead awarded $3.95 million. On July 11, 2022, Riley earned Player of the Week honors for the first time in his career. On July 16, Riley was added to the All-Star Game as an injury replacement for Nolan Arenado. Riley set a franchise record by recording 26 extra base hits in July. He later won the NL Player of the Month award for July, the first such award in his career. On August 1, the Braves announced that Riley signed a ten-year contract extension worth $212 million. The contract is the largest in team history, exceeding the length and value of the extension Matt Olson signed before the 2022 season. On August 9, Riley hit his 30th home run and, in 111 games, tied Hank Aaron as the quickest players in franchise history to hit 30 doubles and 30 home runs in the same season.

In 2023, Riley was selected to the All-Star Game for second consecutive year. He won the second Silver Slugger Award of his career in 2023.

Injuries limited Riley in 2024. He missed 14 games in May with a strained intercostal muscle near his ribcage. On August 18, Riley was hit on the right hand by a Jack Kochanowicz pitch. The following day, he was diagnosed with a fracture. He missed the rest of the season. In 110 games, Riley hit .256 with 19 home runs and 56 RBI.

Riley's 2025 season was also ended by injuries. Between July 12 and July 25, he missed playing time due to a right abdominal strain. He sustained a lower abdominal strain during the MLB Speedway Classic, and returned to the injured list. In 102 appearances for Atlanta on the year, Riley batted .260/.309/.428 with 16 home runs and 54 RBI. On August 21, Riley underwent core injury surgery, and was moved to the 60-day injured list on September 1.

Riley had a down year in 2026, sporting the lowest batting average of his career, but on September 29, 2026, he hit a three-run go-ahead home run against the Philadelphia Phillies in game one of the 2026 National League Wild Card Series.

== Personal life ==
Riley and his wife, Anna, were married in November 2018. They resided in Coldwater, Mississippi. They announced in October 2021 they were expecting their first child, and their son was born in April 2022. The family later moved to Riley's hometown of Hernando, Mississippi. Their second son was born in July 2024.

Riley's cousin Keegan James played college baseball at Mississippi State. James was selected by the Colorado Rockies in the 25th round of the 2019 Major League Baseball draft. He pitched in the minor leagues until the Rockies released him in March 2024.
