= Nick Additon =

American baseball player (born 1987)

CTBC Brothers – No. 53
- Pitcher / Coach
- Born: December 16, 1987 (age 38); Davie, Florida, U.S.
- Batted: Right Threw: Left

Professional debut
- CPBL: August 11, 2016, for the Chinatrust Brothers
- KBO: April 9, 2017, for the Lotte Giants

Last appearance
- KBO: July 11, 2017, for the Lotte Giants
- CPBL: July 10, 2019, for the Chinatrust Brothers

CPBL statistics
- Win–loss record: 17–15
- Earned run average: 4.37
- Strikeouts: 229

KBO statistics
- Win–loss record: 2–7
- Earned run average: 5.91
- Strikeouts: 60
- Stats at Baseball Reference

Teams
- Chinatrust Brothers (2016); Lotte Giants (2017); Chinatrust Brothers (2017–2019)

Career highlights and awards
- CPBL: Pitched a no-hitter on June 9, 2018

Nicholas Scott Additon (born December 16, 1987) is an American former professional baseball pitcher. He played in the KBO League for the Lotte Giants and the Chinese Professional Baseball League (CPBL) for the Chinatrust Brothers.

== Career ==
=== St. Louis Cardinals ===
Prior to playing professionally, he attended Western High School in Davie and then Indian River State College before being drafted by the St. Louis Cardinals in the 47th round of the 2006 Major League Baseball draft. He began his professional career the next year.

Additon posted ERAs of 3.41, 2.23 and 3.11 in his first three seasons. Notably, in 2008, he was 9–5 with a 2.50 ERA for the Quad Cities River Bandits and 2–0 with a 0.50 ERA for the Palm Beach Cardinals. Additon was 9–6 with a 4.43 record for the Springfield Cardinals in 2010 and in 2011, he was 8-9 between Springfield and the Memphis Redbirds. He pitched for the Gulf Coast League Cardinals and Memphis in 2012 and in 2013, he was 9–7 with a 4.10 ERA for Memphis. On November 4, 2013, Additon elected free agency.

=== Baltimore Orioles ===
On November 16, 2013, Additon signed a minor league contract with the Baltimore Orioles. He played 2014 with the Double-A Bowie Baysox and the Triple-A Norfolk Tides. Additon became a free agent after the season.

=== Milwaukee Brewers ===
On November 25, 2014, Additon signed a minor league deal with the Milwaukee Brewers. He was assigned to the Triple–A Colorado Springs Sky Sox. The Brewers released Additon on August 2, 2015.

=== Baltimore Orioles (second stint) ===
On August 9, 2015, Additon signed a minor league contract with the Baltimore Orioles organization and was assigned to the Double–A Bowie Baysox. Additon played for the Triple–A Norfolk Tides before he was released on August 3, 2016.

=== Chinatrust Brothers ===
Additon signed with the Chinatrust Brothers of the Chinese Professional Baseball League shortly after his release from Baltimore. He also began the 2017 season with Chinatrust before being released partway into the season.

=== Lotte Giants ===
Additon joined the Lotte Giants of the KBO League for 2017. At the time of his signing with the Korean club, he had spent part or all of six seasons at Triple-A, going 28–41 with a 4.41 ERA in 559 2/3 innings.

=== Colorado Rockies ===
On August 6, 2017, Additon signed a minor league deal with the Colorado Rockies and was assigned to the Double–A Hartford Yard Goats. In 5 starts with Hartford, Additon registered an 0–4 record and 2.45 ERA with 26 strikeouts in 25 2/3 innings of work. He elected free agency following the season on November 6.

=== Chinatrust Brothers (second stint) ===
On January 17, 2018, Additon signed with the Chinatrust Brothers of the Chinese Professional Baseball League. On June 9, 2018, Additon threw a no-hitter against the Uni-President Lions, becoming the eighth player in the 29-year history of the CPBL to accomplish such a feat. In December 2018, Additon re-signed with the Brothers for the 2019 season. However, following a start on July 9, 2019, in which he injured his shoulder, he was released by the Brothers the next day.

=== Retirement ===
Additon retired as an active player following the 2019 season and later was hired as an international scout for the Chinatrust Brothers.

Additon has also spent multiple seasons in the Mexican Pacific Winter League and Dominican Winter League, playing for the Venados de Mazatlan and Leones del Escogido.

== Personal life ==
Additon's older brother Ryan is an umpire in Major League Baseball.
