= Stu Scheurwater =

Canadian baseball umpire (born 1983)

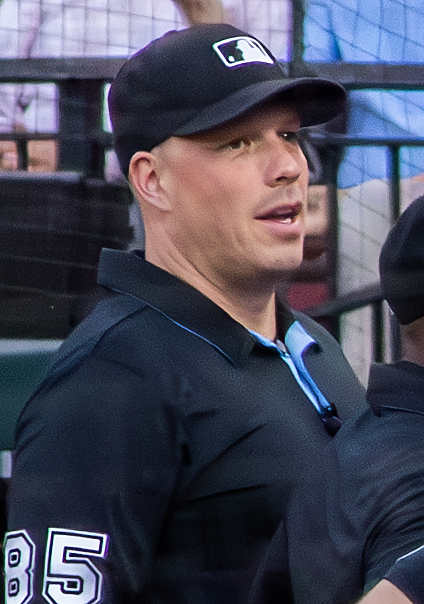
- Scheurwater in 2023

MLB – No. 85
- Umpire
- Born: May 6, 1983 (age 43); Regina, Saskatchewan, Canada

MLB debut
- April 25, 2014

Crew information
- Umpiring crew: S
- Crew members: #71 Jordan Baker (crew chief); #8 Rob Drake; #85 Stu Scheurwater; #25 Junior Valentine

Career highlights and awards
- Special Assignments: All-Star Games (2023); Wild Card Game/Series (2020, 2023, 2025); Division Series (2020, 2022); League Championship Series (2023); World Baseball Classic (2023); MLB Little League Classic (2019)

Stuart Jeffrey Scheurwater (born May 6, 1983) is a Canadian Major League Baseball (MLB) umpire. He made his MLB debut on April 25, 2014, and was hired to the full-time staff in December 2017.

Scheurwater grew up in Regina, Saskatchewan and aspired to play in the Canadian Football League like his uncle, Scott Redl. He made it as far as the Regina Thunder of the Canadian Junior Football League but, after failing to make the squads of the University of Regina or the University of Saskatchewan, he began umpiring baseball games.

Prior to his professional career, Scheurwater was a member of Baseball Canada’s National Umpiring program and worked the Baseball Canada Cup in 2005 Medicine Hat and the 21U National Championship in 2006 in Guelph, Ontario.

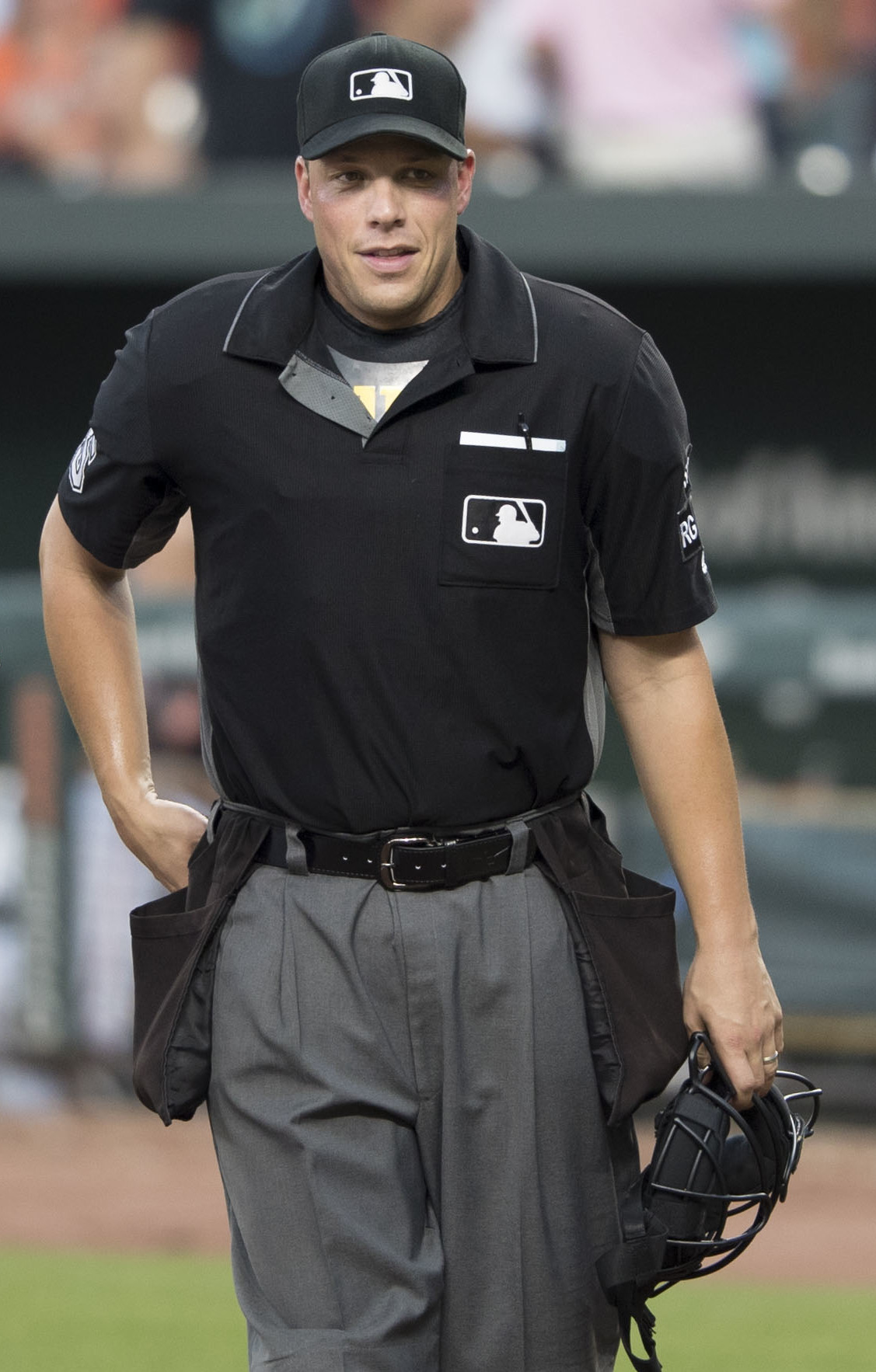
Scheurwater in 2017

Scheurwater began working Minor League Baseball games in 2007. He was hired to fill the vacancy left by Dale Scott's retirement. Scheurwater became the first permanent Major League umpire from Canada since Jim McKean's retirement in 2001.

== See also ==
- List of Major League Baseball umpires (disambiguation)
