= Hurston Waldrep =

American baseball player (born 2002)

Atlanta Braves – No. 64
- Pitcher
- Born: March 1, 2002 (age 24); Cairo, Georgia, U.S.
- Bats: Right Throws: Right

MLB debut
- June 9, 2024, for the Atlanta Braves

MLB statistics (through 2026 season)
- Win–loss record: 6–3
- Earned run average: 4.99
- Strikeouts: 67
- Stats at Baseball Reference

Teams
- Atlanta Braves (2024–present)
Medals
Men's baseball
Representing the United States
Haarlem Baseball Week
Bronze medal – third place	2022	Team

Hurston Wayne Waldrep (born March 1, 2002) is an American professional baseball pitcher for the Atlanta Braves of Major League Baseball (MLB). He made his MLB debut in 2024.

== Amateur career ==
Waldrep attended Thomasville High School in Thomasville, Georgia, where he played on their baseball team as a pitcher and on their football team as a placekicker and punter. He earned All-State honors in both sports. He went unselected in the shortened 2020 Major League Baseball draft and enrolled at the University of Southern Mississippi to play college baseball.

As a freshman for the Southern Mississippi Golden Eagles in 2021, Waldrep pitched 16 1/3 innings in relief and had a 1–0 win–loss record with a 3.31 earned run average (ERA) and 16 strikeouts. For the 2022 season, he became Southern Mississippi's Sunday starter. Over 17 starts, he went 6–2 with a 3.20 ERA, 140 strikeouts, and 33 walks over 90 innings.

After the season, Waldrep entered the transfer portal and transferred to the University of Florida. That summer, he played with the USA Baseball Collegiate National Team. He entered the 2023 season as a top prospect for the upcoming MLB draft. For the Florida Gators that season, he started 19 games and went 10–3 with a 4.16 ERA and 156 strikeouts over 101 2/3 innings.

== Professional career ==
The Atlanta Braves selected Waldrep in the first round, with the 24th overall pick, in the 2023 Major League Baseball draft. On July 13, Waldrep signed with the Braves for a deal worth $2,997,500. He made his professional debut with the Single-A Augusta GreenJackets, striking out eight in a single three-inning start, before earning a promotion to the High-A Rome Braves. In Rome, Waldrep threw twelve innings and seventeen strikeouts, leading to his promotion to the Double-A Mississippi Braves. With Mississippi, he had a 2.70 ERA and 11 strikeouts in ten innings. On September 23, 2023, Waldrep made his first appearance at the Triple–A level, with the Gwinnett Stripers, recording five strikeouts over four scoreless innings.

Prior to the 2024 regular season, Waldrep was invited to spring training. He began the season at Double-A Mississippi. On June 1, he was promoted to Triple-A Gwinnett. Waldrep made a total of 19 minor league starts in 2024 and went 5-7 with a 3.47 ERA and 92 strikeouts over 91 2/3 innings.

On June 9, 2024, Waldrep was selected to the 40-man roster and promoted to the major leagues for the first time. He made his MLB debut the same day versus the Washington Nationals and allowed seven runs on four hits and four walks along with one strikeout, that of Eddie Rosario, in an 8-5 Braves loss. Across two starts during his rookie campaign, Waldrep struggled to an 0-1 record and 16.71 ERA with three strikeouts over seven innings of work.

Waldrep was optioned to Gwinnett to begin the 2025 season. He started 19 games for Gwinnett during the season and went 7-8 with a 4.42 ERA. The Braves recalled Waldrep to the major leagues on August 3. That same day, Waldrep earned his first career win in the Speedway Classic versus the Cincinnati Reds in a 4-2 Braves victory in which he pitched 5 2/3 innings and gave up one run. He was scheduled to start for Gwinnett on that day, but was temporarily promoted as Atlanta's 27th man when the Speedway Classic was suspended due to rain the previous day. Waldrep became the first pitcher credited with a win in the state of Tennessee in MLB history, and it was also the first MLB win by a Thomasville-based pitcher since Levale Speigner in 2007. Waldrep appeared in ten games (nine starts) for the Braves and went 6-1 with a 2.88 ERA and 55 strikeouts over 56 1/3 innings.

While pitching in spring training in February 2026, Waldrep reported elbow soreness, with preliminary tests indicated the presence of loose bodies in his pitching elbow. On February 18, it was reported that Waldrep would need to undergo a surgery to remove the loose bodies. He was optioned to Triple-A Gwinnett upon being activated from the injured list on June 12. Waldrep made three appearances (including two starts) for Atlanta, logging an 0–1 record and 8.44 ERA with nine strikeouts across 10 2/3 innings pitched. On August 28, it was announced that Waldrep would undergo Tommy John surgery, ending his season prematurely.

== Pitching style ==
As a prospect, the quality of Waldrep's splitter drew particular attention.
