= Junior Valentine =

American baseball umpire (born 1987)

MLB – No. 25
- Umpire
- Born: October 21, 1987 (age 38); Cosby, Tennessee, U.S.

MLB debut
- August 26, 2020

Crew information
- Umpiring crew: S
- Crew members: #71 Jordan Baker (crew chief); #8 Rob Drake; #85 Stu Scheurwater; #25 Junior Valentine

Career highlights and awards
- Special Assignments: Wild Card Games/Series (2024, 2025); MLB Speedway Classic (2025)

Junior Taylor Valentine (born October 21, 1987) is an American professional baseball umpire. He has been an umpire in Major League Baseball since 2020, and was promoted to the full-time umpiring staff in 2023. Valentine wears uniform number 25.

== Early life ==
Valentine was born in Cosby, Tennessee and attended Maryville College, graduating with a degree in history with teaching license. He attended the Wendelstedt Umpire School in 2011, at which he is now the chief instructor.

== Career ==
During Valentine's career as an umpire he has officiated games in the Appalachian League, Florida Instructional League, Arizona Instructional League, Carolina League, Eastern League, and Pacific Coast League, as well as the Arizona Fall League. He was part of the umpiring crew for the 2015 Futures Game in Cincinnati and the 2019 AAA All-Star Game in El Paso, Texas.

Valentine made his Major League debut on August 26, 2020, in the second game of a doubleheader between the New York Yankees and Atlanta Braves.

On September 13, 2021, he was hit in the face with a throw by Edmundo Sosa, but remained in the game.

He received praise for calling a near-perfect game on May 9, 2023, missing just one call in the matchup between the Kansas City Royals and Chicago White Sox.

On June 24, 2023, Valentine called a controversial balk on Astros pitcher Ryne Stanek which led to James Outman scoring the go-ahead run in an 8-7 Dodgers victory. On May 24, 2024, Valentine received both praise and criticism for a controversial "infield fly interference" double play call in the game between the Chicago White Sox and Baltimore Orioles, where he called Andrew Vaughn out for interfering with Shortstop Gunnar Henderson's ability to field a hit off Andrew Benintendi. Despite criticism from the league office, the rules revealed Valentine made the correct call.

== Personal life ==
Valentine lives in Tennessee.
