= Ryan Wills =

American baseball umpire (born 1987)

MLB – No. 20
- Umpire
- Born: September 27, 1987 (age 39)

MLB debut
- August 22, 2020

Crew information
- Umpiring crew: G
- Crew members: #23 Lance Barksdale (crew chief); #93 Will Little; #67 Ryan Additon; #20 Ryan Wills

Career highlights and awards
- Special assignments: Division Series (2026)

Ryan A. Wills (born September 27, 1987) is an American professional baseball umpire. He has been an umpire in Major League Baseball since 2020, and was promoted to the full-time umpiring staff in 2024. Wills wears uniform number 20, previously worn by Tom Hallion.

== Career ==
A graduate of the Jim Evans umpiring school, Wills spent his Minor League career working in the Gulf Coast League, Appalachian League, South Atlantic League, California League, Texas League, Eastern League and International League, in addition to the Florida Instructional League and Arizona Fall League. His first major league game was between the and Miami Marlins and Washington Nationals at Nationals Park on August 22, 2020. He worked the game with Ron Kulpa, Chris Segal and Ramon De Jesus.

Wills was promoted to full-time staff alongside Clint Vondrak in February 2024. They filled spots left by the retirements of Ed Hickox and Jeff Nelson.

== See also ==
- List of major league baseball umpires
