= Austin Cox =

American baseball player (born 1997)

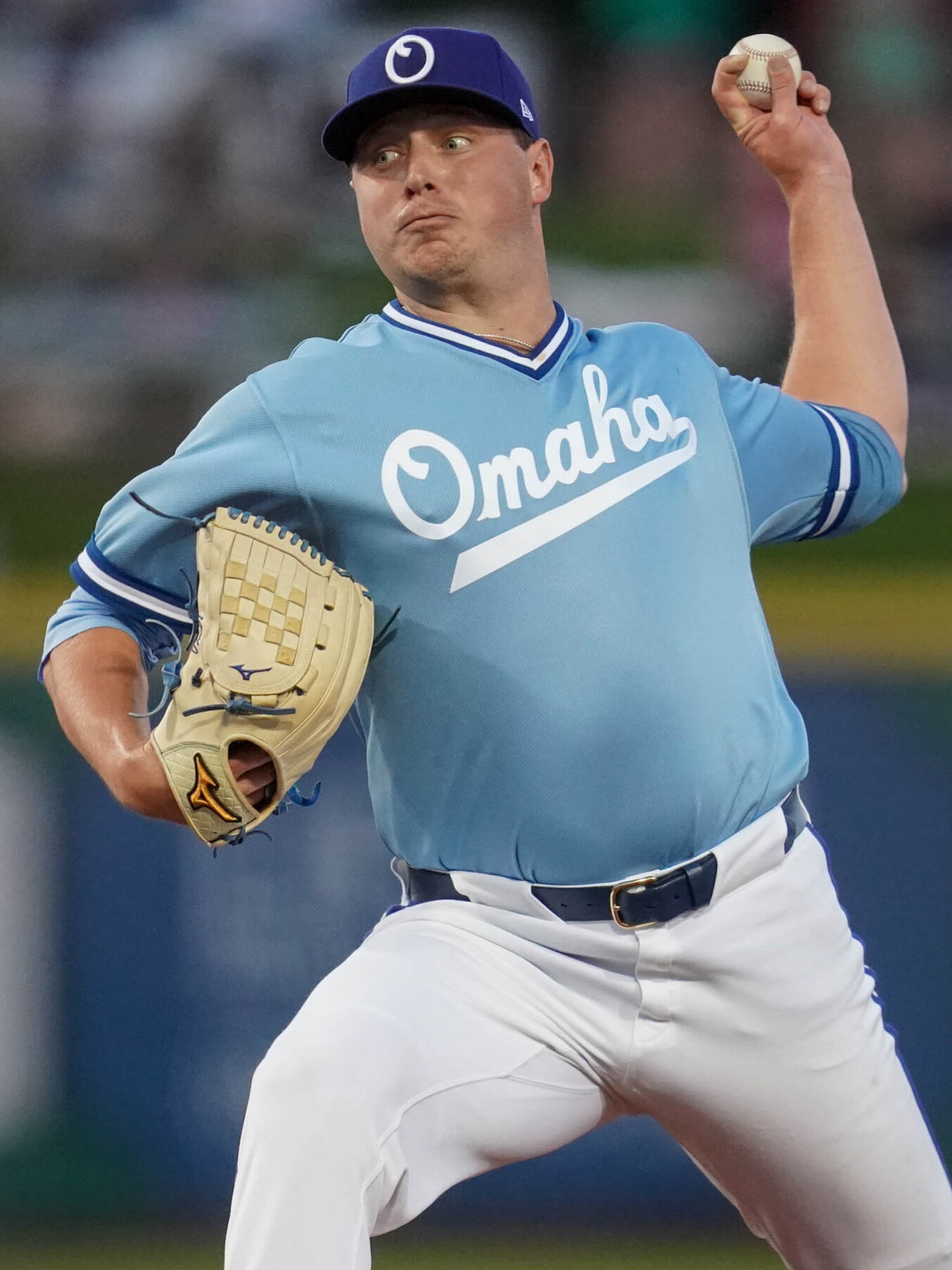
- Cox with the Omaha Storm Chasers in 2024

Free agent
- Pitcher
- Born: March 28, 1997 (age 29); Macon, Georgia, U.S.
- Bats: Left Throws: Left

Professional debut
- MLB: May 4, 2023, for the Kansas City Royals
- NPB: April 1, 2026, for the Yokohama DeNA BayStars

MLB statistics (through 2025 season)
- Win–loss record: 0–1
- Earned run average: 6.16
- Strikeouts: 55

NPB statistics (through 2026 season)
- Win–loss record: 1–0
- Earned run average: 3.00
- Strikeouts: 7
- Stats at Baseball Reference

Teams
- Kansas City Royals (2023); Atlanta Braves (2025); Yokohama DeNA BayStars (2026)

Austin Cox (born March 28, 1997) is an American professional baseball pitcher who is a free agent. He has previously played in Major League Baseball (MLB) for the Kansas City Royals and Atlanta Braves and in Nippon Professional Baseball (NPB) for the Yokohama DeNA BayStars. He made his MLB debut in 2023.

== Amateur career ==
Cox attended First Presbyterian Day School in Macon, Georgia, where he played baseball and football. For his high school career, he went 15–6 with a 2.19 ERA. Undrafted in the 2015 Major League Baseball draft, he fulfilled his commitment to play college baseball at Mercer University.

In 2016, Cox's freshman year at Mercer, he pitched 24 innings, compiling a 2–2 record and a 10.13 ERA. As a sophomore in 2017, he started 15 games, going 4–2 with a 5.69 ERA. In 2018, his junior season, he was named Mercer's Friday night starter. Over 17 starts, Cox pitched to a 7–4 record with a 4.52 ERA, striking out 124 batters over 87 2/3 innings.

== Professional career ==
=== Kansas City Royals ===
The Kansas City Royals drafted Cox in the fifth round, with the 152nd overall selection, of the 2018 Major League Baseball draft. He signed with the Royals and made his professional debut with the Burlington Royals of the Rookie-level Appalachian League, pitching to a 1–1 record and a 3.78 ERA over nine starts. In 2019, he began the year with the Lexington Legends of the Single–A South Atlantic League, with whom he was named an All-Star alongside earning Pitcher of the Week honors in early June. On June 23, 2019, he was promoted to the Wilmington Blue Rocks of the High–A Carolina League, and finished the season there. Over 24 games (23 starts) between the two teams, he went 8–6 with a 2.76 ERA, compiling 129 strikeouts and 38 walks over 130 2/3 innings. Cox did not play a minor league game in 2020 due to the cancellation of the minor league season because of the COVID-19 pandemic.

To begin the 2021 season, he was assigned to the Northwest Arkansas Naturals of the Double-A Central, and was promoted to the Omaha Storm Chasers of the Triple-A East in late September. Over 17 games (16 starts) between the two clubs, Cox went 4-1 with a 4.10 ERA and 56 strikeouts over 63 innings. He returned to Omaha for the 2022 season. Over 29 games (24 starts), he went 7-7 with a 4.21 ERA and 105 strikeouts over 147 1/3 innings. Cox began the 2023 season with Omaha, posting a 2.21 ERA, 22 strikeouts, and 11 walks in 20 1/3 innings pitched across five games (four starts).

On May 3, 2023, Cox was selected to the 40-man roster and promoted to the major leagues for the first time. He proceeded to set a modern Major League Baseball record by not allowing a hit to any of the first 39 batters he faced. In 24 appearances for Kansas City, Cox logged a 4.54 ERA with 33 strikeouts in 35 2/3 innings pitched. On September 8, Cox departed an outing against the Toronto Blue Jays after he was struck by an Alejandro Kirk come backer and collapsed in pain as he tried to cover first base. The next day, he was placed on the 60–day injured list, ending his season. On September 12, Cox was diagnosed with a full ACL tear in his left knee, as well as damage to his MCL in the same knee. On November 17, Cox was designated for assignment by the Royals following the acquisition of Nick Anderson. The following day, Kansas City re-signed him to a minor league contract.

Cox spent the 2024 campaign with Triple–A Omaha, compiling a 3.90 ERA with 31 strikeouts across 30 innings pitched. On July 11, 2024, Cox opted out of his minor league contract and elected free agency. Cox re–signed with the Royals on a new minor league contract on July 16. He elected free agency following the season on November 4.

On January 2, 2025, Cox re-signed with the Royals on a new minor league contract. In 11 appearances for Triple-A Omaha, he posted a 2-1 record and 3.55 ERA with 18 strikeouts across 12 2/3 innings pitched. Cox was released by the Royals organization on May 4.

=== Atlanta Braves ===
On May 4, 2025, Cox signed a major league contract with the Atlanta Braves and was optioned to the Triple–A Gwinnett Stripers. In 13 appearances for Atlanta, he struggled to an 8.86 ERA with 22 strikeouts across 21 1/3 innings pitched. On November 6, Cox was removed from the 40-man roster and sent outright to Triple-A Gwinnett. He elected free agency the same day.

=== Yokohama DeNA BayStars ===
On December 10, 2025, Cox signed with the Yokohama DeNA BayStars of Nippon Professional Baseball. He was released on June 8, 2026, following season-ending elbow surgery.
