= Lance Barksdale =

American baseball umpire (born 1967)

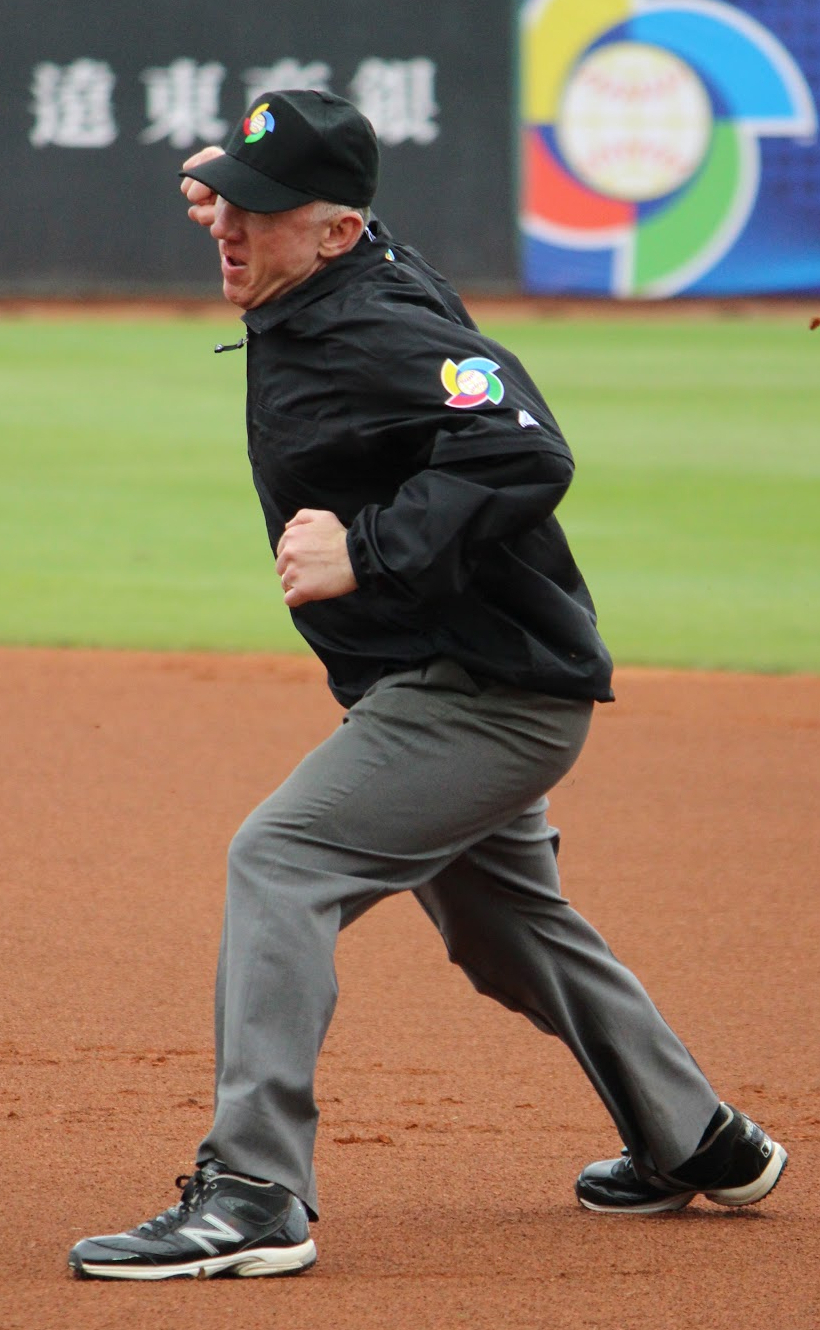
- Barksdale umpiring in the 2013 World Baseball Classic
- Born: March 8, 1967 (age 59); Brookhaven, Mississippi, U.S.

MLB debut
- May 29, 2000

Last appearance
- September 22, 2026
- Stats at Baseball Reference

Career highlights and awards
- Special Assignments: All-Star Games (2012, 2022); Wild Card Games/Series (2013, 2017, 2020, 2023); Division Series (2014, 2015, 2018, 2019, 2022, 2024, 2025); League Championship Series (2017, 2020, 2021, 2023); World Series (2019, 2022); World Baseball Classic (2006, 2009, 2013, 2017, 2023); MLB Speedway Classic (2025)

Robert Lance Barksdale (born March 8, 1967) is an American former umpire in Major League Baseball (MLB). He began umpiring in the major leagues in 2000 and joined the full-time major league staff in 2006.

Barksdale wore #23, which was previously worn by Rick Reed. He was promoted to crew chief in the 2023 season.

== Umpiring career ==
Barksdale umpired in the minor leagues from 1993 to 2006. His minor league service included the Appalachian League, the South Atlantic League, the Florida State League, the Florida Instructional League, the Southern League, the Pacific Coast League, the Arizona Fall League and the International League.

Barksdale served as a major league fill-in umpire between 2000 and his full-time MLB promotion in 2006. He was added to crew Q, led by Dale Scott, when he was called up permanently.

Barksdale was the home plate umpire when Randy Johnson struck out 20 Cincinnati Reds batters at Bank One Ballpark on May 8, 2001.

Barksdale was at first base on August 7, 2004, for Greg Maddux's 300th win and also at first base on June 1, 2012, when Johan Santana threw a no-hitter. He has also umpired in the World Baseball Classic in 2009 and 2013, the Major League Baseball All-Star Game in 2012 and 2022, the Wild Card Game/Series in 2013, 2017, 2020 and 2023, the Division Series in 2014, 2015, 2018, 2019, 2022, 2024 and 2025, the Championship Series in 2017, 2020, 2021 and 2023 and the World Series in 2019 and 2022.

Barksdale was the third base umpire for Henderson Alvarez's no-hitter on September 29, 2013.

Barksdale was the home plate umpire when Wade Miley of the Cincinnati Reds threw a no hitter against the Cleveland Indians on May 7, 2021.

On March 21, 2023, Barksdale was the home plate umpire for the final game of the World Baseball Classic between Japan and the United States.

On July 5, 2026, USA Today's Bob Nightengale reported that Barksdale was one of seven umpires who had accepted a buyout from Major League Baseball to retire after the 2026 season.

Barksdale was a Replay umpire for the 2026 ALDS.

== Personal life ==
Barksdale graduated from Forest Hill High School in Jackson, Mississippi in 1985 and went on to play college baseball for the Mississippi College Choctaws, during which time he began umpiring Little League games. He lives in Mississippi with his wife and two children.
