= Diamondbacks–Dodgers rivalry =

Major League Baseball rivalry

- Arizona Diamondbacks Los Angeles Dodgers
- Location: Western United States
- First meeting: April 7, 1998; Dodger Stadium, Los Angeles, California; Dodgers 9, Diamondbacks 1
- Latest meeting: August 9, 2026; Chase Field, Phoenix, Arizona; Diamondbacks 4, Dodgers 2
- Next meeting: April 5, 2027; Chase Field, Phoenix, Arizona
- Stadiums: Diamondbacks: Chase Field; Dodgers: Dodger Stadium

Statistics
- Total meetings: 497
- All-time series: Dodgers, 282–215 (.567)
- Regular season series: Dodgers, 279–212 (.568)
- Postseason results: Tie, 3–3
- Largest victory: Diamondbacks, 13–0 (September 4, 2017); Dodgers, 22–1 (July 10, 2021)
- Longest win streak: Diamondbacks, 11 (August 29, 2017–April 14, 2018); Dodgers, 10 (May 16–September 13, 2022)
- Current win streak: Diamondbacks, 1

Post-season history
- 2017 NL Division Series: Dodgers won, 3–0; 2023 NL Division Series: Diamondbacks won, 3–0

Locations of the Arizona Diamondbacks and Los Angeles Dodgers

The Diamondbacks–Dodgers rivalry is a Major League Baseball (MLB) National League divisional rivalry played between the Arizona Diamondbacks and the Los Angeles Dodgers. Chase Field and Dodger Stadium are only 375 miles apart, mostly along I-10. The Diamondbacks are newcomers to the division; having founded in 1998, winning their first World Series in 2001. The Dodgers had been one of the oldest teams in the National League, having won nine World Series titles. Both teams saw a rise in competition during the 2010s as they would both regularly qualify for the postseason, notably; regular season meetings between the two would often escalate into aggressive matchups occasionally escalating into fights between both benches. Notably; both teams took part in the most recent MLB Australia Series in 2014.

As of August 9, 2026, the Dodgers lead the regular season series, 279–212. The two teams have met twice in the postseason, with the Dodgers winning the 2017 National League Division Series 3–0, and the Diamondbacks winning the 2023 National League Division Series 3–0.

== Background ==
The rivalry was often dormant for the Diamondbacks' earlier years in the league following their inception in 1998 (the two teams did have a close divisional race in 2008, before the D'Backs fell apart in September), however things quickly began to heat up between both sides during the 2010s as the Dodgers saw a change in management in 2011 after controversial owner Frank McCourt had sold the team. Eventually the Dodgers found their return to the postseason as their strength in competition found new life under different management. The first notable moment of animosity between the two teams took place in September 2011 when both teams began hitting one another with inside pitches, including a notable moment where Clayton Kershaw was ejected on September 13 for throwing a fastball at Arizona outfielder Gerardo Parra's shoulder. The two would continue engaging in aggressive confrontations as the 2012 season would see more retaliatory acts on both sides. During the 2013 season as both teams were engaged in a heated battle for second place of the division; the two sides engaged in a large scuffle on June 13, after Diamondbacks' pitcher Ian Kennedy drilled Dodgers' outfielder Yasiel Puig in the face with a pitch. Dodgers' then-pitcher Zack Greinke retaliated by hitting Arizona catcher Miguel Montero while at bat; resulting in both benches clearing in a massive brawl after Kennedy threw a pitch at Greinke the next inning. Kennedy was suspended 10 games for the hit, however; Puig and Greinke received a fine for their part.

On September 19, 2013 following a win in Arizona, The Dodgers managed a victory after having clinched the division and eliminating the Diamondbacks. Much to the anger of the Diamondbacks and fans alike; numerous Dodgers' players jumped into the outfield pool at Chase Field. Allegedly; stadium management had warned Dodger personnel against celebrating the win onfield due to the tensions between the two teams. Diamondbacks' then-CEO Derrick Hall expressed anger at the gesture by the Dodgers, proclaiming: "I could call it disrespectful and classless, but they don't have a beautiful pool at their old park and must have really wanted to see what one was like".

Since Arizona did not have an MLB franchise prior to 1998, many residents have supported the Dodgers before the Diamondbacks debuted. Due to the Dodgers' extensive fanbase in the southwestern United States, games between the Dodgers and Diamondbacks at the latter team's home stadium Chase Field often have a split crowd in attendance.

=== 2017: First NLDS matchup ===
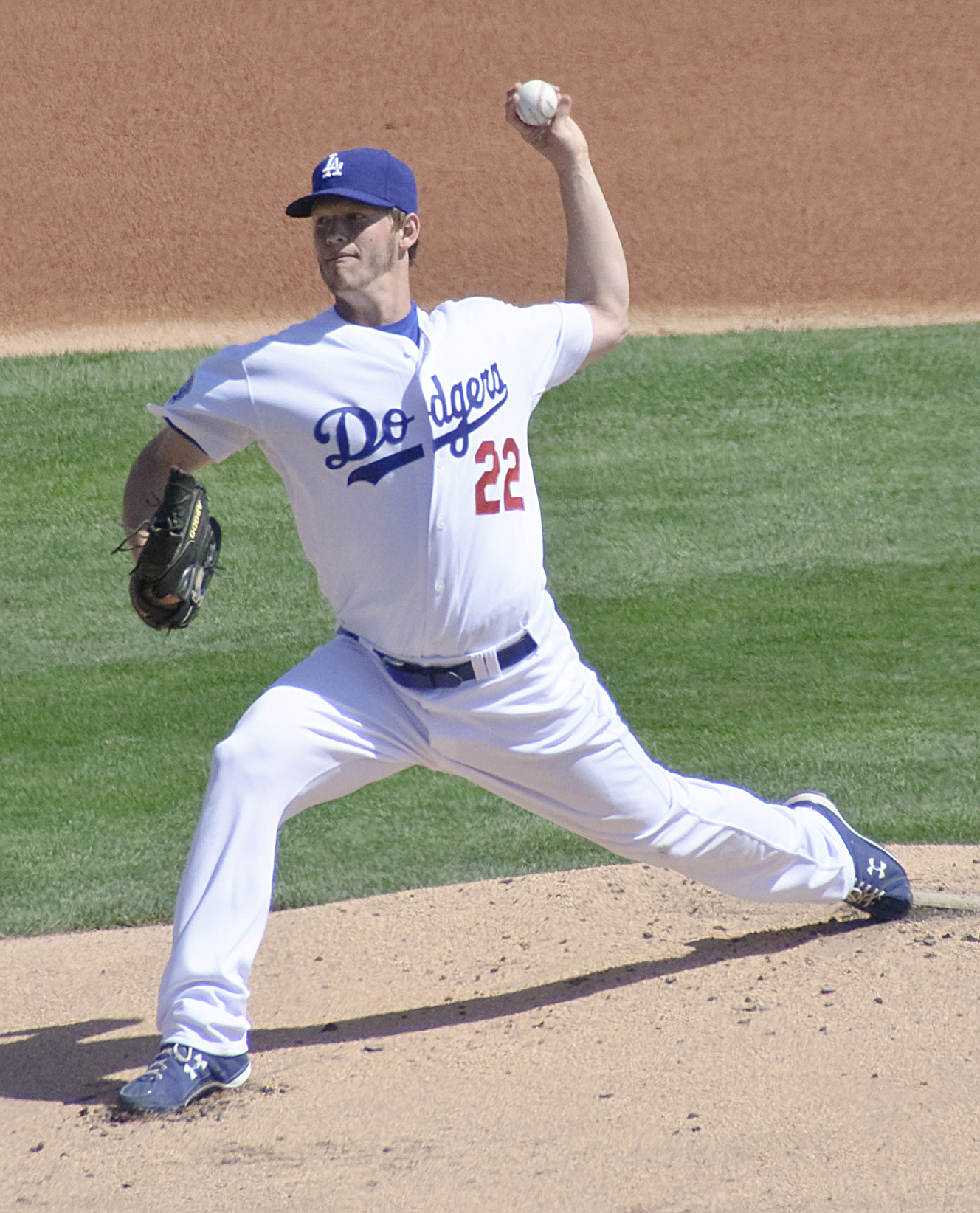
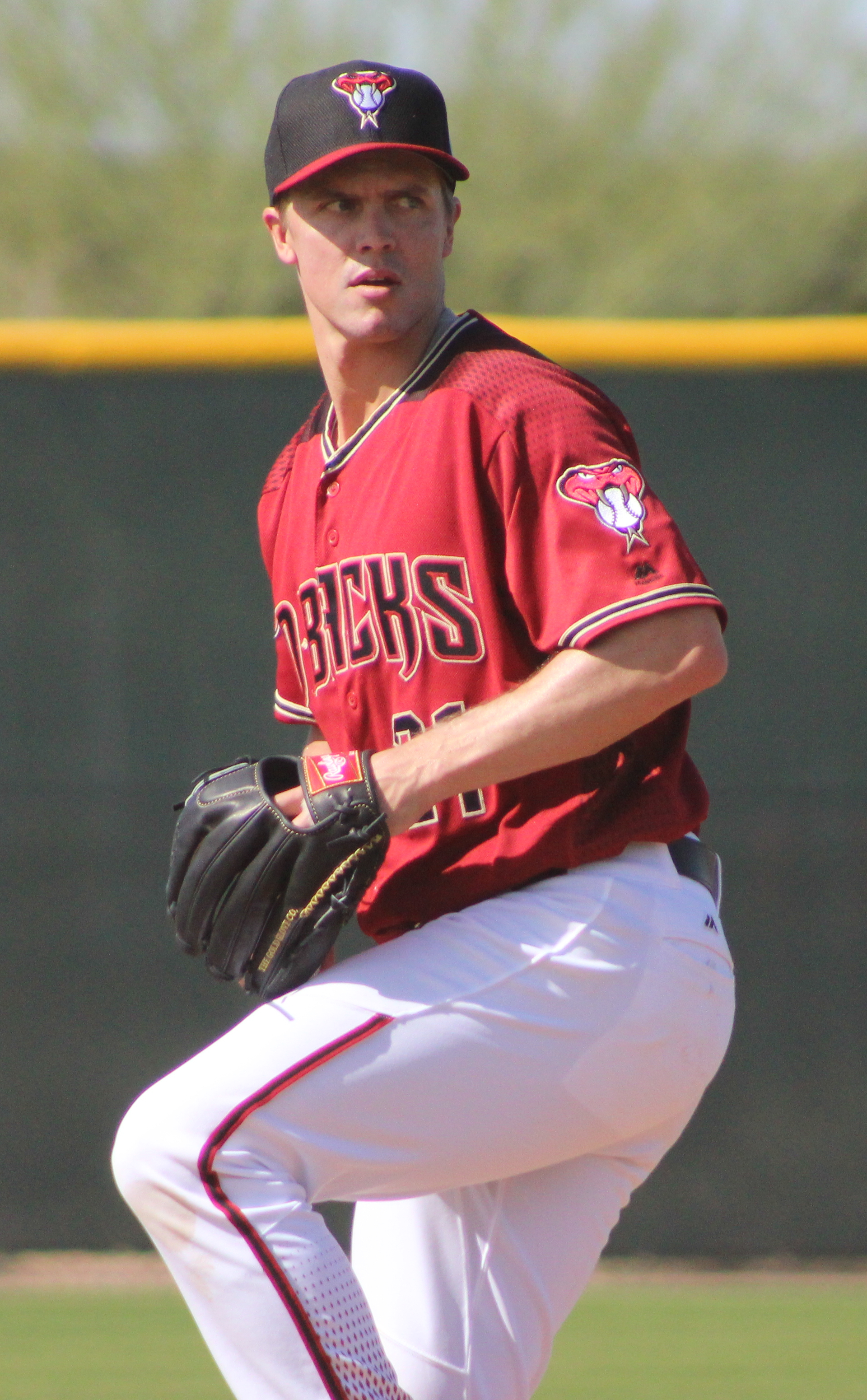
The Dodgers' Clayton Kershaw and the Diamondbacks' Zack Greinke were both finalists for the Cy Young award in 2017.

On December 8, 2015; Zack Greinke signed a six-year, $206.5 million contract with the Diamondbacks. By 2017; both teams had managed to secure playoff berths as the Diamondbacks finished with 93 wins while the Dodgers finished with 104, leading the division and the league. After winning the Wild Card Game; the Diamondbacks were set to face the Dodgers in the NL Division Series. Despite Arizona's best efforts; they were no match for the Dodgers' copious batting core as they fell in a 3 game sweep. The Dodgers would go on to reach the 2017 World Series, where they lost to the Houston Astros in a controversial seven-game series.

=== 2023: Second NLDS matchup ===
The second half of the 2023 season saw the Dodgers win the NL West and the Diamondbacks finish second, securing the final Wild Card spot in the league. Following a 2-game sweep of the Milwaukee Brewers in the NL Wild Card Series, the Diamondbacks were set to once again face the Dodgers in the NL Division Series. Game 1 saw an aggressive showing from the Diamondbacks against Clayton Kershaw as they scored 11 runs within the first four innings, running away with the victory. The Diamondbacks would eventually earn a sweep with their 4-2 victories in Games 2 and 3. Notably, Arizona clinched the series at Chase Field, marking their first postseason series win at home since their World Series walkoff victory over the New York Yankees in 2001. Game 3 was also notable for the third inning where Geraldo Perdomo, Ketel Marte, Christian Walker, and Gabriel Moreno each hit a home run in the bottom of the third inning, making it the first time ever in playoff history where a team hit four home runs in one inning. The Diamondbacks later reached the 2023 World Series, losing to the Texas Rangers in five games.

As of the end of the 2026 regular season, the Dodgers lead the regular season series 279–212, but are tied with a 3–3 record in postseason meetings (and by extension, are tied 1–1 in postseason series matchups).

== Season-by-season results ==
Diamondbacks vs. Dodgers Season-by-Season Results
1990s (Dodgers, 14–11)

Season	Season series		at Arizona Diamondbacks	at Los Angeles Dodgers	Overall series	Notes
1998	Dodgers	8‍–‍4	Dodgers, 4‍–‍2	Dodgers, 4‍–‍2	Dodgers; 8‍–‍4	
1999	Diamondbacks	7‍–‍6	Diamondbacks, 5‍–‍2	Dodgers, 4‍–‍2	Dodgers; 14‍–‍11	

2000s (Dodgers, 96–83)

Season	Season series		at Arizona Diamondbacks	at Los Angeles Dodgers	Overall series	Notes
2000	Diamondbacks	7‍–‍6	Diamondbacks, 5‍–‍1	Dodgers, 5‍–‍2	Dodgers; 20‍–‍18	
2001	Diamondbacks	10‍–‍9	Tie, 5‍–‍5	Diamondbacks, 5‍–‍4	Dodgers; 29‍–‍28	MLB changed to an unbalanced schedule in 2001, resulting in 18–19 meetings per year. Diamondbacks win 2001 World Series
2002	Dodgers	10‍–‍9	Dodgers, 5‍–‍4	Tie, 5‍–‍5	Dodgers; 39‍–‍37	
2003	Diamondbacks	10‍–‍9	Tie, 5‍–‍5	Diamondbacks, 5‍–‍4	Dodgers; 48‍–‍47	
2004	Dodgers	16‍–‍3	Dodgers, 8‍–‍2	Dodgers, 8‍–‍1	Dodgers; 64‍–‍50	Dodgers take a 49–48 lead on May 29 in the series, a lead they would never relinquish.
2005	Diamondbacks	13‍–‍5	Diamondbacks, 5‍–‍4	Diamondbacks, 8‍–‍1	Dodgers; 69‍–‍63	
2006	Dodgers	10‍–‍8	Diamondbacks, 6‍–‍3	Dodgers, 7‍–‍2	Dodgers; 79‍–‍71	
2007	Dodgers	10‍–‍8	Dodgers, 6‍–‍3	Diamondbacks, 5‍–‍4	Dodgers; 89‍–‍79	
2008	Dodgers	10‍–‍8	Diamondbacks, 5‍–‍4	Dodgers, 6‍–‍3	Dodgers; 99‍–‍87	
2009	Dodgers	11‍–‍7	Dodgers, 5‍–‍4	Dodgers, 6‍–‍3	Dodgers; 110‍–‍94	

2010s (Dodgers, 106–84)

Season	Season series		at Arizona Diamondbacks	at Los Angeles Dodgers	Overall series	Notes
2010	Dodgers	13‍–‍5	Dodgers, 6‍–‍3	Dodgers, 7‍–‍2	Dodgers; 123‍–‍99	
2011	Diamondbacks	10‍–‍8	Dodgers, 5‍–‍4	Diamondbacks, 6‍–‍3	Dodgers; 131‍–‍109	
2012	Diamondbacks	12‍–‍6	Diamondbacks, 6‍–‍3	Diamondbacks, 6‍–‍3	Dodgers; 137‍–‍121	
2013	Diamondbacks	10‍–‍9	Dodgers, 6‍–‍4	Diamondbacks, 6‍–‍3	Dodgers; 146‍–‍131	Both AL and NL having balanced teams leads to a balanced schedule of 19 games per season.
2014	Dodgers	15‍–‍4	Dodgers, 8‍–‍2	Dodgers, 7‍–‍2	Dodgers; 161‍–‍135	
2015	Dodgers	13‍–‍6	Dodgers, 5‍–‍4	Dodgers, 8‍–‍2	Dodgers; 174‍–‍141	
2016	Dodgers	12‍–‍7	Tie, 5‍–‍5	Dodgers, 7‍–‍2	Dodgers; 186‍–‍148	
2017	Diamondbacks	11‍–‍8	Diamondbacks, 6‍–‍3	Tie, 5‍–‍5	Dodgers; 194‍–‍159	Dodgers lose 2017 World Series
2017 NLDS	Dodgers	3‍–‍0	Dodgers, 1‍–‍0	Dodgers, 2‍–‍0	Dodgers; 197‍–‍159	First postseason meeting between the two clubs.
2018	Diamondbacks	11‍–‍8	Diamondbacks, 7‍–‍3	Dodgers, 5‍–‍4	Dodgers; 205‍–‍170	Dodgers lose 2018 World Series
2019	Dodgers	11‍–‍8	Diamondbacks, 6‍–‍4	Dodgers, 7‍–‍2	Dodgers; 216‍–‍178	

2020s (Dodgers, 66–37)

Season	Season series		at Arizona Diamondbacks	at Los Angeles Dodgers	Overall series	Notes
2020	Dodgers	8‍–‍2	Dodgers, 5‍–‍2	Dodgers, 3‍–‍0	Dodgers; 224‍–‍180	Season shortened to 60 games (with 10 meetings) due to COVID-19 pandemic Dodgers win 2020 World Series.
2021	Dodgers	16‍–‍3	Dodgers, 7‍–‍2	Dodgers, 9‍–‍1	Dodgers; 240‍–‍183	
2022	Dodgers	14‍–‍5	Dodgers, 7‍–‍3	Dodgers, 7‍–‍2	Dodgers; 254‍–‍188	
2023	Dodgers	8‍–‍5	Tie, 3‍–‍3	Dodgers, 5‍–‍2	Dodgers; 262‍–‍193	New schedule structure started this season to allow every team to play one series against every interleague team. Shortening meetings from 19 to 13 games.
2023 NLDS	Diamondbacks	3‍–‍0	Diamondbacks, 1‍–‍0	Diamondbacks, 2‍–‍0	Dodgers; 262‍–‍196	Second postseason meeting. In a reversal from the 2017 NLDS, Diamondbacks sweep Dodgers, marking the first time Dodgers have been swept in a playoff series since the 2006 NLDS. Diamondbacks go on to lose 2023 World Series.
2024	Dodgers	7‍–‍6	Dodgers, 5‍–‍2	Diamondbacks, 4‍–‍2	Dodgers; 269‍–‍202	Dodgers win 2024 World Series
2025	Dodgers	7‍–‍6	Dodgers, 4‍–‍3	Tie, 3‍–‍3	Dodgers; 276‍–‍208	Dodgers win 2025 World Series
2026	Diamondbacks	7‍–‍6	Diamondbacks, 4‍–‍3	Tie, 3‍–‍3	Dodgers; 282‍–‍215	

Summary of Results

Season	Season series		at Arizona Diamondbacks	at Los Angeles Dodgers	Notes
Regular season games	Dodgers	279‍–‍212	Dodgers, 134‍–‍117	Dodgers, 145‍–‍95	
Postseason games	Tie	3‍–‍3	Tie, 1‍–‍1	Tie, 2‍–‍2	
Postseason series	Tie	1‍–‍1	N/A	N/A	NLDS: 2017, 2023
Regular and postseason	Dodgers	282‍–‍215	Dodgers, 135‍–‍118	Dodgers, 147‍–‍97	

== Players who have played on both teams ==
Name	Position(s)	Diamondbacks' tenure	Dodgers' tenure
Craig Counsell	Infielder	2000–2003	1999
Kirk Gibson	Manager/Outfielder	2007–2014 (as manager)	1988–1990 (as player)
Luis Gonzalez	Outfielder	1999–2006	2007
Shawn Green	Outfielder	2005–2006	2000–2004
Zack Greinke	Pitcher	2016–2019	2013–2015
Derrick Hall	Executive	2004–Present	1992–2004
Dan Haren	Pitcher	2008–2010	2014
Daniel Hudson	Pitcher	2010–2012, 2014–2016	2018, 2022–2024
Orlando Hudson	Second baseman	2006–2008	2009
J. D. Martinez	Outfielder/Designated hitter	2017	2023
Mike Morgan	Pitcher	2000–2002	1989–1991
Joc Pederson	Outfielder/Designated hitter	2024	2014–2020
David Peralta	Outfielder	2014–2022	2023
A. J. Pollock	Outfielder	2012–2018	2019–2021
Alek Thomas	Outfielder	2022–2026	2026

== See also ==
- Lakers–Suns rivalry
- Cardinals–Rams rivalry
