= 2023 Major League Baseball postseason =

2023 Major League Baseball playoffs

Tournament details
- Dates: October 3 – November 1, 2023
- Teams: 12

Final positions
- Champions: Texas Rangers (1st title)
- Runners-up: Arizona Diamondbacks

Tournament statistics
- Most HRs: Adolis García (TEX) (8)
- Most SBs: Christian Walker (ARI) (6)
- Most Ks (as pitcher): Nathan Eovaldi (TEX) (41)

Awards
- MVP: Corey Seager (TEX)

The 2023 Major League Baseball postseason was the playoff tournament of Major League Baseball (MLB) for the 2023 season. The winners of the Wild Card Series faced the two best division winners (seeds) in each league in the Division Series, and the victors advanced to the League Championship Series to determine the pennant winners who played each other in the World Series.

In the American League, the Baltimore Orioles and Texas Rangers returned to the postseason for the first time since 2016. The Houston Astros made their seventh straight postseason appearance and the eighth in the past nine seasons, marking the first time since 2015 that both Texas teams made the postseason. The Minnesota Twins made their fourth postseason appearance in the past seven seasons. The Toronto Blue Jays returned to the postseason for the third time in the past four seasons, and the Tampa Bay Rays returned for the fifth consecutive season.

In the National League, the Los Angeles Dodgers clinched their eleventh straight postseason berth, which is currently the longest active streak in the majors and in professional sports. The Atlanta Braves clinched the best record in the majors and made their sixth straight postseason appearance. The Milwaukee Brewers returned to the postseason for the fifth time in the past six seasons. The Miami Marlins returned to the postseason for the second time in the past four seasons. The Philadelphia Phillies made their second straight postseason appearance, and the Arizona Diamondbacks returned for the first time since 2017.

All five of the teams with artificial turf in the major leagues reached the postseason: Miami, Arizona, Toronto, Tampa Bay, and Texas.

This was the first edition of the postseason in which the last four remaining teams in the LCS had 90 or fewer regular-season wins.

The postseason began on October 3 and ended on November 1, with the Rangers defeating the Diamondbacks in the 2023 World Series to clinch their first title in franchise history. The total postseason attendance was 1,775,625 across 41 games, averaging 43,308 per game.

== Teams ==
The three division winners in each league and the top three non-division winners in each league qualified for the playoffs. The top two division winners receive byes to the American League Division Series (ALDS) or National League Division Series (NLDS) while the other teams who qualify for the playoffs play in the wild card series.

American League Teams National League Teams

The following teams qualified for the postseason:

=== American League ===
1. Baltimore Orioles – 101–61, AL East champions
2. Houston Astros – 90–72, AL West champions (9–4 head-to-head vs. TEX)
3. Minnesota Twins – 87–75, AL Central champions
4. Tampa Bay Rays – 99–63
5. Texas Rangers – 90–72 (4–9 head-to-head vs. HOU)
6. Toronto Blue Jays – 89–73

=== National League ===
1. Atlanta Braves – 104–58, NL East champions
2. Los Angeles Dodgers – 100–62, NL West champions
3. Milwaukee Brewers – 92–70, NL Central champions
4. Philadelphia Phillies – 90–72
5. Miami Marlins – 84–78 (4–2 head-to-head vs. AZ)
6. Arizona Diamondbacks – 84–78 (2–4 head-to-head vs. MIA)

== Playoff bracket ==
Wild Card Series (ALWCS, NLWCS)
4	Tampa Bay	0
5	Texas	2
3	Minnesota	2
6	Toronto	0
4	Philadelphia	2
5	Miami	0
3	Milwaukee	0
6	Arizona	2

Division Series (ALDS, NLDS)
1	Baltimore	0
5	Texas	3
American League
2	Houston	3
3	Minnesota	1
1	Atlanta	1
4	Philadelphia	3
National League
2	LA Dodgers	0
6	Arizona	3

Championship Series (ALCS, NLCS)
5	Texas	4
2	Houston	3
4	Philadelphia	3
6	Arizona	4

World Series
AL5	Texas	4
NL6	Arizona	1

== American League Wild Card Series ==
=== (3) Minnesota Twins vs. (6) Toronto Blue Jays ===
Minnesota won the series, 2–0.

Game	Date	Score	Location	Time	Attendance
1	October 3	Toronto Blue Jays – 1, Minnesota Twins – 3	Target Field	2:40	38,450
2	October 4	Toronto Blue Jays – 0, Minnesota Twins – 2	Target Field	2:51	38,518

This was the second postseason meeting between the Blue Jays and Twins. They last met in the ALCS in 1991, which was won by the Twins in five games en route to a World Series title. Minnesota ended 21 years of futility, sweeping Toronto to win their first playoff series since 2002. It also marked the end of their long streak of playoff game losses, which stood at 18 consecutive losses, the longest in North American sports history.

The Twins' streak of 18 consecutive playoff game losses was ended in Game 1, as Royce Lewis hit two home runs in his first two at-bats to lead the Twins to a 3–1 victory. It was the Twins' first playoff game win since Game 1 of the ALDS in 2004 against the New York Yankees. In Game 2, Sonny Gray out-dueled the Blue Jays' José Berríos and Yusei Kikuchi as the Twins won in a 2–0 shutout to win their first playoff series in 21 years.

While the Blue Jays were the sixth seed, the series result was considered an upset as the Blue Jays (89–73) finished with a better record than the Twins (87–75). Toronto was awarded the sixth seed under the new playoff format, which guarantees division winners a top-3 seed.

=== (4) Tampa Bay Rays vs. (5) Texas Rangers ===
Texas won the series, 2–0.

Game	Date	Score	Location	Time	Attendance
1	October 3	Texas Rangers – 4, Tampa Bay Rays – 0	Tropicana Field	2:41	19,704
2	October 4	Texas Rangers – 7, Tampa Bay Rays – 1	Tropicana Field	2:39	20,198

This was the third postseason meeting between the Rays and Rangers. The previous two meetings (2010 and 2011) were won by the Rangers. The Rangers swept the Rays to advance to the ALDS for the first time since 2016.

The Rangers held the Rays to one run scored in the series. Jordan Montgomery pitched seven shutout innings as the Rangers took Game 1 by a 4–0 score. Game 1 was notable for several stats – the Rays committed four errors, setting a single-game playoff franchise record and the most in a postseason game since the New York Yankees committed four errors in Game 4 of the 2019 ALCS. It was also notable for the record low attendance at Tropicana Field, as there was only 19,704 in attendance – the lowest attended postseason game (non-COVID-19 year) since Game 7 of the 1919 World Series. Nathan Eovaldi pitched a solid 6 2/3 innings in Game 2 as the Rangers blew out the Rays to complete the sweep and advance.

With the win, the Rangers improved their postseason record against the Rays to 3–0. This was the first playoff series won by the Rangers since they won the American League pennant in 2011.

== National League Wild Card Series ==
=== (3) Milwaukee Brewers vs. (6) Arizona Diamondbacks ===
Arizona won the series, 2–0.

Game	Date	Score	Location	Time	Attendance
1	October 3	Arizona Diamondbacks – 6, Milwaukee Brewers – 3	American Family Field	3:36	40,892
2	October 4	Arizona Diamondbacks – 5, Milwaukee Brewers – 2	American Family Field	2:58	41,166

This was the second postseason meeting between the Brewers and Diamondbacks. They previously met in the NLDS in 2011, which was won by the Brewers in five games. The Diamondbacks upset the Brewers in a sweep, returning to the NLDS for the first time since 2017.

The Diamondbacks stunned the Brewers with a come-from-behind victory in Game 1 – the Brewers led 3–0 after the first two innings, until Arizona's Corbin Carroll, Ketel Marte, and Gabriel Moreno all hit home runs across the top of the third and fourth innings to put the Diamondbacks in the lead for good. In Game 2, the Brewers again jumped out to an early lead and had a no-hit bid going into the top of the fifth, until Arizona's Alek Thomas hit a solo home run to end it. Then the Diamondbacks rallied to win again, as Carroll doubled and Marte hit a two-RBI single to put Arizona in the lead, and then a wild pitch and then a blooper scored the next two runs.

=== (4) Philadelphia Phillies vs. (5) Miami Marlins ===
Philadelphia won the series, 2–0.

Game	Date	Score	Location	Time	Attendance
1	October 3	Miami Marlins – 1, Philadelphia Phillies – 4	Citizens Bank Park	2:46	45,662
2	October 4	Miami Marlins – 1, Philadelphia Phillies – 7	Citizens Bank Park	2:36	45,738

The Phillies swept the Marlins to advance to the NLDS for the second year in a row.

The Phillies’ pitching staff held the Marlins’ offense to one run scored in both games. Zack Wheeler gave up one run and struck out eight Marlins over 6 2/3 strong innings as the Phillies won 4–1 in Game 1. Aaron Nola pitched seven strong innings in Game 2 as the Phillies blew out the Marlins, capped off by Bryson Stott's grand slam in the bottom of the sixth.

== American League Division Series ==
=== (1) Baltimore Orioles vs. (5) Texas Rangers ===
Texas won the series, 3–0.

Game	Date	Score	Location	Time	Attendance
1	October 7	Texas Rangers – 3, Baltimore Orioles – 2	Oriole Park at Camden Yards	3:09 (1:12 delay)	46,450
2	October 8	Texas Rangers – 11, Baltimore Orioles – 8	Oriole Park at Camden Yards	3:45	46,475
3	October 10	Baltimore Orioles – 1, Texas Rangers – 7	Globe Life Field	2:48	40,861

This was the second postseason meeting between the Orioles and Rangers. They last met in the inaugural AL Wild Card game in 2012, which was won by the Orioles. The Rangers upset the heavily favored Orioles in a sweep, returning to the ALCS for the first time since 2011.

The Rangers held off a late push by the Orioles to take Game 1 on the road, capped off by Josh Jung's solo home run in the top of the sixth. Game 2 was an offensive slugfest which the Rangers won 11–8, in part thanks to a third-inning grand slam hit by Mitch Garver. Nathan Eovaldi pitched seven solid innings in Game 3 as the Rangers blew out the Orioles by a 7–1 score to complete the sweep.

=== (2) Houston Astros vs. (3) Minnesota Twins ===
Houston won the series, 3–1.

Game	Date	Score	Location	Time	Attendance
1	October 7	Minnesota Twins – 4, Houston Astros – 6	Minute Maid Park	2:58	43,024
2	October 8	Minnesota Twins – 6, Houston Astros – 2	Minute Maid Park	3:09	43,017
3	October 10	Houston Astros – 9, Minnesota Twins – 1	Target Field	3:10	41,017
4	October 11	Houston Astros – 3, Minnesota Twins – 2	Target Field	2:38	40,977

This was the second postseason meeting between the Astros and Twins. They last met in the Wild Card round in 2020, which was won by the Astros in a two-game sweep. The Astros once again defeated the Twins, this time in four games, to return to the ALCS for the seventh year in a row.

The Astros held on to win as their bullpen held off a late rally by the Twins. Game 1 was notable for Justin Verlander's six shutout innings pitched for the sixth scoreless start of his postseason career, tying Madison Bumgarner and Tom Glavine for most all-time. In Game 2, Pablo López pitched seven solid innings for the Twins, as they jumped out to a big lead early and didn't relinquish it, evening the series headed to Minneapolis. Game 2 marked the end of the Astros' 12-game home winning streak in the ALDS, and it was also their first loss in Game 2 of the LDS since the second game of the 2015 ALDS against the Kansas City Royals. Cristian Javier pitched five scoreless innings in Game 3 as the Astros blew out the Twins to regain the series lead. In Game 4, the Astros held off a late rally by the Twins to win by a 3–2 score and return to the ALCS.

This marked the seventh consecutive loss for the Twins in the ALDS, as they previously lost in 2003, 2004, 2006, 2009, 2010, and 2019. Their most recent (and only) ALDS series win came in 2002, where they defeated the Oakland Athletics in five games before falling in the ALCS to the eventual World Series champion Anaheim Angels.

== National League Division Series ==
=== (1) Atlanta Braves vs. (4) Philadelphia Phillies ===
Philadelphia won the series, 3–1.

Game	Date	Score	Location	Time	Attendance
1	October 7	Philadelphia Phillies – 3, Atlanta Braves – 0	Truist Park	3:03	43,689
2	October 9	Philadelphia Phillies – 4, Atlanta Braves – 5	Truist Park	3:08	43,898
3	October 11	Atlanta Braves – 2, Philadelphia Phillies – 10	Citizens Bank Park	3:19	45,798
4	October 12	Atlanta Braves – 1, Philadelphia Phillies – 3	Citizens Bank Park	3:08	45,831

This was the third postseason meeting between the Braves and Phillies. They previously met in the NLCS in 1993 and the NLDS in the previous year, both of which were won by the Phillies. Like last year’s matchup, the Phillies again defeated the Braves in four games to return to the NLCS for the second consecutive season.

The outcome of this series was nearly identical to the previous year's match. The Phillies stole Game 1 on the road in a 3–0 shutout. In Game 2, the Braves overcame a late deficit in the seventh and eighth innings to even the series, thanks to a pair of two-run home runs from Travis d'Arnaud and Austin Riley. However, when the series shifted to Philadelphia, things again got ugly for the Braves. The Phillies blew out the Braves in Game 3, thanks to multiple home runs from Nick Castellanos, Bryce Harper, Trea Turner, and Brandon Marsh. Castellanos and Turner both homered again for the Phillies in Game 4 as they held on to win by a 3–1 score.

With the win, the Phillies improved their postseason record against the Braves to 3–0.

=== (2) Los Angeles Dodgers vs. (6) Arizona Diamondbacks ===
Arizona won the series, 3–0.

Game	Date	Score	Location	Time	Attendance
1	October 7	Arizona Diamondbacks – 11, Los Angeles Dodgers – 2	Dodger Stadium	3:04	51,653
2	October 9	Arizona Diamondbacks – 4, Los Angeles Dodgers – 2	Dodger Stadium	3:11	51,449
3	October 11	Los Angeles Dodgers – 2, Arizona Diamondbacks – 4	Chase Field	2:50	48,175

This was the second postseason meeting in the history of the Diamondbacks–Dodgers rivalry, also known as the I-10 rivalry. They previously met in the NLDS in 2017, which was won by the Dodgers in a sweep before falling in the World Series. In a significant upset given their regular season win differential, the 84-win Diamondbacks swept the 100-win Dodgers, reaching the NLCS for the first time since 2007. This series was a reverse of the NLDS in 2017, where the Dodgers swept the Diamondbacks.

In Game 1, the Diamondbacks’ offense chased Clayton Kershaw from the mound early in a blowout win. Game 1 was the shortest start of Kershaw's career, as he recorded just one out. In Game 2, the Diamondbacks again jumped out to a big early lead and held off a late rally by the Dodgers to win 4–2, capped off by an insurance home run by Lourdes Gurriel Jr. in the top of the sixth. When the series shifted to Phoenix, the Diamondbacks once again jumped out to a 4–0 lead early, thanks to four solo home runs from Moreno, Geraldo Perdomo, Ketel Marte, and Christian Walker respectively. The 2023 Diamondbacks became the first team in postseason history to hit four home runs in a single inning. The Diamondbacks would hold on to win by a 4–2 score, completing an improbable upset.

MLB.com ranked the Diamondbacks’ sweep of the Dodgers as the sixth biggest upset in postseason history. The Dodgers became the eleventh 100+ win team to be swept in the postseason, just a day after the Orioles became the tenth.

== American League Championship Series ==
=== (2) Houston Astros vs. (5) Texas Rangers ===
Texas won the series, 4–3.

Game	Date	Score	Location	Time	Attendance
1	October 15	Texas Rangers – 2, Houston Astros – 0	Minute Maid Park	2:49	42,872
2	October 16	Texas Rangers – 5, Houston Astros – 4	Minute Maid Park	3:01	42,879
3	October 18	Houston Astros – 8, Texas Rangers – 5	Globe Life Field	3:05	42,368
4	October 19	Houston Astros – 10, Texas Rangers – 3	Globe Life Field	3:14	42,060
5	October 20	Houston Astros – 5, Texas Rangers – 4	Globe Life Field	3:14	41,519
6	October 22	Texas Rangers – 9, Houston Astros – 2	Minute Maid Park	3:07	42,638
7	October 23	Texas Rangers – 11, Houston Astros – 4	Minute Maid Park	3:20	42,814

This was the first postseason meeting in the history of the Lone Star Series, the first ever LCS to feature two teams from the same state, and the first seven-game postseason series between two teams from the same state since the 2002 World Series. This was the seventh straight ALCS appearance for the Astros, dating back to 2017. The Rangers defeated the defending World Series champion Astros in seven games to return to the World Series for the first time since 2011.

Jordan Montgomery and the Rangers' bullpen shut down the Astros offense in Game 1 as they prevailed in a 2–0 shutout. Game 2 would also go the Rangers' way as despite Yordan Alvarez's efforts to erase their lead, they would hold on by one run to take a 2–0 series lead back to Arlington. Things would then take a turn for the worse for the Rangers in Game 3. Max Scherzer had one of his worst postseason starts, as he gave up four runs across the second and third innings in an 8–5 Astros win. The Astros then blew out the Rangers in Game 4 to even the series at two. Game 4 was notable for being Jose Altuve's 100th career postseason game. In Game 5, the Rangers had a two-run lead going into the ninth, until Altuve hit a three-run home run that put the Astros ahead for good and gave them a 3–2 series lead headed back to Houston, putting the Astros one win away from a third straight World Series appearance. Game 5 would ultimately be Justin Verlander’s final postseason game. However, their lead would not hold going back home. Adolis García, Mitch Garver, and Jonah Heim all hit home runs in Game 6 as the Rangers blew out the Astros to force a seventh game, capped off by García's grand slam in the top of the ninth inning. In the Rangers' first-ever ALCS Game 7, García once again took center stage, as he along with Corey Seager and Nathaniel Lowe blew out the Astros again and secured the pennant. This was the Rangers’ first victory in a Game 7 in franchise history.

This was the second best-of-seven playoff series in Major League Baseball history (after the 2019 World Series) in which the visiting team won every game. The Astros were on the losing end in both series and notably, the Game 7 starting pitcher for the visiting teams on both occasions was Max Scherzer. The loss to the Rangers marked the end of the Astros’ streak of seven straight appearances in the ALCS, the second longest LCS appearance streak behind only the Atlanta Braves, who made eight straight appearances from 1991 to 1999.

With the win, the Rangers improved their record in the ALCS to 3–0, previously winning in 2010 and 2011. They also became the second fifth-seeded team in MLB history to reach the World Series, joining the 2014 San Francisco Giants, who were also managed by Bruce Bochy.

== National League Championship Series ==
=== (4) Philadelphia Phillies vs. (6) Arizona Diamondbacks ===
Arizona won the series, 4–3.

Game	Date	Score	Location	Time	Attendance
1	October 16	Arizona Diamondbacks – 3, Philadelphia Phillies – 5	Citizens Bank Park	2:42	45,396
2	October 17	Arizona Diamondbacks – 0, Philadelphia Phillies – 10	Citizens Bank Park	3:06	45,412
3	October 19	Philadelphia Phillies – 1, Arizona Diamondbacks – 2	Chase Field	2:49	47,075
4	October 20	Philadelphia Phillies – 5, Arizona Diamondbacks – 6	Chase Field	3:27	47,806
5	October 21	Philadelphia Phillies – 6, Arizona Diamondbacks – 1	Chase Field	2:52	47,897
6	October 23	Arizona Diamondbacks – 5, Philadelphia Phillies – 1	Citizens Bank Park	3:02	45,473
7	October 24	Arizona Diamondbacks – 4, Philadelphia Phillies – 2	Citizens Bank Park	3:13	45,397

This was the second straight NLCS to feature two wild-card teams. The Diamondbacks overcame a two-games-to-none series deficit to defeat the defending National League champion Phillies in seven games, returning to the World Series for the first time since 2001.

In Game 1, the Phillies chased Arizona starter Zac Gallen from the mound early, and held off a late rally by the Diamondbacks to win 5–3. The Phillies then blew out the Diamondbacks in Game 2 to take a 2–0 series lead headed to Phoenix. The Diamondbacks got on the board in the series in a 2–1 victory in Game 3, thanks to a walk-off single by Ketel Marte. Alek Thomas and Gabriel Moreno would help the Diamondbacks come from behind in the bottom of the eighth inning to even the series at two. However, the Phillies regained the series lead in Game 5 with a 6–1 victory as Zach Wheeler pitched seven solid innings, giving up only one earned run. Back in Philadelphia for Game 6, the Diamondbacks, thanks to consecutive home runs from Tommy Pham and Lourdes Gurriel Jr., as well as an RBI double from Evan Longoria, jumped out to a big lead early and didn't relinquish it, winning 5–1 to force a seventh game. In Game 7, the Phillies took an early lead thanks to an RBI double from Bryson Stott. Then, Corbin Carroll hit an RBI single to tie the game at two. It was followed by another RBI single from Moreno, which gave the Diamondbacks a lead they would not relinquish, as they won 4–2 to clinch the pennant.

The 2023 Diamondbacks’ 84 wins were the fewest of any pennant winner since the 2006 St. Louis Cardinals, who won the pennant and the World Series with only 83 wins, and were the fourth team to win a league pennant with 85 or fewer wins (1973 Mets, 1987 Twins, 2006 Cardinals).

== 2023 World Series ==
=== (AL5) Texas Rangers vs. (NL6) Arizona Diamondbacks ===
Texas won the series, 4–1.

Game	Date	Score	Location	Time	Attendance
1	October 27	Arizona Diamondbacks – 5, Texas Rangers – 6 (11)	Globe Life Field	4:02	42,472
2	October 28	Arizona Diamondbacks – 9, Texas Rangers – 1	Globe Life Field	2:59	42,500
3	October 30	Texas Rangers – 3, Arizona Diamondbacks – 1	Chase Field	2:51	48,517
4	October 31	Texas Rangers – 11, Arizona Diamondbacks – 7	Chase Field	3:18	48,388
5	November 1	Texas Rangers – 5, Arizona Diamondbacks – 0	Chase Field	2:54	48,511

This was the first World Series since 2016 to not feature the Houston Astros or Los Angeles Dodgers.

This was the third World Series to feature two Wild Card teams (2002, 2014), as well as the third World Series to feature two expansion teams (2015, 2019). It is also significant as this World Series featured both the oldest and youngest expansion teams in the league – the Rangers were added to the league in 1961 (as the second Washington Senators), while the Diamondbacks joined the league in 1998. The Rangers defeated the Diamondbacks in five games to win their first championship in franchise history, ending the longest championship drought among expansion teams in the MLB, and what was the second longest championship drought in the majors.

In Game 1, the Diamondbacks led 5–3 going into the bottom of the ninth, until Corey Seager hit a two-run home run to tie the game and send it to extra innings. Adolis García hit a walk-off solo home run in the bottom of the eleventh to win the game for the Rangers. Merrill Kelly pitched seven solid innings for the Diamondbacks in Game 2 as they blew out the Rangers to even the series headed to Phoenix. Game 2 was the first World Series road game won by the Diamondbacks, as they lost the three road games in the 2001 World Series before coming back to win the series in seven games. Marcus Semien’s RBI single and another two-run home run from Seager carried the Rangers to victory in Game 3 to regain the series lead. Game 4 was once again controlled by the Rangers, as they put up 10 runs across the second and third innings, with Seager, Semien, and Jonah Heim all hitting home runs. Despite the Diamondbacks cutting their lead to four in the bottom of the ninth, the Rangers won 11–7 to take a 3–1 series lead. Game 5 started out as a pitcher’s duel between Arizona’s Zac Gallen and Texas’ Nathan Eovaldi. Gallen pitched a no-hitter through six innings until it was broken up by a base hit from Seager. Mitch Garver drove in Seager with an RBI single to put the Rangers in the lead for good, which was then capped off by a series-sealing two-run home run in the ninth by Semien off closer Paul Sewald.

The Rangers became the second fifth-seeded team to win the World Series, joining the 2014 San Francisco Giants, who were also managed by Bruce Bochy, as he became the first manager to win a World Series with a team he had previously defeated to win a World Series. It is also the second consecutive World Series won by a team from Texas after the Houston Astros did so the previous year. This was the first championship of the four major North American sports leagues won by a team from the Dallas-Fort Worth metroplex since 2011, when the NBA’s Dallas Mavericks won their first NBA championship.

== Broadcasting ==
=== Television coverage ===
==== United States ====
Coverage of the four Wild Card Series was produced by ESPN. ABC aired the Texas–Tampa Bay series, ESPN televised both the Toronto–Minnesota and Miami–Philadelphia series, and ESPN2 had the Arizona–Milwaukee series.

Both the National League Division Series and the National League Championship Series were on TBS. TruTV simulcasted all games in the NLDS and aired a Hispanic focused alternative telecast of the NLCS called Peloteros.

Fox Sports had coverage of the American League Division Series and American League Championship Series. The ALDS games primarily aired on FS1, with the Fox broadcast network televising Game 3 of both series. For the ALCS, Game 1 aired only on the Fox broadcast network, Games 2 and 7 were Fox/FS1 simulcasts, and Games 3 to 6 were only on FS1. And then The World Series aired on the Fox broadcast network for the 24th consecutive year.

Spanish language broadcasts was available on ESPN Deportes for ESPN's games, Fox Deportes for Fox Sports' games, and MLB Network for TBS's games.

==== Canada ====
Sportsnet broadcast the Minnesota–Toronto AL Wild Card Series in Canada.

=== Streaming ===
TBS's games were available on the streaming service Max's new Bleacher Report Sports Add-on tier which launched on October 5. ESPN, TBS and Fox's games were streamed on their respective apps.

=== Radio ===
ESPN Radio aired the entire Major League Baseball postseason.

=== Most watched playoff games ===
Rank	Round	Date	Game	Away team	Score	Home team	Network	Viewers (millions)	TV rating
1	World Series	November 1	Game 5	Rangers	5–0	Diamondbacks	Fox	11.45	6.0
2	World Series	October 27	Game 1	Diamondbacks	5–6 (11)	Rangers	Fox	9.17	4.6
3	NLCS	October 24	Game 7	Diamondbacks	4–2	Phillies	TBS	8.89	4.7
4	World Series	October 31	Game 4	Rangers	11–7	Diamondbacks	Fox	8.48	4.5
5	World Series	October 28	Game 2	Diamondbacks	9–1	Rangers	Fox	8.15	4.0
6	World Series	October 30	Game 3	Rangers	3–1	Diamondbacks	Fox	8.13	4.2
7	ALCS	October 15	Game 1	Rangers	2–0	Astros	Fox	7.02	3.7
8	ALCS	October 23	Game 7	Rangers	11–4	Astros	Fox & FS1	6.77	3.5
9	NLCS	October 20	Game 4	Phillies	5–6	Diamondbacks	TBS	5.39	2.7
10	NLDS	October 12	Game 4	Braves	1–3	Phillies	TBS	5.34	2.8

*Note: All TBS figures on this page include Max streaming viewing.
