= 2023 National League Division Series =

American baseball games

Teams
Team (Wins)		Manager	Season
Philadelphia Phillies (3)		Rob Thomson	90–72 (.556), GB: 14
Atlanta Braves (1)		Brian Snitker	104–58 (.642), GA: 14
- Dates: October 7–12
- Television: TBS/TruTV/Max
- TV announcers: Brian Anderson, Jeff Francoeur, and Matt Winer
- Radio: ESPN
- Radio announcers: Jon Sciambi and Doug Glanville
- Umpires: Mark Carlson (crew chief), Ramon De Jesus, Chris Guccione, Ben May, Brian O'Nora, David Rackley

Teams
Team (Wins)		Manager	Season
Arizona Diamondbacks (3)		Torey Lovullo	84–78 (.519), GB: 16
Los Angeles Dodgers (0)		Dave Roberts	100–62 (.617), GA: 16
- Dates: October 7–11
- Television: TBS/TruTV/Max
- TV announcers: Bob Costas, Ron Darling, and Lauren Shehadi
- Radio: ESPN
- Radio announcers: Roxy Bernstein and Jessica Mendoza
- Umpires: Ryan Additon, Vic Carapazza, Will Little, Gabe Morales, Todd Tichenor (crew chief), Jim Wolf
- NLWC: Philadelphia Phillies over Miami Marlins (2–0); Arizona Diamondbacks over Milwaukee Brewers (2–0)

The 2023 National League Division Series (NLDS) were the two best-of-five playoff series in Major League Baseball’s (MLB) 2023 postseason to determine the participating teams of the 2023 National League Championship Series (NLCS). These matchups were:

- (1) Atlanta Braves (NL East champions) vs. (4) Philadelphia Phillies (Wild Card Series winner): Phillies won the series, 3–1.
- (2) Los Angeles Dodgers (NL West champions) vs. (6) Arizona Diamondbacks (Wild Card Series winner): Diamondbacks won the series, 3–0.

The team with the better regular season record (higher seed) of each series hosted Games 1, 2, and (if necessary) 5, while the lower seeded team hosted Game 3 and (if necessary) 4.

The Diamondbacks would go on to defeat the Phillies in seven games in the NLCS before falling to the American League champion Texas Rangers in five games in the World Series.

== Background ==
The top two division winners (first two seeds) are determined by regular season winning percentages. The final two teams are the winners of the National League Wild Card Series, played between the league's third through sixth-seeded teams.

The Atlanta Braves (104–58) clinched their sixth straight postseason appearance on September 10, the third longest active streak in MLB behind the Dodgers and Astros, clinched the National League East on September 13, a first-round bye on September 18, the best record in the NL on September 27, and the best overall record on September 28, giving them home-field advantage throughout the entire playoffs. They played against the Philadelphia Phillies (90–72), who clinched their second straight postseason appearance on September 26, and swept the Miami Marlins in the Wild Card Series. This was the third postseason meeting between the two teams, following the 1993 National League Championship Series and last year's National League Division Series, both of which the Phillies won. The Braves won the regular season series against the Phillies, 8–5, with seven of those meetings coming in September.

The Los Angeles Dodgers (100–62) clinched their eleventh straight postseason appearance and the National League West on September 16, which is the longest active playoff streaks in four major North American professional sports after the NHL's Pittsburgh Penguins missed the playoffs for the first time in sixteen years during the 2022–23 NHL season, and a first-round bye on September 23. They faced the sixth-seeded Arizona Diamondbacks (84–78), who clinched a postseason berth on September 30, and swept the National League Central champion and third-seeded Milwaukee Brewers in the Wild Card Series for their first division series appearance since 2017, which was also against the Dodgers. Los Angeles went 8–5 against Arizona in the regular season, with Arizona winning five of eight in March/April, and Los Angeles winning five straight in August. This was the second postseason match-up between the two division rivals, following the 2017 National League Division Series, in which Los Angeles swept.

== Matchups ==
=== Atlanta Braves vs. Philadelphia Phillies ===
Philadelphia won the series, 3–1.

Game	Date	Score	Location	Time	Attendance
1	October 7	Philadelphia Phillies – 3, Atlanta Braves – 0	Truist Park	3:03	43,689
2	October 9	Philadelphia Phillies – 4, Atlanta Braves – 5	Truist Park	3:08	43,898
3	October 11	Atlanta Braves – 2, Philadelphia Phillies – 10	Citizens Bank Park	3:19	45,798
4	October 12	Atlanta Braves – 1, Philadelphia Phillies – 3	Citizens Bank Park	3:08	45,831

=== Los Angeles Dodgers vs. Arizona Diamondbacks ===
Arizona won the series, 3–0.

Game	Date	Score	Location	Time	Attendance
1	October 7	Arizona Diamondbacks – 11, Los Angeles Dodgers – 2	Dodger Stadium	3:04	51,653
2	October 9	Arizona Diamondbacks – 4, Los Angeles Dodgers – 2	Dodger Stadium	3:11	51,449
3	October 11	Los Angeles Dodgers – 2, Arizona Diamondbacks – 4	Chase Field	2:50	48,175

== Atlanta vs. Philadelphia ==
This was the third postseason meeting between Atlanta and Philadelphia. They previously met in the 1993 NLCS and 2022 NLDS, both of which were won by Philadelphia.

=== Game 1 ===
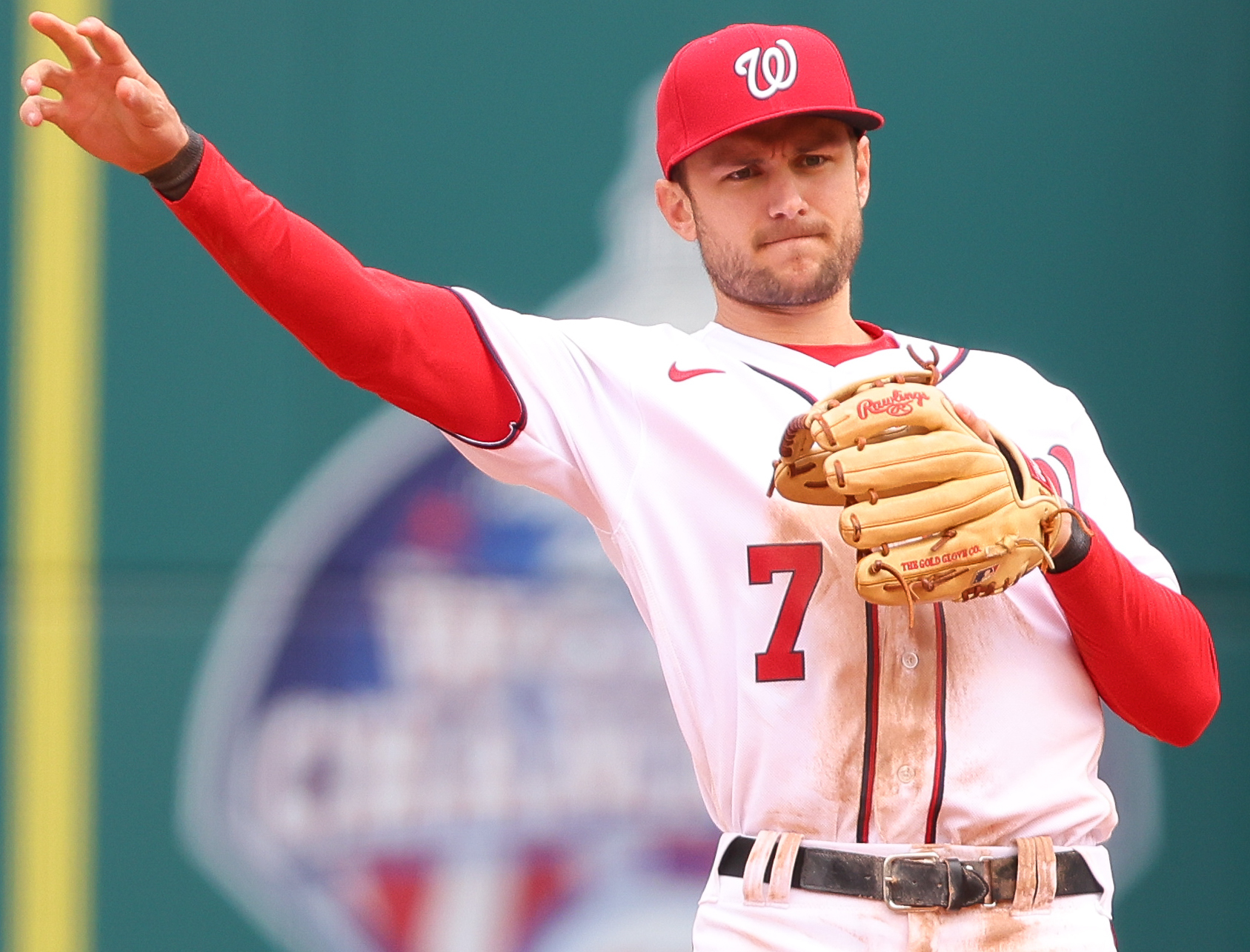
Trea Turner, pictured with the Washington Nationals, made a game-saving double play in Game 1.

October 7, 2023 6:07 pm (EDT) at Truist Park in Cumberland, Georgia 65 °F (18 °C), Clear
Team	1	2	3	4	5	6	7	8	9	R	H	E
Philadelphia	0	0	0	1	0	1	0	1	0	3	6	0
Atlanta	0	0	0	0	0	0	0	0	0	0	5	2
WP: Jeff Hoffman (1–0) LP: Spencer Strider (0–1) Sv: Craig Kimbrel (1); Home runs: PHI: Bryce Harper (1); ATL: None; Attendance: 43,689; Boxscore

The Phillies broke a scoreless tie in their half of the fourth inning as Bryson Stott's single scored Bryce Harper. In the bottom of the inning, Jeff Hoffman struck out Michael Harris II to escape the bases-loaded jam with two outs. In the sixth inning, Harper homered off Spencer Strider on the first pitch of the at-bat to extend the lead to two. In the eighth inning, the Phillies loaded the bases and Trea Turner scored on catcher's interference during J. T. Realmuto's at-bat to give the Phillies a 3–0 lead. Atlanta managed one more threat in the bottom of the eighth inning with runners on first and third and one out, but Turner started a sparkling inning-ending double play off the bat of Ozzie Albies to end the threat. Former Braves closer Craig Kimbrel finished things out for the Phillies and gave them the first game of the best-of-five.

=== Game 2 ===
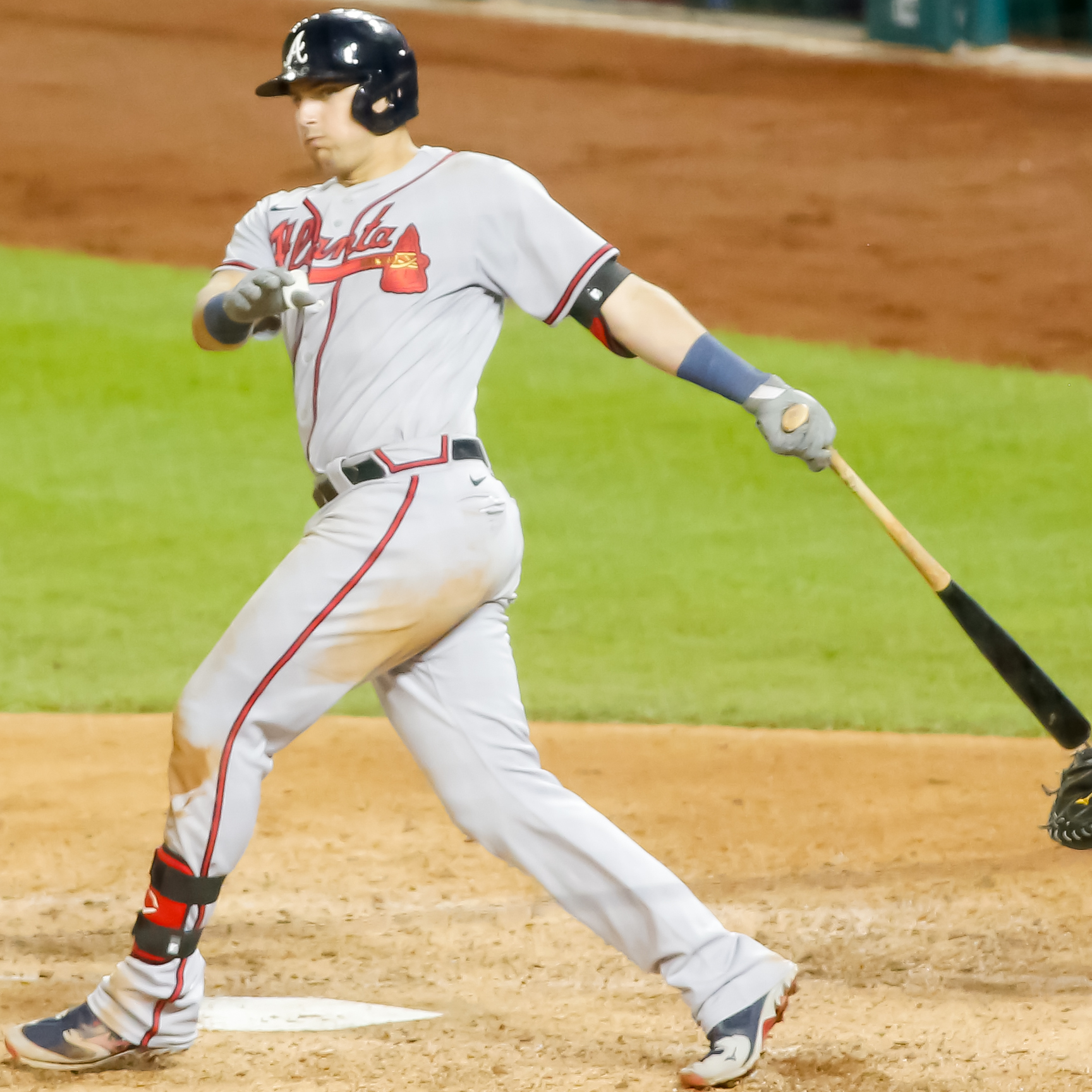
Austin Riley hit the go-ahead home run in Game 2.

October 9, 2023 6:07 pm (EDT) at Truist Park in Cumberland, Georgia 73 °F (23 °C), Clear
Team	1	2	3	4	5	6	7	8	9	R	H	E
Philadelphia	1	0	2	0	1	0	0	0	0	4	9	2
Atlanta	0	0	0	0	0	1	2	2	X	5	4	1
WP: A. J. Minter (1–0) LP: Jeff Hoffman (1–1) Sv: Raisel Iglesias (1); Home runs: PHI: J. T. Realmuto (1); ATL: Travis d'Arnaud (1), Austin Riley (1); Attendance: 43,898; Boxscore

Game 2 featured starters Zack Wheeler for the Phillies and Max Fried for the Braves. The Phillies broke through in their half of the first inning when Alec Bohm singled to center to plate Trea Turner. Two innings later, the Phillies lengthened the lead to 3–0, when J. T. Realmuto hit a two-run homer to right-center field to score Bryce Harper. The Phillies added a fourth run in the top of the fifth inning when Nick Castellanos scored on a Bryson Stott sacrifice fly. The Braves finally scored their first run of the series in the bottom of the sixth when Ronald Acuña Jr. scored on a fielding error by Turner after a single by Ozzie Albies. After six innings of play, the Phillies led 4–1. In the bottom of the seventh inning, the Braves got closer after Travis d'Arnaud hit a two-run homer scoring Matt Olson. Heading to the home half of the eighth and trailing 4–3, Austin Riley hit a two-run homer, on a full count, that scored Acuña, giving the Braves their first lead of the game at 5–4. In the top of the ninth, after A. J. Minter walked Harper, closer Raisel Iglesias entered the game. After Realmuto flied out to center for the first out, Castellanos drove the ball to right-center field, and Michael Harris II made a leaping catch near the wall for the second out. The throw came into the infield and Riley was able to grab the loose ball and fire to first to double-up Harper, ending the game. This was the first 8-5-3 double play in postseason history. With the victory, the Braves evened the series as the series shifted to Philadelphia.

=== Game 3 ===
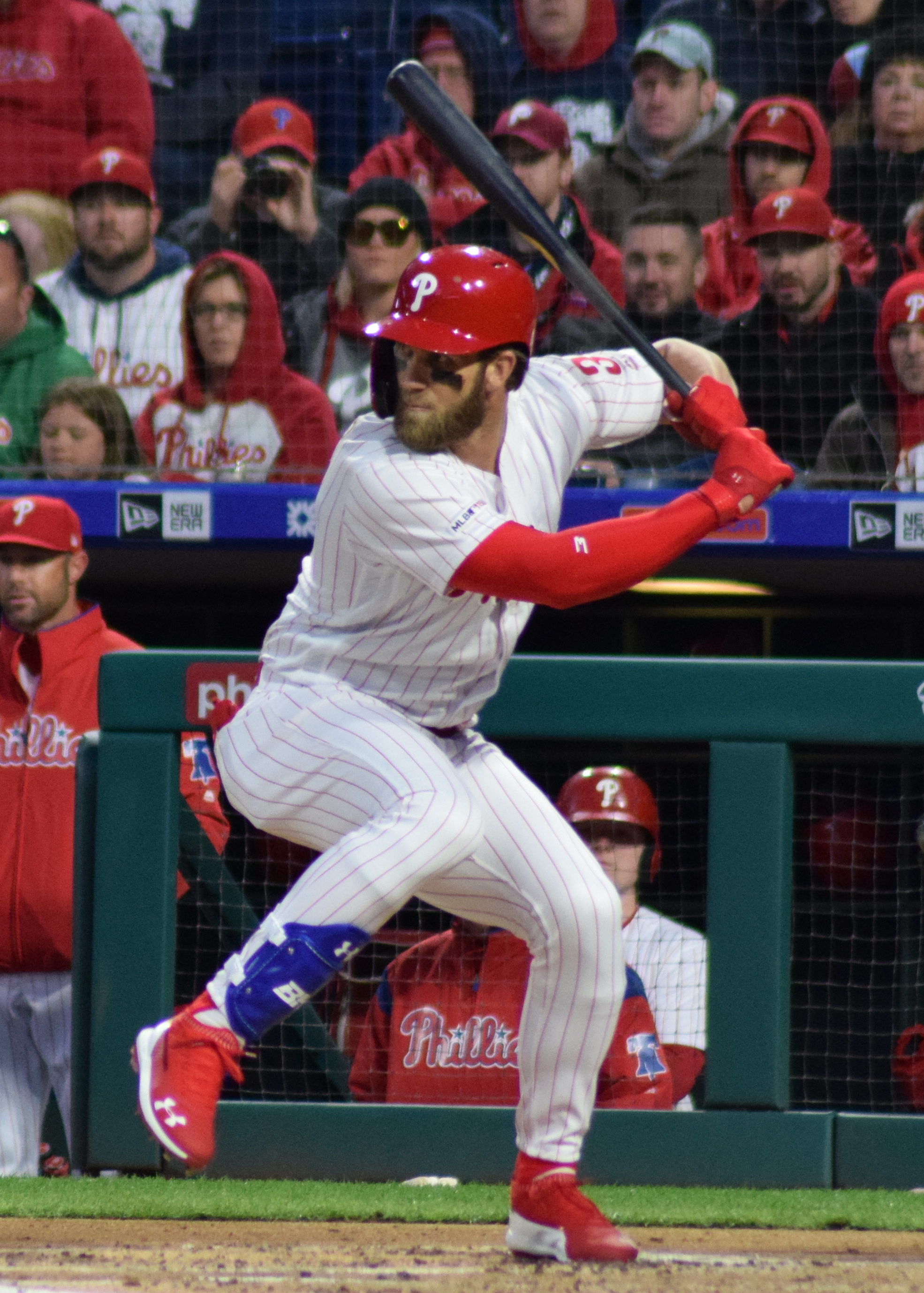
Bryce Harper homered twice in Game 3.

October 11, 2023 5:07 pm (EDT) at Citizens Bank Park in Philadelphia, Pennsylvania 70 °F (21 °C), Clear
Team	1	2	3	4	5	6	7	8	9	R	H	E
Atlanta	0	0	1	0	0	1	0	0	0	2	9	0
Philadelphia	0	0	6	0	1	1	0	2	X	10	11	0
WP: Aaron Nola (1–0) LP: Bryce Elder (0–1); Home runs: ATL: None; PHI: Nick Castellanos 2 (2), Bryce Harper 2 (3), Trea Turner (1), Brandon Marsh (1); Attendance: 45,798; Boxscore

The starters for Game 3 consisted of Bryce Elder for the Braves and Aaron Nola for the Phillies. The Braves got the scoring started in the third inning when Ozzie Albies singled home Ronald Acuña Jr.. Reminiscent of Game 3 the previous year, the series tilted in Philadelphia's favor with six runs in the bottom of the third inning. Nick Castellanos lead off the frame with a game-tying solo home run, later followed by Bryce Harper hitting a three-run shot to give the Phillies a 4–1 lead. After a pitching change, J. T. Realmuto drove home two on a double to left giving the Phillies a 6–1 lead after three innings. In the bottom of the fifth inning, Harper hit his second home run of the game off Brad Hand to extend the Phillies lead to 7–1. In the sixth, the Braves got closer after Orlando Arcia singled home Marcell Ozuna, to make the score 7–2. In the bottom half, Trea Turner's solo home run made it 8–2. The bottom of the eighth has the Phillies playing long ball again as Castellanos hits his second home run of the game and Brandon Marsh hits his first home run giving the Phillies a 10–2 lead. With the six home runs, the Phillies set a franchise postseason record and tied a Major League postseason record with most home runs in a single game.

=== Game 4 ===
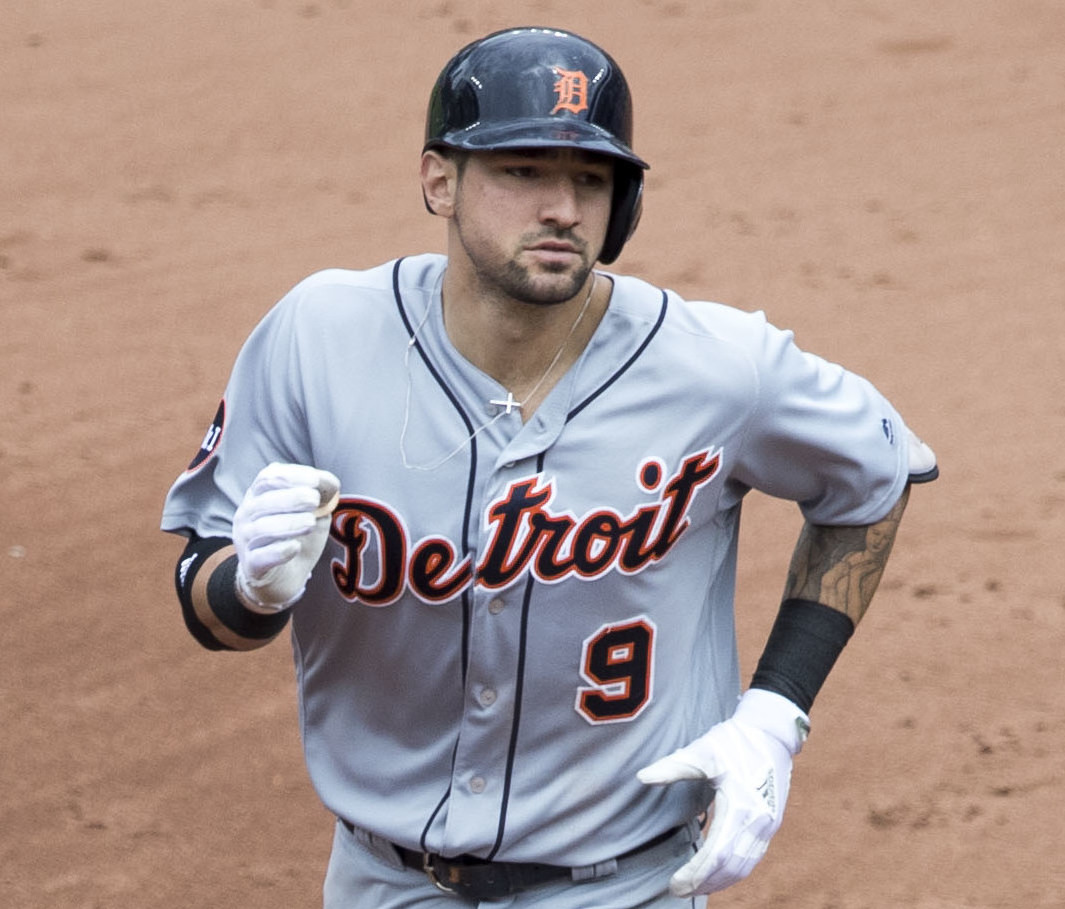
Nick Castellanos, pictured with the Detroit Tigers, homered twice for the second game in a row in Game 4.

October 12, 2023 8:07 pm (EDT) at Citizens Bank Park in Philadelphia, Pennsylvania 66 °F (19 °C), Party Cloudy
Team	1	2	3	4	5	6	7	8	9	R	H	E
Atlanta	0	0	0	1	0	0	0	0	0	1	5	0
Philadelphia	0	0	0	1	1	1	0	0	X	3	10	1
WP: Ranger Suárez (1–0) LP: Spencer Strider (0–2) Sv: Matt Strahm (1); Home runs: ATL: Austin Riley (2); PHI: Nick Castellanos 2 (4), Trea Turner (2); Attendance: 45,831; Boxscore

Game 4 consisted of Spencer Strider for the Braves and Ranger Suárez for the Phillies. The Braves started the scoring in the fourth inning when Austin Riley hit a solo home run. In the bottom of that inning, Nick Castellanos hit a home run off Spencer Strider to tie the game 1–1. In the bottom of the fifth inning, Trea Turner broke the tie with a solo home run to give the Phillies a 2–1 lead. In the bottom of the sixth inning, Castellanos hit his second home run of the game (and his fourth in two days) to extend the Phillies lead to 3–1. The Braves loaded the bases with two outs in the seventh, but Ronald Acuña Jr. hit a deep fly ball that was caught by Johan Rojas to end the inning. Matt Strahm relieved Gregory Soto in the top of the ninth inheriting runners on first and third and nobody out, Strahm induced a pop out from Kevin Pillar and a shallow fly out from Eddie Rosario on consecutive pitches. Now with two outs, Strahm ended the series by striking out pinch-hitter Vaughn Grissom to eliminate the Braves and send the Phillies to the NLCS for the second consecutive year.

=== Composite line score ===
2023 NLDS (3–1): Philadelphia Phillies beat Atlanta Braves

Team	1	2	3	4	5	6	7	8	9	R	H	E
Philadelphia Phillies	1	0	8	2	3	3	0	3	0	20	36	3
Atlanta Braves	0	0	1	1	0	2	2	2	0	8	23	3
Total attendance: 179,216 Average attendance: 44,804

== Los Angeles vs. Arizona ==
This was the second postseason matchup between Los Angeles and Arizona, following the 2017 NLDS, which was won by Los Angeles in a three-game sweep.

=== Game 1 ===
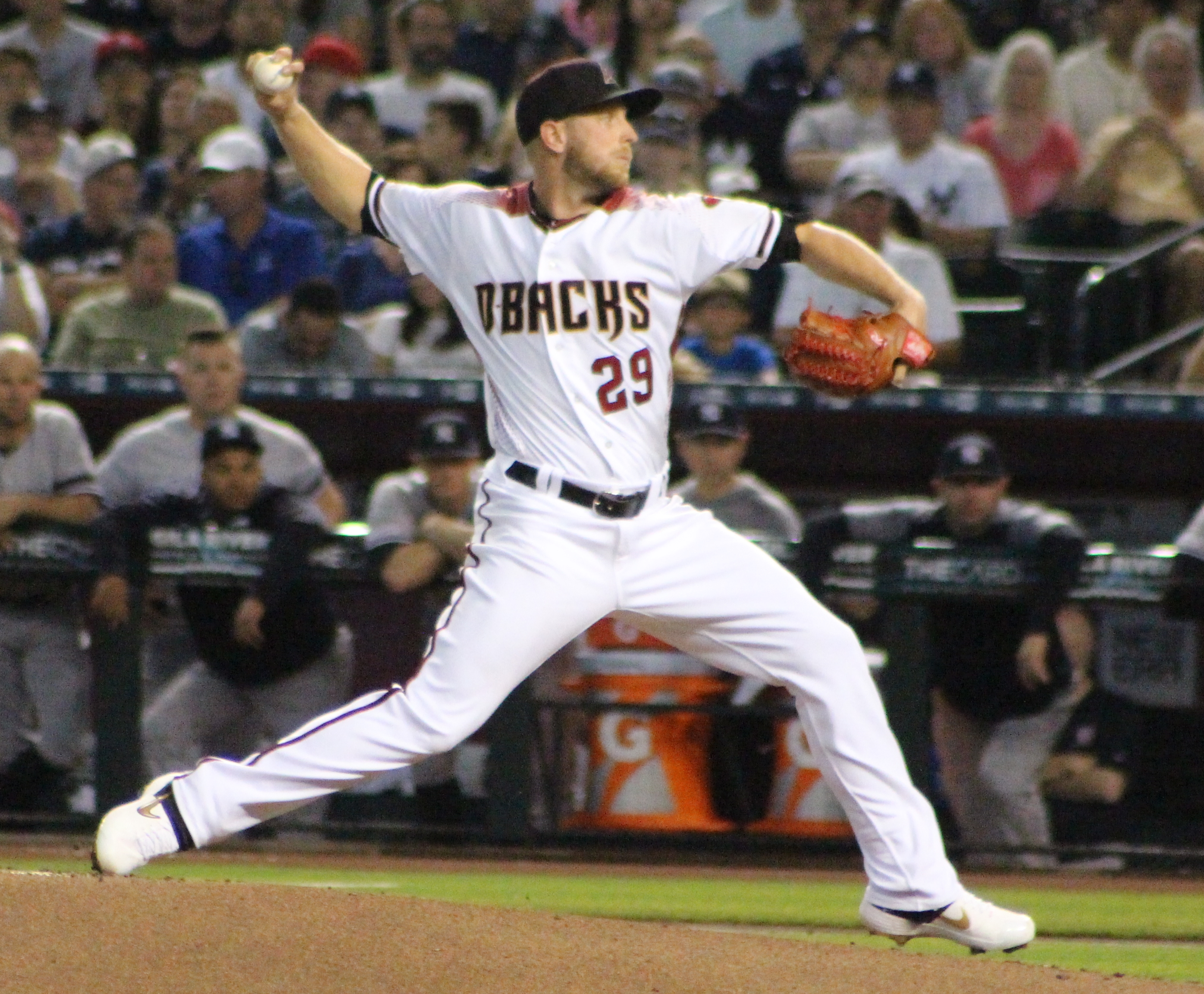
Merrill Kelly got the win in Game 1.

October 7, 2023 6:20 pm (PDT) at Dodger Stadium in Los Angeles, California 78 °F (26 °C), Clear
Team	1	2	3	4	5	6	7	8	9	R	H	E
Arizona	6	3	0	0	0	0	1	1	0	11	13	0
Los Angeles	0	0	0	0	0	0	0	2	0	2	4	0
WP: Merrill Kelly (1–0) LP: Clayton Kershaw (0–1); Home runs: AZ: Gabriel Moreno (1), Corbin Carroll (1), Alek Thomas (1), Tommy Pham (1); LAD: None; Attendance: 51,653; Boxscore

The Diamondbacks pounced on Clayton Kershaw early in the top of the first inning, as the first five batters for Arizona scored, highlighted by a three-run home run by Gabriel Moreno. The onslaught continued, as Evan Longoria's double scored Alek Thomas to extend the lead to 6–0 and chase Kershaw out of the game, having recorded just one out; marking the shortest start of his career. In the next inning, three more runs were scored by Corbin Carroll on a solo home run, an RBI double by Lourdes Gurriel Jr., and Longoria on a sacrifice fly. In the seventh, Alek Thomas homered off Michael Grove to extend the Diamondbacks lead to 10–0. In the eighth inning, Tommy Pham homered inside the right-field foul pole off Alex Vesia to make the score 11–0. In the bottom half, Will Smith hit a two-run triple to score Mookie Betts and Freddie Freeman, ending the shutout, but not the rout. The Diamondbacks took Game 1, 11–2, in the best-of-five series.

This was Merrill Kelly's first win against Los Angeles in 17 starts.

=== Game 2 ===
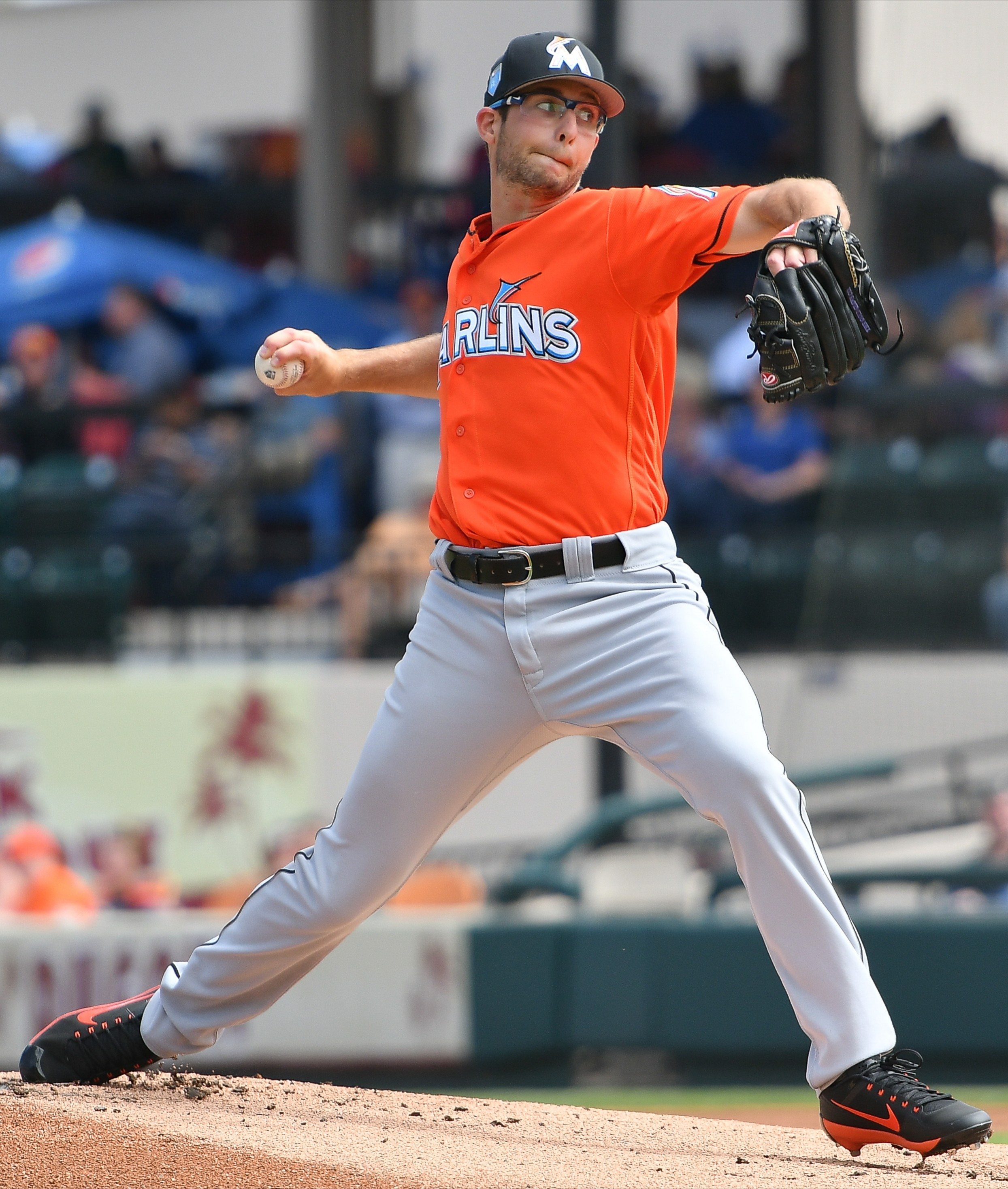
Zac Gallen, pictured with the Miami Marlins, got the win in Game 2.

October 9, 2023 6:07 pm (PDT) at Dodger Stadium in Los Angeles, California 70 °F (21 °C), Clear
Team	1	2	3	4	5	6	7	8	9	R	H	E
Arizona	3	0	0	0	0	1	0	0	0	4	8	1
Los Angeles	0	0	0	1	0	1	0	0	0	2	6	0
WP: Zac Gallen (1–0) LP: Bobby Miller (0–1) Sv: Paul Sewald (1); Home runs: AZ: Lourdes Gurriel Jr. (1); LAD: J. D. Martinez (1); Attendance: 51,449; Boxscore

The starters for Game 2 featured Zac Gallen for the Diamondbacks and Bobby Miller for the Dodgers. The Diamondbacks jumped on the Dodgers again in the first inning as they scored three times. Corbin Carroll scored on a sacrifice fly by Christian Walker, Ketel Marte scored on a ground out, and Tommy Pham scored on a single by Lourdes Gurriel Jr.. The Dodgers got on the scoreboard when J. D. Martinez hit a solo home run. The Diamondbacks extended their lead to 4–1 in the sixth when Gurriel Jr. hit a solo shot. The Dodgers got that run back in their half of the inning when Enrique Hernández drove home Max Muncy on an infield single. This was the closest that the Dodgers could get as they dropped the second game by a score of 4–2, giving the Diamondbacks a 2–0 lead in the series heading to Phoenix.

=== Game 3 ===
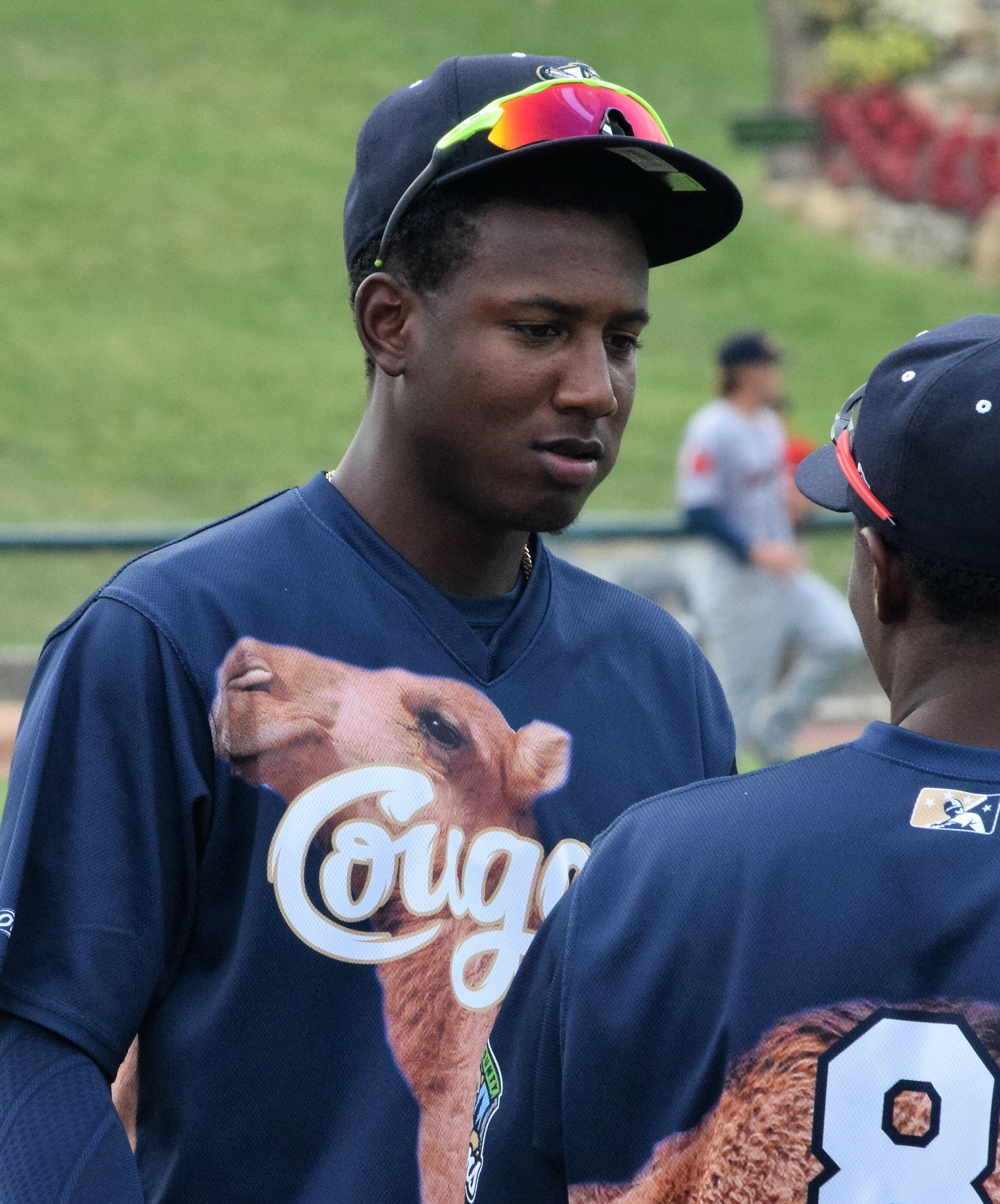
Geraldo Perdomo, pictured with the Kane County Cougars, hit the first of four home runs in the third inning of Game 3.

October 11, 2023 6:07 pm (MST) at Chase Field in Phoenix, Arizona 87 °F (31 °C) , Roof Open
Team	1	2	3	4	5	6	7	8	9	R	H	E
Los Angeles	0	0	0	0	0	0	2	0	0	2	7	1
Arizona	0	0	4	0	0	0	0	0	X	4	8	0
WP: Joe Mantiply (1–0) LP: Lance Lynn (0–1) Sv: Paul Sewald (2); Home runs: LAD: None; AZ: Geraldo Perdomo (1), Ketel Marte (1), Christian Walker (1), Gabriel Moreno (2); Attendance: 48,175; Boxscore

The starters for Game 3 featured Lance Lynn for the Dodgers and Brandon Pfaadt for the Diamondbacks. The game was held scoreless for the first two innings, which was the first time that Arizona was not leading in the whole series. The Diamondbacks pounced on Lynn in the bottom of the third, as Arizona unleashed four home runs from Geraldo Perdomo, Ketel Marte, Christian Walker, and Gabriel Moreno, becoming the first team in postseason history to hit four homers in a single inning. The Dodgers got their first run of the game when Chris Taylor singled home Max Muncy in the top of the seventh inning. Later, the Dodgers made the score 4–2 when Enrique Hernandez singled home Will Smith. Paul Sewald closed out the upset victory, and series sweep of the 100-win Dodgers, in the ninth to help the Diamondbacks advance to the NLCS for the first time since 2007. This was the third straight season that the Dodgers lost a postseason series to a team with 15 or more losses than them in the regular season after the 2022 NLDS and the 2021 NLCS.

MLB.com ranked the Diamondbacks’ sweep of the Dodgers as the sixth biggest upset in postseason history.

=== Composite line score ===
2023 NLDS (3–0): Arizona Diamondbacks beat Los Angeles Dodgers

Team	1	2	3	4	5	6	7	8	9	R	H	E
Arizona Diamondbacks	9	3	4	0	0	1	1	1	0	19	29	1
Los Angeles Dodgers	0	0	0	1	0	1	2	2	0	6	19	1
Total attendance: 151,277 Average attendance: 50,425

== See also ==
- 2023 American League Division Series
- Braves–Phillies rivalry
- Diamondbacks–Dodgers rivalry
