= 2023 National League Wild Card Series =

Teams
Team (Wins)		Manager	Season
Arizona Diamondbacks (2)		Torey Lovullo	84–78 (.519), GB: 16
Milwaukee Brewers (0)		Craig Counsell	92–70 (.568), GA: 9
- Dates: October 3–4
- Television: ESPN2
- TV announcers: Jon Sciambi, Doug Glanville, and Jesse Rogers
- Radio: ESPN
- Radio announcers: Roxy Bernstein and Gregg Olson
- Umpires: Sean Barber, Dan Bellino, Mike Estabrook, Alan Porter (crew chief), Mark Ripperger, Chris Segal

Teams
Team (Wins)		Manager	Season
Philadelphia Phillies (2)		Rob Thomson	90–72 (.556), GB: 14
Miami Marlins (0)		Skip Schumaker	84–78 (.519), GB: 20
- Dates: October 3–4
- Television: ESPN
- TV announcers: Karl Ravech, David Cone, Eduardo Pérez, and Buster Olney
- Radio: ESPN
- Radio announcers: Mike Couzens and Chris Burke
- Umpires: Jordan Baker, Doug Eddings, James Hoye (crew chief), Marvin Hudson, Edwin Moscoso, Stu Scheurwater

The 2023 National League Wild Card Series were the two best-of-three playoff series in Major League Baseball’s (MLB) 2023 postseason to determine the participating teams of the 2023 National League Division Series (NLDS). Both Wild Card Series began on October 3, with Game 2s scheduled for October 4. ESPN broadcast both Wild Card Series in the United States together with ESPN Radio.

These matchups are:

- (3) Milwaukee Brewers (NL Central champions) vs. (6) Arizona Diamondbacks (third wild card): Diamondbacks won the series, 2–0.
- (4) Philadelphia Phillies (first wild card) vs. (5) Miami Marlins (second wild card): Phillies won the series, 2–0.

== Background ==
Under the current playoff structure, there are two Wild Card Series in both the American League (AL) and National League (NL). The lowest-seeded division winner and three wild card teams in each league play in a best-of-three series after the end of the regular season. The winners of each league's wild card rounds advance to face the two best division winners in that league's Division Series.

The Milwaukee Brewers (92–70) clinched their first postseason appearance since 2021, and their fifth in six seasons on September 22 and the NL Central on September 26. Due to having the worst record of the three National League division winners, they are locked into the third seed. They played host to the sixth-seeded Arizona Diamondbacks (84–78), who clinched a postseason berth on September 30, for their first postseason appearance since 2017, and just the second since 2011. Arizona won the season series against Milwaukee, 4–2. Historically, this is the second postseason match-up between the two teams, following the 2011 National League Division Series, which was won by the Brewers in five games.

The Philadelphia Phillies (90–72), the defending National League champions, clinched their second straight postseason appearance on September 26 and also clinched the fourth-seed as the best non-division winner and home-field advantage for the wild card series. They played host to the fifth-seeded Miami Marlins (84–78), who clinched a postseason berth on September 30, their first since 2020. Miami won the season series against Philadelphia, 7–6, despite being outscored 64–55. This is the first postseason match-up between the NL East division rivals.

As the top two division winners (seeds by record), the Atlanta Braves (104–58) and Los Angeles Dodgers (100–62) earned a first-round bye and home-field advantage in the NLDS.

== Matchups ==
=== Milwaukee Brewers vs. Arizona Diamondbacks ===
Arizona won the series, 2–0.

Game	Date	Score	Location	Time	Attendance
1	October 3	Arizona Diamondbacks – 6, Milwaukee Brewers – 3	American Family Field	3:36	40,892
2	October 4	Arizona Diamondbacks – 5, Milwaukee Brewers – 2	American Family Field	2:58	41,166

=== Philadelphia Phillies vs. Miami Marlins ===
Philadelphia won the series, 2–0.

Game	Date	Score	Location	Time	Attendance
1	October 3	Miami Marlins – 1, Philadelphia Phillies – 4	Citizens Bank Park	2:46	45,662
2	October 4	Miami Marlins – 1, Philadelphia Phillies – 7	Citizens Bank Park	2:30	45,738

== Milwaukee vs. Arizona ==
This was the second postseason match-up between Milwaukee and Arizona, following the 2011 National League Division Series, which Milwaukee won in five games.

=== Game 1 ===
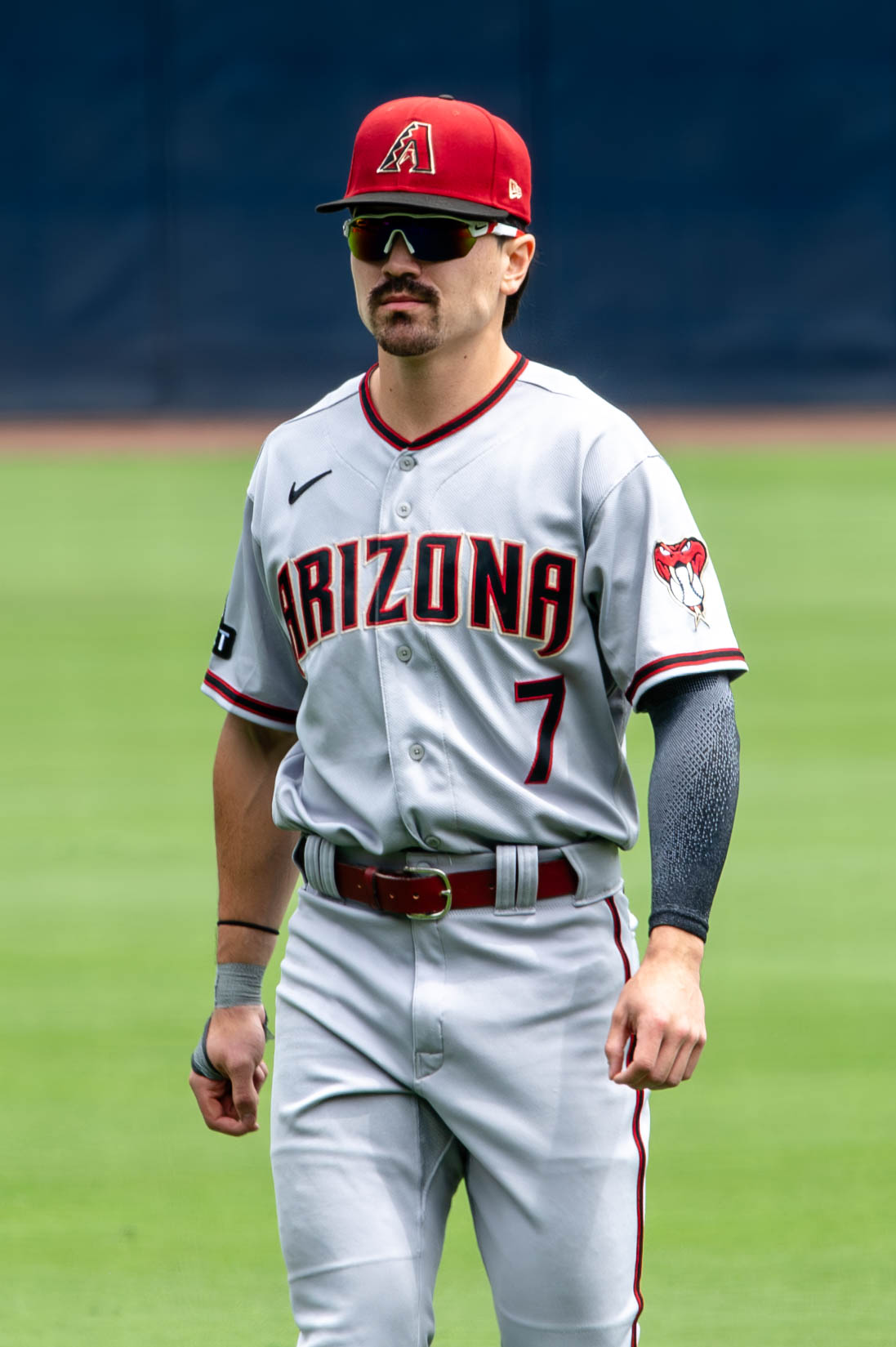
Corbin Carroll hit a two-run home run in the third inning of Game 1.

October 3, 2023 6:08 pm (CDT) at American Family Field in Milwaukee, Wisconsin 80 °F (27 °C), Clear
Team	1	2	3	4	5	6	7	8	9	R	H	E
Arizona	0	0	3	1	0	0	0	0	2	6	9	0
Milwaukee	1	2	0	0	0	0	0	0	0	3	12	0
WP: Joe Mantiply (1–0) LP: Corbin Burnes (0–1) Sv: Paul Sewald (1); Home runs: AZ: Corbin Carroll (1), Ketel Marte (1), Gabriel Moreno (1); MIL: Tyrone Taylor (1); Attendance: 40,892; Boxscore

Corbin Burnes started for Milwaukee, while rookie Brandon Pfaadt started for Arizona. The Brewers scored in the bottom of the first on a Carlos Santana RBI single that scored Christian Yelich. In the second, Tyrone Taylor hit a two-run home run off Pfaadt to give the Brewers a 3–0 lead. Arizona answered with a two-run home run from Corbin Carroll in the top of the third. With this homer, Carroll became the youngest-ever Diamondback to homer in the postseason. The next batter, Ketel Marte, hit a solo home run to tie the game at three. The Brewers loaded the bases in the bottom of the third but did not score. Gabriel Moreno hit a solo homer in the fourth to give Arizona a one-run lead. The Brewers loaded the bases with one out in the fifth, but third baseman Evan Longoria turned a double play to get the Diamondbacks out of the jam. Christian Walker added to Arizona's lead in the top of the ninth with a two-run double, making it 6–3. Paul Sewald earned the save for the Diamondbacks. This ended a seven-game road losing streak for Arizona in the postseason dating back to the 2007 NLCS.

=== Game 2 ===
October 4, 2023 6:08 pm (CDT) at American Family Field in Milwaukee, Wisconsin 73 °F (23 °C), Roof Closed
Team	1	2	3	4	5	6	7	8	9	R	H	E
Arizona	0	0	0	0	1	4	0	0	0	5	6	0
Milwaukee	2	0	0	0	0	0	0	0	0	2	8	0
WP: Zac Gallen (1–0) LP: Freddy Peralta (0–1) Sv: Paul Sewald (2); Home runs: AZ: Alek Thomas (1); MIL: None; Attendance: 41,166; Boxscore

Game 2 was déjà vu for Milwaukee as they scored two quick runs against Arizona's ace Zac Gallen in the first inning. Freddy Peralta was dealing early in Game 2. He struck out five through 3 1/3 innings and had a no-hitter going through four scoreless innings. Diamondbacks center fielder Alek Thomas homered to break up the no-no in the fifth. The Diamondbacks rallied for four runs in the sixth inning with Corbin Carroll's double making it a serious threat and Ketel Marte's two-RBI single giving Arizona the lead. A wild pitch and then a blooper with eyes scored the next two runs to give the Diamondbacks a 5–2 lead, which ended up being the final score.

With Milwaukee's defeat, the NL Central as a division moved to a combined 0–7 in postseason series since 2020. This was also Craig Counsell's last game as Brewers' manager, as he signed with the rival Chicago Cubs in the off-season.

=== Composite line score ===
2023 NLWC (2–0): Arizona Diamondbacks beat Milwaukee Brewers

Team	1	2	3	4	5	6	7	8	9	R	H	E
Arizona Diamondbacks	0	0	3	1	1	4	0	0	2	11	15	0
Milwaukee Brewers	3	2	0	0	0	0	0	0	0	5	20	0
Total attendance: 82,058 Average attendance: 41,029

== Philadelphia vs. Miami ==
This was the first postseason match-up between Philadelphia and Miami.

=== Game 1 ===
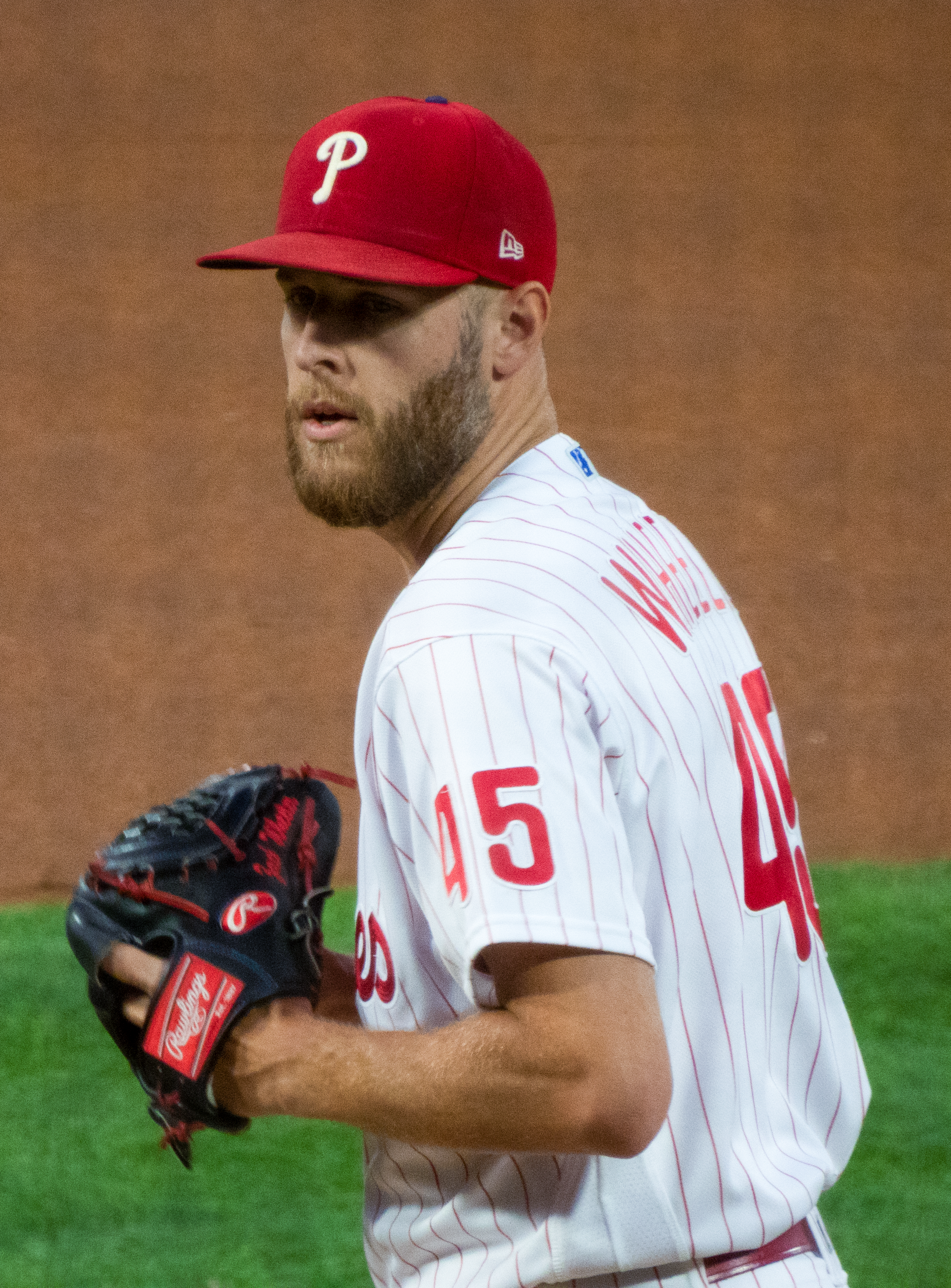
Zack Wheeler earned the win in Game 1.

October 3, 2023 8:09 pm (EDT) at Citizens Bank Park in Philadelphia, Pennsylvania 74 °F (23 °C), Clear
Team	1	2	3	4	5	6	7	8	9	R	H	E
Miami	0	0	0	0	0	0	1	0	0	1	7	0
Philadelphia	0	0	1	2	0	0	0	1	X	4	11	0
WP: Zack Wheeler (1–0) LP: Jesús Luzardo (0–1) Sv: Craig Kimbrel (1); Attendance: 45,662; Boxscore

Zack Wheeler started for the defending National League champion Phillies against Jesús Luzardo for the Marlins. After a scoreless first two innings, Alec Bohm broke the tie with an RBI double in the third inning. The Phillies tacked on two more in the fourth on back-to-back RBI singles from Bryson Stott and Cristian Pache to open up a 3–0 lead. Luzardo ended his night with three runs and eight hits given up to go along with five strikeouts over four innings. The Marlins got on the board in the seventh after an RBI single from Bryan De La Cruz chased Wheeler. José Alvarado came on in relief to strike out Yuli Gurriel to end the inning. Wheeler ended his night giving up one run and striking out eight batters over 6 2/3 strong innings. Philadelphia tacked on another run in the eighth on a Nick Castellanos RBI double before Craig Kimbrel shut the door in the ninth to give the Phillies a 1–0 lead in the series.

=== Game 2 ===
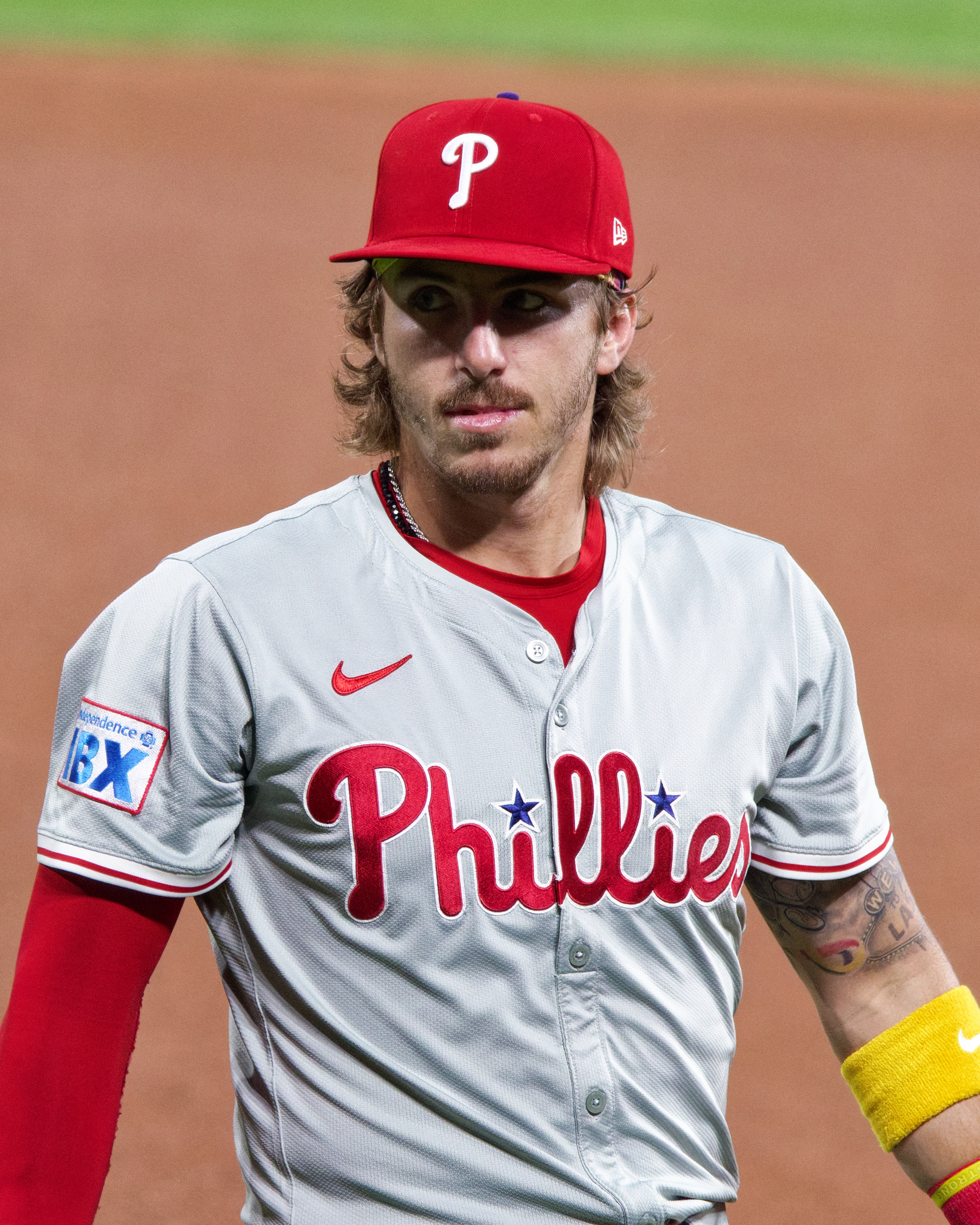
Bryson Stott hit a grand slam home run in the sixth inning of Game 2.

October 4, 2023 8:08 pm (EDT) at Citizens Bank Park in Philadelphia, Pennsylvania 72 °F (22 °C), Clear
Team	1	2	3	4	5	6	7	8	9	R	H	E
Miami	0	0	0	0	0	0	0	0	1	1	5	1
Philadelphia	0	0	2	1	0	4	0	0	X	7	7	0
WP: Aaron Nola (1–0) LP: Braxton Garrett (0–1); Home runs: MIA: None; PHI: J. T. Realmuto (1), Bryson Stott (1); Attendance: 45,738; Boxscore

Aaron Nola looked to send the Phillies to a rematch of the 2022 NLDS while Braxton Garrett toed the rubber hoping to keep the Marlins' playoff hopes alive. Nola ended a Marlins scoring threat in the third, throwing out Jon Berti who got caught attempting to steal third base. A Kyle Schwarber RBI double and Trea Turner RBI single started the scoring for the Phillies in the bottom half of the inning, with J. T. Realmuto tacking on another with a solo home run in the fourth. In the bottom of the sixth, Bryson Stott hit a grand slam off of Andrew Nardi to extend the Phillies' lead to 7–0. Nola finished his night after seven strong innings, scattering three hits, and striking out three. The Marlins put a run on the board in the ninth with a Josh Bell RBI single, but Gregory Soto slammed the door, striking out Jazz Chisholm Jr. on three pitches to send the Phillies to the NLDS.

=== Composite line score ===
2023 NLWC (2–0): Philadelphia Philllies beat Miami Marlins

Team	1	2	3	4	5	6	7	8	9	R	H	E
Miami Marlins	0	0	0	0	0	0	1	0	1	2	12	1
Philadelphia Phillies	0	0	3	3	0	4	0	1	0	11	18	0
Total attendance: 91,400 Average attendance: 45,700

== See also ==
- 2023 American League Wild Card Series
- Milwaukee Brewers reverse World Series curse
