= Gabriel Moreno =

Venezuelan baseball player (born 2000)

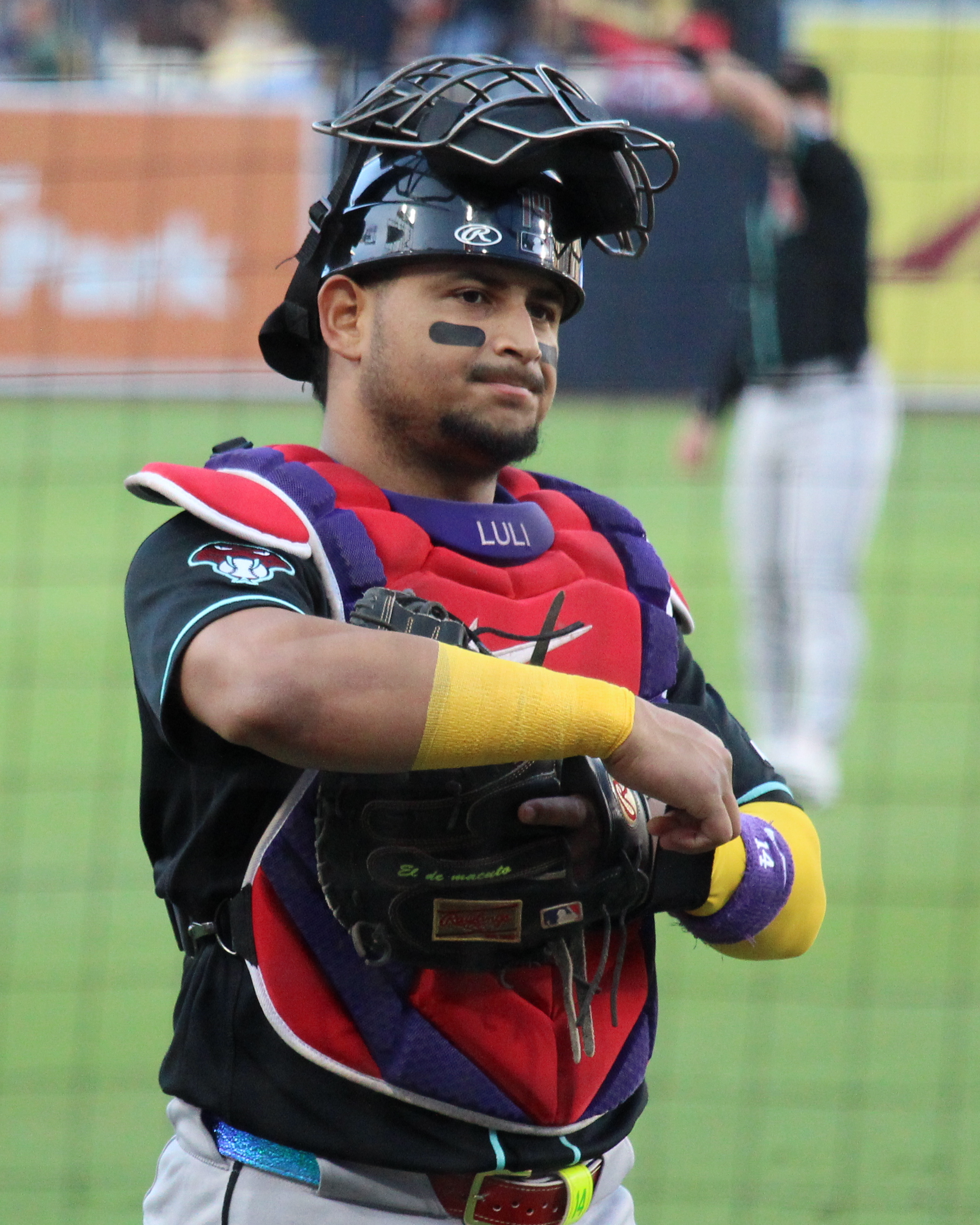
- Moreno with the Diamondbacks in 2026

Arizona Diamondbacks – No. 14
- Catcher
- Born: February 14, 2000 (age 26); Barquisimeto, Venezuela
- Bats: Right Throws: Right

MLB debut
- June 11, 2022, for the Toronto Blue Jays

MLB statistics (through 2026 season)
- Batting average: .291
- Home runs: 38
- Runs batted in: 225
- Stats at Baseball Reference

Teams
- Toronto Blue Jays (2022); Arizona Diamondbacks (2023–present)

Career highlights and awards
- All-MLB First Team (2026); 2× Gold Glove Award (2023, 2026); Silver Slugger Award (2026); NL batting champion (2026)

Gabriel José Moreno (born February 14, 2000) is a Venezuelan professional baseball catcher for the Arizona Diamondbacks of Major League Baseball (MLB). He made his MLB debut with the Toronto Blue Jays in 2022 before being traded to the Diamondbacks during the offseason. In his first season with Arizona, Moreno won a Gold Glove Award and aided in the team's first National League pennant since 2001. In 2026, he was the National League batting champion and won his second Gold Glove.

== Professional career ==
=== Toronto Blue Jays ===
Moreno signed with the Toronto Blue Jays as an international free agent on August 13, 2016. Moreno made his professional debut in 2017 with the Rookie-level Dominican Summer League Blue Jays. In 2018, Moreno split the year between the Rookie-level Gulf Coast League Blue Jays and the Rookie Advanced Bluefield Blue Jays, slashing a cumulative .359/.395/.575 with four home runs and 36 RBI. The following year, Moreno played for the Single-A Lansing Lugnuts, hitting .280/.337/.485 with career-highs in home runs (12), RBI (52), stolen bases (7), and walks (22).

Moreno did not play in a game in 2020 due to the cancellation of the minor league season because of the COVID-19 pandemic. The Blue Jays added him to their 40-man roster after the 2020 season.

Moreno was assigned to the Double-A New Hampshire Fisher Cats to begin the 2021 season, where he excelled, batting .373/.441/.651 with eight home runs and 45 RBI in 32 games. On July 3, 2021, Moreno underwent surgery on his right thumb after suffering a fracture. Moreno returned from the injury later in the season and was promoted to the Triple-A Buffalo Bisons. After the season, he played for the Mesa Solar Sox of the Arizona Fall League, where he hit .329 with a home run and 18 RBI in 22 games, as well as 18 games with the Cardenales de Lara of the Venezuelan Winter League.

In March 2022, Moreno participated in spring training with the Blue Jays. He began the 2022 season with Buffalo.

Moreno joined the Blue Jays in Detroit on June 9, 2022, following an injury sustained by catcher Danny Jansen, but was not activated until June 11, when he was added to the day's starting line-up at the catcher position and batting eighth in the order. He was slashing .324/.380/.404 in 36 games with the Bisons prior to his call up.

Moreno earned his first major league hit on June 11, 2022, a single, in his fourth at-bat of the day. On October 5, Moreno hit his first career home run, a three–run shot off of Baltimore Orioles reliever Mike Baumann.

=== Arizona Diamondbacks ===
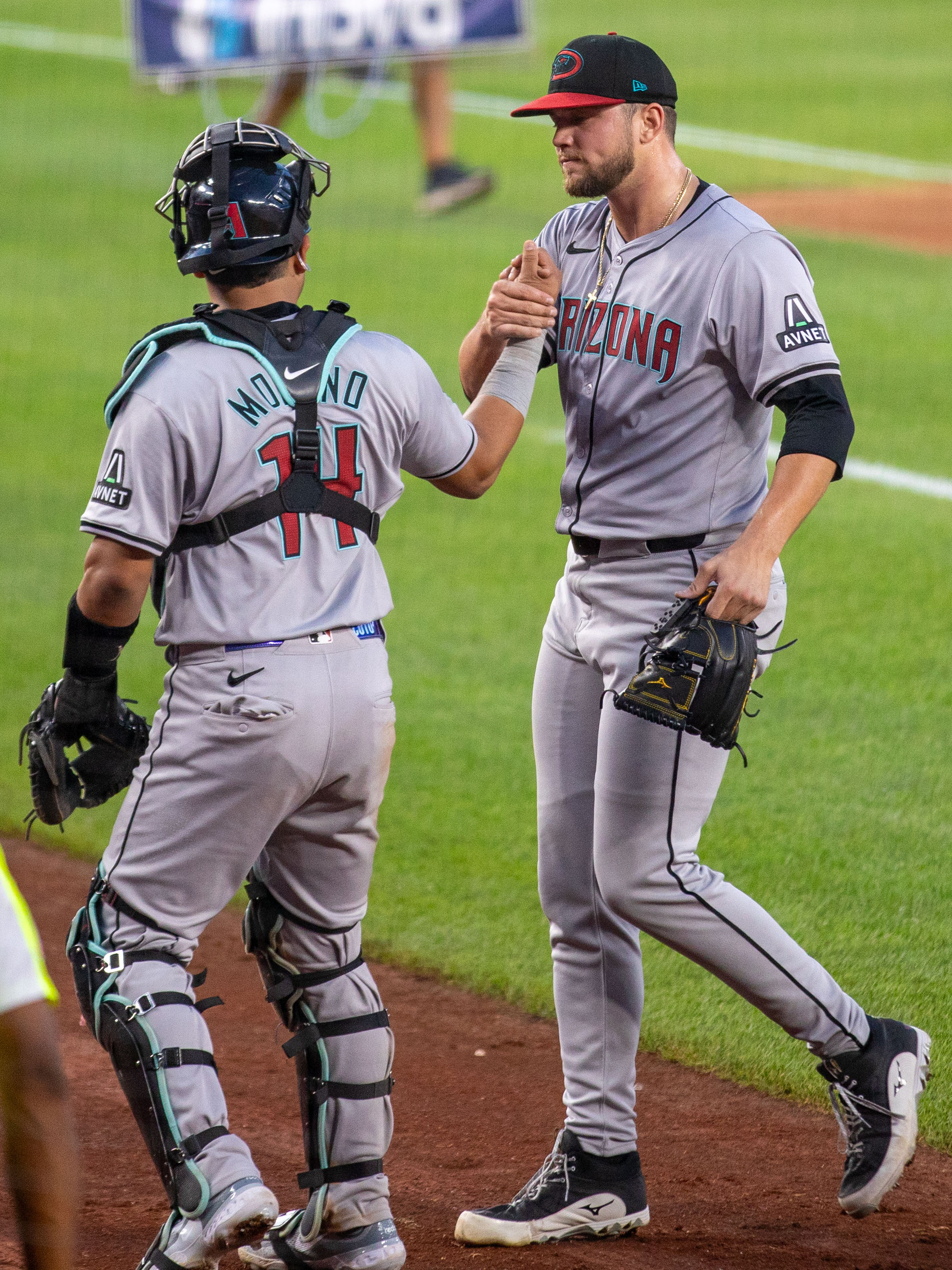
Moreno (left) with Slade Cecconi during a Diamondbacks game in 2024

On December 23, 2022, the Blue Jays traded Moreno and Lourdes Gurriel Jr. to the Arizona Diamondbacks in exchange for Daulton Varsho.

==== 2023 ====
After backing up Carson Kelly to start the 2023 season, Moreno became the Diamondbacks' primary catcher midway through the season after Kelly was designated for assignment. In his first full season in MLB, Moreno finished with a 3.1 defensive WAR, the highest in the majors. Moreno also caught 39% of potential base-stealers, which was the best in all of MLB (minimum 20 attempts), and he led all MLB catchers in defensive runs saved with 20. With his offense, he had a slash line of .284/.339/.408 with seven homers, 50 runs batted in, and six stolen bases. Moreno was awarded the Rawlings Gold Glove Award for National League catchers.

On October 7, 2023, in game 1 of the NLDS against the Los Angeles Dodgers, Moreno hit a three-run home run off Clayton Kershaw in the first inning to blow the game wide open that extended his team's lead from two to five runs before Kershaw recorded the first out, scoring Tommy Pham and Christian Walker. In game 3, Moreno was one of four Diamondbacks hitters to hit a home run in the third inning off Dodgers pitcher Lance Lynn. After his first initial home run was deemed foul, Moreno sent the next pitch he saw over the left field wall, covering 420 feet.

After the Diamondbacks went down 2–0 against the Philadelphia Phillies in the NLCS, Moreno was moved up from fifth to third in the batting lineup. With Moreno hitting third, the Diamondbacks won four of the next five games to clinch their first National League pennant and their first World Series appearance since 2001, with Moreno driving home the game-winning runs in games 4 and 7. In game 2 of the World Series against the Texas Rangers, Moreno hit a home run in the Diamondbacks 9–1 victory, their lone victory of the series.

==== 2024 ====
On August 5, 2024, Moreno suffered a left groin strain and was removed from the game. He was later placed on the 10-day injured list with a left adductor strain. Moreno made 97 total appearances for the Diamondbacks during the course of the season, slashing .266/.353/.380 with five home runs, 45 RBI, and three stolen bases.

==== 2025 ====
Moreno played in 53 contests for the Diamondbacks to begin the season, hitting .270/.324/.414 with five home runs, 20 RBI, and one stolen base. On June 20, 2025, Moreno was placed on the injured list with a hairline fracture in his right index finger; he was transferred to the 60-day injured list on July 18. Moreno was activated on August 22.

==== 2026 ====
Moreno led the National League with a .311 average, becoming the first catcher to do so since 2012. Following the 2026 MLB regular season Moreno was awarded the MLB Batting Title, Moreno became the Arizona Diamondbacks only player to win one. Shortly after Moreno became a finalist for the National League Gold Glove Award for the catcher position.

== See also ==
- Arizona Diamondbacks award winners and league leaders
- List of Major League Baseball players from Venezuela
