= Geraldo Perdomo =

Dominican baseball player (born 1999)

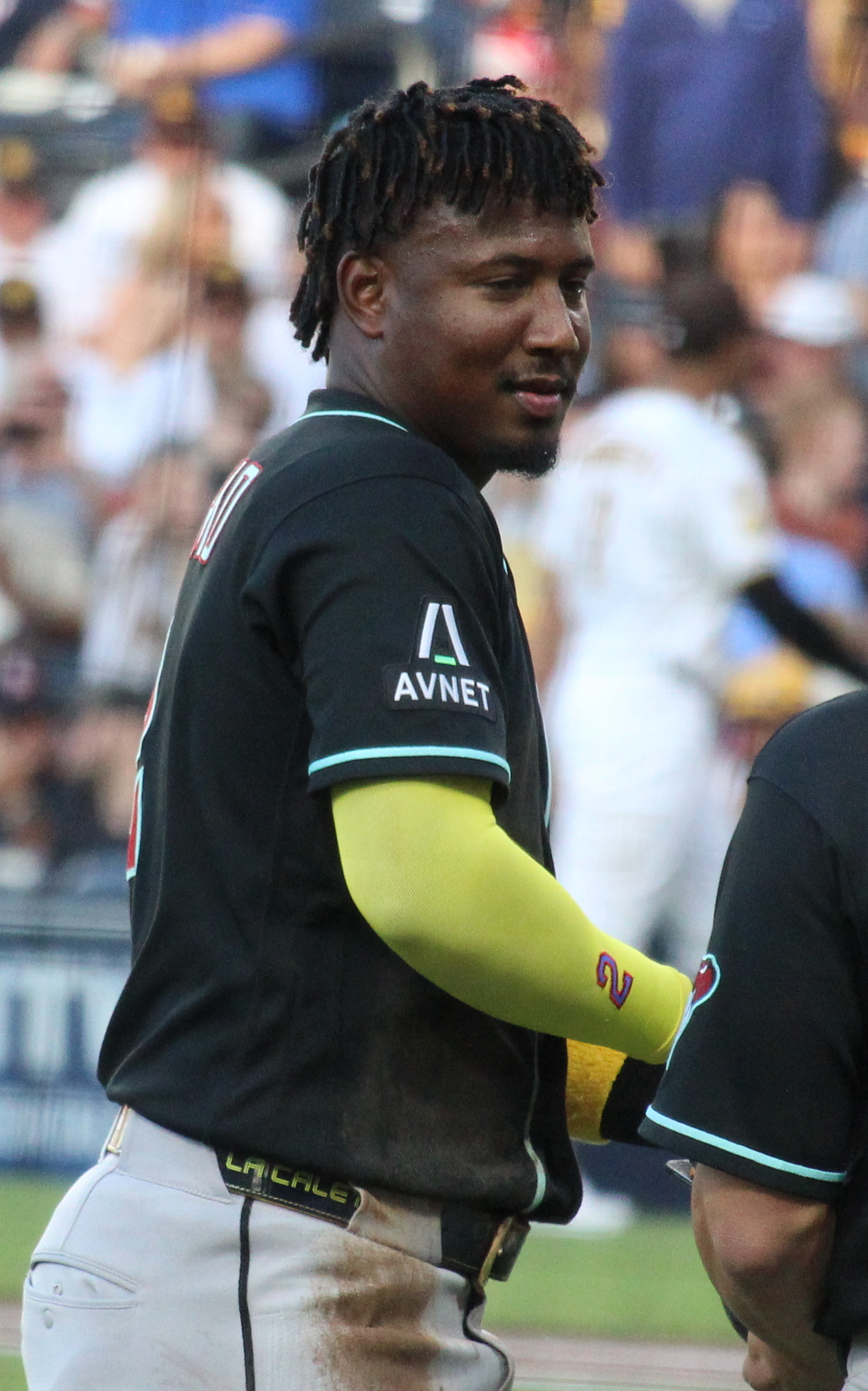
- Perdomo with the Diamondbacks in 2026

Arizona Diamondbacks – No. 2
- Shortstop
- Born: October 22, 1999 (age 27); Santo Domingo, Dominican Republic
- Bats: Switch Throws: Right

MLB debut
- April 3, 2021, for the Arizona Diamondbacks

MLB statistics (through 2026 season)
- Batting average: .255
- Home runs: 43
- Runs batted in: 284
- Stats at Baseball Reference

Teams
- Arizona Diamondbacks (2021–present)

Career highlights and awards
- All-Star (2023); Gold Glove Award (2026); Silver Slugger Award (2025)
Medals
Men's baseball
Representing Dominican Republic
World Baseball Classic
Bronze medal – third place	2026 Miami	Team

Geraldo Rafael Perdomo (born October 22, 1999) is a Dominican professional baseball shortstop for the Arizona Diamondbacks of Major League Baseball (MLB). He made his MLB debut in 2021. He was named to his first MLB All-Star Game in 2023 and helped the Diamondbacks win their first National League pennant since 2001.

== Career ==
Perdomo signed with the Arizona Diamondbacks as an international free agent on July 2, 2016. He made his professional debut in 2017 with the Dominican Summer League Giants, batting .238 with one home run and 11 RBI over 63 games. In 2018, Perdomo played for the rookie-level Arizona League Diamondbacks, rookie-level Missoula Osprey, and Low-A Hillsboro Hops, slashing a combined .322/.438/.460 with four home runs, 24 RBI, and 24 stolen bases over 57 games.

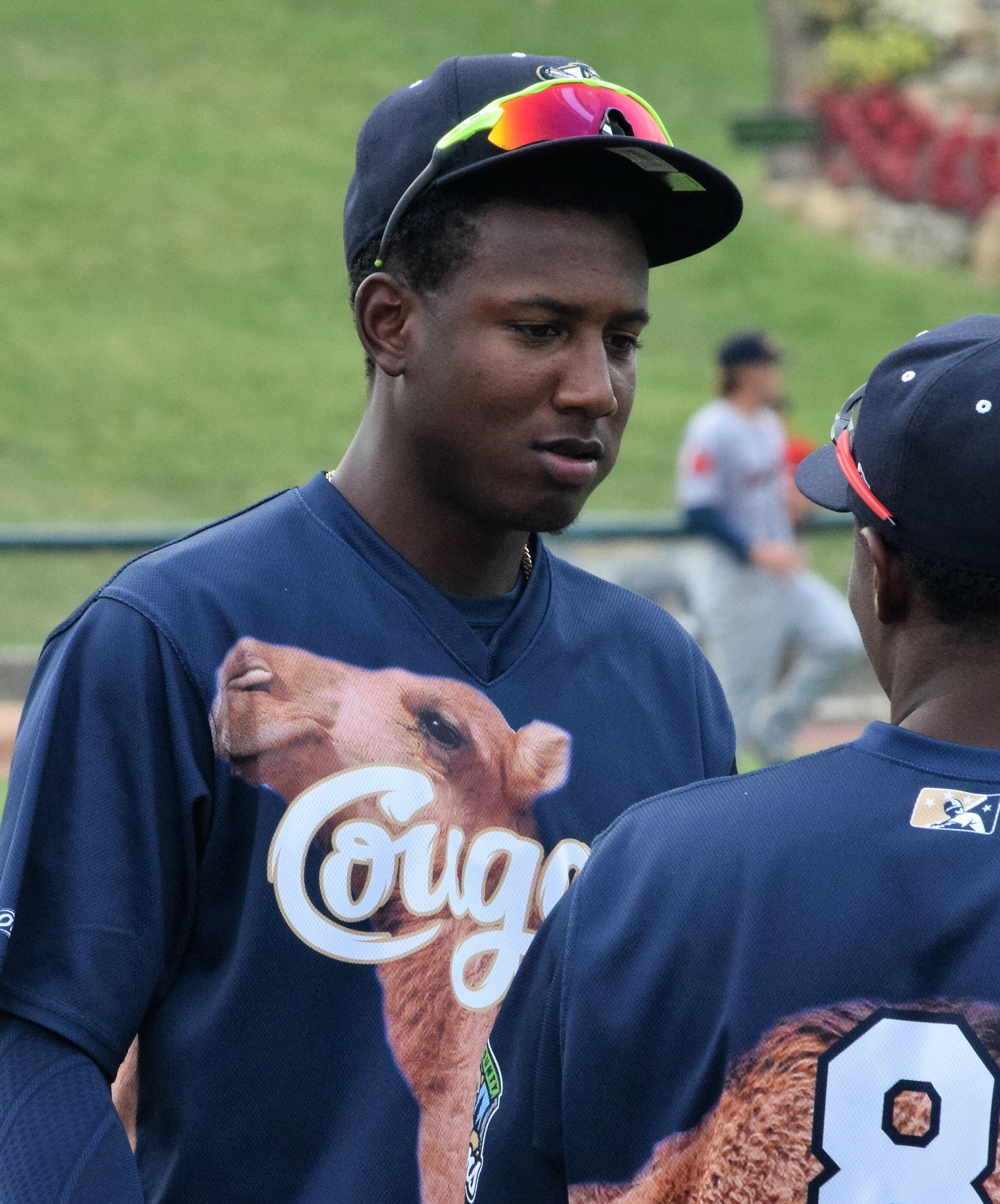
Perdomo with the Kane County Cougars in 2019

Perdomo started 2019 with the Single-A Kane County Cougars and was promoted to the High-A Visalia Rawhide during the season. Over 116 games between both clubs, Perdomo hit .275 with three home runs, 47 RBI, and 26 stolen bases. After the season, he played in the Arizona Fall League and was selected to play in the Falls Stars Game. Perdomo did not play in a game in 2020 due to the cancellation of the minor league season because of the COVID-19 pandemic.

On November 20, 2020, the Diamondbacks added Perdomo to their 40-man roster in order to protect him from the Rule 5 draft. On April 3, 2021, Perdomo was promoted to the major leagues to fill in for the injured Nick Ahmed. He made his MLB debut that night, filling in for Josh Rojas at shortstop. In 11 games for Arizona during his rookie campaign, Perdomo went 8-for-31 (.258) with one RBI.

On June 7, 2022, Perdomo hit his first career home run, a grand slam, against Jared Solomon of the Cincinnati Reds. In 2022, he tied (along with Tomás Nido) for the major league lead in sacrifice hits with 12, and batted .195/.285/.262 with five home runs, 40 RBI, and nine stolen bases in 462 at-bats. Perdomo made 144 appearances for the Diamondbacks during the 2023 campaign, slashing .246/.353/.359 with career-highs in home runs (6), RBI (47), and stolen bases (16).

On April 7, 2024, it was announced that Perdomo had suffered a torn meniscus in his knee that would require surgery to repair. He played in 98 total games for Arizona in 2024, batting .273/.344/.374 with three home runs, 37 RBI, and nine stolen bases.

On February 18, 2025, Perdomo agreed to a four-year, $45 million contract extension with the Diamondbacks.

== See also ==
- Arizona Diamondbacks award winners and league leaders
- List of Major League Baseball players from the Dominican Republic
