= Christian Walker =

American baseball player (born 1991)

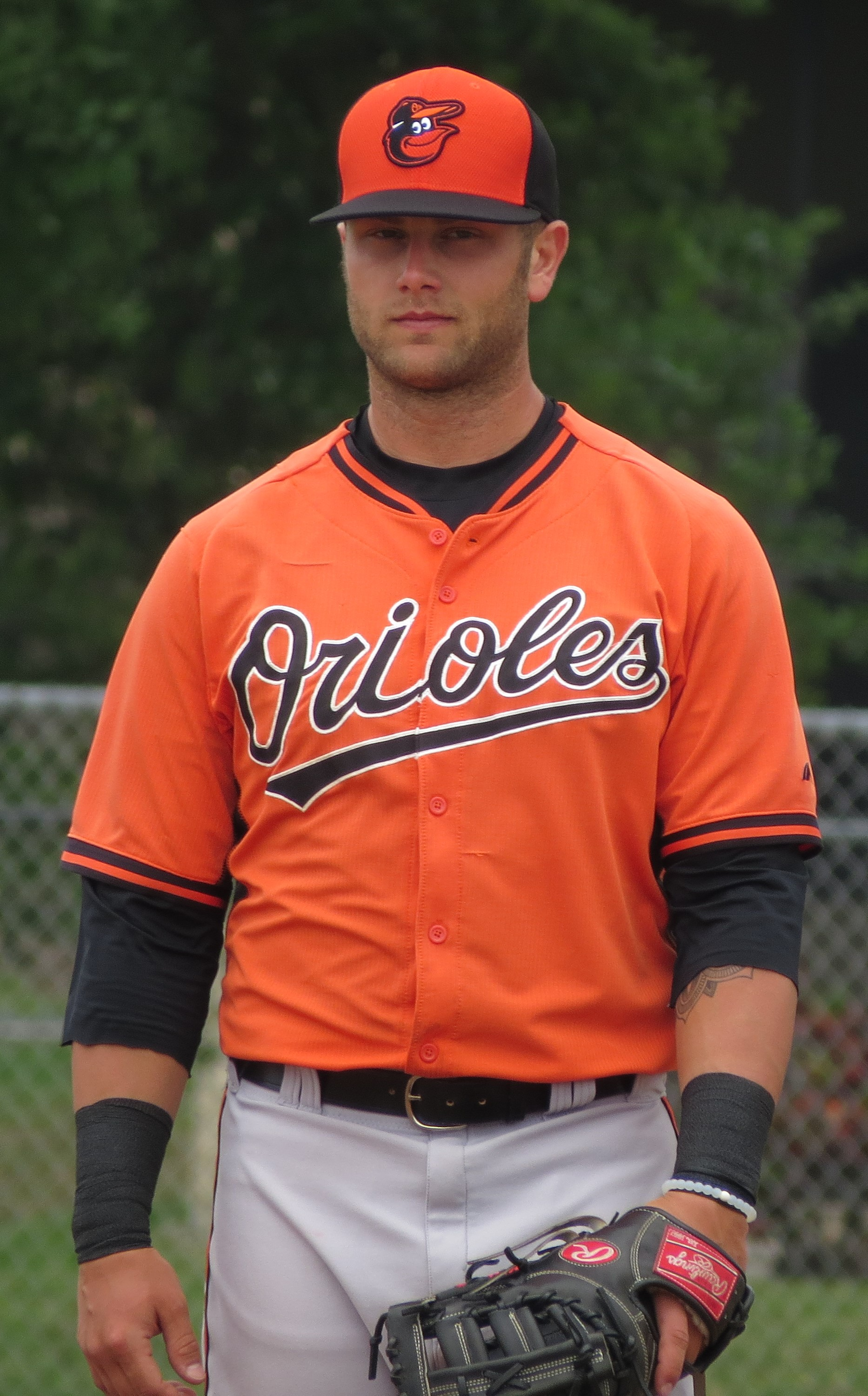
- Walker with the Baltimore Orioles in 2015

Houston Astros – No. 8
- First baseman
- Born: March 28, 1991 (age 35); Norristown, Pennsylvania, U.S.
- Bats: Right Throws: Right

MLB debut
- September 17, 2014, for the Baltimore Orioles

MLB statistics (through 2026 season)
- Batting average: .245
- Home runs: 203
- Runs batted in: 618
- Stats at Baseball Reference

Teams
- Baltimore Orioles (2014–2015); Arizona Diamondbacks (2017–2024); Houston Astros (2025–present)

Career highlights and awards
- 4× Gold Glove Award (2022–2024, 2026)

Christian Dickson Walker (born March 28, 1991) is an American professional baseball first baseman for the Houston Astros of Major League Baseball (MLB). He has previously played in MLB for the Baltimore Orioles and Arizona Diamondbacks. Considered one of the best defensive first basemen in the majors, Walker is a four-time Gold Glove Award winner.

Walker played college baseball for the South Carolina Gamecocks and won the College World Series in both 2010 and 2011, and were runners-up in 2012. Selected in the fourth round of the 2012 MLB draft by the Orioles, Walker made his MLB debut with the team in 2014. However, Walker was designated for assignment four times thereafter prior to becoming the Diamondbacks' regular first baseman in 2019. In 2023, he helped lead the Diamondbacks to win their second National League pennant. After becoming a free agent following the 2024 season, he signed a three-year deal with the Astros.

== Amateur career ==
Walker attended Kennedy-Kenrick Catholic High School in Norristown, Pennsylvania. He was drafted by the Los Angeles Dodgers in the 49th round of the 2009 Major League Baseball draft, but did not sign. Walker attended the University of South Carolina and played college baseball for the South Carolina Gamecocks from 2010 to 2012. While there, he helped the Gamecocks win the College World Series in 2010 and 2011. He also helped the team reach the 2012 College World Series, where they lost to the Arizona Wildcats. He finished tied with Dustin Ackley for most career hits in the College World Series. Overall in his career at South Carolina, he played in 206 games and hit 336/.427/.533 with 30 home runs and 137 runs batted in. In 2011, he played collegiate summer baseball with the Harwich Mariners of the Cape Cod Baseball League.

== Professional career ==
=== Baltimore Orioles ===
The Baltimore Orioles selected Walker in the fourth round, at number 132 overall, of the 2012 Major League Baseball draft. He made his professional debut for the Aberdeen IronBirds, played in 22 games and hit .284/.376/.420 with two home runs. Walker started 2013 with the Delmarva Shorebirds. In May he was promoted to the Frederick Keys. In July he played in the All-Star Futures Game. After the game he was promoted to the Double-A Bowie Baysox. He finished the year playing in 103 games and hit .300/.362/.453 with 11 home runs. Walker started 2014 back with Bowie.

On September 17, 2014, Walker was called up to the Orioles from the Triple–A Norfolk Tides. He made his major league debut later that day. Facing Toronto Blue Jays pitcher J. A. Happ, Walker hit a double for his first major league hit. On September 20, Walker produced his first multi-hit game, including his first career major league home run, off Boston Red Sox starter, Rubby De La Rosa. In 6 games during his rookie campaign, he went 3-for-18 (.167) with 1 home run and 1 RBI. Walker played in 7 games for the Orioles in 2015, going 1-for-9 (.111) with 3 walks.

Walker did not appear for the Orioles in 2016, instead spending the year with the Triple-A Norfolk. In 131 appearances for Norfolk, he slashed .264/.321/.437 with 18 home runs and 64 RBI. During Walker's tenure in the Orioles organization, Chris Davis, who had connected for 53 home runs in 2013, 47 in 2015, and 38 in 2016, occupied the top of the franchise's depth chart at first base. On February 21, 2017, Walker was designated for assignment following the acquisition of Richard Bleier from the New York Yankees.

=== Arizona Diamondbacks ===
On March 6, 2017, the Cincinnati Reds, who had Joey Votto at first base, claimed Walker off waivers. The Atlanta Braves, who had Freddie Freeman at first base, also put a waiver claim on Walker, but lost due to the order.

On March 28, 2017, Walker was waived by the Reds and claimed off waivers by the Arizona Diamondbacks, who had Paul Goldschmidt at first base. On March 30, Walker was removed from the 40-man roster and sent outright to the Triple-A Reno Aces of the Pacific Coast League (PCL). He was selected as the 2017 PCL Most Valuable Player after hitting .309/.382/.597 with 32 home runs and 114 RBI in 133 games for Reno. On September 10, the Diamondbacks selected Walker's contract, adding him to their active roster. In 11 games for the team, he went 3-for-12 (.250) with 2 home runs and 2 RBI.

Walker played in 37 games for Arizona in 2018, hitting .163/.226/.388 with three home runs, six RBI, and one stolen base. Following the 2018 season, the St. Louis Cardinals acquired Goldschmidt, clearing a path for Walker to become the Diamondbacks' regular first baseman.

In 2019, Walker played his first full major league season, played in 152 games and made 603 plate appearances, batting .259/.348/.476 with career-highs in home runs (29) and RBI (73). With 8 stolen bases, he established another career high. Walker graded with a +9 Defensive Runs Saved (DRS) rating, the best in the National League (NL) among first basemen, and led all major league first basemen with 139 assists. In the pandemic-shortened 2020 season, Walker played in 57 of 60 possible games and slashed .271/.333/.459 with seven home runs and 34 RBI.

Walker made 115 appearances for Arizona during the 2021 campaign, batting .244/.315/.382 with 10 home runs and 46 RBI. In 2022, Walker played in 160 games and hit a career-high 36 home runs with 94 RBI. Following the season, he won his first career Gold Glove Award.

On January 13, 2023, Walker agreed to a one-year, $6.5 million contract with the Diamondbacks, avoiding salary arbitration. On May 31, 2023, Walker connected for his 100th career home run, and, the following day, collected his 500th career hit. He finished the season batting .258/.333/.497 with 36 doubles, 33 home runs, and career-highs of 103 RBI and 11 stolen bases in 157 games played. Walker placed 8th in the NL in doubles, 10th in RBI, and fourth in putouts (1,075) at first base. He also helped lead the Diamondbacks to a Wild Card title, win the NL pennant and a World Series appearance, where they were defeated by the Texas Rangers in five games. In the postseason, Walker batted .217/.360/.350/.710 over 17 games, with 5 doubles, 1 home run, 7 RBI, 13 bases on balls, and 6 stolen bases without being caught stealing. Following the season, he was awarded his second consecutive Gold Glove.

Walker played in 130 games for the Diamondbacks in 2024, batting .251/.335/.468 with 26 home runs and 84 RBI. He won the Gold Glove Award for the third straight year.

=== Houston Astros ===
On December 23, 2024, Walker signed a three-year, $60 million contract with the Houston Astros. He connected for his first home run as an Astro on April 3, 2025, off Joe Ryan, leading a 5–2 win over the Minnesota Twins. On April 23, 2025, Walker hit the 150th home run of his career off Bowden Francis in a 3–1 win over the Toronto Blue Jays. Walker hit his first walk-off home run as a member of the Astros on May 25 against Casey Legumina of the Seattle Mariners to a secure a 5–3 win. It was his third career walk-off hit. Walker recorded his 500th career RBI on August 2, 2025, when he hit a two-run home run off Red Sox pitcher Walker Buehler in the first inning, but the Red Sox defeated the Astros, 7–3. Walker concluded the season hitting .238/.297/.460, 24 doubles, 27 home runs, and 88 RBI over 154 games, the fourth time in career making at least 150 appearances. On defense, Walker led American League (AL) fielders with 1,100 putouts, and, among AL first baseman, led with 152 games, ranked third in double plays (89) and errors (6), and fourth in fielding percentage (.995).

On Opening Day, 2026, Walker scored the 500th run of his career. On July 5 versus the Tampa Bay Rays, Walker hit his 20th home run, giving him five consecutive years with as many. On August 14, Walker hit his third career walk-off home run to cap a dramatic five-run comeback during the bottom of the tenth inning versus Seattle and 10–7 victory. He opened the season without committing an error through the first 121 games, until August 21, tops among all major league infielders. On September 22, Walker homered for the 200th of his career, off Logan Gilbert at T-Mobile Park. For the season, he hit .226/.299/.427/.727, 26 doubles, 29 home runs, 87 RBI, and 51 walks over 154 games. The 29 home runs ranked ninth in the AL. Walker led AL first basemen with a .997 fielding percentage, ranked second in double plays turned (109) and fourth in assists (112). During the two-game Wild Card Series, he went 0-for-6 and drew two walks. The Chicago White Sox swept the Astros to eliminate them from the playoffs. He won his fourth career Gold Glove, to become the third at his position to win in both the AL and NL, joining Matt Olson—also a winner this season as a member of the Atlanta Braves—and J. T. Snow.

== See also ==
- Arizona Diamondbacks award winners and league leaders
- List of Major League Baseball annual putouts leaders
