= 2024 Arizona Diamondbacks season =

2024 Arizona Diamondbacks
- League: National League
- Division: West
- Ballpark: Chase Field
- City: Phoenix, Arizona
- Record: 89–73 (.549)
- Divisional place: 3rd
- Owners: Ken Kendrick
- General managers: Mike Hazen
- Managers: Torey Lovullo
- Television: Games distributed to local cable providers like YurView Arizona
- Radio: KMVP-FM (98.7)
- Stats: ESPN.com; Baseball Reference

The 2024 Arizona Diamondbacks season was the franchise's 27th season in Major League Baseball and their 27th season at Chase Field in Phoenix, Arizona, as members of the National League West. They were managed by Torey Lovullo in his eighth season with the franchise. They entered the season as the defending National League champions and runner-ups of the 2023 World Series. The Diamondbacks also opened this season with their best opening game in franchise history with a 16–1 blowout win at home over the Colorado Rockies, with 14 of those runs coming in the third inning.

On August 25, the Diamondbacks had a seven game lead on a wild card spot. However, the Diamondbacks faltered down the stretch, and on September 30, the Atlanta Braves and New York Mets played a make-up doubleheader. With the Diamondbacks needing one team to sweep the two games in order to claim one of the two remaining National League playoff spots, the Diamondbacks were eliminated from postseason contention after they split their doubleheader. All three teams ended with the same 89–73 record, with the Diamondbacks losing the tie-breaking head to head season series to both the Braves and the Mets. They became the first World Series runner-ups to miss the following postseason since the Tampa Bay Rays in 2009.

For the season, the Diamondbacks changed their uniforms and logos. Teal came back permanently as a secondary for the first time since 2006, replacing the Sedona red as the secondary color.

== Offseason ==
=== Transactions ===
==== November 2023 ====
November 2	3B Evan Longoria, OFs Lourdes Gurriel Jr. and Tommy Pham elected free agency
November 5	RHP Mark Melancon elected free agency after having his mutual option declined by the Diamondbacks.
November 22	Seattle Mariners traded 3B Eugenio Suarez to Arizona Diamondbacks for RHP Carlos Vargas and C Seby Zavala.

==== December 2023 ====
December 8	Diamondbacks signed left-handed pitcher Eduardo Rodríguez to a 4 year, $80 million contract
December 22	Diamondbacks signed outfielder Lourdes Gurriel Jr. to a 3 year, $42 million contract

==== January 2024 ====
January 30	Diamondbacks signed designated hitter/outfielder Joc Pederson to a 1 year, $12.5 million contract

==== February 2024 ====
February 3	Chicago White Sox traded RHP Cristian Mena to Arizona Diamondbacks for outfielder Dominic Fletcher
February 17	Diamondbacks signed outfielder Randal Grichuk to a 1 year, $2 million contract

==== March 2024 ====
March 29	Diamondbacks signed pitcher Jordan Montgomery to a 1 year, $25 million contract, with a $20 million vesting option for 2025

==== April 2024 ====
April 19	Diamondbacks outfielder Jace Peterson was Designated for assignment.
April 23	Diamondbacks claimed left-handed pitcher Joe Jacques off waivers from the Boston Red Sox
April 23	Diamondbacks acquired shortstop Sergio Alcántara from the Pittsburgh Pirates for cash considerations.

==== May 2024 ====
May 2	Diamondbacks acquired pitcher Matt Bowman from the Minnesota Twins for cash considerations.

==== June 2024 ====
June 6	Diamondbacks claim left-handed pitcher Thyago Vieira off waivers from the Baltimore Orioles.

==== July 2024 ====
July 25	Miami Marlins traded LHP A. J. Puk to Arizona Diamondbacks for 3B Deyvison De Los Santos and SS Andrew Pintar.
July 27	Diamondbacks RHP Thyago Vieira was Designated for assignment.
July 29	Miami Marlins traded 1B Josh Bell to Arizona Diamondbacks in exchange for a player to be named later or cash considerations.
July 29	Washington Nationals traded RHP Dylan Floro to Arizona Diamondbacks for infielder Andrés Chaparro.
July 29	Diamondbacks RHP Miguel Castro was Designated for assignment.

==== August 2024 ====
August 8	Diamondbacks RHP Luis Frías was Designated for assignment.
August 20	Diamondbacks RHP Gavin Hollowell was Designated for assignment.

==== September 2024 ====
September 17	Diamondbacks released RHP Dylan Floro.
September 20	Diamondbacks INF Luis Guillorme was Designated for assignment.

== Season standings ==
=== National League West ===
NL West
Team	W	L	Pct.	GB	Home	Road
Los Angeles Dodgers	98	64	.605	—	52‍–‍29	46‍–‍35
San Diego Padres	93	69	.574	5	45‍–‍36	48‍–‍33
Arizona Diamondbacks	89	73	.549	9	44‍–‍37	45‍–‍36
San Francisco Giants	80	82	.494	18	42‍–‍39	38‍–‍43
Colorado Rockies	61	101	.377	37	37‍–‍44	24‍–‍57

=== National League Wild Card ===
Division leaders
Team	W	L	Pct.
Los Angeles Dodgers	98	64	.605
Philadelphia Phillies	95	67	.586
Milwaukee Brewers	93	69	.574

Wild Card teams (Top 3 teams qualify for postseason)
Team	W	L	Pct.	GB
San Diego Padres	93	69	.574	+4
Atlanta Braves	89	73	.549	—
New York Mets	89	73	.549	—
Arizona Diamondbacks	89	73	.549	—
St. Louis Cardinals	83	79	.512	6
Chicago Cubs	83	79	.512	6
San Francisco Giants	80	82	.494	9
Cincinnati Reds	77	85	.475	12
Pittsburgh Pirates	76	86	.469	13
Washington Nationals	71	91	.438	18
Miami Marlins	62	100	.383	27
Colorado Rockies	61	101	.377	28

=== Record vs. opponents ===
==== Record vs. National League ====
2024 National League record Source: MLB Standings Grid – 2024
Team	AZ	ATL	CHC	CIN	COL	LAD	MIA	MIL	NYM	PHI	PIT	SD	SF	STL	WSH	AL
Arizona	—	2–5	3–3	5–1	9–4	6–7	4–2	4–3	3–4	4–3	4–2	6–7	7–6	3–3	5–1	24–22
Atlanta	5–2	—	4–2	2–4	3–3	2–5	9–4	2–4	7–6	7–6	3–3	3–4	4–3	2–4	5–8	31–15
Chicago	3–3	2–4	—	5–8	4–2	4–2	4–3	5–8	3–4	2–4	7–6	2–4	3–4	6–7	6–1	27–19
Cincinnati	1–5	4–2	8–5	—	6–1	4–3	5–2	4–9	2–4	4–3	5–8	2–4	2–4	7–6	2–4	21–25
Colorado	4–9	3–3	2–4	1–6	—	3–10	2–5	4–3	2–4	2–4	2–4	8–5	3–10	3–4	2–4	20–26
Los Angeles	7–6	5–2	2–4	3–4	10–3	—	5–1	4–3	4–2	1–5	4–2	5–8	9–4	5–2	4–2	30–16
Miami	2–4	4–9	3–4	2–5	5–2	1–5	—	4–2	6–7	6–7	0–7	2–4	3–3	3–3	2–11	19–27
Milwaukee	3–4	4–2	8–5	9–4	3–4	3–4	2–4	—	5–1	2–4	7–6	2–5	4–2	8–5	2–4	31–15
New York	4–3	6–7	4–3	4–2	4–2	2–4	7–6	1–5	—	6–7	5–2	5–2	2–4	4–2	11–2	24–22
Philadelphia	3–4	6–7	4–2	3–4	4–2	5–1	7–6	4–2	7–6	—	3–4	5–1	5–2	4–2	9–4	26–20
Pittsburgh	2–4	3–3	6–7	8–5	4–2	2–4	7–0	6–7	2–5	4–3	—	0–6	2–4	5–8	4–3	20–26
San Diego	7–6	4–3	4–2	4–2	5–8	8–5	4–2	5–2	2–5	1–5	6–0	—	7–6	3–4	6–0	27–19
San Francisco	6–7	3–4	4–3	4–2	10–3	4–9	3–3	2–4	4–2	2–5	4–2	6–7	—	1–5	4–3	23–23
St. Louis	3–3	4–2	7–6	6–7	4–3	2–5	3–3	5–8	2–4	2–4	8–5	4–3	5–1	—	4–3	24–22
Washington	1–5	8–5	1–6	4–2	4–2	2–4	11–2	4–2	2–11	4–9	3–4	0–6	3–4	3–4	—	21–25

Updated with the results of all games through September 30, 2024.

==== Record vs. American League ====
2024 National League record vs. American League Source: MLB Standings
Team	BAL	BOS	CWS	CLE	DET	HOU	KC	LAA	MIN	NYY	OAK	SEA	TB	TEX	TOR
Arizona	1–2	3–0	2–1	3–0	1–2	1–2	2–1	2–1	1–2	1–2	2–1	1–2	0–3	2–2	2–1
Atlanta	1–2	3–1	1–2	2–1	3–0	3–0	2–1	2–1	3–0	2–1	2–1	1–2	2–1	2–1	2–1
Chicago	3–0	1–2	4–0	0–3	2–1	3–0	2–1	2–1	2–1	1–2	1–2	2–1	1–2	1–2	2–1
Cincinnati	0–3	1–2	3–0	1–3	0–3	3–0	0–3	3–0	2–1	3–0	1–2	0–3	1–2	1–2	2–1
Colorado	1–2	2–1	1–2	2–1	1–2	0–4	2–1	2–1	1–2	1–2	1–2	1–2	1–2	3–0	1–2
Los Angeles	2–1	3–0	3–0	2–1	1–2	1–2	2–1	2–2	2–1	2–1	2–1	3–0	2–1	1–2	2–1
Miami	2–1	0–3	2–1	1–2	2–1	0–3	1–2	0–3	2–1	1–2	1–2	2–1	1–3	1–2	3–0
Milwaukee	2–1	2–1	3–0	3–0	2–1	1–2	1–2	2–1	3–1	1–2	2–1	2–1	2–1	3–0	2–1
New York	2–1	3–0	3–0	0–3	1–2	1–2	2–1	1–2	2–1	4–0	1–2	0–3	0–3	2–1	2–1
Philadelphia	1–2	1–2	3–0	1–2	2–1	2–1	2–1	2–1	1–2	0–3	1–2	1–2	3–0	3–0	3–1
Pittsburgh	2–1	0–3	3–0	1–2	2–2	2–1	1–2	1–2	2–1	2–1	0–3	2–1	1–2	1–2	1–2
San Diego	2–1	2–1	3–0	2–1	2–1	2–1	2–1	0–3	2–1	1–2	3–0	1–3	2–1	2–1	1–2
San Francisco	2–1	1–2	2–1	1–2	2–1	2–1	3–0	1–2	2–1	0–3	2–2	1–2	1–2	2–1	1–2
St. Louis	3–0	2–1	1–2	2–1	1–2	1–2	1–3	2–1	2–1	2–1	2–1	1–2	2–1	2–1	0–3
Washington	2–2	1–2	1–2	1–2	2–1	2–1	0–3	2–1	1–2	2–1	1–2	2–1	1–2	1–2	2–1

Updated with the results of all games through September 30, 2024.

== Game log ==
=== Regular season ===
Legend
	Diamondbacks win
	Diamondbacks loss
	Postponement
	Eliminated from playoff spot
**Bold**	Diamondbacks team member

2024 Game Log: 89–73 (Home: 44–37; Away: 45–36)
March/April: 14–17 (Home: 8–7; Away: 6–10)

#	Date	Opponent	Score	Win	Loss	Save	Attendance	Record	Streak
1	March 28	Rockies	16–1	**Gallen** (1–0)	Freeland (0–1)	—	49,011	1–0	W1
2	March 29	Rockies	7–3	**Kelly** (1–0)	Quantrill (0–1)	—	29,480	2–0	W2
3	March 30	Rockies	4–9	Lambert (1–0)	**Henry** (0–1)	—	32,133	2–1	L1
4	March 31	Rockies	5–1	**Pfaadt** (1–0)	Feltner (0–1)	—	21,824	3–1	W1
5	April 1	Yankees	2–5	Weaver (2–0)	**R. Nelson** (0–1)	González (1)	38,608	3–2	L1
6	April 2	Yankees	7–0	**Gallen** (2–0)	Cortés Jr. (0–1)	—	39,863	4–2	W1
7	April 3	Yankees	5–6 (11)	Holmes (1–0)	**McGough** (0–1)	Ferguson (1)	35,038	4–3	L1
8	April 5	@ Braves	5–6 (10)	Johnson (2–0)	**McGough** (0–2)	—	41,426	4–4	L2
9	April 6	@ Braves	8–9	Minter (1–1)	**Frías** (0–1)	Iglesias (1)	41,278	4–5	L3
10	April 7	@ Braves	2–5	Sale (1–0)	**R. Nelson** (0–2)	Johnson (1)	40,693	4–6	L4
11	April 8	@ Rockies	5–7	Lambert (2–0)	**McGough** (0–3)	Bird (1)	18,870	4–7	L5
12	April 9	@ Rockies	3–2	**Kelly** (2–0)	Quantrill (0–2)	**Ginkel** (1)	19,359	5–7	W1
13	April 10	@ Rockies	5–3	**Mantiply** (1–0)	Lawrence (0–1)	**Ginkel** (2)	18,311	6–7	W2
14	April 12	Cardinals	6–9	Gallegos (2–0)	**Mantiply** (1–1)	Helsley (5)	29,247	6–8	L1
15	April 13	Cardinals	4–2	**R. Nelson** (1–2)	Gibson (1–2)	**Ginkel** (3)	33,640	7–8	W1
16	April 14	Cardinals	5–0	**Gallen** (3–0)	Mikolas (1–2)	—	26,460	8–8	W2
17	April 15	Cubs	2–3 (11)	Thompson (1–0)	**Jarvis** (0–1)	—	24,468	8–9	L1
18	April 16	Cubs	12–11 (10)	**Ginkel** (1–0)	Smyly (2–2)	—	26,426	9–9	W1
19	April 17	Cubs	3–5	Wesneski (1–0)	**Pfaadt** (1–1)	—	26,567	9–10	L1
20	April 18	@ Giants	0–5	Webb (2–1)	**Allen** (0–1)	—	26,896	9–11	L2
21	April 19	@ Giants	17–1	**Montgomery** (1–0)	Snell (0–3)	—	33,921	10–11	W1
22	April 20	@ Giants	3–7	Walker (2–2)	**Gallen** (3–1)	—	31,063	10–12	L1
23	April 21	@ Giants	5–3	**Cecconi** (1–0)	Miller (0–1)	**Ginkel** (4)	35,922	11–12	W1
24	April 22	@ Cardinals	3–5	Helsley (2–2)	**Thompson** (0–1)	—	33,036	11–13	L1
25	April 23	@ Cardinals	14–1	**Henry** (1–1)	Matz (1–2)	**Allen** (1)	32,875	12–13	W1
26	April 24	@ Cardinals	1–5	Gibson (2–2)	**Montgomery** (1–1)	—	36,390	12–14	L1
27	April 26	@ Mariners	1–6	Hancock (3–2)	**Gallen** (3–2)	—	33,997	12–15	L2
28	April 27	@ Mariners	1–3	Kirby (3–2)	**Cecconi** (1–1)	Muñoz (4)	38,956	12–16	L3
29	April 28	@ Mariners	3–2	**Mantiply** (2–1)	Thornton (0–1)	**Ginkel** (5)	33,474	13–16	W1
30	April 29	Dodgers	4–8	Paxton (3–0)	**Henry** (1–2)	—	36,985	13–17	L1
31	April 30	Dodgers	4–3 (10)	**McGough** (1–3)	Crismatt (1–1)	—	28,667	14–17	W1

May: 11–15 (Home: 5–8; Away: 6–7)

#	Date	Opponent	Score	Win	Loss	Save	Attendance	Record	Streak
32	May 1	Dodgers	0–8	Yamamoto (3–1)	**Montgomery** (1–2)	—	34,088	14–18	L1
33	May 3	Padres	1–7	Cease (4–2)	**Cecconi** (1–2)	—	31,976	14–19	L2
34	May 4	Padres	1–13	King (3–3)	**Pfaadt** (1–2)	—	39,661	14–20	L3
35	May 5	Padres	11–4	**R. Nelson** (2–2)	Waldron (1–4)	—	30,968	15–20	W1
36	May 7	@ Reds	6–2	**Gallen** (4–2)	Montas (2–3)	—	14,485	16–20	W2
37	May 8	@ Reds	4–3	**Montgomery** (2–2)	Ashcraft (3–2)	**Mantiply** (1)	15,660	17–20	W3
38	May 9	@ Reds	5–4	**Ginkel** (2–0)	Cruz (1–3)	**Sewald** (1)	18,214	18–20	W4
39	May 10	@ Orioles	2–4	Irvin (4–1)	**Pfaadt** (1–3)	Canó (2)	27,703	18–21	L1
40	May 11	@ Orioles	4–5 (11)	Kimbrel (4–1)	**Jarvis** (0–2)	—	27,882	18–22	L2
41	May 12	@ Orioles	9–2	**Gallen** (5–2)	Kremer (3–3)	—	31,448	19–22	W1
42	May 13	Reds	6–5 (10)	**Martínez** (1–0)	Díaz (1–2)	—	18,017	20–22	W2
43	May 14	Reds	2–6	Greene (2–2)	**Cecconi** (1–3)	—	20,068	20–23	L1
44	May 15	Reds	2–1	**Thompson** (1–1)	Cruz (1–4)	**Sewald** (2)	16,826	21–23	W1
45	May 17	Tigers	0–13	Skubal (6–0)	**R. Nelson** (2–3)	—	25,122	21–24	L1
46	May 18	Tigers	3–8	Flaherty (1–3)	**Gallen** (5–3)	—	35,826	21–25	L2
47	May 19	Tigers	6–4	**Thompson** (2–1)	Holton (3–1)	**Sewald** (3)	26,911	22–25	W1
48	May 20	@ Dodgers	4–6	Yamamoto (5–1)	**Cecconi** (1–4)	Hudson (3)	37,634	22–26	L1
49	May 21	@ Dodgers	7–3	**Pfaadt** (2–3)	Stone (4–2)	—	46,180	23–26	W1
50	May 22	@ Dodgers	6–0	**R. Nelson** (3–3)	Glasnow (6–3)	—	46,593	24–26	W2
51	May 24	Marlins	0–3	Garrett (1–0)	**Gallen** (5–4)	—	22,642	24–27	L1
52	May 25	Marlins	3–2	**Montgomery** (3–2)	Sánchez (0–3)	**Sewald** (4)	31,966	25–27	W1
53	May 26	Marlins	1–3	Weathers (3–4)	**Ginkel** (2–1)	Scott (7)	25,723	25–28	L1
54	May 28	@ Rangers	2–4	Heaney (1–6)	**Pfaadt** (2–4)	Yates (8)	37,977	25–29	L2
55	May 29	@ Rangers	1–6	Dunning (4–3)	**R. Nelson** (3–4)	—	34,023	25–30	L3
56	May 30	@ Mets	2–3	Young (2–0)	**Thompson** (2–2)	Garrett (3)	20,926	25–31	L4
57	May 31	@ Mets	9–10	Severino (3–2)	**Montgomery** (3–3)	—	33,884	25–32	L5

June: 16–11 (Home: 9–6; Away: 7–5)

#	Date	Opponent	Score	Win	Loss	Save	Attendance	Record	Streak
58	June 1	@ Mets	10–5	**Ginkel** (3–1)	Manaea (3–2)	—	30,600	26–32	W1
59	June 2	@ Mets	5–4	**Martínez** (2–0)	Diekman (1–2)	**Sewald** (5)	31,059	27–32	W2
60	June 3	Giants	4–2	**Thompson** (3–2)	Rodríguez (1–1)	—	22,551	28–32	W3
61	June 4	Giants	8–5	**Ginkel** (4–1)	Harrison (4–3)	**Sewald** (6)	23,548	29–32	W4
62	June 5	Giants	3–9	Hjelle (3–1)	**Montgomery** (3–4)	—	24,178	29–33	L1
63	June 6	@ Padres	4–3	**Ginkel** (5–1)	Estrada (2–1)	**Sewald** (7)	39,963	30–33	W1
64	June 7	@ Padres	3–10	King (5–4)	**Pfaadt** (2–5)	—	40,341	30–34	L1
65	June 8	@ Padres	1–13	Waldron (4–5)	**R. Nelson** (3–5)	—	42,636	30–35	L2
66	June 9	@ Padres	9–3	**Henry** (2–2)	Mazur (0–1)	—	41,979	31–35	W1
67	June 11	Angels	9–4	**Montgomery** (4–4)	Suárez (1–1)	—	20,972	32–35	W2
68	June 12	Angels	3–8	Soriano (4–5)	**Cecconi** (1–5)	—	19,691	32–36	L1
69	June 13	Angels	11–1	**Pfaadt** (3–5)	Canning (2–7)	—	18,185	33–36	W1
70	June 14	White Sox	7–1	**R. Nelson** (4–5)	Flexen (2–6)	—	23,700	34–36	W2
71	June 15	White Sox	2–9	Fedde (5–1)	**Vieira** (0–1)	—	38,494	34–37	L1
72	June 16	White Sox	12–5	**Montgomery** (5–4)	Thorpe (0–1)	—	37,694	35–37	W1
73	June 18	@ Nationals	5–0	**Cecconi** (2–5)	Irvin (5–6)	—	28,230	36–37	W2
74	June 19	@ Nationals	1–3	Law (4–2)	**Pfaadt** (3–6)	Finnegan (21)	20,853	36–38	L1
75	June 20	@ Nationals	5–2	**R. Nelson** (5–5)	Gore (6–6)	**Sewald** (8)	21,158	37–38	W1
76	June 21	@ Phillies	5–4	**Montgomery** (6–4)	Walker (3–3)	**Sewald** (9)	44,436	38–38	W2
77	June 22	@ Phillies	1–12	Wheeler (9–4)	**Henry** (2–3)	—	44,288	38–39	L1
78	June 23	@ Phillies	1–4	Sánchez (5–3)	**Cecconi** (2–6)	—	44,079	38–40	L2
79	June 25	Twins	5–4	**Ginkel** (6–1)	Alcalá (1–3)	**Sewald** (10)	21,485	39–40	W1
80	June 26	Twins	3–8	Woods Richardson (3–1)	**R. Nelson** (5–6)	—	16,396	39–41	L1
81	June 27	Twins	6–13	Festa (1–0)	**Montgomery** (6–5)	—	22,671	39–42	L2
82	June 28	Athletics	4–9	Alexander (1–2)	**Thompson** (3–3)	—	25,846	39–43	L3
83	June 29	Athletics	3–0	**Gallen** (6–4)	Harris (1–2)	**Sewald** (11)	39,843	40–43	W1
84	June 30	Athletics	5–1	**Mantiply** (3–1)	McFarland (1–1)	—	26,413	41–43	W2

July: 17–8 (Home: 9–4; Away: 8–4)

#	Date	Opponent	Score	Win	Loss	Save	Attendance	Record	Streak
85	July 2	@ Dodgers	5–6	Phillips (1–0)	**Sewald** (0–1)	—	52,931	41–44	L1
86	July 3	@ Dodgers	12–4	**Jarvis** (1–2)	Yarbrough (3–2)	—	47,965	42–44	W1
87	July 4	@ Dodgers	9–3	**Martínez** (3–0)	Knack (1–2)	—	52,320	43–44	W2
88	July 5	@ Padres	8–10	Kolek (3–0)	**Sewald** (0–2)	—	47,171	43–45	L1
89	July 6	@ Padres	7–5 (10)	**Thompson** (4–3)	Peralta (2–2)	**Castellanos** (1)	44,761	44–45	W1
90	July 7	@ Padres	9–1	**R. Nelson** (6–6)	Cease (7–8)	—	41,112	45–45	W2
91	July 8	Braves	4–5 (11)	Iglesias (1–1)	**Martínez** (3–1)	Jiménez (2)	20,594	45–46	L1
92	July 9	Braves	2–6	Sale (12–3)	**Gallen** (6–5)	—	21,652	45–47	L2
93	July 10	Braves	7–5	**Thompson** (5–3)	Jiménez (1–3)	**Sewald** (12)	18,020	46–47	W1
94	July 11	Braves	1–0	**Pfaadt** (4–6)	Fried (7–5)	**Sewald** (13)	27,101	47–47	W2
95	July 12	Blue Jays	5–4	**Martínez** (4–1)	Green (2–2)	—	24,441	48–47	W3
96	July 13	Blue Jays	12–1	**Díaz** (1–0)	Berríos (8–7)	—	30,121	49–47	W4
97	July 14	Blue Jays	7–8	Richards (2–1)	**Ginkel** (6–2)	Green (6)	24,732	49–48	L1
–	July 16	**94th All-Star Game in Arlington, TX**							
98	July 19	@ Cubs	5–2	**R. Nelson** (7–6)	Steele (2–4)	**Sewald** (14)	40,691	50–48	W1
99	July 20	@ Cubs	3–0	**Gallen** (7–5)	Hendricks (2–8)	**Sewald** (15)	39,595	51–48	W2
100	July 21	@ Cubs	1–2 (10)	Neris (8–2)	**Mantiply** (3–2)	—	39,162	51–49	L1
101	July 22	@ Royals	4–10	Ragans (7–6)	**Díaz** (1–1)	—	16,275	51–50	L2
102	July 23	@ Royals	6–2	**Montgomery** (7–5)	Marsh (7–7)	—	21,993	52–50	W1
103	July 24	@ Royals	8–6	**Mantiply** (4–2)	McArthur (4–4)	—	15,931	53–50	W2
104	July 26	Pirates	4–3	**Gallen** (8–5)	Mlodzinski (2–4)	**Sewald** (16)	31,255	54–50	W3
105	July 27	Pirates	9–5	**Pfaadt** (5–6)	Priester (2–6)	—	35,905	55–50	W4
106	July 28	Pirates	5–6 (10)	Chapman (3–4)	**Martínez** (4–2)	—	27,162	55–51	L1
107	July 29	Nationals	9–8	**Mantiply** (5–2)	Finnegan (2–5)	—	18,790	56–51	W1
108	July 30	Nationals	17–0	**R. Nelson** (8–6)	Corbin (2–11)	—	19,758	57–51	W2
109	July 31	Nationals	5–4	**Gallen** (9–5)	Gore (6–9)	**Thompson** (1)	18,294	58–51	W3

August: 18–9 (Home: 7–5; Away: 11–4)

#	Date	Opponent	Score	Win	Loss	Save	Attendance	Record	Streak
110	August 2	@ Pirates	9–8	**Floro** (4–3)	Holderman (3–3)	**Thompson** (2)	22,834	59–51	W4
111	August 3	@ Pirates	2–4	Nicolas (2–2)	**Cecconi** (2–7)	Bednar (20)	35,515	59–52	L1
112	August 4	@ Pirates	6–5	**Sewald** (1–2)	Holderman (3–4)	**Puk** (2)	32,624	60–52	W1
113	August 5	@ Guardians	7–6 (10)	**Thompson** (6–3)	Clase (4–2)	**Martínez** (1)	19,570	61–52	W2
—	August 6	@ Guardians	Postponed (rain); Makeup: August 7						
114	August 7 (1)	@ Guardians	7–3	**Pfaadt** (5–6)	Lively (10–7)	—	see 2nd game	62–52	W3
115	August 7 (2)	@ Guardians	5–3	**Rodríguez** (1–0)	Carrasco (3–10)	**Martínez** (2)	26,739	63–52	W4
116	August 8	Phillies	4–6	Allard (1–0)	**Montgomery** (7–6)	Estévez (21)	25,239	63–53	L1
117	August 9	Phillies	3–2	**Martínez** (5–2)	Hoffman (3–2)	—	37,952	64–53	W1
118	August 10	Phillies	11–1	**Ginkel** (7–2)	Nola (11–6)	—	46,183	65–53	W2
119	August 11	Phillies	12–5	**Kelly** (3–0)	Sánchez (8–8)	—	29,071	66–53	W3
120	August 12	Rockies	5–4	**Pfaadt** (6–6)	Molina (1–1)	**Martínez** (3)	15,525	67–53	W4
121	August 13	Rockies	4–3	**Mantiply** (6–2)	Vodnik (3–3)	—	19,731	68–53	W5
122	August 14	Rockies	11–4	**Montgomery** (8–6)	Gordon (0–4)	—	16,464	69–53	W6
123	August 16	@ Rays	4–5	Fairbanks (3–3)	**Martínez** (5–3)	—	21,613	69–54	L1
124	August 17	@ Rays	1–6	Springs (1–1)	**Gallen** (9–6)	Lovelady (1)	17,708	69–55	L2
125	August 18	@ Rays	7–8 (12)	Uceta (1–0)	**Martínez** (5–4)	—	18,636	69–56	L3
126	August 19	@ Marlins	9–6	**Pfaadt** (8–6)	Oller (0–1)	—	7,318	70–56	W1
127	August 20	@ Marlins	3–1	**Rodríguez** (2–0)	Cabrera (2–5)	**Martínez** (4)	6,794	71–56	W2
128	August 21	@ Marlins	10–8	**Floro** (5–3)	Nardi (3–2)	**Martínez** (5)	8,248	72–56	W3
129	August 23	@ Red Sox	12–2	**R. Nelson** (9–6)	Bello (11–6)	—	32,016	73–56	W4
130	August 24	@ Red Sox	4–1	**Gallen** (10–6)	Crawford (8–11)	—	35,528	74–56	W5
131	August 25	@ Red Sox	7–5	**Kelly** (4–0)	Houck (8–9)	**Martínez** (6)	31,453	75–56	W6
132	August 27	Mets	3–8	Manaea (10–5)	**Pfaadt** (8–7)	—	22,575	75–57	L1
133	August 28	Mets	8–5	**Thompson** (7–3)	Díaz (5–3)	**Martínez** (7)	27,059	76–57	W1
134	August 29	Mets	2–3	Buttó (6–3)	**Martínez** (5–5)	Díaz (15)	18,425	76–58	L1
135	August 30	Dodgers	9–10	Brasier (1–0)	**Floro** (5–4)	—	46,606	76–59	L2
136	August 31	Dodgers	6–8	Casparius (1–0)	**Thompson** (7–4)	Phillips (18)	50,041	76–60	L3

September: 13–13 (Home: 6–7; Away: 7–6)

#	Date	Opponent	Score	Win	Loss	Save	Attendance	Record	Streak
137	September 1	Dodgers	14–3	**Pfaadt** (9–7)	Wrobleski (1–2)	—	46,278	77–60	W1
138	September 2	Dodgers	6–11	Flaherty (11–6)	**Rodríguez** (2–1)	—	43,747	77–61	L1
139	September 3	@ Giants	8–7	**R. Nelson** (10–6)	Harrison (7–7)	**Martínez** (8)	23,545	78–61	W1
140	September 4	@ Giants	6–4	**Gallen** (11–6)	Birdsong (3–5)	—	22,855	79–61	W2
141	September 5	@ Giants	2–3	Walker (9–3)	**Ginkel** (7–3)	—	27,871	79–62	L1
142	September 6	@ Astros	0–8	Valdez (14–6)	**Pfaadt** (9–8)	—	34,218	79–63	L2
143	September 7	@ Astros	5–11	Kikuchi (8–9)	**Rodríguez** (2–2)	—	35,739	79–64	L3
144	September 8	@ Astros	12–6	**Ginkel** (8–3)	Verlander (3–6)	—	34,154	80–64	W1
145	September 10	Rangers	6–0	**Gallen** (12–6)	Eovaldi (11–8)	—	25,499	81–64	W2
146	September 11	Rangers	14–4	**Floro** (6–4)	Bradford (5–3)	**Montgomery** (1)	20,473	82–64	W3
147	September 13	Brewers	1–2	Peralta (11–8)	**Rodríguez** (2–3)	Williams (12)	31,033	82–65	L1
148	September 14	Brewers	8–15	Myers (8–5)	**Pfaadt** (9–9)	—	44,886	82–66	L2
149	September 15	Brewers	11–10 (10)	**Walston** (1–0)	Koenig (8–4)	—	33,708	83–66	W1
150	September 16	@ Rockies	2–3	Halvorsen (2–0)	**Thompson** (7–5)	—	18,454	83–67	L1
151	September 17	@ Rockies	2–8	Feltner (3–10)	**Montgomery** (8–7)	—	20,421	83–68	L2
152	September 18	@ Rockies	9–4	**Rodríguez** (3–3)	Gomber (5–11)	—	20,805	84–68	W1
153	September 19	@ Brewers	5–1	**Pfaadt** (10–9)	Myers (8–6)	—	25,093	85–68	W2
154	September 20	@ Brewers	7–4	**Gallen** (13–6)	Hall (1–2)	**Puk** (3)	32,123	86–68	W3
155	September 21	@ Brewers	5–0	**Kelly** (5–0)	Civale (7–9)	—	35,068	87–68	W4
156	September 22	@ Brewers	9–10	Koenig (9–4)	**Martínez** (5–6)	Williams (13)	37,612	87–69	L1
157	September 23	Giants	3–6	Birdsong (5–5)	**Rodríguez** (3–4)	Walker (10)	23,359	87–70	L2
158	September 24	Giants	0–11	Webb (13–10)	**Pfaadt** (10–10)	—	22,355	87–71	L3
159	September 25	Giants	8–2	**Gallen** (14–6)	Black (1–5)	—	23,767	88–71	W1
160	September 27	Padres	3–5	Darvish (7–3)	**Kelly** (5–1)	Suárez (36)	43,310	88–72	L1
161	September 28	Padres	0–5	Peralta (3–2)	**Puk** (4–9)	—	42,915	88–73	L2
162	September 29	Padres	11–2	**Pfaadt** (11–10)	Pérez (5–6)	**R. Nelson** (1)	38,892	89–73	W1

== Roster ==
2024 Arizona Diamondbacks
Roster
Pitchers: 22 Logan Allen; 55 Matt Bowman; 54 Humberto Castellanos; 50 Miguel Castro; 43 Slade Cecconi; 45 Yilber Díaz; 55,58 Dylan Floro; 65 Luis Frías; 23 Zac Gallen; 37 Kevin Ginkel; 47 Tommy Henry; 56 Brandon Hughes; 55 Joe Jacques; 40 Bryce Jarvis; 29 Merrill Kelly; 35 Joe Mantiply; 63 Justin Martínez; 30 Scott McGough; 64 Cristian Mena; 52 Jordan Montgomery; 24 Kyle Nelson; 19 Ryne Nelson; 32 Brandon Pfaadt; 33 A. J. Puk; 57 Eduardo Rodriguez; 27 Andrew Saalfrank; 21,38 Paul Sewald; 81 Ryan Thompson; 49 Thyago Vieira; 48 Blake Walston	Catchers: 16 Tucker Barnhart; 25 Adrian Del Castillo; 11 José Herrera; 14 Gabriel Moreno; Infielders: 9 Blaze Alexander; 36 Josh Bell; 13 Luis Guillorme; 4 Ketel Marte; 18 Kevin Newman; 2 Geraldo Perdomo; 6 Jace Peterson; 28 Eugenio Suárez; 53 Christian Walker	Outfielders: 1 Jorge Barrosa; 7 Corbin Carroll; 15 Randal Grichuk; 12 Lourdes Gurriel Jr.; 31 Jake McCarthy; 26 Pavin Smith; 5 Alek Thomas; Other batters: 3 Joc Pederson	Manager: 17 Torey Lovullo; Coaches: 82 Jeff Banister (bench); 76 Dan Carlson (assistant pitching); 75 Damion Easley (assistant hitting); 71 Mike Fetters (bullpen); 78 Drew Hedman (assistant hitting); 74 Joe Mather (hitting); 39 Dave McKay (first base); 69 Sharif Othman (bullpen catcher); 21 Tony Perezchica (third base); 83 Jose Queliz (bullpen catcher); 73 Rick Short (assistant hitting); 72 Brent Strom (pitching)

=== MLB debuts ===
Diamondbacks had five players make their MLB debuts during the 2024 regular season:

- March 28: Blaze Alexander
- April 1: Jorge Barrosa
- May 1: Blake Walston
- July 3: Cristian Mena
- July 8: Yilber Díaz

== Player stats ==
= Indicates team leader

= Indicates league leader

=== Batting ===
Note: G = Games played; AB = At bats; R = Runs scored; H = Hits; 2B = Doubles; 3B = Triples; HR = Home runs; RBI = Runs batted in; SB = Stolen bases; BB = Walks; AVG = Batting average; SLG = Slugging average

Player	G	AB	R	H	2B	3B	HR	RBI	SB	BB	AVG	SLG
Corbin Carroll	158	589	121	136	22	14	22	74	35	73	.231	.428
Eugenio Suárez	158	571	90	146	28	2	30	101	2	49	.256	.469
Lourdes Gurriel Jr.	133	513	72	143	22	2	18	75	7	29	.279	.435
Ketel Marte	136	504	93	147	23	2	36	95	7	65	.292	.560
Christian Walker	130	479	72	120	26	0	26	84	2	55	.251	.468
Jake McCarthy	142	442	66	126	13	7	8	56	25	31	.285	.400
Joc Pederson	132	367	62	101	17	1	23	64	7	55	.275	.515
Geraldo Perdomo	98	337	61	92	21	2	3	37	9	36	.273	.374
Gabriel Moreno	97	305	39	81	18	1	5	45	3	41	.266	.380
Kevin Newman	111	288	41	80	17	1	3	28	8	15	.278	.375
Randal Grichuk	106	254	40	74	20	2	12	46	0	20	.291	.528
Blaze Alexander	61	166	19	41	7	0	3	21	3	15	.247	.343
Josh Bell	41	140	24	39	5	1	5	22	0	17	.279	.436
Pavin Smith	60	137	26	37	11	0	9	36	1	18	.270	.547
José Herrera	42	97	11	22	4	1	1	13	0	9	.227	.320
Alek Thomas	39	95	13	18	5	1	3	17	4	7	.189	.358
Tucker Barnhart	31	81	13	14	3	0	0	6	1	13	.173	.210
Adrian Del Castillo	25	80	12	25	5	0	4	19	1	7	.313	.525
Luis Guillorme	18	37	6	6	2	0	0	4	3	11	.162	.216
Jace Peterson	14	22	2	1	0	0	0	1	0	3	.045	.045
Jorge Barrosa	8	17	3	3	2	0	0	1	1	0	.176	.294
Scott McGough	2	1	0	0	0	0	0	0	0	0	.000	.000
Team totals	162	5522	886	1452	271	37	211	845	119	569	.263	.440

Source:Baseball Reference

=== Pitching ===
Note: W = Wins; L = Losses; ERA = Earned run average; G = Games pitched; GS = Games started; SV = Saves; IP = Innings pitched; H = Hits allowed; R = Runs allowed; ER = Earned runs allowed; BB = Walks allowed; SO = Strikeouts

Player	W	L	ERA	G	GS	SV	IP	H	R	ER	BB	SO
Brandon Pfaadt	11	10	4.71	32	32	0	181.2	183	103	95	42	185
Ryne Nelson	10	6	4.24	28	25	1	150.2	155	73	71	34	126
Zac Gallen	14	6	3.65	28	28	0	148.0	133	62	60	54	156
Jordan Montgomery	8	7	6.23	25	21	1	117.0	149	83	81	44	83
Slade Cecconi	2	7	6.66	20	13	0	77.0	92	57	57	17	64
Merrill Kelly	5	1	4.03	13	13	0	73.2	67	35	33	19	63
Justin Martínez	5	6	2.48	64	0	8	72.2	59	26	20	36	91
Kevin Ginkel	8	3	3.21	72	0	5	70.0	69	31	25	15	77
Ryan Thompson	7	5	3.26	67	0	2	66.1	64	26	24	15	52
Joe Mantiply	6	2	3.92	75	2	1	59.2	52	27	26	18	53
Bryce Jarvis	1	2	3.19	44	0	0	59.1	52	25	21	33	38
Eduardo Rodríguez	3	4	5.04	10	10	0	50.0	56	29	28	19	47
Paul Sewald	1	2	4.31	42	0	16	39.2	35	19	19	10	43
Tommy Henry	2	3	7.04	9	7	0	38.1	49	31	30	18	30
Scott McGough	1	3	7.44	26	2	0	32.2	34	30	27	21	25
Yilber Díaz	1	1	3.81	7	4	0	28.1	27	13	12	12	19
Logan Allen	0	1	5.46	12	0	1	28.0	32	17	17	10	21
A.J. Puk	0	1	1.32	30	0	2	27.1	15	4	4	5	43
Blake Walston	1	0	4.42	7	2	0	18.1	16	12	9	10	18
Brandon Hughes	0	0	8.15	15	2	0	17.2	24	16	16	10	21
Dylan Floro	3	1	9.37	15	0	0	16.1	23	17	17	4	8
Thyago Vieira	0	1	2.87	11	0	0	15.2	11	6	5	9	14
Miguel Castro	0	0	5.93	11	0	0	13.2	20	9	9	3	8
Kyle Nelson	0	0	4.22	11	0	0	10.2	8	5	5	4	8
Humberto Castellanos	0	0	5.23	7	0	1	10.1	11	6	6	4	7
Matt Bowman	0	0	8.10	4	0	0	6.2	8	6	6	2	4
Luis Frías	0	1	9.95	7	0	0	6.1	11	8	7	4	7
Cristian Mena	0	0	12.00	1	1	0	3.0	4	4	4	3	2
Joe Jacques	0	0	13.50	1	0	0	1.1	3	2	2	1	0
Tucker Barnhart	0	0	18.00	1	0	0	1.0	4	2	2	0	0
Andrew Saalfrank	0	0	36.00	2	0	0	1.0	2	4	4	4	0
Pavin Smith	0	0	0.00	1	0	0	1.0	0	0	0	1	0
Team totals	89	73	4.62	162	162	38	1443.1	1468	788	741	481	1313

Source:Baseball Reference

== Team Awards ==
Player	League	Team	Award
Ketel Marte	National League	Arizona Diamondbacks	Silver Slugger – Second Base
Christian Walker	National League	Arizona Diamondbacks	Gold Glove – First Base
Adrian Del Castillo	Pacific Coast League	Reno Aces	MVP
Deyvison De Los Santos	Pacific Coast League	Reno Aces	Top MLB Prospect
Deyvison De Los Santos	Pacific Coast League	Reno Aces	All-Star Team
Andrés Chaparro	Pacific Coast League	Reno Aces	All-Star Team
Tim Tawa	Texas League	Amarillo Sod Poodles	All-Star Team

== Minor league affiliations ==
Level	Team	League	Location	Manager
Triple-A	Reno Aces	Pacific Coast League	Reno, Nevada	Blake Lalli
Double-A	Amarillo Sod Poodles	Texas League	Amarillo, Texas	Shawn Roof
High-A	Hillsboro Hops	Northwest League	Hillsboro, Oregon	Javier Colina
Low-A	Visalia Rawhide	California League	Visalia, California	Dee Garner
Rookie	ACL D-backs	Arizona Complex League	Scottsdale, Arizona	Gift Ngoepe
Rookie	DSL D-backs 1	Dominican Summer League	Boca Chica, Santo Domingo	Jaime Del Valle Ronald Ramirez
Rookie	DSL D-backs 2	Dominican Summer League	Boca Chica, Santo Domingo	Jaime Del Valle Ronald Ramirez
