= Dominic Fletcher =

American baseball player (born 1997)

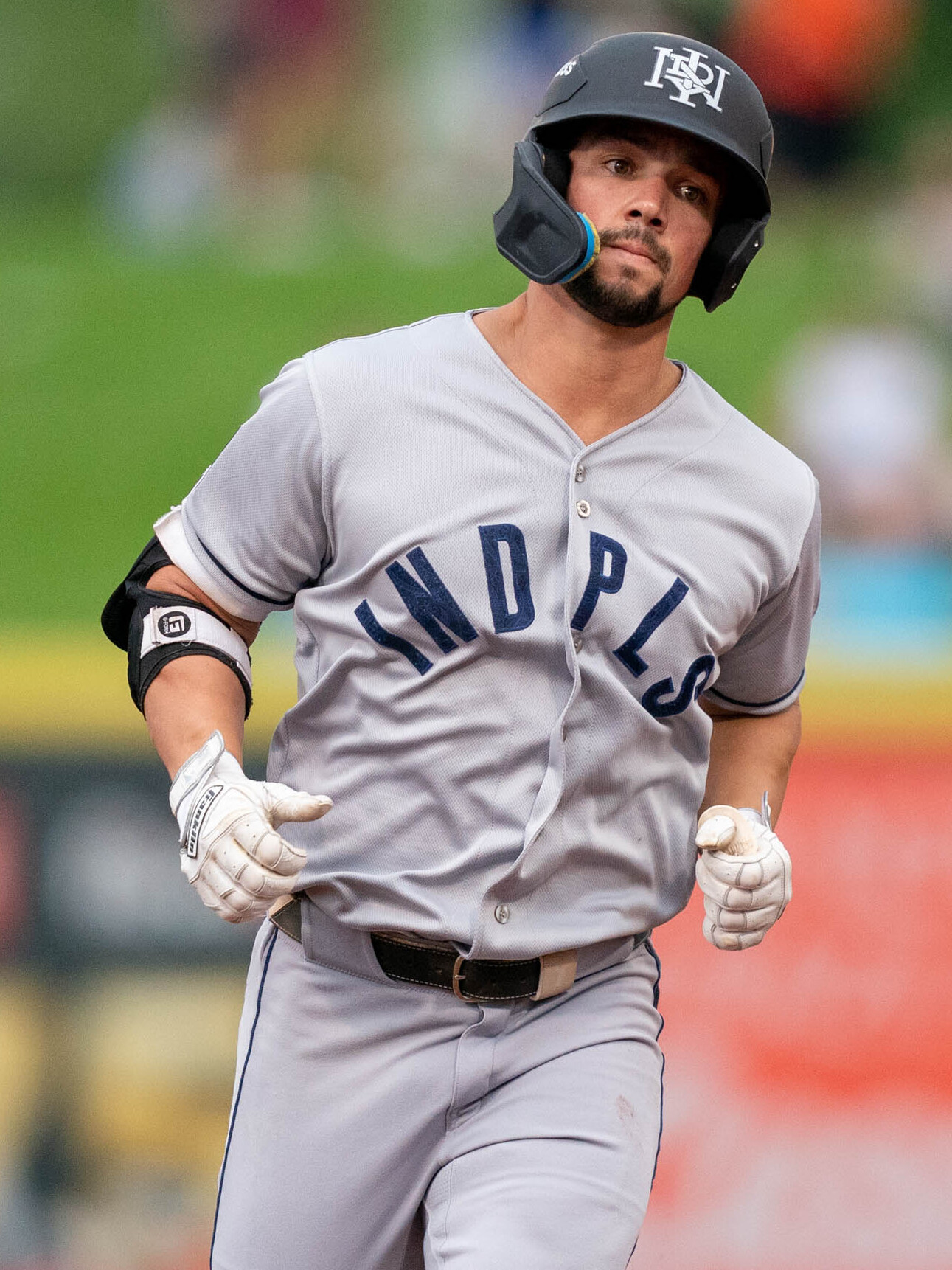
- Fletcher with the Indianapolis Indians in 2026

Free agent
- Outfielder
- Born: September 2, 1997 (age 29); Orange, California, U.S.
- Bats: Left Throws: Left

MLB debut
- April 30, 2023, for the Arizona Diamondbacks

MLB statistics (through 2025 season)
- Batting average: .233
- Home runs: 4
- Runs batted in: 33
- Stats at Baseball Reference

Teams
- Arizona Diamondbacks (2023); Chicago White Sox (2024–2025)

Dominic Paul Fletcher (born September 2, 1997) is an American professional baseball outfielder who is a free agent. He has previously played in Major League Baseball (MLB) for the Arizona Diamondbacks and Chicago White Sox.

== Amateur career ==
Fletcher attended Cypress High School in Cypress, California. As a senior in 2015, he was named the Orange County Register Player of the Year after batting .365 with 27 runs batted in (RBI).

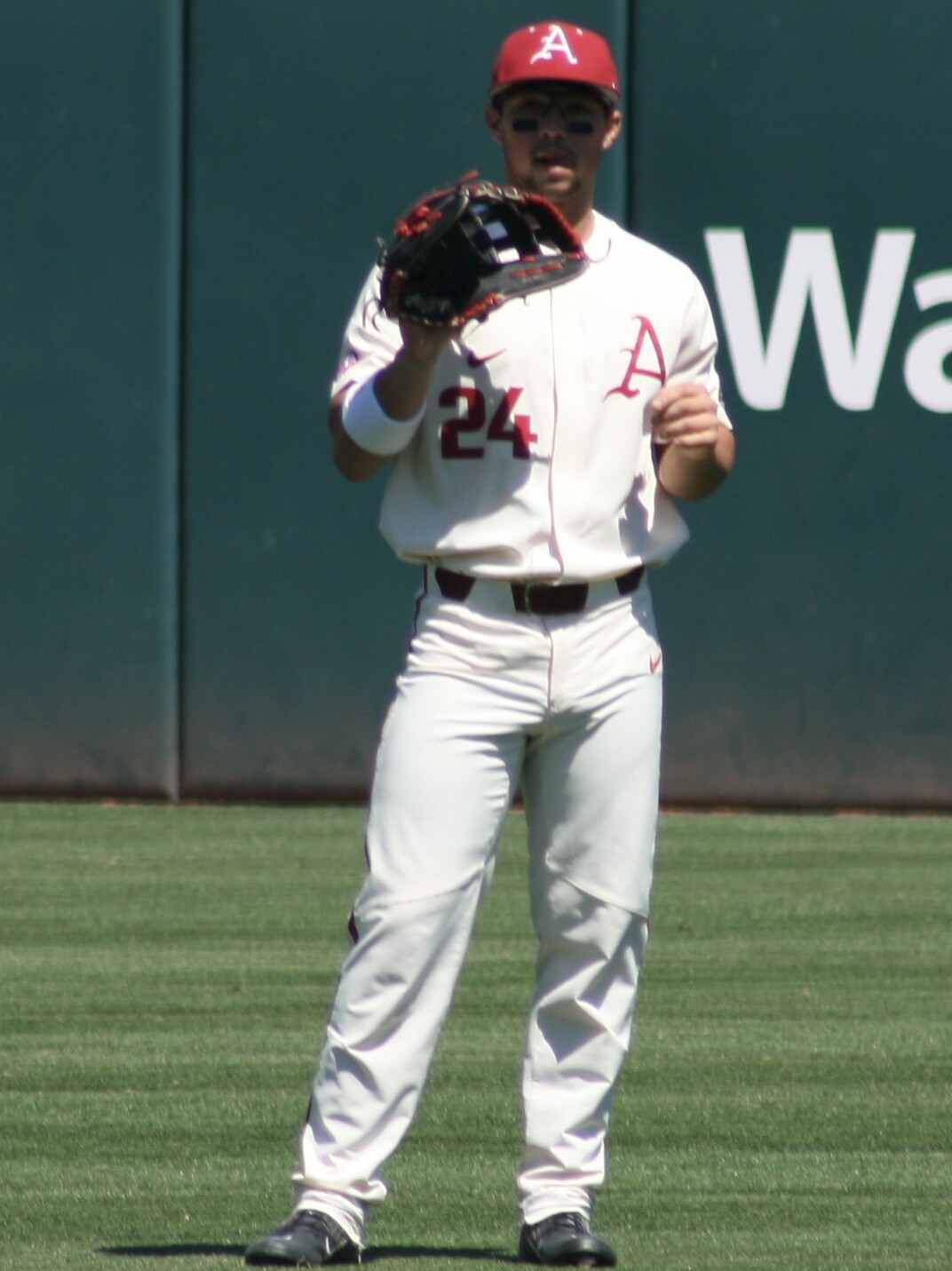
Fletcher with Arkansas in 2019

After graduating, he enrolled at the University of Arkansas where he played college baseball for the Arkansas Razorbacks. As a freshman, Fletcher started 56 games in center field and hit .291 with 64 hits, 12 home runs, and 37 RBI, earning freshman All-American honors from the National Collegiate Baseball Writers Association and Baseball America, and the Southeastern Conference All-Freshman Team. In 2019, his junior year, he hit .317/.386/.537 with 11 home runs and 61 RBI over 64 games.

== Professional career ==
=== Arizona Diamondbacks ===
The Arizona Diamondbacks selected Fletcher in the second round, with the 75th overall selection, of the 2019 Major League Baseball draft. Fletcher signed with Arizona and made his professional debut with the Kane County Cougars of the Single–A Midwest League. Over 55 games, he hit .318 with five home runs, 28 RBI, and 14 doubles. Fletcher was assigned to the Amarillo Sod Poodles of the Double-A South for the 2021 season and slashed .264/.314/.445 with 15 home runs and 56 RBI over 102 games. He returned to Amarillo to begin the 2022 season. After 32 games, he was promoted to the Reno Aces of the Triple-A Pacific Coast League. Over 133 games between the two teams, he slashed .312/.378/.486 with 12 home runs, 72 RBI, and 35 doubles.

On November 15, 2022, the Diamondbacks selected Fletcher's contract and added him to the 40-man roster to protect him from the Rule 5 draft. Fletcher was optioned to Triple-A Reno to begin the 2023 season. He played in 22 games for Reno, batting .323/.417/.559 with three home runs and 13 RBI. On April 30, Fletcher was promoted to the major leagues for the first time after Corbin Carroll suffered a left knee contusion. While on optional assignment with Triple–A Reno, Fletcher was placed on the injured list with an undisclosed injury on August 25. On September 4, he was transferred to the 60–day injured list, with the injury revealed as a fractured left index finger. The transaction ended his season, in which he played in 28 games and batted .301/.350/.441 with two home runs and 14 RBI.

=== Chicago White Sox ===
On February 3, 2024, the Diamondbacks traded Fletcher to the Chicago White Sox in exchange for Cristian Mena. In 72 appearances for the White Sox, Fletcher slashed .206/.252/.256 with one home run and 17 RBI.

Fletcher was optioned to the Triple-A Charlotte Knights to begin the 2025 season. He was designated for assignment by the White Sox on March 27, 2025. Fletcher cleared waivers and was sent outright to Charlotte on March 31. In 105 appearances for Charlotte, he batted .260/.317/.453 with 17 home runs, 68 RBI, and seven stolen bases. On September 5, the White Sox selected Fletcher's contract, adding him to their active roster. In 12 games for Chicago, he batted .219/.265/.469 with one home run, two RBI, and one stolen base. On October 13, Fletcher was removed from the 40-man roster and sent outright to Triple-A Charlotte. He elected free agency on October 15.

=== Pittsburgh Pirates ===
On December 22, 2025, Fletcher signed a minor league contract with the Pittsburgh Pirates. He was released by the Pirates organization on July 4. On July 17, Fletcher re–signed with Pittsburgh on a new minor league contract. He was released again by the Pirates on August 18. He played in 63 games with the Triple-A Indianapolis Indians and hit .301 with eight home runs and 32 RBI.

=== Cincinnati Reds ===
On September 3, 2026, Fletcher signed a minor league contract with the Cincinnati Reds. He was assigned to the Triple-A Louisville Bats. In 14 games he batted .149/.241/.149 with no home runs and 3 RBIs. He elected free agency on November 2.

== International career ==
Fletcher played for the Italy national baseball team at the 2023 World Baseball Classic.

== Personal life ==
Fletcher's brother, David, played in MLB from 2018 to 2024 for the Los Angeles Angels and Atlanta Braves. Their father Tim died on June 12, 2023. Fletcher married Emily Edwards on November 27, 2024.
