= Yilber Díaz =

Venezuelan baseball player (born 2000)

Detroit Tigers
- Pitcher
- Born: August 19, 2000 (age 26); Guatire, Venezuela
- Bats: Right Throws: Right

MLB debut
- July 8, 2024, for the Arizona Diamondbacks

MLB statistics (through 2026 season)
- Win–loss record: 1–1
- Earned run average: 6.27
- Strikeouts: 26
- Stats at Baseball Reference

Teams
- Arizona Diamondbacks (2024–2026); Detroit Tigers (2026)

Yilber Daniel Díaz (born August 19, 2000) is a Venezuelan professional baseball pitcher in the Detroit Tigers organization. He made his MLB debut in 2024 with the Arizona Diamondbacks.

== Career ==
=== Arizona Diamondbacks ===
Díaz signed with the Arizona Diamondbacks as an international free agent on February 5, 2021. He made his professional debut that year with the Dominican Summer League Diamondbacks. Díaz split the 2022 season between the Single–A Visalia Rawhide and High–A Hillsboro Hops, accumulating a 4–3 record and 4.06 ERA with 99 strikeouts across 19 total games (17 starts).

Díaz spent the majority of the 2023 campaign with Hillsboro, also making 3 starts for the Double–A Amarillo Sod Poodles. In 22 starts with the Hops, he compiled a 2–10 record and 5.03 ERA with 124 strikeouts across 87 2/3 innings pitched.

Díaz started the 2024 season with Amarillo before being promoted to the Triple–A Reno Aces. On July 8, 2024, Díaz was selected to the 40-man roster and promoted to the major leagues for the first time. That same day, he faced the Atlanta Braves, pitching six innings of an eventual 5–4 loss. Díaz made 7 appearances (4 starts) for the Diamondbacks during his rookie campaign, logging a 1–1 record and 3.81 ERA with 19 strikeouts across 28 1/3 innings pitched.

Díaz was optioned to Triple-A Reno to begin the 2025 season. He made 21 appearances (including eight starts) for Reno, but struggled to a 1–3 record and 11.63 ERA with 49 strikeouts over 41 innings of work.

Díaz was again optioned to Triple-A Reno to begin the 2026 season. He made his only appearance for Arizona on June 20, 2026, allowing seven earned runs in 2/3 of an inning pitched against the Minnesota Twins. The following day, Díaz was designated for assignment by the Diamondbacks.

=== Detroit Tigers ===
On June 26, 2026, Díaz was claimed off waivers by the Detroit Tigers. He made four appearances for Detroit, struggling to a 6.75 ERA with six strikeouts across 5 1/3 innings pitched. Díaz was designated for assignment by the Tigers on November 2. On November 6, he cleared waivers and was sent outright to Triple-A Toledo.
