= Joe Jacques (baseball) =

American baseball player (born 1995)

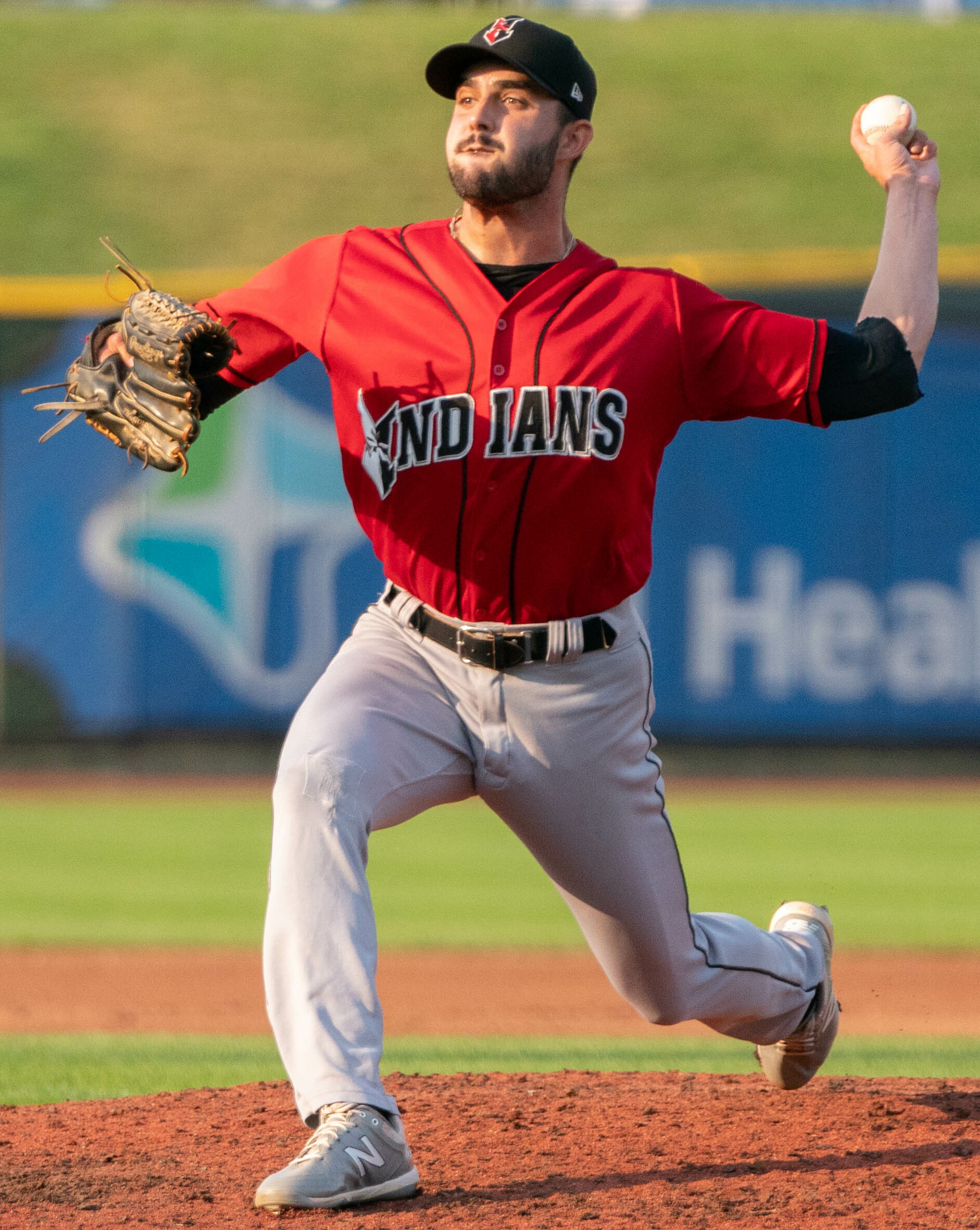
- Jacques with the Indianapolis Indians in 2022

Free agent
- Pitcher
- Born: March 11, 1995 (age 31); Shrewsbury, New Jersey, U.S.
- Bats: Left Throws: Left

MLB debut
- June 12, 2023, for the Boston Red Sox

MLB statistics (through 2024 season)
- Win–loss record: 2–1
- Earned run average: 5.46
- Strikeouts: 22
- Stats at Baseball Reference

Teams
- Boston Red Sox (2023–2024); Arizona Diamondbacks (2024)

Joseph Jacques (born March 11, 1995) is an American professional baseball pitcher who is a free agent. He has previously played in Major League Baseball (MLB) for the Boston Red Sox and Arizona Diamondbacks.

== Early life ==
Jacques is from Shrewsbury, New Jersey. He attended Red Bank Regional High School and Manhattan College, where he played college baseball for the Manhattan Jaspers, joining the team as a walk-on. He also played collegiate summer baseball during 2016 in the New England Collegiate Baseball League for the Vermont Mountaineers. Jacques graduated from Manhattan College in 2018.

== Career ==
=== Pittsburgh Pirates ===
The Pittsburgh Pirates selected Jacques in the 33rd round, with the 984th overall selection, of the 2018 Major League Baseball draft. He spent his first professional season with the rookie–level Bristol Pirates, also appearing in one game for the Low–A West Virginia Black Bears, and struggled to a 6.33 ERA across 17 appearances.

Jacques split the 2019 season between the Single–A Greensboro Grasshoppers, High–A Bradenton Marauders, and Double-A Altoona Curve. In 35 total appearances, he accumulated a 4–4 record and 2.58 ERA with 59 strikeouts in 66 1/3 innings pitched. Jacques did not play in a game in 2020 due to the cancellation of the minor league season because of the COVID-19 pandemic.

In 2021, Jacques played for the Triple-A Indianapolis Indians. In 37 appearances out of the bullpen, Jacques recorded a 4.31 ERA with 53 strikeouts across 48 innings pitched. He spent the majority of the 2022 season with Indianapolis, pitching to a 5–1 record and 3.12 ERA with 35 strikeouts and 3 saves in 43 1/3 innings of work across 33 contests.

=== Boston Red Sox ===
On December 7, 2022, the Boston Red Sox selected Jacques from the Pirates in the minor league phase of the Rule 5 draft. He began the 2023 season in Triple-A with the Worcester Red Sox. On June 9, 2023, Jacques was selected to the 40-man roster and promoted to the major leagues for the first time. He made his major league debut on June 12, earned his first major-league win on June 16, and earned his first major-league save on July 2. Jacques was optioned back to Worcester on July 29, recalled to Boston on August 29, and returned to Worcester on September 10.

Jacques was optioned to Triple–A Worcester to begin the 2024 season. He made one appearance for the club, against the Cleveland Guardians, allowing one run in 1 2/3 innings of work. On April 19, Jacques was designated for assignment to clear a roster spot for Cam Booser.

=== Arizona Diamondbacks ===
On April 23, 2024, Jacques was claimed off waivers by the Arizona Diamondbacks. He made one appearance for Arizona, allowing two runs in 1 1/3 innings of relief against the San Diego Padres. Jacques was designated for assignment following the acquisition of A. J. Puk on July 25. He cleared waivers and was sent outright to the Triple–A Reno Aces on July 30. Jacques elected free agency following the season, on November 4.

=== Los Angeles Dodgers ===
On November 16, 2024, Jacques signed a minor league contract with the Los Angeles Dodgers. He pitched in 22 1/3 innings over 18 appearances for the Triple-A Oklahoma City Comets, posting a 1-1 record and 6.04 ERA with 24 strikeouts and three saves.

=== Seattle Mariners ===
On June 2, 2025, Jacques was traded to the Seattle Mariners in exchange for Will Klein. On July 2, the Mariners selected Jacques' contract, adding him to their active roster. He did not make an appearance for the team and returned to the Triple-A Tacoma Rainiers, where he struggled to a 6.93 ERA with 29 strikeouts across 24 appearances. Jacques was designated for assignment by Seattle on September 3. He cleared waivers and was sent outright to Triple-A Tacoma on September 5. Jacques elected free agency on October 1.

=== New York Mets ===
On October 15, 2025, Jacques signed a minor league contract with the New York Mets. He made 30 appearances for the High–A Brooklyn Cyclones and Triple–A Syracuse Mets in 2026, posting a cumulative 5–1 record and 5.10 ERA with 29 strikeouts and two saves over 30 innings of work. Jacques was released by the Mets organization on September 9, 2026.

== See also ==
- Rule 5 draft results
