= Jorge Barrosa =

Venezuelan baseball player (born 2001)

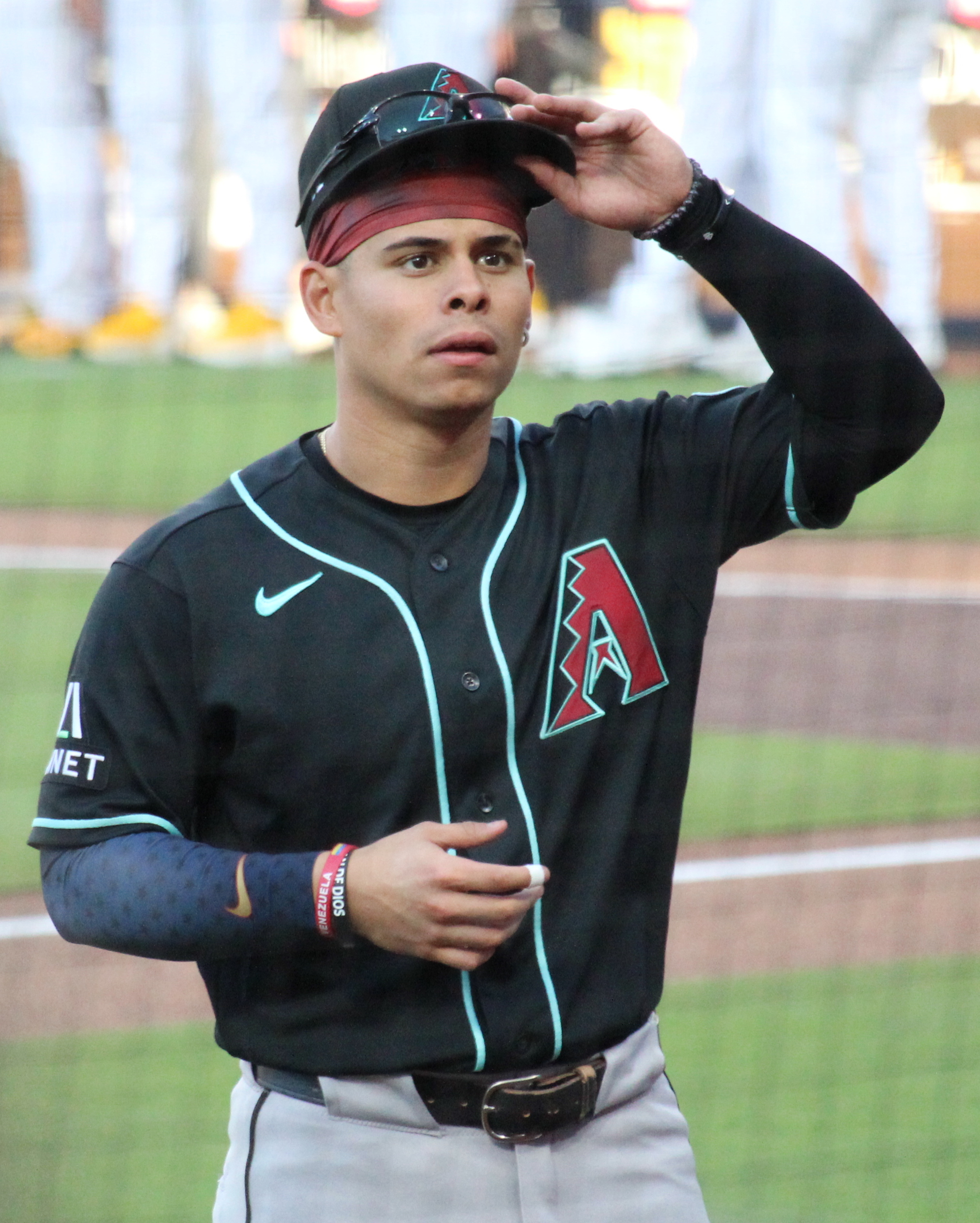
- Barrosa in 2026

Houston Astros
- Outfielder
- Born: February 17, 2001 (age 25); Puerto Cabello, Venezuela
- Bats: Switch Throws: Left

MLB debut
- April 1, 2024, for the Arizona Diamondbacks

MLB statistics (through 2026 season)
- Batting average: .176
- Home runs: 3
- Runs batted in: 20
- Stats at Baseball Reference

Teams
- Arizona Diamondbacks (2024–2026); Houston Astros (2026)

Jorge Luis Barrosa (born February 17, 2001) is a Venezuelan professional baseball outfielder in the Houston Astros organization. He has previously played in Major League Baseball (MLB) for the Arizona Diamondbacks.

== Career ==
=== Arizona Diamondbacks ===
Barrosa signed with the Arizona Diamondbacks as an international free agent on July 2, 2017. He made his professional debut in 2018, appearing in 68 games for Arizona’s rookie-level affiliates. In 2019, Barrosa spent the year with the Low-A Hillsboro Hops, slashing .251/.335/.336 with one home run, 26 RBI, and eight stolen bases.

Barrosa did not play in a game in 2020 due to the cancellation of the minor league season because of the COVID-19 pandemic. He spent the 2021 season with High-A Hillsboro and the Single-A Visalia Rawhide, hitting a cumulative .285/.353/.422 with 7 home runs, 37 RBI, and 29 stolen bases across 96 games. In 2022, Barrosa played in 120 games split between Hillsboro and the Double-A Amarillo Sod Poodles, batting .279/.372/.439 with 26 stolen bases and career-highs in home runs (13) and RBI (57).

On November 15, 2022, the Diamondbacks added Barrosa to their 40-man roster to protect him from the Rule 5 draft. After suffering a hamstring strain in spring training, Barrosa was optioned to the Triple-A Reno Aces to begin the 2023 season. In 120 games for Reno, he hit .274/.394/.456 with 13 home runs, 65 RBI, and 15 stolen bases.

Barrosa was again optioned to Triple–A Reno to begin the 2024 season. After two games for Reno, Barrosa was promoted to the major leagues for the first time. In 8 appearances for the Diamondbacks during his rookie campaign, Barrosa went 3-for-17 (.176) with one RBI and one stolen base.

Barrosa was optioned to Triple-A Reno to begin the 2025 season. On September 21, 2025, Barrosa hit his first career home run, a solo shot off of Philadelphia Phillies reliever Tim Mayza.

Barrosa made 97 appearances for Arizona during the 2026 season, slashing .201/.285/.343 with two home runs, 12 RBI, and three stolen bases. On September 4, 2026, Barrosa was designated for assignment by the Diamondbacks.

=== Houston Astros ===
On September 6, 2026, Barrosa was claimed off of waivers by the Houston Astros. He made eight appearances for the Astros, going 1-for-11 at the plate with a double and three walks; he played seven games in left field and one each in center and right field. On September 19, Barrosa was designated for assignment by Houston. He cleared waivers and was sent outright to the Triple–A Sugar Land Space Cowboys on September 22.
