= Cristian Mena =

Dominican baseball player (born 2002)

Arizona Diamondbacks – No. 64
- Pitcher
- Born: December 21, 2002 (age 23); San Francisco de Macoris, Dominican Republic
- Bats: Right Throws: Right

MLB debut
- July 3, 2024, for the Arizona Diamondbacks

MLB statistics (through 2025 season)
- Win–loss record: 1–0
- Earned run average: 4.66
- Strikeouts: 10
- Stats at Baseball Reference

Teams
- Arizona Diamondbacks (2024–2025)

Cristian José Mena (born December 21, 2002) is a Dominican professional baseball pitcher for the Arizona Diamondbacks of Major League Baseball (MLB). He made his MLB debut in 2024.

== Career ==
=== Chicago White Sox ===
Mena signed with the Chicago White Sox as an international free agent on July 2, 2019. He did not play in a game in 2020 due to the cancellation of the minor league season because of the COVID-19 pandemic. He made his professional debut in 2021 with the rookie–level Arizona Complex League White Sox, logging a 7.82 ERA with 62 strikeouts over 13 games (12 starts).

Mena began the 2022 campaign with the Single–A Kannapolis Intimidators before later being promoted to the High–A Winston-Salem Dash and Double–A Birmingham Barons. In 24 starts split between the three affiliates, he accumulated a 2–6 record and 3.80 ERA with 126 strikeouts across 104 1/3 innings pitched.

Mena split the 2023 season between Birmingham and the Triple–A Charlotte Knights. In 27 total starts, he compiled a cumulative 8–7 record and 4.85 ERA with 156 strikeouts across 133 2/3 innings of work. On November 14, 2023, the White Sox added Mena to their 40-man roster to protect him from the Rule 5 draft.

=== Arizona Diamondbacks ===
The White Sox traded Mena to the Arizona Diamondbacks on February 3, 2024, in exchange for Dominic Fletcher. He was optioned to the Triple–A Reno Aces to begin the 2024 season. On July 3, Mena was promoted to the major leagues for the first time. He made his major league debut the same day against the Los Angeles Dodgers, allowing four runs on four hits with two strikeouts over three innings. On August 2, it was announced that Mena would likely miss the remainder of the season after suffering a right forearm strain.

Mena was optioned to Triple-A Reno to begin the 2025 season. He was recalled to the Diamondbacks on June 1, 2025. In three appearances for Arizona, Mena posted a 1–0 record and 1.35 ERA with eight strikeouts across 6 2/3 innings pitched. He was placed on the injured list on June 7, due to a teres major strain. Mena was transferred to the 60-day injured list on June 10.

On March 25, 2026, Mena was placed on the 60-day injured list due to a right shoulder strain. On June 2, it was announced that Mena would undergo shoulder surgery, likely ending his season.
