= Adrian Del Castillo =

American baseball player (born 1999)

Arizona Diamondbacks – No. 25
- Catcher
- Born: September 27, 1999 (age 27); Miami, Florida, U.S.
- Bats: Left Throws: Right

MLB debut
- August 7, 2024, for the Arizona Diamondbacks

MLB statistics (through 2026 season)
- Batting average: .234
- Home runs: 13
- Runs batted in: 60
- Stats at Baseball Reference

Teams
- Arizona Diamondbacks (2024–present)

Adrian Jose Del Castillo (born September 27, 1999) is an American professional baseball catcher for the Arizona Diamondbacks of Major League Baseball (MLB). He made his MLB debut in 2024.

== Amateur career ==
Del Castillo attended Gulliver Preparatory School in Miami, Florida, where he played baseball. As a senior in 2018, he hit .527 with 15 home runs and 35 runs batted in (RBI). He was selected by the Chicago White Sox in the 36th round of the 2018 Major League Baseball draft, but did not sign and instead enrolled at the University of Miami.

In 2019, Del Castillo's freshman season with the Miami Hurricanes, he started 61 games and had a .331/.418/.576 slash line with 12 home runs and 72 RBI. He spent a majority of his time in right field but also spent time at catcher, third base, and designated hitter. He was named to the All-Atlantic Coast Conference Freshman Team and Second Team alongside earning Freshman-All American honors from various outlets. That summer, he played in the Cape Cod Baseball League for the Wareham Gatemen. For his sophomore season in 2020, Del Castillo was expected to shift primarily to catching. He hit .358 with two home runs and 15 RBI over 16 starts before the college baseball season was cut short due to the COVID-19 pandemic. For the 2021 season, Del Castillo appeared in 54 games and batted .275 with three home runs and 37 RBI.

== Professional career ==
The Arizona Diamondbacks selected Del Castillo in the second round, with the 67th overall selection, of the 2021 Major League Baseball draft. He signed with the club for a $1 million signing bonus. To begin his professional career, he was assigned to the Rookie-level Arizona Complex League Diamondbacks before being promoted to the Visalia Rawhide of the Low-A West after two games. Over 24 games for the 2021 season, Del Castillo slashed .265/.367/.422 with one home run, 14 RBI, and six doubles.

Del Castillo was assigned to the Hillsboro Hops of the High-A Northwest League to begin the 2022 season, but also played briefly with the ACL Diamondbacks and Visalia. Over 86 games between the three teams, he batted .210 with seven home runs and 31 RBI. Del Castillo opened the 2023 season with the Amarillo Sod Poodles of the Double-A Texas League and was promoted to the Reno Aces of the Triple-A Pacific Coast League in mid-July. Over 100 games, he hit .263 with 14 home runs and 68 RBI.

Del Castillo was assigned to Reno to open the 2024 season. In 100 games for Reno, he batted .319/.403/.608 with 24 home runs and 70 RBI. After the season, he won the Pacific Coast League Most Valuable Player Award for his performance with the Aces.

On August 6, 2024, Del Castillo was selected to the 40-man roster and promoted to the major leagues for the first time. On August 9, against the Philadelphia Phillies, Del Castillo became the first Diamondbacks player in franchise history to have a walk-off home run as their first in the major leagues. On August 19, against the Miami Marlins, Del Castillo hit his first career grand slam and recorded six RBI in front of his friends and family in his hometown of Miami. Across 25 games during his rookie campaign, Del Castillo slashed .313/.368/.525 with four home runs and 19 RBI.

Del Castillo was optioned to Reno to begin the 2025 season. He missed time during the season due to a shoulder injury and back spasms and had two stints on the injured list. Del Castillo played in 44 games for the Diamondbacks during the season and hit .242 with four home runs and 17 RBI. He appeared in 28 minor league games between the ACL Diamondbacks and Reno.

Del Castillo arrived at 2026 spring training sidelined with a calf injury and began the season on the injured list. He began his return to play program, running, and defensive work in March. He missed the first week of the MLB season before he was activated and returned to Arizona's roster on April 3. With the Diamondbacks, Del Castillo appeared in 64 games and batted .193 with five home runs and 24 RBI. He also played 32 games with Reno and hit .280 with eight home runs.
