= Justin Martínez (baseball) =

Dominican baseball player (born 2001)

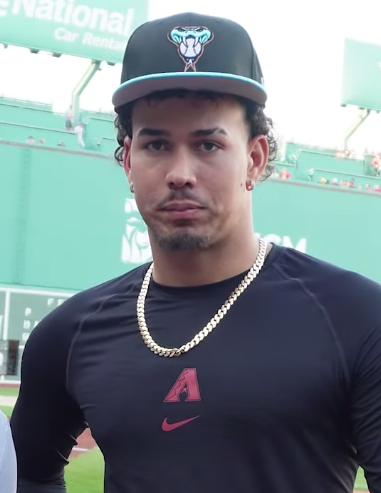
- Martínez with the Arizona Diamondbacks in 2024

Arizona Diamondbacks – No. 63
- Pitcher
- Born: July 30, 2001 (age 25); Bonao, Dominican Republic
- Bats: Right Throws: Right

MLB debut
- July 7, 2023, for the Arizona Diamondbacks

MLB statistics (through 2026 season)
- Win–loss record: 9–9
- Earned run average: 3.56
- Strikeouts: 145
- Stats at Baseball Reference

Teams
- Arizona Diamondbacks (2023–present)

Career highlights and awards
- Pitched an immaculate inning on September 11, 2026

Justin Martínez (born July 30, 2001) is a Dominican professional baseball pitcher for the Arizona Diamondbacks of Major League Baseball (MLB). He made his MLB debut in 2023.

== Career ==
Martínez signed with the Arizona Diamondbacks as an international free agent on March 5, 2018. He made his professional debut with the Dominican Summer League Diamondbacks. Martínez split the 2019 season between the DSL Diamondbacks, rookie–level Arizona League Diamondbacks, and rookie–level Missoula Osprey. In 18 games (10 starts) between the three affiliates, he recorded a 2.89 ERA with 78 strikeouts across 56 innings of work. Martínez did not play in a game in 2020 due to the cancellation of the minor league season because of the COVID-19 pandemic.

Martínez began the 2021 season with the Single–A Visalia Rawhide, but underwent Tommy John surgery after only 7 starts. In 2022, he returned from the injury partway through the year. In 20 games split between the rookie–level Arizona Complex League Diamondbacks, High–A Hillsboro Hops, Double–A Amarillo Sod Poodles, and Triple–A Reno Aces, he accumulated a 3.32 ERA with 62 strikeouts in 38 innings of work. After the season, Martínez played in the Arizona Fall League, making it to the league's all-star game in November. On November 15, 2022, the Diamondbacks added Martínez to their 40-man roster to protect him from the Rule 5 draft.

Martínez was optioned to the Triple-A Reno Aces to begin the 2023 season. In 25 games for the Triple–A Reno Aces, he posted a 4.18 ERA with 38 strikeouts and 5 saves in 28 innings of work. On June 27, 2023, Martínez was promoted to the major leagues for the first time. He went unused out of the bullpen and was optioned back to Reno on June 29, becoming a phantom ballplayer. He was promoted for a second time on July 7, making his MLB debut the same day, allowing two runs in one inning against the Pittsburgh Pirates. In 10 games during his rookie campaign, Martínez struggled to a 12.60 ERA with 14 strikeouts across 10 innings pitched.

Martínez was again optioned to Triple–A Reno to begin the 2024 season. He made 64 appearances for the Diamondbacks, posting a 5–6 record and 2.48 ERA with 91 strikeouts and 8 saves across 72 2/3 innings pitched.

On March 21, 2025, Martínez and the Diamondbacks agreed to a five-year, $18 million contract extension. In 17 appearances for the team, he compiled a 1–2 record and 4.11 ERA with 22 strikeouts and five saves across 15 1/3 innings pitched. On June 10, Martínez was placed on the injured list due to a right UCL sprain. Three days later, it was announced that Martínez would undergo Tommy John surgery, ending his season.

On August 17, 2026, Martínez was activated from the injured list for his season debut and return from surgery. Martínez pitched an immaculate inning against the Texas Rangers on September 11, in the bottom of the sixth inning. It was the fifth in franchise history and the second of the Diamondback's 2026 season following Michael Soroka on March 30. Martinez threw out the side against Wyatt Langford, Evan Carter, and Jake Burger.
