= Brandon Pfaadt =

American baseball player (born 1998)

Arizona Diamondbacks – No. 32
- Pitcher
- Born: October 15, 1998 (age 27); Louisville, Kentucky, U.S.
- Bats: Right Throws: Right

MLB debut
- May 3, 2023, for the Arizona Diamondbacks

MLB statistics (through 2026 season)
- Win–loss record: 35–31
- Earned run average: 4.82
- Strikeouts: 520
- Stats at Baseball Reference

Teams
- Arizona Diamondbacks (2023–present)

Brandon Connor Pfaadt (/fɑːt/ FAHT; born October 15, 1998) is an American professional baseball pitcher for the Arizona Diamondbacks of Major League Baseball (MLB). He made his MLB debut in 2023.

== Amateur career ==
Pfaadt attended Trinity High School in Louisville, Kentucky, and played college baseball at Bellarmine University. In 2018, he played summer league baseball for the Mankato MoonDogs of the Northwoods League. In 2019, he played with the Wareham Gatemen of the Cape Cod Baseball League.

== Professional career ==
The Arizona Diamondbacks selected Pfaadt in the fifth round of the 2020 Major League Baseball draft. The draft had been shortened to five rounds that year due to the COVID-19 pandemic, and the Diamondbacks selected Pfaadt over two other prospects because he agreed to an under-slot $100,000 signing bonus. Pfaadt made his professional debut in 2021 with the Visalia Rawhide and was promoted to the Hillsboro Hops and Amarillo Sod Poodles during the season. Over 22 starts between the three teams, he went 8–7 with a 3.21 ERA and 160 strikeouts over 131 2/3 innings.

In 2022 in 29 starts split between Double-A Amarillo and the Triple-A Reno Aces, he was 11–7 with a 3.83 ERA, and led the minors in innings pitched, with 167, as well as strikeouts, with 218. Pfaadt began the 2023 season in Reno, posting a 3.91 ERA with 30 strikeouts across 5 starts.

On May 3, 2023, Pfaadt was selected to the 40-man roster and promoted to the major leagues for the first time to serve as the starting pitcher against the Texas Rangers.

That year, the Diamondbacks made the postseason and Pfaadt was tabbed to start five games. He started Game 1 of the Wild Card Series versus the Milwaukee Brewers and allowed three runs (all earned) in 2.2 innings of work, although the Diamondbacks later won. In the four games Pfaadt started as Arizona made their way to the NL pennant, he didn't receive a decision in any of them and had just one start that lasted longer than four innings (Game 3 of the NLCS) but Arizona didn't lose any of the games. He was then tabbed to start Game 3 of the 2023 World Series against the Texas Rangers, where he gave up three runs on 5.1 innings pitched as the Rangers won 3-1 and Pfaadt received the loss. In total, Pfaadt pitched 22 total innings in the postseason and allowed eight total runs with 26 strikeouts and 5 walks.

On March 28, 2025, Pfaadt and the Diamondbacks agreed to a five-year contract extension worth $45 million. On May 31, Pfaadt allowed eight runs on six hits and two hit batters, failing to record an out against the Washington Nationals, who scored 10 runs in the first inning. His performance was criticized as a "yes-hitter" in the press, as the opposing team was allowed to accomplish a feat that had not happened since 1948. On September 17, Pfaadt allowed no runs and one hit over nine innings, despite the Diamondbacks losing 5–1 in 11 innings to the Giants. Pfaadt's game score was 91, the highest for any start of his career.

After starting the 2026 season with a 5.92 ERA, Pfaadt was sent back down to Triple-A Reno. He was recalled on June 30, and began a huge mid-season resurgence, having an ERA of 1.32 over his next 8 starts, not allowing a single earned run between July 23 and August 14.

== Personal life ==
Pfaadt and his wife, Ali, were married in November 2024 in Louisville.
