= Blake Walston =

American baseball player (born 2001)

Free agent
- Pitcher
- Born: June 28, 2001 (age 25); Wilmington, North Carolina, U.S.
- Bats: Left Throws: Left

MLB debut
- May 1, 2024, for the Arizona Diamondbacks

MLB statistics (through 2026 season)
- Win–loss record: 2–0
- Earned run average: 4.22
- Strikeouts: 20
- Stats at Baseball Reference

Teams
- Arizona Diamondbacks (2024, 2026)

Matthew Blake Walston (born June 28, 2001) is an American professional baseball pitcher who is a free agent. He has previously played in Major League Baseball (MLB) for the Arizona Diamondbacks. He made his MLB debut in 2024.

== Career ==
Walston attended New Hanover High School in Wilmington, North Carolina. In 2019, his senior year, he went 12–0 with a 0.20 ERA, striking out 129 batters in 68 2/3 innings pitched. He was named North Carolina's Gatorade Baseball Player of the Year. Walston was also named the 2019 North Carolina High School Player of the Year by Perfect Game. He committed to play college baseball at North Carolina State University.

The Arizona Diamondbacks chose Walston in the first round, with the 26th overall pick, in the 2019 Major League Baseball draft. He signed for $2.45 million. He made his professional debut with the Rookie-level Arizona League Diamondbacks before earning a promotion to the Hillsboro Hops of the Low–A Northwest League. Over 11 innings between both teams, he compiled a 2.45 ERA and 17 strikeouts. He did not play a minor league game in 2020 due to the cancellation of the minor league season caused by the COVID-19 pandemic. To begin the 2021 season, he was assigned to the Visalia Rawhide of the Low-A West. He was promoted to Hillsboro (now members of the High-A West) in July. Over 19 starts between the two teams, Walston went 4–5 with a 3.76 ERA and 117 strikeouts over 95 2/3 innings.

On November 14, 2023, the Diamondbacks added Walston to their 40-man roster to protect him from the Rule 5 draft. He was optioned to the Triple–A Reno Aces to begin the 2024 season. On May 1, 2024, Walston was promoted to the major leagues for the first time. In 7 games (2 starts) for the Diamondbacks during his rookie campaign, Walston logged a 1-0 record and 4.42 ERA with 18 strikeouts across 18 1/3 innings pitched.

On March 14, 2025, it was announced that Walston would undergo Tommy John surgery and miss the entirety of the 2025 season. On March 25, 2026, Walston was placed on the 60-day injured list as he continued to recover from surgery. He was activated for his season debut and return from surgery on September 1.

On November 20, 2026, Ralston was non-tendered by the Diamondbacks and became a free agent.
