= Arizona Diamondbacks =

Major League Baseball franchise in Phoenix, Arizona

- 2026 Arizona Diamondbacks season

Logo	Cap insignia
- Established in 1998

Major league affiliations
- National League (1998–present); West Division (1998–present)

Current uniform
- Retired numbers: 20; 51; 42

Colors
- Sedona red, teal, black, white

Name
- Arizona Diamondbacks (1998–present)

Nicknames
- The D-backs; Los Serpientes; The Answerbacks

Ballpark
- Chase Field (1998–present)

Major league titles
- World Series titles (1): 2001
- NL pennants (2): 2001; 2023
- West division titles (5): 1999; 2001; 2002; 2007; 2011
- Wild card berths (2): 2017; 2023

Front office
- Principal owner: Ken Kendrick
- President: Derrick Hall
- President of baseball operations: Mike Hazen
- General manager: Mike Hazen
- Manager: Torey Lovullo
- Mascot: D. Baxter the Bobcat
- Website: mlb.com/dbacks

The Arizona Diamondbacks (often referred to as the D-backs) are an American professional baseball team based in Phoenix, Arizona. The Diamondbacks compete in Major League Baseball (MLB) as a member club of the National League (NL) West Division. The franchise was established on March 9, 1995 and began play in 1998 as an expansion team. The team plays its home games at Chase Field. Along with the Tampa Bay Rays, the Diamondbacks are one of the newest teams in MLB and are the youngest team to win a World Series, doing so in only their fourth season of existence in 2001.

After a fifth-place finish in their inaugural season, the Diamondbacks made several off-season acquisitions, including future Hall of Fame pitcher Randy Johnson, who won four consecutive Cy Young Awards in his first four seasons with the team. In 1999, Arizona won 100 games and their first division championship. In 2001, they won the World Series over the three-time defending champion New York Yankees, becoming the fastest expansion team in MLB history to win the World Series and the first and only men's major professional sports team in Arizona to win a championship. Twenty-two years later they won their second NLCS and returned to the World Series, losing to the Texas Rangers.

From 1998 to 2026, the Diamondbacks have had an overall record of 2,253–2,343 (.490).

== History ==
On March 9, 1995, Phoenix was awarded an expansion franchise to begin play for the 1998 season. A $130 million franchise fee was paid to Major League Baseball (MLB). On January 16, 1997, owners of existing MLB teams voted to put the Diamondbacks in the National League. The Diamondbacks' first major league game was played against the Colorado Rockies on March 31, 1998, at Bank One Ballpark. The ballpark was renamed Chase Field in 2005, as a result of Bank One's merger with JPMorgan Chase.

Since their debut, the Diamondbacks have won two Wild Card Series, five NL West division titles, two NL pennants, and the 2001 World Series. They were the fastest expansion franchise in baseball history to win a World Series after defeating the Yankees in Game 7 during the 2001 postseason.

After beating the Philadelphia Phillies 4–2 in Game 7 of the 2023 NLCS at Citizens Bank Park in Philadelphia, the Diamondbacks returned to the World Series for the first time since 2001 – against the Texas Rangers on October 27, 2023. They lost the series 4–1, with the clinching Game 5 loss at home in Arizona on November 1, 2023.

== Logos and uniforms ==
=== 1998–2006 ===
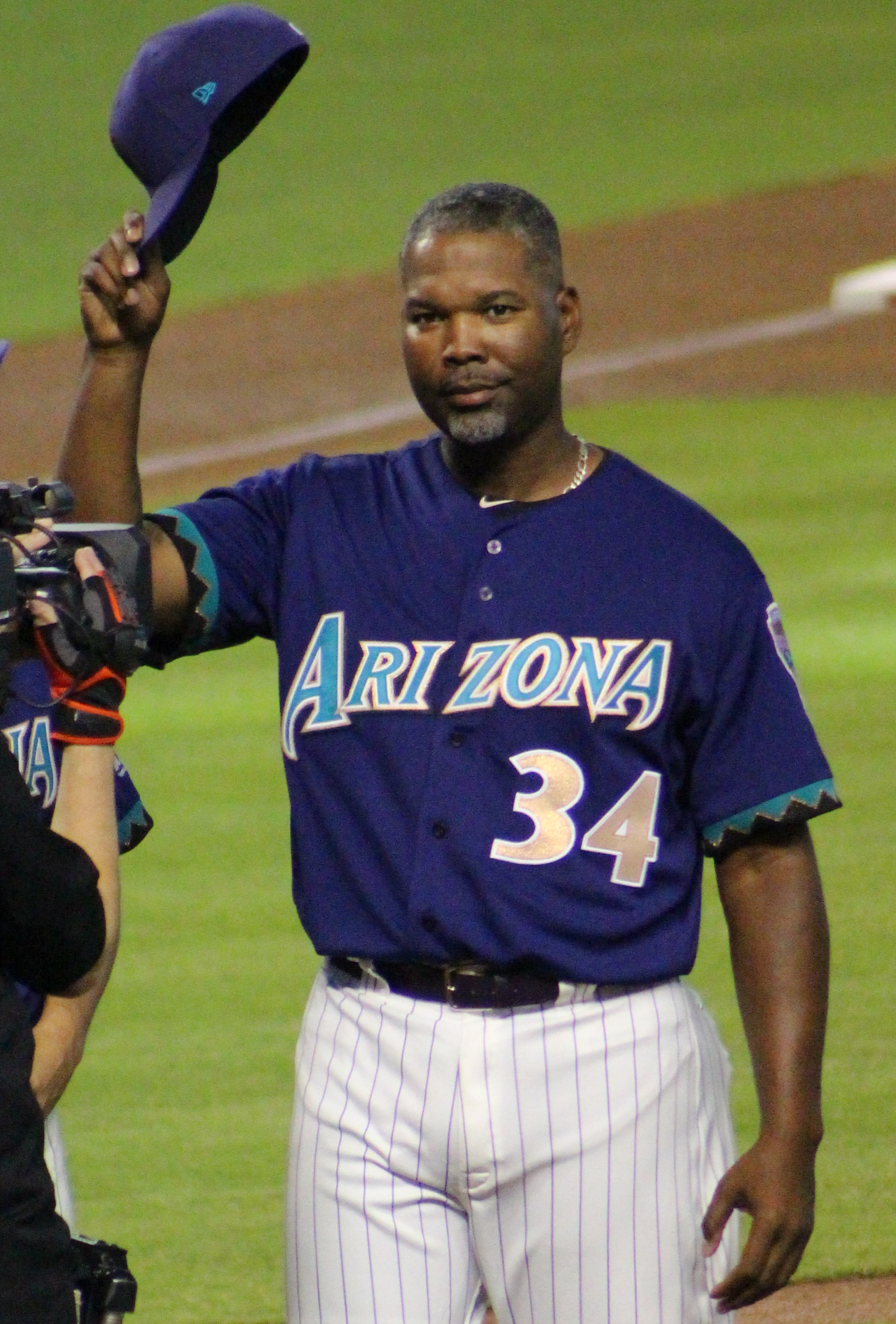
Uniform design from late 1990s through mid-2000s

The Diamondbacks' original colors were purple, black, teal, and copper. Their logo was an italicized block letter "A" with a diamond pattern, with the crossbar represented by a snake's tongue. This period saw the Diamondbacks wear several uniform combinations.

At home, the Diamondbacks wore cream uniforms with purple pinstripes. The primary sleeved uniform, worn from 1998 to 2000, featured the full team name ("Diamond" and "Backs" stacked together) in front and chest numbers. The alternate sleeveless version contained the "A" logo on the right chest and was paired with purple undershirts. Before the 2001 season, the sleeved uniform was changed to feature the "A" logo. In all three uniforms, player names were teal with purple trim, and numbers were purple with white with teal trim.

The Diamondbacks' primary road gray uniform also had purple pinstripes. The first version featured "Arizona" in purple with white and teal trim along with black drop shadows, with chest numbers added. Player names were in purple with white trim, and numbers were teal with white and purple trim. In 2001, the uniform became sleeveless with black undershirts, and the lettering scheme was changed to purple with white, copper, and black accents.

The alternate home purple uniform featured "Arizona" in teal with white and copper trim and black drop shadows. The letters were rendered in teal with copper and white trim, but were changed to copper with teal and white trim after only one season. This set was worn until 2002.

The alternate road black uniform featured the "A" logo on the right chest, while letters were purple with white trim and numbers were teal with white and purple trim. A zigzag pattern of teal, copper, and purple was featured on the sleeves. In 2001, the uniform was changed to feature "Arizona" in front. The letters became purple with white and copper trim.

The Diamondbacks initially wore four different cap versions. The primary home cap is all-purple, while the road cap is black with a teal brim. They also wore a cream cap with purple brim and a teal cap with purple brim. All designs featured the primary "A" logo. In 1999, the road cap became all-black and contained the alternate "D-snake" logo rendered in copper. Also, the teal and cream alternate caps were dropped.

The left sleeve of all four uniforms contained the snake logo with the full team name until the 2004 season, when it became exclusive to the road black uniform.

=== 2007–2015 ===
The franchise unveiled new uniforms and colors of Sedona red, Sonoran sand, and black on November 8, 2006. The red shade is named for the sandstone canyon at Red Rock State Park near Sedona, while the beige (sand) shade is named for the Sonoran Desert. A sleeve patch was added featuring a lowercase "d" and "b" configured to look like a snake's head. The team also kept the "D" logo, which was slightly altered and put on an all-red cap to be used as their game cap. They kept the "A" logo with the new colors applied to it, with a solid black cap used as the alternate cap. Arizona's updated color scheme bore a striking resemblance to the Houston Astros' color scheme (brick red, sand, and black) that the Astros used until 2012, as well as the NHL's Phoenix Coyotes, whose adoption of those colors predated the Diamondbacks by four years.

The white home uniform featured "D-Backs" in red with sand and black trim. The road gray uniform featured "Arizona" in red with sand and black trim. Player names were red with black trim while numbers were black with red trim.

The alternate red uniform contained "D-Backs" in sand with red and black trim, with player names in sand with black trim and numbers in black with sand trim.

There were two versions of the alternate black uniform. One design has the alternate "A" logo on the right chest, while the other has "Arizona" written in red with black and sand trim. The latter was introduced in 2013 as a tribute to the victims of the Yarnell Hill Fire. On both uniforms, player names were sand with red trim and numbers in red with sand trim.

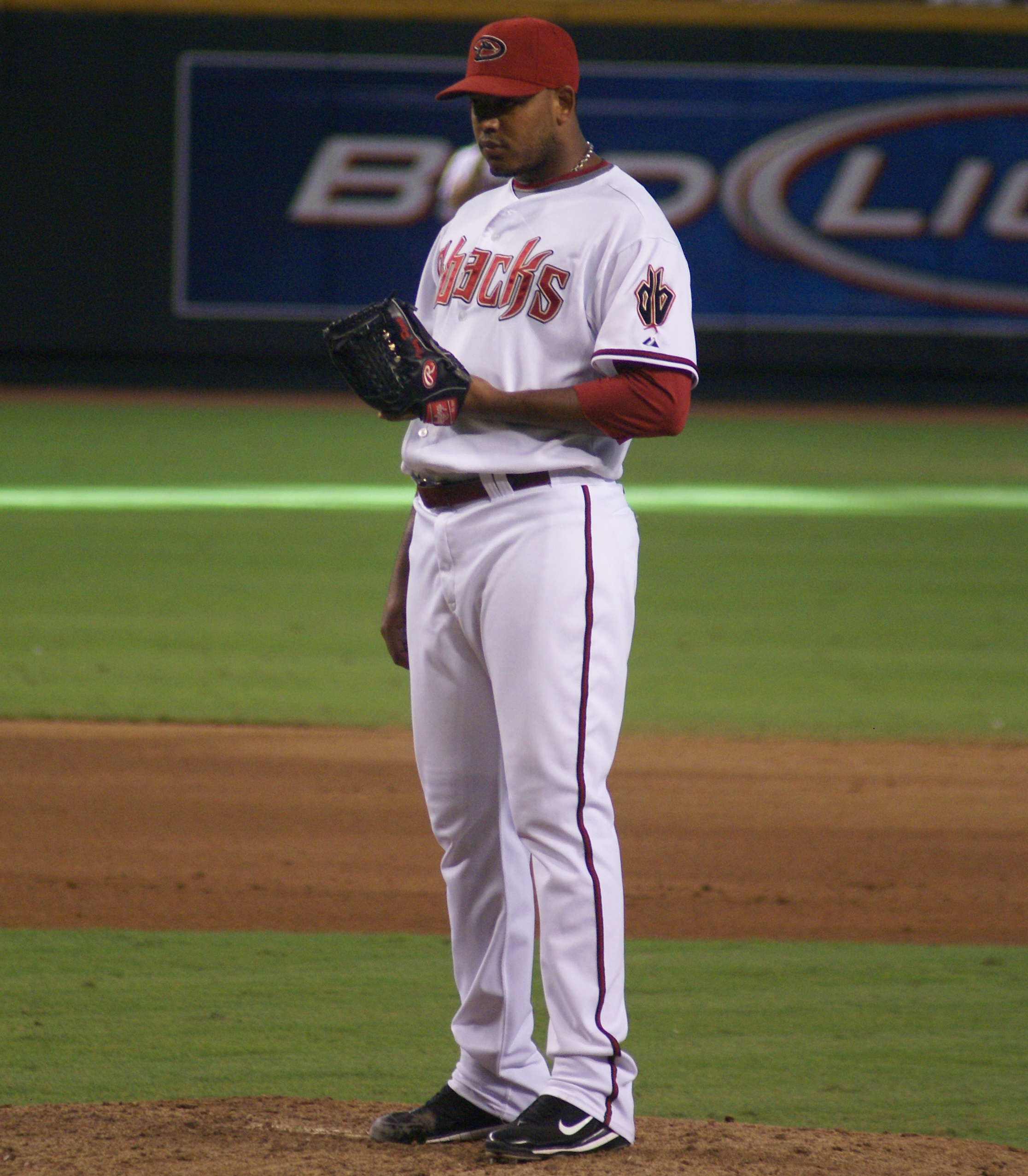
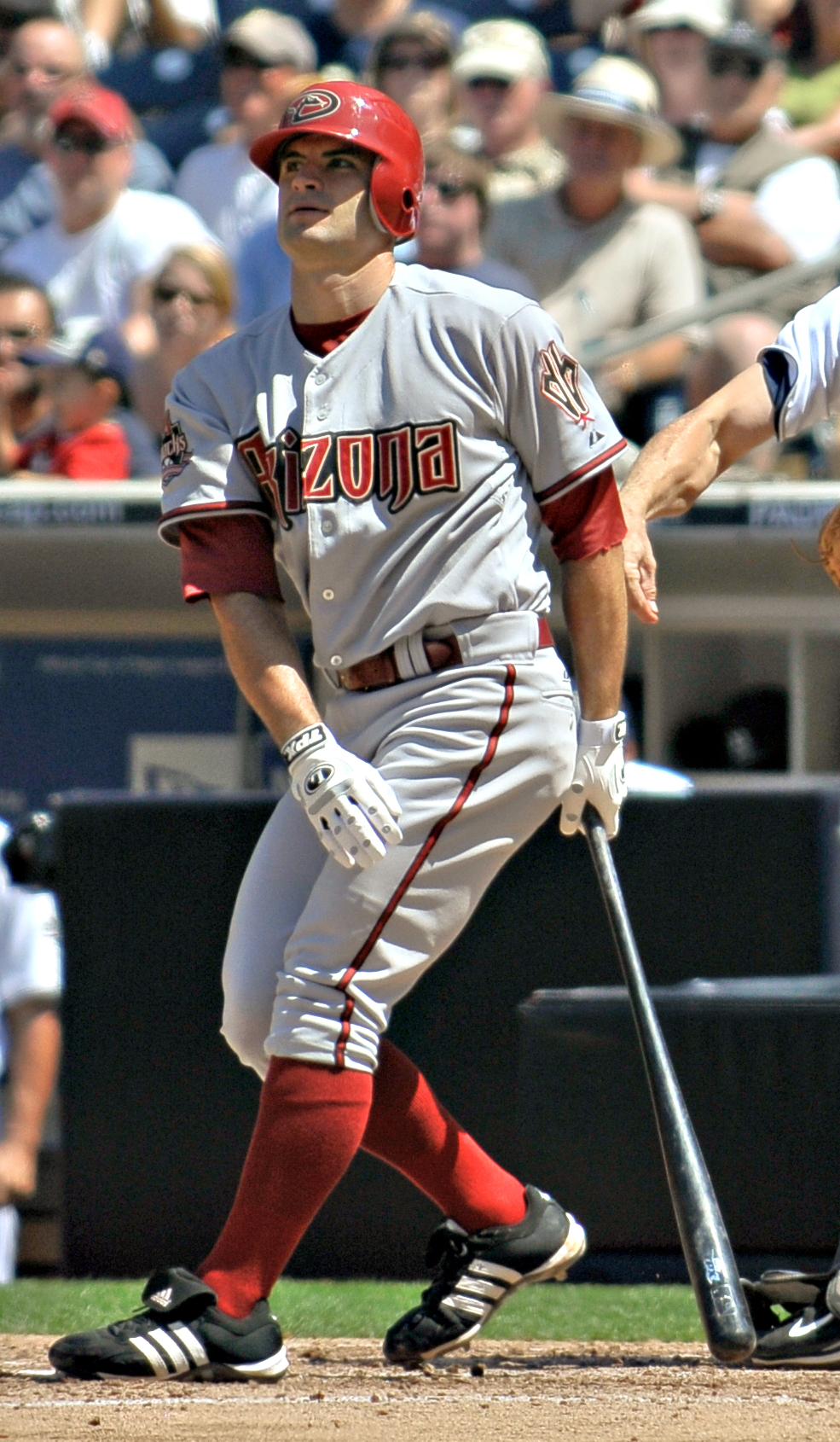
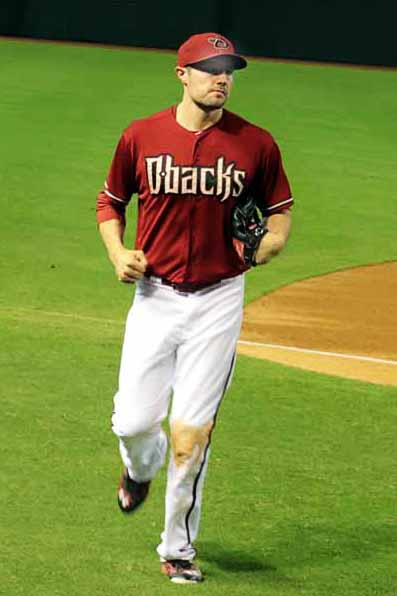
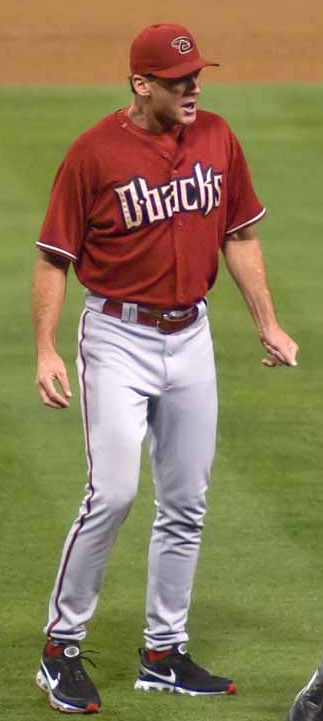
Tony Peña (left) in the 2007–2015 home uniform; Chris Burke (2nd from left) in the 2007–2015 road uniform; A. J. Pollock (2nd from right) in the 2007–2015 red alternate uniform with home pants; Bob Melvin (right) in the 2007–2015 red alternate uniform with road pants.

=== 2016–2023 ===
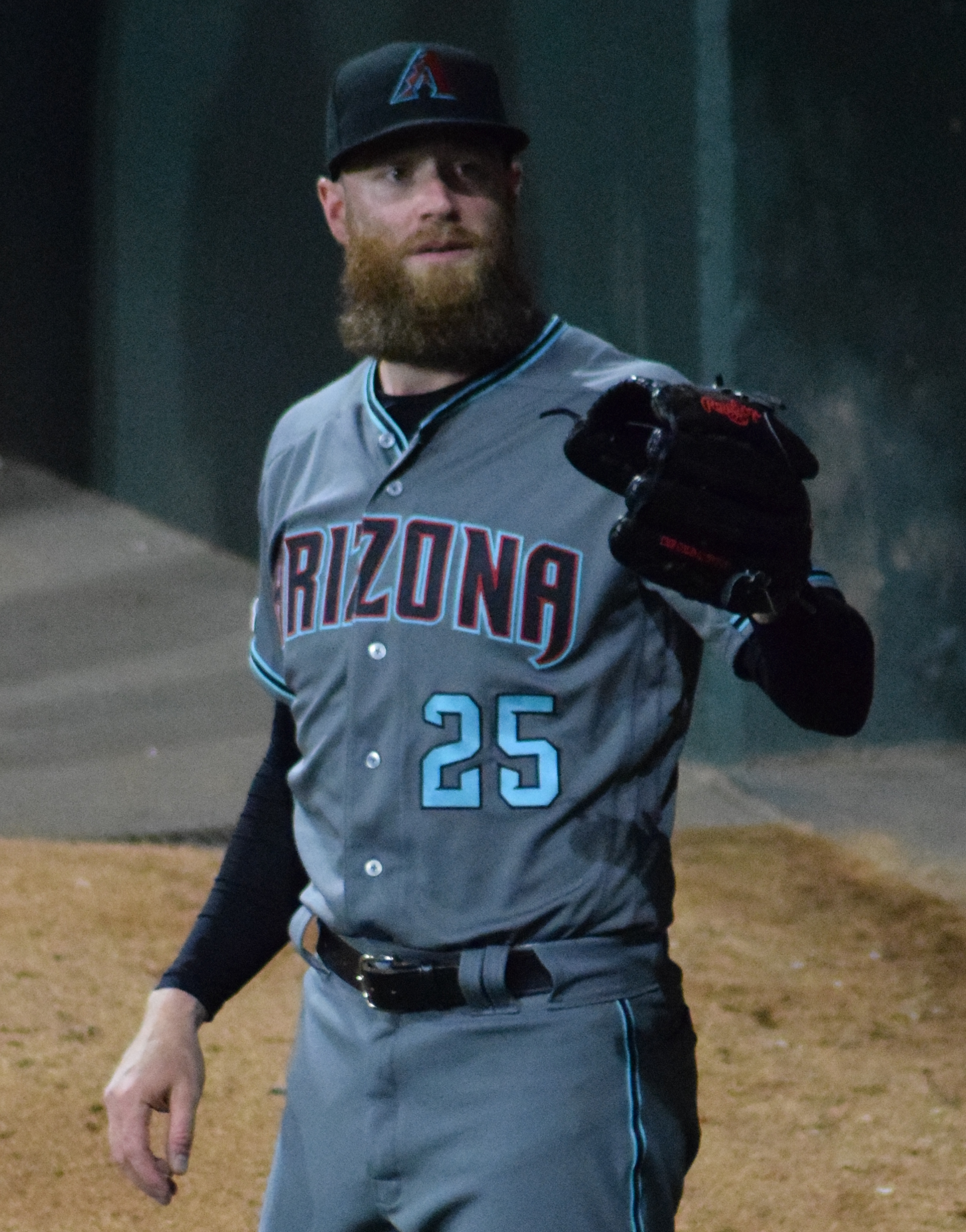
Alternate road uniform design from 2016 to 2019

Before the 2016 season, the Diamondbacks reincorporated teal into its color scheme while keeping Sedona Red, Sonoran Sand, and black. They also unveiled eight different uniform combinations, including two separate home white and away grey uniforms. One major difference between the two sets is that the non-teal uniforms feature a snakeskin pattern on the shoulders, while the teal-trimmed uniforms include a charcoal/grey snakeskin pattern on the back. Arizona also kept the throwback pinstriped sleeveless uniforms from their 2001 championship season for use during Thursday home games.

Starting with the 2020 season, the Diamondbacks made slight redesigns to their uniforms. The snakeskin patterns were removed while the teal-trimmed grey uniforms were retired. The team also reverted to a standard grey uniform after wearing a darker shade on the previous set. Two home white uniforms remain in use: the primary Sedona Red and the alternate teal. They would also wear two black uniforms: one with the primary "A" logo on the left chest and the other with "Los D-Backs" trimmed in teal. Three cap designs were also unveiled, all with a black base: the primary "A" cap, the teal-trimmed "snake" cap (paired exclusively on the teal alternates), and the sand-trimmed "snake" cap with red brim (paired exclusively on the Sedona Red alternates). The Nike swoosh logo is also placed on the right chest near the shoulder. In 2022, the Diamondbacks introduced a red "A" cap with black brim.

In 2021, the Diamondbacks were one of seven teams to wear Nike "City Connect" uniforms. The design is primarily sand and has "Serpientes" in black script lettering emblazoned in front. The first "S" in "Serpientes" was shaped to resemble a rattlesnake. The right sleeve has the flag of Arizona patch recolored to the Diamondbacks' red, sand, and black scheme, and the left sleeve has the "A" logo recolored to black and sand. Numerals are in red. The cap is primarily sand with black brim and has the "A" logo in black and sand; the regular batting helmet is used with the uniform. Initially, the Diamondbacks wore white pants with this uniform, but has since switched to sand pants.

Before the 2023 season, the Diamondbacks promoted the alternate white uniform with teal accents to its primary home uniform and retired the previous Sedona Red white uniform. This is due to a new Nike rule that limits teams to four regular uniforms plus the "City Connect" uniform.

=== 2024 to present ===
Coming off their second World Series appearance in 2023, the Diamondbacks unveiled refreshed uniform designs starting in 2024. Turquoise returned full-time as an accent color on all uniforms along with Sedona red and black, but sand was removed except on the "City Connect" uniform. The home uniform is now a cream base with black piping, featuring the "A" logo on the left chest. The road grey uniform with black piping featured "Arizona" in Sedona red with teal and black outlines. The alternate black uniform with teal piping shared the same features as the home uniform. The alternate Sedona red uniform incorporated the full "Diamondbacks" wordmark in black with teal and Sedona red outlines, along with teal numbers trimmed in black on the left chest. All uniforms featured the snake head alternate logo on either sleeve, with the sponsor logo (Avnet since 2023) on the other sleeve. The home cap is Sedona red with black brim and featured the "A" logo, and its all-black counterpart is worn with both the home and black alternate uniform. The road cap is black with Sedona red trim and featured the return of the "D-snake" logo and is worn with both the road and alternate Sedona red uniform. The all-Sedona red alternate cap shared the same features as the road cap and is worn with the Sedona red uniform.

In 2025, the Diamondbacks released a second "City Connect" uniform, updating the "Serpientes" wordmark but recolored to the original purple and teal colors. The uniforms take designs from all their different uniform combinations since they became a franchise in 1998. The jersey pays tribute to the original jersey with the Heritage Pinstripes worn from 1998−2006 as well as its “evolutionary jersey” from 2016−2019 by blending pinstripes with a snakeskin pattern. The jersey still features the word "Serpientes" with the "S" remaining the same from their previous version of their city connect, with the rest being a new design. The faux sleeves pay tribute to the 2001 World Series-winning team, which featured sleeveless jerseys that had a different colored sleeve. The sleeves also feature the Flag of Arizona on one sleeve, the state outline with a baseball silhouette and the year 1998, the founding year of the club, plus features a light color of teal in the shape of 48, as Arizona is the 48th state in the union. The trim on the sleeve is in teal and was used on the team uniform from 1998−2006, which is in the shape of a Diamondback Rattlesnake skin. The collar features the phrase "Arizona Born", pays tribute to the team's home state. The cap is in the original purple and has a teal brim that features the "S" Serpientes logo.

== Regular season home attendance ==
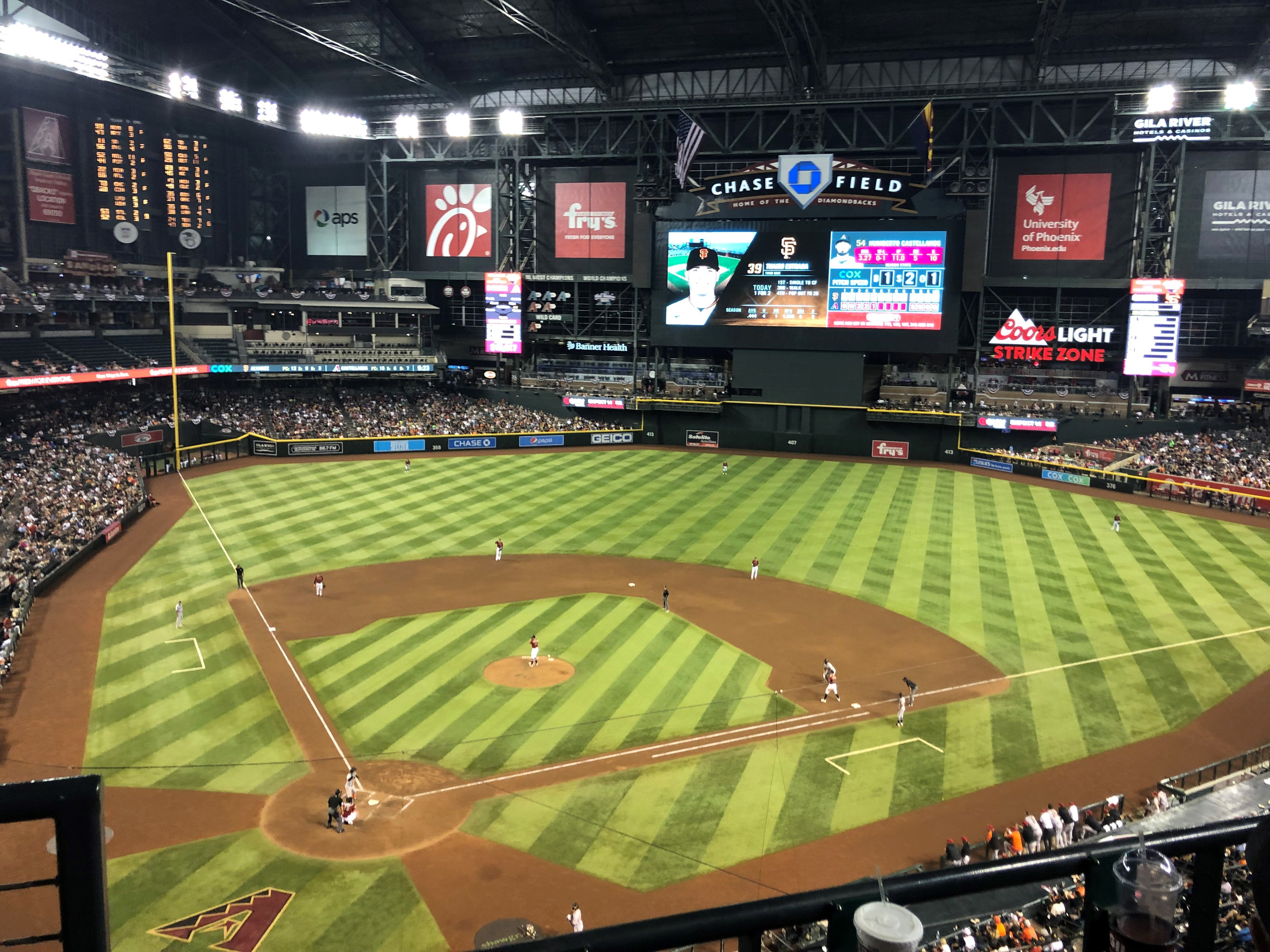
Chase Field in 2021

Home Attendance
Year	Total attendance	Game average	League rank
1998	3,610,290	44,571	2nd
1999	3,019,654	37,280	5th
2000	2,942,251	36,324	6th
2001	2,736,451	33,783	9th
2002	3,198,977	39,494	2nd
2003	2,805,542	34,636	5th
2004	2,519,560	31,106	8th
2005	2,059,424	25,425	12th
2006	2,091,685	25,823	14th
2007	2,325,249	28,707	12th
2008	2,509,924	30,987	11th
2009	2,128,765	26,281	11th
2010	2,056,697	25,391	13th
2011	2,105,432	25,993	12th
2012	2,177,617	26,884	13th
2013	2,134,895	26,357	14th
2014	2,073,730	25,602	14th
2015	2,080,145	25,681	12th
2016	2,036,216	25,138	11th
2017	2,134,375	26,350	11th
2018	2,242,695	27,688	9th
2019	2,135,510	26,364	12th
2020	0	0	N/A
2021	1,043,010	12,877	13th
2022	1,605,199	19,817	12th
2023	1,961,182	24,212	12th
2024	2,341,876	28,912	11th
2025	2,393,973	29,555	10th
2025	2,288,586	28,254	9th

== Radio and television ==
On July 18, 2023, a federal bankruptcy court granted Bally Sports' parent company Diamond Sports Group a motion to decline its contract with the Diamondbacks as part of its chapter 11 bankruptcy. As a result, Major League Baseball's local media division assumed production of the Diamondbacks' regional telecasts (maintaining staff such as commentators) and distributed them via local television providers and MLB.tv. As of 2024, these games are branded as DBacks.TV. Games air on the following cable providers and networks:

- Cox (Phoenix) (CH. 34)
- Cox (Tucson) (CH. 26)
- Cox (Las Vegas) (YurView Las Vegas)
- DirecTV/DirecTV Stream (CH. 686)
- Charter (CH. 304 or CH. 444)
- Xfinity/Comcast (CH. 1261)
- FuboTV

The primary television play-by-play voice for the team's first nine seasons of play was Thom Brennaman, who also broadcast baseball and college football games nationally for Fox Television. Brennaman was the TV announcer for the Chicago Cubs and Cincinnati Reds (along with his father Marty Brennaman) before being hired by Diamondbacks founder Jerry Colangelo in 1996, two years before the team would begin play.

In October 2006, Brennaman left the Diamondbacks to call games with his father for the Reds beginning in 2007, signing a four-year deal.

On November 1, 2006, the team announced that the TV voice of the Milwaukee Brewers since 2002, Daron Sutton, would be hired as the Diamondbacks primary TV play-by-play voice. Sutton signed a five-year contract with a team option for three more years. Sutton's signature chants included "let's get some runs" when the D-backs trail in late innings.

Former Diamondbacks and Cubs first baseman Mark Grace and knuckleballer Tom Candiotti were the Diamondbacks primary color analysts for the 2006 and 2007 seasons. Former Diamondbacks third baseman Matt Williams also did color commentary on occasion, as did Cardinals and NBC broadcast legend Joe Garagiola, a longtime Phoenix-area resident and father of Joe Garagiola Jr., the first GM of the Diamondbacks.

The Diamondbacks announced in July 2007 that for the 2008 season, all regionally broadcast Diamondbacks TV games would be shown exclusively on Fox Sports Arizona (subsequently Bally Sports Arizona) and a few could possibly be shown on the national MLB on Fox telecasts. Bally Sports Arizona is seen in 2.8 million households in Arizona and New Mexico. The previous flagship station since the inaugural 1998 season was KTVK (Channel 3), a popular over-the-air independent station (and former longtime ABC affiliate) in Phoenix.

From 2009 to 2012, Grace and Sutton were tagged as the main broadcasters of the Diamondbacks with pre-game and postgame shows on Fox Sports Arizona, being hosted by Joe Borowski.

On June 21, 2012, Sutton was suspended indefinitely amid rumors of insubordination. On August 24, the team announced that Grace had requested an indefinite leave of absence after being arrested for his second DUI in less than two years. Grace was later indicted on four DUI counts.) For the remainder of the 2012 season, Sutton was replaced by Greg Schulte (Jeff Munn replaced Schulte on the radio broadcast) and Grace was replaced by Luis Gonzalez. At the end of the 2012 season, the team announced that neither Sutton nor Grace would return for the 2013 season.

On October 18, 2012, the team announced that Bob Brenly would return as a broadcaster to replace Grace and that he would be joined by then-ESPN personality Steve Berthiaume.

The English language flagship radio station is KTAR. Greg Schulte was the regular radio play-by-play voice, a 25-year veteran of sports radio in the Phoenix market, also well known for his previous work on Phoenix Suns, Arizona Cardinals, and Arizona State University (ASU) broadcasts. It was announced in February 2023 that he would be retiring after the 2023 MLB season. He would call games with analyst Tom Candiotti.

Jeff Munn served as a backup radio play-by-play announcer until 2016; he served as the regular public address announcer at Chase Field in the early days of the franchise. He previously served as the public address announcer for the Suns in the 1990s at what became Footprint Center. He is also the play-by-play radio voice for ASU women's basketball. Mike Ferrin served in the same role for six years before parting ways with the team, and he was replaced by Chris Garagiola in December 2021.

On October 5, 2026 it was announced Berthiaume's contract was not being renewed after spending the previous 24 seasons as the lead play-by-play television announcer for the Diamondbacks. Chris Garagiola who spent the past three seasons as the team's primary radio play-by-play broadcaster, would be moving over from the radio team to be the lead play-by-play television for the 2027 season.

=== Spanish broadcasts ===
The flagship Spanish language radio station is KHOV-FM 105.1 with Oscar Soria, Rodrigo López, and Richard Saenz.

Games were televised in Spanish on KPHE-LP with Oscar Soria and Jerry Romo as the announcers, but this arrangement ended prior to the 2009 season due to the team switching fully to Fox Sports Arizona and the lack of carriage of KPHE-LP on the Cox cable system.

== Achievements ==
=== Baseball Hall of Famers ===
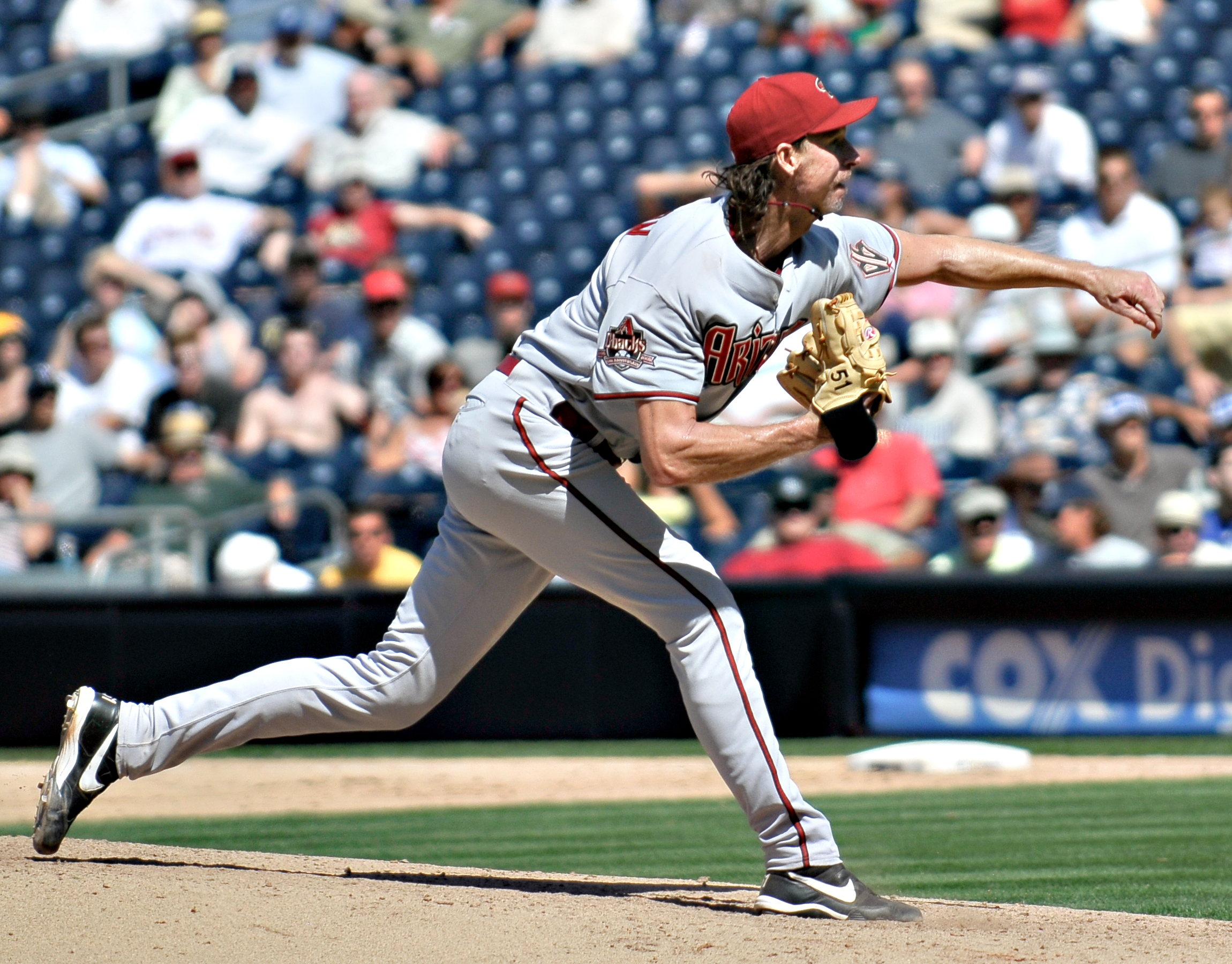
Randy Johnson (Hall of Famer) pitching for the Arizona Diamondbacks.

Arizona Diamondbacks Hall of Famers
Affiliation according to the National Baseball Hall of Fame and Museum
Arizona Diamondbacks

Roberto Alomar

**Randy Johnson**

- Players and managers listed in **bold** are depicted on their Hall of Fame plaques wearing a Diamondbacks cap insignia.
- * Arizona Diamondbacks listed as primary team according to the Hall of Fame

=== Ford C. Frick Award recipients ===
Arizona Diamondbacks Ford C. Frick Award recipients
Affiliation according to the National Baseball Hall of Fame and Museum

Joe Garagiola

- **Names in bold** received the award based primarily on their work as broadcasters for the Diamondbacks.

=== Arizona Sports Hall of Fame ===
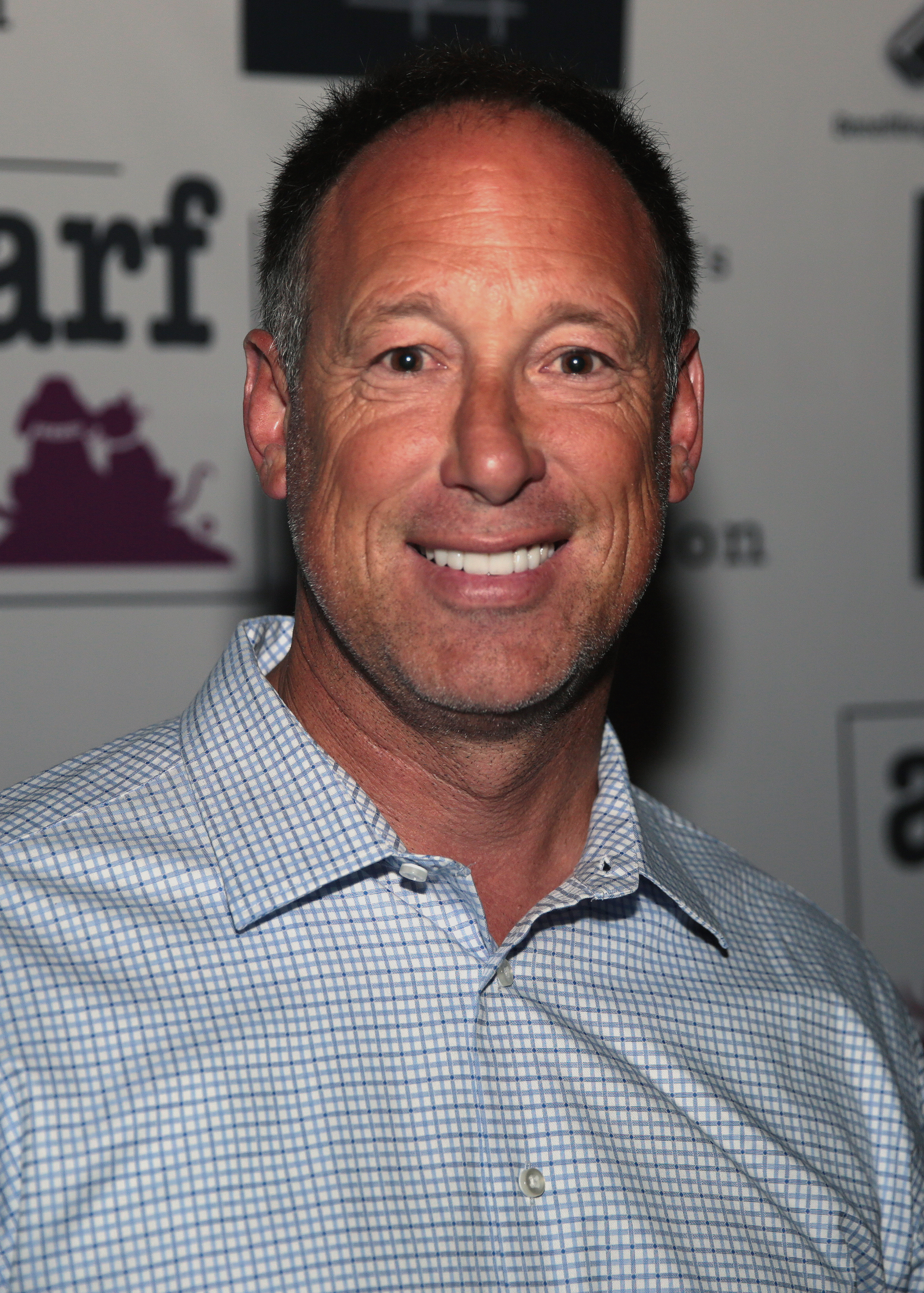
OF Luis Gonzalez (1999–2006)

**Diamondbacks in the Arizona Sports Hall of Fame**
No.	Name	Position	Tenure	Notes
—	Jerry Colangelo	Owner	1998–2004	
20	Luis Gonzalez	LF	1999–2006	
38	Curt Schilling	P	2000–2003	Grew up in Phoenix, attended Yavapai College
51	Randy Johnson	P	1999–2004; 2007–2008	
17	Mark Grace	1B	2001–2003	Diamondbacks Broadcaster from 2004 – 2012
—	Derrick Hall	Executive	2005–present	Attended Arizona State University
—	Roland Hemond	Executive	1996–2000; 2007–2017	

=== Arizona Diamondbacks Hall of Fame ===
Key
Year	Year inducted
**Bold**	Member of the Baseball Hall of Fame
†	Member of the Baseball Hall of Fame as a Diamondback
**Bold**	Recipient of the Hall of Fame's Ford C. Frick Award

**Arizona Diamondbacks Hall of Fame**
Year	No.	Name	Position(s)	Tenure
2024	20	Luis Gonzalez	LF	1999–2006
2024	51	**Randy Johnson**^{†}	P	1999–2004; 2007–2008

=== Award winners ===
==== Cy Young Award ====
- Randy Johnson – 1999, 2000, 2001, 2002
- Brandon Webb – 2006

==== NL Rookie of the Year Award ====
- Corbin Carroll – 2023

==== NL Manager of the Year Award ====
- Bob Melvin – 2007
- Kirk Gibson – 2011
- Torey Lovullo – 2017

==== Hank Aaron Award ====
- Paul Goldschmidt – 2013

==== Roberto Clemente Award ====
- Curt Schilling – 2001

=== All-time leaders ===
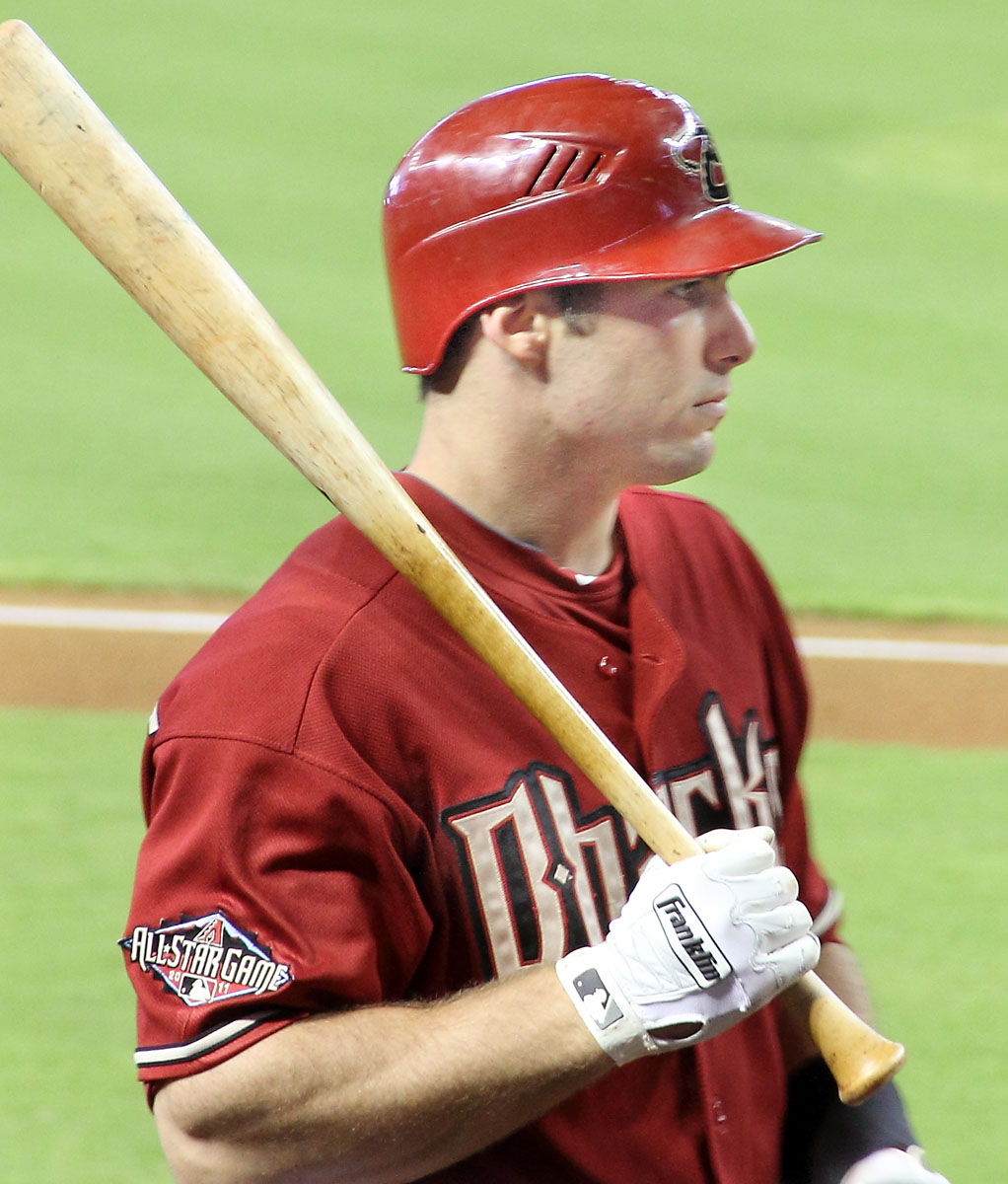
All-Star Paul Goldschmidt (2011–2018) had an on-base percentage of .398, during his tenure in Phoenix

==== Hitting ====
Games played
Luis Gonzalez (1999–2006) – 1,194
At bats
Luis Gonzalez – 4,488
Hits
Luis Gonzalez – 1,337
Batting average
Luis Gonzalez – .289
Runs
Luis Gonzalez – 780
Doubles
Luis Gonzalez – 310
Triples
Corbin Carroll – 55
Home runs
Luis Gonzalez – 224
Runs batted in
Luis Gonzalez – 774
On-base percentage
Paul Goldschmidt* – .398
Walks
Paul Goldschmidt* – 655
Strikeouts
Paul Goldschmidt* – 1,059
Slugging percentage
Paul Goldschmidt* – .532
Stolen bases
Tony Womack – 182

==== Pitching ====
ERA
Randy Johnson (1999–2004, 2007–08) – 2.83
Wins
Randy Johnson – 118
Losses
Randy Johnson/Brandon Webb (2003–10) – 62
Games
Andrew Chafin* – 380
Saves
José Valverde – 98
Innings
Randy Johnson – 1630.1
Starts
Randy Johnson – 232
Strikeouts
Randy Johnson – 2,077
Complete games
Randy Johnson – 38
Shutouts
Randy Johnson – 14
WHIP
Curt Schilling – 1.04

All stats are as of February 8, 2025, from the Arizona Diamondbacks website.

* signifies active Major League player

=== Championships ===
Preceded by New York Yankees	World Series Champions; 2001	Succeeded by Anaheim Angels
Preceded by New York Mets; Philadelphia Phillies	National League Champions; 2001; 2023	Succeeded by San Francisco Giants; Los Angeles Dodgers
Preceded by San Diego Padres; San Francisco Giants; San Diego Padres; San Francisco Giants	National League Western Division Champions; 1999; 2001, 2002; 2007; 2011	Succeeded by San Francisco Giants; San Francisco Giants; Los Angeles Dodgers; San Francisco Giants

=== Retired numbers ===
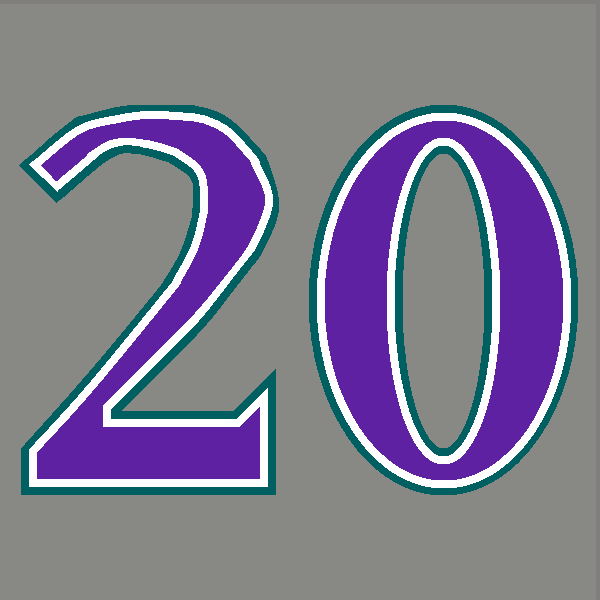
Luis
Gonzalez
LF
Retired August 7, 2010
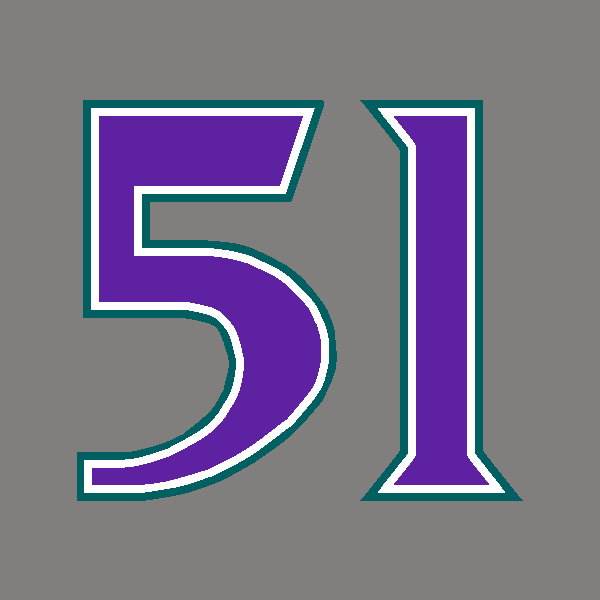
Randy
Johnson
P
Retired August 8, 2015
Jackie
Robinson
All MLB
Honored April 15, 1997
- No. 42 was retired throughout Major League Baseball in 1997 to honor Jackie Robinson.

== Roster ==
Arizona Diamondbacks 2027 spring training roster
40-man roster		Non-roster invitees	Coaches / other
Pitchers: 60 Mitch Bratt; 52 Juan Burgos; 39 Corbin Burnes; 53 José Cabrera; 68 Gerardo Carrillo; 45 Taylor Clarke; 58 Kohl Drake; 23 Zac Gallen; 55 Brandyn Garcia; 37 Kevin Ginkel; 29 Merrill Kelly; 43 Jonathan Loáisiga; 63 Justin Martínez; 62 Juan Morillo; 19 Ryne Nelson; 32 Brandon Pfaadt; 61 Dylan Ray; 57 Eduardo Rodríguez; 59 Dennis Santana; 34 Michael Soroka; 24 Kade Strowd; 48 Blake Walston	Catchers: 8 James McCann; 14 Gabriel Moreno; Infielders: 28 Nolan Arenado; 16 LuJames Groover; 4 Ketel Marte; 2 Geraldo Perdomo; 26 Pavin Smith; 13 Tim Tawa; 6 Ildemaro Vargas; Outfielders: 7 Corbin Carroll; 10 Jordan Lawlar; 21 Lars Nootbaar; 9 Tommy Troy; 15 Ryan Waldschmidt; Designated hitters: 25 Adrian Del Castillo; 11 José Fernández		Manager: 17 Torey Lovullo; Coaches: 82 Jeff Banister (bench); 76 Wellington Cepeda (bullpen); 73 Travis Denker (assistant hitting); 72 Owen Dew (assistant pitching); 75 Damion Easley (assistant hitting); 71 J. R. House (third base); 88 Shaun Larkin (infield); 74 Joe Mather (hitting); 36 Dave McKay (first base); 83 Jose Queliz (bullpen catcher); 84 Jhonatan Solano (bullpen catcher); Vacant (pitching); 60-day injured list: 31 Tyler Locklear; 64 Cristian Mena; 33 A. J. Puk; 27 Andrew Saalfrank; 81 Ryan Thompson; 39 active, 0 inactive, 0 non-roster invitees; 7-, 10-, or 15-day injured list; * Not on active roster; ^{†} Suspended list; Roster, coaches, and NRIs updated October 6, 2026; Transactions • Depth chart; → All MLB rosters

== Rivalries ==
=== Los Angeles Dodgers ===
The rivalry between the Diamondbacks and the Los Angeles Dodgers has been one of the fiercest divisional matchups for several years. Animosity between the two teams began to escalate during the 2010s in multiple incidents involving either team throwing pitches at one another or instigating into large-scale brawls between both benches. After eliminating the Diamondbacks and clinching the division on September 19, 2013, multiple Dodgers players celebrated the win by jumping into the pool at Chase Field. The two sides met during the 2017 National League Division Series as the Diamondbacks were swept 3–0 by the Dodgers en route to their appearance in the World Series that season. The Dodgers led the series 257–191 with a 3–0 lead in the postseason. After clinching the 2023 NL Wild Card berth and defeating the Milwaukee Brewers in the National League Wild Card Series, the Diamondbacks played the Dodgers again in the 2023 NLDS. There, the Diamondbacks emphatically swept the Dodgers to even the all-time postseason record between the two clubs at 3–3.

=== Colorado Rockies ===
The Diamondbacks developed an on-and-off rivalry with the Colorado Rockies, often attributed to both teams being the newest in the division. Colorado had joined the NL West in 1993, while the Diamondbacks are the newest team in the league, joining in 1998. The two teams have met twice in the postseason; notably during the 2007 National League Championship Series, which saw the Rockies enter the postseason as a wild card and go on to upset the division champion Diamondbacks in a sweep en route to the franchise's lone World Series appearance. The two teams met again in the 2017 National League Wild Card Game, which Arizona won.

== Minor league affiliations ==
The Arizona Diamondbacks farm system consists of seven minor league affiliates.

Class	Team	League	Location	Ballpark	Affiliated
Triple-A	Reno Aces	Pacific Coast League	Reno, Nevada	Greater Nevada Field	2009
Double-A	Amarillo Sod Poodles	Texas League	Amarillo, Texas	Hodgetown	2021
High-A	Hillsboro Hops	Northwest League	Hillsboro, Oregon	Hillsboro Hops Ballpark	2013
Single-A	Visalia Rawhide	California League	Visalia, California	Valley Strong Ballpark	2007
Rookie	ACL D-backs	Arizona Complex League	Scottsdale, Arizona	Salt River Fields at Talking Stick	2024
Rookie	DSL Arizona Black	Dominican Summer League	Boca Chica, Santo Domingo	Baseball City Complex	2016
Rookie	DSL Arizona Red	Dominican Summer League	Boca Chica, Santo Domingo	Baseball City Complex	2016

== See also ==
- List of Arizona Diamondbacks team records
- List of Arizona Diamondbacks broadcasters
- List of managers and ownership of the Arizona Diamondbacks

Awards and achievements
Preceded by New York Yankees; 1998–2000	World Series champions 2001	Succeeded by Anaheim Angels; 2002
Preceded by New York Mets; 2000	National League champions 2001	Succeeded by San Francisco Giants; 2002
Preceded by Philadelphia Phillies; 2022	National League champions 2023	Succeeded by Los Angeles Dodgers; 2024–2025
