= 2023 Arizona Diamondbacks season =

Major League Baseball team season

2023 Arizona Diamondbacks
- National League champions National League Wild Card winners
- League: National League
- Division: West
- Ballpark: Chase Field
- City: Phoenix, Arizona
- Record: 84–78 (.519)
- Divisional place: 2nd
- Owners: Ken Kendrick
- President: Derrick Hall
- President of baseball operations: Mike Hazen
- General managers: Mike Hazen
- Managers: Torey Lovullo
- Television: Bally Sports Arizona (until July 18); Games distributed to local cable providers like YurView Arizona (after July 18); Steve Berthiaume, Bob Brenly, Luis Gonzalez
- Radio: KMVP-FM (98.7); Greg Schulte, Tom Candiotti, Chris Garagiola, Oscar Soria, Rodrigo López
- Stats: ESPN.com; Baseball Reference

The 2023 Arizona Diamondbacks season was the franchise's 26th season in Major League Baseball and their 26th season at Chase Field in Phoenix, Arizona, as members of the National League West. They were managed by Torey Lovullo in his seventh season with the franchise. The Diamondbacks drew an average home attendance of 24,212 in 81 home games in the 2023 MLB season, the 20th highest in the league. The total attendance was 1,961,182.

On September 30, the Diamondbacks clinched a playoff spot and they faced the Milwaukee Brewers in the National League Wild Card Series. They upset the Brewers, sweeping them in two games to advance to the National League Division Series where they faced their division rival Los Angeles Dodgers. They swept the heavily favored Dodgers in three games to advance to the National League Championship Series for the first time since 2007. In the National League Championship Series, they eliminated the Philadelphia Phillies in seven games to advance to their first World Series in 22 years where they lost to the Texas Rangers in five games, earning their first World Series loss in franchise history.

The 2023 team was nicknamed "The Answerbacks" by fans and local media since they had a reputation for consistently pulling out come-from-behind wins. Diamondbacks broadcast announcer Steve Berthiaume was the first person to coin the term.

== Offseason ==
The Diamondbacks finished the 2022 season 74–88, an improvement on their 2021 record of 52–110. They finished 37 games out of 1st and missed the postseason for the fifth consecutive season.

=== Notable roster changes ===
- November 8: Claimed Cole Sulser off waiver from the Miami Marlins.
- November 17: Traded Cooper Hummel to the Seattle Mariners for Kyle Lewis.
- December 2: Signed free agent Miguel Castro.
- December 15: Signed free agent Scott McGough.
- December 23: Traded Daulton Varsho to the Toronto Blue Jays for Lourdes Gurriel Jr. and Gabriel Moreno.
- January 5: Signed free agent Evan Longoria.
- January 11: Re-signed free agent Zach Davies.
- February 15: Signed free agent Andrew Chafin.

== Spring training ==
The Diamondbacks posted a 16-14-2 record in spring training.

=== World Baseball Classic ===
- RHP Endrys Briceno (Venezuela)
- OF Dominic Fletcher (Italy)
- RHP Gunnar Groen (Great Britain)
- RHP Merrill Kelly (United States)
- INF/OF Ketel Marte (Dominican Republic)
- RHP Eric Mendez (Netherlands)
- C Dominic Miroglio (Italy)
- INF Emmanuel Rivera (Puerto Rico)
- LHP Will Sherriff (Australia)
- RHP Jacob Steinmetz (Israel)
- RHP Mitchell Stumpo (Italy)
- OF Alek Thomas (Mexico)
- RHP Boris Večerka (Czechia)

== Season standings ==
=== National League West ===
NL West
Team	W	L	Pct.	GB	Home	Road
Los Angeles Dodgers	100	62	.617	—	53‍–‍28	47‍–‍34
Arizona Diamondbacks	84	78	.519	16	43‍–‍38	41‍–‍40
San Diego Padres	82	80	.506	18	44‍–‍37	38‍–‍43
San Francisco Giants	79	83	.488	21	45‍–‍36	34‍–‍47
Colorado Rockies	59	103	.364	41	37‍–‍44	22‍–‍59

=== National League Wild Card ===
Division leaders
Team	W	L	Pct.
Atlanta Braves	104	58	.642
Los Angeles Dodgers	100	62	.617
Milwaukee Brewers	92	70	.568

Wild Card teams (Top 3 teams qualify for postseason)
Team	W	L	Pct.	GB
Philadelphia Phillies	90	72	.556	+6
Miami Marlins	84	78	.519	—
Arizona Diamondbacks	84	78	.519	—
Chicago Cubs	83	79	.512	1
San Diego Padres	82	80	.506	2
Cincinnati Reds	82	80	.506	2
San Francisco Giants	79	83	.488	5
Pittsburgh Pirates	76	86	.469	8
New York Mets	75	87	.463	9
St. Louis Cardinals	71	91	.438	13
Washington Nationals	71	91	.438	13
Colorado Rockies	59	103	.364	25

=== Record vs. opponents ===
vs. NL Records

2023 National League record Source: MLB Standings Grid – 2023
Team	AZ	ATL	CHC	CIN	COL	LAD	MIA	MIL	NYM	PHI	PIT	SD	SF	STL	WSH	AL
Arizona	—	3–3	6–1	3–4	10–3	5–8	2–4	4–2	1–6	3–4	4–2	7–6	7–6	3–3	5–1	21–25
Atlanta	3–3	—	4–2	5–1	7–0	4–3	9–4	5–1	10–3	8–5	4–3	3–4	4–2	4–2	8–5	26–20
Chicago	1–6	2–4	—	6–7	4–2	3–4	2–4	6–7	3–3	1–5	10–3	4–3	5–1	8–5	3–4	25–21
Cincinnati	4–3	1–5	7–6	—	4–2	4–2	3–3	3–10	4–2	3–4	5–8	3–3	3–4	6–7	4–3	28–18
Colorado	3–10	0–7	2–4	2–4	—	3–10	5–2	4–2	4–2	2–5	2–4	4–9	4–9	3–3	3–4	18–28
Los Angeles	8–5	3–4	4–3	2–4	10–3	—	3–3	5–1	3–3	4–2	4–3	9–4	7–6	4–3	4–2	30–16
Miami	4–2	4–9	4–2	3–3	2–5	3–3	—	3–4	4–8	7–6	5–2	2–4	3–3	3–4	11–2	26–20
Milwaukee	2–4	1–5	7–6	10–3	2–4	1–5	4–3	—	6–1	4–2	8–5	6–1	2–5	8–5	3–3	28–18
New York	6–1	3–10	3–3	2–4	2–4	3–3	8–4	1–6	—	6–7	3–3	3–3	4–3	4–3	7–6	19–27
Philadelphia	4–3	5–8	5–1	4–3	5–2	2–4	6–7	2–4	7–6	—	3–3	5–2	2–4	5–1	7–6	28–18
Pittsburgh	2–4	3–4	3–10	8–5	4–2	3–4	2–5	5–8	3–3	3–3	—	5–1	2–4	9–4	5–2	19–27
San Diego	6–7	4–3	3–4	3–3	9–4	4–9	4–2	1–6	3–3	2–5	1–5	—	8–5	3–3	3–3	28–18
San Francisco	6–7	2–4	1–5	4–3	9–4	6–7	3–3	5–2	3–4	4–2	4–2	5–8	—	6–1	1–5	20–26
St. Louis	3–3	2–4	5–8	7–6	3–3	3–4	4–3	5–8	3–4	1–5	4–9	3–3	1–6	—	4–2	23–23
Washington	1–5	5–8	4–3	3–4	4–3	2–4	2–11	3–3	6–7	6–7	2–5	3–3	5–1	2–4	—	23–23

Updated with the results of all games through October 1, 2023.
vs. AL Records

2023 National League record vs. American League Source: MLB Standings
Team	BAL	BOS	CWS	CLE	DET	HOU	KC	LAA	MIN	NYY	OAK	SEA	TB	TEX	TOR
Arizona	1–2	1–2	2–1	2–1	3–0	0–3	2–1	2–1	0–3	1–2	2–1	1–2	1–2	3–1	0–3
Atlanta	2–1	1–3	1–2	2–1	2–1	0–3	3–0	2–1	3–0	3–0	1–2	2–1	2–1	2–1	0–3
Chicago	2–1	1–2	3–1	1–2	2–1	0–3	2–1	0–3	1–2	2–1	3–0	2–1	2–1	2–1	2–1
Cincinnati	2–1	2–1	1–2	2–2	2–1	3–0	3–0	3–0	1–2	0–3	2–1	2–1	1–2	3–0	1–2
Colorado	1–2	2–1	2–1	2–1	1–2	1–3	2–1	2–1	1–2	2–1	1–2	0–3	0–3	0–3	1–2
Los Angeles	2–1	2–1	2–1	2–1	2–1	2–1	1–2	4–0	2–1	1–2	3–0	3–0	1–2	2–1	1–2
Miami	0–3	3–0	2–1	2–1	2–1	1–2	3–0	3–0	2–1	2–1	3–0	1–2	1–3	0–3	1–2
Milwaukee	2–1	1–2	3–0	2–1	1–2	2–1	3–0	2–1	2–2	2–1	0–3	3–0	1–2	3–0	1–2
New York	0–3	1–2	2–1	3–0	0–3	1–2	0–3	1–2	1–2	2–2	3–0	2–1	2–1	1–2	0–3
Philadelphia	2–1	1–2	2–1	1–2	3–0	2–1	2–1	2–1	1–2	1–2	3–0	2–1	3–0	0–3	3–1
Pittsburgh	1–2	3–0	2–1	1–2	2–2	1–2	3–0	1–2	1–2	1–2	1–2	1–2	0–3	1–2	0–3
San Diego	2–1	1–2	3–0	2–1	2–1	1–2	1–2	3–0	1–2	1–2	3–0	1–3	2–1	3–0	2–1
San Francisco	1–2	2–1	2–1	2–1	0–3	2–1	1–2	1–2	2–1	1–2	2–2	1–2	1–2	1–2	1–2
St. Louis	2–1	3–0	2–1	1–2	1–2	1–2	2–2	0–3	1–2	2–1	2–1	1–2	2–1	1–2	2–1
Washington	0–4	2–1	2–1	1–2	2–1	1–2	2–1	1–2	2–1	2–1	3–0	2–1	0–3	2–1	1–2

Updated with the results of all games through October 1, 2023.

== Regular season ==
=== Game log ===
Legend
	Diamondbacks win
	Diamondbacks loss
	Postponement
	Clinched playoff spot
**Bold**	Diamondbacks team member

2023 Game Log: 84–78 (Home: 43–38; Away: 41–40)
March/April: 16–13 (Home: 8–6; Away: 8–7)

#	Date	Opponent	Score	Win	Loss	Save	Attendance	Record	Streak
1	March 30	@ Dodgers	2–8	Urías (1–0)	**Gallen** (0–1)	—	52,075	0–1	L1
2	March 31	@ Dodgers	2–1	**Jameson** (1–0)	Vesia (0–1)	**Chafin** (1)	45,389	1–1	W1
3	April 1	@ Dodgers	1–10	Kershaw (1–0)	**Bumgarner** (0–1)	Jackson (1)	48,886	1–2	L1
4	April 2	@ Dodgers	2–1	**Chafin** (1–0)	Graterol (0–1)	**McGough** (1)	46,549	2–2	W1
5	April 3	@ Padres	4–5	Hill (1–0)	**McGough** (0–1)	—	37,602	2–3	L1
6	April 4	@ Padres	8–6	**Ginkel** (1–0)	García (0–1)	**Jameson** (1)	34,542	3–3	W1
7	April 6	Dodgers	2–5	May (1–0)	**Kelly** (0–1)	Phillips (2)	48,034	3–4	L1
8	April 7	Dodgers	6–3	**Jameson** (2–0)	Kershaw (1–1)	—	30,249	4–4	W1
9	April 8	Dodgers	12–8	**K. Nelson** (1–0)	Syndergaard (0–1)	—	26,881	5–4	W2
10	April 9	Dodgers	11–6	**R. Nelson** (1–0)	Grove (0–1)	—	18,543	6–4	W3
11	April 10	Brewers	3–0	**Gallen** (1–1)	Miley (1–1)	**Chafin** (2)	12,681	7–4	W4
12	April 11	Brewers	1–7	Burnes (1–1)	**Kelly** (0–2)	—	17,069	7–5	L1
13	April 12	Brewers	7–3	**K. Nelson** (2–0)	Junk (0–1)	—	13,136	8–5	W1
14	April 14	@ Marlins	1–5	Rogers (1–2)	**Bumgarner** (0–2)	—	10,961	8–6	L1
15	April 15	@ Marlins	2–3	Nardi (1–1)	**McGough** (0–2)	Scott (1)	11,038	8–7	L2
16	April 16	@ Marlins	5–0	**Gallen** (2–1)	Alcántara (1–2)	—	15,314	9–7	W1
17	April 17	@ Cardinals	6–3	**Kelly** (1–2)	Flaherty (1–2)	**Chafin** (3)	36,405	10–7	W2
18	April 18	@ Cardinals	8–7	**K. Nelson** (3–0)	Montgomery (2–2)	**Castro** (1)	36,028	11–7	W3
19	April 19	@ Cardinals	5–14	Woodford (1–2)	**Bumgarner** (0–3)	—	39,068	11–8	L1
20	April 20	Padres	5–7	Honeywell Jr. (2–0)	**K. Nelson** (3–1)	Hader (6)	16,734	11–9	L2
21	April 21	Padres	9–0	**Gallen** (3–1)	Lugo (2–1)	—	21,308	12–9	W1
22	April 22	Padres	3–5	Musgrove (1–0)	**Kelly** (1–3)	Hader (7)	28,419	12–10	L1
23	April 23	Padres	5–7	Darvish (1–2)	**Jameson** (2–1)	Hader (8)	23,655	12–11	L2
24	April 24	Royals	5–4	**Chafin** (2–0)	Chapman (0–1)	—	9,815	13–11	W1
25	April 25	Royals	4–5	Singer (2–2)	**R. Nelson** (1–1)	Barlow (3)	13,835	13–12	L1
26	April 26	Royals	2–0	**Gallen** (4–1)	Yarbrough (0–3)	**Chafin** (4)	14,343	14–12	W1
27	April 28	@ Rockies	9–1	**Kelly** (2–3)	Freeland (2–3)	—	24,197	15–12	W2
28	April 29	@ Rockies	11–4	**Henry** (1–0)	Davis (0–1)	—	34,399	16–12	W3
29	April 30	@ Rockies	4–12	Gomber (2–4)	**R. Nelson** (1–2)	—	31,900	16–13	L1

May: 17–10 (Home: 10–6; Away: 7–4)

#	Date	Opponent	Score	Win	Loss	Save	Attendance	Record	Streak
30	May 2	@ Rangers	4–6	Burke (2–0)	**McGough** (0–3)	Smith (4)	23,086	16–14	L2
31	May 3	@ Rangers	12–7	**Mantiply** (1–0)	Sborz (0–2)	—	21,427	17–14	W1
32	May 5	Nationals	3–1	**Kelly** (3–3)	Gray (2–5)	**Chafin** (5)	16,384	18–14	W2
33	May 6	Nationals	8–7	**Castro** (1–0)	Finnegan (1–2)	—	27,345	19–14	W3
34	May 7	Nationals	8–9	Ramírez (2–1)	**Castro** (1–1)	Harvey (1)	17,174	19–15	L1
35	May 8	Marlins	5–2	**Gallen** (5–1)	Garrett (1–2)	—	9,071	20–15	W1
36	May 9	Marlins	2–6	Luzardo (3–2)	**Pfaadt** (0–1)	—	13,608	20–16	L1
37	May 10	Marlins	4–5	Floro (2–1)	**Chafin** (2–1)	Puk (6)	10,482	20–17	L2
38	May 11	Giants	2–6	Cobb (3–1)	**Henry** (1–1)	—	15,582	20–18	L3
39	May 12	Giants	7–5	**Misiewicz** (1–0)	Junis (2–2)	**Castro** (2)	19,266	21–18	W1
40	May 13	Giants	7–2	**Gallen** (6–1)	DeSclafani (3–3)	—	25,147	22–18	W2
41	May 14	Giants	2–1	**Castro** (2–1)	Rogers (0–3)	—	26,267	23–18	W3
42	May 15	@ Athletics	5–2	**Kelly** (4–3)	Rucinski (0–4)	**Chafin** (6)	2,064	24–18	W4
43	May 16	@ Athletics	8–9 (12)	Pruitt (1–1)	**McGough** (0–4)	—	3,261	24–19	L1
44	May 17	@ Athletics	5–3	**Ruiz** (1–0)	Fujinami (1–5)	**Castro** (3)	4,159	25–19	W1
45	May 19	@ Pirates	3–13	Oviedo (3–3)	**Gallen** (6–2)	—	25,903	25–20	L1
46	May 20	@ Pirates	4–3	**K. Nelson** (4–1)	Stephenson (0–2)	**Castro** (4)	22,876	26–20	W1
47	May 21	@ Pirates	8–3	**Kelly** (5–3)	Moreta (1–1)	—	21,418	27–20	W2
48	May 22	@ Phillies	6–3	**Henry** (2–1)	Wheeler (3–4)	**Chafin** (7)	34,040	28–20	W3
49	May 23	@ Phillies	4–3	**Castro** (3–1)	Domínguez (1–2)	—	33,420	29–20	W4
50	May 24	@ Phillies	5–6 (10)	Kimbrel (3–1)	**Ruiz** (1–1)	—	41,544	29–21	L1
51	May 26	Red Sox	2–7	Sale (5–2)	**Pfaadt** (0–2)	—	25,467	29–22	L2
52	May 27	Red Sox	1–2	Whitlock (2–2)	**Davies** (0–1)	Jansen (11)	29,142	29–23	L3
53	May 28	Red Sox	4–2	**Kelly** (6–3)	Houck (3–4)	**Castro** (5)	26,051	30–23	W1
54	May 29	Rockies	7–5	**R. Nelson** (2–2)	Kauffmann (0–3)	**Chafin** (8)	15,304	31–23	W2
55	May 30	Rockies	5–1	**Gallen** (7–2)	Freeland (4–6)	—	11,146	32–23	W3
56	May 31	Rockies	6–0	**Henry** (3–1)	Lamet (1–2)	—	11,844	33–23	W4

June: 16–11 (Home: 6–8; Away: 10–3)

#	Date	Opponent	Score	Win	Loss	Save	Attendance	Record	Streak
57	June 1	Rockies	5–4	**Ginkel** (2–0)	Johnson (0–2)	—	16,492	34–23	W5
58	June 2	Braves	3–2	**Kelly** (7–3)	Morton (5–6)	**Castro** (6)	27,469	35–23	W6
59	June 3	Braves	2–5	Strider (6–2)	**R. Nelson** (2–3)	Iglesias (6)	36,529	35–24	L1
60	June 4	Braves	5–8	Minter (3–5)	**Castro** (3–2)	Iglesias (7)	32,401	35–25	L2
61	June 6	@ Nationals	10–5	**Ruiz** (2–1)	Ramírez (2–3)	—	24,743	36–25	W1
62	June 7	@ Nationals	6–2	**Davies** (1–1)	Corbin (4–6)	—	18,180	37–25	W2
—	June 8	@ Nationals	Postponed (Air quality/Smoke); Makeup: June 22						
63	June 9	@ Tigers	11–6	**Kelly** (8–3)	Lorenzen (2–3)	—	19,664	38–25	W3
64	June 10	@ Tigers	5–0	**R. Nelson** (3–3)	Boyd (3–5)	—	31,607	39–25	W4
65	June 11	@ Tigers	7–5	**Ginkel** (3–0)	Foley (2–2)	**McGough** (2)	17,956	40–25	W5
66	June 12	Phillies	9–8	**Jameson** (3–1)	Covey (1–2)	**Castro** (7)	18,432	41–25	W6
67	June 13	Phillies	3–15	Wheeler (5–4)	**Davies** (1–2)	Ortiz (1)	20,186	41–26	L1
68	June 14	Phillies	3–4 (10)	Kimbrel (5–1)	**McGough** (0–5)	Alvarado (6)	20,286	41–27	L2
69	June 15	Phillies	4–5	Nola (6–5)	**R. Nelson** (3–4)	Kimbrel (10)	23,032	41–28	L3
70	June 16	Guardians	5–1	**Gallen** (8–2)	Toussaint (0–1)	—	27,203	42–28	W1
71	June 17	Guardians	6–3	**Castro** (4–2)	Bieber (5–4)	**McGough** (3)	25,471	43–28	W2
72	June 18	Guardians	3–12	Bibee (3–2)	**Davies** (1–3)	—	42,031	43–29	L1
73	June 19	@ Brewers	9–1	**Kelly** (9–3)	Burnes (5–5)	—	24,257	44–29	W1
74	June 20	@ Brewers	5–7	Wilson (2–0)	**Adams** (0–1)	Williams (13)	27,048	44–30	L1
75	June 21	@ Brewers	5–1	**Gallen** (9–2)	Peguero (1–1)	**McGough** (4)	31,397	45–30	W1
76	June 22	@ Nationals	5–3	**Henry** (4–1)	Irvin (1–4)	**McGough** (5)	13,251	46–30	W2
77	June 23	@ Giants	5–8	Webb (7–6)	**Davies** (1–4)	Doval (21)	31,992	46–31	L1
78	June 24	@ Giants	6–7	Rogers (4–2)	**Kelly** (9–4)	Doval (22)	34,343	46–32	L2
79	June 25	@ Giants	5–2	**R. Nelson** (4–4)	DeSclafani (4–7)	**McGough** (6)	35,766	47–32	W1
80	June 27	Rays	8–4	**Gallen** (10–2)	Bradley (5–4)	—	23,351	48–32	W2
81	June 28	Rays	2–3	Poche (6–2)	**McGough** (0–6)	Fairbanks (9)	20,858	48–33	L1
82	June 29	Rays	1–6	Chirinos (4–3)	**Pfaadt** (0–3)	—	22,127	48–34	L2
83	June 30	@ Angels	6–2	**Henry** (5–1)	Canning (6–3)	—	34,957	49–34	W1

July: 8–16 (Home: 4–8; Away: 4–8)

#	Date	Opponent	Score	Win	Loss	Save	Attendance	Record	Streak
84	July 1	@ Angels	3–1	**R. Nelson** (5–4)	Bachman (1–2)	**McGough** (7)	44,472	50–34	W2
85	July 2	@ Angels	2–5	Detmers (2–5)	**Gallen** (10–3)	Estévez (21)	29,167	50–35	L1
86	July 4	Mets	5–8	Scherzer (8–2)	**Castro** (4–3)	Robertson (12)	41,670	50–36	L2
87	July 5	Mets	1–2	Senga (7–5)	**Chafin** (2–2)	Robertson (13)	18,152	50–37	L3
88	July 6	Mets	0–9	Carrasco (3–3)	**R. Nelson** (5–5)	—	18,514	50–38	L4
89	July 7	Pirates	7–3	**Gallen** (11–3)	Hill (7–9)	—	26,837	51–38	W1
90	July 8	Pirates	3–2 (10)	**McGough** (1–6)	Bednar (3–1)	—	31,801	52–38	W2
91	July 9	Pirates	2–4	Bido (1–1)	**Davies** (1–5)	Bednar (17)	30,021	52–39	L1
–	July 11	**93rd All-Star Game in Seattle, WA**							
92	July 14	@ Blue Jays	2–7	Richards (1–1)	**K. Nelson** (4–2)	—	38,617	52–40	L2
93	July 15	@ Blue Jays	2–5	Bassitt (9–5)	**Gallen** (11–4)	García (2)	42,328	52–41	L3
94	July 16	@ Blue Jays	5–7	Jackson (2–0)	**Henry** (5–2)	Swanson (2)	41,794	52–42	L4
95	July 18	@ Braves	16–13	**Castro** (5–3)	Iglesias (3–4)	**Ginkel** (1)	41,100	53–42	W1
96	July 19	@ Braves	5–3	**R. Nelson** (6–5)	Morton (10–7)	**Ginkel** (2)	41,992	54–42	W2
97	July 20	@ Braves	5–7	Yates (4–0)	**Castro** (5–4)	Iglesias (17)	38,791	54–43	L1
98	July 21	@ Reds	6–9	Young (4–0)	**Henry** (5–3)	Díaz (28)	31,824	54–44	L2
99	July 22	@ Reds	2–4	Williamson (2–2)	**Pfaadt** (0–4)	Díaz (29)	40,625	54–45	L3
100	July 23	@ Reds	3–7	Law (4–4)	**Gilbert** (0–1)	Sims (2)	30,811	54–46	L4
101	July 24	Cardinals	6–10	Gallegos (2–4)	**Chafin** (2–3)	—	23,184	54–47	L5
102	July 25	Cardinals	3–1	**K. Nelson** (5–2)	Romero (2–1)	**Ginkel** (3)	23,572	55–47	W1
103	July 26	Cardinals	7–11	Pallante (3–1)	**Gallen** (11–5)	—	22,457	55–48	L1
104	July 28	Mariners	2–5	Gilbert (9–5)	**Henry** (5–4)	Sewald (21)	31,697	55–49	L2
105	July 29	Mariners	4–3	**Ginkel** (4–0)	Muñoz (2–4)	**McGough** (8)	44,472	56–49	W1
106	July 30	Mariners	0–4	Castillo (7–7)	**Kelly** (9–5)	—	35,295	56–50	L1
107	July 31	@ Giants	4–3 (11)	**Ginkel** (5–0)	Rogers (5–4)	**McGough** (9)	28,404	57–50	W1

August: 12–15 (Home: 7–4; Away: 5–11)

#	Date	Opponent	Score	Win	Loss	Save	Attendance	Record	Streak
108	August 1	@ Giants	3–4	Walker (4–0)	**Castro** (5–5)	Manaea (1)	25,806	57–51	L1
109	August 2	@ Giants	2–4	Webb (9–9)	**Gilbert** (0–2)	Doval (32)	28,956	57–52	L2
110	August 3	@ Giants	0–1	Beck (3–0)	**Pfaadt** (0–5)	Doval (33)	33,087	57–53	L3
111	August 4	@ Twins	2–3	Thielbar (1–1)	**McGough** (1–7)	Durán (20)	29,408	57–54	L4
112	August 5	@ Twins	1–12	Maeda (3–6)	**R. Nelson** (6–6)	—	34,044	57–55	L5
113	August 6	@ Twins	3–5	Thielbar (2–1)	**Sewald** (3–2)	—	24,778	57–56	L6
114	August 8	Dodgers	4–5	Urías (9–6)	**Pfaadt** (0–6)	Phillips (15)	29,861	57–57	L7
115	August 9	Dodgers	0–2	Ferguson (6–3)	**K. Nelson** (5–3)	Phillips (16)	27,485	57–58	L8
116	August 11	Padres	5–10	Snell (9–8)	**R. Nelson** (6–7)	—	26,210	57–59	L9
117	August 12	Padres	3–0	**Gallen** (12–5)	Hill (7–12)	**Sewald** (22)	41,351	58–59	W1
118	August 13	Padres	5–4	**K. Nelson** (6–3)	Suárez (1–2)	**Sewald** (23)	29,277	59–59	W2
119	August 14	@ Rockies	4–6	Koch (2–0)	**Mantiply** (1–1)	Lawrence (10)	24,157	59–60	L1
120	August 15	@ Rockies	8–5	**Ginkel** (6–0)	Lawrence (3–6)	**Sewald** (24)	23,644	60–60	W1
121	August 16	@ Rockies	9–7	**K. Nelson** (7–3)	Kinley (0–1)	**Sewald** (25)	22,824	61–60	W2
122	August 17	@ Padres	3–1	**Gallen** (13–5)	Hill (7–13)	**Martinez** (1)	38,020	62–60	W3
123	August 18	@ Padres	0–4	Suárez (2–2)	**Castro** (5–6)	—	40,945	62–61	L1
124	August 19 (1)	@ Padres	6–4	**Kelly** (10–5)	Waldron (0–2)	**Sewald** (26)	34,220	63–61	W1
125	August 19 (2)	@ Padres	8–1	**Jarvis** (1–0)	Darvish (8–9)	—	41,074	64–61	W2
—	August 20	@ Padres	Rescheduled due to Hurricane Hilary;Moved to August 19						
126	August 21	Rangers	4–3 (11)	**Ginkel** (7–0)	Smith (1–5)	—	21,829	65–61	W3
127	August 22	Rangers	6–3	**Gallen** (14–5)	Gray (8–7)	**Sewald** (27)	19,003	66–61	W4
128	August 24	Reds	3–2	**Castro** (6–6)	Young (4–2)	**Sewald** (28)	18,827	67–61	W5
129	August 25	Reds	10–8	**Pfaadt** (1–6)	Greene (2–6)	**Ginkel** (4)	29,500	68–61	W6
130	August 26	Reds	7–8 (11)	Díaz (6–4)	**Crismatt** (0–2)	Sims (3)	34,028	68–62	L1
131	August 27	Reds	5–2	**McGough** (2–7)	Gibaut (8–3)	**Thompson** (1)	26,574	69–62	W1
132	August 28	@ Dodgers	4–7	Miller (8–3)	**Gallen** (14–6)	Ferguson (3)	36,521	69–63	L1
133	August 29	@ Dodgers	1–9	Kershaw (12–4)	**Kelly** (10–6)	—	42,323	69–64	L2
134	August 30	@ Dodgers	0–7	Pepiot (2–0)	**Pfaadt** (1–7)	Yarbrough (2)	50,953	69–65	L3

September/October: 15–13 (Home: 8–6; Away: 7–7)

#	Date	Opponent	Score	Win	Loss	Save	Attendance	Record	Streak
135	September 1	Orioles	4–2	**Davies** (2–5)	Irvin (1–4)	**Sewald** (29)	18,248	70–65	W1
136	September 2	Orioles	3–7	Bradish (10–6)	**Cecconi** (0–1)	—	34,118	70–66	L1
137	September 3	Orioles	5–8	Coulombe (5–1)	**Gallen** (14–7)	—	24,284	70–67	L2
138	September 4	Rockies	4–2	**Kelly** (11–6)	Lambert (3–6)	**Sewald** (30)	18,097	71–67	W1
139	September 5	Rockies	2–3	Freeland (6–14)	**Pfaadt** (1–8)	Kinley (2)	12,994	71–68	L1
140	September 6	Rockies	12–5	**Jarvis** (2–0)	Flexen (1–7)	—	11,044	72–68	W1
141	September 7	@ Cubs	6–2	**R. Nelson** (7–7)	Assad (3–3)	**Sewald** (31)	28,814	73–68	W2
142	September 8	@ Cubs	1–0	**Gallen** (15–7)	Cuas (3–1)	—	31,846	74–68	W3
143	September 9	@ Cubs	3–2 (10)	**Ginkel** (8–0)	Palencia (5–1)	**Sewald** (32)	40,391	75–68	W4
144	September 10	@ Cubs	2–5	Hendricks (6–7)	**Mantiply** (1–2)	Merryweather (1)	35,431	75–69	L1
145	September 11	@ Mets	4–3	**Ginkel** (9–0)	Smith (4–6)	**Sewald** (33)	25,230	76–69	W1
146	September 12	@ Mets	4–7	Butto (1–2)	**R. Nelson** (7–8)	Ottavino (10)	33,506	76–70	L1
147	September 13	@ Mets	1–7	Lucchesi (3–0)	**Gallen** (15–8)	—	22,026	76–71	L2
148	September 14	@ Mets	1–11	Senga (11–7)	**Kelly** (11–7)	—	22,879	76–72	L3
149	September 15	Cubs	6–4	**Pfaadt** (2–8)	Steele (16–4)	—	32,864	77–72	W1
150	September 16	Cubs	7–6 (13)	**Mantiply** (2–2)	Wesneski (2–5)	—	35,193	78–72	W2
151	September 17	Cubs	6–2	**Frías** (1–0)	Wicks (3–1)	—	26,307	79–72	W3
152	September 19	Giants	8–4	**Gallen** (16–8)	Cobb (7–7)	—	26,093	80–72	W4
153	September 20	Giants	7–1	**Kelly** (12–7)	Webb (10–13)	—	16,848	81–72	W5
154	September 22	@ Yankees	1–7	Weaver (3–5)	**Pfaadt** (2–9)	Brito (1)	39,143	81–73	L1
—	September 23	@ Yankees	Postponed (inclement weather); Makeup: September 25						
155	September 24	@ Yankees	7–1	**Gallen** (17–8)	Rodón (3–7)	—	39,018	82–73	W1
156	September 25	@ Yankees	4–6	Hamilton (3–2)	**Ginkel** (9–1)	Holmes (22)	41,096	82–74	L1
—	September 25	@ White Sox	Rescheduled to make room for Arizona at New York game); Rescheduled to September 28						
157	September 26	@ White Sox	15–4	**R. Nelson** (8–8)	Ureña (0–7)	—	14,339	83–74	W1
158	September 27	@ White Sox	3–0	**Pfaadt** (3–9)	Patiño (0–1)	**Sewald** (34)	14,790	84–74	W2
159	September 28	@ White Sox	1–3	Banks (1–4)	**Jarvis** (2–1)	Shaw (4)	23,522	84–75	L1
160	September 29	Astros	1–2	Urquidy (3–3)	**Gallen** (17–9)	Pressly (31)	36,133	84–76	L2
161	September 30	Astros	0–1	Verlander (13–8)	**Kelly** (12–8)	Abreu (5)	36,789	84–77	L3
162	October 1	Astros	1–8	Javier (10–5)	**K. Nelson** (7–4)	—	30,703	84–78	L4

=== Opening Day starting lineup ===
Thursday, March 30, 2023 vs. Los Angeles Dodgers at Dodger Stadium.

Name	Pos.
Kyle Lewis	DH
Ketel Marte	2B
Lourdes Gurriel Jr.	LF
Christian Walker	1B
Evan Longoria	3B
Nick Ahmed	SS
Corbin Carroll	CF
Gabriel Moreno	C
Jake McCarthy	RF
Zac Gallen	P

== Postseason ==
=== Game log ===
2023 Postseason Game Log (10–7)
NL Wild Card Series (2–0)

#	Date	Opponent	Score	Win	Loss	Save	Attendance	Record
1	October 3	@ Brewers	6–3	Mantiply (1–0)	Burnes (0–1)	Sewald (1)	40,892	1–0
2	October 4	@ Brewers	5–2	Gallen (1–0)	Peralta (0–1)	Sewald (2)	41,166	2–0

NL Division Series (3–0)

#	Date	Opponent	Score	Win	Loss	Save	Attendance	Record
1	October 7	@ Dodgers	11–2	Kelly (1–0)	Kershaw (0–1)	—	51,653	1–0
2	October 9	@ Dodgers	4–2	Gallen (2–0)	Miller (0–1)	Sewald (3)	51,449	2–0
3	October 11	Dodgers	4–2	Mantiply (2–0)	Lynn (0–1)	Sewald (4)	48,175	3–0

NL Championship Series (4–3)

#	Date	Opponent	Score	Win	Loss	Save	Attendance	Record
1	October 16	@ Phillies	3–5	Wheeler (2–0)	Gallen (2–1)	Kimbrel (3)	45,396	0–1
2	October 17	@ Phillies	0–10	Nola (3–0)	Kelly (1–1)	—	45,412	0–2
3	October 19	Phillies	2–1	Sewald (1–0)	Kimbrel (0–1)	—	47,075	1–2
4	October 20	Phillies	6–5	Ginkel (1–0)	Kimbrel (0–2)	Sewald (5)	47,806	2–2
5	October 21	Phillies	1–6	Wheeler (3–0)	Gallen (2–2)	—	47,897	2–3
6	October 23	@ Phillies	5–1	Kelly (2–1)	Nola (3–1)	—	45,473	3–3
7	October 24	@ Phillies	4–2	Thompson (1–0)	Suárez (1–1)	Sewald (6)	45,397	4–3

World Series (1–4)

#	Date	Opponent	Score	Win	Loss	Save	Attendance	Record
1	October 27	@ Rangers	5–6 (11)	Leclerc (1–1)	Castro (0–1)	—	42,472	0–1
2	October 28	@ Rangers	9–1	Kelly (3–1)	Montgomery (3–1)	—	42,500	1–1
3	October 30	Rangers	1–3	Gray (1–0)	Pfaadt (0–1)	Leclerc (4)	48,517	1–2
4	October 31	Rangers	7–11	Heaney (1–0)	Mantiply (2–1)	—	48,388	1–3
5	November 1	Rangers	0–5	Eovaldi (5–0)	Gallen (2–3)	Sborz (1)	48,511	1–4

=== Postseason rosters ===
Playoff rosters
National League Wild Card Series

- Pitchers: 19 Ryne Nelson 23 Zac Gallen 29 Merrill Kelly 32 Brandon Pfaadt 35 Joe Mantiply 37 Kevin Ginkel 38 Paul Sewald 40 Bryce Jarvis 50 Miguel Castro 57 Andrew Saalfrank 65 Luis Frías 81 Ryan Thompson
- Catchers: 11 José Herrera 14 Gabriel Moreno
- Infielders: 2 Geraldo Perdomo 3 Evan Longoria 4 Ketel Marte 6 Jace Peterson (Replaced Jake McCarthy due to injury) 10 Jordan Lawlar 15 Emmanuel Rivera 53 Christian Walker
- Outfielders: 5 Alek Thomas 7 Corbin Carroll 12 Lourdes Gurriel Jr. 26 Pavin Smith 28 Tommy Pham 31 Jake McCarthy (Replaced before Game 1)

National League Division Series

- Pitchers: 19 Ryne Nelson 23 Zac Gallen 24 Kyle Nelson 29 Merrill Kelly 32 Brandon Pfaadt 35 Joe Mantiply 37 Kevin Ginkel 38 Paul Sewald 50 Miguel Castro 57 Andrew Saalfrank 65 Luis Frías 81 Ryan Thompson
- Catchers: 11 José Herrera 14 Gabriel Moreno
- Infielders: 2 Geraldo Perdomo 3 Evan Longoria 4 Ketel Marte 6 Jace Peterson 10 Jordan Lawlar 15 Emmanuel Rivera 26 Pavin Smith 53 Christian Walker
- Outfielders: 5 Alek Thomas 7 Corbin Carroll 12 Lourdes Gurriel Jr. 28 Tommy Pham

National League Championship Series

- Pitchers: 19 Ryne Nelson 23 Zac Gallen 24 Kyle Nelson 29 Merrill Kelly 32 Brandon Pfaadt 35 Joe Mantiply 37 Kevin Ginkel 38 Paul Sewald 43 Slade Cecconi 50 Miguel Castro 57 Andrew Saalfrank 65 Luis Frías 81 Ryan Thompson
- Catchers: 11 José Herrera 14 Gabriel Moreno
- Infielders: 2 Geraldo Perdomo 3 Evan Longoria 4 Ketel Marte 10 Jordan Lawlar 15 Emmanuel Rivera 26 Pavin Smith 53 Christian Walker
- Outfielders: 5 Alek Thomas 7 Corbin Carroll 12 Lourdes Gurriel Jr. 28 Tommy Pham

World Series

- Pitchers: 19 Ryne Nelson 23 Zac Gallen 24 Kyle Nelson 29 Merrill Kelly 32 Brandon Pfaadt 35 Joe Mantiply 37 Kevin Ginkel 38 Paul Sewald 50 Miguel Castro 57 Andrew Saalfrank 65 Luis Frías 81 Ryan Thompson
- Catchers: 11 José Herrera 14 Gabriel Moreno
- Infielders: 2 Geraldo Perdomo 3 Evan Longoria 4 Ketel Marte 6 Jace Peterson 10 Jordan Lawlar 15 Emmanuel Rivera 26 Pavin Smith 53 Christian Walker
- Outfielders: 5 Alek Thomas 7 Corbin Carroll 12 Lourdes Gurriel Jr. 28 Tommy Pham

== Roster ==
2023 Arizona Diamondbacks
Roster
Pitchers: 55 Austin Adams; 40 Madison Bumgarner; 50 Miguel Castro; 43 Slade Cecconi; 57 Andrew Chafin; 61 Nabil Crismatt; 27 Zach Davies; 65 Luis Frías; 23 Zac Gallen; 49 Tyler Gilbert; 37 Kevin Ginkel; 47 Tommy Henry; 99 Drey Jameson; 40 Bryce Jarvis; 29 Merrill Kelly; 35 Joe Mantiply; 63 Justin Martínez; 30 Scott McGough; 36 Anthony Misiewicz; 24 Kyle Nelson; 19 Ryne Nelson; 32 Brandon Pfaadt; 66 José Ruiz; 57 Andrew Saalfrank; 38 Paul Sewald; 58 Peter Solomon; 33 Peter Strzelecki; 54 Cole Sulser; 81 Ryan Thompson; 45 Carlos Vargas	Catchers: 11 José Herrera; 18 Carson Kelly; 14 Gabriel Moreno; 59 Seby Zavala; Infielders: 13 Nick Ahmed; 16 Buddy Kennedy; 10 Jordan Lawlar; 3 Evan Longoria; 4 Ketel Marte; 2 Geraldo Perdomo; 6 Jace Peterson; 15,21 Emmanuel Rivera; 10 Josh Rojas; 53 Christian Walker	Outfielders: 6 Dominic Canzone; 7 Corbin Carroll; 8 Dominic Fletcher; 12 Lourdes Gurriel Jr.; 1 Kyle Lewis; 31 Jake McCarthy; 28 Tommy Pham; 26 Pavin Smith; 5 Alek Thomas; Other batters: 64 Diego Castillo	Manager: 17 Torey Lovullo; Coaches: 82 Jeff Banister (bench); 76 Dan Carlson (assistant pitching); 75 Damion Easley (assistant hitting); 77 Barry Enright (assistant pitching); 71 Mike Fetters (bullpen); 78 Drew Hedman (assistant hitting); 74 Joe Mather (hitting); 39 Dave McKay (first base); 69 Sharif Othman (bullpen catcher); 21 Tony Perezchica (third base); 83 Jose Queliz (bullpen catcher); 73 Rick Short (assistant hitting); 72 Brent Strom (pitching)

== Player statistics ==
= Indicates team leader

= Indicates league leader

=== Batting ===
Note: G = Games played; AB = At bats; R = Runs; H = Hits; 2B = Doubles; 3B = Triples; HR = Home runs; RBI = Runs batted in; SB = Stolen bases; BB = Walks; AVG = Batting average; SLG = Slugging average

Player	G	AB	R	H	2B	3B	HR	RBI	SB	BB	AVG	SLG
Christian Walker	157	582	86	150	36	2	33	103	11	62	.258	.497
Ketel Marte	150	569	94	157	26	9	25	82	8	71	.276	.485
Corbin Carroll	155	565	116	161	30	10	25	76	54	57	.285	.506
Lourdes Gurriel Jr.	145	551	65	144	35	2	24	82	5	33	.261	.463
Geraldo Perdomo	144	407	71	100	20	4	6	47	16	64	.246	.359
Alek Thomas	125	374	51	86	17	5	9	39	9	19	.230	.374
Gabriel Moreno	111	341	33	97	19	1	7	50	6	29	.284	.408
Jake McCarthy	99	276	37	67	7	5	2	16	26	26	.243	.326
Emmanuel Rivera	86	257	32	67	13	0	4	29	1	22	.261	.358
Evan Longoria	74	211	25	47	9	0	11	28	0	23	.223	.422
Nick Ahmed	72	198	14	42	10	1	2	17	5	12	.212	.303
Tommy Pham	50	195	26	47	12	2	6	32	11	18	.241	.415
Pavin Smith	69	191	26	36	5	0	7	30	1	35	.188	.325
Josh Rojas	59	189	23	43	13	0	0	26	6	18	.228	.296
José Herrera	41	101	15	21	5	0	0	7	1	13	.208	.257
Jace Peterson	41	93	5	17	3	2	0	9	4	11	.183	.258
Dominic Fletcher	28	93	10	28	5	1	2	14	0	7	.301	.441
Carson Kelly	32	84	6	19	3	0	1	6	1	7	.226	.298
Kyle Lewis	16	51	2	8	2	0	1	2	0	3	.157	.255
Dominic Canzone	15	38	4	9	2	0	1	8	0	2	.237	.368
Jordan Lawlar	14	31	2	4	0	0	0	0	1	2	.129	.129
Buddy Kennedy	10	24	1	4	1	0	0	1	0	4	.167	.208
Seby Zavala	7	14	2	5	1	0	0	2	0	2	.357	.429
Diego Castillo	1	1	0	0	0	0	0	0	0	0	.000	.000
Totals	162	5436	746	1359	274	44	166	706	166	540	.250	.408
Rank in NL	—	10	7	10	7	1	10	7	2	9	7	8

Source:2023 Arizona Diamondbacks Batting Statistics

=== Pitching ===
Note: W = Wins; L = Losses; ERA = Earned run average; G = Games pitched; GS = Games started; SV = Saves; IP = Innings pitched; H = Hits allowed; R = Runs allowed; ER = Earned runs allowed; BB = Walks allowed; SO = Strikeouts

Player	W	L	ERA	G	GS	SV	IP	H	R	ER	BB	SO
Zac Gallen	17	9	3.47	34	34	0	210.0	188	87	81	47	220
Merrill Kelly	12	8	3.29	30	30	0	177.2	143	71	65	69	187
Ryne Nelson	8	8	5.31	29	27	0	144.0	159	87	85	46	96
Brandon Pfaadt	3	9	5.72	19	18	0	96.0	109	63	61	26	94
Tommy Henry	5	4	4.15	17	16	0	89.0	86	42	41	35	64
Zach Davies	2	5	7.00	18	18	0	82.1	98	67	64	39	72
Scott McGough	2	7	4.73	63	1	9	70.1	60	40	37	30	86
Kevin Ginkel	9	1	2.48	60	0	4	65.1	41	24	18	23	70
Miguel Castro	6	6	4.31	75	0	7	64.2	51	32	31	25	60
Kyle Nelson	7	4	4.18	68	2	0	56.0	59	30	26	14	67
Drey Jameson	3	1	3.32	15	3	1	40.2	40	15	15	18	37
José Ruiz	2	1	4.43	34	1	0	40.2	44	22	20	17	36
Joe Mantiply	2	2	4.62	35	3	0	39.0	35	22	20	9	28
Andrew Chafin	2	3	4.19	43	0	8	34.1	31	17	16	18	49
Luis Frías	1	0	4.06	29	0	0	31.0	30	14	14	17	26
Slade Cecconi	0	1	4.33	7	4	0	27.0	27	13	13	4	20
Bryce Jarvis	2	1	3.04	11	1	0	23.2	14	9	8	9	12
Paul Sewald	0	1	3.57	20	0	13	17.2	16	8	7	10	20
Austin Adams	0	1	5.71	24	0	0	17.1	16	12	11	8	22
Tyler Gilbert	0	2	5.19	11	0	0	17.1	21	10	10	5	19
Madison Bumgarner	0	3	10.26	4	4	0	16.2	25	20	19	15	10
Peter Solomon	0	0	12.15	5	0	0	13.1	17	18	18	11	6
Ryan Thompson	0	0	0.69	13	0	1	13.0	6	1	1	1	9
Andrew Saalfrank	0	0	0.00	10	0	0	10.1	7	2	0	4	6
Justin Martínez	0	0	12.60	10	0	1	10.0	13	14	14	11	14
Anthony Misiewicz	1	0	5.63	7	0	0	8.0	11	5	5	3	6
Cole Sulser	0	0	6.75	4	0	0	5.1	5	4	4	3	4
Carlos Vargas	0	0	5.79	5	0	0	4.2	5	3	3	4	7
Nabil Crismatt	0	1	0.00	1	0	0	2.0	2	1	0	0	3
Carson Kelly	0	0	9.00	2	0	0	2.0	5	2	2	1	0
José Herrera	0	0	9.00	2	0	0	2.0	4	2	2	0	0
Josh Rojas	0	0	18.00	2	0	0	2.0	6	4	4	1	1
Peter Strzelecki	0	0	0.00	1	0	0	1.1	1	0	0	2	0
Seby Zavala	0	0	0.00	1	0	0	0.2	0	0	0	0	0
Totals	84	78	4.47	162	162	44	1435.1	1375	761	713	525	1351
Rank in NL	5	10	10	—	—	7	7	9	10	10	7	12

Source:2023 Arizona Diamondbacks Pitching Statistics

== Minor league affiliations ==
Level	Team	League	Location	Manager
Triple-A	Reno Aces	Pacific Coast League	Reno, Nevada	Blake Lalli
Double-A	Amarillo Sod Poodles	Texas League	Amarillo, Texas	Shawn Roof
High-A	Hillsboro Hops	Northwest League	Hillsboro, Oregon	Ronnie Gajownik
Low-A	Visalia Rawhide	California League	Visalia, California	Dee Garner
Rookie	ACL D-backs	Arizona Complex League	Scottsdale, Arizona	Gift Ngoepe
Rookie	DSL D-backs 1	Dominican Summer League	Boca Chica, Santo Domingo	Izzy Alcantara
Rookie	DSL D-backs 2	Dominican Summer League	Boca Chica, Santo Domingo	Izzy Alcantara
