= Ryne Nelson =

American baseball player (born 1998)

Arizona Diamondbacks – No. 19
- Pitcher
- Born: February 1, 1998 (age 28); Henderson, Nevada, U.S.
- Bats: Right Throws: Right

MLB debut
- September 5, 2022, for the Arizona Diamondbacks

MLB statistics (through 2026 season)
- Win–loss record: 29–23
- Earned run average: 4.30
- Strikeouts: 436
- Stats at Baseball Reference

Teams
- Arizona Diamondbacks (2022–present)

Ryne Tanner Nelson (born February 1, 1998) is an American professional baseball pitcher for the Arizona Diamondbacks of Major League Baseball (MLB). He made his MLB debut in 2022.

== Amateur career ==
Nelson attended Basic High School in Henderson. As a junior, he batted .412 with four home runs and 22 RBIs, along with pitching to a 6–1 record with a 2.03 ERA. In 2016, his senior year, he compiled a 1.91 ERA while batting .415, leading Basic to a state championship and earning a spot on the Nevada All-State team. Unselected out of high school in the 2016 MLB draft, he enrolled at the University of Oregon to play college baseball for the Oregon Ducks.

In 2017, as a freshman at Oregon, Nelson suffered an injury and pitched only 13 1/3 innings in which he had a 4.72 ERA. As a sophomore in 2018, he returned healthy and appeared in 16 games out of the bullpen, going 3–1 with a 3.86 ERA. He spent that summer playing in the Cape Cod Baseball League for the Yarmouth–Dennis Red Sox with whom he was named an All-Star. For the 2019 season, he was moved into the starting rotation, but returned to the bullpen after suffering a heel injury. He finished the year with a 3–4 record and a 4.29 ERA in 23 appearances (four starts), earning him a spot on the All-Pac-12 Team.

== Professional career ==
=== Minor leagues ===
Nelson was considered one of the top prospects for the 2019 MLB draft. He was selected by the Arizona Diamondbacks in the second round, with the 56th overall pick, and signed for $1.1 million. He was assigned to the Hillsboro Hops of the Low–A Northwest League, going 0–1 with a 2.89 ERA over 18 2/3 innings, striking out 26. Nelson did not play a minor league game in 2020 due to the cancellation of the minor league season caused by the COVID-19 pandemic.

To begin the 2021 season, Nelson returned to Hillsboro, now members of the High-A West league. After eight starts in which he pitched to a 4–1 record with a 2.52 ERA and 59 strikeouts over 39 1/3 innings, he was promoted to the Amarillo Sod Poodles of the Double-A Central. Over 14 starts with Amarillo, Nelson went 3–3 with a 3.51 ERA and 104 strikeouts over 77 innings. The Diamondbacks named Nelson their Minor League Pitcher of the Year.

Nelson was promoted to the Triple-A Reno Aces to begin the 2022 season. In 26 games, Nelson went 10–5 with a 5.43 ERA and 128 strikeouts over 136 innings.

=== Major leagues ===
On September 5, 2022, the Diamondbacks selected Nelson's contract and promoted him to the major leagues. He made his MLB debut that night as the club's starting pitcher against the San Diego Padres, throwing seven scoreless innings while striking out seven batters and walking zero in a 5-0 Diamondbacks win.

Nelson began the 2023 season on the opening-day roster for the Diamondbacks. On August 13, 2023, Nelson was optioned back to the Reno Aces to make room for Bryce Jarvis's debut and improve his pitching, with a 5.47 ERA in 24 starts before demotion. After pitching a 0–1 record with a 3.74 ERA and nine strikeouts over 21 2/3 innings with Reno, he was promoted back to the Diamondbacks rotation on September 6, 2023. Nelson ended the season with Arizona, pitching to an 8-8 record with 5.31 ERA and 96 strikeouts over 144 innings pitched.

Nelson spent the entirety of the 2024 season with Diamondbacks, appearing in 28 games (making 25 starts) and going 10–6 with a 4.24 ERA and 126 strikeouts over 150 2/3 innings.

Nelson opened the 2025 season in the Arizona bullpen before moving to the starting rotation following an injury to Corbin Burnes. On March 30, 2025, Nelson batted for the first time in his career after the Diamondbacks lost their designated hitter. Pinch-hitting in the bottom of the 8th inning, he hit an RBI single up the middle against Chicago Cubs reliever Eli Morgan, scoring Josh Naylor. He became the first full-time pitcher to get a hit since Zack Greinke in Game 4 of the 2021 World Series. Over 33 games (23 starts) for Arizona, Nelson went 7–3 with a 3.39 ERA and 132 strikeouts over 154 innings.

Nelson opened the 2026 season in Arizona's starting rotation. On June 19, 2026, he was placed on the 10-day injured list after suffering a flexor muscle strain and a mild ulnar collateral ligament sprain. On June 25, Nelson was transferred to the 60-day injured list. He was activated on September 16. Nelson made 19 appearances (15 starts) for the Diamondbacks and had a 3–5 record, a 4.95 ERA, and 66 strikeouts across 87 1/3 innings.

== Personal life ==
Nelson and his wife, Kaitlyn, were married in January 2025 in Phoenix.
