= Derrick Hall =

American sports executive (born 1969)

- Born: February 17, 1969 (age 57); Los Angeles, California, U.S.
- Education: Arizona State University (BA); Ohio University (MA)
- Occupation: Major League Baseball Executive
- Title: President and CEO, Arizona Diamondbacks
- Children: 3

Derrick Martin Hall (born February 17, 1969) is an American sports executive currently serving as the president and chief executive officer (CEO) of the Arizona Diamondbacks.

Hall joined the Diamondbacks in May 2005 as senior vice president and served in numerous capacities before being named president in September 2006 and adding the title of CEO in January 2009. Prior to joining the Diamondbacks, Hall served as senior vice president of the Los Angeles Dodgers and the Fortune 500 company KB Home.

== Early life and education ==
Hall was born in Los Angeles, California on February 17, 1969, to Annetta (née Goldberg) and Larry Hall. His father worked in the newspaper industry, which led to Hall moving throughout the United States during his childhood. He was raised in a Jewish household.

Although accepted to the United States Military Academy with a nomination from U.S. Senator Harry Reid, Hall attended Arizona State University on a speech and debate scholarship. He went on to receive a bachelor's degree in broadcasting and journalism, where he was named "Man of the Year" in 1991.

He later earned a master's degree from Ohio University in sports administration. In 2012, he received an honorary Doctorate degree from the University of Phoenix.

== Career ==
=== Los Angeles Dodgers ===
Hall spent parts of 12 seasons with the Los Angeles Dodgers, joining the organization's Single-A Florida State League affiliate in Vero Beach, Florida, as an intern in 1992 and departed as the club's senior vice president of communications in 2004.

Hall stepped outside of baseball during the 1999 season, as he hosted a morning talk show on the Dodgers' flagship station (XTRA 1150 AM), served as host of the "Dodger Game Day" pregame radio show, and worked as a weekend sports anchor at KNBC-TV (Ch. 4) in Los Angeles.

Prior to joining the D-backs, Hall made a brief stop as senior vice president of corporate communications for a Fortune 500 company, KB Home, based in Los Angeles, where he increased brand awareness.

During that time, he has also taught as an adjunct professor at the USC Annenberg School for Communication and Journalism and later at Arizona State University's Walter Cronkite School of Journalism and Mass Communication.

=== Arizona Diamondbacks ===
During Hall's tenure, the Diamondbacks won two National League West Division Championships (2007, '11), two Wild Cards (2017, '23), and made a World Series appearance (2023). Hall also negotiated the largest financial transaction in franchise history - a historic 20-year television rights deal with FOX and brought the MLB All-Star Game and World Baseball Classic to Chase Field.

In 2011, Hall unveiled Salt River Fields at Talking Stick, the D-backs' $200 million, 140-acre Spring Training facility shared with the Colorado Rockies on Salt River Indian Community land near Scottsdale, Arizona, that he negotiated and designed.

The Arizona Diamondbacks Foundation surpassed the $60 million mark in charitable in 2018 under Hall's direction. The corporate culture of the D-backs, created by Hall, led Yahoo! and Forbes to deem the club as "the best workplace in sports."

== Personal life ==
Hall and his wife are parents to three children.

During the 2011 baseball season, Hall was diagnosed with prostate cancer. Hall become a tireless advocate of cancer-fighting charities while continuing to speak publicly about the health challenges he faced. In 2014, he launched his own 501(c)(3) organization, the Derrick Hall Pro-State Foundation.

In an interview Hall said about having cancer, "It certainly makes you appreciate life. You realize how important family members are. I really cherish each and every day with my wife and kids. It has changed me. No doubt. Having cancer wakes you up. It forces you to live a happier lifestyle, but it also forces you to enjoy each and every day and count your blessings."
