= Carson Kelly =

American baseball player (born 1994)

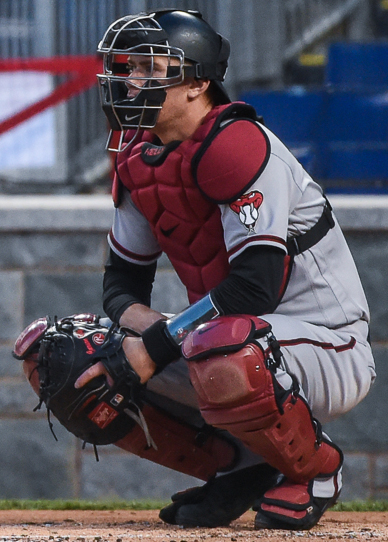
- Kelly with the Arizona Diamondbacks in 2021

Free agent
- Catcher
- Born: July 14, 1994 (age 32); Chicago, Illinois, U.S.
- Bats: Right Throws: Right

MLB debut
- September 5, 2016, for the St. Louis Cardinals

MLB statistics (through 2026 season)
- Batting average: .234
- Home runs: 81
- Runs batted in: 315
- Stats at Baseball Reference

Teams
- St. Louis Cardinals (2016–2018); Arizona Diamondbacks (2019–2023); Detroit Tigers (2023–2024); Texas Rangers (2024); Chicago Cubs (2025–2026)

Carson Franklin Kelly (born July 14, 1994) is an American professional baseball catcher who is a free agent. He has previously played in Major League Baseball (MLB) for the St. Louis Cardinals, Arizona Diamondbacks, Detroit Tigers, Texas Rangers, and Chicago Cubs.

Born in Chicago, Kelly was raised in Beaverton, Oregon. After a standout amateur career at Westview High School, he was selected by the Cardinals in the second round of the 2012 MLB draft. By his second professional season, he had switched from playing third base to catching. In the coming years, Baseball America rated him among the Cardinals' top prospects, twice naming him St. Louis's best defensive catcher. Kelly made his MLB debut in 2016 and saw limited playing time before being traded to the Diamondbacks after the 2018 season. He became Arizona's starting catcher in 2019, tying Miguel Montero's Diamondbacks record for the most home runs hit by a catcher in a season with 18.

After being released by Arizona during the 2023 season, Kelly signed with Detroit before being traded to Texas at the 2024 trade deadline. He signed with Chicago as a free agent following the 2024 season.

== Early life and career ==
Carson Franklin Kelly was born on July 14, 1994, in Chicago, Illinois. His parents, Mike and Traci, are Chicago natives. Mike worked as a Global Brand Marketing Director for Nike. Kelly grew up a fan of the Chicago Cubs. His favorite player, however, was Derek Jeter, who "always seemed to find a way to win". For most of his childhood, Kelly lived in Beaverton, Oregon, a suburb of Portland, although he and his family also briefly lived in Toronto around when Kelly was 12.

At the age of four, Kelly started playing baseball. He also played hockey while he lived in Toronto. Kelly attended Stoller Middle School and Westview High School in Beaverton, Oregon. He was a star player for Westview's baseball team, where he played the infield and also pitched. In 2011, his junior year, he appeared in the Under Armour All-America Baseball Game, a national high school all-star game. He was named the Gatorade Oregon Player of the Year in 2011 and 2012. He also won gold medals in the 2011 World Youth Baseball Championship and an under-18 international tournament.

== Professional career ==
=== St. Louis Cardinals ===
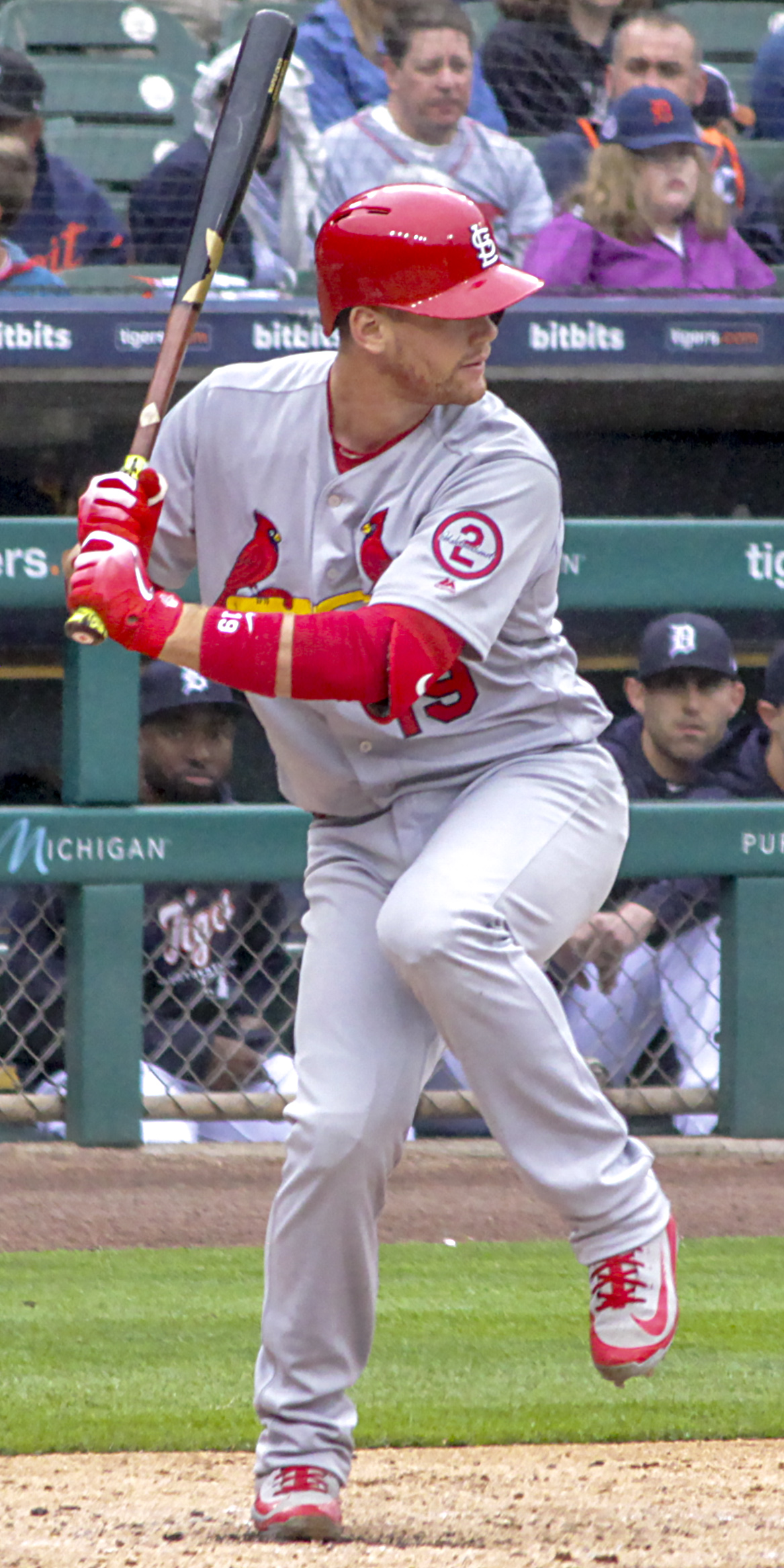
Kelly batting with St. Louis, 2018

==== Minor leagues ====
The St. Louis Cardinals selected Kelly as a third baseman in the second round, 86th overall, of the 2012 Major League Baseball (MLB) draft. Though Kelly had committed to the University of Oregon to play college baseball for the Oregon Ducks, he signed with the Cardinals instead, receiving a $1.6 million signing bonus. He began his professional career that year with the Johnson City Cardinals of the Rookie-level Appalachian League, batting .225 with nine home runs and 25 runs batted in (RBIs) in 56 games. In 2013, he was promoted to the Peoria Chiefs of the Single–A Midwest League. He struggled with Peoria, and was demoted to the State College Spikes of the Low–A New York–Penn League. In 113 games between the two clubs he batted .257 with 6 home runs and 45 RBIs.

In 2013, Kelly and Gary LaRocque, the Cardinals' director of player development, discussed his switching positions to catcher. Kelly believed the switch would make him more valuable in the Cardinals' system and began to transition during the 2013–14 offseason. Entering the 2014 season, Baseball America ranked him the 11th-best prospect for the Cardinals, and Baseball Prospectus ranked him St. Louis's sixth best. He played for Peoria in 2014, and batted .248 with six home runs and 49 RBIs in 98 games. He spent the 2015 season with the Palm Beach Cardinals of the High–A Florida State League and compiled a .219 batting average with eight home runs and 51 RBIs in 108 games. He won the 2015 minor leagues Rawlings Gold Glove Award for catchers.

Kelly was ranked the fourth-best prospect in the Cardinals system in 2016 by Baseball America. He began the 2016 season with the Springfield Cardinals of the Double–A Texas League. He was selected to the 2016 Texas League All-Star Game and to the 2016 All-Star Futures Game. After batting .287 with 6 home runs and 18 RBI in 64 games for Springfield, Kelly was promoted to the Memphis Redbirds of the Triple–A Pacific Coast League on July 11, 2016.

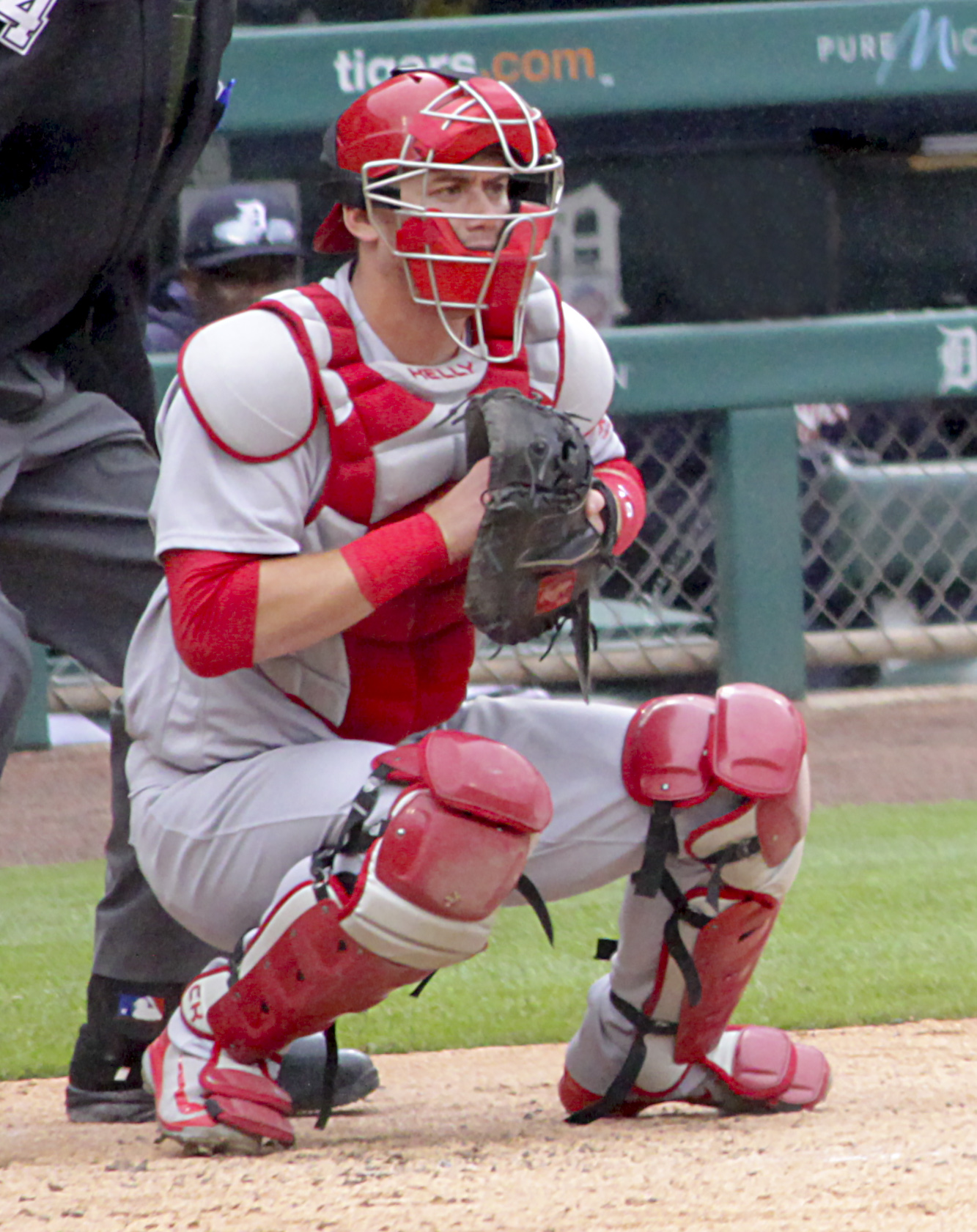
Kelly catching for the Cardinals in 2018

==== Major leagues ====
The Cardinals purchased Kelly's contract on September 4, 2016, promoting him to the major leagues as part of September callups. In 96 games between Springfield and Memphis prior to his call up he compiled a .289 batting average/.343 on-base percentage/.395 slugging percentage with six home runs and 32 RBIs. He made his major league debut on September 5 against the Pittsburgh Pirates. In his first at bat, he hit a line drive double in the eighth inning. He then scored his first run as the Cardinals won 12–6. Kelly appeared in 10 games with St. Louis in 2016, batting .154 with one RBI. After the season, the Cardinals assigned Kelly to the Glendale Desert Dogs of the Arizona Fall League (AFL). In 21 games for Glendale, he batted .286 with 3 home runs and 18 RBIs. The Cardinals also named Kelly their 2016 Minor League Player of the Year.

Prior to 2017, Baseball America ranked Kelly the Cardinals' third-best prospect and best defensive catcher. He returned to Memphis to begin 2017. On April 11, he hit multiple home runs against the Colorado Springs Sky Sox. He was named the Cardinals Minor League Player of the Month for May after batting .381 with a .447 on-base percentage. He had a game-ending RBI single against the Round Rock Express on July 14, his 23rd birthday. In 68 games for Memphis, he posted a .283 batting average with ten home runs and 41 RBIs. He was recalled to St. Louis on July 21, replacing Eric Fryer, who was designated for assignment, as the backup to Yadier Molina. In the game that day, he had a two-RBI double as St. Louis beat the Chicago Cubs 11–4. He spent the remainder of the season with the Cardinals. In 34 games for St. Louis he batted .174/.240/.217.

MLB.com ranked Kelly as St. Louis's third-best prospect going into the 2018 season, while Baseball America ranked him as St. Louis's best defensive catcher. He began the season with Memphis and received his first 2018 promotion to the major leagues on May 6 when Molina was placed on the disabled list. However, Kelly was placed on the disabled list on May 17 with a right hamstring sprain. He was not injured long, returning to the active roster on May 26. On June 4, he was optioned to Memphis, as the Cardinals elected to keep Francisco Peña as Molina's backup. In 83 games for Memphis, he batted .269 with 7 home runs and 41 RBIs. He was again recalled by St. Louis when rosters expanded on September 1. In 19 games for St. Louis, he batted .114 with no home runs and three RBIs.

=== Arizona Diamondbacks ===
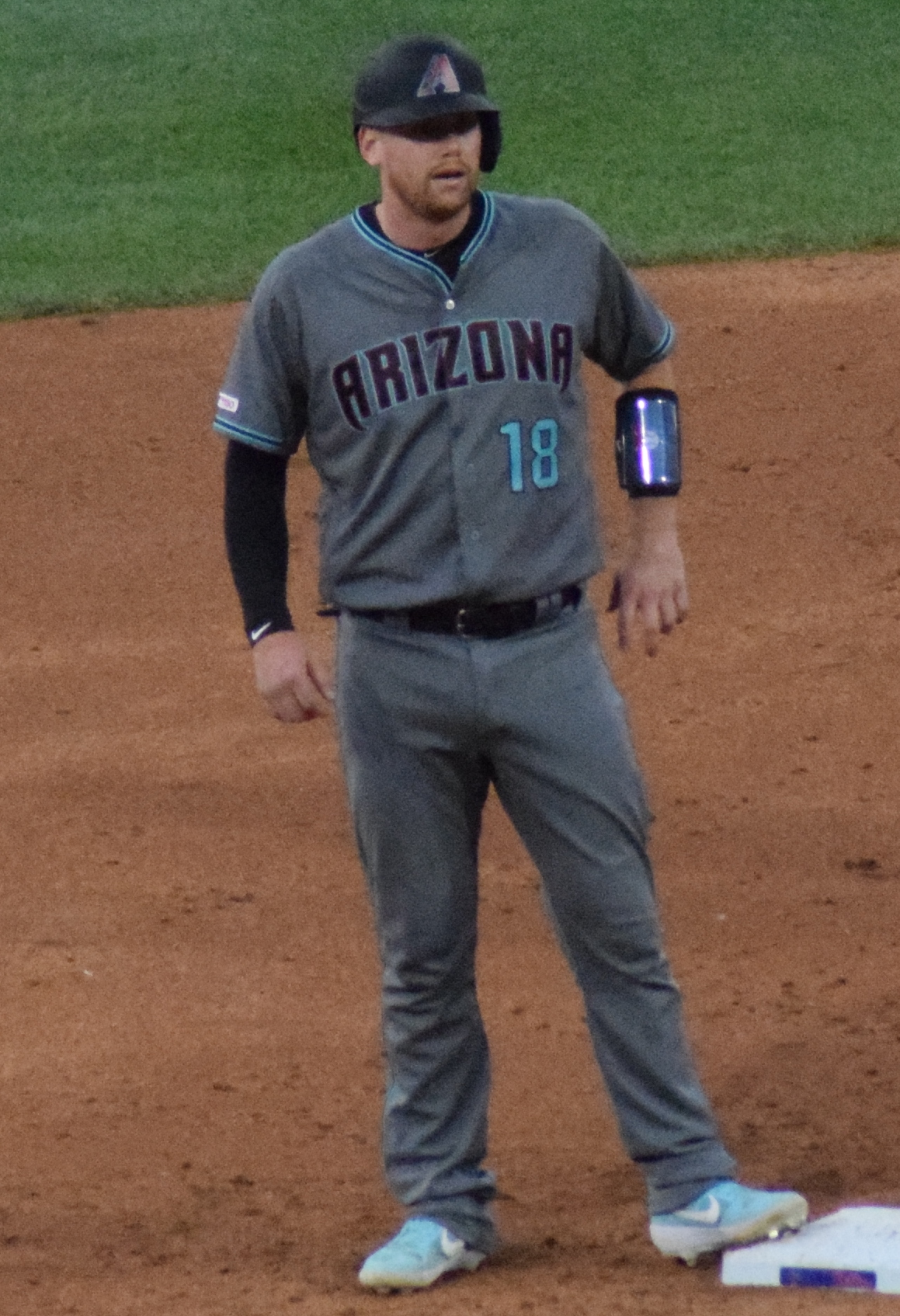
Kelly on base with the Diamondbacks

On December 5, 2018, the Cardinals traded Kelly, Luke Weaver, Andy Young, and a draft pick to the Arizona Diamondbacks in exchange for first baseman Paul Goldschmidt.

Prior to the 2019 season, Baseball America ranked Kelly the Diamondbacks' fourth-best prospect and best defensive catcher. The Diamondbacks started the season with three catchers. Manager Torey Lovullo hoped that Kelly, Alex Avila, and John Ryan Murphy would be a "three-headed monster" at the position. His first game with the Diamondbacks started on March 29 against the Los Angeles Dodgers, a game that lasted for six hours and five minutes, setting a record for the longest ever played at Dodger Stadium. Kelly had a pinch-hit RBI in the top of the 13th, helping Arizona win 5–4. Against the Boston Red Sox on April 6, he had three RBIs, including a go-ahead RBI single in the bottom of the ninth inning to give Arizona a 5–4 victory. On May 4, he hit his first career home run, the second of back-to-back homers against Kyle Freeland as Arizona beat the Colorado Rockies 9–2. The Diamondbacks designated Murphy for assignment on May 25, leaving Kelly and Avila as the team's main catchers. On July 3, Kelly's home run against Kenley Jansen put the Diamondbacks ahead in the ninth, though they eventually lost 5–4 to the Dodgers in 10 innings. His three-run home run against John Means on July 24 helped the Diamondbacks beat the Baltimore Orioles 5–2. He had his first multi-home run game on August 9, tying a game against the Dodgers with a two-run blast in the ninth inning and hitting a solo shot in the 11th to secure a 3–2 victory. In 2019, Kelly batted .245/.348/.478 with 18 home runs and 47 RBIs over 111 games. His 18 home runs tied Miguel Montero's Diamondbacks record for the most home runs hit by a catcher in a season.

The 2020 season did not start until July 24 due to the impact of COVID-19. On August 9, after starting pitcher Madison Bumgarner struggled and lasted only two innings, Kelly pitched a scoreless inning during a blowout loss to the San Diego Padres. Kelly appeared in a majority of games at the catching position in 2020, splitting time with Stephen Vogt but getting most of the September starts. In 39 games, Kelly batted .221 with five home runs and 19 RBIs.

Kelly began the 2021 season hitting .338 with 6 home runs before being placed on the injured list (IL) on May 17 with a toe fracture. He was activated on May 25. However, he only batted .171 over his next 22 games. On June 19, Kelly suffered another fracture, this time to his wrist, and was once again placed on the IL. He returned on July 30. Kelly played in 104 games for the Diamondbacks during the 2022 campaign, batting .211/.282/.334 with seven home runs and 35 RBI.

On January 13, 2023, Kelly agreed to a one-year, $4.275 million contract with the Diamondbacks, avoiding salary arbitration. On March 20, Kelly left a spring training game after he was hit in the arm by a pitch from Chicago White Sox reliever Gregory Santos. The next day, he was diagnosed with a fractured right forearm. Kelly was placed on the 60-day injured list on May 20. After an eight–game rehab assignment with the Triple–A Reno Aces, Kelly was activated and assumed the roster spot of José Herrera, who was sent down to Triple–A. In 32 games for the Diamondbacks, he batted .226/.283/.298 with one home run and six RBIs. On August 13, Kelly was designated for assignment following the promotion of Bryce Jarvis. He was released by the Diamondbacks on August 15.

=== Detroit Tigers ===
On August 19, 2023, Kelly signed a major league contract with the Detroit Tigers that included a club option for the 2024 season. The option, worth $3.5 million, was picked up on November 6. despite Kelly hitting .173 in 18 games for Detroit.

Kelly appeared in 60 contests for the Tigers in 2024, hitting .240/.325/.391 with seven home runs and 29 RBI.

=== Texas Rangers ===
On July 28, 2024, the Tigers traded Kelly to the Texas Rangers in exchange for Tyler Owens and Liam Hicks. In 31 games for Texas, Kelly batted .235/.291/.343 with two home runs and eight RBI.

=== Chicago Cubs ===
On December 13, 2024, Kelly signed a two-year, $10 million contract with the Chicago Cubs. The deal included a mutual option for 2027 worth $7.5 million and a $1.5 million buyout should the option be declined. On March 31, 2025, Kelly hit for the cycle in just his third game with the team, in an 18–3 victory against the Athletics, becoming the first Cub to achieve the feat since Mark Grace in 1993, and the first player in MLB history to hit for the cycle in the month of March.

On October 30, 2026, Kelly declined his half of a mutual contract option and became a free agent.

== Personal life ==
Kelly and his wife, Eloise, married in 2020. A golfer, Kelly participated in the 2020 Waste Management Pro Am. His younger brother, Parker, played college baseball for the University of Oregon and was drafted by the Cardinals in the 20th round of the 2018 MLB draft. Parker played for two seasons in the minor leagues for the Cardinals before moving on to independent league baseball.

Achievements
Preceded by Weston Wilson	Hitting for the cycle March 31, 2025	Succeeded by Byron Buxton
