= Kyle Nelson (baseball) =

American baseball player (born 1996)

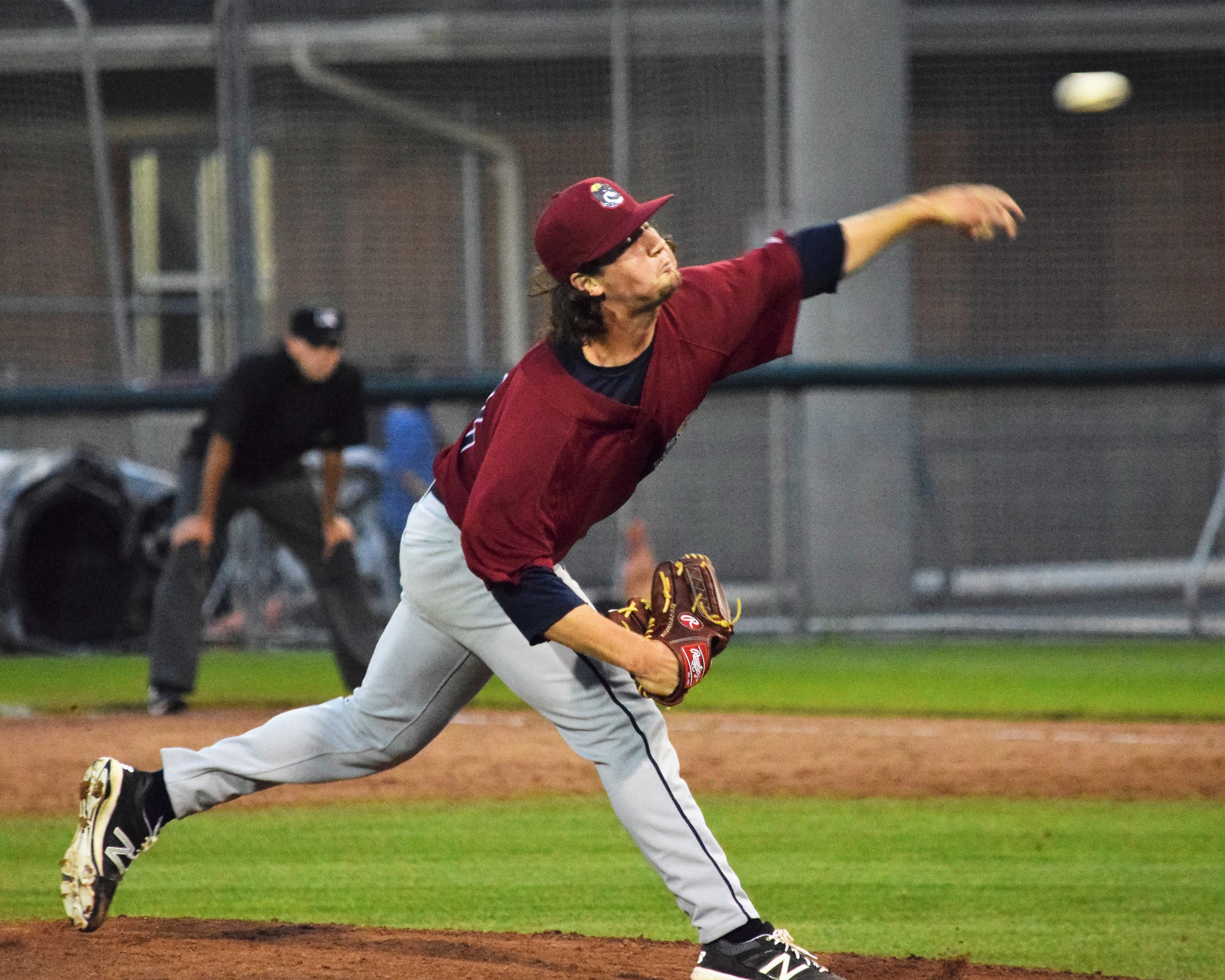
- Nelson with the Mahoning Valley Scrappers in 2017

Free agent
- Pitcher
- Born: July 8, 1996 (age 30); San Francisco, California, U.S.
- Bats: Left Throws: Left

MLB debut
- September 10, 2020, for the Cleveland Indians

MLB statistics (through 2025 season)
- Win–loss record: 9–5
- Earned run average: 4.34
- Strikeouts: 115
- Stats at Baseball Reference

Teams
- Cleveland Indians (2020–2021); Arizona Diamondbacks (2022–2025)

Kyle Bartlett Nelson (born July 8, 1996) is an American professional baseball pitcher who is a free agent. He has previously played in Major League Baseball (MLB) for the Cleveland Indians and Arizona Diamondbacks.

== Amateur career ==
Nelson attended Galileo Academy of Science and Technology in San Francisco, California, where he played football and baseball. He went undrafted in the 2014 Major League Baseball draft out of high school, and enrolled at the University of California, Santa Barbara where he played college baseball for the Santa Barbara Gauchos.

In 2015, Nelson's freshman year at UC Santa Barbara, he pitched to a 3–1 record and a 0.75 ERA, striking out 32 batters over 36 relief innings pitched, earning Freshman All-American honors. He played in the Northwoods League after the season. As a sophomore in 2016, he appeared in 33 games, going 7–2 with a 2.18 ERA, striking out 87 batters in 74 innings. He was named to the All-Big West First Team. In 2017, his junior season, he moved to the starting rotation. For the year, he made 15 starts, pitching to a 6–4 record and a 4.53 ERA over 87 innings.

== Professional career ==
=== Cleveland Indians ===
Nelson was selected by the Cleveland Indians in the 15th round of the 2017 Major League Baseball draft.

After signing with Cleveland, Nelson made his professional debut with the Mahoning Valley Scrappers where he went 3–2 with a 2.48 ERA over 29 innings pitched in relief. In 2018, he began the season with the Lake County Captains where he was named a Midwest League All-Star before being promoted to the Lynchburg Hillcats in August. Over 45 2/3 innings pitched between the two clubs, he compiled a 6–1 record and a 1.58 ERA, striking out 67 and walking nine. Nelson began 2019 with Lynchburg before being promoted to the Akron RubberDucks in May where he earned Eastern League All-Star honors. In August, he was promoted to the Columbus Clippers, with whom he finished the year. Over 42 games with the three teams, he went 4–4 with a 2.28 ERA and 69 strikeouts over 47 1/3 innings.

The Indians selected Nelson's contract on September 9, 2020. He made his major league debut the next day against the Kansas City Royals, giving up four earned runs over 2/3 of an inning; this was his only appearance for Cleveland for the 2020 season. In 2021, Nelson pitched 9 2/3 innings in relief for the Indians, giving up ten runs, striking out eight, and walking eight. While not with Cleveland, he pitched for the Clippers, with whom he went 0–1 with a 6.66 ERA, twenty walks, and thirty strikeouts over 25 2/3 innings.

Nelson was designated for assignment by the newly named Cleveland Guardians on November 19, 2021.

=== Arizona Diamondbacks ===
Nelson was claimed off waivers by the Arizona Diamondbacks on November 24, 2021. He was assigned to the Triple-A Reno Aces to begin the 2022 season, and was recalled on April 10, 2022. Nelson made a career-high 43 appearances, posting a 2–1 record and 2.19 ERA with 30 strikeouts in 37 innings pitched.

Nelson was initially optioned to Triple-A Reno to begin the 2023 season. However, after Joe Mantiply suffered an injury, he was placed in the Opening Day bullpen. In 68 appearances for the Diamondbacks, Nelson registered a 7–4 record and 4.18 ERA with 67 strikeouts across 56 innings pitched.

In 2024, Nelson posted a 4.22 ERA in 11 games before he was placed on the injured list with left shoulder inflammation on April 23, 2024. He was transferred to the 60–day injured list on April 30. The same day, it was announced that Nelson would undergo surgery for thoracic outlet syndrome.

Nelson was optioned to Triple-A Reno to begin the 2025 season, but struggled to an 8.47 ERA with 12 strikeouts over 17 innings of work. Nelson was designated for assignment by the Diamondbacks on July 2, 2025. He cleared waivers and was sent outright to Reno on July 6. On August 1, the Diamondbacks added Nelson back to their active roster. In three appearances for Arizona, he struggled to a 9.00 ERA with two strikeouts and one save over two innings of work. On November 6, Nelson was removed from the 40-man roster and sent outright to Reno. He elected free agency the same day.

=== Atlanta Braves ===
On February 25, 2026, Nelson signed a minor league contract with the Atlanta Braves organization. He was released by the Braves on March 21.
