= José Herrera (catcher) =

Venezuelan baseball player (born 1997)

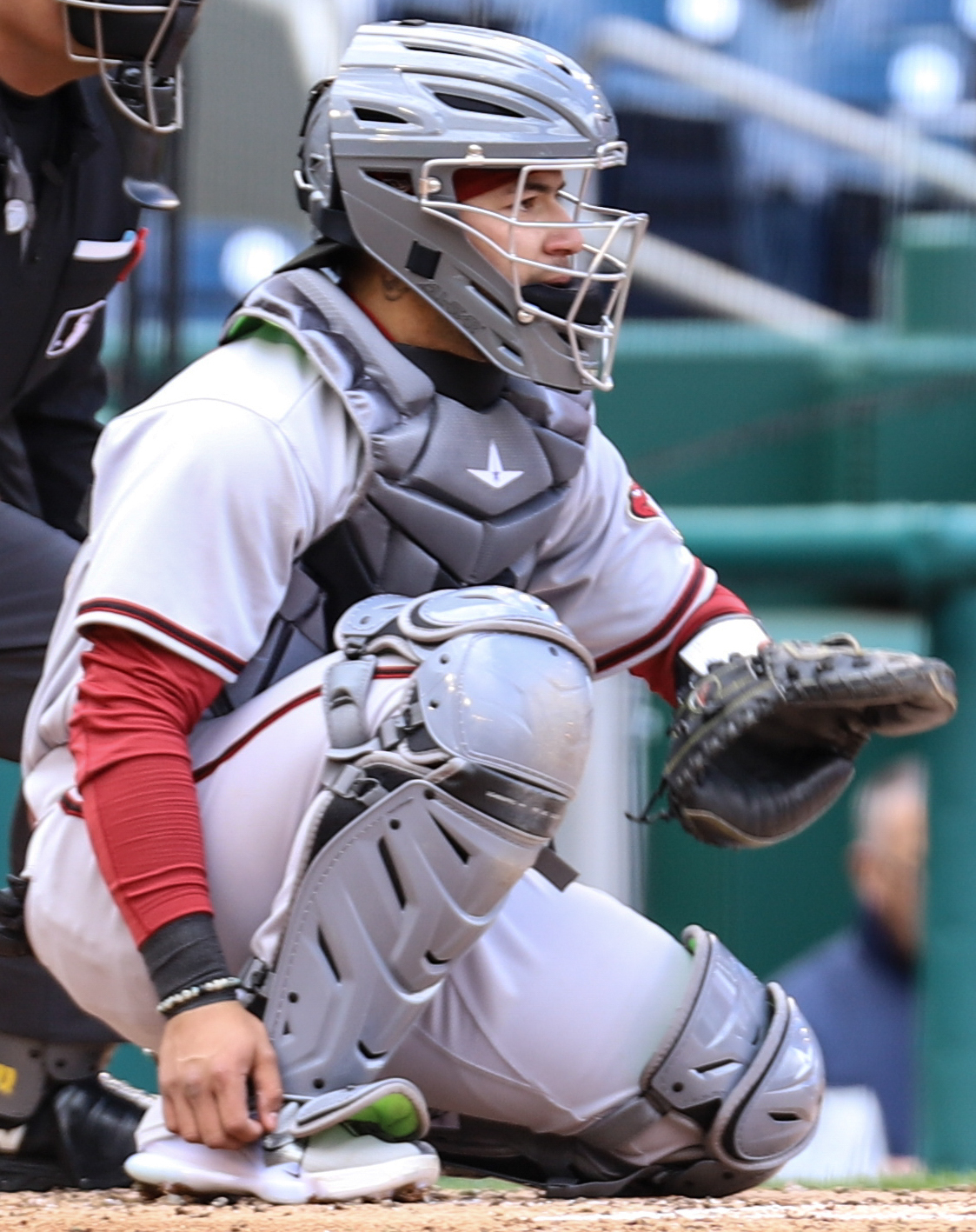
- Herrera with the Diamondbacks in 2022

Free agent
- Catcher
- Born: February 24, 1997 (age 29); San Carlos, Venezuela
- Bats: Switch Throws: Right

MLB debut
- April 9, 2022, for the Arizona Diamondbacks

MLB statistics (through 2025 season)
- Batting average: .200
- Home runs: 3
- Runs batted in: 42
- Stats at Baseball Reference

Teams
- Arizona Diamondbacks (2022–2025)

José Gregorio Herrera (born February 24, 1997) is a Venezuelan professional baseball catcher who is a free agent. He has previously played in Major League Baseball (MLB) for the Arizona Diamondbacks.

== Career ==
=== Arizona Diamondbacks ===
The Arizona Diamondbacks signed Herrera as a free agent on July 8, 2013. Herrera made his professional debut in 2014, spending time with the rookie-level Arizona League Diamondbacks and the rookie-level Missoula Osprey. In 2015, Herrera spent the season with the AZL Diamondbacks, hitting .304/.415/.380 in 24 games with the team. He returned to Missoula the following season, posting a slash line of .277/.351/.438 with 5 home runs and 18 RBI in 36 games. Herrera split the 2017 season between the AZL Diamondbacks and the Single-A Kane County Cougars, with whom he spent the majority of the year. In 66 games between the two affiliates, Herrera slashed .227/.291/.318 with one home run and 29 RBI.

On April 10, 2018, Herrera was suspended 50 games after testing positive for methylhexaneamine and oxilofrine, which were both listed as banned substances under the Minor League Drug Prevention and Treatment Program. He only played in 38 games in 2018 due to the suspension. In 2019, Herrera split the year between Kane County and the High-A Visalia Rawhide, slashing .252/.383/.371 with 5 home runs and 43 RBI in 90 total games. Herrera did not play in a game in 2020 due to the cancellation of the minor league season because of the COVID-19 pandemic. He split the 2021 season between the Double-A Amarillo Sod Poodles and the Triple-A Reno Aces, batting a combined .258/.364/.422 with career-highs in home runs (11) and RBI (57).

The Diamondbacks added him to their 40-man roster following the season on November 8, 2021. Herrera made the Diamondbacks' Opening Day roster in 2022 as the backup catcher to Carson Kelly. He made his MLB debut on April 9, as the starting catcher against the San Diego Padres. He got his first hit on April 22, after starting his MLB career 0-for-13. In 47 games during his rookie campaign, Herrera hit .189/.250/.207 with no home runs and 5 RBI.

In 2023, Herrera played in 43 games for the Diamondbacks, batting .208/.296/.257 with no home runs and 7 RBI. Herrera was optioned to Triple-A Reno to begin the 2024 season. He was called up to split catching duties with Adrian Del Castillo when starter Gabriel Moreno was injured, ultimately batting .227/.290/.320 with one home run and 13 RBI over 42 games.

Herrera was praised by manager Torey Lovullo and general manager Mike Hazen as a good teammate and "true Arizona Diamondback" in spring training in 2025. Herrera made 57 appearances for the Diamondbacks in 2025, slashing .187/.285/.259 with two home runs and 17 RBI in a career high 202 plate appearances. His last hit in the majors was a two-run home run at Coors Field in Denver. He was designated for assignment by Arizona upon Moreno's return from the injured list on August 22. He cleared waivers and was sent outright to Triple-A Reno on August 25, where he finished the season. Herrera elected free agency on October 3.

=== Texas Rangers ===
On December 15, 2025, Herrera signed a minor league contract with the Texas Rangers. In 40 appearances for the Triple–A Round Rock Express, he batted .229/.344/.321 with two home runs, 11 RBI, and one stolen base. Herrera was released by the Rangers organization on July 17, 2026.

=== Charros de Jalisco ===
On August 4, 2026, Herrera signed with the Charros de Jalisco of the Mexican League. Herrera made two appearances for Jalisco, going 3–for–8 (.375) with four RBI.

=== Pittsburgh Pirates ===
On September 1, 2026, Herrera signed a minor league contract with the Pittsburgh Pirates. He did not appear in a game with the organization prior to the conclusion of the season. He elected free agency on November 2.
