= Luis Frías (baseball) =

Dominican baseball player (born 1998)

Saraperos de Saltillo – No. 65
- Pitcher
- Born: May 23, 1998 (age 28); Río San Juan, Dominican Republic
- Bats: Right Throws: Right

MLB debut
- September 19, 2021, for the Arizona Diamondbacks

MLB statistics (through 2024 season)
- Win–loss record: 2–2
- Earned run average: 7.38
- Strikeouts: 55
- Stats at Baseball Reference

Teams
- Arizona Diamondbacks (2021–2024); Toronto Blue Jays (2024)

Luis David Frías (born May 23, 1998) is a Dominican professional baseball pitcher for the Saraperos de Saltillo of the Mexican League. He has previously played in Major League Baseball (MLB) for the Arizona Diamondbacks and Toronto Blue Jays.

== Career ==
=== Arizona Diamondbacks ===
On November 24, 2015, Frías signed with the Arizona Diamondbacks as an international free agent. He made his professional debut in 2016 with the Dominican Summer League Diamondbacks, where he posted a 3.83 ERA with 47 strikeouts in 13 games (11 starts). Frías missed the entirety of the 2017 campaign as the result of an injury.

Frías returned to action in 2018 with the rookie-level Arizona League Diamondbacks and Low-A Hillsboro Hops. In 14 games (13 starts) split between the two affiliates, he accumulated a 1–5 record and 2.80 ERA with 58 strikeouts across 54 2/3 innings pitched. Frías split 2019 between Hillsboro and the Single-A Kane County Cougars, registering a 6–4 record and 2.83 ERA with 101 strikeouts in 76 1/3 innings pitched across 16 starts.

Frías did not play in a game in 2020 due to the cancellation of the minor league season because of the COVID-19 pandemic. On November 20, 2020, the Diamondbacks added Frías to their 40-man roster to protect him from the Rule 5 draft.

On February 22, 2021, Frías was placed on the reserve/COVID-19 list as he continued to recover from the virus. He was called up for his MLB debut on September 19. In 3 games during his rookie campaign, Frías recorded a 2.70 ERA with 3 strikeouts across 3 1/3 innings pitched. He made 15 appearances for Arizona in 2022, struggling to a 10.59 ERA with 14 strikeouts across 17 innings.

Frías was optioned to the Triple-A Reno Aces to begin the 2023 season. He made 29 appearances out of the bullpen for Arizona, posting a 4.06 ERA with 26 strikeouts across 31 innings pitched. He made seven postseason appearances, with a 1.35 ERA and 8 strikeouts in 6 2/3 innings, as the Diamondbacks reached the World Series.

In 7 appearances for the Diamondbacks in 2024, Frías struggled to a 9.95 ERA with 7 strikeouts across 6 1/3 innings pitched. On August 8, 2024, Frías was designated for assignment following the acquisition of Andrew Knizner.

=== Toronto Blue Jays ===
On August 10, 2024, Frías was claimed off waivers by the Toronto Blue Jays. In 4 games for the Blue Jays, he struggled to a 21.60 ERA with 5 strikeouts over 3 1/3 innings pitched. On November 4, Frías was removed from the 40-man roster and sent outright to the Triple-A Buffalo Bisons, but he rejected the assignment and elected free agency.

=== Cleveland Guardians ===
On January 2, 2025, Frías signed a minor league contract with the Cleveland Guardians. In 30 appearances for the Triple-A Columbus Clippers, he logged a 2–0 record and 3.00 ERA with 35 strikeouts and four saves over 36 innings of work. Frías was released by the Guardians organization on August 11.

=== Saraperos de Saltillo ===
On April 14, 2026, Frías signed with the Saraperos de Saltillo of the Mexican League.
