= Drey Jameson =

American baseball player (born 1997)

Arizona Diamondbacks – No. 99
- Pitcher
- Born: August 17, 1997 (age 29); Greenfield, Indiana, U.S.
- Bats: Right Throws: Right

MLB debut
- September 15, 2022, for the Arizona Diamondbacks

MLB statistics (through 2026 season)
- Win–loss record: 6–2
- Earned run average: 3.19
- Strikeouts: 74
- Stats at Baseball Reference

Teams
- Arizona Diamondbacks (2022–2023, 2025–present)

Drey Matthew Jameson (born August 17, 1997) is an American professional baseball pitcher for the Arizona Diamondbacks of Major League Baseball (MLB).

Born and raised in Greenfield, Indiana, Jameson played two years of college baseball at Ball State University. The Diamondbacks selected him in the first round of the 2019 MLB draft and he played in their minor league system before making his MLB debut in 2022.

== Amateur career ==
Jameson attended Greenfield-Central High School in Greenfield, Indiana. In 2017, his senior year, he went 6–1 with a 0.65 ERA. He went unselected in the 2017 Major League Baseball draft and thus enrolled at Ball State University where he played college baseball for the Ball State Cardinals.

In 2018, Jameson's freshman season at Ball State, he went 7–2 with a 3.88 ERA over 18 games (12 starts). He was awarded Mid-American Conference (MAC) Freshman Pitcher of the Year. As a sophomore in 2019, he started 16 games and pitched to a 6–3 record with a 3.24 ERA and 146 strikeouts over 91 2/3 innings and was named the MAC Pitcher of the Year.

== Professional career ==
The Arizona Diamondbacks selected Jameson in the first round, with the 34th overall pick, of the 2019 Major League Baseball draft. He signed for $1.4 million and was assigned to the Hillsboro Hops of the Class A-Short Season Northwest League. Over 11 2/3 innings, he gave up eight earned runs, 14 hits, and nine walks, striking out 12. He did not play a minor league game in 2020 due to the cancellation of the minor league season caused by the COVID-19 pandemic. To begin the 2021 season, he returned to Hillsboro, now members of the High-A West. After starting 12 games and pitching to a 2–4 record with a 3.92 ERA and 77 strikeouts over 64 1/3 innings, he was promoted to the Amarillo Sod Poodles of the Double-A Central in late July. Over eight starts with Amarillo, Jameson went 3–2 with a 4.08 ERA and 68 strikeouts over 46 1/3 innings. Jameson returned to Amarillo to begin the 2022 season. After posting a 2.41 ERA over 18 2/3 innings, he was promoted to the Reno Aces of the Triple-A Pacific Coast League. Over 21 starts with Reno, Jameson went 5–12 with a 6.95 ERA and 109 strikeouts over 114 innings.

On September 15, 2022, the Diamondbacks selected Jameson's contract and promoted him to the major leagues. He made his MLB debut that night as Arizona's starting pitcher versus the San Diego Padres, earning the win after throwing seven scoreless innings in which he allowed no runs, one walk, and two hits in a 4–0 Diamondbacks win. He made a total of four starts for the Diamondbacks and had a 3–0 record, a 1.48 ERA and 24 strikeouts.

In 2023, Jameson was named to his first ever Opening Day roster. On April 24, he was optioned to Reno. He was recalled on May 27. Jameson posted a 3.32 ERA across 15 appearances (three starts) for the Diamondbacks before he was placed on the injured list with elbow inflammation on July 7, 2023. He was transferred to the 60-day injured list the following day. On September 17, it was announced that Jameson would undergo Tommy John surgery, ending his season and also ruling him out for the entirety of the 2024 season.

Jameson returned healthy in 2025 and pitched for the Diamondbacks in spring training. He was optioned to Reno to begin the season. He was recalled by the Diamondbacks on April 19 and optioned back to Reno on April 28. On May 20, Reno placed Jameson on the injured list with right elbow inflammation. He made two rehab appearances with the rookie-level Arizona Complex League Diamondbacks and was then subsequently transferred to the 60-day injured list with a bone fragment chip in the same elbow. For the season, Jameson pitched 12 2/3 innings in relief for Reno and went 0–1 with a 7.11 ERA, 19 strikeouts and eight walks. He pitched a total of three innings for the Diamondbacks in which he gave up one earned run and three walks. After the season, he played in the Arizona Fall League with the Salt River Rafters.

Jameson was optioned to Reno to open the 2026 season after pitching to a 8.44 ERA over five spring training appearances. He was recalled by the Diamondbacks on June 6. On July 21, the Diamondbacks played Jameson on the injured list with right hip inflammation. He completed a rehab assignment with Reno and was activated by the Diamondbacks on August 23. On August 27, the Diamondbacks optioned Jameson to Reno. Jameson made 12 relief appearances for Arizona in 2026 and had a 5.12 ERA and 13 strikeouts across 19 1/3 innings. With Reno, he appeared in 29 games and had a 2–2 record and a 7.67 ERA.
