= Pavin Smith =

American baseball player (born 1996)

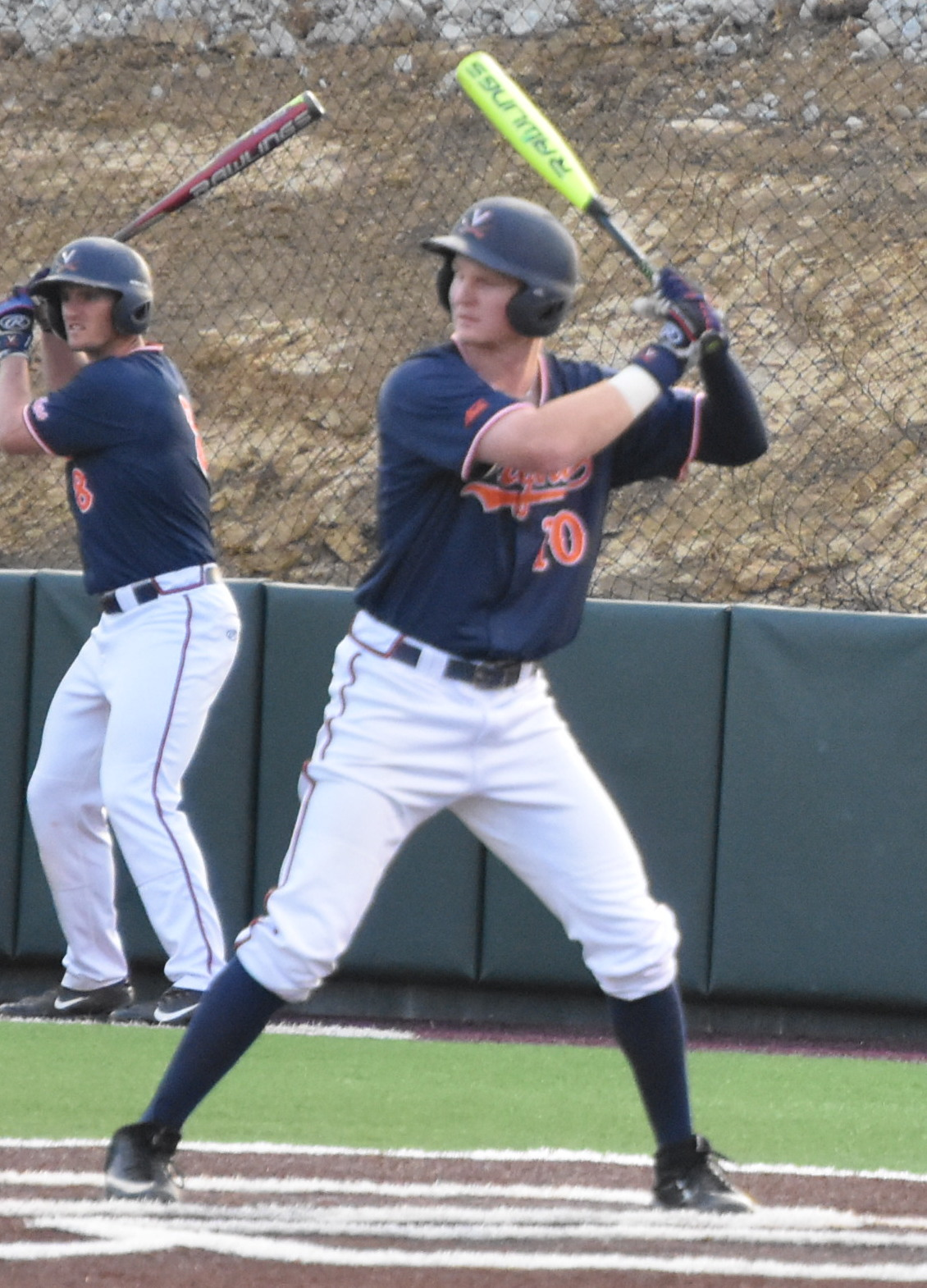
- Smith with the Virginia Cavaliers in 2017

Free agent
- First baseman / Right fielder
- Born: February 6, 1996 (age 30); Jupiter, Florida, U.S.
- Bats: Left Throws: Left

MLB debut
- September 12, 2020, for the Arizona Diamondbacks

MLB statistics (through 2026 season)
- Batting average: .242
- Home runs: 48
- Runs batted in: 192
- Stats at Baseball Reference

Teams
- Arizona Diamondbacks (2020–2026)

Pavin Joe Smith (born February 6, 1996) is an American professional baseball first baseman and right fielder who is a free agent. He played college baseball for the Virginia Cavaliers. The Arizona Diamondbacks selected Smith in the 2017 MLB draft and he made his Major League Baseball (MLB) debut in 2020.

== Amateur career ==
Pavin participated in the Babe Ruth League's 2008 Cal Ripken Major70 World Series. His two home runs in the World Championship helped his Jupiter, Florida team defeat Mexico, 5–4. Smith attended Palm Beach Gardens Community High School in Palm Beach Gardens, Florida. He was a first baseman and pitcher for the school's baseball team . As a pitcher, he had a 5–0 win–loss record with a 0.66 earned run average and 54 strikeouts in 32 innings pitched. The Colorado Rockies selected him in the 32nd round of the 2014 MLB draft, but he did not sign.

Smith enrolled at the University of Virginia to play college baseball for the Virginia Cavaliers. He played the 2015 season with an ulnar collateral ligament injury of the elbow, which prevented him from pitching. Smith had the game-winning hit in the second game of the 2015 College World Series against Vanderbilt. Smith underwent Tommy John surgery after Virginia won the College World Series, and he returned to play in 2016. He hit eight home runs as a sophomore. After the 2016 season, he played collegiate summer baseball for the Harwich Mariners of the Cape Cod Baseball League and was named a league all-star. In 2017, his junior year, Smith batted .342 with 13 home runs and 12 strikeouts.

== Professional career ==
The Arizona Diamondbacks selected Smith with the seventh overall selection of the 2017 MLB draft. Smith signed with the Diamondbacks, receiving a $5 million signing bonus.

Smith made his professional debut with the Hillsboro Hops of the Low-A Northwest League and spent the rest of 2017, posting a .318 batting average with 27 runs batted in (RBI) over 51 games. He was named a postseason All-Star. Smith played for the Visalia Rawhide of the High-A California League in 2018, where he hit .255 with 11 home runs and 54 RBI over 120 games. After the 2018 season, he played in the Arizona Fall League. Smith spent 2019 with the Jackson Generals of the Double-A Southern League. Over 123 games, he slashed .291/.370/.466 with 12 home runs and 67 RBI.

On September 10, 2020, the Diamondbacks selected Smith's contract to the 40-man and active roster. He made his major league debut on September 12 against the Seattle Mariners and notched his first hit off Yoshihisa Hirano. On September 25, Smith hit his first major league home run off A. J. Ramos of the Colorado Rockies.

Smith played in 145 games for the Diamondbacks in 2021, hitting .267/.328/.404 with career highs in home runs (11) and RBI (49). In 2022, Smith made 75 appearances for Arizona and hit .220/.300/.367 with nine home runs and 33 RBI. Smith was optioned to the Triple-A Reno Aces to begin the 2023 season. He returned to the Diamondbacks on April 9, after Kyle Lewis was placed on the injured list. In 69 games for Arizona, he hit .188/.317/.325 with seven home runs and 30 RBI.

Smith was again optioned to Triple-A Reno to begin the 2024 season. He hit three home runs against the Houston Astros on September 8.

Smith made 87 appearances for the Diamondbacks in 2025, batting .258/.362/.434 with eight home runs, 28 RBI, and two stolen bases. On August 29, he was placed on the injured list due to a strained left quadricep. He was transferred to the 60-day injured list on September 5, officially ending his season.

On March 30, 2026, the Diamondbacks placed Smith on the injured list due to left elbow inflammation. He was transferred to the 60-day injured list on April 14. Shortly thereafter, it was announced that Smith would be undergoing surgery to remove loose bodies from his injured elbow. He was activated from the IL on June 1. On July 9, after posting a slash line of .141/.236/.192, Smith was designated for assignment by the Diamondbacks. He cleared waivers and was sent outright to Reno on July 15. On September 12, the Diamondbacks added Smith back to their active roster. He hit a walk-off home run to beat the New York Yankees on September 19. On November 2, Smith was removed from the 40–man roster and sent outright to Reno, after which he elected free agency.

== Personal life ==
Smith's father is a sports agent who once had the golfer Corey Pavin as a client. Smith is named after the golfer. As a Christmas present in 2017, Smith paid off his parents' mortgage.

Smith is married to former University of Florida gymnast Amanda Cheney. They have one daughter.
