= Kevin Ginkel =

American baseball player (born 1994)

Free agent
- Pitcher
- Born: March 24, 1994 (age 32); San Diego, California, U.S.
- Bats: Left Throws: Right

MLB debut
- August 5, 2019, for the Arizona Diamondbacks

MLB statistics (through 2026 season)
- Win–loss record: 28–16
- Earned run average: 3.91
- Strikeouts: 355
- Stats at Baseball Reference

Teams
- Arizona Diamondbacks (2019–2026)

Kevin Andrew Ginkel (born March 24, 1994) is an American professional baseball pitcher who is a free agent. He has played in Major League Baseball (MLB) for the Arizona Diamondbacks. He made his MLB debut in 2019.

== Career ==
=== Amateur career ===
Ginkel attended El Capitan High School in Lakeside, California and played college baseball at Southwestern College and the University of Arizona. He was drafted by the San Francisco Giants in the 16th round of the 2014 Major League Baseball draft and the Boston Red Sox in the 26th round of the 2015 MLB draft, but did not sign either time and returned to school. In 2015, he played collegiate summer baseball with the Cotuit Kettleers of the Cape Cod Baseball League.

=== Professional career ===
Ginkel signed with the Arizona Diamondbacks after being drafted by them in the 22nd round of the 2016 MLB draft.

Ginkel made his professional debut with the Hillsboro Hops where he went 1–0 with a 2.61 ERA in 18 relief appearances. He played 2017 with Hillsboro and the Kane County Cougars, pitching to a combined 1–2 record and a 5.36 ERA in 40 1/3 relief innings, and 2018 with the Visalia Rawhide and Jackson Generals, going 6–1 with a 1.41 ERA in 54 appearances in relief. After the 2018 season, he played in the Arizona Fall League. He split the 2019 minor league season between the Arizona League Diamondbacks, Jackson, and the Reno Aces, and went a combined 2–2 with a 1.78 ERA over 34 innings.

On August 5, 2019, the Diamondbacks selected Ginkel's contract and promoted him to the major leagues. He made his debut that night versus the Philadelphia Phillies, pitching 2/3 of an inning and striking out one batter (J. T. Realmuto). Ginkel finished the 2019 season going 3–0 with a 1.48 ERA in 24 1/3 innings. In 2020, Ginkel recorded a 6.75 ERA with 18 strikeouts and 13 walks over 16 innings. Ginkel made 32 appearances for Arizona the following season, but struggled to a 6.35 ERA in 28 1/3 innings. He was removed from the 40-man roster and sent outright to Triple-A Reno following the season on November 19, 2021. Ginkel had his contract selected by the team on August 1, 2022. In 2022, he appeared in 30 games in his fourth season with the D-backs, posting a 3.38 ERA (11 earned runs across 29 1/3 innings) and 30 strikeouts.

In 2023, Ginkel achieved a 9–1 record with four saves, a 2.48 ERA, 0.98 WHIP, and 70 strikeouts over 60 games. He set career highs in multiple categories, including wins and strikeouts, and became the first Diamondbacks pitcher to go 9–0 in a season, surpassing Micah Owings' 8–0 record from 2011. Ginkel excelled both at home and on the road, and was particularly effective against both righties and lefties, with opponents batting just .162 against his slider. In the postseason, Ginkel served as the setup man and did not allow a run in 10 games, setting a franchise record with 10 consecutive scoreless outings to begin his postseason career, and earned his first postseason win in Game 4 of the 2023 NLCS against the Philadelphia Phillies. In Game 7, Ginkel came in the seventh inning to retire Trea Turner and Bryce Harper with the tying runs on base, then struck out the side in the eighth to help the Diamondbacks win their first pennant in 22 years.

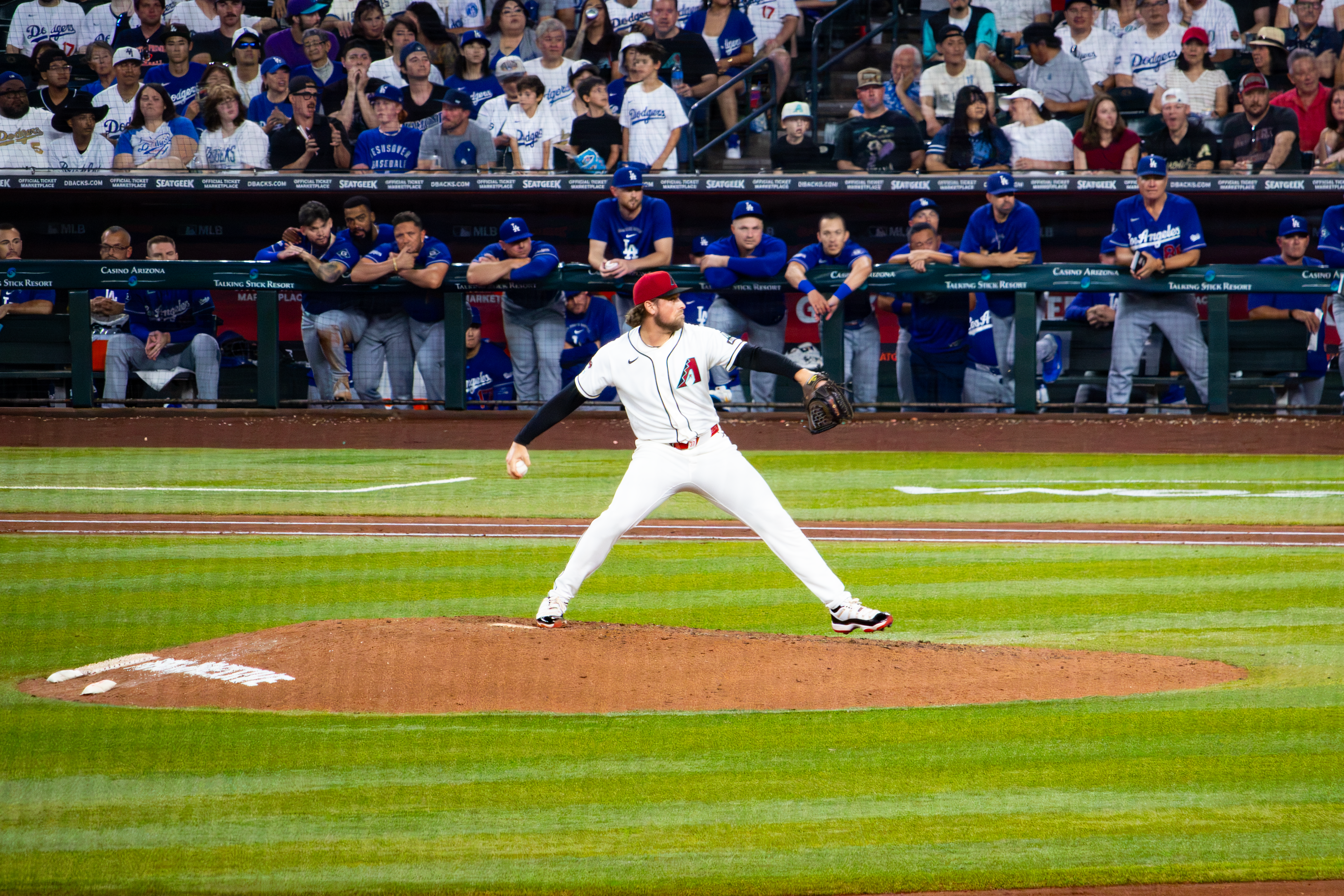
Ginkel pitching for the Diamondbacks at Chase Field in 2026

Ginkel pitched in 72 games for the Diamondbacks during the 2024 season, compiling an 8-3 record and 3.21 ERA with 77 strikeouts and five saves over 70 innings of work.

Ginkel made 29 appearances for the Diamondbacks during the 2025 campaign, but struggled to a 1-4 record and 7.36 ERA with 29 strikeouts and three saves across 25 2/3 innings pitched. On August 3, 2025, Ginkel was placed on the injured list due to a right shoulder sprain; he was transferred to the 60-day injured list three days later, ending his season.
