= Jordan Lawlar =

American baseball player (born 2002)

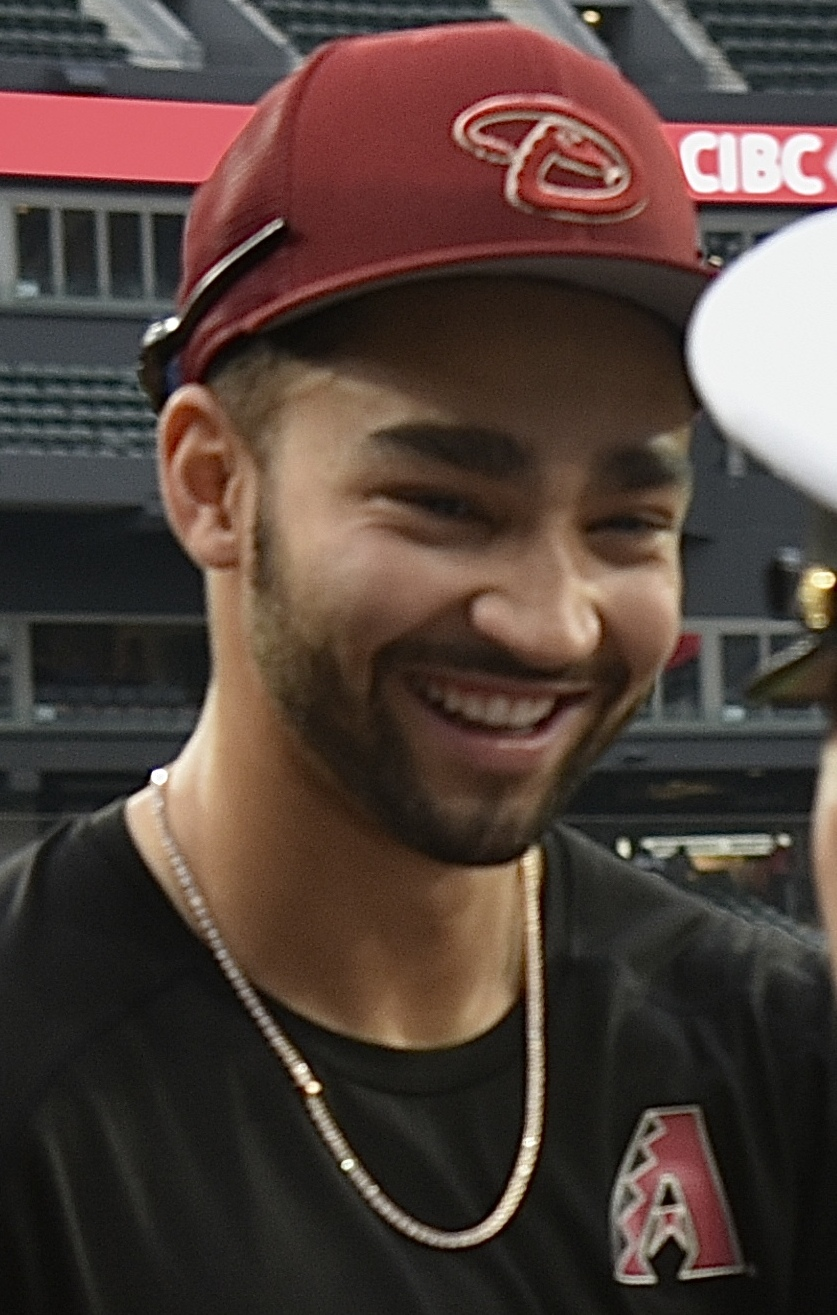
- Lawlar with the Arizona Diamondbacks in 2023

Arizona Diamondbacks – No. 10
- Outfielder
- Born: July 17, 2002 (age 24); Carrollton, Texas, U.S.
- Bats: Right Throws: Right

MLB debut
- September 7, 2023, for the Arizona Diamondbacks

MLB statistics (through 2026 season)
- Batting average: .217
- Home runs: 6
- Runs batted in: 21
- Stats at Baseball Reference

Teams
- Arizona Diamondbacks (2023, 2025–present)

Jordan Jeffrey-Joseph Lawlar (born July 17, 2002) is an American professional baseball outfielder for the Arizona Diamondbacks of Major League Baseball (MLB).

The Diamondbacks selected Lawlar with the sixth overall selection in the 2021 MLB draft. He made his MLB debut in 2023.

== Amateur career ==
Lawlar began playing baseball around age five. He attended Jesuit College Preparatory School of Dallas in Dallas, Texas. He began playing varsity as a sophomore in 2019. As a sophomore, he batted .409 with five home runs, and in 2020, his junior season, he hit .485 with one home run and 13 RBIs over 12 games before the season ended due to the COVID-19 pandemic. That summer, he played in the Perfect Game All-American Classic, and was named the Jackie Robinson Perfect Game Player of the Year. As a senior in 2021, he hit .412 with six home runs, 37 RBIs, and 32 stolen bases. He was subsequently named the Texas Gatorade Baseball Player of the Year. He committed to play college baseball at Vanderbilt University.

== Professional career ==
The Arizona Diamondbacks selected Lawlar in the first round, with the sixth overall selection, of the 2021 Major League Baseball draft. He signed for a bonus of $6.7 million. He made his professional debut with the Rookie-level Arizona Complex League Diamondbacks. After two games, it was announced that he had injured his left shoulder and would be undergoing season-ending surgery.

Lawlar was assigned to the Visalia Rawhide of the Low-A California League to begin the 2022 season. In late May, he was placed on the injured list with a back injury. He returned in mid-June. After batting .351 with nine home runs, 32 RBI, and 24 stolen bases over 44 games, he was promoted to the Hillsboro Hops of the High-A Northwest League in late July. He was selected to represent the Diamondbacks alongside Corbin Carroll at the 2022 All-Star Futures Game. Lawlar played in thirty games for Hillsboro in which he hit .288 with three home runs, 17 RBI, and 13 stolen bases before he was promoted to the Amarillo Sod Poodles of the Double-A Texas League. Over twenty games with Amarillo to finish the season, he batted .212 with four home runs and 11 RBI. He was selected to play in the Arizona Fall League for the Salt River Rafters after the season. While with the Rafters, Lawlar suffered a fractured left scapula after being hit by a wayward pitch from Baltimore Orioles prospect Nick Richmond, and was ruled out for six–to–eight weeks. Lawlar returned to Amarillo to open the 2023 season. In mid-August, he was promoted to the Reno Aces of the Triple-A Pacific Coast League.

On September 6, Lawlar selected to the 40-man roster and promoted to the major leagues for the first time. He made his MLB debut the next day as Arizona's starting shortstop. Lawlar recorded his first MLB hit, an infield single off Chicago Cubs starting pitcher Javier Assad, in his second at-bat. In 14 games during his rookie campaign, he batted .129/.206/.129 with no home runs or RBI.

Lawlar was optioned to Reno to begin the 2024 season. On March 27, 2024, it was announced that Lawlar would miss 8–10 weeks after undergoing thumb surgery. The injury stemmed from an incident in which he had suffered a ruptured ulnar collateral ligament of his thumb trying to pick up a ball during a spring training game. He ultimately played in 23 total games in 2024 for Reno, Amarillo, and the ACL Diamondbacks and hit .318 with two home runs. He did not appear in a game for the Diamondbacks. Following the 2024 season, Lawlar played winter league baseball for Tigres del Licey of the Dominican Professional Baseball League.

The Diamondbacks optioned Lawlar to Reno to begin the 2025 season. On May 12, the Diamondbacks recalled Lawlar. Lawlar played in a total of 28 games for the Diamondbacks and hit .182 with five RBI. With Reno, he appeared in 63 games and batted .313 with 11 home runs, 50 RBI, and 20 stolen bases. Following the 2025 season, Lawlar announced that he would return to play winter league baseball for the Tigres del Licey of the Dominican Professional Baseball League and that he would be playing center field.

Lawlar was named to Arizona's Opening Day roster as an outfielder for the 2026 season. On April 2, he hit his first career home run off Reynaldo López of the Atlanta Braves. However, the next day, Lawlar was ruled out for six-to-eight weeks after suffering a right wrist fracture. The Diamondbacks moved Lawlar to the 60-day injured list on April 7. He was activated on June 12. On June 20, Lawlar was placed back on the injured list with a hamstring strain. He was activated on August 17. Lawlar played in 44 games for the Diamondbacks and batted .258 with six home runs and 16 RBI.
