= Joe Mantiply =

American baseball player (born 1991)

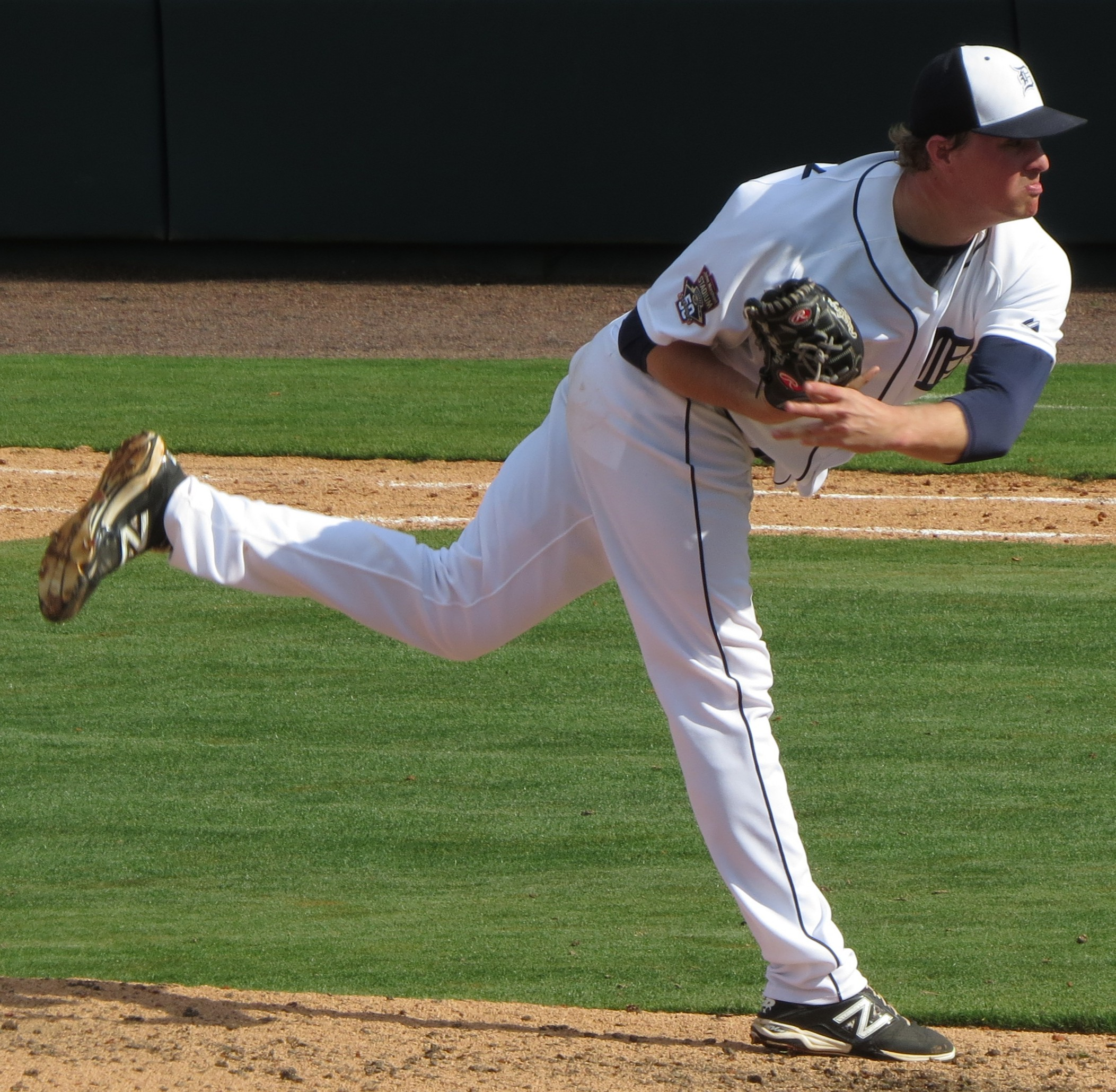
- Mantiply with the Detroit Tigers in 2015

Free agent
- Pitcher
- Born: March 1, 1991 (age 35); Danville, Virginia, U.S.
- Bats: Right Throws: Left

MLB debut
- September 3, 2016, for the Detroit Tigers

MLB statistics (through 2026 season)
- Win–loss record: 13–13
- Earned run average: 4.41
- Strikeouts: 216
- Stats at Baseball Reference

Teams
- Detroit Tigers (2016); New York Yankees (2019); Arizona Diamondbacks (2020–2025); Toronto Blue Jays (2026)

Career highlights and awards
- All-Star (2022)

Joseph Newman Mantiply (/ˈmæntɪplaɪ/ MAN-ti-ply; born March 1, 1991) is an American professional baseball pitcher who is a free agent. He has previously played in Major League Baseball MLB for the Detroit Tigers, New York Yankees, Arizona Diamondbacks, and Toronto Blue Jays. Mantiply was selected by the Tigers in the 27th round of the 2013 MLB draft. He was an All-Star in 2022.

== Career ==
=== Amateur ===
Mantiply attended Tunstall High School in Dry Fork, Virginia. The New York Mets selected him in the 48th round of the 2009 Major League Baseball (MLB) draft. He did not sign with the Mets and attended Virginia Tech to play college baseball for the Virginia Tech Hokies. In 2010, he played collegiate summer baseball with the Bethesda Big Train of the Cal Ripken Collegiate Baseball League. In 2011, he played summer baseball with the Harwich Mariners of the Cape Cod Baseball League. After his junior season, he was drafted by the Philadelphia Phillies in the 28th round of the 2012 MLB draft. He again did not sign and returned to Virginia Tech for his senior season.

=== Detroit Tigers ===
After his senior season, Mantiply was drafted by the Detroit Tigers in the 27th round (816th overall) of the 2013 MLB draft. He made his professional debut that season with the Connecticut Tigers. After starting his career as a starting pitcher, Mantiply became a relief pitcher in 2014. He started the season with the West Michigan Whitecaps and was later promoted to the Double-A Erie SeaWolves. Mantiply was called up and made his major league debut on September 3, 2016.

=== New York Yankees ===
On November 8, 2016, Mantiply was claimed off waivers by the New York Yankees. He was released on November 28 and signed a new minor league contract with the team on November 30. Mantiply spent the 2017 season with the Triple-A Scranton/Wilkes-Barre RailRiders, making 35 appearances and registering a 6–5 record and 2.83 ERA with 62 strikeouts across 70 innings pitched. He elected free agency following the season on November 6.

=== Cincinnati Reds ===
On November 13, 2017, Mantiply signed a minor league contract with the Cincinnati Reds. On March 9, 2018, Mantiply underwent Tommy John surgery, and was ruled out for entirety of the season.

On October 11, 2018, Mantiply re-signed with the team on a minor league contract. He began the 2019 season with the Triple-A Louisville Bats, recording a 3.72 ERA with 26 strikeouts and one saves in 18 games; Mantiply also made one appearance for the Double-A Chattanooga Lookouts, tallying the win.

=== New York Yankees (second stint) ===
On August 9, 2019, Mantiply was traded to the New York Yankees in exchange for cash considerations. On August 11, the Yankees selected Mantiply's contract. He made his season debut on August 12, against the Baltimore Orioles. He earned his first major league win after relieving Chad Green for three innings. On August 13, Mantiply was designated for assignment. He elected free agency following the season on November 4.

=== Arizona Diamondbacks ===
On January 20, 2020, Mantiply signed a minor league contract with the Arizona Diamondbacks organization. On September 1, the Diamondbacks selected Mantiply's contract to the active roster. He made four appearances for Arizona down the stretch, struggling to a 15.43 ERA with two strikeouts in 2 1/3 innings pitched. On September 28, Mantiply was designated for assignment by the Diamondbacks. He cleared waivers and was sent outright to the Triple-A Reno Aces on October 1. Mantiply re-signed with Arizona on a minor league contract on November 2.

On May 15, 2021, the Diamondbacks selected Mantiply's contract, adding him to their active roster. He made 57 relief appearances for Arizona, registering an 0–3 record and 3.40 ERA with 38 strikeouts across 39 2/3 innings pitched.

In 2022, Mantiply was named to the National League All-Star team as a reliever. It was his first All-Star selection. In 69 total appearances for the Diamondbacks, Mantiply compiled a 2–5 record and 2.85 ERA with 61 strikeouts and two saves over 60 innings of work.

Mantiply made 35 appearances (including three starts) for Arizona in 2023, posting a 2–2 record and 4.62 ERA with 28 strikeouts over 39 innings of work. He made 75 appearances for the Diamondbacks in 2024, pitching primarily out of the bullpen, compiling a 6-2 record and 3.92 ERA with 53 strikeouts and one save across 59 2/3 innings pitched.

Mantiply made 10 appearances for the Diamondbacks in 2025, but struggled to an 0–1 record and 15.83 ERA with eight strikeouts across 9 2/3 innings pitched. Mantiply was designated for assignment following the promotion of Jeff Brigham on May 30. He was released by the Diamondbacks on June 1.

=== Toronto Blue Jays ===
On July 13, 2025, Mantiply signed a minor league contract with the Toronto Blue Jays. He made 14 appearances for the Triple-A Buffalo Bisons, logging a 2-1 record and 3.45 ERA with 19 strikeouts across 15 2/3 innings pitched. Mantiply elected free agency following the season on November 6.

On March 3, 2026, Mantiply re-signed with the Blue Jays on a new minor league contract. On April 5, the Blue Jays selected Mantiply's contract from Buffalo, adding him to their active roster. On May 28, it was announced that Mantiply would require arthroscopic surgery to repair a left knee injury. He was activated from the injured list on September 1. He made 25 appearances for the team, logging a 2–0 record and 3.00 ERA with 22 strikeouts across 27 innings pitched. Mantiply was designated for assignment on September 21, and he elected free agency on September 28.
