= Bryce Jarvis =

American baseball player (born 1997)

Arizona Diamondbacks
- Pitcher
- Born: December 26, 1997 (age 28); Lexington, Kentucky, U.S.
- Bats: Left Throws: Right

MLB debut
- August 15, 2023, for the Arizona Diamondbacks

MLB statistics (through 2025 season)
- Win–loss record: 3–3
- Earned run average: 3.69
- Strikeouts: 71
- Stats at Baseball Reference

Teams
- Arizona Diamondbacks (2023–2025)

Bryce Martin Jarvis (born December 26, 1997) is an American professional baseball pitcher in the Arizona Diamondbacks organization. The Diamondbacks selected Jarvis in the first round of the 2020 MLB draft and he made his Major League Baseball (MLB) debut in 2023.

== Amateur career ==
Jarvis attended Brentwood Academy in Brentwood, Tennessee. As a junior in 2016, he pitched to a 5–0 win–loss record and a 2.33 earned run average (ERA), while batting .346. He earned all-state honors. In 2017, as a senior, he once again was awarded all-state honors alongside being named the 2017 Tennessee Baseball Player of the Year. He went unselected in the 2017 Major League Baseball draft and enrolled at Duke University where he played college baseball for the Duke Blue Devils.

As a freshman at Duke in 2018, Jarvis appeared in 25 games (five starts) in which he went 5–1 with a 2.45 ERA, striking out 67 batters over 47 2/3 innings. That summer, he played in the Cape Cod Baseball League for the Cotuit Kettleers. In 2019, his sophomore season, he went 5–2 with a 3.81 ERA over 19 games (11 starts) with 94 strikeouts over 75 2/3 innings. He was named the Most Valuable Player of the National Collegiate Athletic Association Morgantown Regional. He was selected by the New York Yankees in the 37th round of the 2019 Major League Baseball draft, but did not sign. As a junior in 2020, Jarvis threw the first perfect game in Duke history on February 21 against Cornell, striking out 15 batters in an 8–0 win. He compiled a 3–1 record with a 0.67 ERA over four starts, striking out forty over 27 innings, before the college baseball season was cut short due to the COVID-19 pandemic.

== Professional career ==
The Arizona Diamondbacks selected Jarvis in the first round, with the 18th overall selection, in the 2020 Major League Baseball draft. He signed with the Diamondbacks on June 25 for a bonus of $2.65 million. He did not play a minor league game in 2020 due to the cancellation of the minor league season caused by the pandemic.

To begin the 2021 season, Jarvis was assigned to the Hillsboro Hops of the High-A West to make his professional debut. After pitching 37 1/3 innings and going 1–2 with a 3.62 ERA and 42 strikeouts over seven starts, he was promoted to the Amarillo Sod Poodles of the Double-A Central on June 21. With Amarillo, he missed over a month due to an oblique injury. Over eight starts with Amarillo, Jarvis went 1–2 with a 5.66 ERA and forty strikeouts over 35 innings. He returned to Amarillo for the 2022 season. Over 25 starts, Jarvis went 3–6 with an 8.27 ERA, 60 walks, and 110 strikeouts over 106 2/3 innings. To open the 2023 season, Jarvis was assigned back to Amarillo. In 25 games (19 starts) split between Amarillo and the Triple–A Reno Aces, he registered a cumulative 9–6 record and 5.26 ERA with 110 strikeouts in 102 2/3 innings pitched.

On August 13, 2023, Jarvis was selected to the 40-man roster and promoted to the major leagues for the first time. He made his MLB debut on August 15 against the Colorado Rockies and pitched three innings in relief in which he gave up one run on one hit, one walk, and three strikeouts. Across 11 appearances during his rookie campaign, he compiled a 3.04 ERA with 12 strikeouts across 23 2/3 innings pitched.

Jarvis was named to his first Opening Day roster to start the 2024 season. He played the entirety of the season with the Diamondbacks and recorded a 3.19 ERA with 38 strikeouts across 59 1/3 innings pitched. On August 2, 2024, manager Torey Lovullo announced that Jarvis would likely miss the remainder of the season with a sprained right elbow. He was placed on the 60–day injured list on August 6, ending his season officially.

Jarvis returned to the Arizona bullpen to start the 2025 season. He was optioned to Reno for the first time on April 19, and was subsequently optioned and recalled multiple times during the year. He made 12 appearances for the Diamondbacks during the 2025 season and pitched to a 5.73 ERA with 21 strikeouts and one save over 22 innings of work. On December 12, 2025, Jarvis was designated for assignment following the signing of Michael Soroka. He cleared waivers and was sent outright to Reno on December 19.

Jarvis was assigned to Reno for the 2026 season. He appeared in 52 games and had a 2–4 record with a 5.51 ERA and 67 strikeouts over 67 innings.

== Personal life ==
Jarvis was born to Kevin and Elizabeth Jarvis, and also has a younger sister named Kennedy. His father was a pitcher who played collegiately at Wake Forest and played 13 years in Major League Baseball.
