= 2022 Arizona Diamondbacks season =

2022 Arizona Diamondbacks
- League: National League
- Division: West
- Ballpark: Chase Field
- City: Phoenix, Arizona
- Record: 74–88 (.457)
- Divisional place: 4th
- Owners: Ken Kendrick
- General managers: Mike Hazen
- Managers: Torey Lovullo
- Television: Bally Sports Arizona (Steve Berthiaume, Bob Brenly, Greg Schulte)
- Radio: KMVP-FM (98.7) (Greg Schulte, Tom Candiotti, Mike Ferrin); KHOV-FM (105.1, Spanish)
- Stats: ESPN.com; Baseball Reference

The 2022 Arizona Diamondbacks season was the franchise's 25th season in Major League Baseball and their 25th season at Chase Field in Phoenix, Arizona as members of the National League West. They were managed by Torey Lovullo in his sixth season with the franchise.

On December 2, 2021, Commissioner of Baseball Rob Manfred announced a lockout of players, following expiration of the collective bargaining agreement (CBA) between the league and the Major League Baseball Players Association (MLBPA). On March 10, 2022, MLB and the MLBPA agreed to a new collective bargaining agreement, thus ending the lockout. Opening Day was played on April 7. Although MLB previously announced that several series would be cancelled due to the lockout, the agreement provides for a 162-game season, with originally canceled games to be made up via doubleheaders.

The team finished fourth in the National League West with a 74–88 record and missed the postseason.

== Offseason ==
=== Lockout ===
The expiration of the league's collective bargaining agreement (CBA) with the Major League Baseball Players Association occurred on December 1, 2021, with no new agreement in place. As a result, the team owners voted unanimously to lockout the players stopping all free agency and trades.

The parties came to an agreement on a new CBA on March 10, 2022.

=== Rule changes ===
Pursuant to the new CBA, several new rules were instituted for the 2022 season. The National League will adopt the designated hitter full-time, a draft lottery will be implemented, the postseason will expand from ten teams to twelve, and advertising patches will appear on player uniforms and helmets for the first time.

== Roster ==
2022 Arizona Diamondbacks
Roster
Pitchers: 40 Madison Bumgarner; 54 Humberto Castellanos; 27 Zach Davies; 32 Chris Devenski; 65 Luis Frías; 43 Paul Fry; 23 Zac Gallen; 49 Tyler Gilbert; 37 Kevin Ginkel; 47 Tommy Henry; 67 Tyler Holton; 58 Drey Jameson; 29 Merrill Kelly; 31 Ian Kennedy; 60 Dallas Keuchel; 35 Joe Mantiply; 25 Corbin Martin; 34 Mark Melancon; 99 Keynan Middleton; 59 Reyes Moronta; 50 Kyle Nelson; 52 Ryne Nelson; 47 Matt Peacock; 59 Óliver Pérez; 64 Sean Poppen; 24 Noé Ramirez; 22 Caleb Smith; 66 Edwin Uceta; 7 Luke Weaver; 48 J. B. Wendelken; 57 Taylor Widener	Catchers: 14 Grayson Greiner; 36 José Herrera; 18 Carson Kelly; Infielders: 13 Nick Ahmed; 43 Sergio Alcántara; 28 Seth Beer; 14 Matt Davidson; 1 Wilmer Difo; 15 Drew Ellis; 16 Jake Hager; 19 Yonny Hernández; 45 Buddy Kennedy; 4 Ketel Marte; 2 Geraldo Perdomo; 15 Emmanuel Rivera; 10 Josh Rojas; 8 Ildemaro Vargas; 53 Christian Walker	Outfielders: 7 Corbin Carroll; 46 Stone Garrett; 21 Cooper Hummel; 8 Jordan Luplow; 30 Jake McCarthy; 6 David Peralta; 26 Pavin Smith; 5 Alek Thomas; 12 Daulton Varsho	Manager: 17 Torey Lovullo; Coaches: 82 Jeff Banister (bench); 76 Dan Carlson (assistant pitching); 75 Damion Easley (assistant hitting); 77 Barry Enright (assistant pitching); 71 Mike Fetters (bullpen); 78 Drew Hedman (assistant hitting); 74 Joe Mather (hitting); 39 Dave McKay (first base); 69 Sharif Othman (bullpen catcher); 3 Tony Perezchica (third base); 83 Jose Queliz (bullpen catcher); 73 Rick Short (assistant hitting); 72 Brent Strom (pitching); 70 Luis Urueta (director of player development)

== Season standings ==
=== National League West ===
NL West
Team	W	L	Pct.	GB	Home	Road
Los Angeles Dodgers	111	51	.685	—	57‍–‍24	54‍–‍27
San Diego Padres	89	73	.549	22	44‍–‍37	45‍–‍36
San Francisco Giants	81	81	.500	30	44‍–‍37	37‍–‍44
Arizona Diamondbacks	74	88	.457	37	40‍–‍41	34‍–‍47
Colorado Rockies	68	94	.420	43	41‍–‍40	27‍–‍54

=== National League Wild Card ===
Division leaders
Team	W	L	Pct.
Los Angeles Dodgers	111	51	.685
Atlanta Braves	101	61	.623
St. Louis Cardinals	93	69	.574

Wild Card teams (Top 3 teams qualify for postseason)
Team	W	L	Pct.	GB
New York Mets	101	61	.623	+14
San Diego Padres	89	73	.549	+2
Philadelphia Phillies	87	75	.537	—
Milwaukee Brewers	86	76	.531	1
San Francisco Giants	81	81	.500	6
Arizona Diamondbacks	74	88	.457	13
Chicago Cubs	74	88	.457	13
Miami Marlins	69	93	.426	18
Colorado Rockies	68	94	.420	19
Pittsburgh Pirates	62	100	.383	25
Cincinnati Reds	62	100	.383	25
Washington Nationals	55	107	.340	32

=== Record vs. opponents ===
2022 National League record Source: MLB Standings Grid – 2022
Team	AZ	ATL	CHC	CIN	COL	LAD	MIA	MIL	NYM	PHI	PIT	SD	SF	STL	WSH	AL
Arizona	—	2–4	4–3	3–4	9–10	5–14	5–1	4–3	2–4	3–3	4–3	5–14	10–9	2–5	4–3	12–8
Atlanta	4–2	—	3–3	4–3	6–1	2–4	13–6	3–3	10–9	11–8	7–0	3–4	4–3	4–3	14–5	13–7
Chicago	3–4	3–3	—	11–8	3–4	0–7	4–2	10–9	4–3	6–0	10–9	2–5	2–5	6–13	4–2	6–14
Cincinnati	4–3	3–4	8–11	—	2–4	0–7	4–3	6–13	1–5	1–6	7–12	0–6	4–2	7–12	3–4	12–8
Colorado	10–9	1–6	4–3	4–2	—	8–11	2–4	3–4	2–5	2–5	3–3	10–9	5–14	2–4	3–4	9–11
Los Angeles	14–5	4–2	7–0	7–0	11–8	—	6–1	4–3	3–4	3–4	1–5	14–5	15–4	4–2	3–3	15–5
Miami	1–5	6–13	2–4	3–4	4–2	1–6	—	4–3	6–13	7–12	4–3	3–4	3–4	2–4	15–4	8–12
Milwaukee	3–4	3–3	9–10	13–6	4–3	3–4	3–4	—	2–4	2–4	11–8	3–4	3–4	9–10	3–3	15–5
New York	4–2	9–10	3–4	5–1	5–2	4–3	13–6	4–2	—	14–5	6–1	2–4	4–3	5–2	14–5	9–11
Philadelphia	3–3	8–11	0–6	6–1	5–2	4–3	12–7	4–2	5–14	—	6–1	4–3	1–5	4–3	16–3	9–11
Pittsburgh	3–4	0–7	9–10	12–7	3–3	5–1	3–4	8–11	1–6	1–6	—	2–4	1–5	6–13	4–3	4–16
San Diego	14–5	4–3	5–2	6–0	9–10	5–14	4–3	4–3	4–2	3–4	4–2	—	13–6	2–4	4–3	8–12
San Francisco	9–10	3–4	5–2	2–4	14–5	4–15	4–3	4–3	3–4	5–1	5–1	6–13	—	3–4	4–2	10–10
St. Louis	5–2	3–4	13–6	12–7	4–2	2–4	4–2	10–9	2–5	3–4	13–6	4–2	4–3	—	4–3	10–10
Washington	3–4	5–14	2–4	4–3	4–3	3–3	4–15	3–3	5–14	3–16	3–4	3–4	2–4	3–4	—	8–12

Updated with the results of all games through October 5, 2022.

== Regular season ==
=== Game log ===
2022 Game Log: 74–88 (Home: 40–41; Away: 34–47)
April: 10–12 (Home: 5–7; Away: 5–5)

#	Date	Opponent	Score	Win	Loss	Save	Stadium	Attendance	Record	Streak
1	April 7	Padres	4–2	**Mantiply** (1–0)	Suárez (0–1)	—	**Chase Field**	35,508	1–0	W1
2	April 8	Padres	0–3	Manaea (1–0)	**Pérez** (0–1)	Rogers (1)	**Chase Field**	17,297	1–1	L1
3	April 9	Padres	2–5	Wilson (1–0)	**Kennedy** (0–1)	Rogers (2)	**Chase Field**	19,504	1–2	L2
4	April 10	Padres	5–10	Adams (1–0)	**Smith** (0–1)	—	**Chase Field**	19,089	1–3	L3
5	April 12	Astros	1–2	Neris (1–0)	**Melancon** (0–1)	Pressly (3)	**Chase Field**	17,674	1–4	L4
6	April 13	Astros	3–2 (10)	**Pérez** (1–1)	Pressly (0–1)	—	**Chase Field**	12,660	2–4	W1
7	April 15	@ Mets	3–10	Bassitt (2–0)	**Davies** (0–1)	—	Citi Field	43,820	2–5	L1
8	April 16	@ Mets	3–2	**Poppen** (1–0)	Rodríguez (0–1)	**Melancon** (1)	Citi Field	37,935	3–5	W1
9	April 17	@ Mets	0–5	Shreve (1–0)	**Ramirez** (0–1)	—	Citi Field	24,515	3–6	L1
—	April 18	@ Nationals	Postponed (rain); Makeup April 19							
10	April 19 (1)	@ Nationals	1–6	Gray (2–1)	**Bumgarner** (0–1)	—	Nationals Park	9,261	3–7	L2
11	April 19 (2)	@ Nationals	0–1	Adon (1–2)	**Gilbert** (0–1)	Rainey (3)	Nationals Park	11,720	3–8	L3
12	April 20	@ Nationals	11–2	**Kelly** (1–0)	Fedde (1–1)	—	Nationals Park	15,774	4–8	W1
13	April 21	@ Nationals	4–3	**Davies** (1–1)	Rogers (1–2)	**Melancon** (2)	Nationals Park	14,424	5–8	W2
14	April 22	Mets	5–6 (10)	Díaz (1–0)	**Melancon** (0–2)	Lugo (1)	**Chase Field**	20,939	5–9	L1
15	April 23	Mets	5–2	**Castellanos** (1–0)	Williams (0–1)	**Mantiply** (1)	**Chase Field**	25,413	6–9	W1
16	April 24	Mets	2–6	Megill (3–0)	**Wendelken** (0–1)	—	**Chase Field**	23,570	6–10	L1
17	April 25	Dodgers	0–4	Buehler (2–1)	**Kelly** (1–1)	—	**Chase Field**	17,750	6–11	L2
18	April 26	Dodgers	5–3	**Kennedy** (1–1)	Graterol (0–1)	**Melancon** (3)	**Chase Field**	18,063	7–11	W1
19	April 27	Dodgers	3–1	**Kennedy** (2–1)	Hudson (1–1)	**Melancon** (4)	**Chase Field**	15,138	8–11	W2
20	April 28	@ Cardinals	3–8	Hudson (2–1)	**Castellanos** (1–1)	—	Busch Stadium	33,464	8–12	L1
21	April 29	@ Cardinals	6–2	**Bumgarner** (1–1)	Wainwright (2–3)	—	Busch Stadium	40,753	9–12	W1
22	April 30	@ Cardinals	2–0	**Kelly** (2–1)	Mikolas (1–1)	**Kennedy** (1)	Busch Stadium	40,144	10–12	W2

May: 15–14 (Home: 9–8; Away: 6–6)

#	Date	Opponent	Score	Win	Loss	Save	Stadium	Attendance	Record	Streak
23	May 1	@ Cardinals	5–7	Whitley (2–0)	**Middleton** (0–1)	Helsley (1)	Busch Stadium	45,123	10–13	L1
24	May 2	@ Marlins	5–4	**Gallen** (1–0)	López (3–1)	**Kennedy** (2)	LoanDepot Park	6,224	11–13	W1
25	May 3	@ Marlins	5–4	**Castellanos** (2–1)	Rogers (1–4)	**Mantiply** (2)	LoanDepot Park	6,263	12–13	W2
26	May 4	@ Marlins	8–7	**Middleton** (1–1)	Bender (0–3)	**Kennedy** (3)	LoanDepot Park	7,356	13–13	W3
27	May 6	Rockies	4–1	**Kelly** (3–1)	Estévez (1–1)	**Melancon** (5)	**Chase Field**	18,551	14–13	W4
28	May 7	Rockies	1–4	Colomé (1–0)	**Melancon** (0–3)	Bard (9)	**Chase Field**	24,133	14–14	L1
29	May 8	Rockies	4–0	**Gallen** (2–0)	Márquez (0–3)	—	**Chase Field**	19,323	15–14	W1
30	May 9	Marlins	4–3	**K. Nelson** (1–0)	Hernández (2–2)	**Melancon** (6)	**Chase Field**	11,571	16–14	W2
31	May 10	Marlins	9–3	**Bumgarner** (2–1)	Luzardo (2–3)	—	**Chase Field**	8,855	17–14	W3
32	May 11	Marlins	3–11	Bass (1–1)	**Melancon** (0–4)	—	**Chase Field**	9,058	17–15	L1
33	May 13	Cubs	4–3	**Davies** (2–1)	Smyly (1–4)	**Melancon** (7)	**Chase Field**	21,765	18–15	W1
34	May 14	Cubs	2–4	Givens (3–0)	**Melancon** (0–5)	Wick (3)	**Chase Field**	25,169	18–16	L1
35	May 15	Cubs	2–3	Effross (1–1)	**Kennedy** (2–2)	Wick (4)	**Chase Field**	23,309	18–17	L2
36	May 16	@ Dodgers	4–5	Gonsolin (4–0)	**Bumgarner** (2–2)	Kimbrel (6)	Dodger Stadium	42,650	18–18	L3
37	May 17 (1)	@ Dodgers	6–7	Bruihl (1–1)	**Gilbert** (0–2)	Kimbrel (7)	Dodger Stadium	42,089	18–19	L4
38	May 17 (2)	@ Dodgers	3–12	Anderson (4–0)	**Kelly** (3–2)	—	Dodger Stadium	46,850	18–20	L5
39	May 18	@ Dodgers	3–5	Buehler (5–1)	**Davies** (2–2)	Hudson (2)	Dodger Stadium	35,643	18–21	L6
40	May 19	@ Cubs	3–1	**Gallen** (3–0)	Stroman (1–4)	**Melancon** (8)	Wrigley Field	32,631	19–21	W1
41	May 20	@ Cubs	10–6	**Castellanos** (3–1)	Hendricks (2–4)	—	Wrigley Field	31,235	20–21	W2
42	May 21	@ Cubs	7–6 (10)	**Kennedy** (3–2)	Wick (1–1)	**Melancon** (9)	Wrigley Field	32,269	21–21	W3
43	May 22	@ Cubs	4–5	Thompson (4–0)	**Kennedy** (3–3)	—	Wrigley Field	32,606	21–22	L1
44	May 23	Royals	9–5	**Wendelken** (1–1)	Greinke (0–3)	—	**Chase Field**	14,629	22–22	W1
45	May 24	Royals	8–6	**Mantiply** (2–0)	Clarke (1–1)	**Melancon** (10)	**Chase Field**	12,616	23–22	W2
46	May 26	Dodgers	1–14	Bruihl (1–1)	**Castellanos** (3–2)	—	**Chase Field**	17,057	23–23	L1
47	May 27	Dodgers	4–6	Graterol (1–2)	**Bumgarner** (2–3)	—	**Chase Field**	24,865	23–24	L2
48	May 28	Dodgers	2–3	Gonsolin (5–0)	**Kelly** (3–3)	Hudson (3)	**Chase Field**	30,819	23–25	L3
49	May 29	Dodgers	1–3	Anderson (6–0)	**Davies** (2–3)	Kimbrel (10)	**Chase Field**	30,482	23–26	L4
50	May 30	Braves	6–2	**Gallen** (4–0)	Strider (1–2)	—	**Chase Field**	20,735	24–26	W1
51	May 31	Braves	8–7 (10)	**Melancon** (1–5)	Stephens (1–2)	—	**Chase Field**	12,686	25–26	W2

June: 9–16 (Home: 5–7; Away: 4–9)

#	Date	Opponent	Score	Win	Loss	Save	Stadium	Attendance	Record	Streak
52	June 1	Braves	0–6	Wright (5–3)	**Bumgarner** (2–4)	—	**Chase Field**	12,370	25–27	L1
53	June 3	@ Pirates	8–6	**Kelly** (4–3)	Brubaker (0–5)	**Melancon** (11)	PNC Park	16,444	26–27	W1
54	June 4	@ Pirates	1–2	Stratton (3–2)	**Melancon** (1–6)	—	PNC Park	19,149	26–28	L1
55	June 5	@ Pirates	0–3	Thompson (3–4)	**Gallen** (4–1)	Bednar (10)	PNC Park	11,796	26–29	L2
56	June 6	@ Reds	0–7 (7)	Greene (3–7)	**Bumgarner** (2–5)	—	Great American Ball Park	9,485	26–30	L3
57	June 7	@ Reds	8–14	Ashcraft (3–0)	**Gilbert** (0–3)	—	Great American Ball Park	11,512	26–31	L4
58	June 8	@ Reds	7–0	**Kelly** (5–3)	Minor (0–2)	—	Great American Ball Park	11,957	27–31	W1
59	June 9	@ Reds	5–4	**Melancon** (2–6)	Santillan (0–1)	**Kennedy** (4)	Great American Ball Park	13,167	28–31	W2
60	June 10	@ Phillies	5–7	Gibson (4–2)	**Gallen** (4–2)	Knebel (11)	Citizens Bank Park	37,423	28–32	L1
61	June 11	@ Phillies	0–4	Wheeler (5–3)	**Bumgarner** (2–6)	—	Citizens Bank Park	30,820	28–33	L2
62	June 12	@ Phillies	13–1	**Weaver** (1–0)	Suárez (4–4)	—	Citizens Bank Park	41,218	29–33	W1
63	June 13	Reds	4–5	Minor (1–2)	**Kelly** (5–4)	Strickland (2)	**Chase Field**	13,735	29–34	L1
64	June 14	Reds	3–5 (12)	Cessa (3–1)	**Poppen** (1–1)	Kuhnel (1)	**Chase Field**	15,081	29–35	L2
65	June 15	Reds	7–4	**Ramirez** (2–1)	Warren (2–3)	—	**Chase Field**	14,917	30–35	W1
66	June 17	Twins	7–2	**Bumgarner** (3–6)	Smeltzer (3–1)	—	**Chase Field**	26,351	31–35	W2
67	June 18	Twins	1–11	Bundy (4–3)	**Weaver** (1–1)	—	**Chase Field**	24,338	31–36	L1
68	June 19	Twins	7–1	**Kelly** (6–4)	Archer (1–3)	—	**Chase Field**	30,690	32–36	W1
69	June 20	@ Padres	1–4	Darvish (7–3)	**Davies** (2–4)	Rogers (21)	Petco Park	35,430	32–37	L1
70	June 21	@ Padres	2–3 (11)	Hill (2–0)	**Kennedy** (3–4)	—	Petco Park	31,528	32–38	L2
71	June 22	@ Padres	4–10	Morejón (1–0)	**Bumgarner** (3–7)	Martinez (1)	Petco Park	31,024	32–39	L3
72	June 24	Tigers	1–5	García (2–2)	**Kelly** (6–5)	—	**Chase Field**	22,064	32–40	L4
73	June 25	Tigers	3–6	Alexander (1–3)	**Mantiply** (1–1)	Soto (14)	**Chase Field**	23,129	32–41	L5
74	June 26	Tigers	11–7	**Wendelken** (2–1)	Vest (1–2)	—	**Chase Field**	22,529	33–41	W1
75	June 28	Padres	7–6	**Melancon** (3–6)	Rogers (0–4)	—	**Chase Field**	19,904	34–41	W2
76	June 29	Padres	0–4	Clevinger (2–0)	**Bumgarner** (3–8)	Martinez (2)	**Chase Field**	20,109	34–42	L1

July: 11–14 (Home: 8–5; Away: 3–9)

#	Date	Opponent	Score	Win	Loss	Save	Stadium	Attendance	Record	Streak
77	July 1	@ Rockies	9–3	**Kelly** (7–5)	Senzatela (3–5)	—	Coors Field	47,588	35–42	W1
78	July 2	@ Rockies	7–11	Gomber (4–7)	**Keuchel** (2–6)	—	Coors Field	48,331	35–43	L1
79	July 3	@ Rockies	5–6	Bird (1–0)	**Ramirez** (2–2)	Bard (16)	Coors Field	33,479	35–44	L2
80	July 4	Giants	8–3	**Bumgarner** (4–8)	Rodón (7–5)	—	**Chase Field**	27,752	36–44	W1
81	July 5	Giants	6–2	**Smith** (1–1)	Leone (3–1)	—	**Chase Field**	14,467	37–44	W2
82	July 6	Giants	5–7	Brebbia (4–1)	**Mantiply** (1–2)	Long (1)	**Chase Field**	13,445	37–45	L1
83	July 7	Rockies	3–4	Estévez (2–4)	**Melancon** (3–7)	Bard (17)	**Chase Field**	11,727	37–46	L2
84	July 8	Rockies	5–6	Kuhl (6–5)	**Poppen** (1–2)	Colomé (4)	**Chase Field**	15,524	37–47	L3
85	July 9	Rockies	9–2	**Bumgarner** (5–8)	Freeland (4–7)	—	**Chase Field**	21,819	38–47	W1
86	July 10	Rockies	2–3	Márquez (5–7)	**Middleton** (1–2)	Bard (18)	**Chase Field**	18,126	38–48	L1
87	July 11	@ Giants	4–3	**Kelly** (8–5)	Cobb (3–4)	**Melancon** (12)	Oracle Park	25,325	39–48	W1
88	July 12	@ Giants	0–13	Webb (8–3)	**Keuchel** (2–7)	—	Oracle Park	23,353	39–49	L1
89	July 13	@ Giants	3–4	Doval (3–4)	**Melancon** (3–8)	—	Oracle Park	27,055	39–50	L2
90	July 15	@ Padres	3–5	Darvish (8–4)	**Bumgarner** (5–9)	Rogers (25)	Petco Park	41,302	39–51	L3
91	July 16	@ Padres	3–4	Manaea (5–4)	**Ramirez** (2–3)	Rogers (26)	Petco Park	42,384	39–52	L4
92	July 17	@ Padres	3–1	**Kelly** (9–5)	Clevinger (2–3)	**Melancon** (13)	Petco Park	36,428	40–52	W1
–	July 19	**92nd All-Star Game in Los Angeles, CA**								
93	July 22	Nationals	10–1	**Gallen** (5–2)	Corbin (4–13)	—	**Chase Field**	17,819	41–52	W2
94	July 23	Nationals	7–2	**Bumgarner** (6–9)	Sánchez (0–2)	—	**Chase Field**	37,802	42–52	W3
95	July 24	Nationals	3–4	Edwards Jr. (3–3)	**Mantiply** (1–3)	Finnegan (2)	**Chase Field**	20,278	42–53	L1
96	July 25	Giants	7–0	**Kelly** (10–5)	Junis (4–2)	—	**Chase Field**	16,100	43–53	W1
97	July 26	Giants	7–3	**Kennedy** (4–4)	Rodón (8–6)	—	**Chase Field**	16,989	44–53	W2
98	July 27	Giants	5–3	**Ramirez** (3–3)	Webb (9–4)	**Melancon** (14)	**Chase Field**	17,043	45–53	W3
99	July 29	@ Braves	2–5	Wright (13–4)	**Bumgarner** (6–10)	Jansen (24)	Truist Park	41,536	45–54	L1
100	July 30	@ Braves	2–6	Anderson (9–6)	**Martin** (0–1)	—	Truist Park	41,682	45–55	L2
101	July 31	@ Braves	0–1	Jansen (5–0)	**Melancon** (3–9)	—	Truist Park	39,005	45–56	L3

August: 16–12 (Home: 7–6; Away: 9–6)

#	Date	Opponent	Score	Win	Loss	Save	Stadium	Attendance	Record	Streak
102	August 1	@ Guardians	5–6 (11)	Hentges (3–2)	**Melancon** (3–10)	—	Progressive Field	13,707	45–57	L4
103	August 2	@ Guardians	6–3	**Gallen** (6–2)	McKenzie (7–8)	**Kennedy** (5)	Progressive Field	14,471	46–57	W1
104	August 3	@ Guardians	4–7	Bieber (6–6)	**Henry** (0–1)	—	Progressive Field	18,642	46–58	L1
105	August 5	Rockies	6–5	**Devenski** (1–0)	Colomé (2–5)	**Kennedy** (6)	**Chase Field**	17,720	47–58	W1
106	August 6	Rockies	2–3	Estévez (3–4)	**Kennedy** (4–5)	Bard (23)	**Chase Field**	21,146	47–59	L1
107	August 7	Rockies	6–4	**Devenski** (2–0)	Colomé (2–6)	**Melancon** (15)	**Chase Field**	20,644	48–59	W1
108	August 8	Pirates	3–0	**Gallen** (7–2)	Bañuelos (0–1)	**Kennedy** (7)	**Chase Field**	11,275	49–59	W2
109	August 9	Pirates	6–4	**Henry** (1–1)	Thompson (3–9)	**Melancon** (16)	**Chase Field**	12,901	50–59	W3
110	August 10	Pirates	4–6	Keller (4–8)	**Bumgarner** (6–11)	Stout (1)	**Chase Field**	12,714	50–60	L1
111	August 11	Pirates	9–3	**Ginkel** (1–0)	De Jong (4–1)	—	**Chase Field**	12,725	51–60	W1
112	August 12	@ Rockies	3–5	Lamet (1–1)	**Devenski** (2–1)	Estévez (2)	Coors Field	32,055	51–61	L1
113	August 13	@ Rockies	6–0	**Gallen** (8–2)	Ureña (1–4)	—	Coors Field	35,233	52–61	W1
114	August 14	@ Rockies	7–4	**Henry** (2–1)	Feltner (2–4)	**Kennedy** (8)	Coors Field	32,442	53–61	W2
115	August 15	@ Giants	1–6	Cobb (4–6)	**Bumgarner** (6–12)	—	Oracle Park	20,694	53–62	L1
116	August 16	@ Giants	1–2	Brebbia (6–1)	**Kennedy** (4–8)	—	Oracle Park	20,897	53–63	L2
117	August 17	@ Giants	3–2	**Ramirez** (4–3)	Leone (3–4)	**Melancon** (17)	Oracle Park	22,649	54–63	W1
118	August 18	@ Giants	5–0	**Gallen** (9–2)	Webb (11–6)	—	Oracle Park	26,197	55–63	W2
119	August 19	Cardinals	1–5	Mikolas (10–9)	**Henry** (2–2)	—	**Chase Field**	32,183	55–64	L1
120	August 20	Cardinals	7–16	Cabrera (4–2)	**Bumgarner** (6–13)	—	**Chase Field**	34,248	55–65	L2
121	August 21	Cardinals	4–6	Woodford (2–0)	**Mantiply** (1–4)	Gallegos (12)	**Chase Field**	25,064	55–66	L3
122	August 23	@ Royals	7–3	**Mantiply** (2–4)	Staumont (3–3)	—	Kauffman Stadium	12,427	56–66	W1
123	August 24	@ Royals	3–5	Singer (7–4)	**Ramirez** (4–4)	—	Kauffman Stadium	10,531	56–67	L1
124	August 26	@ White Sox	7–2	**Henry** (3–2)	Cueto (6–6)	—	Guaranteed Rate Field	33,054	57–67	W1
125	August 27	@ White Sox	10–5	**Kelly** (11–5)	Martin (2–4)	—	Guaranteed Rate Field	25,837	58–67	W2
126	August 28	@ White Sox	3–2	**Ramirez** (5–4)	Graveman (3–3)	**Kennedy** (9)	Guaranteed Rate Field	29,781	59–67	W3
127	August 29	Phillies	13–7	**Frías** (1–0)	Sánchez (2–2)	—	**Chase Field**	18,594	60–67	W4
128	August 30	Phillies	12–3	**Gallen** (10–2)	Nola (9–11)	—	**Chase Field**	16,873	61–67	W5
129	August 31	Phillies	2–18	Falter (3–3)	**Henry** (3–3)	—	**Chase Field**	13,690	61–68	L1

September: 11–17 (Home: 6–8; Away: 5–9)

#	Date	Opponent	Score	Win	Loss	Save	Stadium	Attendance	Record	Streak
130	September 1	Brewers	5–0	**Kelly** (12–5)	Woodruff (9–4)	—	**Chase Field**	10,495	62–68	W1
131	September 2	Brewers	2–1	**K. Nelson** (2–0)	Lauer (10–6)	**Kennedy** (10)	**Chase Field**	13,488	63–68	W2
132	September 3	Brewers	6–8 (10)	Williams (6–3)	**Mantiply** (2–5)	Rogers (30)	**Chase Field**	22,138	63–69	L1
133	September 4	Brewers	5–1	**Gallen** (11–2)	Alexander (2–2)	—	**Chase Field**	20,274	64–69	W1
134	September 5	@ Padres	5–0	**R. Nelson** (1–0)	Snell (6–8)	—	Petco Park	37,713	65–69	W2
135	September 6	@ Padres	5–6	Martinez (4–3)	**Kennedy** (4–7)	—	Petco Park	31,308	65–70	L1
136	September 7	@ Padres	3–6	Darvish (13–7)	**Henry** (3–4)	Hader (31)	Petco Park	36,948	65–71	L2
137	September 9	@ Rockies	10–13	Bard (5–4)	**Smith** (1–2)	—	Coors Field	34,848	65–72	L3
138	September 10	@ Rockies	1–4	Lawrence (3–1)	**Bumgarner** (6–14)	Bard (29)	Coors Field	27,871	65–73	L4
139	September 11	@ Rockies	12–6	**Gallen** (12–2)	Feltner (2–8)	—	Coors Field	27,546	66–73	W1
140	September 12	Dodgers	0–6	Anderson (15–3)	**K. Nelson** (2–1)	—	**Chase Field**	19,393	66–74	L1
141	September 13	Dodgers	0–4	Kershaw (8–3)	**Kelly** (12–6)	—	**Chase Field**	21,143	66–75	L2
142	September 14	Dodgers	5–3 (10)	**Moronta** (1–0)	Kimbrel (4–6)	—	**Chase Field**	22,971	67–75	W1
143	September 15	Padres	4–0	**Jameson** (1–0)	Manaea (7–9)	—	**Chase Field**	17,121	68–75	W2
144	September 16	Padres	3–12	Snell (7–9)	**Bumgarner** (6–15)	—	**Chase Field**	19,945	68–76	L1
145	September 17	Padres	0–2	Musgrove (10–7)	**Gallen** (12–3)	Hader (33)	**Chase Field**	29,796	68–77	L2
146	September 18	Padres	1–6	Darvish (15–7)	**R. Nelson** (1–1)	—	**Chase Field**	20,480	68–78	L3
147	September 19	@ Dodgers	2–5	Kershaw (9–3)	**Kelly** (12–7)	—	Dodger Stadium	44,854	68–79	L4
148	September 20 (1)	@ Dodgers	5–6	Pepiot (3–0)	**Ginkel** (1–1)	Martin (2)	Dodger Stadium	38,902	68–80	L5
149	September 20 (2)	@ Dodgers	5–2	**Jameson** (2–0)	Anderson (15–4)	**Moronta** (1)	Dodger Stadium	43,097	69–80	W1
150	September 21	@ Dodgers	6–1	**Bumgarner** (7–15)	May (2–3)	—	Dodger Stadium	38,845	70–80	W2
151	September 22	@ Dodgers	2–3	Kimbrel (6–6)	**Moronta** (1–1)	—	Dodger Stadium	47,907	70–81	L1
152	September 23	Giants	5–6	Young (1–1)	**Smith** (1–3)	Doval (25)	**Chase Field**	25,949	70–82	L2
153	September 24	Giants	5–2	**Kelly** (13–7)	Cobb (6–7)	**Moronta** (2)	**Chase Field**	24,504	71–82	W1
154	September 25	Giants	2–3	Junis (5–6)	**Frías** (1–1)	Doval (26)	**Chase Field**	25,389	71–83	L1
155	September 27	@ Astros	2–10	García (14–8)	**Davies** (2–5)	—	Minute Maid Park	37,480	71–84	L2
156	September 28	@ Astros	5–2 (10)	**Moronta** (2–1)	Smith (0–3)	**Melancon** (18)	Minute Maid Park	35,670	72–84	W1
157	September 30	@ Giants	4–10	Cobb (7–7)	**Kelly** (13–8)	—	Oracle Park	28,478	72–85	L1

October: 2–3 (Home: 0–0; Away: 2–3)

#	Date	Opponent	Score	Win	Loss	Save	Stadium	Attendance	Record	Streak
158	October 1	@ Giants	8–4	**Jameson** (3–0)	Junis (5–7)	—	Oracle Park	30,630	73–85	W1
159	October 2	@ Giants	3–4 (10)	Cotton (4–2)	**Widener** (0–1)	—	Oracle Park	34,824	73–86	L1
160	October 3	@ Brewers	5–6 (10)	Boxberger (4–3)	**Moronta** (2–2)	—	American Family Field	18,612	73–87	L2
161	October 4	@ Brewers	0–3	Lauer (11–7)	**Gallen** (12–4)	Strzelecki (1)	American Family Field	19,611	73–88	L3
162	October 5	@ Brewers	4–2	**Poppen** (2–2)	Gott (3–4)	**Ginkel** (1)	American Family Field	18,765	74–88	W1

Legend: = Win = Loss = Postponement
Bold = Diamondbacks team member

=== Opening day ===
Opening Day Starters
Name	Position
Daulton Varsho	Center fielder
Ketel Marte	Second baseman
David Peralta	Left fielder
Christian Walker	First baseman
Pavin Smith	Right fielder
Carson Kelly	Catcher
Seth Beer	Designated Hitter
Drew Ellis	Third baseman
Geraldo Perdomo	Shortstop
Madison Bumgarner	Starting pitcher

== Statistics ==
=== Batting ===
(through October 5, 2022)
Players in bold are on the active roster.
Note: G = Games played; AB = At bats; R = Runs; H = Hits; 2B = Doubles; 3B = Triples; HR = Home runs; RBI = Runs batted in; SB = Stolen bases; BB = Walks; K = Strikeouts; AVG = Batting average; OBP = On-base percentage; SLG = Slugging percentage; TB = Total bases

Player	G	AB	R	H	2B	3B	HR	RBI	SB	BB	K	AVG	OBP	SLG	TB
Nick Ahmed	17	52	7	12	2	0	3	7	0	2	15	.231	.259	.442	23
**Sergio Alcántara**	71	170	23	41	8	1	6	26	1	10	45	.241	.283	.406	69
Seth Beer	38	111	4	21	3	0	1	9	0	11	31	.189	.278	.243	27
**Corbin Carroll**	32	104	13	27	9	2	4	14	2	8	31	.260	.330	.500	52
Matt Davison	5	10	1	1	0	0	1	1	0	3	3	.100	.308	.400	4
Wilmer Difo	3	6	0	0	0	0	0	0	0	0	1	.000	.000	.000	1
Drew Ellis	6	13	2	2	1	0	0	1	0	1	6	.154	.214	.231	3
Stone Garrett	27	76	13	21	8	0	4	10	3	3	27	.276	.309	.539	41
Grayson Greiner	2	6	0	1	0	0	0	0	0	2	3	.167	.375	.167	1
Josh Hager	28	50	4	12	2	0	0	3	0	8	17	.240	.345	.280	14
Yonny Hernández	12	24	2	2	0	0	0	0	2	2	4	.083	.154	.083	2
**José Herrera**	47	111	9	21	2	0	0	5	0	9	34	.189	.250	.207	23
Cooper Hummel	66	176	20	31	8	3	3	17	4	23	64	.176	.274	.307	54
**Carson Kelly**	104	317	40	67	18	0	7	35	2	29	71	.211	.282	.334	106
**Buddy Kennedy**	30	83	10	18	2	2	1	12	0	8	23	.217	.287	.325	27
**Jordan Luplow**	83	205	26	36	5	0	11	28	5	25	60	.176	.274	.361	74
**Ketel Marte**	137	492	68	118	42	2	12	52	5	55	101	.240	.321	.407	200
**Jake McCarthy**	99	321	53	91	16	3	8	43	23	23	76	.283	.342	.427	137
**David Peralta**	87	278	29	69	19	2	12	41	1	27	74	.248	.316	.460	128
**Geraldo Perdomo**	148	431	58	84	10	2	5	40	9	50	103	.195	.285	.262	113
**Emmanuel Rivera**	39	132	22	30	8	0	6	18	1	12	37	.227	.304	.424	56
**Joshua Rojas**	125	443	66	119	25	1	9	56	23	55	98	.269	.349	.391	173
Pavin Smith	75	245	24	54	9	0	9	33	1	28	67	.220	.300	.367	90
**Alek Thomas**	113	381	45	88	17	1	8	39	4	22	74	.231	.275	.344	131
**Daulton Varsho**	151	531	79	125	23	3	27	74	16	46	145	.235	.302	.443	235
**Christian Walker**	160	583	84	141	25	2	36	94	2	69	131	.242	.327	.477	278
**TEAM TOTALS**	162	5351	702	1232	262	24	173	658	104	531	1341	.230	.304	.385	2061

=== Pitching ===
(through October 5, 2022)
Players in bold are on the active roster.
Note: W = Wins; L = Losses; ERA = Earned run average; WHIP = Walks plus hits per inning pitched; G = Games pitched; GS = Games started; SV = Saves; IP = Innings pitched; H = Hits allowed; R = Runs allowed; ER = Earned runs allowed; BB = Walks allowed; K = Strikeouts

Player	W	L	ERA	WHIP	G	GS	SV	IP	H	R	ER	BB	K
**Madison Bumgarner**	7	15	4.88	1.44	30	30	0	158.2	179	97	86	49	112
Humberto Castellanos	3	2	5.68	1.40	11	9	0	44.1	50	29	28	12	32
Zach Davies	2	5	4.09	1.30	27	27	0	134.1	122	66	61	52	102
Chris Devenski	2	1	7.59	1.41	10	0	0	10.2	14	9	9	1	9
Luis Frías	1	1	10.59	2.35	15	0	0	17.0	23	20	20	17	14
Paul Fry	0	0	9.00	4.00	1	0	0	1.0	2	1	1	2	2
**Zac Gallen**	12	4	2.54	0.91	31	31	0	184.0	121	56	52	47	192
**Tyler Gilbert**	0	3	5.24	1.25	8	7	0	34.1	33	21	20	10	20
**Kevin Ginkel**	1	1	3.38	1.30	30	0	1	29.1	27	14	11	11	30
Jake Hager	0	0	7.71	1.29	3	0	0	2.1	3	2	2	0	1
**Tommy Henry**	3	4	5.36	1.45	9	9	0	47.0	47	28	28	21	36
Tyler Holton	0	0	3.00	1.11	10	0	0	9.0	8	3	3	2	6
**Drey Jameson**	3	0	1.48	1.11	4	4	0	24.1	20	4	4	7	24
**Carson Kelly**	0	0	7.71	2.36	4	0	0	4.2	9	4	4	2	0
**Merrill Kelly**	13	8	3.37	1.14	33	33	0	200.1	167	77	75	61	177
**Ian Kennedy**	4	7	5.36	1.57	57	0	10	50.1	57	33	30	22	44
Dallas Keuchel	0	2	9.64	1.82	4	4	0	18.2	27	22	20	7	18
**Joe Mantiply**	2	5	2.85	1.08	69	0	2	60.0	59	22	19	6	61
**Corbin Martin**	0	1	4.84	1.66	7	2	0	22.1	25	14	12	12	21
**Mark Melancon**	3	10	4.66	1.50	62	0	18	56.0	63	37	29	21	35
**Keynan Middleton**	1	2	5.29	1.12	18	0	0	17.0	16	13	10	3	15
Reyes Moronta	2	2	4.50	1.50	17	0	2	14.0	13	9	7	8	11
**Kyle Nelson**	2	1	2.19	1.08	43	1	0	37.0	26	10	9	14	30
**Ryne Nelson**	1	1	1.47	0.82	3	3	0	18.1	9	4	3	6	16
Matt Peacock	0	0	6.75	1.88	2	0	0	2.2	3	2	2	2	2
Óliver Pérez	1	1	15.75	2.25	7	0	0	4.0	8	9	7	1	1
Sean Poppen	2	2	4.40	1.36	29	0	0	28.2	27	15	14	12	22
**Noé Ramirez**	5	4	5.22	1.42	55	0	0	50.0	45	32	29	26	51
**Caleb Smith**	1	3	4.11	1.37	44	1	0	70.0	57	35	32	39	65
Edwin Uceta	0	0	5.82	1.24	10	0	0	17.0	14	12	11	7	13
**Luke Weaver**	1	1	7.71	1.78	12	1	0	16.1	24	14	14	5	19
J. B. Wendelken	2	1	5.28	1.35	29	0	0	29.0	25	18	17	14	21
Taylor Widener	0	0	3.63	1.56	14	0	0	17.1	22	8	7	5	14
**TEAM TOTALS**	74	88	4.25	1.29	162	162	33	1430.0	1345	740	676	504	1216

== Minor league affiliations ==
Level	Team	League	Location	Manager
Triple-A	Reno Aces	Pacific Coast League	Reno, Nevada	
Double-A	Amarillo Sod Poodles	Texas League	Amarillo, Texas	
High-A	Hillsboro Hops	Northwest League	Hillsboro, Oregon	
Low-A	Visalia Rawhide	California League	Visalia, California	
Rookie	ACL D-backs	Arizona Complex League	Scottsdale, Arizona	
Rookie	DSL D-backs 1	Dominican Summer League	Boca Chica, Santo Domingo	
Rookie	DSL D-backs 2	Dominican Summer League	Boca Chica, Santo Domingo	
