= Drew Hedman =

American baseball player and coach (born 1986)

Chicago Cubs
- First baseman / Left fielder / Coach
- Born: July 20, 1986 (age 39); Redding, California, U.S.
- Bats: Left Throws: Left

Teams
- As coach: Arizona Diamondbacks (2021–2024); Chicago Cubs (2025–present)

Drew Arvid Hedman (born July 20, 1986) is an American former professional baseball first baseman current hitting coach for the Chicago Cubs. he previously was the co-hitting for the Arizona Diamondbacks of Major League Baseball (MLB). During his playing career, Hedman has also played left field.

== Playing career ==
Hedman attended Pomona College and played college baseball for the Pomona-Pitzer Sagehens, where he was the National Collegiate Baseball Writers Association's Division III "Hitter of the Year" as a senior after compiling a Division-III leading 23 home runs, 79 runs batted in with a .500/.578/1.038 slash line. He was drafted by the Boston Red Sox in the 50th round (1,518th overall) in the 2009 Major League Baseball first-year player draft and played four years in the Red Sox organization, although he never advanced past the Double-A level.

== Coaching career ==
Hedman retired from professional baseball and joined the coaching staff at Vanderbilt as their volunteer assistant, where they won the College World Series in his lone season with the program. He left Vanderbilt to join the front office of the Washington Nationals as an intern before leaving to join a Washington D.C.–based company that runs baseball camps and showcases. He was hired as an advance scout by the Arizona Diamondbacks in 2018 and was named the newly created run production coordinator for the Diamondbacks in 2019. He was promoted to co-hitting coach for the Diamondbacks in 2021 alongside Rick Short after Darnell Coles and Eric Hinske were fired. On November 27, 2024, Hedman was hired by the Chicago Cubs for the same position.

Sporting positions
Preceded by Darnell Coles	Arizona Diamondbacks hitting coach 2021–2024; With: Rick Short	Succeeded by Joe Mather
