= Joe Mather =

American baseball player & coach (born 1982)

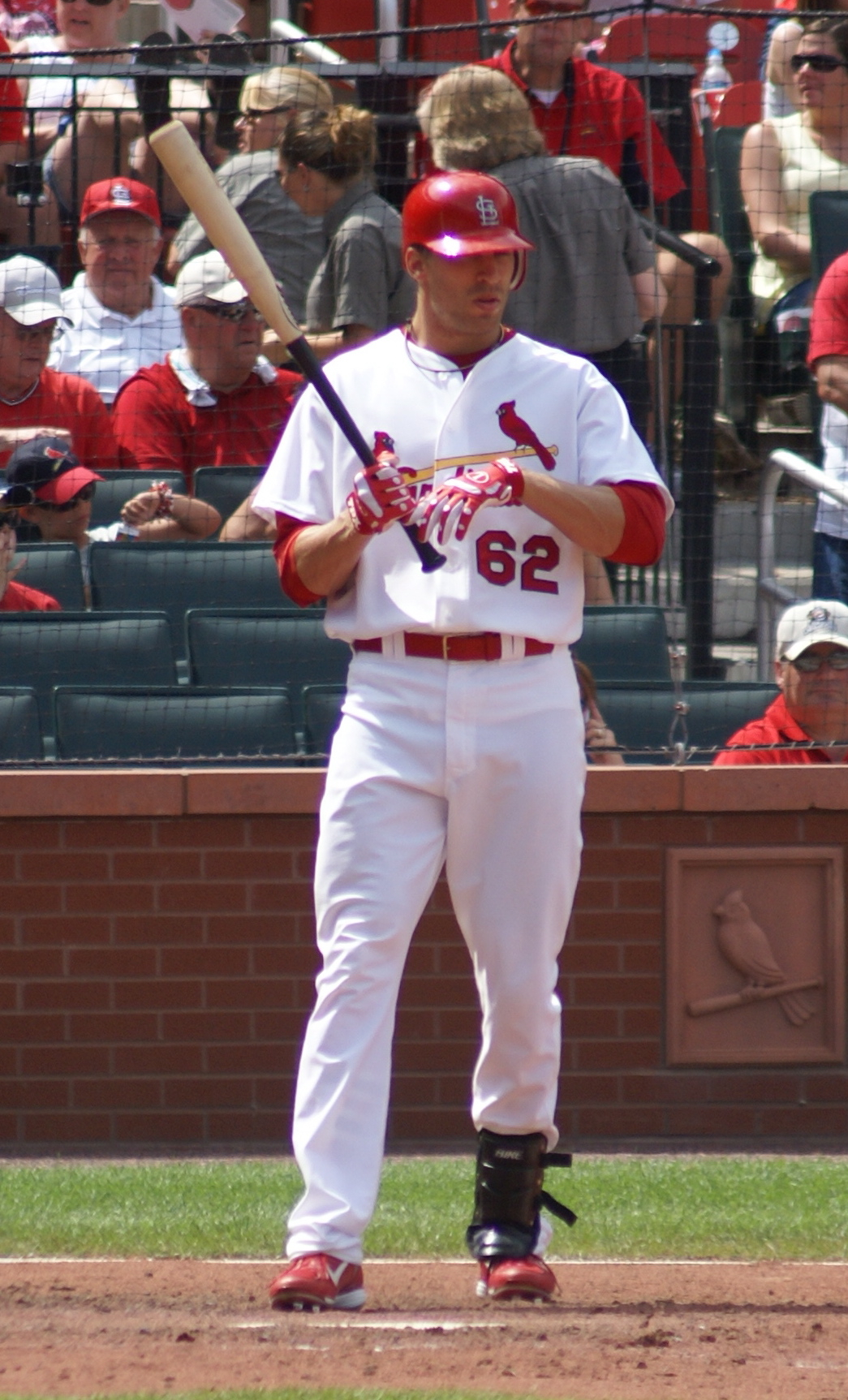
- Mather with the St. Louis Cardinals

Arizona Diamondbacks – No. 74
- Outfielder / Coach
- Born: July 23, 1982 (age 44); Sandpoint, Idaho, U.S.
- Batted: Right Threw: Right

MLB debut
- May 30, 2008, for the St. Louis Cardinals

Last MLB appearance
- October 1, 2012, for the Chicago Cubs

MLB statistics
- Batting average: .219
- Home runs: 14
- Runs batted in: 49
- Stats at Baseball Reference

Teams
- As player: St. Louis Cardinals (2008, 2010); Atlanta Braves (2011); Chicago Cubs (2012); As coach: Cincinnati Reds (2020–2021); Arizona Diamondbacks (2022–present)

Joe Mather (born July 23, 1982) is an American former professional baseball outfielder and current coach. He is the hitting coach for the Arizona Diamondbacks of Major League Baseball (MLB). He previously was a coach for the Cincinnati Reds. He played in MLB for the St. Louis Cardinals, Atlanta Braves and Chicago Cubs.

== Early life ==
Mather was born on July 23, 1982, in Sandpoint, Idaho. At Mountain Pointe High School in Phoenix, Arizona, he played basketball and was also an All-State performer in baseball. He also set the school record for the most RBI and home runs in a career.

== Professional playing career ==
=== Minor leagues ===
In 38 games with the Memphis Redbirds before his promotion to the St. Louis Cardinals, Mather hit .315 with 12 home runs, 24 RBI, and slugged .671.

=== St. Louis Cardinals ===
On May 30, 2008, Mather was promoted from Triple-A to the Major league club after outfielder Chris Duncan was optioned to Triple-A . On the same day as his call-up, he was in the starting lineup as the right fielder for the Cardinals. He picked up his first major league hit and RBI in the 7th inning, driving in the game-winning run.

He was the last man cut in April 2009, for the team to get to the 25-man roster before Opening Day (Apr. 6). On April 17, 2010, Mather came in for a stint as pitcher in the 19th and 20th innings against the New York Mets, picking up the loss in the game when the Mets won 2–1 in the 20th.

=== Atlanta Braves ===
Mather was claimed by the Atlanta Braves on November 3, 2010. After failing to make the Braves' 2011 Opening Day roster, the organization placed him on outright waivers. He cleared waivers and was sent to Triple-A Gwinnett Braves. On April 28, he had his contract purchased from the minors by the Braves, a move that general manager, Frank Wren, described as a "necessity." He had a career-high four-hit, four-RBI night when the Braves faced the Angels on May 21, 2011. He was designated for assignment on June 19 and was later outrighted to Triple-A, but he instead opted for free agency.

=== Colorado Rockies ===
On July 4, 2011, Mather signed with the Colorado Rockies.

=== Chicago Cubs ===
Mather signed a minor league contract with the Chicago Cubs on January 4, 2012. With a successful spring, Mather made the Cubs opening day roster.

=== Philadelphia Phillies ===
The Philadelphia Phillies signed Mather to a minor league contract but he did not make the team and was released.

=== Lancaster Barnstormers ===
He subsequently signed with the Lancaster Barnstormers in the Atlantic League of Professional Baseball.

=== Cincinnati Reds ===
On May 6, 2013, the Cincinnati Reds signed Mather to a minor league contract and assigned him to the Double A Pensacola Blue Wahoos.

=== Bridgeport Bluefish ===
Mather signed with the Bridgeport Bluefish for the 2014 season.

== Coaching career ==
Mather joined the Arizona Diamondbacks organization in 2015, and served as a coach for the Missoula Osprey in 2015 and 2016. He served as the bench coach for the Jackson Generals in 2017. He served as the manager of the Visalia Rawhide in 2018. He spent the 2019 season as the Diamondbacks minor league field and hitting coordinator.

Mather was hired by the Cincinnati Reds to serve as their assistant hitting coach on December 17, 2019.

On October 28, 2021, the Arizona Diamondbacks hired Mather as their hitting coach for the 2022 season.

== Personal life ==
Mather resides in Phoenix, Arizona, and enjoys playing golf in his free time.

Sporting positions
Preceded by Donnie Ecker	Cincinnati Reds assistant hitting coach 2020-2021	Succeeded by Joel McKeithan
Preceded by Rick Short/Drew Hedman	Arizona Diamondbacks hitting coach 2022-present	Succeeded by Incumbent
