= Sean Poppen =

American baseball player (born 1994)

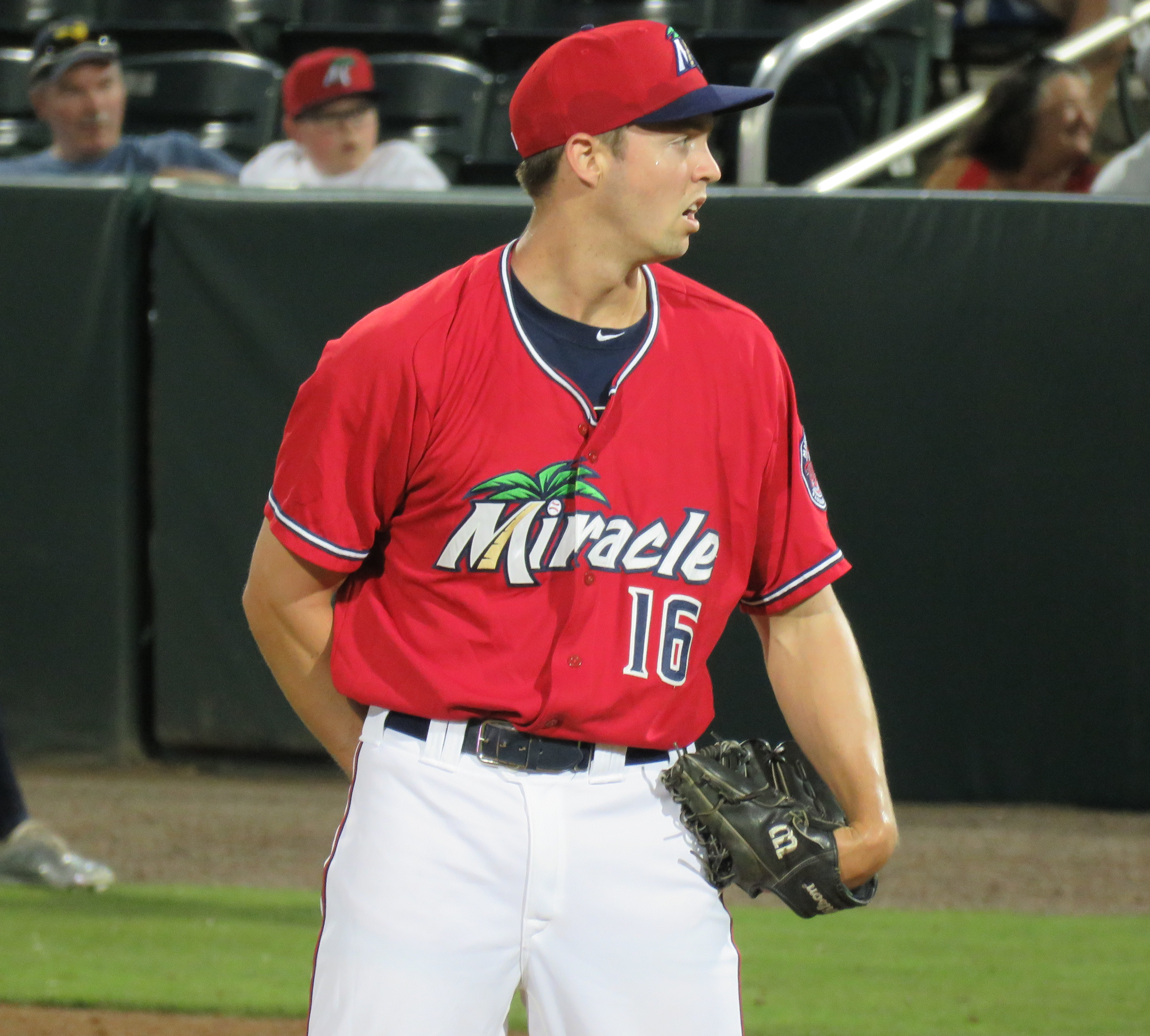
- Poppen with the Fort Myers Miracle in 2018

Free agent
- Pitcher
- Born: March 15, 1994 (age 31); Virginia Beach, Virginia, U.S.
- Bats: Right Throws: Right

MLB debut
- June 19, 2019, for the Minnesota Twins

MLB statistics (through 2022 season)
- Win–loss record: 3–3
- Earned run average: 5.08
- Strikeouts: 67
- Stats at Baseball Reference

Teams
- Minnesota Twins (2019–2020); Pittsburgh Pirates (2021); Tampa Bay Rays (2021); Arizona Diamondbacks (2021–2022)

Sean Russell Poppen (born March 15, 1994) is an American professional baseball pitcher who is a free agent. He has previously played in Major League Baseball (MLB) for the Minnesota Twins, Pittsburgh Pirates, Tampa Bay Rays, and Arizona Diamondbacks.

== Career ==
Poppen attended Cape Henry Collegiate in Virginia Beach, Virginia. He attended Harvard University for four years (2013 through 2016), and played college baseball for the Crimson.

=== Minnesota Twins ===
Poppen was drafted by the Minnesota Twins in the 19th round, with the 573rd overall selection, of the 2016 MLB draft. He spent the 2016 season with the Elizabethton Twins and the Cedar Rapids Kernels. In 2017, he played for Cedar Rapids and the Fort Myers Miracle. His 2018 was split between Fort Myers and the Chattanooga Lookouts. He split the 2019 minor league season between the Pensacola Blue Wahoos and the Rochester Red Wings, going a combined 7–4 with a 4.01 ERA over 89.2 innings.

On June 19, 2019, his contract was selected and he was called up to the major leagues for the first time. He made his debut that night versus the Boston Red Sox. He posted a 0–0 record with a 7.56 ERA over 8.1 innings for the Twins in 2019. Poppen finished the 2019 season on the injured list with elbow inflammation.

Poppen was designated for assignment by the Twins on September 29, 2020, when Alex Kirilloff was selected to the 40-man roster. With the 2020 Minnesota Twins, Poppen appeared in 6 games, compiling a 0–0 record with 4.70 ERA and 10 strikeouts in 7.2 innings pitched.

=== Pittsburgh Pirates ===
On October 1, 2020, Poppen was claimed off waivers by the Pittsburgh Pirates. Poppen recorded a 7.71 ERA in 3 appearances before being designated for assignment on May 13, 2021.

=== Tampa Bay Rays ===
On May 18, 2021, Poppen was traded to the Tampa Bay Rays in exchange for cash considerations. He was designated for assignment on July 30, 2021.

=== Arizona Diamondbacks ===
On August 2, 2021, Poppen was claimed off of waivers by the Arizona Diamondbacks. He finished the season appearing in 20 games for Arizona, registering a 1–1 record and 4.67 ERA with 21 strikeouts in 17.1 innings pitched.

In 2022, Poppen made 29 appearances for the Diamondbacks, pitching to a 2–2 record and 4.40 ERA with 22 strikeouts in 28.2 innings of work.

=== San Diego Padres ===
On December 2, 2022, Poppen was claimed off waivers by the San Diego Padres. On January 20, 2023, Poppen was removed from the 40-man roster and sent outright to the Triple-A El Paso Chihuahuas. In 47 games for El Paso, he struggled to a 1–4 record and 6.33 ERA with 51 strikeouts across 58 1/3 innings pitched. Poppen elected free agency following the season on November 6.

=== Seattle Mariners ===
On January 18, 2024, Poppen signed a minor league contract with the Seattle Mariners. In two appearances for the Triple–A Tacoma Rainiers, he surrendered four runs in 3 1/3 innings pitched. Poppen was released by the Mariners organization on April 5.

=== Gastonia Baseball Club ===
On April 26, 2024, Poppen signed with the Gastonia Baseball Club of the Atlantic League of Professional Baseball. In 12 games for the team, he logged a 5.11 ERA with 35 strikeouts across 24 2/3 innings pitched. On June 17, Poppen was released by Gastonia.

=== Tecolotes de los Dos Laredos ===
On January 29, 2025, Poppen signed with the Tecolotes de los Dos Laredos of the Mexican League. Poppen made three scoreless appearances for Dos Laredos, recording five strikeouts across 3 2/3 innings pitched.

=== Los Angeles Angels ===
On April 28, 2025, Poppen signed a minor league contract with the Los Angeles Angels. In 22 appearances split between the rookie-level Arizona Complex League Angels and Double-A Rocket City Trash Pandas, he accumulated a 3-4 record and 5.34 ERA with 38 strikeouts across 30 1/3 innings pitched. Poppen was released by the Angels organization on August 2.

== Personal life ==
In 2016 Poppen graduated (with honors) from Harvard, double majoring in Chemistry and Physics, and Engineering Sciences.
