= Drew Ellis (baseball) =

American baseball player (born 1995)

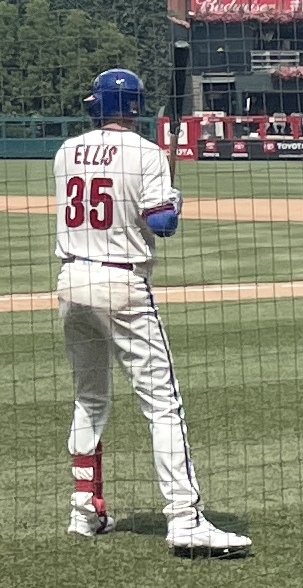
- Ellis with the Phillies in 2023
- Third baseman
- Born: December 1, 1995 (age 30); Louisville, Kentucky, U.S.
- Batted: Right Threw: Right

MLB debut
- July 30, 2021, for the Arizona Diamondbacks

Last MLB appearance
- July 16, 2023, for the Philadelphia Phillies

MLB statistics
- Batting average: .157
- Home runs: 3
- Runs batted in: 10
- Stats at Baseball Reference

Teams
- Arizona Diamondbacks (2021–2022); Seattle Mariners (2022); Philadelphia Phillies (2023)

Drew Mitchell Ellis (born December 1, 1995) is an American former professional baseball third baseman. He played in Major League Baseball (MLB) for the Arizona Diamondbacks, Seattle Mariners, and Philadelphia Phillies.

== Early life and amateur career ==
Ellis is from Jeffersonville, Indiana. Ellis’ father, Derek played college baseball at Indiana State University. Ellis played in the 2008 Little League World Series. He attended Jeffersonville High School, where he played baseball and basketball and the University of Louisville, where he played college baseball for the Louisville Cardinals. With Louisville, he was the backup third baseman behind Blake Tiberi, but was moved into left field to get into the lineup. As a sophomore, Ellis returned to playing as a third baseman.

== Professional career ==
=== Arizona Diamondbacks ===
The Arizona Diamondbacks selected Ellis in the second round, with the 44th overall selection, of the 2017 MLB draft. Ellis signed with the Diamondbacks, receiving a $1,560,100 signing bonus. He made his professional debut and spent the 2017 season with the Hillsboro Hops of the Low-A Northwest League where he posted a .227 batting average with eight home runs and 23 runs batted in (RBIs). Ellis spent the 2018 season with the Visalia Rawhide of the High-A California League, slashing .246/.331/.429 with 15 home runs and 71 RBIs in 120 games.

Ellis spent the 2019 season with the Jackson Generals of the Double-A Southern League. Over 118 games, he hit .234/.344/.406 with 14 home runs and 63 RBIs. Ellis did not play in a game in 2020 due to the cancellation of the minor league season because of the COVID-19 pandemic. He opened the 2021 season with the Triple-A Reno Aces.

On July 30, 2021, Arizona selected his contract and promoted him to the active roster. He made his MLB debut that night. He made 28 appearances for the big league club, hitting .130/.277/.203 with one home run and five RBIs.

In 2022, Ellis got into six games for the Diamondbacks, going 2-for-13 with a walk in 14 plate appearances. The Diamondbacks designated Ellis for assignment on June 12, 2022.

=== Seattle Mariners ===
On June 16, 2022, the Seattle Mariners claimed Ellis off of waivers. Ellis made one major league appearance for Seattle, going 1-for-3 with a strikeout. The bulk of his stint with the club was spent with the Triple-A Tacoma Rainiers, where he played in 70 games and hit .231/.346/.488 with 15 home runs, 39 RBIs, and four stolen bases. On November 3, 2022, he was removed from the 40-man roster and sent outright to Triple-A. He was invited to spring training with Seattle in 2023, but was released prior to the start of the season on March 17, 2023.

=== Philadelphia Phillies ===
On April 16, 2023, Ellis signed a minor league contract with the Philadelphia Phillies organization. Ellis played in 11 games for the Double-A Reading Fightin Phils before being elevated to the Triple-A Lehigh Valley IronPigs. In 11 games with Lehigh, Ellis batted .279/.354/.651 with 5 home runs and 19 RBI. On June 1, Ellis' contract was selected to the major league roster. On June 4, Ellis hit his first two home runs for the Phillies in an 11–3 victory over the Washington Nationals. In 12 games for the Phillies, he went 5–for–23 (.217) with 6 walks and 4 RBI. On September 22, Ellis was designated for assignment following the promotion of Orion Kerkering. He cleared waivers and was sent outright to Lehigh Valley on September 24. Ellis elected free agency on October 13.

=== Charleston Dirty Birds ===
On April 23, 2024, Ellis signed with the Charleston Dirty Birds of the Atlantic League of Professional Baseball. In 10 games for the Dirty Birds, Ellis batted .231/.348/.436 with one home run and six RBI.

=== Los Angeles Angels ===
On May 6, 2024, Ellis signed a minor league contract with the Los Angeles Angels organization. In 32 games for the Triple–A Salt Lake Bees, he batted .243/.373/.414 with five home runs and 13 RBI. Ellis was released by the Angels organization on July 29.

=== Lexington Legends ===
On April 16, 2025, Ellis signed with the Lexington Legends of the Atlantic League of Professional Baseball. In 13 games for Lexington, Ellis slashed .373/.467/.765 with five home runs and 11 RBI.

=== San Francisco Giants ===
On May 14, 2025, Ellis had his contract purchased by the San Francisco Giants organization. He made 68 appearances split between the Double-A Richmond Flying Squirrels and Triple-A Sacramento River Cats, slashing a cumulative .201/.320/.388 with 11 home runs and 29 RBI. Ellis elected free agency following the season on November 6.

On May 26, 2026, Ellis announced his retirement via his Instagram account.
