= Humberto Castellanos =

Mexican baseball player (born 1998)

Diablos Rojos del México – No. 9
- Pitcher
- Born: April 3, 1998 (age 28); Tepatitlán, Jalisco, Mexico
- Bats: Right Throws: Right

Professional debut
- MLB: August 4, 2020, for the Houston Astros
- CPBL: March 30, 2025, for the CTBC Brothers

MLB statistics (through 2024 season)
- Win–loss record: 5–5
- Earned run average: 5.43
- Strikeouts: 80

CPBL statistics (through 2025 season)
- Win–loss record: 10–7
- Earned run average: 3.15
- Strikeouts: 96
- Stats at Baseball Reference

Teams
- Houston Astros (2020); Arizona Diamondbacks (2021–2022, 2024); CTBC Brothers (2025)
Medals
Men's baseball
Representing Mexico
WBSC Premier12
Bronze medal – third place	2019 Tokyo	Team

Humberto Castellanos (born April 3, 1998) is a Mexican professional baseball pitcher for the Diablos Rojos del México of the Mexican League. He has previously played in Major League Baseball (MLB) for the Houston Astros and Arizona Diamondbacks and in Chinese Professional Baseball League (CPBL) for the CTBC Brothers.

== Career ==
=== Houston Astros ===
On July 2, 2015, Castellanos signed a minor league contract with Houston Astros. He made his professional debut in 2016 for the Dominican Summer League Astros. In 2017, he split the year between the rookie-level Gulf Coast Astros and Greenville Astros, and the Low-A Tri-City ValleyCats. In 14 games between the three affiliates, Castellanos posted a 6–1 record and 2.35 ERA with 40 strikeouts in 46 innings pitched.

Castellanos appeared in 23 games split between Tri-City and the Single-A Quad Cities River Bandits in 2018, working to a 3–2 record and 2.00 ERA with 50 strikeouts in 45 innings of work. In 2019, he split the season between Quad Cities, High-A Fayetteville Woodpeckers, and Triple-A Round Rock Express. Appearing in 34 contests for the three teams, Castellanos recorded a 4–2 record and 2.89 ERA with 83 strikeouts and 7 saves in 74 2/3 innings pitched. He was not immediately assigned to an affiliate to begin the 2020 season after the minor league season was cancelled because of the COVID-19 pandemic.

On August 2, 2020, Castellanos was selected to the 40-man roster and promoted to the major leagues for the first time. On August 4, he made his MLB debut against the Arizona Diamondbacks and pitched a scoreless ninth inning. He made 8 appearances for Houston in his rookie campaign, posting a 6.75 ERA with 12 strikeouts in 10 2/3 innings of work. On January 22, 2021, Castellanos was designated for assignment by the Astros.

=== Arizona Diamondbacks ===
On January 29, 2021, Castellanos was claimed off waivers by the Arizona Diamondbacks. He earned his first win and career hit in his second career start on August 18, against the Philadelphia Phillies. He made 14 appearances for Arizona in 2021, posting a 2–2 record and 4.93 ERA with 29 strikeouts in 45 2/3 innings of work.

On June 1, 2022, Castellanos was placed on the injured list with a right elbow strain. On August 9, Castellanos underwent Tommy John surgery, ending his season. On the year, he had appeared in 11 games (9 of them starts), and recorded a 3–2 record and 5.68 ERA with 32 strikeouts in 44 1/3 innings pitched. On November 9, Castellanos was designated for assignment. He cleared waivers and was sent outright to the Triple-A Reno Aces on November 11.

After missing all of 2023 in rehabilitation, Castellanos began the 2024 campaign with Triple–A Reno, recording a 4.57 ERA across 10 games (9 starts). On June 6, the Diamondbacks selected Castellanos' contract, adding him to their active roster. In 7 games for Arizona, he logged a 5.23 ERA with 7 strikeouts and 1 save across 10 1/3 innings pitched. Castellanos was designated for assignment by the Diamondbacks on August 11. He cleared waivers and was sent outright to Reno on August 16. Castellanos elected free agency on October 14.

=== CTBC Brothers ===
On February 6, 2025, Castellanos signed with the CTBC Brothers of the Chinese Professional Baseball League. In 23 starts, he posted a 10–7 record with a 3.15 ERA and 96 strikeouts across 123 innings pitched. Castellanos became a free agent following the season.

=== Diablos Rojos del México ===
On March 12, 2026, Castellanos signed with the Diablos Rojos del México of the Mexican League.

== International career ==
October 7, 2019, Castellanos was selected for Mexico national baseball team at the 2019 WBSC Premier12.
