= Jake Hager (baseball) =

American baseball player (born 1993)

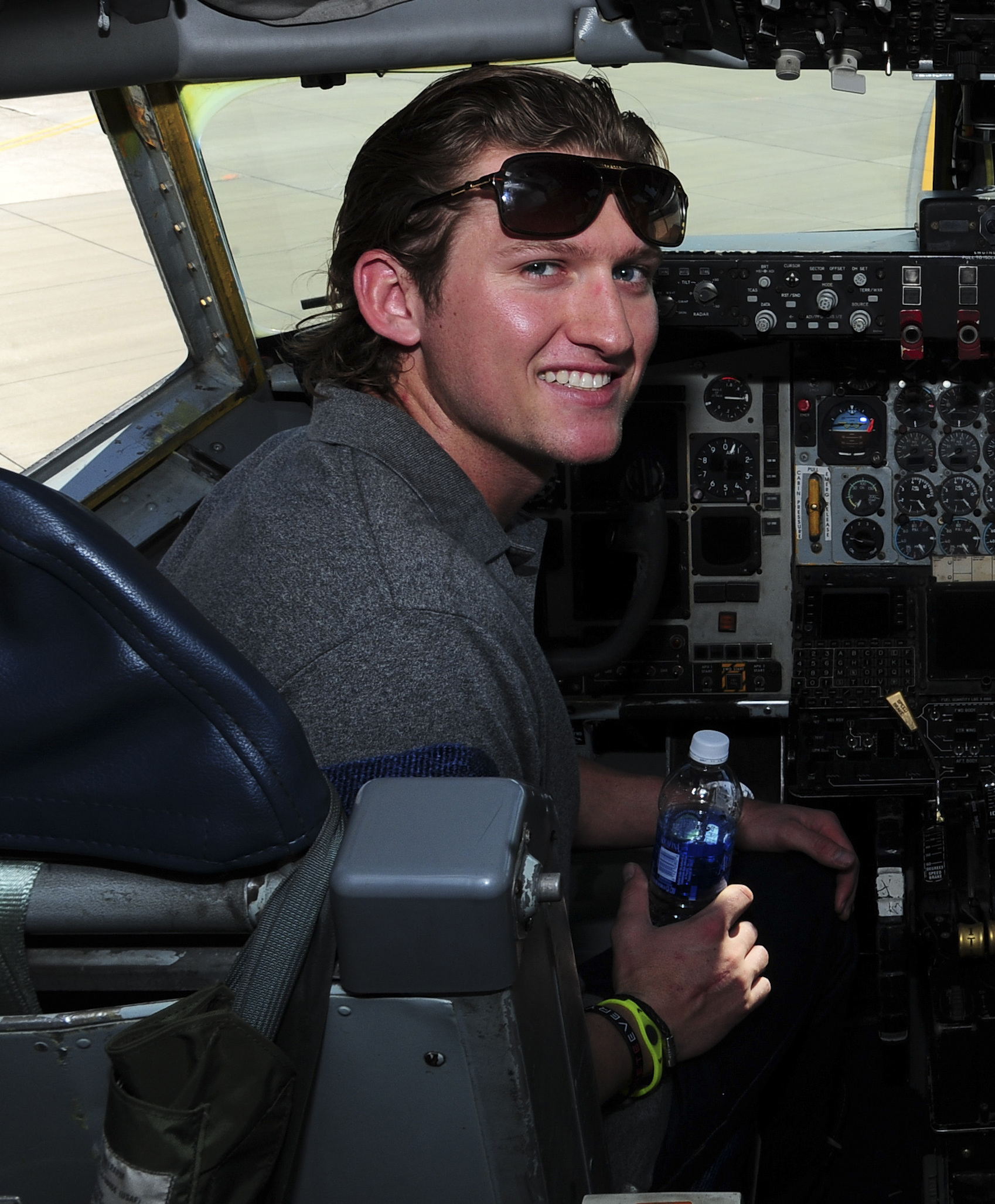
- Hager at MacDill Air Force Base in 2013
- Shortstop / Second baseman
- Born: March 4, 1993 (age 33); Henderson, Nevada, U.S.
- Batted: Right Threw: Right

MLB debut
- May 15, 2021, for the New York Mets

Last MLB appearance
- July 6, 2022, for the Arizona Diamondbacks

MLB statistics
- Batting average: .197
- Home runs: 0
- Runs batted in: 5
- Stats at Baseball Reference

Teams
- New York Mets (2021); Arizona Diamondbacks (2021–2022)

Jake William Hager (born March 4, 1993) is an American former professional baseball shortstop. He played in Major League Baseball (MLB) for the New York Mets and Arizona Diamondbacks.

== Playing career ==
=== Tampa Bay Rays ===
Hager attended Sierra Vista High School in Spring Valley, Nevada, where he was a four-year starter on the baseball team. As a senior, he was the Nevada Gatorade Baseball Player of the Year after batting .547 with 11 home runs and 57 RBI. Hager was drafted by the Tampa Bay Rays in the first round (32nd overall) of the 2011 Major League Baseball draft. He signed with the Rays rather than play college baseball at Arizona State University.

After signing, Hager made his professional debut that same year for rookie–level Princeton Rays and spent the whole season there, batting .269 with four home runs and 17 RBI in 47 games. He played for the Single–A Bowling Green Hot Rods in 2012 where he slashed .281/.345/.412 with ten home runs and 72 RBI in 114 games, the High–A Charlotte Stone Crabs in 2013 where he batted .258 with 33 RBI in 113 games, and the Double–A Montgomery Biscuits in 2014 where he posted a .271 batting average with four home runs and 47 RBI in 114 games.

On April 5, 2015, it was announced that Hager would require knee surgery, necessitating a six-month recovery and ruling him out for the entirety of the season. In 2016, Hager played for Montgomery and the Triple–A Durham Bulls where he batted a combined a combined .233 with four home runs and 38 RBI in 114 games, and in 2017, he returned to Durham where he slashed .229/.275/.328 with four home runs and 26 RBI in 73 games. Hager elected free agency on November 6, 2017.

=== Milwaukee Brewers ===
On February 9, 2018, Hager signed with the St. Paul Saints of the American Association. On February 20, Hager signed a minor league contract with the Milwaukee Brewers. He was assigned to the Biloxi Shuckers.

On October 29, 2018, Hager re-signed with Milwaukee on a minor league contract that included an invitation to spring training. He spent the 2019 campaign with the Triple–A San Antonio Missions, playing in 114 games and slashing .242/.304/.413 with 12 home runs and 41 RBI. Hager elected free agency following the season on November 4, 2019.

=== New York Mets ===
On January 9, 2020, Hager signed a minor league contract the New York Mets organization. Hager did not play in a game in 2020 due to the cancellation of the minor league season because of the COVID-19 pandemic. He became a free agent on November 2. On November 4, 2020, Hager re-signed with the Mets on a new minor league contract.

On May 15, 2021, Hager was selected to the Mets 40-man roster and was promoted to the major leagues for the first time. He made his MLB debut for the Mets that day against his former draft team the Tampa Bay Rays as a pinch hitter in the top of the 9th inning for Kevin Pillar, lining out to center field in his only at-bat. On May 21, Hager recorded his first major league hit, a single off of Miami Marlins reliever Adam Cimber. He was designated for assignment the next day after hitting .125 in 5 games.

=== Milwaukee Brewers (second stint) ===
On May 25, 2021, Hager was claimed off waivers by the Milwaukee Brewers. Hager posted a .211/.288/.394 slash line for the Triple-A Nashville Sounds before being designated for assignment on June 18. He did not make an MLB appearance with the Brewers before his designation.

=== Seattle Mariners ===
On June 22, 2021, Hager was claimed off waivers by the Seattle Mariners. Hager hit .214/.294/.469 with 6 home runs and 11 RBI in 26 games for the Triple-A Tacoma Rainiers before he was designated for assignment on July 27.

=== Arizona Diamondbacks ===
On July 30, 2021, Hager was claimed off of waivers by the Arizona Diamondbacks. Hager appeared in 9 games for the Diamondbacks, going 2-for-18 (.111) with 2 RBI. On September 12, Hager was outrighted off of the 40-man roster and assigned to the Triple-A Reno Aces. He became a free agent following the season, but re-signed on minor league contract on December 1.

Hager was assigned to Triple-A Reno to begin the 2022 season. On May 16, 2022, Hager was selected to the active roster and started Game 1 of that day's doubleheader against the Los Angeles Dodgers. In 28 games for Arizona, Hager batted .240/.345/.280 with no home runs and 3 RBI. He was designated for assignment on August 22. He cleared waivers and was sent outright to Triple–A Reno on August 24. On October 2, Hager was re-selected to Arizona's 40-man and active rosters, but did not make another appearance for the team to finish out the season. On November 3, Hager was removed from the 40-man roster and sent outright to Triple–A; he subsequently elected free agency in lieu of the assignment.

On January 30, 2023, Hager re-signed with the Diamondbacks on a minor league contract. In an April 27 game in which Reno defeated the Sugar Land Space Cowboys 24–2, Hager recorded 5 hits in 5 at-bats with a home run and 8 RBI. The 8 runs batted in tied an Aces team record, last accomplished by Cole Gillespie in 2012. In 56 games for Reno, he hit .245/.301/.415 with 3 home runs and 30 RBI. On August 10, Hager was released by the Diamondbacks organization.

=== Chicago Cubs ===
On June 28, 2024, Hager signed a minor league contract with the Chicago Cubs organization. In 39 games for the Triple–A Iowa Cubs, he slashed .221/.269/.328 with two home runs and nine RBI. Hager retired from professional baseball on September 2.

== Coaching career ==
On January 22, 2026, Hager was announced as the assistant hitting coach and infield coach for the Binghamton Rumble Ponies, the Double-A affiliate of the New York Mets.
