= Rick Short =

American baseball player & coach (born 1972)

Arizona Diamondbacks – No. 73
- Second baseman / Coach
- Born: December 6, 1972 (age 52); Elgin, Illinois, U.S.
- Batted: Right Threw: Right

Professional debut
- NPB: March 28, 2003, for the Chiba Lotte Marines
- MLB: June 10, 2005, for the Washington Nationals

Last appearance
- MLB: September 23, 2005, for the Washington Nationals
- NPB: August 23, 2009, for the Tohoku Rakuten Golden Eagles

NPB statistics
- Batting average: .314
- Home runs: 35
- Runs batted in: 229

MLB statistics
- Batting average: .400
- Home runs: 2
- Runs batted in: 4
- Stats at Baseball Reference

Teams
- As player: Chiba Lotte Marines (2003); Washington Nationals (2005); Tohoku Rakuten Golden Eagles (2006–2009); As coach: Arizona Diamondbacks (2021–present)

Career highlights and awards
- 1× NPB All-Star (2008); 1× Pacific League Best Nine Award (2008); 1× Pacific League batting champion (2008)

Richard Ryan Short (born December 6, 1972) is an American former professional baseball second baseman who currently serves as the minor league field coordinator for the Arizona Diamondbacks of Major League Baseball (MLB). He played in MLB for the Washington Nationals, and in Nippon Professional Baseball (NPB) for the Chiba Lotte Marines and Tohoku Rakuten Golden Eagles. He bats and throws right-handed. He is an alumnus of Western Illinois University and Larkin High School in Elgin, IL.

== Playing career ==
Short was drafted in 1994 by the Baltimore Orioles in the 33rd round. He played eleven seasons in the minors and one in NPB before playing his first game in MLB. While having an impressive offensive season for the Triple-A New Orleans Zephyrs, Short was called up to MLB by the Washington Nationals after twelve years in the minors and made his MLB debut on June 10, 2005, collecting a pinch hit RBI in his first MLB at-bat.

He was sent back to New Orleans the next day. Short grabbed attention later in 2005, when he was hitting .400 for New Orleans with only 24 games left, resulting in the opportunity for him to become the first player to hit .400 in the Pacific Coast League since 1933. However, Short did not break the record, finishing the season with a .383 average, he was promoted to the Nationals again in September. On September 7, Short hit his first major league home run against Dontrelle Willis of the Florida Marlins at RFK Stadium. Four days later, he hit his 2nd home run off of John Smoltz. Short's season ended on September 23, when he suffered a shoulder injury. He ended the season with six hits in 15 at-bats across 11 MLB games, giving him a .400 average.

After the 2005 season, Short's contract was sold to the Tohoku Rakuten Golden Eagles. It marked the second stint for Short in Japan—in 2003, he played for the Chiba Lotte Marines and hit .303 with 12 home runs and 58 RBI. He has hit over .300 in each season (2006, 2007, 2008) since his arrival, ranked not lower than third in three years, including one highest hit rate(.332) in 2008. Rick has shown versatility with the Golden Eagles playing first, second, and third base along with the outfield during the 2008 season.

Short has played in 1290 minor league games over 12 years and has a .317 career minor league average.

== Coaching career ==
In February 2019, Short was named as the Hitting Coach for the Double–A Jackson Generals. On June 10, 2021, Short was promoted to be a co-hitting coach for the Arizona Diamondbacks following the firing of Darnell Coles and Eric Hinske.

On December 13, 2024, the Diamondbacks announced that Short would be shifting the role of minor league field coordinator.
