= Philadelphia Phillies =

American Major League Baseball team

- 2026 Philadelphia Phillies season

Logo	Cap insignia
- Established in 1883

Major league affiliations
- National League (1883–present); East Division (1969–present)

Current uniform
- Retired numbers: 1; 14; 15; 20; 32; 34; 36; 42; P; P; P; P; P

Colors
- Red, white, blue

Name
- Philadelphia Phillies (1883–present); Philadelphia Blue Jays/Phillies (1944–1949); Philadelphia Phils (1942); Philadelphia Quakers/Phillies (1883–1889)

Nicknames
- Phils; The Fightin' Phils; The Fightins; Whiz Kids (1950); Wheeze Kids (1983); Macho Row (1993)

Ballpark
- Citizens Bank Park (2004–present); Veterans Stadium (1971–2003); Shibe Park (1938–1970); Baker Bowl (1887–1938); Recreation Park (1883–1886)

Major league titles
- World Series titles (2): 1980; 2008
- NL pennants (8): 1915; 1950; 1980; 1983; 1993; 2008; 2009; 2022
- NL East division titles (13): 1976; 1977; 1978; 1980; 1983; 1993; 2007; 2008; 2009; 2010; 2011; 2024; 2025
- Wild card berths (3): 2022; 2023; 2026

Front office
- Principal owner: John Middleton
- President: John Middleton (CEO)
- President of baseball operations: Dave Dombrowski
- General manager: Preston Mattingly
- Manager: Don Mattingly
- Mascot: Phillie Phanatic
- Website: mlb.com/phillies

The Philadelphia Phillies are an American professional baseball team based in Philadelphia. The Phillies compete in Major League Baseball (MLB) as a member club of the National League (NL) East Division. Since 2004, the team's home stadium has been Citizens Bank Park, located in the South Philadelphia Sports Complex.

The National League approved a new franchise for Philadelphia to begin play in 1883, at its annual meeting in Providence on December 7, 1882. The team has continuously been known as the Phillies since their founding. The Phillies have won two World Series championships (against the Kansas City Royals in 1980 and the Tampa Bay Rays in 2008) and eight National League pennants (the first of which came in 1915). The team has played 123 consecutive seasons since the first modern World Series and 143 seasons since its inaugural 1883 campaign. As of the end of the 2026 season, the Phillies have played 21,972 games, with a regular season record of 10,391–11,466–115 (.475).

The resignation of the Worcester and Troy franchises from the National League after the 1882 season created openings in the eight-team circuit for two new franchises, which were granted to New York and Philadelphia. The team has played at several stadiums in the city, including Recreation Park (1883–1886), the Baker Bowl (1887–1938), Shibe Park (later renamed Connie Mack Stadium in 1953, in honor of longtime Philadelphia Athletics manager Connie Mack) (1938–1970), Veterans Stadium (1971–2003), and now at Citizens Bank Park (2004–present). Partly because of the team's longevity, the Phillies were the first American sports franchise to amass over 10,000 losses. A plurality of those losses came in a 31-year period from 1918 to 1948 in which they managed only one winning season. Yet, the Phillies are one of only ten teams (the ninth team to reach the mark) to also have won over 10,000 games in their history.

With their first championship in 1980, the Phillies were the last of the 16 pre-expansion teams to win a World Series. Since the start of the divisional era in 1969, however, the Phillies have emerged as one of MLB's most successful teams, making 17 playoff appearances and winning 13 division titles (including five consecutive divisional titles between 2007 and 2011), six National League pennants, and two World Series championships.

Over the team's history since 1883, 33 Phillies players have been inducted into the Baseball Hall of Fame. Hall of Fame third baseman Mike Schmidt is widely considered the franchise's greatest player of all time.

The Philadelphia Phillies' Triple-A affiliate is the Lehigh Valley IronPigs, who play at Coca-Cola Park in Allentown, Pennsylvania. The Double-A affiliate is the Reading Fightin Phils, who play in Reading, Pennsylvania. The Class-A affiliates are the Jersey Shore BlueClaws, who play in Lakewood Township, New Jersey; and the Clearwater Threshers, who play in Clearwater, Florida.

The team's spring training facilities are at BayCare Ballpark in Clearwater, Florida.

== History ==
=== Early years (1883–1904) ===
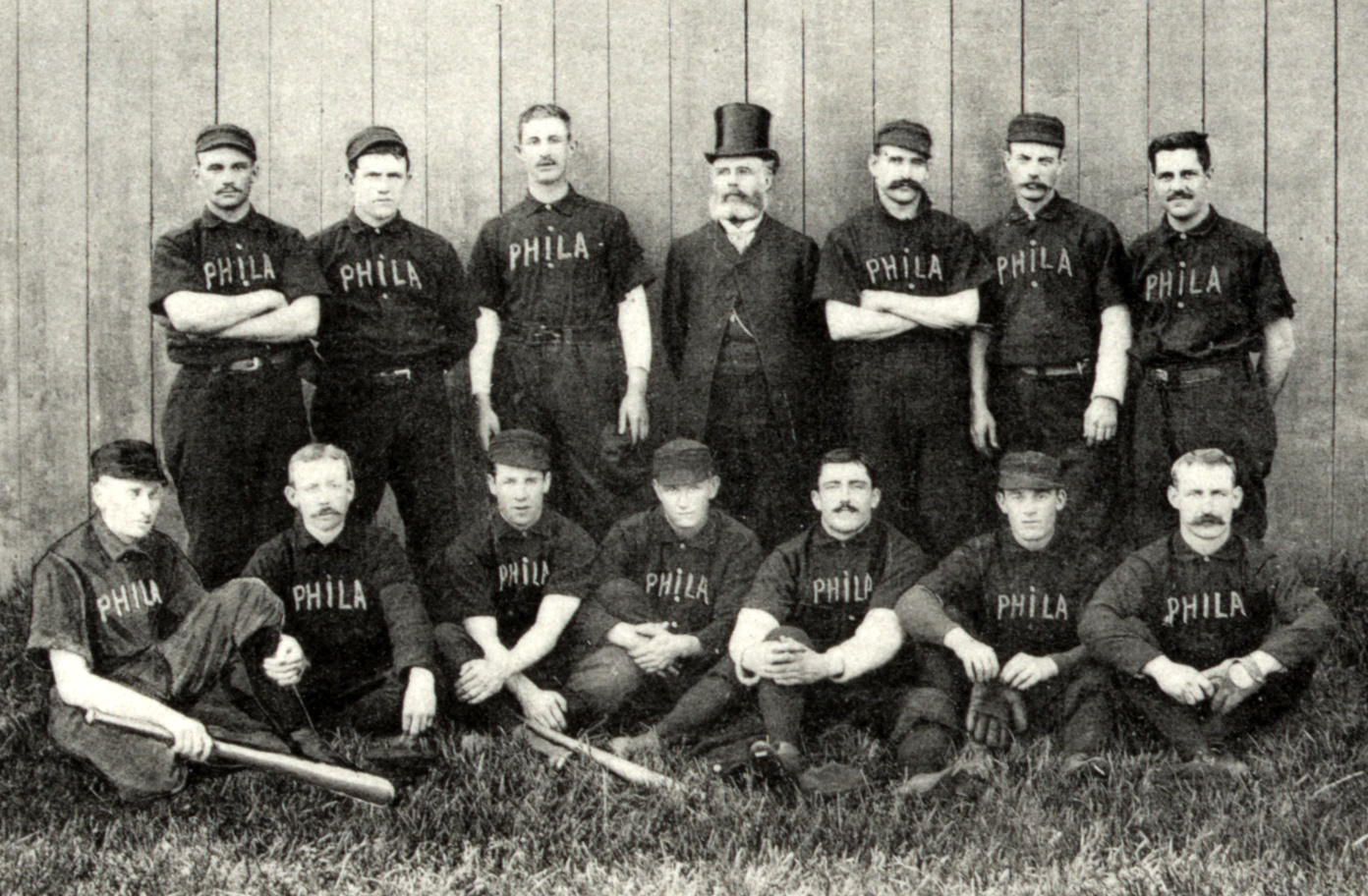
The 1888 Philadelphia Phillies team

In 1883, sporting goods manufacturer Al Reach, a pioneering professional baseball player, and attorney John Rogers won an expansion National League franchise for Philadelphia, one of what is now known as the "Classic Eight" of the league. They were awarded a spot to replace the Worcester baseball team, a franchise that had folded in 1882. The nickname "Phillies" first appeared in The Philadelphia Inquirer on April 3, 1883, in the paper's coverage of an exhibition game and was the team's accepted nickname from the start. This name is one of the longest continually used nicknames in professional sports by a team in the same city. Although many sources (including the Phillies themselves) claim that Reach and Rogers bought the Worcester Brown Stockings and moved them to Philadelphia, all available evidence suggests this is not the case. Significantly, no players from Worcester ended up with the 1883 Phillies.

In 1884, Harry Wright, the former manager of the successful Cincinnati Red Stockings, was recruited as a manager in hopes of reversing the team's fortunes.

In 1887, the team began to play at the newly-constructed Philadelphia Base Ball Grounds (later renamed National League Park and the Baker Bowl). Despite a general improvement from their dismal beginnings, they never seriously contended for the title.

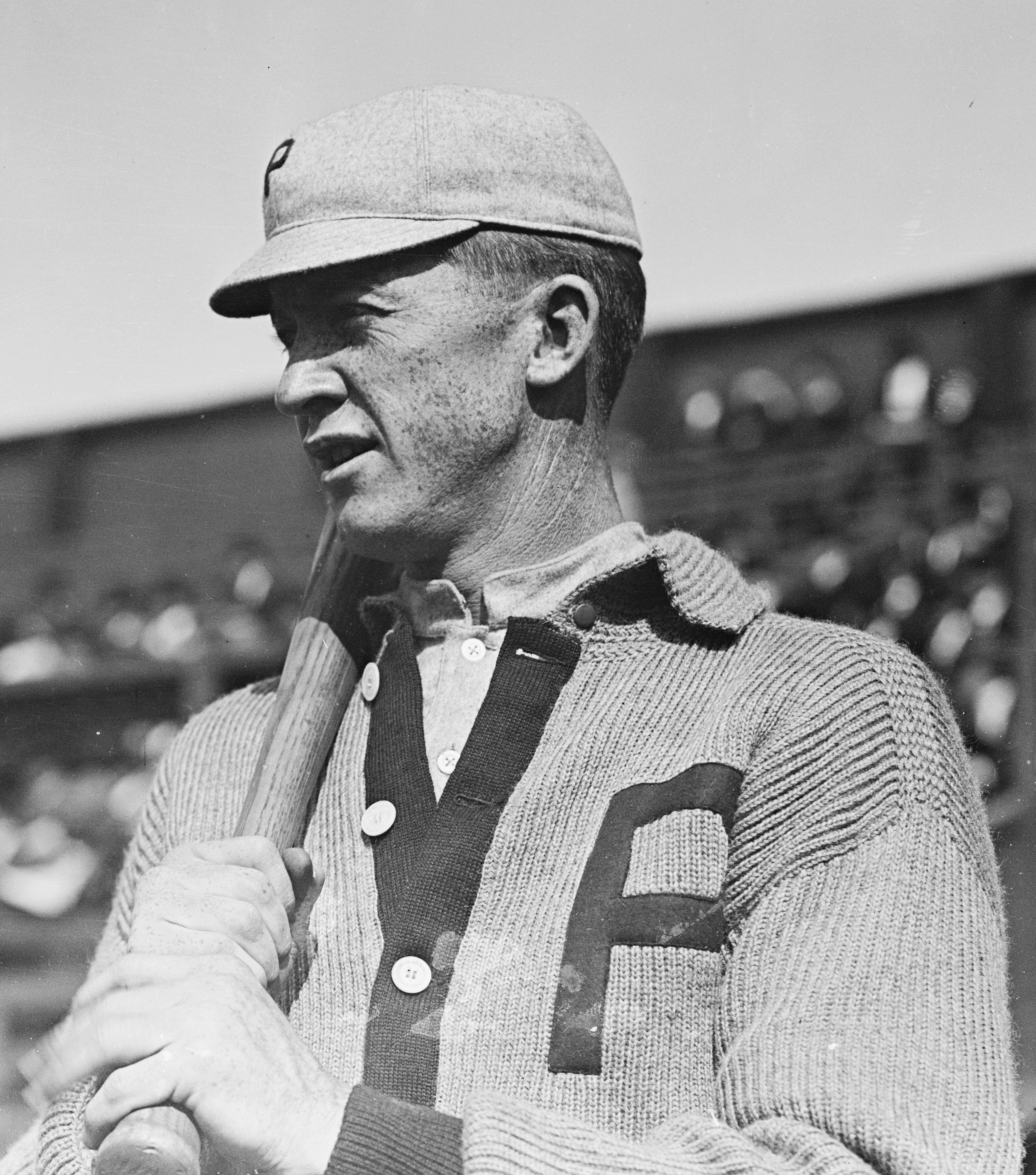
Grover Cleveland Alexander, Phillies pitcher from 1911 to 1917 and again in the 1930 season

The franchise's standout players in the era were Billy Hamilton, Sam Thompson, and Ed Delahanty, who in 1896 tied the major-league record (since tied by several others) with four home runs in a single game. Due to growing disagreements about the direction of the team, Al Reach sold his interest to John Rogers in 1899.

With the birth of the more lucrative American League (AL) in 1901, the Phillies saw many of their better players defect to the upstart league, with a number of players who ending up playing for their crosstown rivals, the Philadelphia Athletics, owned by former Phillies minority owner Ben Shibe. While their former teammates would thrive (the AL's first five batting champions were former Phillies), the remaining squad fared dismally, finishing 46 games out of first place in 1902—the first of three straight years finishing either seventh or eighth.

To add tragedy to folly, a balcony collapsed during a game at the Baker Bowl in 1903, killing 12 and injuring hundreds. Rogers was forced to sell the Phillies to avoid being ruined by an avalanche of lawsuits. In 1904, the team finished with a record of 52–100, making them the first team in franchise history to have lost 100 games.

=== First successes (1905–1917) ===
Beginning in 1905, the Phillies began to see winning seasons on a consistent basis, and the team won their first National League pennant in 1915 thanks to the pitching of Grover Cleveland Alexander and the batting prowess of Gavvy Cravath, who set the 20th century single-season record for home runs with 24. They finished the season with a record of 90–62, seven games ahead of the Boston Braves. The Phillies went up against the Boston Red Sox in the World Series, opening the series at home with a victory. However, the Phillies struggled against strong Red Sox pitching and surrendered the next four games, losing the series four games to one.

The team continued to dominate the National League in 1916 but fell short of capturing a second consecutive pennant as the team finished two and a half games out of first place with a record of 91–62. Alexander won his second consecutive pitching Triple Crown by posting 16 shutouts, which tied the single-season major league record.

In 1917, Alexander was traded to the Chicago Cubs for pitcher Mike Prendegrast and catcher Pickles Dillhoefer after owner William Baker refused to increase his salary. Baker was known for running the Phillies very cheaply; for instance, during much of his tenure, there was only one scout in the entire organization. The Phillies finished the 1917 season in second place with a record of 87–65, ten games behind the New York Giants.

=== Three decades of losing (1918–1948) ===
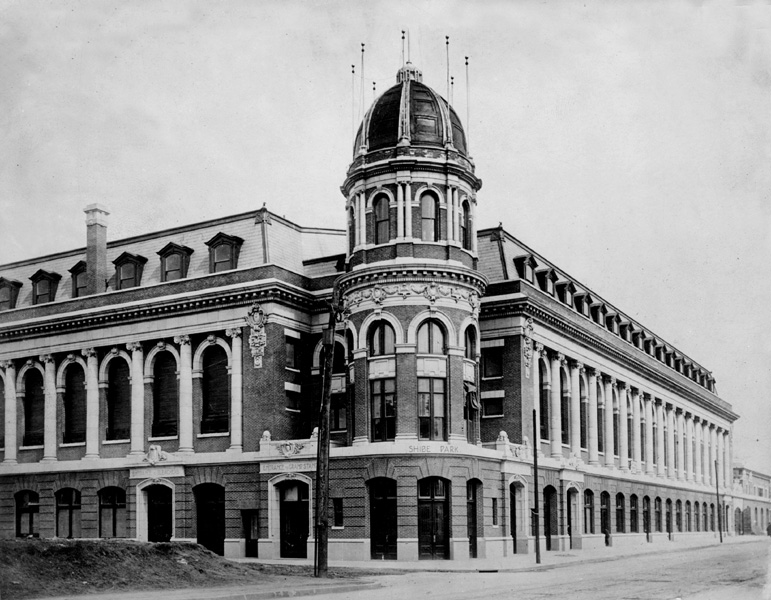
Shibe Park, renamed Connie Mack Stadium in 1953, was the Phillies' home stadium from 1938 to 1970.

The effect of the Grover Cleveland Alexander trade was immediate. In 1918, only three years after winning the pennant, the Phillies finished sixth, 13 games under .500. It was the start of one of the longest streaks of futility in baseball history. From 1918 to 1948, the Phillies had only one winning record, which came in 1932. The team finished higher than sixth only twice, and were never a serious contender past June. During this stretch, they finished in last place a total of 17 times, and had 12 seasons in which they lost at least 100 games. This saddled the franchise with a reputation for failure that dogged it for many years. The team's primary stars during the 1920s and 1930s were outfielders Cy Williams, Lefty O'Doul, and Chuck Klein, who achieved the Triple Crown in 1933.

William Baker died in 1930. He left half his estate to his wife and the other half to longtime team secretary Mae Mallen. Five years earlier, Mallen had married a leather goods and shoe dealer, Gerald Nugent. With the support of Baker's widow, Nugent became team president. Baker's widow died in 1932, leaving Nugent in complete control. Unlike Baker, Nugent badly wanted to build a winning team, however, he did not have the financial means to do so. He was forced to trade what little talent the team had to make ends meet, and often had to use some creative financial methods to field a team at all.

Philadelphia's Baker Bowl proved to be a fertile hitting ground for Phillies opponents. In 1930, the team surrendered 1199 runs, a major-league record still standing today. Once considered one of the finest parks in baseball, it was not well maintained from the 1910s onward. For instance, until 1925, the Phillies used a flock of sheep to trim the grass. Fans were often showered with rust whenever one of Klein's home runs hit girders. The entire right field grandstand collapsed in 1926, forcing the Phillies to move to the Athletics' Shibe Park (five blocks west on Lehigh Avenue from Baker Bowl) for 1927. The Phillies tried to move to Shibe Park on a permanent basis as tenants of the Athletics. However, Baker Bowl owner Charles W. Murphy refused to let the Phillies out of their lease. He finally relented in 1938, and only then because the city had threatened to condemn the dilapidated park. Despite the move, attendance rarely topped 3,000 a game.

The lowest point came in 1941, when the Phillies finished with a 43–111 record, setting a franchise record for losses in a season. A year later, they needed an advance from the league just to go to spring training. Nugent realized he did not have enough money to operate the team in 1943, and put it up for sale.

After lumber baron William D. Cox purchased the team with a group of investors for $190,000 and a $50,000 note on March 15, 1943, the Phillies rose out of last place for the first time in five years. As a result, the fan base and attendance at home games increased. Eventually, Cox revealed that he had been betting on the Phillies, and he was banned from baseball by commissioner Kenesaw Mountain Landis on November 23, 1943. The new owner, Bob Carpenter Sr., scion of the Delaware-based duPont family, bought the team with his son for an estimated $400,000 that same day. Carpenter Sr. subsequently named his son, Bob Carpenter Jr., team president. The Carpenters sought to polish the team's image and way of doing business.

==== Philadelphia Blue Jays (1944–1949) ====
Under the new Carpenter ownership, the team held a fan contest soliciting a new team nickname before the 1944 season. Management chose "Blue Jays", the fan submission of Elizabeth Crooks, who received a $100 war bond as compensation. The Phillies would later claim in the 2000s that the Blue Jays moniker was never official, however, news reports in 1944 note that Phillies management said that the Blue Jays name was as an official "additional nickname", meaning that the team had two official nicknames simultaneously, the Phillies and the Blue Jays.

The Phillies' official adoption of Blue Jays as a second official nickname led to a dispute with Johns Hopkins University in Baltimore, whose athletic teams used the Blue Jays nickname. Wilson Shaffer, the school's athletic director, criticized the Phillies for adopting his university's moniker, and said that Philadelphia should use the blue jay's scientific name instead, being known as the "Philadelphia Cyanocitta Cristata". Similarly, the university's student council, citing the Phillies' long track record of failure, passed a resolution demanding "suitable satisfaction" for what they perceived as theft and sullying of the Blue Jays name. Carpenter Jr. responded by criticizing Johns Hopkins' baseball record and promised to make the students proud of the Blue Jays name by having his Philadelphia baseball team win many games.

The Philadelphia team added three minor league clubs before the start of the 1946 season and named them all Blue Jays: the Class C Salina Blue Jays, Class C Schenectady Blue Jays and Class D Green Bay Blue Jays.

The new Blue Jays moniker was ultimately unpopular, and it was officially dropped by the team in after the 1949 season.

The Blue Jays moniker was later adopted by the Toronto's expansion American League club when it started play in 1977. Coincidentally, those Blue Jays went on to defeat the Phillies in the 1993 World Series.

=== The "Whiz Kids" (1949–1961) ===
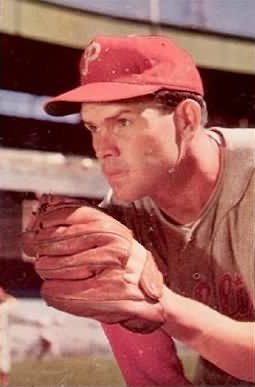
Robin Roberts, Phillies' pitcher from 1948 to 1961

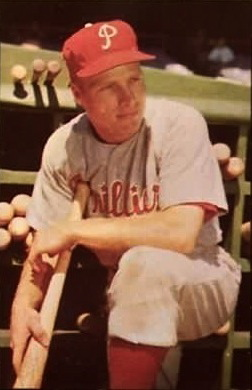
Richie Ashburn, Phillies' center fielder from 1948 to 1959

Like William D. Cox, Bob Carpenter Jr. was not afraid to spend the money it took to build a contender. He immediately started signing young players and invested even more money in the farm system, and the Phillies quickly developed a solid core of young players that included future Hall of Famers Richie Ashburn and Robin Roberts.

Things started coming together for the Phillies in 1949, as they rocketed up the standings to third place with an 81–73 record. Although the season had essentially been a two-team race between Brooklyn and St. Louis, the Phillies still made their first appearance in the first division in 17 years and posted their best record in 32 years. It was also a fitting tribute to Bob Carpenter Sr., who had died in June and left Bob Jr. in full control of the team.

The 1950 Phillies led the National League standings for most of the season and were dubbed the "Whiz Kids". In the final months of the season, a tailspin (triggered by the loss of starting pitcher Curt Simmons to National Guard service) caused the team to lose the next eight of ten games. On the last day of the season, the Phillies hung on to a one-game lead when Dick Sisler's dramatic tenth inning home run against the Brooklyn Dodgers clinched the Phillies' first pennant in 35 years. In the World Series, exhausted from their late-season plunge and victims of poor luck, the Phillies were swept by the New York Yankees in four straight games.

Despite the World Series loss, the pennant win cemented the Phillies' status as the city's favorite baseball team. Philadelphia had been an "A's town" for most of the first half of the 20th century, as, under the command of manager and owner Connie Mack, the Athletics had won five World Series titles and saw much more success than the Phillies. Although the Athletics had begun to decline starting in the 1930s, they continued to trounce the Phillies in attendance. However, by 1950, the Athletics franchise was in turmoil and had not been in pennant contention for several years. Connie Mack was bought out by the Johnson brothers after the 1954 season, and the team subsequently relocated to Kansas City, Missouri. As part of the deal with Johnson brothers, the Phillies bought Shibe Park, where both teams had played since 1938.

Many thought that the "Whiz Kids", with a young core of talented players, would be a force in the league for years to come. However, the team finished with a 73–81 record in 1951 and finished nine and a half games out of first place in 1952, with an 87–67 record. The Phillies managed to end up in third place in 1953 with an 83–71 record, however, they would fail to break .500 from 1954 to 1957.

It became apparent that the flash and determination of the "Whiz Kids" would not return when the team finished last place in the National League from 1958 to 1961. Manager Eddie Sawyer abruptly quit the team after the season opener in 1960, and was replaced by Gene Mauch. The team's competitive futility was highlighted by a record that still stands: in 1961, the Phillies lost 23 games in a row, the worst losing streak in the majors since 1900.

=== Fightin' Phils (1962–1975) ===
Things started to turn around for the team in 1962, when the team finished above .500 for the first time in five years. Gene Mauch was named National League Manager of the Year for the season. The team improved in 1963 when they finished the season with an 87–75 record. There was confidence that the team would soon become contenders for a return to the World Series.

Though legends Richie Ashburn and Robin Roberts were gone, the 1964 Phillies still had younger pitchers Art Mahaffey, Chris Short, and rookie Ray Culp; veterans Jim Bunning and screwballer Jack Baldschun; and fan favorites Cookie Rojas, Johnny Callison, and NL Rookie of the Year Dick Allen. The team started the season meeting the high expectations placed on them. They won ten of their first twelve games, and eventually spent much of the season at or near first place in the National League. On September 20, the Phillies sat at 90–60 on the season, good enough for a lead of 6½ games in the pennant race with 12 games to play. Confidence was so high that the team began selling World Series tickets for games at Connie Mack Stadium. However, in a drastic turn, the Phillies lost 10 games in a row and ultimately finished one game out of first place, losing the pennant to the St. Louis Cardinals. The "Phold of '64" is frequently mentioned as among the worst and most infamous collapses in sports history.

Despite the collapse, one highlight of the 1964 season occurred on Father's Day, when Jim Bunning pitched a perfect game against the New York Mets, the first in Phillies' history. Additionally, Gene Mauch won his second Manager of the Year award.

For the rest of the decade, the team finished no higher than fourth place in the National League standings. In 1969, the Phillies finished fifth in the newly-created NL East division with a record of 63–99.

Starting in the late 1950s, Connie Mack Stadium began deteriorating, and Bob Carpenter Jr. began to pursue a new stadium. Carpenter had never even wanted to buy Connie Mack Stadium in the first place, and was now convinced there was no way he could make money playing there. He sold the park to Philadelphia Eagles' owner Jerry Wolman in 1964, taking a $1 million loss on his purchase of just 10 years earlier. In 1959, Carpenter proposed building a new stadium at Garden State Park Racetrack in the nearby suburb of Cherry Hill, New Jersey, though these plans never came to fruition. Eventually, plans were made to construct a multi-purpose stadium in South Philadelphia, which the Phillies would share with the Eagles. Ground officially broke on the what would become Veterans Stadium in 1967, and would be completed for the 1971 season.

1970 was the Phillies' final season at Connie Mack Stadium. To accompany the upcoming move, the Phillies unveiled a new logo and uniform set. In the final game played at the stadium, they avoided last place by defeating the Montreal Expos, 2–1. When the game was finished, several fans in attendance began to remove items from the ballpark, such as chairs, outfield panels, and baseball equipment from the dugouts.

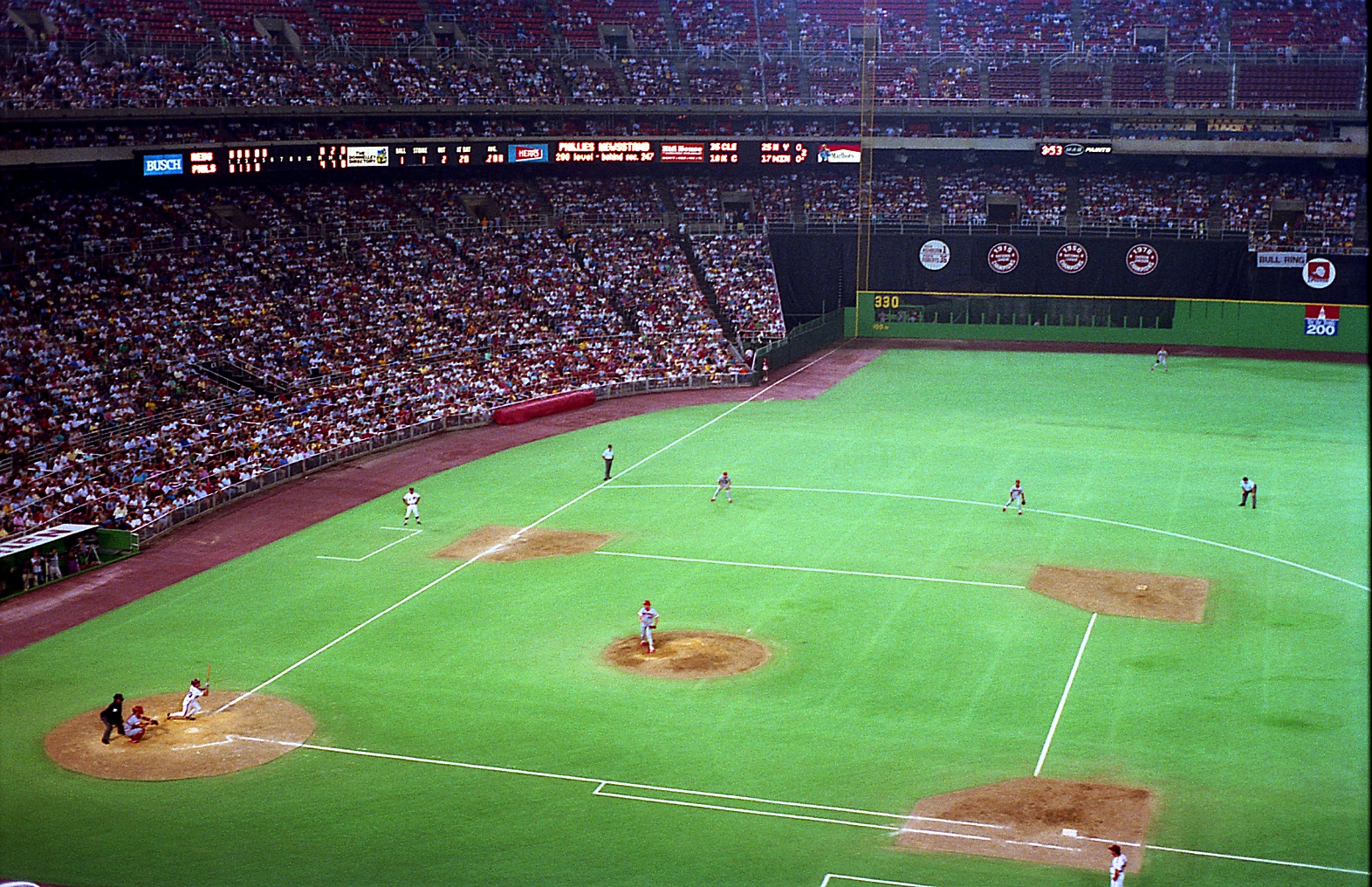
Veterans Stadium, home of the Phillies and Philadelphia Eagles from 1971 to 2003

The 1971 season was the Phillies' inaugural season at the newly-completed Veterans Stadium. The move to the new stadium marked the first time in their history that the team did not play in North Philadelphia. The new stadium, along with nearby John F. Kennedy Stadium and the Spectrum, established the South Philadelphia Sports Complex.

On June 23, 1971, pitcher Rick Wise both hurled a no-hitter and hit two home runs against the Cincinnati Reds, though this would be one of the only major highlights of the season, as the Phillies finished 67–95 and in last place once again. However, this also was the first season that legendary announcer Harry Kalas was part of the Phillies broadcasting team.

In 1972, the Phillies finished as the worst team in baseball, but newly-acquired pitcher Steve Carlton, who won nearly half their games (27 of 59 team wins), was awarded his first National League Cy Young Award. During the season, Bob Carpenter Jr. retired and passed team ownership down to his son, Ruly.

Over the next three seasons, under the command of new manager Danny Ozark, the Phillies would gradually improve on their win total, winning 71 games in 1973, 80 in 1974, and 86 in 1975. These seasons were highlighted by the development and growth of a new core of young players, including third baseman Mike Schmidt, shortstop Larry Bowa, outfielder Greg Luzinski, and catcher Bob Boone. Combined with the existing talent of Steve Carlton, the Phillies were expected to be title contenders for the next several years.

=== Glory days (1976–1983) ===
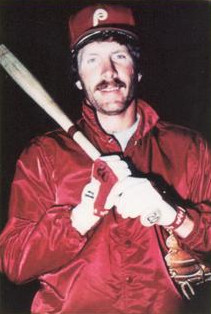
Mike Schmidt

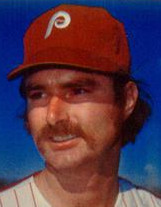
Steve Carlton

Third baseman Mike Schmidt and pitcher Steve Carlton, both Hall of Fame inductees, helped the Phillies to five NL East titles, two NL pennants, and the franchise's first World Series championship in 1980.

In 1976, the Phillies went 101–61 on the season, winning 100 games for the first time in franchise history and claiming their first-ever NL East division title. They returned to the postseason for the first time in 26 years, facing the Cincinnati Reds in the National League Championship Series (NLCS), but were swept in three games. In 1977, the Phillies posted an identical record of 101–61 and won their second straight division title. The regular season was highlighted by Steve Carlton winning his second NL Cy Young Award. They returned to the NLCS and faced the Los Angeles Dodgers, but were defeated in four games. In 1978, the Phillies went 90–72 and narrowly claimed their third straight division title. However, their season ended once again in the NLCS as they were defeated by the Dodgers in four games.

After a third-straight playoff disappointment in 1978, the Phillies made a major move by signing star hitter Pete Rose. Although he was 37 at the time of the signing, Rose was widely seen as a seasoned veteran with prior postseason success who could be the final piece needed for the Phillies to win a World Series. However, the 1979 season proved unlucky for the Phillies. Widespread injuries and a lack of pitching depth plagued the team throughout the season. On August 31, 1979, with the team sitting at 65–67 on the season, manager Danny Ozark was fired and replaced with Dallas Green. While the Phillies ended the season 19–11 under Green, they still finished in fourth place in the division with a record of 84–78.

==== 1980 World Series champions ====
In 1980, the Phillies returned to the postseason by posting a 91–71 record and winning their fourth division title in five seasons. Mike Schmidt became the first Phillies player in franchise history to win the Most Valuable Player award, and Steve Carlton won his third Cy Young award. The Phillies met the Houston Astros in the NLCS, seeking to avenge their three consecutive series losses from 1976 to 1978. The series would become one of the most memorable playoff series in MLB history, with four of the five games needing extra innings. The Phillies fell behind two games to one, but battled back to squeeze past the Astros on a 10th-inning game-winning hit by center fielder Garry Maddox in the deciding Game 5. The Phillies celebrated their first NL pennant in 30 years.

Facing the Kansas City Royals in the World Series, the Phillies won the series in six games, claiming their first World Series championship in franchise history thanks to the timely hitting of Pete Rose and World Series MVP Mike Schmidt, who provided game-winning hits in Game 2 and the clinching Game 6. This final game was also significant because it remains the most-watched game in World Series history with a television audience of 54.9 million viewers. The Phillies became the last of the 16 teams that made up the major leagues from 1903 to 1960 to win a World Series.

After their series win, owner Ruly Carpenter sold the team for $32.5 million to a group that was headed by longtime Phillies executive Bill Giles.

The Phillies returned to the playoffs in 1981 after finishing first in the NL East for the first half of the regular season, which was split into two due to a players' strike. They met the Montreal Expos in the first-ever National League Division Series (NLDS), but were defeated in five games. Mike Schmidt won his second consecutive NL MVP award that year, and manager Dallas Green departed after the season to become the general manager of the Chicago Cubs. In 1982, the team finished three games behind the St. Louis Cardinals in the division, narrowly missing the playoffs. However, Steve Carlton captured his fourth career NL Cy Young Award with 23 wins on the year.

The 1983 Phillies got off to a slow 43–42 start, but after replacing manager Pat Corrales with then-general manager Paul Owens, the team finished with a 90–72 record and clinched their fifth division title in eight seasons. They would meet the Dodgers in the NLCS for the third time in seven seasons, though, unlike the prior meetings, the Phillies would defeat the Dodgers in four games. In the World Series against the Baltimore Orioles, the Phillies won the opening game, but lost the next four straight to lose the series. The 1983 team is most famously known as the "Wheeze Kids" (a play on the 1950s "Whiz Kids"), a nickname given to them by media outlets due to the team featuring several aging veterans as key players. John Denny was named the NL Cy Young Award winner on the season.

=== Years of struggles (1984–2000) ===
The 1984 season marked the beginning of the end of the most successful era of Phillies baseball to that point. The team finished fourth in the NL East with a record of 81–81, failing to post a winning record for the first time since 1974. While Mike Schmidt still remained a dominant force on the team by leading the National League in both home runs and runs batted in, it was apparent that the aging core of the team would no longer be able to reach the successes of prior seasons.

The 1986 season would mark the only year the Phillies would post a winning record for the remainder of the 1980s. Despite parting ways with star pitcher Steve Carlton, Mike Schmidt would lead the National League in home runs and runs batted in and also won his third National League MVP award, sixth Silver Slugger award, and tenth Gold Glove. However, the 86-win Phillies would finish with a seemingly-insurmountable 21.5 game deficit behind the 108-win New York Mets.

In 1987, closer Steve Bedrosian was named the NL Cy Young Award winner. The 1988 and 1989 seasons saw the Phillies finish in last place and eclipse the 90-loss mark for the first time since 1973. Midway through the 1989 season, Mike Schmidt retired abruptly after 18 seasons with the team. At the time of his retirement, Schmidt was the last player remaining on the team that was a member of the 1980 championship team. In 1990, the Phillies continued their struggles with a 77–85 record, though the season was highlighted by pitcher Terry Mulholland throwing a no-hitter on August 15.

During this period, the Phillies often struggled to attract more than 25,000 people to Veterans Stadium, which had the largest capacity in the National League at the time (over 62,000 seats). Even crowds of 40,000 were swallowed up by the cavernous environment. In 1992, the Phillies unveiled a new logo and uniform set, replacing the maroon color set with a more classic red and blue look, a style similar to those used during the days of the "Whiz Kids".

==== Macho Row (1993–1995) ====
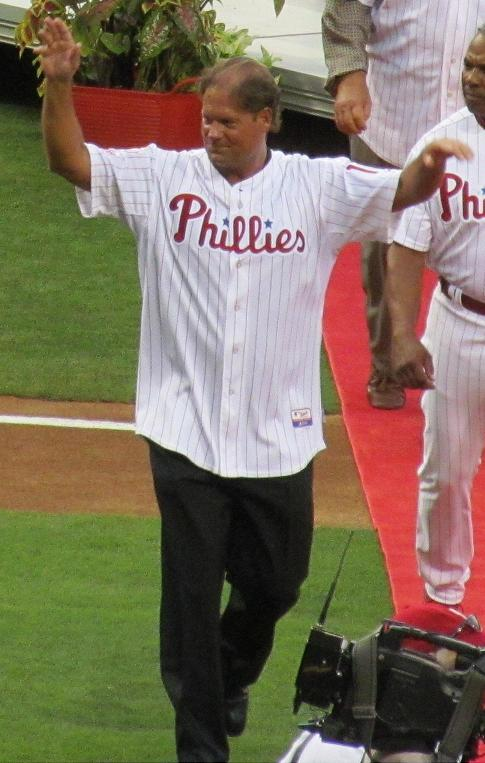
Darren Daulton, Phillies' catcher in 1983 and again from 1985 to 1997

With the Phillies coming off six consecutive losing season, expectations remained low coming into the 1993 season. However, with stars such as Darren Daulton, John Kruk, Lenny Dykstra, and Curt Schilling, the team orchestrated an unexpected turnaround. The team began the season 17–5 and powered their way to a 97–65 record and an NL East division title. The Phillies' major contributors on offense were Dykstra, Kruk, rookie Kevin Stocker, and Jim Eisenreich, all of whom hit over .300 for the season. Their pitching staff was led by 16-game winners Curt Schilling and Tommy Greene. Each member of the rotation posted at least 10 wins, while the bullpen was led by elder statesman Larry Andersen and closer Mitch "Wild Thing" Williams, who notched 43 saves and a 3.34 ERA. The team was nicknamed "Macho Row" for the "shaggy", "unkempt", and "dirty" look that several of the players sported. Their unique character endeared them to fans, and attendance reached a record high the following season.

In the NLCS, the Phillies upset the Atlanta Braves in six games to earn their fifth NL pennant in franchise history and their first in ten years. In the World Series, they would face the defending champion Toronto Blue Jays, battling with them to six games before ending in a heartbreaking finish when Blue Jays outfielder Joe Carter hit a series-clinching walk-off home run off of Mitch Williams.

The 1994–95 Major League Baseball strike was a blow to attendance and on-field success, as was the arrival of the Atlanta Braves in the division due to league realignment. The Macho Row squad was unable to replicate their successes from 1993, and several players from the pennant-winning team would depart or be traded away in the subsequent seasons.

For the remainder of the 1990s, the Phillies would finish with losing records. 1996 saw the debut of heavily-touted third baseman Scott Rolen, who would go on to win the NL Rookie of the Year award in the following season.

In 2000, plans began to develop for a new stadium to replace the aging Veterans Stadium. As was the growing trend at the time across MLB, the Phillies had interest in building a new ballpark in the downtown area of Philadelphia, a contrast to their existing site at the South Philadelphia Sports Complex. Then-Philadelphia mayor John F. Street proposed a site in Chinatown for a new ballpark the spring of 2000, but the plan was met with significant opposition from local residents, and the Phillies ultimately settled on constructing a new stadium adjacent to Veterans Stadium in the South Philadelphia Sports Complex.

=== Building a contender (2001–2006) ===
In 2001, former Phillie Larry Bowa was hired as manager, and immediately led the Phillies to an 86–76 record, their first winning season since 1993. They spent most of the first half of the season in first place, and traded first place with the Braves for most of the second half. In the end, they finished two games out of first, but Bowa was still named NL Manager of the Year for his efforts.

The 2002 season saw the departure of Scott Rolen via a midseason trade after Rolen had reportedly grown discontent with the Phillies' low spending and perceived lack of urgency to win. Following the 2002 season, the Phillies sought to improve their public image and demonstrate to fans that the team was committed toward more spending. General manager Ed Wade made major moves in the offseason, first by signing star first baseman Jim Thome in what was considered the first major free agent signing by the team in years, and also adding infielder David Bell and pitcher Kevin Millwood.

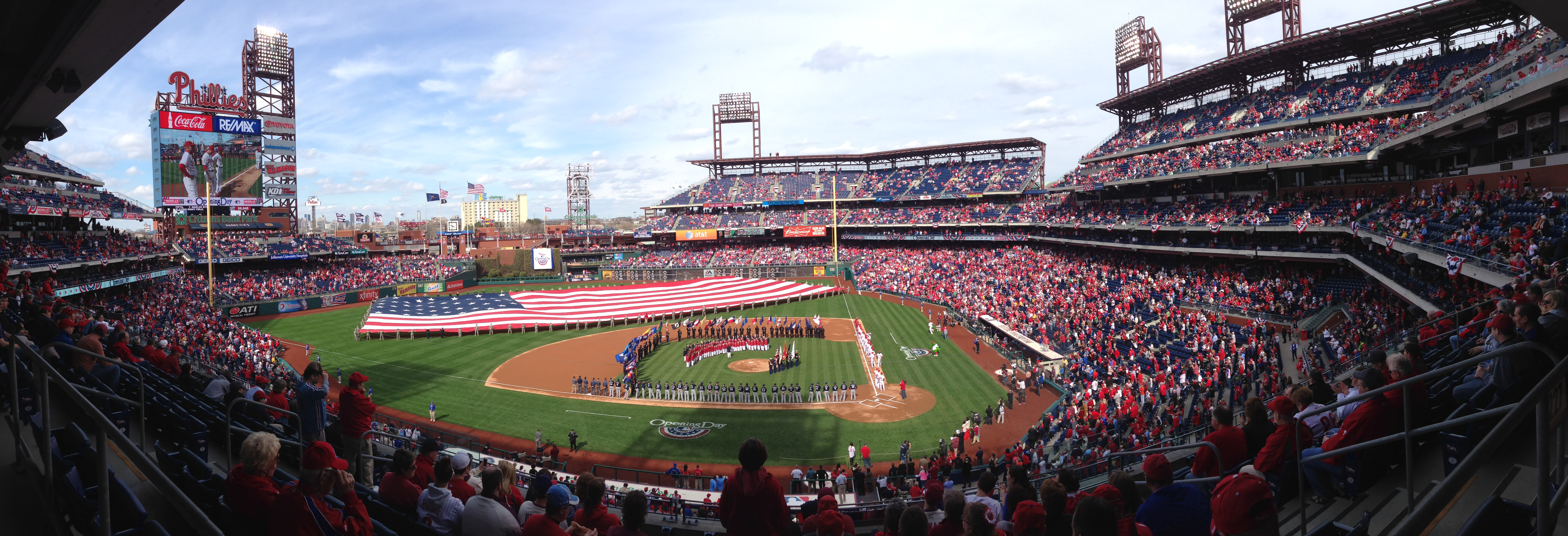
Citizens Bank Park, home field of the Philadelphia Phillies since 2004

Despite the additions, the Phillies were unable to produce a playoff berth, finishing 86–76 in both 2003 and 2004. The 2003 season was the 33rd and final one for the Phillies at Veterans Stadium, as their new stadium, Citizens Bank Park, was completed and opened for the 2004 season.

Manager Larry Bowa was fired at the end of the 2004 season and replaced by Charlie Manuel for the 2005 season. In Manuel's first season, the Phillies finished 88–74, but finished just one game behind the Houston Astros for a wild card berth. Despite missing the playoffs, there was a positive future outlook for the team given the development of a new core of young players including Jimmy Rollins, Pat Burrell, Chase Utley, Ryan Howard, and Cole Hamels, all of whom were drafted by the team between 1996 and 2002. After the season, general manager Ed Wade was replaced by Pat Gillick.

The 2006 season continued the growth and development of the Phillies' new core of young players. First baseman Ryan Howard won the NL MVP award after hitting 59 home runs, a franchise record that still stands as of 2026. However, the Phillies finished 85–77 and again narrowly missed out on a wild card berth.

=== The golden era (2007–2011) ===
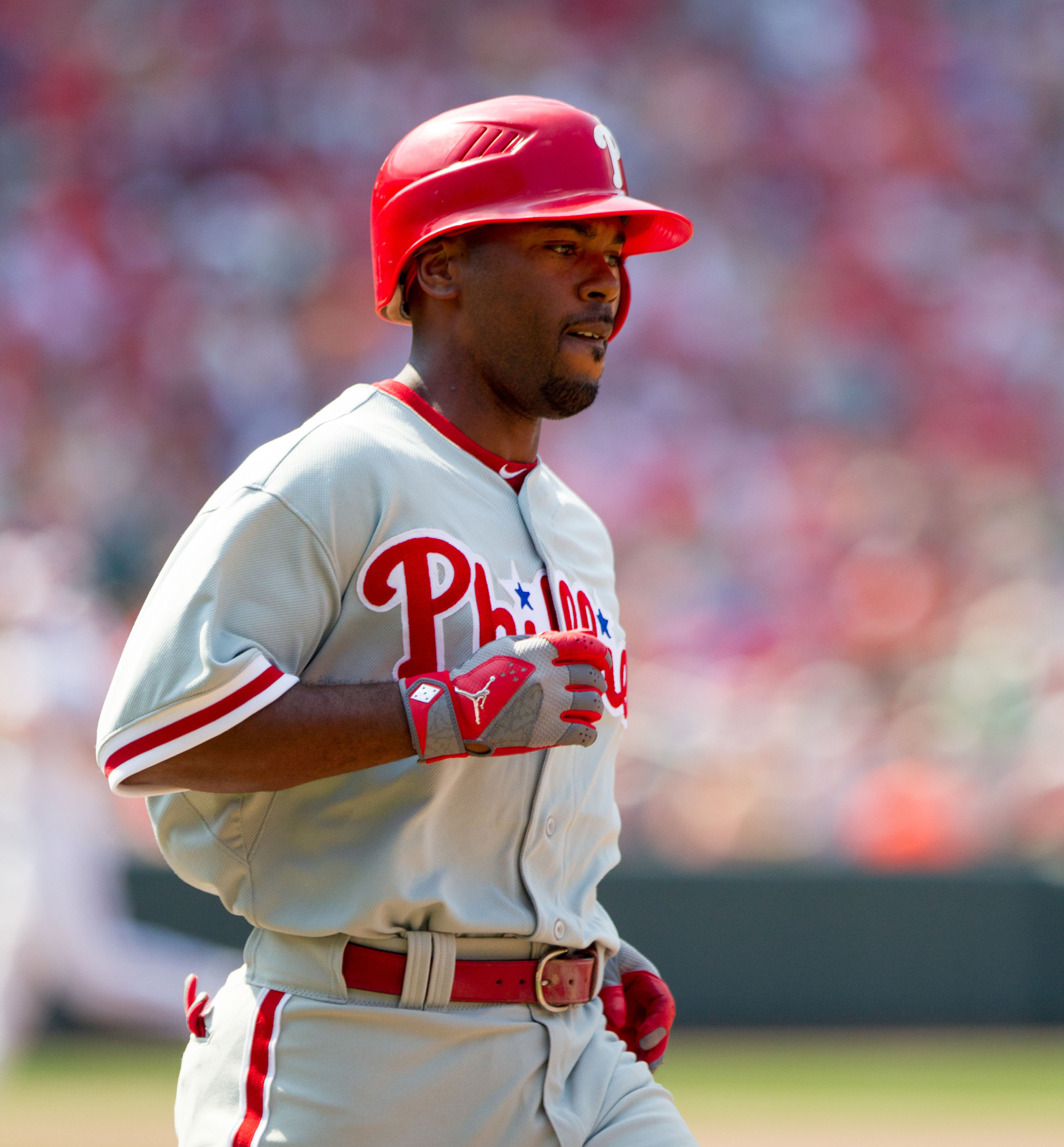
Jimmy Rollins

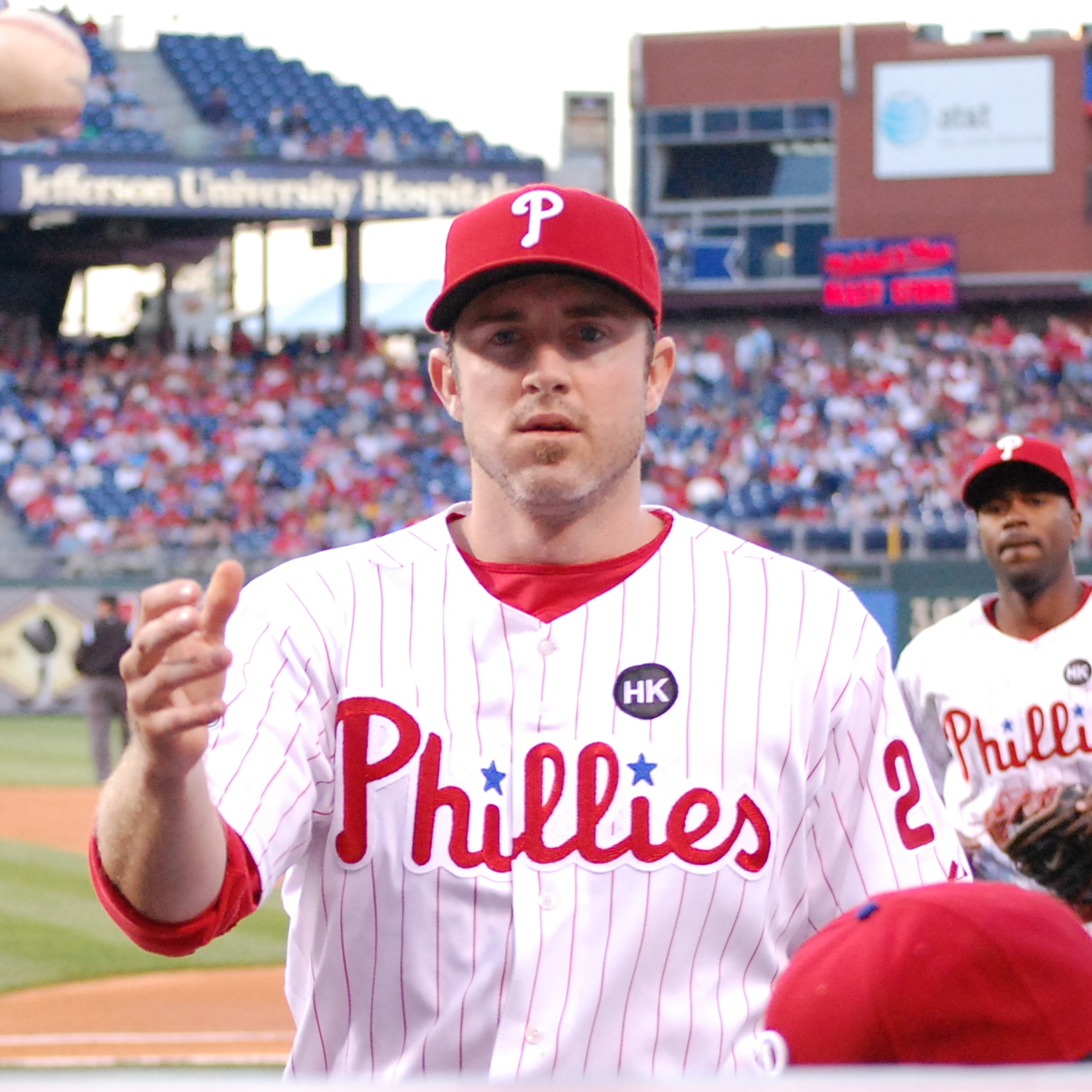
Chase Utley

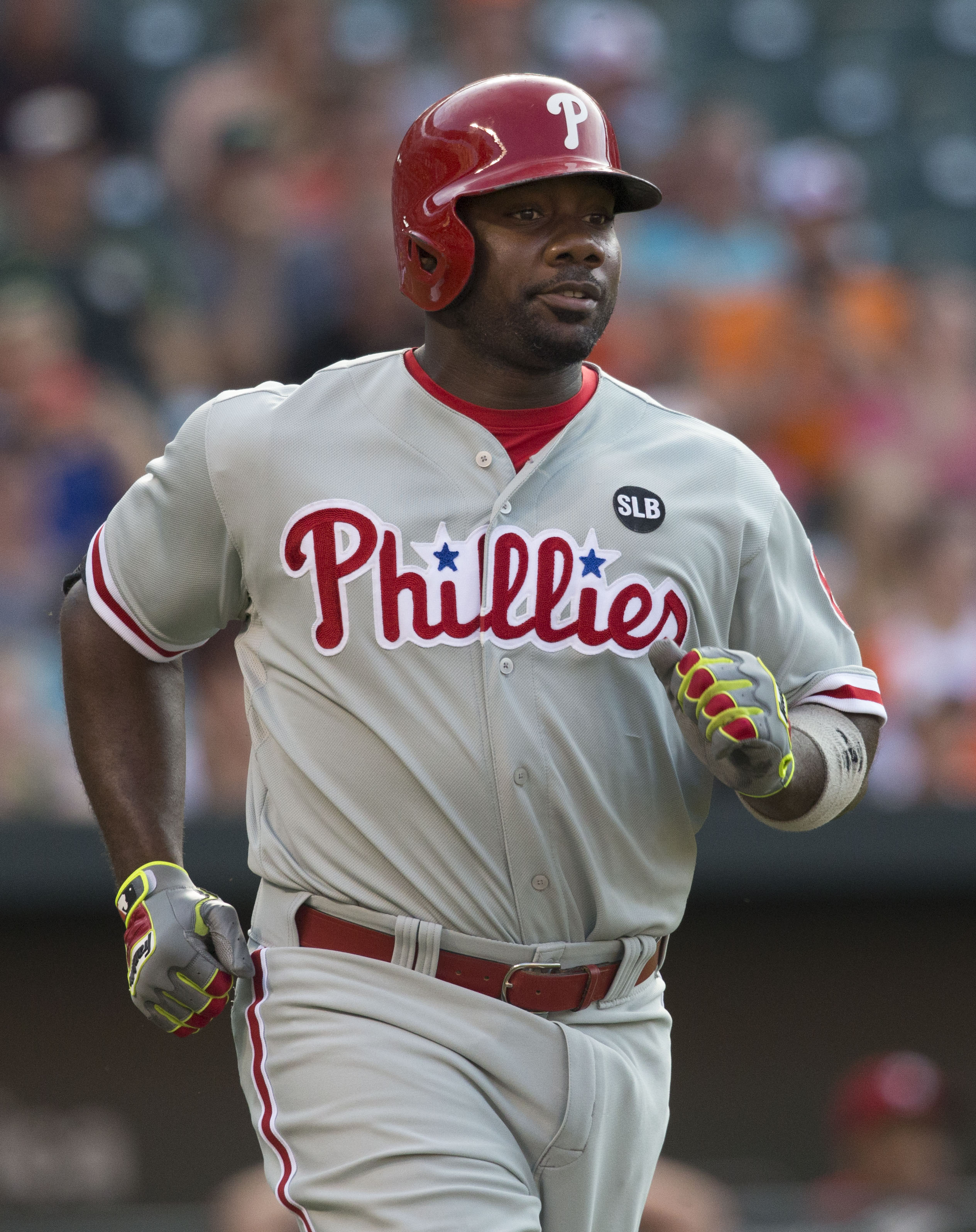
Ryan Howard

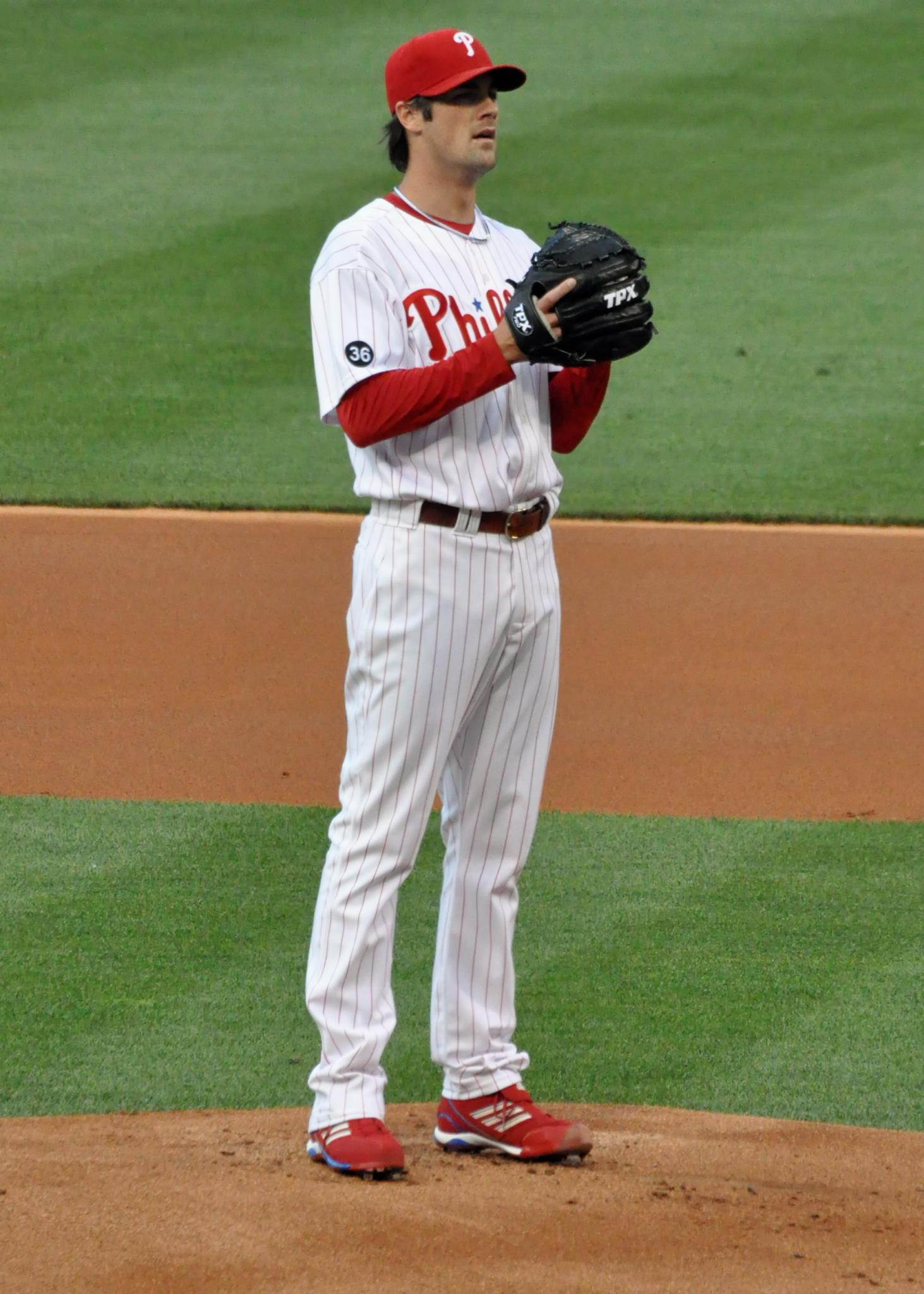
Cole Hamels

Major contributors to the Phillies' 2007 to 2011 teams included shortstop Jimmy Rollins, second baseman Chase Utley, first baseman Ryan Howard, and pitcher Cole Hamels. All four players were drafted and developed by the franchise in the late 1990s and early 2000s.

The Phillies began the 2007 season with expectations that they would contend for the NL East title. Despite stellar seasons from second baseman Chase Utley and shortstop Jimmy Rollins (the latter would go on to win the NL MVP award after achieving the 20–20–20 mark), the Phillies found themselves seven games back from the New York Mets with only 17 games left in the season. In a major turn of events, the Mets went on to suffer a late-season collapse, while the Phillies won 13 of their last 17 games, allowing them to clinch the division on the final day of the season. It was the Phillies' first division title and postseason appearance since 1993. Despite the thrilling finish, the 2007 regular season was also marked by a piece of futility, as the franchise became the first in MLB history to lose 10,000 games all-time.

In the postseason, the Phillies met the wild-card Colorado Rockies in the NLDS, but were swept in three games. After the 2007 season, the Phillies acquired closer Brad Lidge through a trade with the Houston Astros.

==== 2008 World Series champions ====
Entering the 2008 season, the Phillies were named by media as favorites to repeat as NL East champions. The division race would ultimately become a back-and-forth battle between the Phillies and Mets for much of the season, and in a move to bolster their starting rotation in preparation for the pennant race, the Phillies traded three minor league players to the Athletics for starting pitcher Joe Blanton on July 17. The Phillies were ultimately able to win their second straight title thanks to another strong September where they won 13 of their final 16 games, finishing the regular season with a 92–70 record.

In the NLDS, the Phillies defeated the Milwaukee Brewers in four games to clinch their first playoff series win since 1993. In the NLCS, they defeated the Los Angeles Dodgers in five games to advance to the World Series. Facing the Tampa Bay Rays, the Phillies quickly jumped out to a 3–1 series lead. In Game 5, with the score tied 2–2, play was suspended for nearly 48 hours due to persistent rainstorms in the Philadelphia area, marking the first time a World Series game had been suspended mid-game. After play resumed, the Phillies took the lead, and closer Brad Lidge, who was perfect on the season in save opportunities, secured his 48th save to clinch the second World Series championship in franchise history. Pitcher Cole Hamels, who had been named NLCS MVP, was also named World Series MVP.

Pat Gillick retired as general manager after the 2008 season and was succeeded by one of his assistants, Rubén Amaro Jr. After adding outfielder Raúl Ibañez to replace the departed Pat Burrell, the Phillies retained the majority of their core players for the 2009 season. In July, they signed three-time Cy Young Award winner Pedro Martínez and acquired 2008 AL Cy Young winner Cliff Lee before the trade deadline. The Phillies would go on to finish with a 93–69 record and clinch a third consecutive NL East title for the first time since the 1976–78 seasons.

In a playoff rematch from 2007, the Phillies matched up with the Colorado Rockies in the NLDS, but this time defeated them in four games. They faced the Dodgers in the NLCS for the second straight year, and again defeated them in five games, with Ryan Howard being named NLCS MVP. For the first time in franchise history, the Phillies had won back-to-back National League pennants. In the World Series against the New York Yankees, Chase Utley tied the record for most home runs in a single World Series with five, but the Phillies were ultimately unable to win a second straight championship as they lost in six games. After the season, in recognition of the team's recent accomplishments and organizational turnaround from years prior, Baseball America named the Phillies its Organization of the Year.

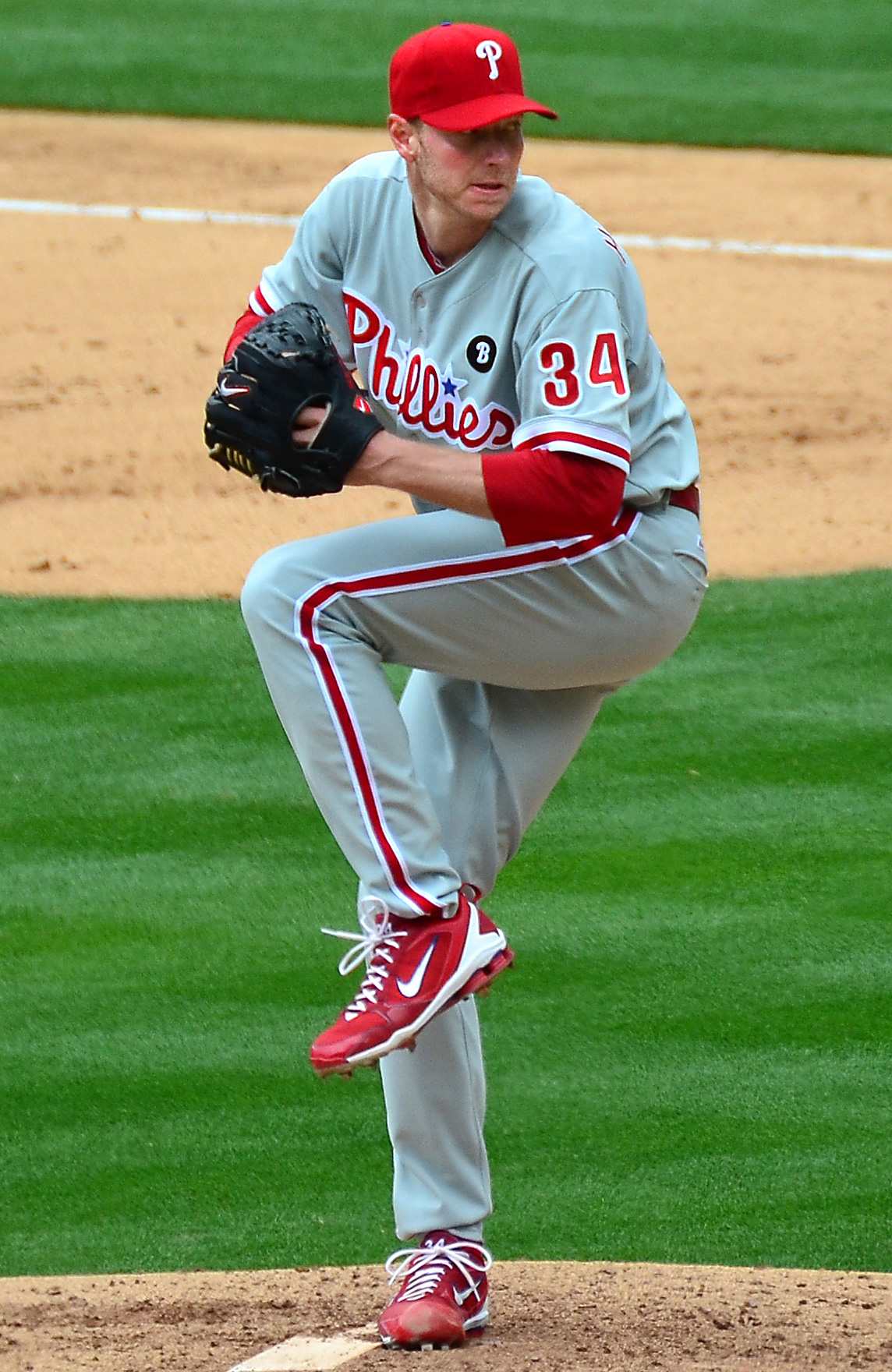
Roy Halladay, Phillies' pitcher from 2010 to 2013 and a 2019 Hall of Fame inductee

On December 16, 2009, the Phillies made two major blockbuster moves, acquiring starting pitcher Roy Halladay from the Toronto Blue Jays for three minor-league prospects, then trading Cliff Lee to the Seattle Mariners for three prospects. As the 2010 season began, Roy Halladay's impact was almost immediate. On May 29, he pitched a perfect game against the Florida Marlins, the second perfect game in franchise history.^{[d]} Halladay would go on to finish the season with a 2.44 ERA, 21 wins, and would be named the NL Cy Young Award winner.

Despite Roy Halladay's successes, the Phillies encountered struggles in the first half of the 2010 season, largely due to a rash of significant injuries to key players. After dropping seven games behind the Atlanta Braves on July 21, the Phillies finished the second half of the season strong, largely thanks to the acquisition of pitcher Roy Oswalt and another successful September where the team posted a 20–5 record. They finished the season 97–65 and won their fourth consecutive NL East title.

The Phillies met the Cincinnati Reds in the NLDS and swept them in three games, with the highlight of the series coming in Game 1, where Roy Halladay, in his first career postseason start, pitched the second no-hitter in MLB postseason history. Halladay's no-hitter was also the fifth time a pitcher threw two no-hitters in the same season, and was also the first time that one of the two occurred in the postseason. In the NLCS, the Phillies fell to the eventual World Series champion San Francisco Giants in six games.

Before the start of the 2011 season, the Phillies signed pitcher Cliff Lee to a five-year deal, bringing him back to the team and forming a formidable starting rotation of Lee, Roy Halladay, Cole Hamels, Roy Oswalt, and Joe Blanton (Vance Worley was also placed in the rotation when Blanton suffered an injury). The team's starting rotation combined for a win–loss record of 71–38 and an ERA of 2.86, the best in the majors that year. It has been regarded by analysts as one of the best starting rotations ever assembled. Halladay, Hamels, Lee, and Oswalt were dubbed two nicknames by fans and media: the "Phantastic Phour" and the "Four Aces". On September 17, 2011, the Phillies clinched their fifth consecutive NL East title, and on September 28, in the final game of the season, the team set a franchise record for wins in a season with 102 by beating the Atlanta Braves in 13 innings, denying their division rivals a potential wild card berth.

By denying the Braves a playoff spot, this meant the Phillies would instead play the wild-card St. Louis Cardinals in the NLDS. Despite the Phillies having 12 more regular season wins than St. Louis and being heavily favored to make the World Series, the Cardinals upset the Phillies in five games and would instead go on to win the 2011 World Series. To make matters worse for the Phillies, the series itself ended on a play where Ryan Howard grounded out and tore his Achilles while attempting to run to first base.

=== End of an era (2012–2018) ===
Despite the unexpected end to the prior season, the 2012 Phillies were still picked by many analysts to continue their run of success. However, with both Ryan Howard and Chase Utley missing the beginning of the season to recover from injuries, the Phillies struggled through the first months, playing .500 ball before slumping through a 9–19 stretch in June. With any hope dimming, the Phillies traded key players Shane Victorino and Joe Blanton to the Los Angeles Dodgers, and Hunter Pence to the San Francisco Giants, before the trade deadline. The Phillies would finish the season with an 81–81 record and miss the postseason for the first time in six years.

By the middle of the 2013 season, it became clear that the Phillies' aging core was on the decline. On August 16, 2013, with the team's record at 53–68, the Phillies fired manager Charlie Manuel after nine seasons with the team. As of 2026, Manuel remains the winningest manager in franchise history with an overall record of 780–636. Third base coach Ryne Sandberg was promoted to interim manager, and the Phillies finished with a record of 73–89, their first losing season since 2002. In the offseason, pitcher Roy Halladay retired from baseball.

The 2014 season saw more of the same struggles for the Phillies, though one of the few bright spots was a September 1 game against the Atlanta Braves when starter Cole Hamels and relievers Jake Diekman, Ken Giles, and Jonathan Papelbon pitched the first combined no-hitter in franchise history. The team could not gain momentum during the season and finished last in the NL East, the first time they had done so since 2000. During the off-season, Jimmy Rollins waived his no-trade clause and was traded to the Los Angeles Dodgers, while Cliff Lee pitched his last game and was sidelined for the entire 2015 season due to injury.

In 2015, attendance began to drop as the team showed little improvement and it was clear that the final remnants of the 2008 championship team would soon be departing. On June 26, with the team sitting at 26–48, Ryne Sandberg resigned as manager, and was replaced by bench coach Pete Mackanin as interim manager. On July 25, Cole Hamels pitched a no-hitter against the Chicago Cubs in a game that would turn out to be his last as a Phillie, as he was dealt to the Texas Rangers six days later. The following month saw Chase Utley being traded to the Dodgers, and in September, general manager Rubén Amaro Jr. was fired and replaced by Andy MacPhail as interim general manager. The team once again finished last in the NL East with a record of 63–99. In the offseason, MacPhail was officially named the organization's president of baseball operations, and the team hired Matt Klentak as the new general manager.

In 2016, the team finished fourth in the NL East, only winning eight more games than they had the previous year, with a 71–91 record. The 2016 season was the last for both Ryan Howard and catcher Carlos Ruiz in a Phillies' uniform, as Ruiz was traded to the Dodgers in late August, and the team opted not exercise their club option on Howard in the offseason, thus making him a free agent.

In 2017, the Phillies returned to the bottom of the NL East, finishing with a record of 66–96. After the season, Gabe Kapler replaced Pete Mackanin as manager. Kapler led the Phillies to a successful first half of the 2018 season, and the team found themselves in first place in early August with a 64–49 record. However, they suffered a late-season collapse where they finished the season with a 16–33 record and dropped to third in the division. During the season, starting pitcher Aaron Nola amassed a record of 17–6 with a 2.37 earned run average and would finish third in NL Cy Young Award voting.

=== Return to success (2019–present) ===
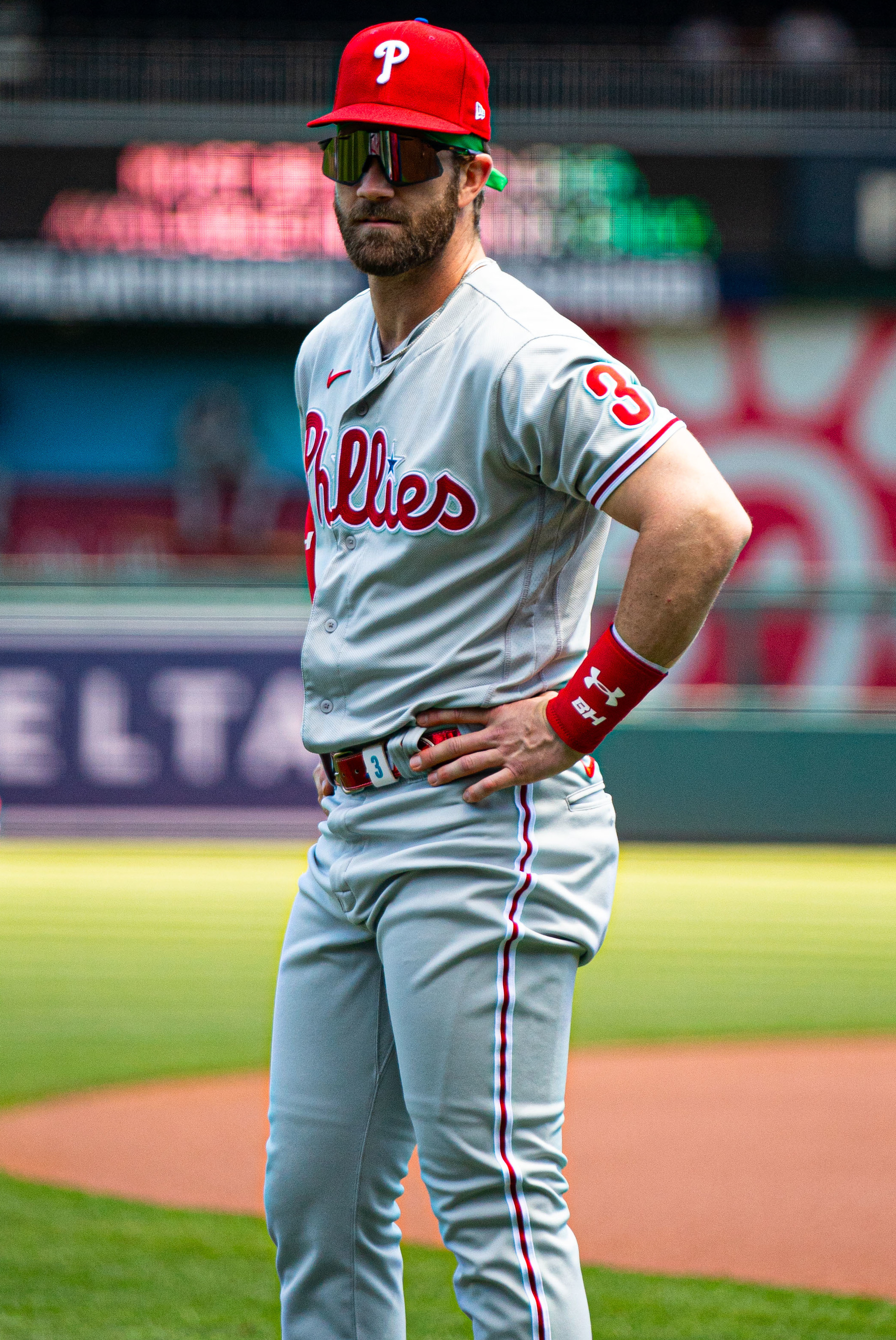
In 2019, the Phillies signed right fielder and designated hitter Bryce Harper to a 13-year, $330 million contract.

The Phillies intended to start targeting valuable free agents as soon as the 2018 season was over. Owner John Middleton publicly stated the team was willing to "spend stupid money". During the offseason, the Phillies signed outfielder Andrew McCutchen and reliver David Robertson, but their most significant move was signing star outfielder Bryce Harper to a 13-year, $330 million deal, an MLB record at the time. The team also made several trades, including trading for shortstop Jean Segura and the catcher J.T. Realmuto. The Phillies got off to a hot start the first two months with a record of 33–22, but regressed from there, finishing with a record of 81–81. After the season, manager Gabe Kapler was fired and replaced by Joe Girardi.

The Phillies entered the 2020 season with the additions of pitcher Zack Wheeler and shortstop Didi Gregorius from free agency over the offseason. In the 60-game season that was shorted due to the COVID-19 pandemic, the Phillies held a record of 27–25 and, due to the expanded playoff format for that season, they only needed to win two of their final eight games to secure a spot. However, the team collapsed and finished 1–7 to end the season with a losing record of 28–32. After the season, Matt Klentak stepped down as general manager, and the Phillies hired Dave Dombrowski as the president of baseball operations.

The Phillies hovered around the .500 mark for much of the 2021 season, and ultimately failed to make the playoffs with an 82–80 record, though this would clinch their first winning season since 2011. Bryce Harper was named NL MVP on the heels of a strong second half, and Zack Wheeler also finished second in NL Cy Young Award voting.

Over the 2021–22 offseason, the team targeted high-profile free agents and improved their lineup by signing outfielders Kyle Schwarber and Nick Castellanos. However, the Phillies got off to a sluggish start to the 2022 season. On June 3, with the team sitting at 22–29, Joe Girardi was fired and replaced by bench coach Rob Thomson, who was named the team's interim manager. Under Thomson, the Phillies' season immediately turned around, and they would go 65–46 (.586) in the remainder of their games on the season. The Phillies finished 87–75 and secured the final NL wild card spot to end their 11-year postseason drought.

In the best-of-three NL Wild Card Series, the Phillies traveled to St. Louis to play the NL Central champion Cardinals. The Phillies upset the Cardinals in two games and advanced to the NLDS, where they would play the defending World Series champion Atlanta Braves. The Phillies had finished 14 game back from the Braves in the regular season, but pulled off another upset by defeating them in four games. In the NLCS, the Phillies defeated the San Diego Padres in five games to clinch their first National League pennant since 2009. The series victory was capped off by a go-ahead home run late in Game 5 by eventual NLCS MVP Bryce Harper, a moment that has since been popularly referred to as "Bedlam at the Bank".

In the World Series, the Phillies met the Houston Astros, who had moved to the American League in 2013. Despite being heavy underdogs, the Phillies took Game 1 by erasing a five-run deficit, then Game 3 where they tied the MLB record for most home runs in a World Series game with five. However, in Game 4, the Phillies were no-hit by the Astros in the first combined no-hitter in MLB postseason history (and the second no-hitter in World Series history), and Houston would win the next two games and the series. The Phillies' Game 6 loss, coming hours after the Philadelphia Union fell in the MLS Cup, made Philadelphia the first American city to lose two major professional sports championship title games in the same day. Months later, the Philadelphia Eagles would also lose Super Bowl LVII, thus marking the first time three teams in the same city lost three consecutive major sports championships in history.

After their victory in the Wild Card Series, the Phillies had announced that Rob Thomson's interim tag would be removed and he would be retained as the full-time manager. In the offseason, the team made a major free agency move by signing shortstop Trea Turner to an 11-year, $300 million contract. The 2023 season saw another slow start to the season, with the team sitting at 25–32 by June 2. However, the team once again finished the season strong by going 65–40. New acquisition Trea Turner had struggled throughout the season, but had a notable turnaround when, in the beginning of August, fans began giving Turner a standing ovation each time he came up to bat. Almost immediately after ovations began, Turner's offensive production went up sharply and stayed high for the rest of the regular season. Another highlight of the season was a no-hitter pitched by newly-acquired pitcher Michael Lorenzen on August 9. The Phillies finished second in the NL East with a record of 90–72, but clinched the top wild card spot to return to the postseason.

In the Wild Card Series, the Phillies defeated the Miami Marlins in two games and advanced to the NLDS, where they would meet the Atlanta Braves for the second consecutive year. The Phillies had once again finished 14 games behind the Braves, but upset them for the second straight year in four games to advance to the NLCS. Facing the Arizona Diamondbacks, the Phillies quickly took a 2–0 series lead and held a 3–2 lead with the series returning to Philadelphia, but Arizona upset the Phillies in Games 6 and 7 (the first game seven in Phillies' franchise history) to end their season.

Seeking to rebound from their NLCS upset loss, the 2024 Phillies got off to one of the best starts in franchise history, holding a National League–best 45–20 record through the first 65 games. In June of that season, the Phillies participated in the MLB London Series, where they played the rival New York Mets in the team's first regular season games played outside of the United States or Canada. After the London Series, the Phillies declined and went 50–47 to finish the regular season, though this would be good enough to clinch their first NL East title since 2011. With a 95–67 record, the Phillies would hold the #2 seed in the National League for the postseason, and would play the wild-card Mets in the NLDS, where they were upset in four games.

In 2025, the Phillies bolstered their pitching by trading for starter Jesús Luzardo over the offseason and acquiring closer Jhoan Durán at the trade deadline. The team finished 96–66 and repeated as NL East champions, but were eliminated in the NLDS for the second straight season after losing to the Los Angeles Dodgers in four games.

The Phillies began the 2026 season with a disastrous 9–19 start, and on April 28, manager Rob Thomson was fired after five seasons with the team. Bench coach Don Mattingly was named interim manager, and, similar to when Thomson took on the interim role in 2022, Mattingly turned the Phillies' season around as the team finished the regular season 79–55 (.590) for a record of 88–74. The Phillies failed to win a third-consecutive NL East title, but clinched a wild-card berth on the final day of the regular season to earn their fifth-consecutive postseason appearance. In the NL Wild Card Series, the Phillies faced the NL East-champion Atlanta Braves, but lost in three games. Following the season, Don Mattingly was retained as the full-time manager.

== Team uniforms ==
=== Current uniforms ===
The current team colors, uniform, and logo date back to 1992. The main team colors are red and white, with blue serving as a prominent accent. The team name is written in red with a blue star serving as the dot over the "i"s, and blue piping is often found in Phillies' branded apparel and materials. The team's home uniform is white with red pinstripes, lettering and numbering. The road uniform is traditional grey with red lettering/numbering. Both bear a script-lettered "Phillies" logo, with the aforementioned star dotting the "i"s across the chest, and the player name and number on the back. The uniform's front script has undergone minor changes over the years. Hats are red with a single stylized "P". The uniforms and logo are very similar to those used during the "Whiz Kids" era from 1950 to 1969.

Prior to 2024, the Phillies were the one of two MLB teams to use chain stitching in their chest emblems, along with the St. Louis Cardinals. However, when Nike controversially changed the league's uniforms to the Vapor Premier uniform, the Phillies' wordmark crest was changed to a tackle twill patch style. In 2026, the Phillies brought back the chain-stitched look to their uniforms after MLB reverted to a pre-2024 template on all uniforms.

In 2008, the Phillies introduced an alternate, cream-colored uniform during home day games—a tribute to their 125th anniversary. The uniforms are similar to those worn from 1946 through 1949, featuring red lettering bordered with blue piping and lacking pinstripes. The accompanying cap is blue with a red bill and a red stylized "P". The uniforms were announced on November 29, 2007, when shortstop Jimmy Rollins, pitcher Cole Hamels, and Hall of Fame pitcher Robin Roberts modeled the new uniforms.

In 2016, the Phillies added a red alternate uniform, similar to their spring training uniforms, to be used for mid-week afternoon games. It was unofficially retired following the 2017 season, after which the Phillies revived their powder blue throwbacks as an alternate uniform to be used on select Thursday home games. The red alternates were brought back for select road games in 2021, and became the team's preferred uniform during "getaway day" road games. After the 2023 season, the Phillies retired the red alternates in anticipation of a new City Connect uniform, unveiled in 2024. The primarily light blue/midnight blue gradient uniform with yellow trim was heavily inspired by the flag of Philadelphia's colors of light blue and yellow, with "Philly" emblazoned on the chest. The cap has Liberty Bell silhouette with a light blue sky and midnight blue skyline, centered alongside two yellow stars. For the 2024 season, the Phillies wore their City Connect uniforms for 12 Friday night home games.

The Phillies are one of three teams in Major League Baseball that do not display the name of their city, state, or region on their road jerseys, along with the Los Angeles Angels and St. Louis Cardinals. as Until 2022, the Phillies were the only team that also displayed the player's number on one sleeve, except on the alternate jersey, in addition to the usual placement on the back of the jersey. Since 2023, the sleeves on the Phillies' primary uniforms were left blank in anticipation of a future uniform advertisement. In 2024, the Phillies unveiled Independence Blue Cross (IBX) as the team's first uniform advertiser.

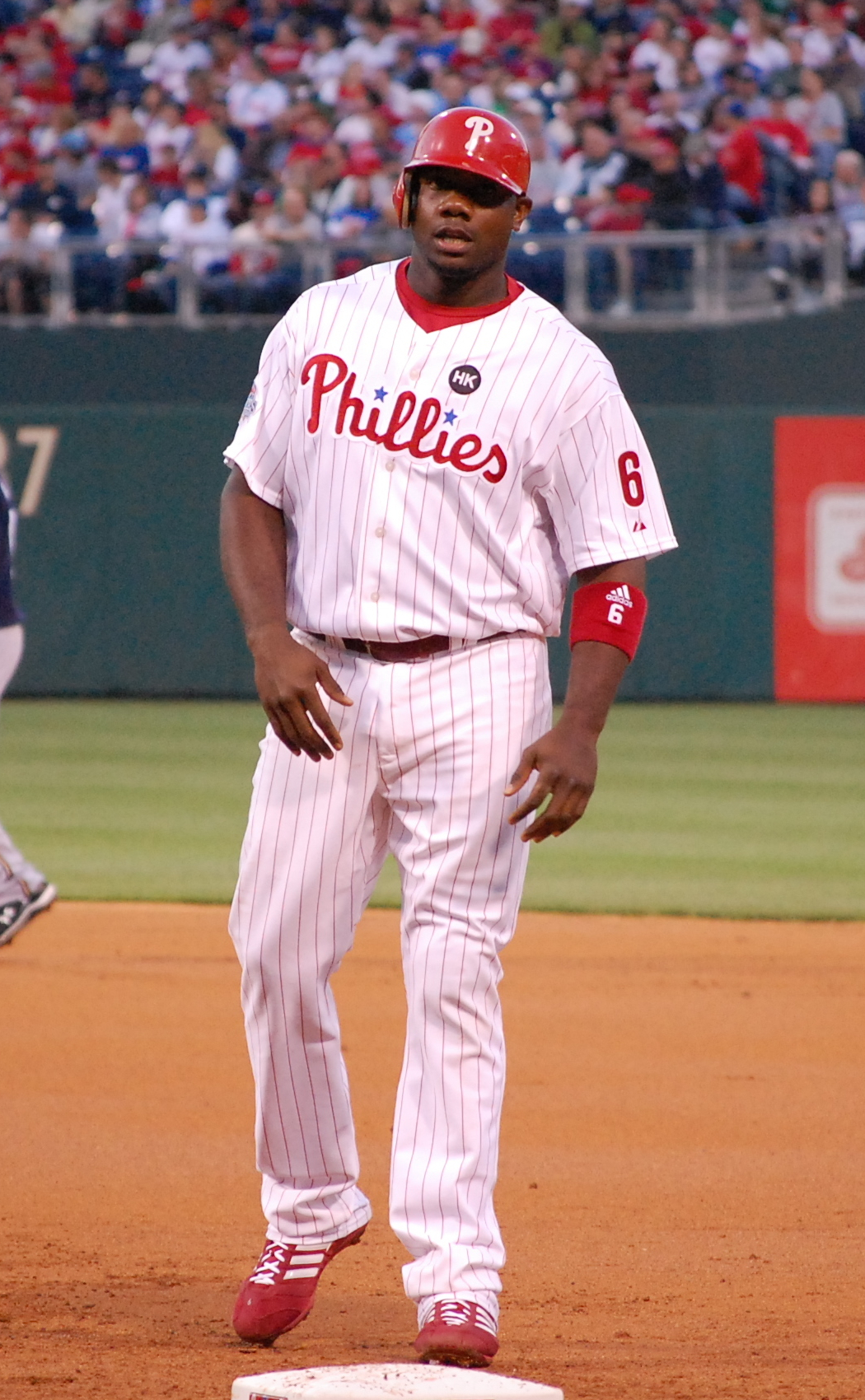
Ryan Howard wearing the current Phillies' home uniform (with Harry Kalas patch in 2009)

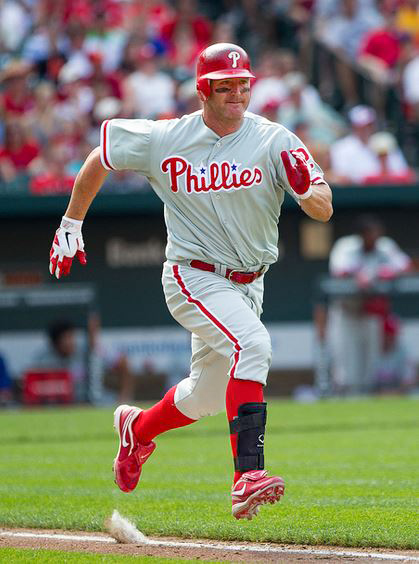
Jim Thome wearing the Phillies' grey road uniform

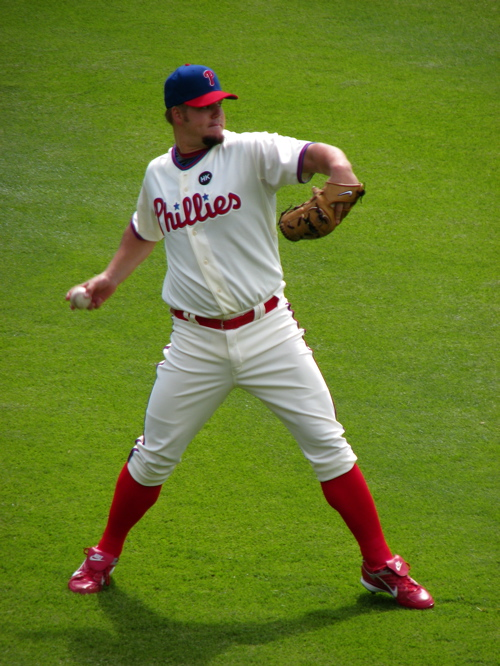
Joe Blanton wearing the alternate Phillies' home uniform (with Kalas patch in 2009)

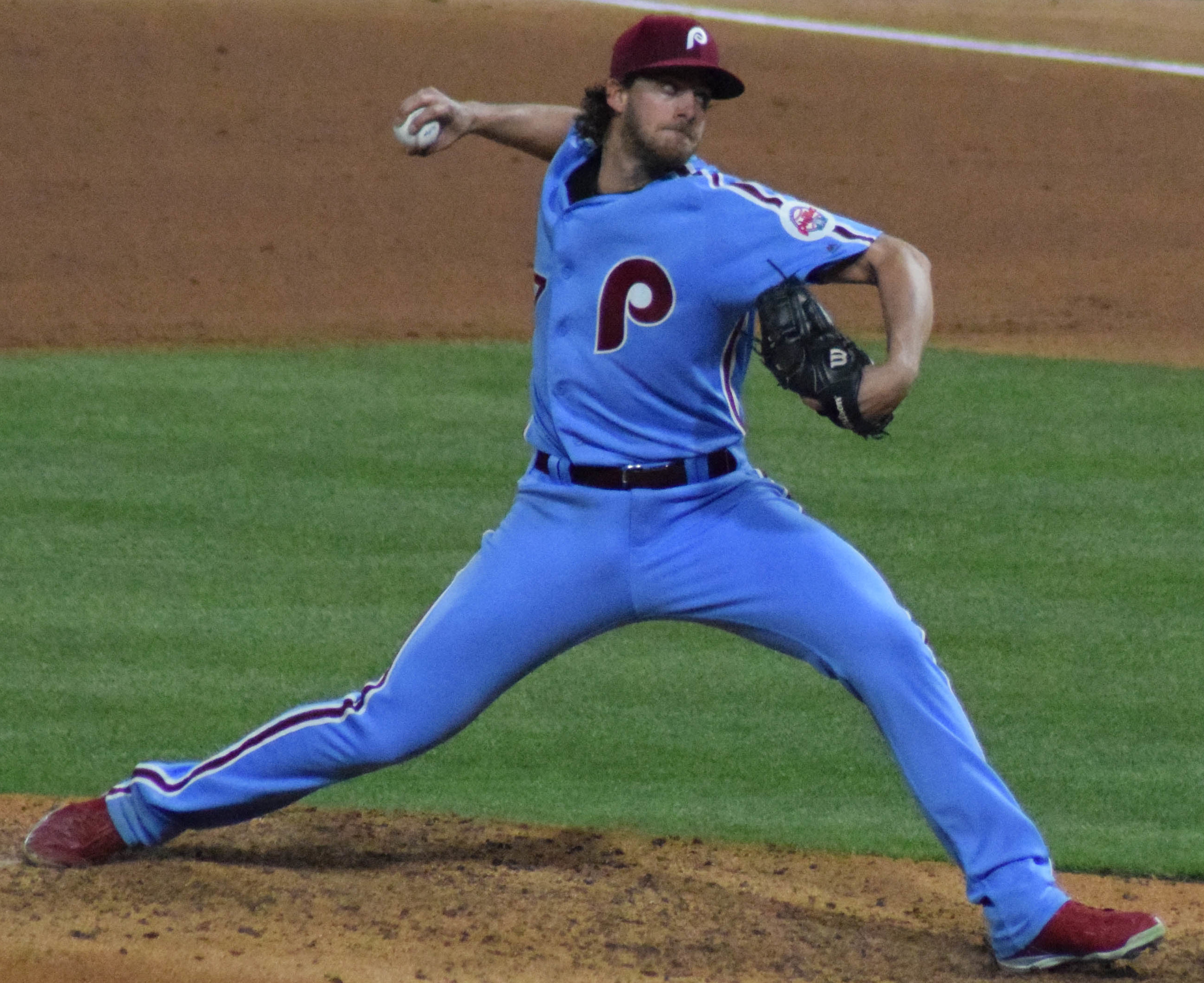
Aaron Nola wearing the Phillies' alternate throwback uniform

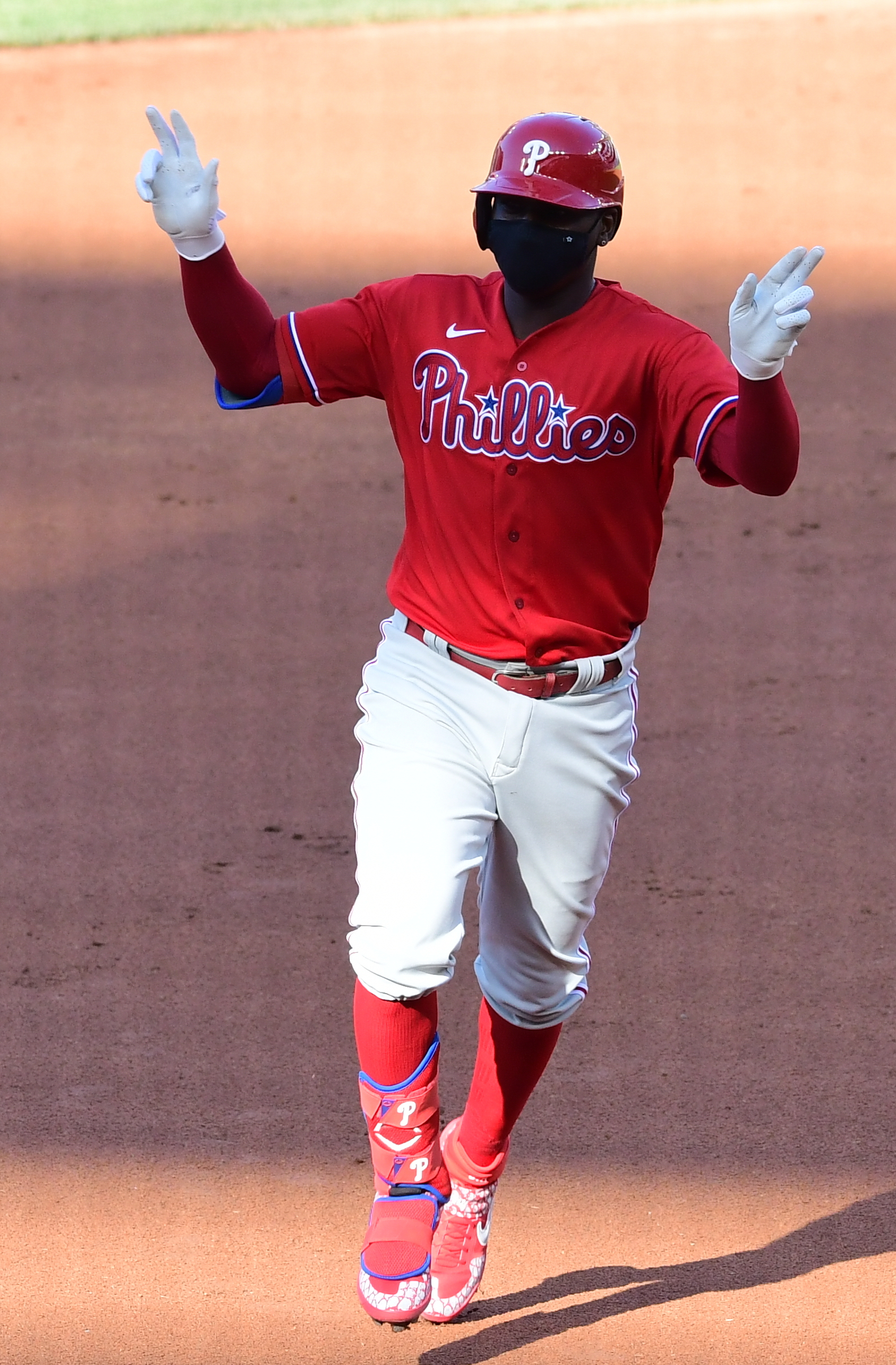
Didi Gregorius wearing the Phillies' alternate red uniform

=== Patches ===
From Opening Day through July 26, 2009, the Phillies wore 2008 World Champions patches on the right sleeve of their home uniforms to celebrate their World Series victory the season prior.

The Phillies have worn the following memorial patches:

- For the 2009 season the Phillies wore black, circular "HK" patches over their hearts in memory of broadcaster Harry Kalas, who died April 13, 2009, just before he was to broadcast a Phillies game in Washington, D.C.
- After the death of Hall of Fame pitcher Robin Roberts on May 6, 2010, the Phillies wore a black patch with a white "36" on the sleeves of their jerseys in memory of Roberts for the remainder of the 2010 season. Number 36 had been retired previously by the team in 1962 to honor Roberts.
- For the 2011 season, the Phillies wore a black circular patch with a "B" in honor of minority owners Alexander and John Buck, who died in late 2010.
- For the 2014 season, the Phillies wore a black circular patch with initials "CB" in honor of former owner Claire Betz, who died during the offseason.
- For the 2015 season, the Phillies wore a black circular patch with a white "SLB" in memory of minority owner Sara L. Buck, who died on August 23, 2014.
- For the 2017 season, the Phillies wore a black circular patch on their sleeves featuring the "baseball stitched" center swirl "P" used from 1970 to 1991 inside the white silhouette of a capital "D" in memory of former manager Dallas Green, who led the franchise to its first World Series championship and died on March 22, 2017.
- Following the death of former chairman, minority-owner, and president David Montgomery on May 8, 2019, the Phillies added a black circular patch with white "DPM" letters in memory of Montgomery for the remainder of the 2019 season.
- For the 2021 season, the Phillies wore a patch with the number "15" on it in honor of former player Dick Allen, who died the previous year.

=== Batting practice ===
The Phillies were an early adopter of the batting practice jersey in 1977, wearing a maroon v-necked top with the "Phillies" script name across the chest, as well as the player name and number on the back and a player number on the left sleeve, all in white. Pete Rose wore this maroon batting jersey in place of the road jersey during the 1979 All-Star Game. Currently, during spring training, the Phillies wear solid red practice jerseys with pinstriped pants for Grapefruit League home games. The red jerseys are worn with grey pants on the road.

=== Former uniforms ===
From 1970 to 1991, the Phillies sported colors, uniforms, and a logo that were noticeably different from what had come before, or since, but that were widely embraced by even traditionally minded fans. A dark burgundy was adopted as the main team color, with a classic pinstripe style for home uniforms. Blue was almost entirely dropped as part of the team's official color scheme, except in one area; a pale blue (as opposed to traditional grey) was used as the base-color for away game uniforms from 1972 to 1988. Yet the most important aspect of the 1970 uniform change was the adoption of one of the more distinctive logos in sports; a Phillies "P" that, thanks to its unique shape and "baseball stitched" center swirl, remained instantly recognizable and admired, long after its regular use had ended. It was while wearing this uniform style and color motif that the club achieved its most enduring success, including a World Series title in 1980 and another World Series appearance in 1983. Its continued popularity with fans is still evident. Even today, Phillies' home games can contain many fans sporting caps, shirts or jackets emblazoned with the iconic "P" and burgundy color scheme. The current team has worn the burgundy and powder blue throwbacks whenever their opponents are wearing throwback uniforms from that era. Additionally, this uniform also marked the first appearance of "racing stripes" on a baseball uniform (striping going down the jersey shoulders, the side of the pants and up to the sides of the jersey up to the armpit), which would be seen on several other MLB teams for the next quarter-century.

=== Controversial uniform changes ===
In 1979, the Phillies' front office modified the uniform into an all-burgundy version with white trimmings, to be worn for Saturday games. They were called "Saturday Night Specials" and were worn for the first and last time on May 19, 1979, a 10–5 loss to the Montreal Expos. The immediate reaction of the media, fans, and players alike was negative, with many describing the despised uniforms as pajama-like. As such, the idea was hastily abandoned. Mike Schmidt did wear the uniform during the MLB All-Star Tour of Japan following the 1979 season. During the closing ceremonies at Veterans Stadium on September 28, 2003, there was a procession of former players during the post-game ceremony, most in uniform. Larry Christenson, the starting pitcher in the original game, came out wearing this old burgundy uniform and was the only one to do so. The Phillies wore this jersey again for the 40th anniversary of the original game on July 27, 2019. Christenson threw out the ceremonial first pitch. They lost to the Atlanta Braves 15–7.

Another uniform controversy arose in 1994, when the Phillies introduced all-blue caps on Opening Day that were to be worn for home day games only. The caps were unpopular with the players, who considered them bad luck after two losses and wanted them discontinued. Management wanted to keep using the caps as planned, as they sold well to fans. A compromise was reached: the players agreed to wear them for weekday games while returning to the customary red caps for Sunday afternoon games. In all, the Phillies wore the "unlucky" blue caps for seven games in 1994, losing six (the lone victory a 5–2 triumph over the Florida Marlins on June 29). A slightly different blue cap (with a red bill) was introduced in 2008 as part of the alternate home uniform for day games, a throwback to the late 1940s.

== Rivalries ==
The Phillies had several notable rivalries through history as they often clashed frequently against the Atlanta Braves, Los Angeles Dodgers, and the New York Mets during the 1970s, 1980s, 1990s, and the 2000s. The Phillies often faced heated matchups against all three teams. Against the Dodgers and the Braves, those matchups have happened in the postseason, the Dodgers five times in the NLCS, the Braves twice in the NLDS and once in the NLCS. The fierceness of their matchups against the Mets are due to the geographic New York-Philadelphia rivalry, which is also seen in other sports.

=== Atlanta Braves ===
The Phillies rivalry with the Atlanta Braves started prior to the teams becoming division mates, as the Phillies upset the Braves in the 1993 NL Championship Series, a year before the Braves moved to the NL East. While the Braves have often gotten the best of the Phillies in the regular season, the Phillies have flipped the script in the postseason, going 3–1 against the Braves (1993, 2022, 2023, and 2026), creating a rivalry where both fanbases own bragging rights.

Throughout their rivalry since 1994, both franchises have dominated the National League East standings. The Braves won the division from 1995–2005, the Phillies won five straight from 2007–2011, and the Braves would then win six straight from 2018–2023. Most recently, the Phillies won consecutive NL East titles in 2024 and 2025, and the Braves won the division in 2026.

=== New York Mets ===
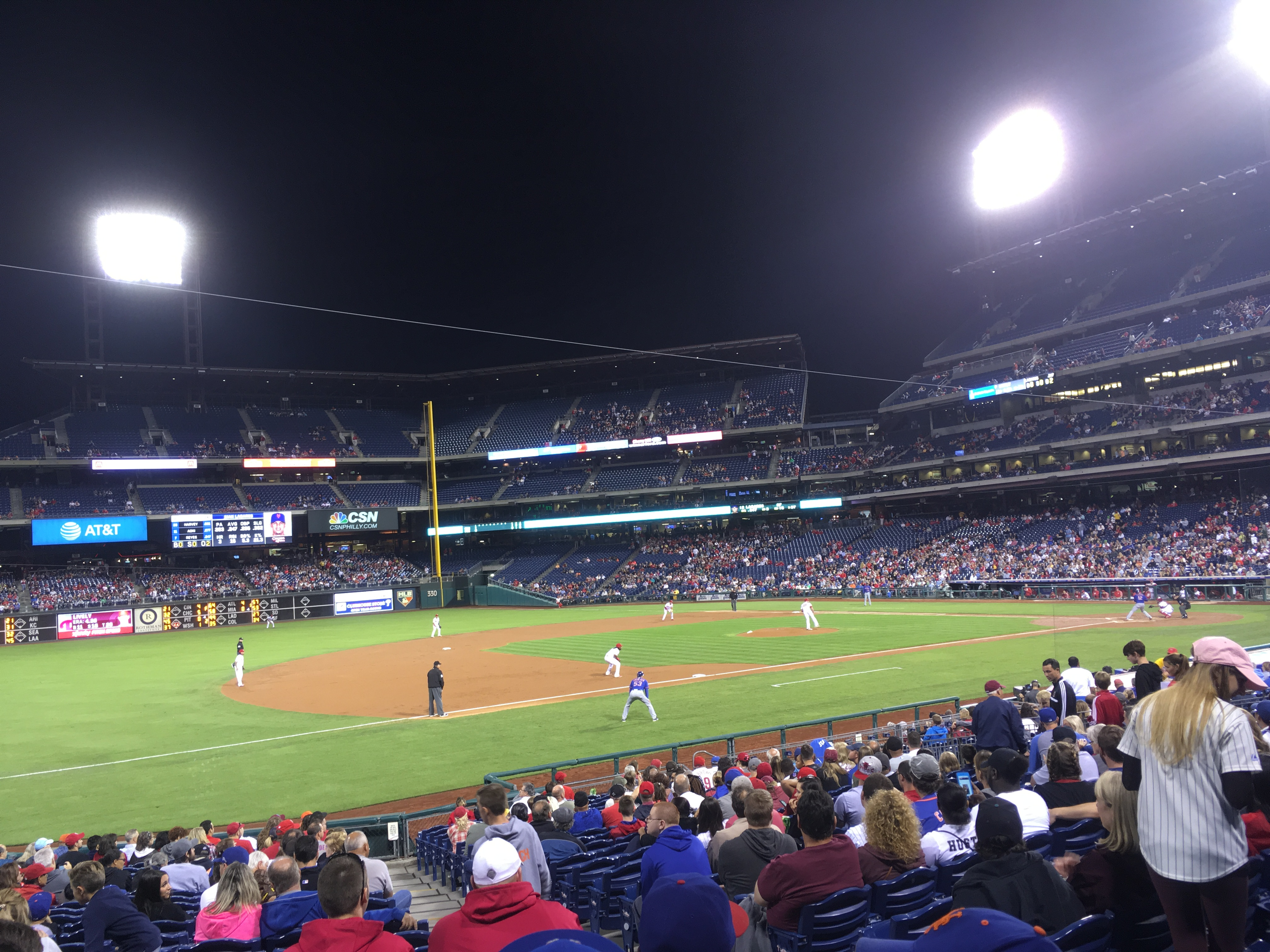
The Phillies play division rival New York Mets at Citizens Bank Park on September 29, 2017

The rivalry between the New York Mets and the Phillies has been said to be among the "hottest" rivalries in the National League. The two National League East divisional rivals have met each other recently in playoff, division, and wild card races.

Aside from several brawls in the 1980s, the rivalry remained low-key before the 2006 season, as the teams had seldom been equally good at the same time. Since 2006, the teams have battled for playoff position. The Mets won the division in 2006 and contended in 2007 and 2008, while the Phillies won five consecutive division titles from 2007 to 2011. The Phillies' 2007 Eastern Division Title was won on the last day of the season as the Mets lost a seven-game lead with 17 games remaining. The two teams had their first playoff meeting in the 2024 National League Division Series, where the Mets won the series 3-1, while Nick Castellanos had a walk off base hit to win game two for the Phillies at home.

There is a long-standing rivalry between the sports fans from New York City and Philadelphia, which are approximately two hours apart by car, and is also reflected in matchups such as the New York Giants and the Philadelphia Eagles in the National Football League, and the New York Rangers and the Philadelphia Flyers in National Hockey League. Games between the two teams at Citi Field and Citizens Bank Park are often very intense, as each home crowd seeks to create a challenging atmosphere for visiting-team fans.

=== Pittsburgh Pirates ===
The rivalry between the Phillies and the Pittsburgh Pirates was considered by some to be one of the best rivalries in the National League. The rivalry started when the Pittsburgh Pirates entered National League play in their fifth season of 1887, four years after the Phillies.

The Phillies and the Pirates had remained together after the National League split into two divisions in 1969. During the period of two-division play (1969–1993), the two National League East division rivals won the two highest numbers of division championships, reigning exclusively as NL East champions in the 1970s and again in the early 1990s, the Pirates nine, the Phillies six; together, the teams' 15 championships accounted for more than half of the 25 NL East championships during that span.

After the Pirates moved to the National League Central in 1994, the teams face each other in only two series each year and the rivalry has diminished. However, many fans, especially older ones, retain their dislike for the other team and regional differences between Eastern and Western Pennsylvania still fuel the rivalry. The rivalry between the Philadelphia Flyers and the Pittsburgh Penguins in the National Hockey League is also fiercely contested.

=== Washington Nationals/Montreal Expos ===
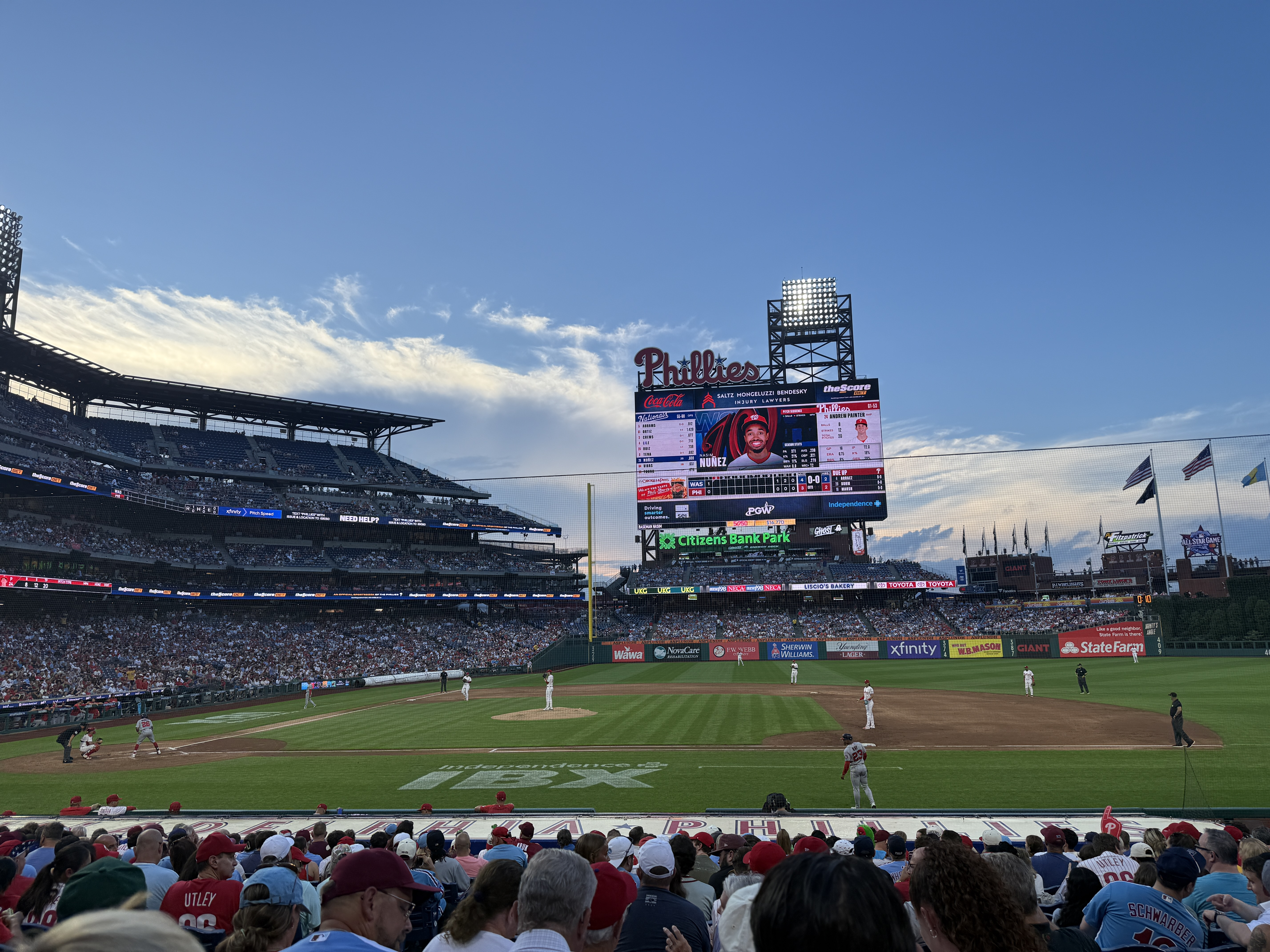
The Phillies taking on the Washington Nationals at Citizens Bank Park in August 2026

The Phillies' rivalry with the Washington Nationals extends back during their original tenure as the Montreal Expos. The two teams repeatedly battled for control of the division in the early 1980s and mid 1990s. Following the franchise's relocation to Washington DC in 2005; the rivalry increased in geographic tension due to Washington's proximity to Philadelphia. The rivalry quickly spiked in intensity during the 2010s after Nationals team management introduced a campaign to block Phillies fans from overtaking home games. In 2019; star-outfielder Bryce Harper further fueled tensions after signing a 13-year $330 million contract with the Phillies as a free agent. The Nationals later managed to win the 2019 World Series during the first year of Harper's absence. The Phillies currently lead the series 482–445, but the Nationals lead the postseason series; when the Expos managed a 3–2 victory over the Phillies during the 1981 NLDS.

The rivalry is also mirrored in the Philadelphia-Washington rivalry, which is also seen in other sports, like between the Philadelphia Eagles and the Washington Commanders and the Philadelphia Flyers and the Washington Capitals. The two cities are approximately two and a half hours apart by car.

=== Historical rivalries ===
==== City Series: Philadelphia Athletics ====
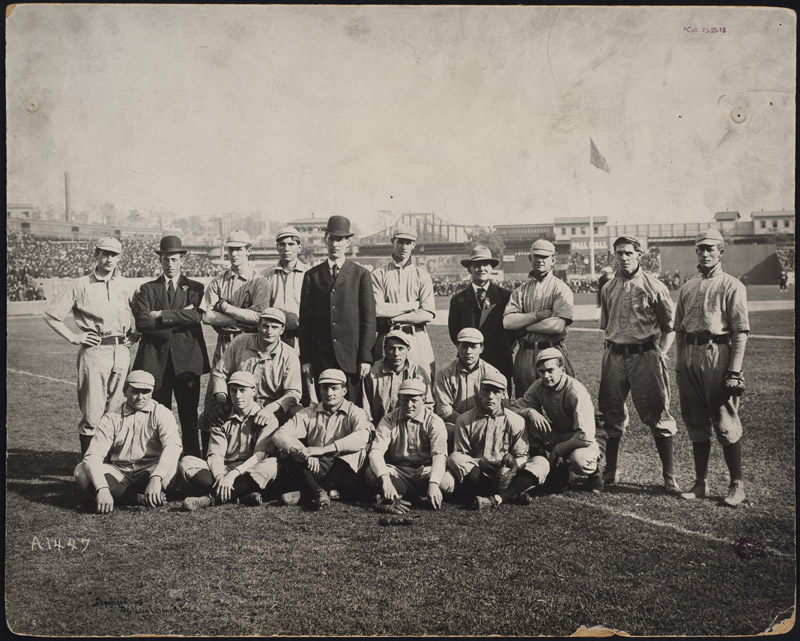
Connie Mack and the Philadelphia Athletics, 1905 World Series

The City Series was the name of a series of baseball games played between the Philadelphia Athletics of the American League and the Phillies that ran from 1903 through 1955. After the A's move to Kansas City, Missouri in 1955, the City Series rivalry came to an end. The teams have since faced each other in Interleague play (since its introduction in 1997) but the rivalry has effectively died in the intervening years since the A's left Philadelphia. In 2014, when the A's faced the Phillies in inter-league play at Oakland Coliseum, the Athletics did not bother to mark the historical connection, going so far as to have a Connie Mack promotion the day before the series while the Texas Rangers were in Oakland.

The first City Series was held in 1883 between the Phillies and the American Association's Athletics. When the Athletics first joined the American League, the two teams played each other in a spring and fall series. No City Series was held in 1901 and 1902 due to legal warring between the National and American Leagues.

== Roster ==
Philadelphia Phillies 2027 spring training roster
40-man roster		Non-roster invitees	Coaches / other
Pitchers: 19 Kyle Backhus; 58 Tanner Banks; 52 Jonathan Bowlan; 59 Jhoan Durán; 51 Grant Holman; 40 Brad Keller; 50 Orion Kerkering; 56 Caleb Kilian; 60 Max Lazar; -- Jordan Leasure; 44 Jesús Luzardo; 37 Tim Mayza; 71 Alex McFarlane; 27 Aaron Nola; 24 Andrew Painter; 57 Alan Rangel; 61 Cristopher Sánchez; 55 Chase Shugart; 45 Zack Wheeler	Catchers: 13 Rafael Marchán; 10 J. T. Realmuto; Infielders: 3 Bryce Harper; -- Bryan Rincon; 5 Bryson Stott; 7 Trea Turner; -- Shay Whitcomb; Outfielders: 2 Justin Crawford; 49 Derek Hill; 31 Otto Kemp; 16 Brandon Marsh; 18 Kameron Misner; 29 Félix Reyes; 17 Gabriel Rincones Jr.; 23 Johan Rojas; -- Colby Thomas; Designated hitters: 12 Kyle Schwarber	Pitchers: -- Geoff Hartlieb; -- Max Kranick; Catchers: -- Brian Navarreto; Infielders: -- Bryan Ramos	Manager: 8 Don Mattingly; Coaches: 95 Mike Calitri (major league field coordinator); -- Carlos Mendoza (third base/infield); 65 Caleb Cotham (pitching); 38 Paco Figueroa (first base); 97 Brad Flanders (bullpen catcher); -- Peter Fatse (hitting); -- Joe Cronin (assistant hitting); 93 Mark Lowy (assistant pitching); 94 Rafael Pena (assistant hitting); 98 Hector Rabago (bullpen catcher); 91 Cesar Ramos (bullpen); 62 Dusty Wathan (bench); 36 active, 0 inactive, 4 non-roster invitees; 7-, 10-, or 15-day injured list; * Not on active roster; ^{†} Suspended list; Roster, coaches, and NRIs updated November 20, 2026; Transactions • Depth chart; → All MLB rosters

== Team managers ==
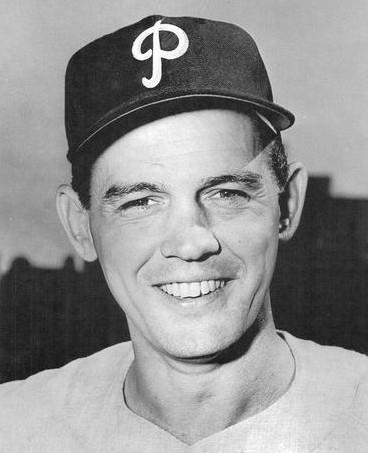
Gene Mauch, Phillies' manager from 1960 to 1968

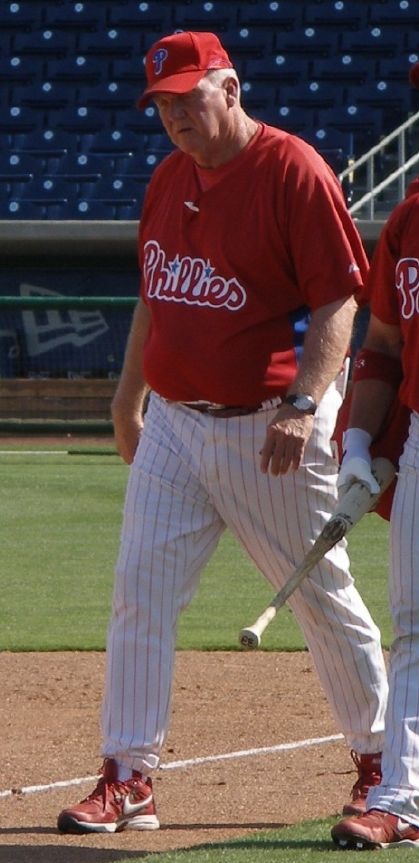
Charlie Manuel, Phillies' manager from 2005 to 2013 and the winningest Phillies' manager in franchise history

Over 126 seasons, the Phillies' franchise has employed 55 managers. The duties of the team manager include team strategy and leadership on and off the field. Seven managers have taken the Phillies to the postseason, with Danny Ozark, Charlie Manuel and Rob Thomson each leading the team to at least three playoff appearances. Manuel and Dallas Green are the only Phillies' managers to win a World Series: Green in 1980 against the Kansas City Royals; and Manuel in 2008 against the Tampa Bay Rays. Charlie Manuel is the longest-tenured manager in franchise history, with 1,416 games of service in parts of nine seasons (2005–2013).

== Achievements ==
=== Awards ===
Six Phillies have won Most Valuable Player Awards during their career with the team. Mike Schmidt leads with three wins, with back-to-back MVPs in 1980 and 1981, and in 1986 as well. Chuck Klein (1932), Jim Konstanty (1950), Ryan Howard (2006), Jimmy Rollins (2007), and Bryce Harper (2021) all have one. Pitcher Steve Carlton leads the team in Cy Young Award wins with four (1972, 1977, 1980, and 1982), while John Denny (1983), Steve Bedrosian (1987), and Roy Halladay (2010) each have one. Four Phillies have won Rookie of the Year honors as well. Jack Sanford won in 1957, Dick Allen in 1964. Third baseman Scott Rolen brought home the honors in 1997, while Howard was the most recent Phillies' winner in 2005. In doing so, Howard became only the second player in MLB history to win Rookie of the Year and Most Valuable Player in consecutive years, Cal Ripken Jr. of the Baltimore Orioles being the first.

Of the players who have hit four home runs in one game, four were Phillies at the time (more than any other team).Ed Delahanty was the first, hitting his four in Chicago's West Side Park on July 13, 1896. Chuck Klein repeated the feat nearly 40 years later to the day, on July 10, 1936, at Pittsburgh's Forbes Field. Forty years later, on April 17, 1976, Mike Schmidt became the third, with his four in Chicago's Wrigley Field, in a wild 18-16 game which saw a total of nine home runs and 43 hits, aided by a 20 miles per hour wind. On August 28, 2025, Kyle Schwarber become the fourth Phillie to record a four-home run game against the visiting Atlanta Braves at Citizens Bank Park.

=== Hall of Famers ===
See footnote

Philadelphia Phillies Hall of Famers
Affiliation according to the National Baseball Hall of Fame and Museum
Philadelphia Phillies

Grover Cleveland Alexander *
**Dick Allen** *
Sparky Anderson
**Richie Ashburn** *
Dave Bancroft *
Chief Bender
Dan Brouthers
**Jim Bunning**

**Steve Carlton** *
Roger Connor
Ed Delahanty *
Hugh Duffy
Johnny Evers
Elmer Flick
Jimmie Foxx
Pat Gillick
Roy Halladay

Billy Hamilton *
Bucky Harris
Ferguson Jenkins
Hughie Jennings
Jim Kaat
Tim Keefe
**Chuck Klein** *
Nap Lajoie

Pedro Martínez
Tommy McCarthy
Joe Morgan
Kid Nichols
Tony Pérez
Eppa Rixey
**Robin Roberts** *
Scott Rolen *
Ryne Sandberg

**Mike Schmidt** *
Casey Stengel
Jim Thome
Sam Thompson *
Billy Wagner
Lloyd Waner
Hack Wilson
Harry Wright *

- Players and managers listed in **bold** are depicted on their Hall of Fame plaques wearing a Phillies cap insignia.
- * Philadelphia Phillies listed as primary team according to the Hall of Fame

=== Ford C. Frick Award recipients ===
Philadelphia Phillies Ford C. Frick Award recipients
Affiliation according to the National Baseball Hall of Fame and Museum

Herb Carneal

Al Helfer

**Harry Kalas**

Tim McCarver

**By Saam**

- **Names in bold** received the award based primarily on their work as broadcasters for the Phillies.

=== Retired numbers and other honors ===
The Phillies have retired eight numbers, and honored five additional players with the letter "P" which stands for the team's name. Grover Cleveland Alexander, Ed Delahanty, Billy Hamilton, and Sam Thompson played with the team in the era before Major League Baseball used uniform numbers, and Chuck Klein wore a variety of numbers with the team during his career. Of the eight players with retired numbers, seven were retired for their play with the Phillies and one, 42, was universally retired by Major League Baseball when they honored the 50th anniversary of Jackie Robinson's breaking the color barrier.

Richie
Ashburn
CF, TV
Retired
1979
Jim
Bunning
RHP
Retired
2001
Dick
Allen
1B, 3B
Retired
2020
Mike
Schmidt
3B
Retired
1990
Steve
Carlton
LHP
Retired
1989
Roy
Halladay
RHP
Retired
2021
Robin
Roberts
RHP
Retired
1962
Jackie
Robinson
2B
Retired
by MLB 1997
Grover C.
Alexander
RHP
Honored
2001^{[a]}
Chuck
Klein
RF
Honored
2001^{[b]}
Ed
Delahanty
LF
Honored
2025
Billy
Hamilton
CF
Honored
2025
Sam
Thompson
RF
Honored
2025

=== Wall of Fame ===
The Wall of Fame was located in Ashburn Alley at Citizens Bank Park from the stadium's opening in 2004 to 2017. In 2018, the exhibit was moved to a new plaza between the left-field scoreboard and the left-field entrance of the stadium.

The Phillies Wall of Fame was started in 1978 as the Philadelphia Baseball Wall of Fame. Until 2004, the Phillies inducted one former Phillie and one former member of the Philadelphia Athletics per year. Since 2004, they have only inducted one Phillie annually (with the exception of 2022 and 2023, when they inducted two and three Phillies, respectively). Eligible players must be retired and must have played at least four years with the Phillies. The Phillies' inductees to the Wall of Fame are listed below:

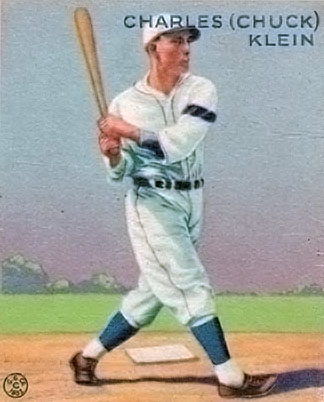
Chuck Klein, 1980 Wall of Fame inductee

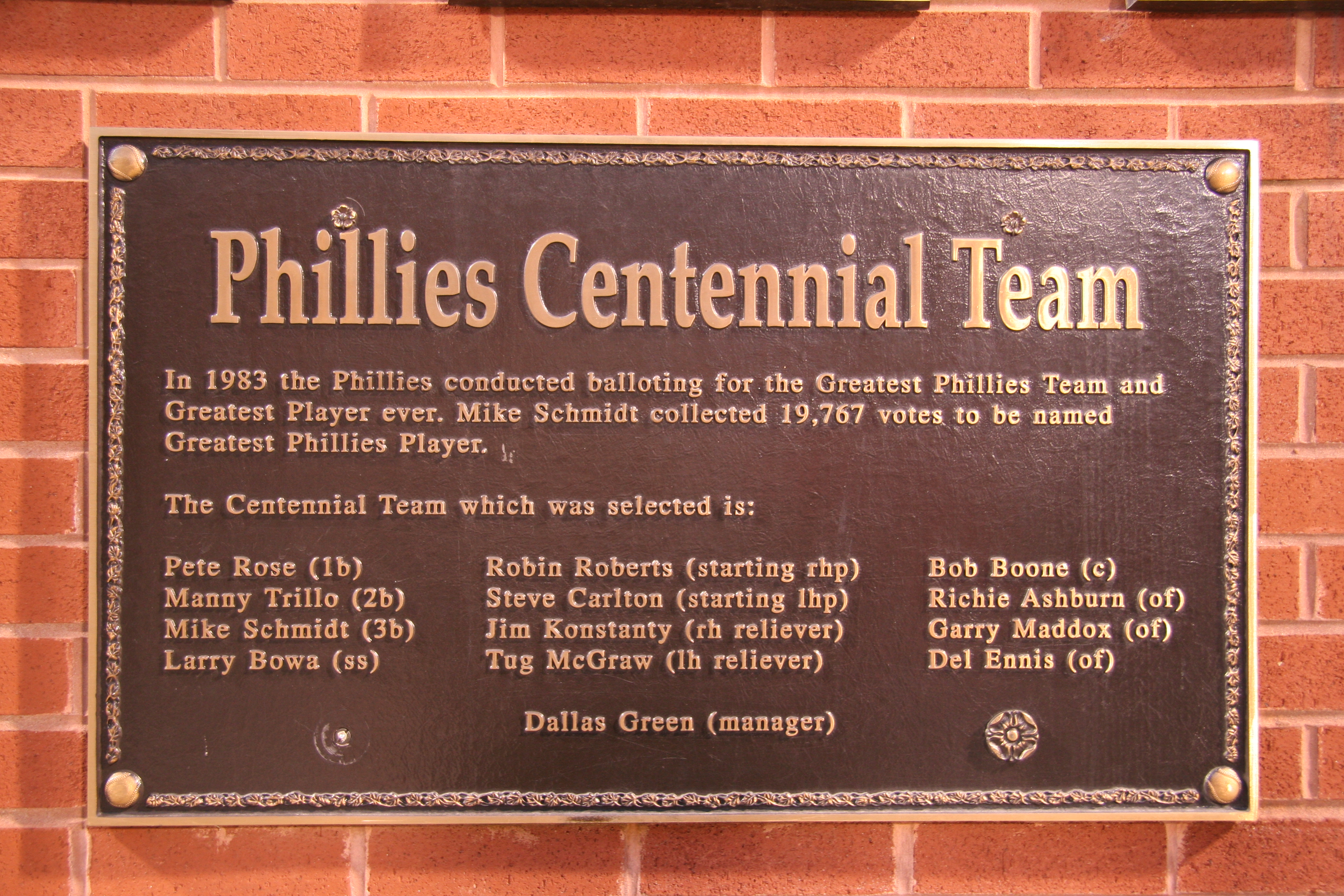
Phillies Centennial Team, 1983 Wall of Fame inductees

Mike Schmidt, 1990 Wall of Fame inductee

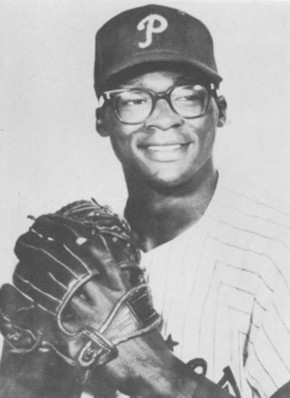
Dick Allen, 1993 Wall of Fame inductee

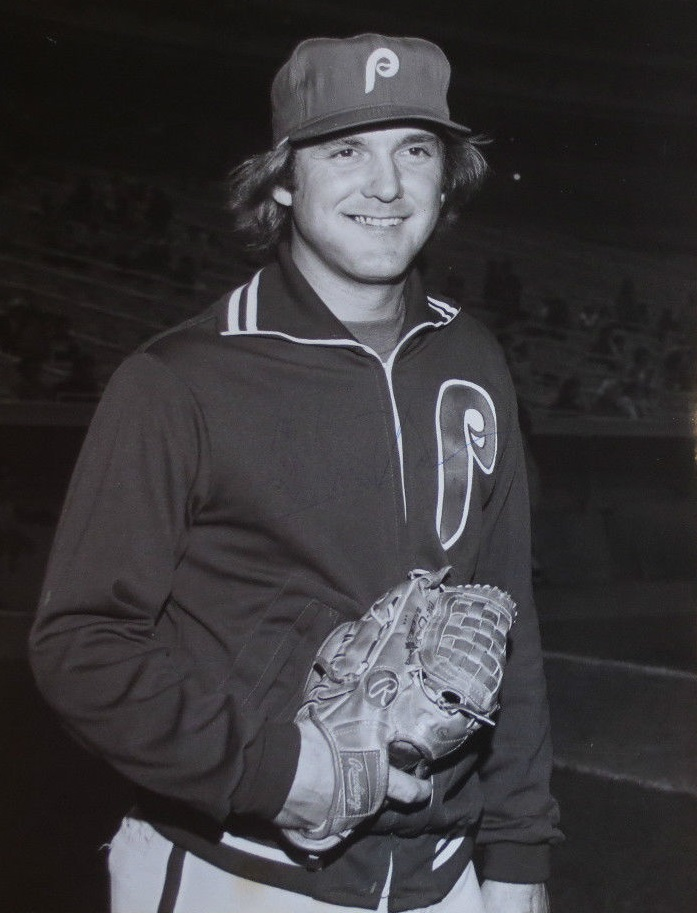
Tug McGraw, 1998 Wall of Fame inductee

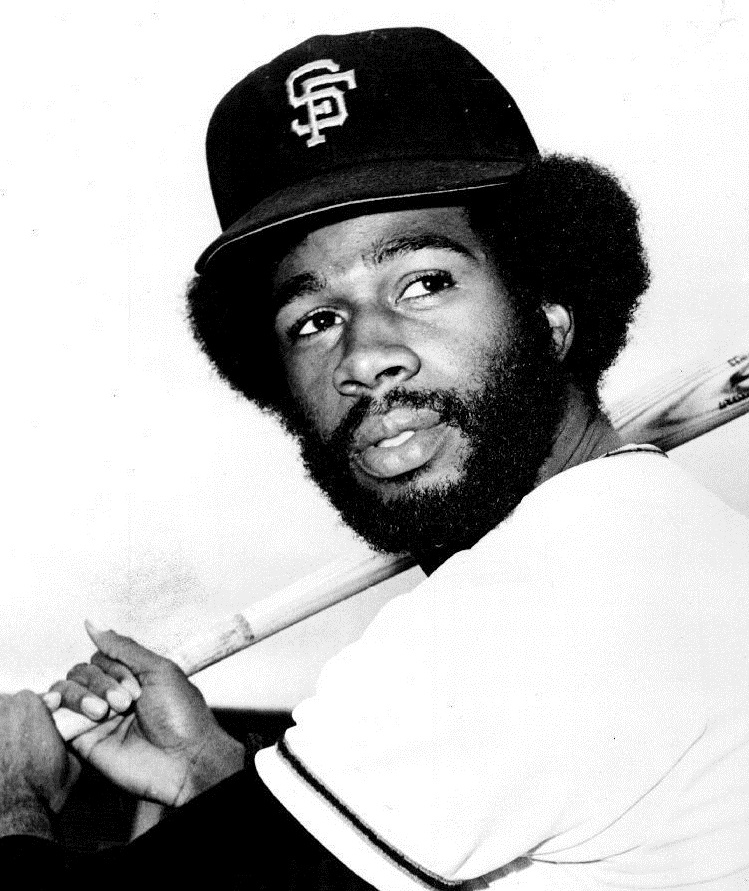
Garry Maddox, 2001 Wall of Fame inductee

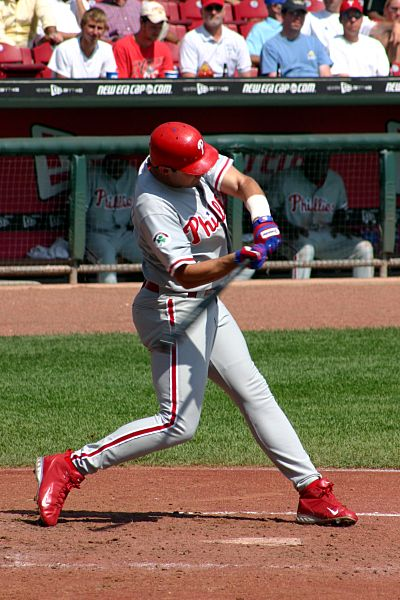
Pat Burrell, 2015 Wall of Fame inductee

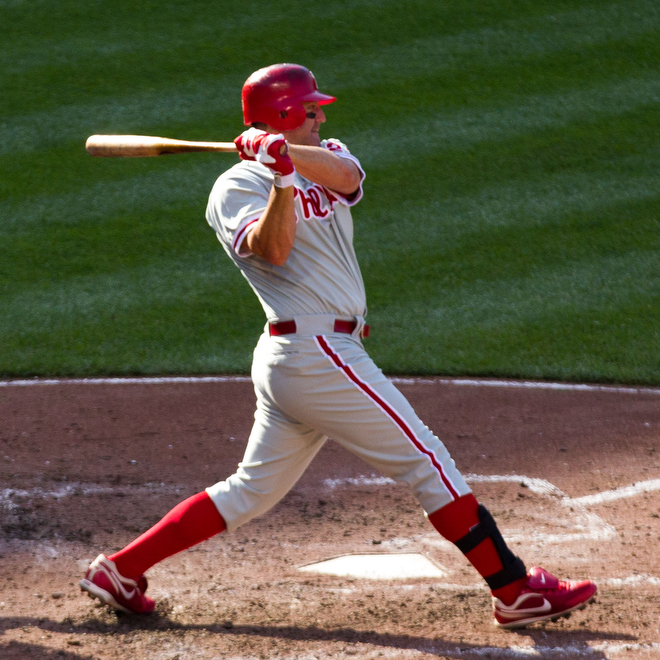
Jim Thome, 2016 Wall of Fame inductee

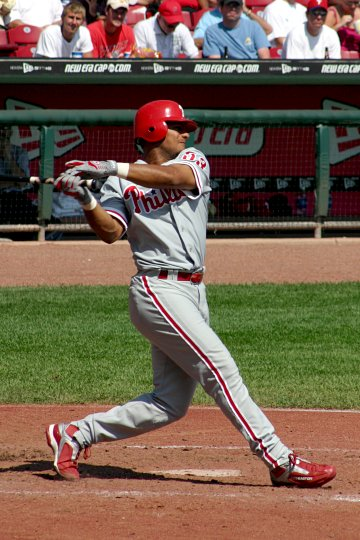
Bobby Abreu, 2019 Wall of Fame inductee

†	Member of the National Baseball Hall of Fame and Museum
	Recipient of the Hall of Fame's Ford C. Frick Award

Philadelphia Phillies Wall of Fame
Inducted	Player	Position	Years	Ref
1978	Robin Roberts^{†}^{[b]}	P	1948–1961	
1978	Richie Ashburn^{†}^{[b]}	OF; TV	1948–1959; 1963–1997	
1979	Chuck Klein^{†}^{[b]}	OF	1928–1933; 1936–1939; 1940–1944	
1980	Grover Cleveland Alexander^{†}^{[b]}	P	1911–1917; 1930	
1981	Del Ennis	OF	1946–1956	
1982	Jim Bunning^{†}^{[b]}	P	1964–1969; 1970–1971	
1984	Ed Delahanty^{†}	OF	1888–1889; 1891–1901	
1985	Cy Williams	OF	1918–1930	
1986	Granny Hamner	SS	1944–1959	
1987	Paul Owens	MGR; GM; EXEC	1972, 1983–1984; 1972–1983; 1984–2003	
1988	Steve Carlton^{†}^{[b]}	P	1972–1986	
1989	Mike Schmidt^{†}^{[b]}	3B	1972–1989	
1990	Larry Bowa	SS; MGR	1970–1981; 2001–2004	
1991	Chris Short	P	1959–1972	
1992	Curt Simmons	P	1947–1960	
1993	Dick Allen^{†}^{[b]}	1B/3B/OF	1963–1969; 1975–1976	
1994	Willie Jones	3B	1947–1959	
1995	Sam Thompson^{†}	OF	1889–1898	
1996	Johnny Callison	OF	1960–1969	
1997	Greg Luzinski	OF	1970–1980	
1998	Tug McGraw	P	1975–1984	
1999	Gavvy Cravath	OF; MGR	1912–1920; 1919–1920	
2000	Garry Maddox	OF	1975–1986	
2001	Tony Taylor	2B	1960–1971; 1974–1976	
2002	Sherry Magee	OF	1904–1914	
2003	Billy Hamilton^{†}	OF	1890–1895	
2005	Bob Boone	C	1972–1982	
2006	Dallas Green	P MGR	1960–1967; 1979–1981	
2007	John Vukovich	INF; CO; EXEC	1970–1971, 1976–1981; 1988–2004; 2004–2007	
2008	Juan Samuel	2B; CO	1983–1989; 2011–2017	
2009	Harry Kalas^{†}	TV	1971–2009	
2010	Darren Daulton	C	1983; 1985–1997	
2011	John Kruk	1B; TV	1989–1994; 2017–present	
2012	Mike Lieberthal	C	1994–2006	
2013	Curt Schilling	P	1992–2000	
2014	Charlie Manuel	MGR; CO	2005–2013; 2019	
2015	Pat Burrell	OF	2000–2008	
2016	Jim Thome^{†}	1B	2003–2005, 2012	
2017	No inductees (Note: On April 10, 2017, it was announced Pete Rose would be that year's inductee into the Wall of Fame (Rose is already a member of the 1983 Centennial Team, but was planned to be honored with his own individual plaque). However, on August 12, 2017, just ten days before the ceremony, the Phillies announced Rose would not be inducted amid recent statutory rape allegations. The Phillies would ultimately not induct a new member of the Wall of Fame for 2017, and instead honored past members.)			
2018	Pat Gillick^{†}	GM; EXEC	2005–2008; 2008–present	
2018	Roy Halladay^{†}^{[b]}	P	2010–2013	
2019	Bobby Abreu	OF	1998–2006	
2020	Manny Trillo	2B	1979–1982	
2022	Bake McBride	RF/CF	1977–1981	
2022	Ron Reed	P	1976–1983	
2023	Ruly Carpenter	EXEC	1963–1981	
2023	John Quinn	GM	1959–1972	
2023	Scott Rolen^{†}	3B	1996–2002	
2024	David Montgomery	EXEC	1971–2019	
2025	Jimmy Rollins	SS	2000–2014	
2025	Ed Wade	GM	1998–2005	
2026	Chase Utley	2B	2003–2015	

==== Centennial Team ====
In 1983, rather than inducting a player into the Wall of Fame, the Phillies selected their Centennial Team, commemorating the best players of the first 100 years in franchise history.

**List of players honored as Centennial Team members**
Player	Position
Richie Ashburn^{†}^{[b]}	CF
Bob Boone	C
Larry Bowa	SS
Steve Carlton^{†}^{[b]}	LHP
Garry Maddox	CF
Dallas Green	MGR
Jim Konstanty	RHP
Del Ennis	OF
Tug McGraw	LHP
Robin Roberts^{†}^{[b]}	RHP
Pete Rose	1B
Mike Schmidt^{†}^{[b]}	3B
Manny Trillo	2B

=== Philadelphia Sports Hall of Fame ===
Phillies in the Philadelphia Sports Hall of Fame
Name	Position	Tenure	Inducted
Richie Ashburn	CF; Broadcaster	1948–1959; 1963–1997	2004
Steve Carlton	P	1972–1986	2004
Harry Kalas	Broadcaster	1971–2009	2004
Robin Roberts	P	1948–1961	2004
Mike Schmidt	3B	1972–1989	2004
Grover Cleveland Alexander	P	1911–1917, 1930	2005
Bill Campbell	Broadcaster	1963–1970	2005
Del Ennis	OF	1946–1956	2006
Chuck Klein	RF	1928–1933; 1936–1939; 1940–1944	2007
Ed Delahanty	LF	1891–1901	2008
Larry Bowa	SS; Coach; Manager	1970–1981; 2001–2004; 1989–1996; 2014–present	2009
Dick Allen	1B / 3B	1963–1969; 1975–1976	2010
Tug McGraw	P	1975–1984	2010
Curt Simmons	P	1947–1960	2011
Dan Baker	P.A. Announcer	1972–present	2012
Johnny Callison	RF	1960–1969	2012
Greg Luzinski	LF	1970–1980	2013
Bucky Walters	P / 3B	1934–1938	2013
Chief Bender	P	1916–1917	2014
By Saam	Broadcaster	1939–1950; 1955–1975	2014
Curt Schilling	P	1992–2000	2014
Garry Maddox	CF	1975–1986	2015
Sam Thompson	RF	1889–1898	2015
Charlie Manuel	Manager	2005–2013	2016
Chris Short	P	1959–1972	2016
Bob Boone	C	1972–1981	2017
Danny Murtaugh	2B	1941–1943, 1946	2018
Gavvy Cravath	RF; Manager	1912–1920; 1919–1920	2018
Jamie Moyer	P	2006–2010	2018
Paul Owens	GM; Manager	1972–1984; 1972, 1983–1984	2019
Cy Williams	OF	1918–1930	2020
David Montgomery	Executive	1971–2019	2020

=== Team captains ===
- Jimmie Wilson 1927–1928
- Fresco Thompson 1928–1930
- Granny Hamner 1952–1959
- Mike Schmidt 1978–1979

== Minor league affiliations ==
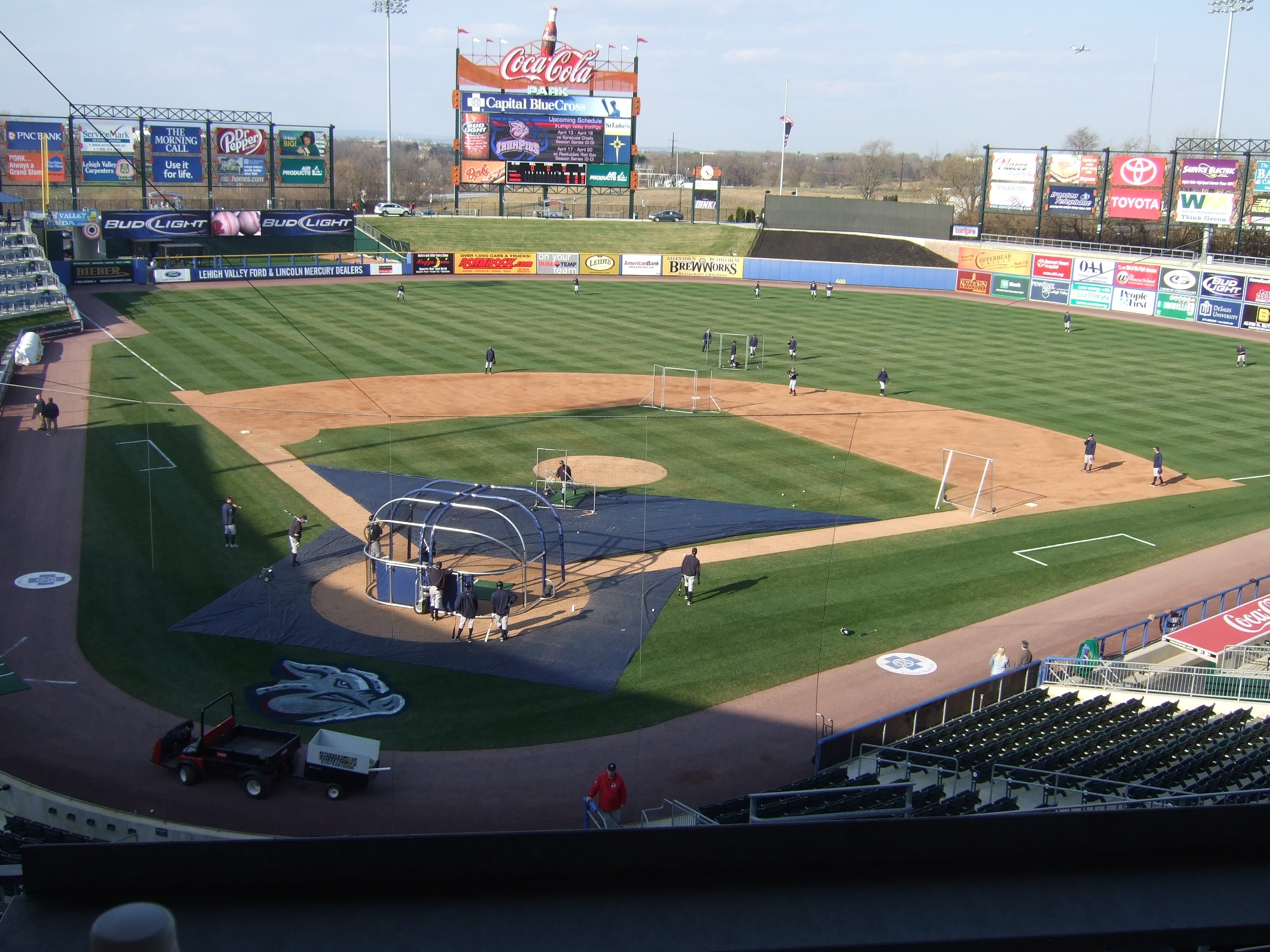
Coca-Cola Park in Allentown, home of the Lehigh Valley IronPigs, the Phillies' Triple-A affiliate

The Philadelphia Phillies farm system consists of six minor league affiliates.

Class	Team	League	Location	Ballpark	Affiliated
Triple-A	Lehigh Valley IronPigs	International League	Allentown, Pennsylvania	Coca-Cola Park	2008
Double-A	Reading Fightin Phils	Eastern League	Reading, Pennsylvania	FirstEnergy Stadium	1967
High-A	Jersey Shore BlueClaws	South Atlantic League	Lakewood, New Jersey	ShoreTown Ballpark	2001
Single-A	Clearwater Threshers	Florida State League	Clearwater, Florida	BayCare Ballpark	1985
Rookie	FCL Phillies	Florida Complex League	Clearwater, Florida	Carpenter Complex	2021
Rookie	DSL Phillies	Dominican Summer League	Santo Domingo, Distrito Nacional	Philadelphia Phillies Complex	2017

== Radio and television ==
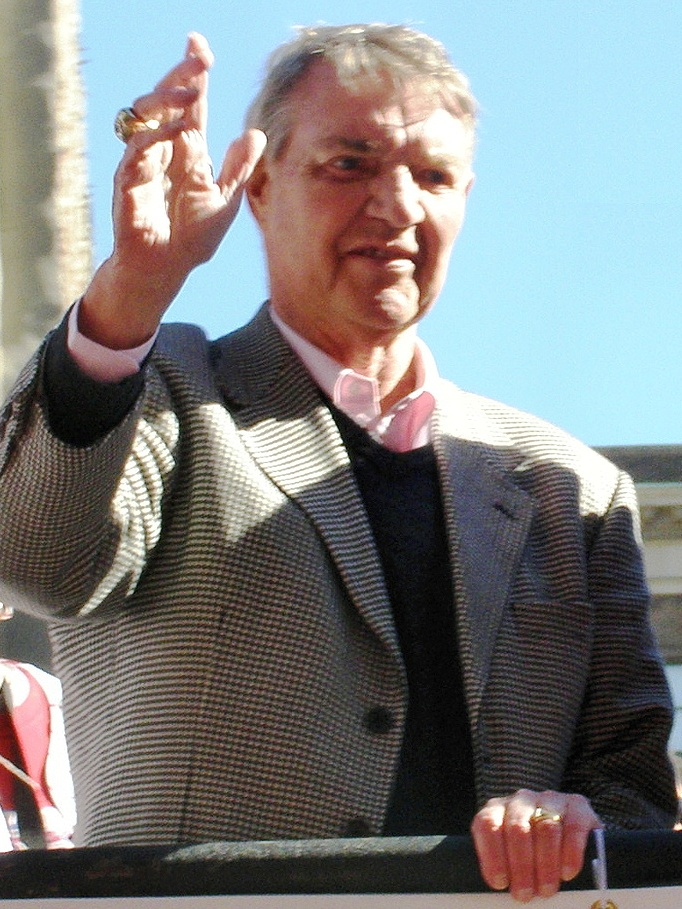
Harry Kalas, Phillies broadcaster from 1971 to 2009 and 2009 Wall of Fame inductee

As of 2024, the Phillies' flagship radio stations is WIP-FM (94.1 FM), formerly owned by CBS Radio, but since November 2017, is owned by Philadelphia-area company Audacy. The broadcasts were discontinued on the former AM flagship station WPHT 1210 in 2016. Scott Franzke provides play-by-play on the radio, with Larry Andersen and Kevin Stocker as color commentators. Meanwhile, NBCUniversal (a unit of Philadelphia-based Comcast) handles local television/streaming broadcasts through its properties NBC Sports Philadelphia/Peacock and WCAU (NBC Channel 10). WCAU broadcasts are syndicated to WHP-DT2 in Harrisburg and WQMY-TV in Wilkes-Barre. Tom McCarthy calls play-by-play for the television broadcasts, with John Kruk, Rubén Amaro Jr., Ben Davis, and Cole Hamels providing color commentary.

Spanish language broadcasts are on WTTM (1680 AM) with Oscar Budejen or Angel Castillo on play-by-play, and Bill Kulik on color commentary.

Other popular Phillies broadcasters through the years include By Saam (1939–1975), Bill Campbell (1962–1970), Richie Ashburn (1963–1997), and Harry Kalas (1971–2009). Kalas, a 2002 recipient of the Ford Frick Award and an icon in the Philadelphia area, called play-by-play in the first three and last three innings on television and the fourth inning on the radio until his death on April 13, 2009.

At Citizens Bank Park, the restaurant built into the base of the main scoreboard is named "Harry the K's" in Kalas' honor. After his death, the Phillies' TV broadcast booth was renamed "The Harry Kalas Broadcast Booth". It is directly next to the radio-broadcast booth, which is named "The Richie 'Whitey' Ashburn Broadcast Booth." When the Phillies win at home, Kalas' rendition of the song "High Hopes," which he would sing when the Phillies had clinched a playoff berth or advanced in the playoffs, is played as fans file out of the stadium. In addition, when a Phillies player hits a home run, a recording of Kalas' famous "That ball is outta here!" home run call is played. The sole exception is Chase Utley, once the subject of another famous Kalas call, "Chase Utley, you are The Man!", which was played when Utley hit a homer.

In 2011, the Phillies unveiled a statue of Harry Kalas at Citizens Bank Park. It was funded by Phillies' fans and designed and constructed by a Phillies' fan.

The Phillies' public-address (PA) announcer is Dan Baker, who started in the 1972 season. He is the longest tenured PA announcer in Major League Baseball

In 2011, the Phillies spent $10 million to upgrade the video system at Citizens Bank Park, including a new display screen in left field, making it the largest in the National League at 76 feet high and 97 feet wide. In 2023, the Phillies once again upgraded their left field display screen by installing a 4K HDR screen that is 77% larger than the previous one, measuring at 86 feet high and 152 feet wide.

== Community ==
=== Charitable contributions ===
Since 1984, the Phillies have supported research related to amyotrophic lateral sclerosis (ALS, also known as Lou Gehrig's disease) with the "Phillies Phestival". The team raised over US$750,000 for ALS research at their 2008 festival, compared with approximately $4,500 at the inaugural event in 1984; the event has raised over $10 million in its history. The ALS Association of Philadelphia is the Phillies' primary charity, and the hospitals they support include Pennsylvania Hospital, Thomas Jefferson University Hospital, and Hahnemann University Hospital. Former Phillies' pitchers Geoff Geary, who lost a friend to the disease, and Curt Schilling, who retired with the Boston Red Sox, are still involved with the Phillies' cause.

=== Education and anti-drug programs ===
The Phillies have a reading incentive program called Phanatic About Reading, which is designed to encourage students from kindergarten to eighth grade to read for a minimum of 15 minutes a night. This reading program is designed to help students with their literacy skills and comprehension. Phillies Phundamentals is another educational program, offered through after-school and summer camps, that is designed to make learning fun and support academic skills by using baseball.

The Phillies celebrate teachers during their annual Teacher Appreciation Night.

The "Cut Out Overdoses" anti-drug campaign, sponsored by Mothers Against Prescription Drug Abuse (MAPDA) and Emergent Biosolutions, manufacturer of the overdose antagonist Narcan, highlights the drug overdose problem through special communications programs at Citizens Bank Park, home of the Phillies. (There are identical programs supported by both the Boston Red Sox and Cincinnati Reds.) In 2020, the stadium, fan-empty due to the coronavirus pandemic, featured "cut-out" cardboard figures of fans filling the stands. Clicking on one of the silhouettes leads to the anguished story of the overdose death of an individual, written by family members. The story also encourages readers to take a stand by learning more about opioid-reversal medication and making a donation to MAPDA. The site reports that an American dies from an accidental opioid overdose every 15 minutes, over 35,000 people annually.

=== Fan support and reputation ===
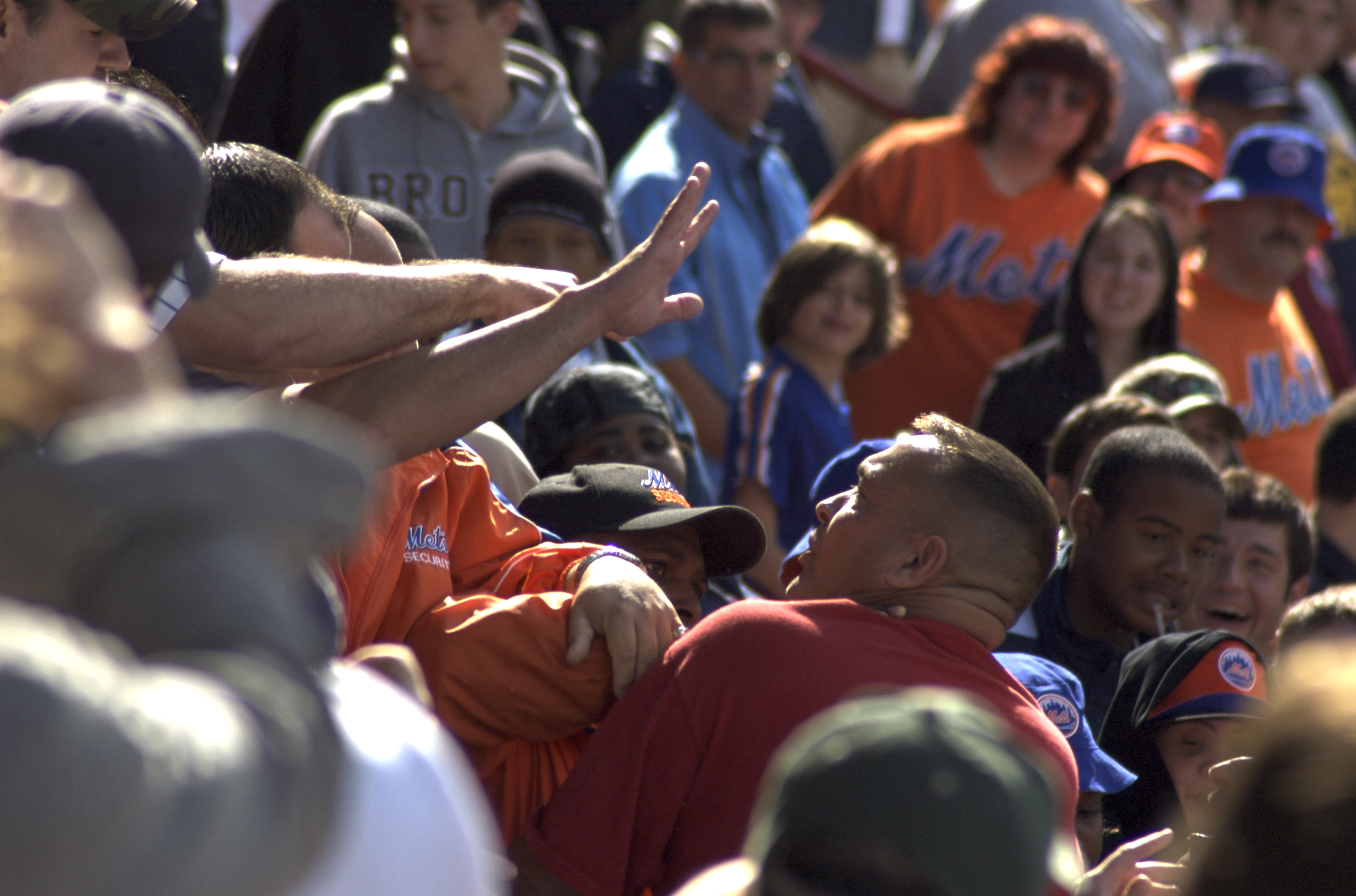
Phillies fans, who have a reputation for occasional unruly behavior, brawl with New York Mets fans at Shea Stadium in September 2007

Phillies' fans have earned a reputation over the years for their occasional unruly behavior. In the 1960s, radio announcers for visiting teams would frequently report on the numerous fights breaking out in Connie Mack Stadium. Immediately after the final game at the old park, many fans ran onto the field or dislodged parts of the ballpark to take home with them. Later, at Veterans Stadium, the 700 Level gained a reputation for its "hostile taunting, fighting, public urination and general strangeness". Phillies fans are famously known for their reputation for being the "Meanest Fans in America".

Phillies' fans are known for harsh criticism of their own stars such the 1964 Rookie of the Year Dick Allen and Hall of Fame third baseman Mike Schmidt. The fans, however, are just as well known for heckling the visiting team. Los Angeles Dodgers pitcher Burt Hooton's poor performance during game three of the 1977 NLCS has often been attributed to the crowd's taunting. J. D. Drew, the Phillies' first overall draft pick in the amateur draft of 1997, never signed with the Phillies following a contract dispute with the team, instead re-entering the draft the next year to be drafted by the St. Louis Cardinals. Phillies fans were angered over this disrespect and hurled debris, including two D batteries, at Drew during an August 1999 game.

Many sportswriters have noted the passionate presence of Phillies fans. Allen Barra wrote that the biggest roar he ever heard from Philadelphia fans was in 1980 when Tug McGraw, in the victory parade after the World Series, told New York fans they could "take this championship and shove it."

When the Phillies moved to Veterans Stadium, they hired a group of young ladies to serve as ushers. These women wore maroon-colored outfits featuring hot pants and were called the Hot Pants Patrol. The team also introduced a pair of mascots attired in colonial garb, named Philadelphia Phil and Phyllis. In addition to costumed characters, animated Phil and Phyllis figures mounted on the center-field facade would "hit" the Liberty Bell after a Phillies home run. This pair of mascots never achieved any significant level of popularity with fans and were eventually discontinued. In 1978, the team introduced a new mascot, the Phillie Phanatic, who has been called "baseball's best mascot", which has been much more successful and has become closely associated with the marketing of the team.

At a game in the 1970s, the Phillies had an Easter Day promotion known as the "highest-jumping Easter Bunny." The plan was for the Easter Bunny, who was given $1,000 and placed in a hot air balloon, to be flown out of Veterans Stadium before the Phillies game. The first fan to find the balloon would get the cash prize. However, the balloon only went three feet in the air before crashing to the ground. As he left the field, the Phillies' fans booed the Easter Bunny.

In Phillies' fan culture, it is also not unusual to replace an "f" with a "ph" in words, such as the Phillie Phanatic. The Heater is the Phillies official cheesesteak, served on game days and at Campo's in Old City.

The club surpassed 100 consecutive sellouts on August 19, 2010, selling out over 50% of their home games and averaging an annual attendance of over 3.1 million fans since moving to Citizens Bank Park; on April 3, 2011, the team broke the three-game series attendance record at the ballpark, having 136,254 fans attend the opening weekend against the Houston Astros.

In 2011 and 2012, the Phillies led the league in attendance with 3,680,718 and 3,565,718 fans, respectively, coming out to watch Phillies baseball.

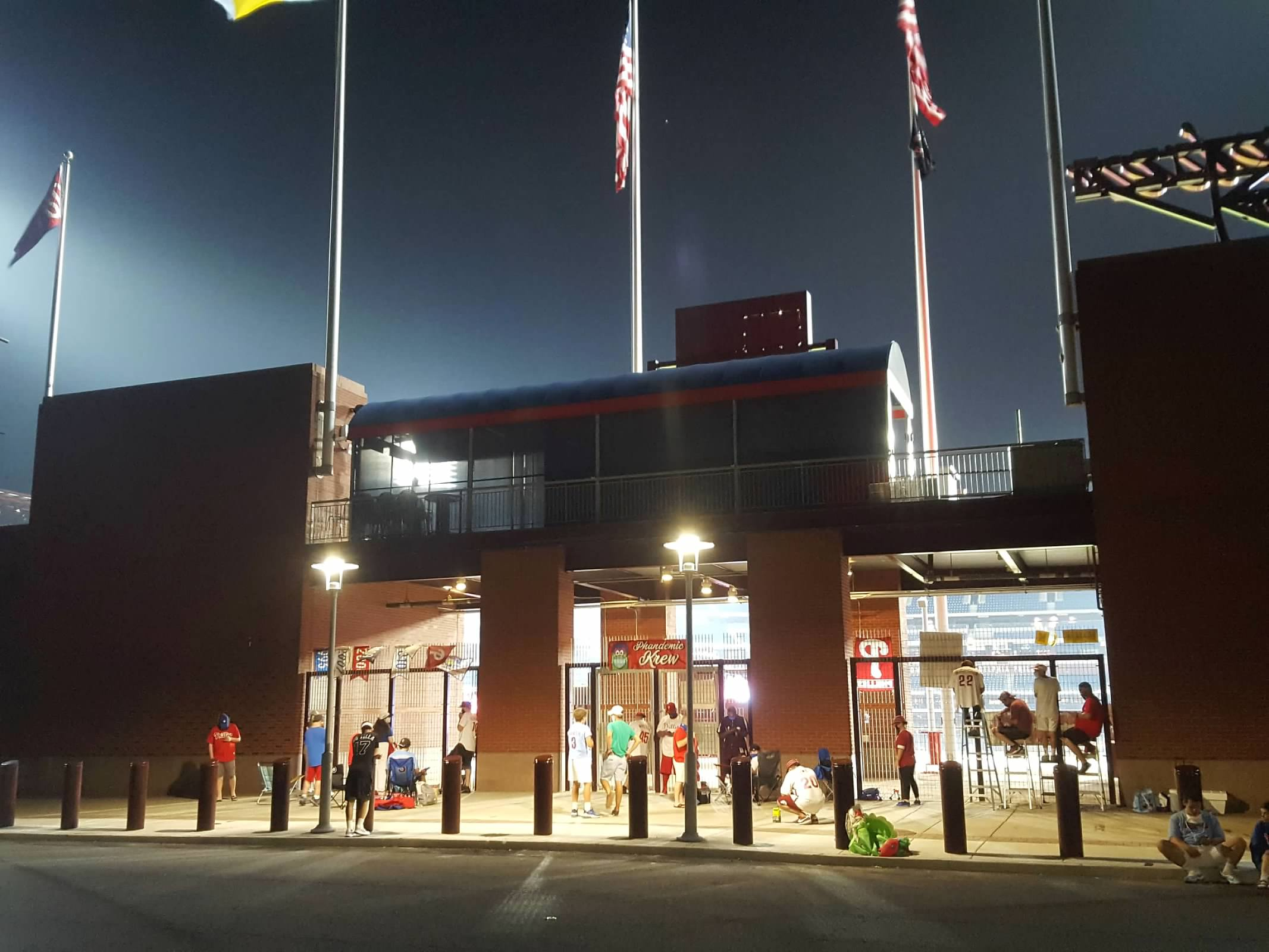
Fans watch Phillies host Baltimore outside Citizens Bank Park on August 11, 2020

During the 2020 season, Citizens Bank Park was closed to fans due to the COVID-19 pandemic. Fans organized a group, the "Phandemic Krew", which gathered behind the center field gate for every game with ladders propped against the gates. The fans' drums, cheers, live applause, and air horns could be heard on live broadcasts and by the players in the empty ballpark.

The Phillies now boast active international support groups on social media, with a Philadelphia Phillies' UK Facebook group starting in August 2015 and UK Phillies' Twitter account created in May 2017. In March 2018 a Phillies' France account launched in French.

== See also ==
- List of Philadelphia Phillies broadcasters
- List of Philadelphia Phillies first-round draft picks
- List of Philadelphia Phillies Opening Day starting pitchers
- List of Philadelphia Phillies seasons
- Sports in Philadelphia

Awards and achievements
Preceded by Pittsburgh Pirates; 1979	World Series champions 1980	Succeeded by Los Angeles Dodgers; 1981
Preceded by Boston Red Sox; 2007	World Series champions 2008	Succeeded by New York Yankees; 2009
Preceded by Boston Braves; 1914	National League champions 1915	Succeeded by Brooklyn Dodgers; 1916
Preceded by Brooklyn Dodgers; 1949	National League champions 1950	Succeeded by New York Giants; 1951
Preceded by Pittsburgh Pirates; 1979	National League champions 1980	Succeeded by Los Angeles Dodgers; 1981
Preceded by St. Louis Cardinals; 1982	National League champions 1983	Succeeded by San Diego Padres; 1984
Preceded by Atlanta Braves; 1991–1992	National League champions 1993	Succeeded by Atlanta Braves; 1995
Preceded by Colorado Rockies; 2007	National League champions 2008–2009	Succeeded by San Francisco Giants; 2010
Preceded by Atlanta Braves; 2021	National League champions 2022	Succeeded by Arizona Diamondbacks; 2023
