= 2025 Philadelphia Phillies season =

Major League Baseball season

2025 Philadelphia Phillies
- National League East champions
- League: National League
- Division: East
- Ballpark: Citizens Bank Park
- City: Philadelphia
- Record: 96–66 (.593)
- Divisional place: 1st
- Owners: John Middleton
- President of baseball operations: Dave Dombrowski
- Managers: Rob Thomson
- Television: NBC Sports Philadelphia; NBC Sports Philadelphia + NBC Philadelphia (Tom McCarthy, Scott Franzke, John Kruk, Ben Davis, Mike Schmidt, Rubén Amaro Jr., Cole Hamels, Taryn Hatcher, Michael Barkann, Ricky Bottalico)
- Radio: Phillies Radio Network; WIP SportsRadio 94.1 FM (English) (Scott Franzke, Larry Andersen, Kevin Stocker, Gregg Murphy); WTTM (Spanish) (Danny Martinez, Bill Kulik, Rickie Ricardo)
- Stats: ESPN.com; Baseball Reference

The 2025 Philadelphia Phillies season was the 143rd season in the history of the franchise, and its 22nd season at Citizens Bank Park.

On June 12, the Phillies trailed the Mets by 5.5 games for the division. However, the Phillies re-took sole possession of first place by June 20. For the next six weeks, the two teams were in a tight divisional race before the Phillies pulled away in early August. On September 14, the Phillies clinched a postseason berth when the San Francisco Giants lost to the Los Angeles Dodgers. The Phillies then clinched their second consecutive NL East title the following day with a 6–5 win against the Dodgers in 10 innings, becoming the first MLB team to clinch a division title.

The Phillies were eliminated in the National League Division Series in four games by the defending and eventual repeat World Series champion Los Angeles Dodgers, their sixth postseason meeting between interdivisional coastal rivals.

The Philadelphia Phillies drew an average home attendance of 41,672, the 4th-highest of all MLB teams.

== Regular season ==
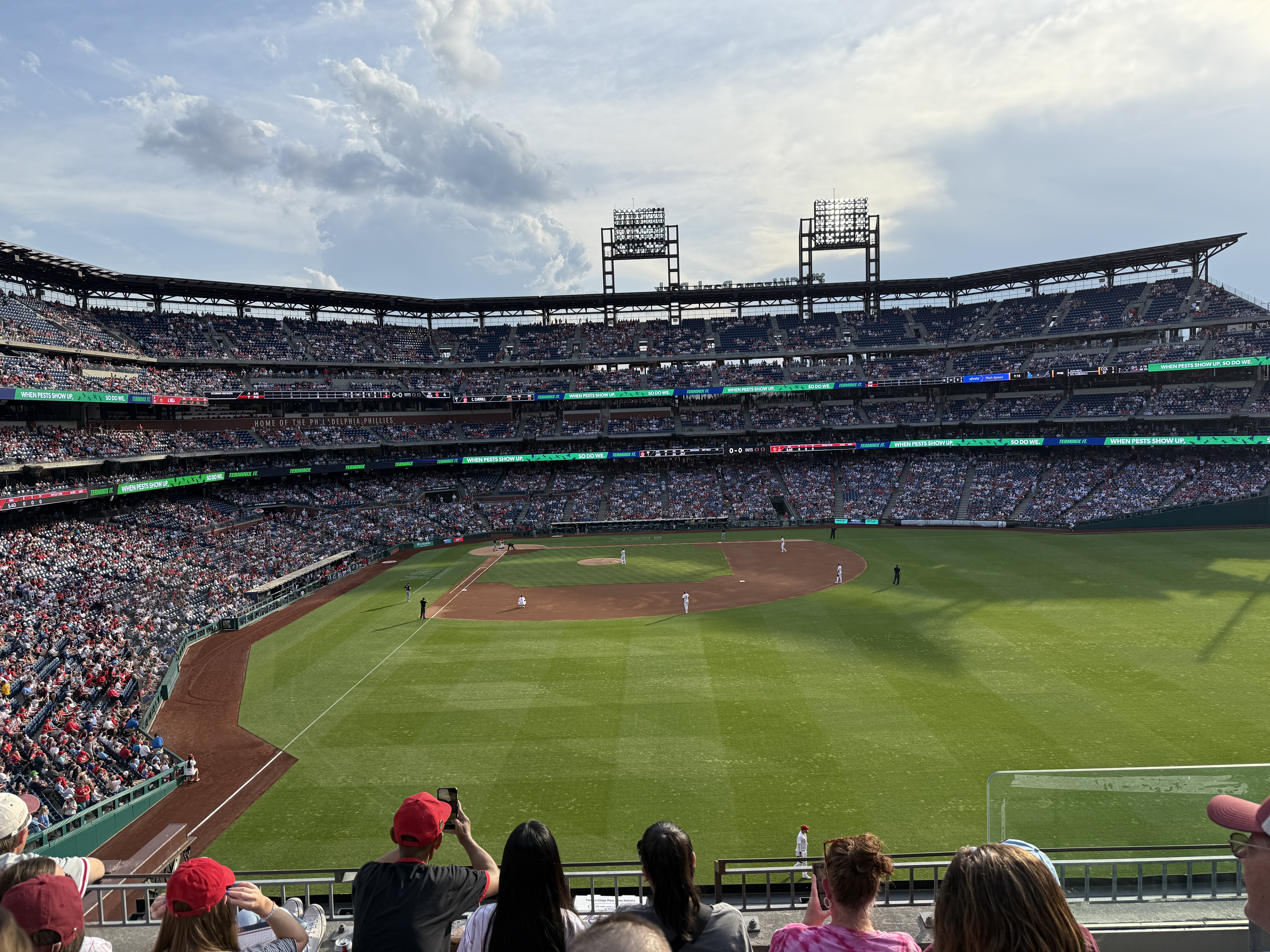
The Phillies take on the Arizona Diamondbacks at Citizens Bank Park on May 3. The Phillies won, 7–2.

=== National League East ===
NL East
| Team | W | L | Pct. | GB | Home | Road |
|---|---|---|---|---|---|---|
| Philadelphia Phillies | 96 | 66 | .593 | — | 55‍–‍26 | 41‍–‍40 |
| New York Mets | 83 | 79 | .512 | 13 | 49‍–‍32 | 34‍–‍47 |
| Miami Marlins | 79 | 83 | .488 | 17 | 38‍–‍43 | 41‍–‍40 |
| Atlanta Braves | 76 | 86 | .469 | 20 | 39‍–‍42 | 37‍–‍44 |
| Washington Nationals | 66 | 96 | .407 | 30 | 32‍–‍49 | 34‍–‍47 |

=== National League Playoff Leaders ===
Division leaders
| Team | W | L | Pct. |
|---|---|---|---|
| Milwaukee Brewers | 97 | 65 | .599 |
| Philadelphia Phillies | 96 | 66 | .593 |
| Los Angeles Dodgers | 93 | 69 | .574 |

Wild Card teams (Top 3 teams qualify for postseason)
| Team | W | L | Pct. | GB |
|---|---|---|---|---|
| Chicago Cubs | 92 | 70 | .568 | +9 |
| San Diego Padres | 90 | 72 | .556 | +7 |
| Cincinnati Reds | 83 | 79 | .512 | — |
| New York Mets | 83 | 79 | .512 | — |
| San Francisco Giants | 81 | 81 | .500 | 2 |
| Arizona Diamondbacks | 80 | 82 | .494 | 3 |
| Miami Marlins | 79 | 83 | .488 | 4 |
| St. Louis Cardinals | 78 | 84 | .481 | 5 |
| Atlanta Braves | 76 | 86 | .469 | 7 |
| Pittsburgh Pirates | 71 | 91 | .438 | 12 |
| Washington Nationals | 66 | 96 | .407 | 17 |
| Colorado Rockies | 43 | 119 | .265 | 40 |

=== Record vs. opponents ===
==== Record vs. National League ====
2025 National League record Source: MLB Standings Grid – 2025
| Team | AZ | ATL | CHC | CIN | COL | LAD | MIA | MIL | NYM | PHI | PIT | SD | SF | STL | WSH | AL |
|---|---|---|---|---|---|---|---|---|---|---|---|---|---|---|---|---|
| Arizona | — | 4–2 | 3–4 | 2–4 | 8–5 | 6–7 | 3–3 | 4–3 | 3–3 | 3–3 | 2–4 | 5–8 | 7–6 | 3–3 | 2–4 | 25–23 |
| Atlanta | 2–4 | — | 2–4 | 5–2 | 4–2 | 1–5 | 8–5 | 2–4 | 8–5 | 5–8 | 2–4 | 1–6 | 1–5 | 4–2 | 9–4 | 22–26 |
| Chicago | 4–3 | 4–2 | — | 5–8 | 5–1 | 4–3 | 4–2 | 7–6 | 2–4 | 2–4 | 10–3 | 3–3 | 1–5 | 8–5 | 3–3 | 30–18 |
| Cincinnati | 4–2 | 2–5 | 8–5 | — | 5–1 | 1–5 | 3–4 | 5–8 | 4–2 | 3–3 | 7–6 | 4–2 | 3–3 | 6–7 | 2–4 | 26–22 |
| Colorado | 5–8 | 2–4 | 1–5 | 1–5 | — | 2–11 | 3–3 | 2–4 | 0–6 | 0–7 | 2–4 | 3–10 | 2–11 | 4–2 | 4–3 | 12–36 |
| Los Angeles | 7–6 | 5–1 | 3–4 | 5–1 | 11–2 | — | 5–1 | 0–6 | 3–4 | 2–4 | 2–4 | 9–4 | 9–4 | 2–4 | 3–3 | 27–21 |
| Miami | 3–3 | 5–8 | 2–4 | 4–3 | 3–3 | 1–5 | — | 3–3 | 7–6 | 4–9 | 4–3 | 3–3 | 4–2 | 3–3 | 7–6 | 26–22 |
| Milwaukee | 3–4 | 4–2 | 6–7 | 8–5 | 4–2 | 6–0 | 3–3 | — | 4–2 | 4–2 | 10–3 | 2–4 | 2–5 | 7–6 | 6–0 | 28–20 |
| New York | 3–3 | 5–8 | 4–2 | 2–4 | 6–0 | 4–3 | 6–7 | 2–4 | — | 7–6 | 2–4 | 2–4 | 4–2 | 5–2 | 7–6 | 24–24 |
| Philadelphia | 3–3 | 8–5 | 4–2 | 3–3 | 7–0 | 4–2 | 9–4 | 2–4 | 6–7 | — | 3–3 | 3–3 | 3–4 | 2–4 | 8–5 | 31–17 |
| Pittsburgh | 4–2 | 4–2 | 3–10 | 6–7 | 4–2 | 4–2 | 3–4 | 3–10 | 4–2 | 3–3 | — | 1–5 | 4–2 | 7–6 | 4–3 | 17–31 |
| San Diego | 8–5 | 6–1 | 3–3 | 2–4 | 10–3 | 4–9 | 3–3 | 4–2 | 4–2 | 3–3 | 5–1 | — | 10–3 | 4–3 | 4–2 | 20–28 |
| San Francisco | 6–7 | 5–1 | 5–1 | 3–3 | 11–2 | 4–9 | 2–4 | 5–2 | 2–4 | 4–3 | 2–4 | 3–10 | — | 2–4 | 3–3 | 24–24 |
| St. Louis | 3–3 | 2–4 | 5–8 | 7–6 | 2–4 | 4–2 | 3–3 | 6–7 | 2–5 | 4–2 | 6–7 | 3–4 | 4–2 | — | 5–1 | 22–26 |
| Washington | 4–2 | 4–9 | 3–3 | 4–2 | 3–4 | 3–3 | 6–7 | 0–6 | 6–7 | 5–8 | 3–4 | 2–4 | 3–3 | 1–5 | — | 19–29 |

Updated with the results of all games through September 28, 2025.

==== Record vs. American League ====
2025 National League record vs. American League Source: MLB Standings
| Team | ATH | BAL | BOS | CWS | CLE | DET | HOU | KC | LAA | MIN | NYY | SEA | TB | TEX | TOR |
|---|---|---|---|---|---|---|---|---|---|---|---|---|---|---|---|
| Arizona | 2–1 | 2–1 | 2–1 | 2–1 | 2–1 | 0–3 | 0–3 | 1–2 | 1–2 | 2–1 | 2–1 | 3–0 | 1–2 | 4–2 | 1–2 |
| Atlanta | 1–2 | 0–3 | 3–3 | 2–1 | 3–0 | 3–0 | 1–2 | 1–2 | 1–2 | 3–0 | 1–2 | 1–2 | 1–2 | 0–3 | 1–2 |
| Chicago | 3–0 | 2–1 | 2–1 | 5–1 | 3–0 | 1–2 | 1–2 | 1–2 | 3–0 | 1–2 | 2–1 | 1–2 | 2–1 | 2–1 | 1–2 |
| Cincinnati | 0–3 | 2–1 | 1–2 | 1–2 | 5–1 | 2–1 | 1–2 | 2–1 | 2–1 | 2–1 | 2–1 | 1–2 | 3–0 | 1–2 | 1–2 |
| Colorado | 1–2 | 1–2 | 0–3 | 1–2 | 1–2 | 0–3 | 2–4 | 0–3 | 2–1 | 2–1 | 1–2 | 0–3 | 1–2 | 0–3 | 0–3 |
| Los Angeles | 2–1 | 1–2 | 1–2 | 3–0 | 2–1 | 3–0 | 0–3 | 2–1 | 0–6 | 2–1 | 2–1 | 3–0 | 2–1 | 2–1 | 2–1 |
| Miami | 1–2 | 2–1 | 1–2 | 1–2 | 1–2 | 2–1 | 1–2 | 2–1 | 2–1 | 2–1 | 3–0 | 1–2 | 3–3 | 3–0 | 1–2 |
| Milwaukee | 2–1 | 2–1 | 3–0 | 2–1 | 1–2 | 2–1 | 2–1 | 2–1 | 3–0 | 4–2 | 0–3 | 2–1 | 1–2 | 0–3 | 2–1 |
| New York | 2–1 | 1–2 | 1–2 | 2–1 | 0–3 | 2–1 | 1–2 | 2–1 | 3–0 | 1–2 | 3–3 | 2–1 | 0–3 | 1–2 | 3–0 |
| Philadelphia | 2–1 | 2–1 | 2–1 | 1–2 | 2–1 | 2–1 | 0–3 | 2–1 | 1–2 | 2–1 | 2–1 | 3–0 | 3–0 | 3–0 | 4–2 |
| Pittsburgh | 2–1 | 0–3 | 2–1 | 0–3 | 0–3 | 4–2 | 1–2 | 0–3 | 2–1 | 1–2 | 1–2 | 0–3 | 1–2 | 1–2 | 2–1 |
| San Diego | 2–1 | 0–3 | 2–1 | 2–1 | 3–0 | 1–2 | 1–2 | 2–1 | 2–1 | 1–2 | 1–2 | 1–5 | 0–3 | 2–1 | 0–3 |
| San Francisco | 5–1 | 2–1 | 2–1 | 1–2 | 1–2 | 0–3 | 3–0 | 1–2 | 1–2 | 0–3 | 2–1 | 3–0 | 1–2 | 2–1 | 0–3 |
| St. Louis | 2–1 | 2–1 | 0–3 | 3–0 | 3–0 | 1–2 | 2–1 | 3–3 | 1–2 | 3–0 | 0–3 | 0–3 | 1–2 | 1–2 | 0–3 |
| Washington | 1–2 | 5–1 | 0–3 | 1–2 | 1–2 | 2–1 | 1–2 | 1–2 | 2–1 | 2–1 | 0–3 | 2–1 | 0–3 | 1–2 | 0–3 |

Updated with the results of all games through September 28, 2025.

== Roster ==
All players who made an appearance for the Phillies during 2025 are included.

2025 Philadelphia Phillies
Roster
| Pitchers: 40 Mick Abel; 46 José Alvarado; 58 Tanner Banks; 31 Walker Buehler; 74 Brett de Geus; 59 Jhoan Durán; 35 Carlos Hernández; 47 Nolan Hoffman; 51 Seth Johnson; 50 Orion Kerkering; 60 Max Lazar; 44 Jesús Luzardo; 54 Tim Mayza; 63 Michael Mercado; 27 Aaron Nola; 56 Alan Rangel; 48 Daniel Robert; 30 David Robertson; 68 Jordan Romano; 41 Joe Ross; 66 José Ruiz; 61 Cristopher Sánchez; 25 Matt Strahm; 55 Ranger Suárez; 57 Lou Trivino; 99 Taijuan Walker; 45 Zack Wheeler | Catchers: 13 Rafael Marchán; 10 J. T. Realmuto; 21 Garrett Stubbs; Infielders: 28 Alec Bohm; 3 Bryce Harper; 4 Otto Kemp; 19 Buddy Kennedy; 33 Edmundo Sosa; 5 Bryson Stott; 7 Trea Turner; 18 Donovan Walton | Outfielders: 2 Harrison Bader; 8 Nick Castellanos; 2 Kody Clemens; 17 Max Kepler; 16 Brandon Marsh; 23 Johan Rojas; 12 Kyle Schwarber; 47 Cal Stevenson; 37 Weston Wilson | Manager: 49 Rob Thomson; Coaches: 95 Mike Calitri (bench); 65 Caleb Cotham (pitching); 96 Bobby Dickerson (infield); 38 Paco Figueroa (first base); 97 Brad Flanders (bullpen catcher); 92 Dustin Lind (assistant hitting); 53 Kevin Long (hitting); 93 Mark Lowy (assistant pitching); 94 Rafael Pena (assistant hitting); 98 Hector Rabago (bullpen catcher); 91 Cesar Ramos (bullpen); 62 Dusty Wathan (third base) |

== Player stats ==
| = Indicates team leader |

| = Indicates league leader |

=== Batting ===
Note: G = Games played; AB = At bats; R = Runs scored; H = Hits; 2B = Doubles; 3B = Triples; HR = Home runs; RBI = Runs batted in; SB = Stolen bases; BB = Walks; AVG = Batting average; SLG = Slugging average

| Player | G | AB | R | H | 2B | 3B | HR | RBI | SB | BB | AVG | SLG |
|---|---|---|---|---|---|---|---|---|---|---|---|---|
| Kyle Schwarber | 162 | 604 | 111 | 145 | 23 | 2 | 56 | 132 | 10 | 108 | .240 | .563 |
| Trea Turner | 141 | 589 | 94 | 179 | 31 | 7 | 15 | 69 | 36 | 43 | .304 | .457 |
| Nick Castellanos | 147 | 547 | 72 | 137 | 27 | 2 | 17 | 72 | 4 | 32 | .250 | .400 |
| J.T. Realmuto | 134 | 502 | 57 | 129 | 26 | 1 | 12 | 52 | 8 | 35 | .257 | .384 |
| Bryce Harper | 132 | 501 | 72 | 131 | 32 | 0 | 27 | 75 | 12 | 70 | .261 | .487 |
| Bryson Stott | 147 | 499 | 66 | 128 | 22 | 3 | 13 | 66 | 24 | 54 | .257 | .391 |
| Alec Bohm | 120 | 464 | 53 | 133 | 18 | 3 | 11 | 59 | 2 | 29 | .287 | .409 |
| Max Kepler | 127 | 417 | 58 | 90 | 19 | 0 | 18 | 52 | 3 | 48 | .216 | .391 |
| Brandon Marsh | 133 | 379 | 59 | 106 | 25 | 2 | 11 | 43 | 7 | 38 | .280 | .443 |
| Edmundo Sosa | 89 | 243 | 30 | 67 | 12 | 1 | 11 | 39 | 1 | 10 | .276 | .469 |
| Otto Kemp | 62 | 197 | 26 | 46 | 11 | 0 | 8 | 28 | 2 | 12 | .234 | .411 |
| Harrison Bader | 50 | 177 | 30 | 54 | 11 | 1 | 5 | 16 | 1 | 12 | .305 | .463 |
| Johan Rojas | 71 | 152 | 23 | 34 | 3 | 2 | 1 | 18 | 12 | 13 | .224 | .289 |
| Weston Wilson | 52 | 111 | 15 | 22 | 4 | 0 | 5 | 17 | 2 | 12 | .198 | .369 |
| Rafael Marchán | 42 | 105 | 9 | 22 | 4 | 0 | 2 | 13 | 0 | 10 | .210 | .305 |
| Donovan Walton | 2 | 8 | 1 | 1 | 0 | 0 | 0 | 1 | 0 | 0 | .125 | .125 |
| Cal Stevenson | 5 | 8 | 0 | 2 | 0 | 0 | 0 | 1 | 0 | 0 | .250 | .250 |
| Buddy Kennedy | 4 | 7 | 0 | 0 | 0 | 0 | 0 | 0 | 0 | 1 | .000 | .000 |
| Kody Clemens | 7 | 6 | 0 | 0 | 0 | 0 | 0 | 0 | 0 | 1 | .000 | .000 |
| Garrett Stubbs | 5 | 1 | 2 | 0 | 0 | 0 | 0 | 0 | 0 | 0 | .000 | .000 |
| Totals | 162 | 5517 | 778 | 1426 | 268 | 24 | 212 | 753 | 124 | 528 | .258 | .431 |

Source:Baseball Reference

=== Pitching ===
Note: W = Wins; L = Losses; ERA = Earned run average; G = Games pitched; GS = Games started; SV = Saves; IP = Innings pitched; H = Hits allowed; R = Runs allowed; ER = Earned runs allowed; BB = Walks allowed; S0 = Strikeouts

| Player | W | L | ERA | G | GS | SV | IP | H | R | ER | BB | SO |
|---|---|---|---|---|---|---|---|---|---|---|---|---|
| Cristopher Sánchez | 13 | 5 | 2.50 | 32 | 32 | 0 | 202.0 | 171 | 58 | 56 | 44 | 212 |
| Jesús Luzardo | 15 | 7 | 3.92 | 32 | 32 | 0 | 183.2 | 167 | 85 | 80 | 57 | 216 |
| Ranger Suárez | 12 | 8 | 3.20 | 26 | 26 | 0 | 157.1 | 154 | 57 | 56 | 38 | 151 |
| Zach Wheeler | 10 | 5 | 2.71 | 24 | 24 | 0 | 149.2 | 107 | 48 | 45 | 33 | 195 |
| Taijuan Walker | 5 | 8 | 4.08 | 34 | 21 | 1 | 123.2 | 132 | 62 | 56 | 42 | 86 |
| Aaron Nola | 5 | 10 | 6.01 | 17 | 17 | 0 | 94.1 | 99 | 65 | 63 | 28 | 97 |
| Tanner Banks | 6 | 2 | 3.07 | 69 | 1 | 1 | 67.1 | 56 | 24 | 23 | 12 | 61 |
| Matt Strahm | 2 | 3 | 2.74 | 66 | 0 | 6 | 62.1 | 47 | 22 | 19 | 20 | 70 |
| Orion Kerkering | 8 | 4 | 3.30 | 69 | 0 | 4 | 60.0 | 55 | 28 | 22 | 27 | 65 |
| Joe Ross | 2 | 1 | 5.12 | 37 | 1 | 0 | 51.0 | 57 | 30 | 29 | 18 | 39 |
| Jordan Romano | 2 | 4 | 8.23 | 49 | 0 | 8 | 42.2 | 45 | 40 | 39 | 17 | 47 |
| Max Lazar | 1 | 1 | 4.79 | 36 | 0 | 1 | 41.1 | 41 | 23 | 22 | 12 | 26 |
| José Alvarado | 4 | 2 | 3.81 | 28 | 0 | 7 | 26.0 | 27 | 12 | 11 | 7 | 32 |
| Carlos Hernández | 1 | 0 | 5.26 | 25 | 0 | 0 | 25.2 | 32 | 16 | 15 | 13 | 23 |
| Mick Abel | 2 | 2 | 5.04 | 6 | 6 | 0 | 25.0 | 25 | 14 | 14 | 9 | 21 |
| Jhoan Durán | 1 | 2 | 2.18 | 23 | 0 | 16 | 20.2 | 18 | 6 | 5 | 1 | 27 |
| David Robertson | 2 | 0 | 4.08 | 20 | 0 | 2 | 17.2 | 18 | 9 | 8 | 8 | 22 |
| José Ruiz | 1 | 0 | 8.16 | 16 | 0 | 0 | 14.1 | 21 | 14 | 13 | 6 | 12 |
| Walker Buehler | 3 | 0 | 0.66 | 3 | 2 | 0 | 13.2 | 10 | 1 | 1 | 6 | 8 |
| Daniel Robert | 0 | 0 | 4.15 | 15 | 0 | 0 | 13.0 | 11 | 7 | 6 | 10 | 15 |
| Seth Johnson | 1 | 1 | 4.26 | 10 | 0 | 0 | 12.2 | 11 | 8 | 6 | 4 | 17 |
| Alan Rangel | 0 | 0 | 2.45 | 5 | 0 | 1 | 11.0 | 10 | 3 | 3 | 6 | 8 |
| Lou Trivino | 0 | 1 | 2.00 | 10 | 0 | 0 | 9.0 | 6 | 3 | 2 | 5 | 8 |
| Tim Mayza | 0 | 0 | 4.91 | 8 | 0 | 0 | 7.1 | 8 | 4 | 4 | 4 | 7 |
| Weston Wilson | 0 | 0 | 0.00 | 2 | 0 | 0 | 3.0 | 3 | 0 | 0 | 0 | 0 |
| Michael Mercado | 0 | 0 | 15.00 | 3 | 0 | 0 | 3.0 | 7 | 5 | 5 | 4 | 4 |
| Brett de Geus | 0 | 0 | 4.50 | 1 | 0 | 0 | 2.0 | 1 | 1 | 1 | 3 | 0 |
| Nolan Hoffman | 0 | 0 | 27.00 | 1 | 0 | 0 | 1.0 | 3 | 3 | 3 | 1 | 2 |
| Totals | 96 | 66 | 3.79 | 162 | 162 | 47 | 1440.1 | 1342 | 648 | 607 | 435 | 1471 |

Source:Baseball Reference

== Game log ==
=== Regular season ===
Legend
| | Phillies win |
| | Phillies loss |
| | Postponement |
| | Clinched playoff spot |
| | Clinched division |
| **Bold** | Phillies team member |

2025 Game Log: 96–66 (Home: 55–26; Away: 41–40)
March/April: 17–13 (Home: 11–4; Away: 6–9)

| # | Date | Opponent | Score | Win | Loss | Save | Attendance | Record |
|---|---|---|---|---|---|---|---|---|
| 1 | March 27 | @ Nationals | 7–3 (10) | **José Alvarado** (1–0) | Colin Poche (0–1) | — | 41,231 | 1–0 |
| 2 | March 29 | @ Nationals | 11–6 | **Jesús Luzardo** (1–0) | Colin Poche (0–2) | — | 38,446 | 2–0 |
| 3 | March 30 | @ Nationals | 1–5 | Mitchell Parker (1–0) | **Aaron Nola** (0–1) | Kyle Finnegan (1) | 28,075 | 2–1 |
| 4 | March 31 | Rockies | 6–1 | **Joe Ross** (1–0) | Scott Alexander (0–1) | — | 44,595 | 3–1 |
| 5 | April 2 | Rockies | 5–1 | **Zack Wheeler** (1–0) | Kyle Freeland (0–1) | — | 37,550 | 4–1 |
| 6 | April 3 | Rockies | 3–1 | **Taijuan Walker** (1–0) | Antonio Senzatela (0–1) | **José Alvarado** (1) | 34,097 | 5–1 |
| 7 | April 4 | Dodgers | 3–2 | **Jesús Luzardo** (2–0) | Yoshinobu Yamamoto (1–1) | **Jordan Romano** (1) | 43,024 | 6–1 |
| 8 | April 5 | Dodgers | 1–3 | Anthony Banda (3–0) | **Aaron Nola** (0–2) | Tanner Scott (3) | 44,404 | 6–2 |
| 9 | April 6 | Dodgers | 8–7 | **Orion Kerkering** (1–0) | Blake Treinen (0–1) | **José Alvarado** (2) | 44,098 | 7–2 |
| 10 | April 8 | @ Braves | 5–7 | Daysbel Hernández (1–0) | **Orion Kerkering** (1–1) | Raisel Iglesias (1) | 33,508 | 7–3 |
| 11 | April 9 | @ Braves | 4–3 | **José Alvarado** (2–0) | Raisel Iglesias (0–2) | — | 35,323 | 8–3 |
| 12 | April 10 | @ Braves | 2–4 (11) | José Suárez (1–0) | **Joe Ross** (1–1) | — | 36,630 | 8–4 |
| 13 | April 11 | @ Cardinals | 0–2 | Andre Pallante (2–0) | **Aaron Nola** (0–3) | Ryan Helsley (2) | 32,309 | 8–5 |
| 14 | April 12 | @ Cardinals | 4–1 | **Cristopher Sánchez** (1–0) | Miles Mikolas (0–2) | **José Alvarado** (3) | 30,791 | 9–5 |
| 15 | April 13 | @ Cardinals | 0–7 | Matthew Liberatore (1–1) | **Zack Wheeler** (1–1) | — | 32,509 | 9–6 |
| 16 | April 14 | Giants | 4–10 | Landen Roupp (1–1) | **Taijuan Walker** (1–1) | — | 40,636 | 9–7 |
| 17 | April 15 | Giants | 6–4 | **Orion Kerkering** (2–1) | Justin Verlander (0–1) | **Matt Strahm** (1) | 38,119 | 10–7 |
| 18 | April 16 | Giants | 4–11 | Lou Trivino (1–0) | **Aaron Nola** (0–4) | — | 38,532 | 10–8 |
| 19 | April 17 | Giants | 6–4 | **Cristopher Sánchez** (2–0) | Jordan Hicks (1–2) | **José Alvarado** (4) | 41,321 | 11–8 |
| 20 | April 18 | Marlins | 7–2 | **Zack Wheeler** (2–1) | Sandy Alcántara (2–1) | — | 44,949 | 12–8 |
| 21 | April 19 | Marlins | 11–10 | **Matt Strahm** (1–0) | Cal Quantrill (1–2) | **José Alvarado** (5) | 45,045 | 13–8 |
| 22 | April 20 | Marlins | 5–7 (10) | Calvin Faucher (1–1) | **Matt Strahm** (1–1) | Jesús Tinoco (1) | 45,079 | 13–9 |
| 23 | April 21 | @ Mets | 4–5 | Tylor Megill (3–2) | **Aaron Nola** (0–5) | Edwin Díaz (6) | 35,430 | 13–10 |
| 24 | April 22 | @ Mets | 1–5 | Griffin Canning (3–1) | **Cristopher Sánchez** (2–1) | — | 36,468 | 13–11 |
| 25 | April 23 | @ Mets | 3–4 (10) | Max Kranick (2–0) | **Jordan Romano** (0–1) | — | 36,863 | 13–12 |
| 26 | April 25 | @ Cubs | 0–4 | Colin Rea (1–0) | **Taijuan Walker** (1–2) | — | 32,880 | 13–13 |
| 27 | April 26 | @ Cubs | 10–4 | **Jesús Luzardo** (3–0) | Ben Brown (2–2) | — | 40,068 | 14–13 |
| 28 | April 27 | @ Cubs | 3–1 (10) | **José Alvarado** (3–0) | Julian Merryweather (0–1) | **Jordan Romano** (2) | 35,761 | 15–13 |
| 29 | April 29 | Nationals | 7–6 | **Orion Kerkering** (3–1) | Kyle Finnegan (0–1) | — | 38,387 | 16–13 |
| 30 | April 30 | Nationals | 7–2 | **Cristopher Sánchez** (3–1) | Jake Irvin (2–1) | — | 37,713 | 17–13 |

May: 19–9 (Home: 8–7; Away: 11–2)

| # | Date | Opponent | Score | Win | Loss | Save | Attendance | Record |
|---|---|---|---|---|---|---|---|---|
| 31 | May 1 | Nationals | 2–4 | Brad Lord (1–3) | **Taijuan Walker** (1–3) | Kyle Finnegan (10) | 37,069 | 17–14 |
| 32 | May 2 | Diamondbacks | 3–2 | **Tanner Banks** (1–0) | José Castillo (0–1) | **José Alvarado** (6) | 40,133 | 18–14 |
| 33 | May 3 | Diamondbacks | 7–2 | **Aaron Nola** (1–5) | Brandon Pfaadt (5–2) | — | 42,650 | 19–14 |
| 34 | May 4 | Diamondbacks | 9–11 (10) | Shelby Miller (3–0) | **José Alvarado** (3–1) | Jalen Beeks (1) | 44,010 | 19–15 |
| 35 | May 6 | @ Rays | 8–4 | **Zack Wheeler** (3–1) | Drew Rasmussen (1–3) | — | 10,046 | 20–15 |
| 36 | May 7 | @ Rays | 7–0 | **Cristopher Sánchez** (4–1) | Shane Baz (3–2) | **Taijuan Walker** (1) | 10,046 | 21–15 |
| 37 | May 8 | @ Rays | 7–6 (10) | **José Alvarado** (4–1) | Manuel Rodríguez (0–1) | **Matt Strahm** (2) | 10,046 | 22–15 |
| 38 | May 9 | @ Guardians | 0–6 | Gavin Williams (3–2) | **Aaron Nola** (1–6) | — | 25,328 | 22–16 |
| 39 | May 10 | @ Guardians | 7–1 | **Ranger Suárez** (1–0) | Tanner Bibee (3–3) | — | 34,782 | 23–16 |
| 40 | May 11 | @ Guardians | 3–0 | **Zack Wheeler** (4–1) | Luis Ortiz (2–4) | **Jordan Romano** (3) | 20,304 | 24–16 |
| 41 | May 12 | Cardinals | 2–3 | Kyle Leahy (1–0) | **Matt Strahm** (1–2) | Ryan Helsley (8) | 42,513 | 24–17 |
| – | May 13 | Cardinals | Postponed (rain); Makeup: May 14 as a split double-header | | | | | |
| 42 | May 14 (1) | Cardinals | 2–1 | **Jesús Luzardo** (4–0) | Steven Matz (2–1) | **Jordan Romano** (4) | 40,773 | 25–17 |
| 43 | May 14 (2) | Cardinals | 7–14 | Chris Roycroft (1–2) | **Aaron Nola** (1–7) | — | 35,150 | 25–18 |
| 44 | May 16 | Pirates | 8–4 | **Ranger Suárez** (2–0) | Ryan Borucki (0–1) | **José Alvarado** (7) | 44,039 | 26–18 |
| 45 | May 17 | Pirates | 5–2 | **Zack Wheeler** (5–1) | Carmen Mlodzinski (1–4) | — | 44,164 | 27–18 |
| 46 | May 18 | Pirates | 1–0 | **Mick Abel** (1–0) | Paul Skenes (3–5) | **Jordan Romano** (5) | 44,356 | 28–18 |
| 47 | May 19 | @ Rockies | 9–3 | **Joe Ross** (2–1) | Seth Halvorsen (0–1) | — | 23,487 | 29–18 |
| 48 | May 20 | @ Rockies | 7–4 | **Jesús Luzardo** (5–0) | Antonio Senzatela (1–8) | — | 24,431 | 30–18 |
| 49 | May 21 | @ Rockies | 9–5 | **Taijuan Walker** (2–3) | Carson Palmquist (0–2) | — | 23,421 | 31–18 |
| 50 | May 22 | @ Rockies | 2–0 | **Ranger Suárez** (3–0) | Germán Márquez (1–7) | **Jordan Romano** (6) | 23,308 | 32–18 |
| 51 | May 23 | @ Athletics | 4–3 | **Zack Wheeler** (6–1) | Jacob Lopez (0–2) | **Tanner Banks** (1) | 10,052 | 33–18 |
| 52 | May 24 | @ Athletics | 9–6 (11) | **Orion Kerkering** (4–1) | Mitch Spence (1–1) | **Max Lazar** (1) | 10,090 | 34–18 |
| 53 | May 25 | @ Athletics | 4–5 | Tyler Ferguson (1–2) | **Matt Strahm** (1–3) | Mason Miller (12) | 10,068 | 34–19 |
| 54 | May 27 | Braves | 2–0 | **Ranger Suárez** (4–0) | Spencer Strider (0–3) | **Jordan Romano** (7) | 40,627 | 35–19 |
| ― | May 28 | Braves | Postponed (rain); Makeup: May 29 as a split double-header | | | | | |
| 55 | May 29 (1) | Braves | 5–4 | **José Ruiz** (1–0) | Daysbel Hernández (3–1) | **Jordan Romano** (8) | 32,314 | 36–19 |
| 56 | May 29 (2) | Braves | 3–9 | Chris Sale (3–3) | **Zack Wheeler** (6–2) | — | 42,739 | 36–20 |
| 57 | May 30 | Brewers | 2–6 | Quinn Priester (2–2) | **Taijuan Walker** (2–4) | — | 41,546 | 36–21 |
| 58 | May 31 | Brewers | 7–17 | Chad Patrick (3–4) | **Jesús Luzardo** (5–1) | — | 43,773 | 36–22 |

June: 14–13 (Home: 8–3; Away: 6–10)

| # | Date | Opponent | Score | Win | Loss | Save | Attendance | Record |
|---|---|---|---|---|---|---|---|---|
| 59 | June 1 | Brewers | 2–5 | Nick Mears (1–0) | **Orion Kerkering** (4–2) | Trevor Megill (11) | 44,076 | 36–23 |
| 60 | June 3 | @ Blue Jays | 8–3 | **Cristopher Sánchez** (5–1) | Bowden Francis (2–6) | — | 32,632 | 37–23 |
| 61 | June 4 | @ Blue Jays | 1–2 | Jeff Hoffman (5–2) | **Jordan Romano** (0–2) | — | 25,716 | 37–24 |
| 62 | June 5 | @ Blue Jays | 1–9 | Chris Bassitt (6–3) | **Jesús Luzardo** (5–2) | — | 33,728 | 37–25 |
| 63 | June 6 | @ Pirates | 4–5 | David Bednar (1–4) | **Jordan Romano** (0–3) | — | 23,243 | 37–26 |
| 64 | June 7 | @ Pirates | 1–2 | Isaac Mattson (1–0) | **Ranger Suárez** (4–1) | David Bednar (8) | 32,951 | 37–27 |
| 65 | June 8 | @ Pirates | 1–2 | Braxton Ashcraft (1–0) | **Cristopher Sánchez** (5–2) | — | 25,261 | 37–28 |
| 66 | June 9 | Cubs | 4–3 (11) | **Carlos Hernández** (1–0) | Daniel Palencia (0–2) | — | 41,266 | 38–28 |
| 67 | June 10 | Cubs | 4–8 | Caleb Thielbar (2–1) | **Taijuan Walker** (2–5) | — | 41,220 | 38–29 |
| 68 | June 11 | Cubs | 7–2 | **Jesús Luzardo** (5–2) | Ben Brown (3–5) | — | 42,660 | 39–29 |
| 69 | June 13 | Blue Jays | 8–0 | **Ranger Suárez** (5–1) | Kevin Gausman (5–5) | — | 40,596 | 40–29 |
| 70 | June 14 | Blue Jays | 3–2 | **Orion Kerkering** (5–2) | Chad Green (2–2) | **Matt Strahm** (3) | 43,711 | 41–29 |
| 71 | June 15 | Blue Jays | 11–4 | **Zack Wheeler** (7–2) | José Berríos (2–3) | — | 44,681 | 42–29 |
| 72 | June 16 | @ Marlins | 5–2 | **Mick Abel** (2–0) | Sandy Alcántara (3–8) | **Orion Kerkering** (1) | 9,898 | 43–29 |
| 73 | June 17 | @ Marlins | 3–8 | Freddy Tarnok (1–0) | **Jesús Luzardo** (6–3) | — | 8,300 | 43–30 |
| 74 | June 18 | @ Marlins | 4–2 | **Ranger Suárez** (6–1) | Adam Mazur (0–1) | **Matt Strahm** (4) | 9,570 | 44–30 |
| 75 | June 19 | @ Marlins | 2–1 | **Cristopher Sánchez** (6–2) | Anthony Bender (1–5) | **Orion Kerkering** (2) | 10,411 | 45–30 |
| 76 | June 20 | Mets | 10–2 | **Tanner Banks** (2–0) | Reed Garrett (2–3) | — | 44,432 | 46–30 |
| 77 | June 21 | Mets | 4–11 | Griffin Canning (7–3) | **Mick Abel** (2–1) | — | 44,687 | 46–31 |
| 78 | June 22 | Mets | 7–1 | **Jesús Luzardo** (7–3) | David Peterson (5–3) | — | 42,155 | 47–31 |
| 79 | June 24 | @ Astros | 0–1 | Bryan Abreu (2–3) | **Ranger Suárez** (6–2) | Josh Hader (20) | 31,245 | 47–32 |
| 80 | June 25 | @ Astros | 0–2 | Colton Gordon (3–1) | **Zack Wheeler** (7–3) | Josh Hader (21) | 28,826 | 47–33 |
| 81 | June 26 | @ Astros | 1–2 | Bryan Abreu (3–3) | **Orion Kerkering** (5–3) | — | 37,130 | 47–34 |
| 82 | June 27 | @ Braves | 13–0 | **Taijuan Walker** (3–5) | Bryce Elder (2–5) | **Alan Rangel** (1) | 40,753 | 48–34 |
| 83 | June 28 | @ Braves | 1–6 | Spencer Schwellenbach (7–4) | **Jesús Luzardo** (7–4) | — | 41,751 | 48–35 |
| 84 | June 29 | @ Braves | 2–1 | **Ranger Suárez** (7–2) | Spencer Strider (3–6) | **Matt Strahm** (5) | 35,792 | 49–35 |
| 85 | June 30 | Padres | 4–0 | **Zack Wheeler** (8–3) | Matt Waldron (0–1) | — | 43,138 | 50–35 |

July: 11–12 (Home: 6–5; Away: 5–7)

| # | Date | Opponent | Score | Win | Loss | Save | Attendance | Record |
|---|---|---|---|---|---|---|---|---|
| ― | July 1 | Padres | Postponed (rain); Makeup: July 2 as a split double-header | | | | | |
| 86 | July 2 (1) | Padres | 4–6 | Nick Pivetta (9–2) | **Mick Abel** (2–2) | Robert Suárez (24) | 40,144 | 50–36 |
| 87 | July 2 (2) | Padres | 5–1 | **Cristopher Sánchez** (7–2) | Dylan Cease (3–8) | — | 40,742 | 51–36 |
| 88 | July 4 | Reds | 6–9 | Sam Moll (1–0) | **Jesús Luzardo** (7–5) | Emilio Pagán (19) | 42,166 | 51–37 |
| 89 | July 5 | Reds | 5–1 | **Jordan Romano** (1–3) | Nick Lodolo (5–6) | — | 42,045 | 52–37 |
| 90 | July 6 | Reds | 3–1 | **Zack Wheeler** (9–3) | Tony Santillan (1–2) | — | 42,055 | 53–37 |
| 91 | July 7 | @ Giants | 1–3 | Tyler Rogers (4–2) | **Orion Kerkering** (5–4) | Camilo Doval (14) | 40,043 | 53–38 |
| 92 | July 8 | @ Giants | 3–4 | Ryan Walker (2–3) | **Jordan Romano** (1–4) | — | 40,212 | 53–39 |
| 93 | July 9 | @ Giants | 13–0 | **Jesús Luzardo** (8–5) | Justin Verlander (0–7) | — | 37,334 | 54–39 |
| 94 | July 11 | @ Padres | 2–4 | Jeremiah Estrada (3–4) | **Ranger Suárez** (7–3) | Robert Suárez (28) | 43,856 | 54–40 |
| 95 | July 12 | @ Padres | 4–5 | David Morgan (1–1) | **Tanner Banks** (2–1) | Jeremiah Estrada (3) | 43,444 | 54–41 |
| 96 | July 13 | @ Padres | 2–1 | **Cristopher Sánchez** (8–2) | Adrián Morejón (7–4) | **Matt Strahm** (6) | 43,398 | 55–41 |
| – | July 15 | **2025 Major League Baseball All-Star Game at Truist Park in Cumberland, Georgia** | | | | | | |
| 97 | July 18 | Angels | 5–6 | Sam Bachman (2–2) | **Tanner Banks** (2–2) | Kenley Jansen (17) | 44,482 | 55–42 |
| 98 | July 19 | Angels | 9–5 | **Seth Johnson** (1–0) | Sam Bachman (2–3) | — | 43,124 | 56–42 |
| 99 | July 20 | Angels | 2–8 | José Soriano (7–7) | **Ranger Suárez** (7–4) | — | 40,616 | 56–43 |
| 100 | July 21 | Red Sox | 3–2 (10) | **Max Lazar** (1–0) | Jordan Hicks (1–6) | — | 42,843 | 57–43 |
| 101 | July 22 | Red Sox | 4–1 | **Cristopher Sánchez** (9–2) | Richard Fitts (1–4) | — | 43,409 | 58–43 |
| 102 | July 23 | Red Sox | 8–9 (11) | Greg Weissert (3–3) | **Seth Johnson** (1–1) | Brennan Bernardino (1) | 42,601 | 58–44 |
| 103 | July 25 | @ Yankees | 12–5 | **Tanner Banks** (3–2) | Tim Hill (3–3) | — | 47,018 | 59–44 |
| 104 | July 26 | @ Yankees | 9–4 | **Ranger Suárez** (8–4) | Marcus Stroman (2–2) | — | 46,621 | 60–44 |
| 105 | July 27 | @ Yankees | 3–4 | Carlos Rodón (11–7) | **Zack Wheeler** (9–4) | Devin Williams (16) | 45,612 | 60–45 |
| 106 | July 28 | @ White Sox | 2–6 | Davis Martin (3–8) | **Cristopher Sánchez** (9–3) | — | 15,106 | 60–46 |
| 107 | July 29 | @ White Sox | 6–3 | **Jesús Luzardo** (9–5) | Jonathan Cannon (4–8) | — | 20,730 | 61–46 |
| 108 | July 30 | @ White Sox | 3–9 | Mike Vasil (5–3) | **Max Lazar** (1–1) | — | 12,718 | 61–47 |

August: 18–11 (Home: 12–4; Away: 6–7)

| # | Date | Opponent | Score | Win | Loss | Save | Attendance | Record |
|---|---|---|---|---|---|---|---|---|
| 109 | August 1 | Tigers | 5–4 | **Orion Kerkering** (6–4) | Brenan Hanifee (3–3) | **Jhoan Durán** (17) | 43,421 | 62–47 |
| 110 | August 2 | Tigers | 5–7 | Tarik Skubal (11–3) | **Zach Wheeler** (9–5) | Kyle Finnegan (21) | 44,689 | 62–48 |
| 111 | August 3 | Tigers | 2–0 | **Cristopher Sánchez** (10–3) | Charlie Morton (7–9) | **Jhoan Durán** (18) | 41,569 | 63–48 |
| 112 | August 4 | Orioles | 13–3 | **Jesús Luzardo** (10–4) | Cade Povich (2–6) | — | 41,099 | 64–48 |
| 113 | August 5 | Orioles | 5–0 | **Taijuan Walker** (4–5) | Dean Kremer (8–8) | — | 43,660 | 65–48 |
| 114 | August 6 | Orioles | 1–5 | Trevor Rogers (5–2) | **Ranger Suárez** (8–5) | — | 42,030 | 65–49 |
| 115 | August 8 | @ Rangers | 9–1 | **Cristopher Sánchez** (11–3) | Merrill Kelly (9–7) | — | 27,575 | 66–49 |
| 116 | August 9 | @ Rangers | 3–2 | **Jesús Luzardo** (11–5) | Jacob deGrom (10–5) | **Jhoan Durán** (19) | 38,471 | 67–49 |
| 117 | August 10 | @ Rangers | 4–2 | **Zack Wheeler** (10–5) | Patrick Corbin (6–8) | **Jhoan Durán** (20) | 32,444 | 68–49 |
| 118 | August 11 | @ Reds | 4–1 | **Jordan Romano** (2–4) | Andrew Abbott (8–3) | **Orion Kerkering** (3) | 43,800 | 69–49 |
| 119 | August 12 | @ Reds | 1–6 | Brady Singer (10–9) | **Ranger Suárez** (8–6) | — | 29,654 | 69–50 |
| 120 | August 13 | @ Reds | 0–8 | Hunter Greene (5–3) | **Cristopher Sánchez** (11–4) | — | 25,869 | 69–51 |
| 121 | August 14 | @ Nationals | 2–3 | Shinnosuke Ogasawara (1–1) | **Jesús Luzardo** (11–6) | Cole Henry (1) | 21,609 | 69–52 |
| 122 | August 15 | @ Nationals | 6–2 | **Tanner Banks** (4–2) | Clayton Beeter (0–2) | — | 35,143 | 70–52 |
| 123 | August 16 | @ Nationals | 0–2 | Cade Cavalli (1–0) | **Taijuan Walker** (4–6) | José A. Ferrer (2) | 36,042 | 70–53 |
| 124 | August 17 | @ Nationals | 11–9 | **Tanner Banks** (5–2) | PJ Poulin (0–1) | **Jhoan Durán** (21) | 26,243 | 71–53 |
| 125 | August 18 | Mariners | 12–7 | **Ranger Suárez** (9–6) | Logan Gilbert (3–5) | — | 44,471 | 72–53 |
| 126 | August 19 | Mariners | 6–4 | **David Robertson** (1–0) | Matt Brash (1–2) | **Jhoan Durán** (22) | 43,757 | 73–53 |
| 127 | August 20 | Mariners | 11–2 | **Jesús Luzardo** (12–6) | Luis Castillo (8–7) | — | 38,331 | 74–53 |
| 128 | August 22 | Nationals | 4–5 | PJ Poulin (1–1) | **Jhoan Durán** (6–5) | — | 44,757 | 74–54 |
| 129 | August 23 | Nationals | 6–4 | **Aaron Nola** (2–7) | Mitchell Parker (7–14) | **Jhoan Durán** (23) | 44,771 | 75–54 |
| 130 | August 24 | Nationals | 3–2 | **Ranger Suárez** (10–6) | Jake Irvin (8–9) | **Orion Kerkering** (4) | 42,580 | 76–54 |
| 131 | August 25 | @ Mets | 3–13 | José Castillo (1–2) | **Cristopher Sánchez** (11–4) | — | 41,983 | 76–55 |
| 132 | August 26 | @ Mets | 5–6 | Edwin Díaz (6–2) | **Jhoan Durán** (6–6) | — | 41,914 | 76–56 |
| 133 | August 27 | @ Mets | 0–6 | Nick McLean (3–0) | **Taijuan Walker** (4–7) | — | 41,893 | 76–57 |
| 134 | August 28 | Braves | 19–4 | **Aaron Nola** (3–7) | Cal Quantrill (4–12) | — | 41,293 | 77–57 |
| 135 | August 29 | Braves | 2–1 | **Orion Kerkering** (7–4) | Dylan Lee (2–4) | **Jhoan Durán** (24) | 40,322 | 78–57 |
| 136 | August 30 | Braves | 3–2 (10) | **Matt Strahm** (2–3) | Hunter Stratton (0–1) | — | 43,462 | 79–57 |
| 137 | August 31 | Braves | 1–3 | Tyler Kinley (4–3) | **José Alvarado** (4–2) | Raisel Iglesias (23) | 43,770 | 79–58 |

September: 17–8 (Home: 10–3; Away: 7–5)

| # | Date | Opponent | Score | Win | Loss | Save | Attendance | Record |
|---|---|---|---|---|---|---|---|---|
| 138 | September 1 | @ Brewers | 10–8 | **David Robertson** (2–0) | Abner Uribe (2–2) | **Jhoan Durán** (25) | 42,153 | 80–58 |
| 139 | September 3 | @ Brewers | 3–6 | José Quintana (11–5) | **Aaron Nola** (3–8) | Jared Koenig (1) | 28,528 | 80–59 |
| 140 | September 4 | @ Brewers | 2–0 | **Ranger Suárez** (11–6) | Tobias Myers (1–2) | **Jhoan Durán** (26) | 26,583 | 81–59 |
| 141 | September 5 | @ Marlins | 9–3 | **Cristopher Sánchez** (12–5) | Valente Bellozo (1–4) | — | 15,118 | 82–59 |
| 142 | September 6 | @ Marlins | 4–2 | **Jesús Luzardo** (13–6) | Sandy Alcántara (8–12) | **Jhoan Durán** (27) | 23,877 | 83–59 |
| 143 | September 7 | @ Marlins | 4–5 | Ronny Henríquez (7–1) | **Taijuan Walker** (4–8) | Lake Bachar (3) | 30,223 | 83–60 |
| 144 | September 8 | Mets | 1–0 | **Aaron Nola** (4–8) | Nolan McLean (4–1) | **Jhoan Durán** (28) | 40,388 | 84–60 |
| 145 | September 9 | Mets | 9–3 | **Ranger Suárez** (12–6) | Sean Manaea (1–3) | — | 41,609 | 85–60 |
| 146 | September 10 | Mets | 11–3 | **Cristopher Sánchez** (13–5) | Clay Holmes (11–8) | — | 38,090 | 86–60 |
| 147 | September 11 | Mets | 6–4 | **Jesús Luzardo** (14–6) | Reed Garrett (3–6) | **Jhoan Durán** (29) | 40,098 | 87–60 |
| 148 | September 12 | Royals | 8–2 | **Walker Buehler** (8–7) | Michael Lorenzen (5–11) | — | 41,089 | 88–60 |
| 149 | September 13 | Royals | 8–6 | **Taijuan Walker** (5–8) | Ángel Zerpa (5–2) | **Jhoan Durán** (30) | 43,326 | 89–60 |
| 150 | September 14 | Royals | 3–10 | Noah Cameron (8–7) | **Aaron Nola** (4–9) | — | 42,513 | 89–61 |
| 151 | September 15 | @ Dodgers | 6–5 (10) | **Jhoan Durán** (7–6) | Blake Treinen (1–5) | **David Robertson** (1) | 43,002 | 90–61 |
| 152 | September 16 | @ Dodgers | 9–6 | **Tanner Banks** (6–2) | Blake Treinen (1–6) | **Jhoan Durán** (31) | 44,063 | 91–61 |
| 153 | September 17 | @ Dodgers | 0–5 | Blake Snell (5–4) | **Jesús Luzardo** (14–7) | — | 50,869 | 91–62 |
| 154 | September 19 | @ Diamondbacks | 8–2 | **Walker Buehler** (9–7) | Jalen Beeks (5–2) | — | 36,981 | 92–62 |
| 155 | September 20 | @ Diamondbacks | 3–4 | Zac Gallen (13–14) | **Aaron Nola** (4–10) | John Curtiss (1) | 35,498 | 92–63 |
| 156 | September 21 | @ Diamondbacks | 2–9 | Eduardo Rodríguez (9–8) | **Ranger Suárez** (12–7) | — | 37,105 | 92–64 |
| 157 | September 23 | Marlins | 5–6 (11) | Josh Simpson (4–2) | **Lou Trivino** (3–2) | ― | 38,041 | 92–65 |
| 158 | September 24 | Marlins | 11–1 | **Jesús Luzardo** (15–7) | Ryan Weathers (2–2) | — | 36,816 | 93–65 |
| 159 | September 25 | Marlins | 1–0 | **Walker Buehler** (10-7) | Janson Junk (6-4) | **David Robertson** (2) | 36,265 | 94–65 |
| 160 | September 26 | Twins | 3–1 | **Aaron Nola** (5–10) | Joe Ryan (13–10) | **Jhoan Durán** (32) | 40,073 | 95–65 |
| 161 | September 27 | Twins | 0–5 | Mick Abel (3–5) | **Ranger Suárez** (12–8) | — | 40,506 | 95–66 |
| 162 | September 28 | Twins | 2–1 (10) | **Orion Kerkering** (8–4) | Cody Laweryson (0–1) | — | 42,637 | 96–66 |

== Postseason ==
=== Game log ===
2025 Postseason Game Log: 1–3 (Home: 0–2; Away: 1–1)
NL Division Series: 1–3 (Home: 0–2; Away: 1–1)

| # | Date | Opponent | Score | Win | Loss | Save | Attendance | Record |
|---|---|---|---|---|---|---|---|---|
| 1 | October 4 | Dodgers | 3–5 | Shohei Ohtani (1–0) | David Robertson (0–1) | Roki Sasaki (1) | 45,777 | 0–1 |
| 2 | October 6 | Dodgers | 3–4 | Blake Snell (2–0) | Jesús Luzardo (0–1) | Roki Sasaki (2) | 45,653 | 0–2 |
| 3 | October 8 | @ Dodgers | 8–2 | Ranger Suárez (1–0) | Yoshinobu Yamamoto (1–1) | — | 53,689 | 1–2 |
| 4 | October 9 | @ Dodgers | 1–2 (11) | Alex Vesia (1–0) | Jesús Luzardo (0–2) | — | 50,563 | 1–3 |

=== Postseason rosters ===
Playoff rosters
National League Division Series

- Pitchers: 25 Matt Strahm 27 Aaron Nola 30 David Robertson 31 Walker Buehler 44 Jesús Luzardo 50 Orion Kerkering 54 Tim Mayza 55 Ranger Suárez 58 Tanner Banks 59 Jhoan Durán 61 Cristopher Sánchez 99 Taijuan Walker
- Catchers: 10 J. T. Realmuto 13 Rafael Marchán
- Infielders: 3 Bryce Harper 4 Otto Kemp 5 Bryson Stott 7 Trea Turner 28 Alec Bohm 33 Edmundo Sosa
- Outfielders: 2 Harrison Bader 8 Nick Castellanos 16 Brandon Marsh 17 Max Kepler 37 Weston Wilson
- Designated hitters: 12 Kyle Schwarber

== Farm system ==
| Level | Team | League | Manager |
|---|---|---|---|
| AAA | Lehigh Valley IronPigs | International League | Anthony Contreras |
| AA | Reading Fightin Phils | Eastern League | Al Pedrique |
| High A | Jersey Shore BlueClaws | South Atlantic League | Greg Brodzinski |
| Low-A | Clearwater Threshers | Florida State League | Marty Malloy |
| Rookie | FCL Phillies | Florida Complex League | Shawn Williams |
| Rookie | DSL Phillies Red | Dominican Summer League | Felix Castillo |
| Rookie | DSL Phillies White | Dominican Summer League | Waner Santana |
