= 2024 Philadelphia Phillies season =

Major League Baseball season

2024 Philadelphia Phillies
- National League East champions
- League: National League
- Division: East
- Ballpark: Citizens Bank Park
- City: Philadelphia
- Record: 95–67 (.586)
- Divisional place: 1st
- Owners: John Middleton
- President of baseball operations: Dave Dombrowski
- Managers: Rob Thomson
- Television: NBC Sports Philadelphia; NBC Sports Philadelphia + NBC Philadelphia (Tom McCarthy, Scott Franzke, John Kruk, Ben Davis, Mike Schmidt, Jimmy Rollins, Rubén Amaro Jr., Taryn Hatcher)
- Radio: Phillies Radio Network; WIP SportsRadio 94.1 FM (English) (Scott Franzke, Larry Andersen, Kevin Stocker, Gregg Murphy); WTTM (Spanish) (Danny Martinez, Bill Kulik, Rickie Ricardo)
- Stats: ESPN.com; Baseball Reference

The 2024 Philadelphia Phillies season was the 142nd season in the history of the franchise, and its 21st season at Citizens Bank Park. They entered the season as the runners-up of the National League.

On September 17, the Phillies improved on their 90–72 record from the 2023 season with a win over the Milwaukee Brewers. On September 20, the Phillies clinched a postseason berth for the third consecutive season with a 12–2 blowout win against the New York Mets. On September 23, the Phillies clinched the National League East division title for the first time since 2011 with a 6–2 win against the Chicago Cubs. They were defeated by their division rival New York Mets in the National League Division Series in four games.

== Offseason ==
=== Player transactions ===
==== Players becoming free agents ====
- Aaron Nola – Re-signed with the Phillies on a seven-year, $172 million contract on November 19, 2023.
- Craig Kimbrel – Signed a one-year, $13 million deal with the Baltimore Orioles on December 6, 2023.
- Rhys Hoskins – Signed a two-year, $34 million deal with the Milwaukee Brewers on January 26, 2024.
- Michael Lorenzen – Signed a one-year, $4.5 million deal with the Texas Rangers on March 22, 2024.

==== Free agent acquisitions ====
In a quieter offseason for the club compared to prior years, the Phillies made additions to depth with the acquisitions of pitchers Kolby Allard and Spencer Turnbull, along with utility player Whit Merrifield.

- Kolby Allard – Signed a one-year, $1 million contract on January 23, 2024.
- Spencer Turnbull – Signed a one-year, $2 million contract on February 14, 2024.
- Whit Merrifield – Signed a one-year, $8 million contract on February 19, 2024.

==== Trade acquisitions ====
On March 24, 2024, the Phillies announced that they had traded outfielder Jake Cave to the Colorado Rockies for cash considerations.

On April 6, 2024, the Phillies announced that they had traded relief pitcher Connor Brogdon to the Los Angeles Dodgers for LHP Benony Robles.

== Regular season ==
=== National League East ===
NL East
Team	W	L	Pct.	GB	Home	Road
Philadelphia Phillies	95	67	.586	—	54‍–‍27	41‍–‍40
Atlanta Braves	89	73	.549	6	46‍–‍35	43‍–‍38
New York Mets	89	73	.549	6	46‍–‍35	43‍–‍38
Washington Nationals	71	91	.438	24	38‍–‍43	33‍–‍48
Miami Marlins	62	100	.383	33	30‍–‍51	32‍–‍49

=== National League playoff leaders ===
Division leaders
Team	W	L	Pct.
Los Angeles Dodgers	98	64	.605
Philadelphia Phillies	95	67	.586
Milwaukee Brewers	93	69	.574

Wild Card teams (Top 3 teams qualify for postseason)
Team	W	L	Pct.	GB
San Diego Padres	93	69	.574	+4
Atlanta Braves	89	73	.549	—
New York Mets	89	73	.549	—
Arizona Diamondbacks	89	73	.549	—
St. Louis Cardinals	83	79	.512	6
Chicago Cubs	83	79	.512	6
San Francisco Giants	80	82	.494	9
Cincinnati Reds	77	85	.475	12
Pittsburgh Pirates	76	86	.469	13
Washington Nationals	71	91	.438	18
Miami Marlins	62	100	.383	27
Colorado Rockies	61	101	.377	28

=== Record vs. opponents ===
==== Record vs. National League ====
2024 National League record Source: MLB Standings Grid – 2024
Team	AZ	ATL	CHC	CIN	COL	LAD	MIA	MIL	NYM	PHI	PIT	SD	SF	STL	WSH	AL
Arizona	—	2–5	3–3	5–1	9–4	6–7	4–2	4–3	3–4	4–3	4–2	6–7	7–6	3–3	5–1	24–22
Atlanta	5–2	—	4–2	2–4	3–3	2–5	9–4	2–4	7–6	7–6	3–3	3–4	4–3	2–4	5–8	31–15
Chicago	3–3	2–4	—	5–8	4–2	4–2	4–3	5–8	3–4	2–4	7–6	2–4	3–4	6–7	6–1	27–19
Cincinnati	1–5	4–2	8–5	—	6–1	4–3	5–2	4–9	2–4	4–3	5–8	2–4	2–4	7–6	2–4	21–25
Colorado	4–9	3–3	2–4	1–6	—	3–10	2–5	4–3	2–4	2–4	2–4	8–5	3–10	3–4	2–4	20–26
Los Angeles	7–6	5–2	2–4	3–4	10–3	—	5–1	4–3	4–2	1–5	4–2	5–8	9–4	5–2	4–2	30–16
Miami	2–4	4–9	3–4	2–5	5–2	1–5	—	4–2	6–7	6–7	0–7	2–4	3–3	3–3	2–11	19–27
Milwaukee	3–4	4–2	8–5	9–4	3–4	3–4	2–4	—	5–1	2–4	7–6	2–5	4–2	8–5	2–4	31–15
New York	4–3	6–7	4–3	4–2	4–2	2–4	7–6	1–5	—	6–7	5–2	5–2	2–4	4–2	11–2	24–22
Philadelphia	3–4	6–7	4–2	3–4	4–2	5–1	7–6	4–2	7–6	—	3–4	5–1	5–2	4–2	9–4	26–20
Pittsburgh	2–4	3–3	6–7	8–5	4–2	2–4	7–0	6–7	2–5	4–3	—	0–6	2–4	5–8	4–3	20–26
San Diego	7–6	4–3	4–2	4–2	5–8	8–5	4–2	5–2	2–5	1–5	6–0	—	7–6	3–4	6–0	27–19
San Francisco	6–7	3–4	4–3	4–2	10–3	4–9	3–3	2–4	4–2	2–5	4–2	6–7	—	1–5	4–3	23–23
St. Louis	3–3	4–2	7–6	6–7	4–3	2–5	3–3	5–8	2–4	2–4	8–5	4–3	5–1	—	4–3	24–22
Washington	1–5	8–5	1–6	4–2	4–2	2–4	11–2	4–2	2–11	4–9	3–4	0–6	3–4	3–4	—	21–25

Updated with the results of all games through September 30, 2024.

==== Record vs. American League ====
2024 National League record vs. American League Source: MLB Standings
Team	BAL	BOS	CWS	CLE	DET	HOU	KC	LAA	MIN	NYY	OAK	SEA	TB	TEX	TOR
Arizona	1–2	3–0	2–1	3–0	1–2	1–2	2–1	2–1	1–2	1–2	2–1	1–2	0–3	2–2	2–1
Atlanta	1–2	3–1	1–2	2–1	3–0	3–0	2–1	2–1	3–0	2–1	2–1	1–2	2–1	2–1	2–1
Chicago	3–0	1–2	4–0	0–3	2–1	3–0	2–1	2–1	2–1	1–2	1–2	2–1	1–2	1–2	2–1
Cincinnati	0–3	1–2	3–0	1–3	0–3	3–0	0–3	3–0	2–1	3–0	1–2	0–3	1–2	1–2	2–1
Colorado	1–2	2–1	1–2	2–1	1–2	0–4	2–1	2–1	1–2	1–2	1–2	1–2	1–2	3–0	1–2
Los Angeles	2–1	3–0	3–0	2–1	1–2	1–2	2–1	2–2	2–1	2–1	2–1	3–0	2–1	1–2	2–1
Miami	2–1	0–3	2–1	1–2	2–1	0–3	1–2	0–3	2–1	1–2	1–2	2–1	1–3	1–2	3–0
Milwaukee	2–1	2–1	3–0	3–0	2–1	1–2	1–2	2–1	3–1	1–2	2–1	2–1	2–1	3–0	2–1
New York	2–1	3–0	3–0	0–3	1–2	1–2	2–1	1–2	2–1	4–0	1–2	0–3	0–3	2–1	2–1
Philadelphia	1–2	1–2	3–0	1–2	2–1	2–1	2–1	2–1	1–2	0–3	1–2	1–2	3–0	3–0	3–1
Pittsburgh	2–1	0–3	3–0	1–2	2–2	2–1	1–2	1–2	2–1	2–1	0–3	2–1	1–2	1–2	1–2
San Diego	2–1	2–1	3–0	2–1	2–1	2–1	2–1	0–3	2–1	1–2	3–0	1–3	2–1	2–1	1–2
San Francisco	2–1	1–2	2–1	1–2	2–1	2–1	3–0	1–2	2–1	0–3	2–2	1–2	1–2	2–1	1–2
St. Louis	3–0	2–1	1–2	2–1	1–2	1–2	1–3	2–1	2–1	2–1	2–1	1–2	2–1	2–1	0–3
Washington	2–2	1–2	1–2	1–2	2–1	2–1	0–3	2–1	1–2	2–1	1–2	2–1	1–2	1–2	2–1

Updated with the results of all games through September 30, 2024.

=== Season summary ===
==== March ====
Just five months removed from a heartbreaking National League Championship Series defeat to the Arizona Diamondbacks, the Phillies entered the 2024 season with high expectations and were looking to make some noise in the 2024 season. The Phillies kicked off their 2024 campaign against the Atlanta Braves, the same team they defeated in the National League Division Series two years in a row. The Phillies struggled in the first series of the year, losing two games out of three while being outscored, 12–25.

==== April ====
The Phillies' struggles continued into early April. The team continuously battled back and forth and was struggling to stay around the .500 mark. Going into the middle of April, the team found themselves at an 8–8 record and the offense continued to struggle while the pitching staff started to find its rhythm. The Phillies would end up going on a seven-game win streak led by an offense that looked like it had finally found its spark. The Phillies finished the month off with a 20–11 record and became the first team in MLB to reach 20 wins on the year. By the end of April, the Phillies had the second best record in the National League, behind the Braves, and the fourth best record in all of baseball behind the Braves, Orioles, and Guardians respectfully. The Phillies also were 1st in home runs in the National League and 2nd in total home runs in MLB, behind the Orioles to end the month. Philles starting pitcher Ranger Suárez was named the NL Pitcher of the Month for the month of April.

==== May ====
The Phillies began May with a seven-game winning-streak, including a four-game series sweep of the San Francisco Giants. The streak ended with a series splitting loss to the Toronto Blue Jays on May 7, before taking two of three games against the Miami Marlins. The Phillies went on to take three of four in a home-and-home series against the New York Mets, before winning another six straight games, including sweeps of the Washington Nationals and defending World Series Champion Texas Rangers. On May 22, J. T. Realmuto hit the 14,000th home run in franchise history in an 11–4 victory over the Rangers. As of May 24, the Phillies were 28–6 over their preceding 34 games, tying a franchise mark last set in 1892. Further, the Phillies 36–14 start put them 22 games above-.500, a feat last set by the team at the end of the 2011 season. On Friday, May 31, The Phillies defeated the St. Louis Cardinals in a 4–2 victory to become the first team to 40 wins.

==== June ====
After going 40–18 (.690) the first two months of the season, the Phillies cooled off slightly in June, going 15–11 (.577), scoring 117 runs while allowing 91, and not winning more than three games in a row. The team is comfortably in first with a 55–29 (.655) record and an eight-game lead.

==== July ====
The Phillies slumped badly in July, going only 10–17 (.417) for the month. They scored 107 runs and allowed 126. At the All-Star break, they stand at 62–34 (.646), 8 1/2 games up. They lose five out of the last six games to end the month. The Phillies end July at 65–42 (.607) and are still up 7 1/2 games to close out the month.

==== August ====
The Phillies improved over the previous month, playing just over .500 baseball (15–13, .536). They scored 129 runs while allowing 122. The team mustered a four-game winning streak from August 24–27. The Phillies end August 80–56 (.588) and a six-game lead in the NL East.

==== September ====
The Phillies record a 15–11 (.577) record in the final month of the 2024 season. They scored 128 runs and allowed 124. They began the month with five straight wins. On September 20, the Phillies clinched a playoff berth with a 12–2 rout of the New York Mets, and clinched first place for the division three days later at home with a 6–2 victory over the Chicago Cubs. The Phillies had a chance at 100 wins but went 5–7 in their last 12 games to finish at 95–67 (.586), six games ahead. After the All-Star break, the Phillies played just .500 ball (33–33) for the remainder of the season. Philadelphia finished with the second best record in the NL behind the Los Angeles Dodgers and second best in MLB overall.

== Roster ==
All players who made an appearance for the Phillies during 2024 are included.

2024 Philadelphia Phillies
Roster
Pitchers: 49 Kolby Allard; 46 José Alvarado; 58 Tanner Banks; 75 Connor Brogdon; 58 Seranthony Domínguez; 53 Carlos Estévez; 40 Tyler Gilbert; 23 Jeff Hoffman; 51 Seth Johnson; 50 Orion Kerkering; 60 Max Lazar; 43 Yunior Marte; 63 Michael Mercado; 57 Nick Nelson; 27 Aaron Nola; 56 Luis Ortiz; 48 Tyler Phillips; 51 Ricardo Pinto; 66 José Ruiz; 61 Cristopher Sánchez; 30 Gregory Soto; 25 Matt Strahm; 55 Ranger Suárez; 22 Spencer Turnbull; 99 Taijuan Walker; 45 Zack Wheeler	Catchers: 41 Aramis Garcia; 13 Rafael Marchán; 10 J. T. Realmuto; 21 Garrett Stubbs; Infielders: 28 Alec Bohm; 2 Kody Clemens; 3 Bryce Harper; 2 Josh Harrison; 19 Buddy Kennedy; 33 Edmundo Sosa; 5 Bryson Stott; 7 Trea Turner	Outfielders: 8 Nick Castellanos; 31,35 David Dahl; 9 Austin Hays; 16 Brandon Marsh; 9 Whit Merrifield; 19 Cristian Pache; 18 Johan Rojas; 12,21 Kyle Schwarber; 47 Cal Stevenson; 37 Weston Wilson	Manager: 59 Rob Thomson; Coaches: 95 Mike Calitri (bench); 65 Caleb Cotham (pitching); -- Bobby Dickerson (infield); 38 Paco Figueroa (first base); 97 Brad Flanders (bullpen catcher); 93 Brian Kaplan (assistant pitching); 92 Dustin Lind (assistant hitting); 53 Kevin Long (hitting); 94 Rafael Pena (assistant hitting); 98 Hector Rabago (bullpen catcher); 91 Cesar Ramos (bullpen); 62 Dusty Wathan (third base)

== Player stats ==
= Indicates team leader

= Indicates league leader

=== Batting ===
Note G = Games played; AB = At bats; R = Runs scored; H = Hits; 2B = Doubles; 3B = Triples; HR = Home runs; RBI = Runs batted in; SB = Stolen bases; BB = Walks; AVG = Batting average; SLG = Slugging average

Player	G	AB	R	H	2B	3B	HR	RBI	SB	BB	AVG	SLG
Nick Castellanos	162	606	80	154	30	4	23	86	6	41	.254	.431
Kyle Schwarber	150	573	110	142	22	0	38	104	5	106	.248	.485
Alec Bohm	143	554	62	155	44	2	15	97	5	40	.280	.448
Bryce Harper	145	550	85	157	42	0	30	87	7	76	.285	.525
Bryson Stott	148	506	65	124	19	2	11	57	32	53	.245	.356
Trea Turner	121	505	88	149	25	0	21	62	19	27	.295	.469
Brandon Marsh	135	418	55	104	17	3	16	60	19	50	.249	.419
J. T. Realmuto	99	380	50	101	18	1	14	47	2	27	.266	.429
Johan Rojas	120	338	47	82	12	3	3	32	25	13	.243	.322
Edmundo Sosa	90	249	39	64	12	4	7	31	7	13	.257	.422
Garrett Stubbs	54	164	18	34	4	1	1	11	5	17	.207	.262
Whit Merrifield	53	156	21	31	4	1	3	11	11	15	.199	.295
Kody Clemens	43	114	17	25	9	1	5	18	0	5	.219	.447
Cristian Pache	50	104	9	21	5	1	0	9	0	13	.202	.269
Weston Wilson	40	88	13	25	7	1	3	10	3	8	.284	.489
Austin Hayes	22	78	8	20	5	0	2	6	2	0	.256	.397
David Dahl	19	58	6	12	2	0	3	8	0	3	.207	.397
Rafael Marchán	17	51	8	15	4	0	3	6	0	3	.294	.549
Cal Stevenson	18	24	2	6	3	0	0	6	0	3	.250	.375
Buddy Kennedy	8	11	1	2	1	0	0	2	0	2	.182	.273
Aramis Garcia	3	7	0	0	0	0	0	0	0	0	.000	.000
Team totals	162	5534	784	1423	285	24	198	750	148	515	.257	.425

Source:Baseball Reference

=== Pitching ===
Note: W = Wins; L = Losses; ERA = Earned run average; G = Games pitched; GS = Games started; SV = Saves; IP = Innings pitched; H = Hits allowed; R = Runs allowed; ER = Earned runs allowed; BB = Walks allowed; SO = Strikeouts

Player	W	L	ERA	G	GS	SV	IP	H	R	ER	BB	SO
Zach Wheeler	16	7	2.57	32	32	0	200.0	139	62	57	52	224
Aaron Nola	14	8	3.57	33	33	0	199.1	189	84	79	50	197
Cristopher Sánchez	11	9	3.32	31	31	0	181.2	182	76	67	44	153
Ranger Suárez	12	8	3.46	27	27	0	150.2	140	63	58	41	145
Taijuan Walker	3	7	7.10	19	15	0	83.2	107	68	66	37	58
Jeff Hoffman	3	3	2.17	68	0	10	66.1	48	20	16	16	89
Orion Kerkering	5	3	2.29	64	2	0	63.0	51	20	16	17	74
Matt Strahm	6	2	1.87	66	0	3	62.2	36	14	13	11	79
José Alvarado	2	5	4.09	66	0	13	61.2	49	30	28	28	63
Spencer Turnbull	3	0	2.65	17	7	0	54.1	37	17	16	20	58
José Ruiz	5	1	3.71	52	0	1	51.0	51	23	21	17	52
Tyler Phillips	4	1	6.87	8	7	0	36.2	45	28	28	7	28
Seranthony Domínguez	3	2	4.75	38	0	1	36.0	32	22	19	12	40
Gregory Soto	2	4	4.08	43	0	2	35.1	36	19	16	20	44
Kolby Allard	2	0	5.00	7	4	0	27.0	34	15	15	8	23
Yunior Marte	0	0	6.92	23	0	0	26.0	34	22	20	15	23
Tanner Banks	0	1	3.70	22	1	0	24.1	22	11	10	10	23
Carlos Estévez	3	2	2.57	20	0	6	21.0	18	8	6	7	18
Max Lazar	0	0	4.61	11	0	0	13.2	13	7	7	2	9
Michael Mercado	1	2	11.08	5	2	0	13.0	16	16	16	9	10
Ricardo Pinto	0	0	10.97	6	0	1	10.2	19	14	13	5	8
Tyler Gilbert	0	0	3.24	6	0	0	8.1	10	3	3	2	4
Nick Nelson	0	0	5.06	4	0	0	5.1	8	3	3	2	8
Garrett Stubbs	0	0	15.75	4	0	0	4.0	6	7	7	2	0
Seth Johnson	0	1	34.71	1	1	0	2.1	8	9	9	3	0
Connor Brogdon	0	1	27.00	3	0	0	2.0	3	7	6	6	3
Weston Wilson	0	0	0.00	1	0	0	1.0	1	0	0	0	0
Kody Clemens	0	0	9.00	1	0	0	1.0	2	1	1	1	0
Luis Ortiz	0	0	27.00	1	0	0	0.2	3	2	2	0	0
Team totals	95	67	3.85	162	162	37	1442.2	1339	671	617	444	1433

Source:Baseball Reference

== Game log ==
=== Regular season ===
Legend
	Phillies win
	Phillies loss
	Postponement
	Clinched playoff spot
	Clinched division
**Bold**	Phillies team member

2024 Game Log: 95–67 (Home: 54–27; Away: 41–40)
March/April: 20–11 (Home: 10–6; Away: 10–5)

#	Date	Opponent	Score	Win	Loss	Save	Attendance	Record
–	March 28	Braves	Postponed (rain); Makeup: March 29					
1	March 29	Braves	3–9	Pierce Johnson (1–0)	**José Alvarado** (0–1)	—	44,452	0–1
2	March 30	Braves	4–12	Jesse Chavez (1–0)	**Aaron Nola** (0–1)	—	44,468	0–2
3	March 31	Braves	5–4	**Matt Strahm** (1–0)	Aaron Bummer (0–1)	**José Alvarado** (1)	42,515	1–2
4	April 1	Reds	3–6 (10)	Alexis Díaz (1–1)	**Connor Brogdon** (0–1)	—	33,754	1–3
5	April 2	Reds	9–4	**Spencer Turnbull** (1–0)	Graham Ashcraft (0–1)	**Ricardo Pinto** (1)	28,119	2–3
6	April 3	Reds	1–4	Frankie Montas (2–0)	**Zack Wheeler** (0–1)	Alexis Díaz (1)	28,077	2–4
7	April 5	@ Nationals	4–0	**Aaron Nola** (1–1)	Patrick Corbin (0–1)	—	21,374	3–4
8	April 6	@ Nationals	5–2	**Ranger Suárez** (1–0)	Jake Irvin (0–1)	**José Alvarado** (2)	29,718	4–4
9	April 7	@ Nationals	2–3	MacKenzie Gore (1–0)	**Cristopher Sánchez** (0–1)	Kyle Finnegan (3)	24,765	4–5
10	April 8	@ Cardinals	5–3 (10)	**Jeff Hoffman** (1–0)	Ryan Helsley (1–1)	**Gregory Soto** (1)	32,621	5–5
11	April 9	@ Cardinals	0–3	Sonny Gray (1–0)	**Zack Wheeler** (0–2)	Ryan Helsley (4)	31,972	5–6
12	April 10	@ Cardinals	4–3	**Aaron Nola** (2–1)	Andre Pallante (0–1)	**Jeff Hoffman** (1)	33,104	6–6
13	April 11	Pirates	5–1	**Ranger Suárez** (2–0)	Jared Jones (1–2)	—	33,362	7–6
14	April 12	Pirates	2–5	Bailey Falter (1–0)	**Cristopher Sánchez** (0–2)	David Bednar (2)	35,578	7–7
15	April 13	Pirates	4–3	**Jeff Hoffman** (2–0)	José Hernández (1–1)	—	40,519	8–7
16	April 14	Pirates	2–9	Mitch Keller (2–1)	**Zack Wheeler** (0–3)	—	44,568	8–8
17	April 15	Rockies	2–1 (10)	**Seranthony Domínguez** (1–0)	Jake Bird (0–1)	—	35,496	9–8
18	April 16	Rockies	5–0	**Ranger Suárez** (3–0)	Austin Gomber (0–1)	—	35,010	10–8
19	April 17	Rockies	7–6	**Cristopher Sánchez** (1–2)	Ryan Feltner (1–2)	**José Alvarado** (3)	35,706	11–8
20	April 19	White Sox	7–0	**Spencer Turnbull** (2–0)	Garrett Crochet (1–3)	—	39,069	12–8
21	April 20	White Sox	9–5	**Zack Wheeler** (1–3)	Michael Soroka (0–3)	**José Alvarado** (4)	44,546	13–8
22	April 21	White Sox	8–2	**Aaron Nola** (3–1)	Nick Nastrini (0–2)	—	43,614	14–8
23	April 22	@ Reds	7–0	**Ranger Suárez** (4–0)	Hunter Greene (0–2)	—	11,263	15–8
24	April 23	@ Reds	1–8	Fernando Cruz (1–1)	**Cristopher Sánchez** (1–3)	—	13,653	15–9
25	April 24	@ Reds	4–7	Justin Wilson (1–0)	**Seranthony Domínguez** (1–1)	Alexis Díaz (5)	14,145	15–10
26	April 25	@ Reds	5–0	**Zack Wheeler** (2–3)	Nick Martinez (0–1)	—	17,557	16–10
27	April 26	@ Padres	9–3	**Aaron Nola** (4–1)	Joe Musgrove (3–3)	—	40,763	17–10
28	April 27	@ Padres	5–1	**Ranger Suárez** (5–0)	Dylan Cease (3–2)	—	43,018	18–10
29	April 28	@ Padres	8–6	**Taijuan Walker** (1–0)	Michael King (2–3)	**José Alvarado** (5)	42,037	19–10
30	April 29	@ Angels	5–6	Adam Cimber (2–0)	**Seranthony Domínguez** (1–2)	Carlos Estévez (5)	25,449	19–11
31	April 30	@ Angels	7–5	**José Alvarado** (1–1)	Carlos Estévez (0–1)	**Jeff Hoffman** (2)	23,949	20–11

May: 20–7 (Home: 13–2; Away: 7–5)

#	Date	Opponent	Score	Win	Loss	Save	Attendance	Record
32	May 1	@ Angels	2–1	**Zack Wheeler** (3–3)	Patrick Sandoval (1–5)	**Gregory Soto** (2)	20,156	21–11
33	May 3	Giants	4–3	**Matt Strahm** (2–0)	Jordan Hicks (2–1)	**José Alvarado** (6)	40,888	22–11
34	May 4	Giants	14–3	**Ranger Suárez** (6–0)	Keaton Winn (3–4)	—	42,610	23–11
35	May 5	Giants	5–4	**Taijuan Walker** (2–0)	Logan Webb (3–3)	**José Alvarado** (7)	41,058	24–11
36	May 6	Giants	6–1	**Zack Wheeler** (4–3)	Mason Black (0–1)	—	33,408	25–11
37	May 7	Blue Jays	10–1	**Cristopher Sánchez** (2–3)	José Berríos (4–3)	—	39,492	26–11
38	May 8	Blue Jays	3–5	Chris Bassitt (3–5)	**Aaron Nola** (4–2)	Jordan Romano (5)	34,681	26–12
39	May 10	@ Marlins	8–2	**Ranger Suárez** (7–0)	Trevor Rogers (0–6)	—	15,119	27–12
40	May 11	@ Marlins	8–3	**Taijuan Walker** (3–0)	Jesús Luzardo (0–3)	—	13,210	28–12
41	May 12	@ Marlins	6–7 (10)	Anthony Bender (1–2)	**Gregory Soto** (0–1)	—	13,001	28–13
42	May 13	@ Mets	5–4 (10)	**Orion Kerkering** (1–0)	Sean Reid-Foley (1–1)	**José Alvarado** (8)	28,086	29–13
43	May 14	@ Mets	4–0	**Aaron Nola** (5–2)	José Buttó (1–3)	—	30,047	30–13
44	May 15	Mets	10–5	**Ranger Suárez** (8–0)	Joey Lucchesi (0–1)	—	37,219	31–13
45	May 16	Mets	5–6 (11)	Jorge López (1–0)	**José Alvarado** (1–2)	Jake Diekman (1)	38,267	31–14
46	May 17	Nationals	4–2	**Zack Wheeler** (5–3)	Jake Irvin (2–4)	**Jeff Hoffman** (3)	44,507	32–14
47	May 18	Nationals	4–3 (10)	**Gregory Soto** (1–1)	Kyle Finnegan (1–3)	–	43,112	33–14
48	May 19	Nationals	11–5	**Aaron Nola** (6–2)	Jacob Barnes (2–1)	—	44,713	34–14
49	May 21	Rangers	5–2	**Ranger Suárez** (9–0)	Jon Gray (2–2)	**José Alvarado** (9)	41,083	35–14
50	May 22	Rangers	11–4	**Matt Strahm** (3–0)	Dane Dunning (3–3)	—	39,595	36–14
51	May 23	Rangers	5–2	**Zack Wheeler** (6–3)	Andrew Heaney (0–6)	**Jeff Hoffman** (4)	42,377	37–14
52	May 24	@ Rockies	2–3 (11)	Tyler Kinley (3–1)	**Gregory Soto** (1–2)	—	35,007	37–15
53	May 25	@ Rockies	8–4	**José Ruiz** (1–0)	Justin Lawrence (1–3)	—	37,535	38–15
54	May 26	@ Rockies	2–5	Cal Quantrill (4–3)	**Ranger Suárez** (9–1)	Tyler Kinley (2)	47,442	38–16
55	May 27	@ Giants	4–8	Randy Rodríguez (1–0)	**Taijuan Walker** (3–1)	—	40,598	38–17
56	May 28	@ Giants	0–1 (10)	Sean Hjelle (2–1)	**Matt Strahm** (3–1)	—	34,655	38–18
57	May 29	@ Giants	6–1	**Cristopher Sánchez** (3–3)	Kyle Harrison (4–2)	—	31,763	39–18
58	May 31	Cardinals	4–2	**Aaron Nola** (7–2)	Miles Mikolas (3–6)	**Jeff Hoffman** (5)	44,742	40–18

June: 15–11 (Home: 10–6; Away: 5–5)

#	Date	Opponent	Score	Win	Loss	Save	Attendance	Record
59	June 1	Cardinals	6–1	**Spencer Turnbull** (3–0)	Sonny Gray (7–3)	—	44,668	41–18
60	June 2	Cardinals	4–5 (10)	John King (2–1)	**Gregory Soto** (1–3)	Ryan Helsley (19)	41,190	41–19
61	June 3	Brewers	3–1	**Zack Wheeler** (7–3)	Bryse Wilson (3–2)	**José Alvarado** (10)	43,553	42–19
62	June 4	Brewers	2–1 (10)	**Seranthony Domínguez** (2–2)	Joel Payamps (1–2)	—	40,632	43–19
63	June 5	Brewers	2–0	**Aaron Nola** (8–2)	Aaron Ashby (0–2)	**José Alvarado** (11)	38,910	44–19
64	June 8*	@ Mets	7–2	**Ranger Suárez** (10–1)	Sean Manaea (3–3)	—	53,882	45–19
65	June 9*	Mets	5–6	Reed Garrett (6–2)	**José Alvarado** (1–3)	Drew Smith (2)	55,074	45–20
66	June 11	@ Red Sox	4–1	**Zack Wheeler** (8–3)	Kutter Crawford (2–6)	**José Alvarado** (12)	35,004	46–20
67	June 12	@ Red Sox	6–8	Cam Booser (1–2)	**José Ruiz** (1–1)	Kenley Jansen (10)	33,236	46–21
68	June 13	@ Red Sox	3–9	Tanner Houck (7–5)	**Aaron Nola** (8–3)	Brad Keller (1)	34,007	46–22
69	June 14	@ Orioles	5–3 (11)	**Orion Kerkering** (2–0)	Jacob Webb (1–4)	**Seranthony Domínguez** (1)	43,987	47–22
70	June 15	@ Orioles	2–6	Grayson Rodriguez (8–2)	**Taijuan Walker** (3–2)	—	44,555	47–23
71	June 16	@ Orioles	3–8	Corbin Burnes (8–2)	**Zack Wheeler** (8–4)	Yennier Canó (3)	44,525	47–24
72	June 17	Padres	9–2	**Cristopher Sánchez** (4–3)	Randy Vásquez (1–4)	—	43,134	48–24
73	June 18	Padres	4–3	**Jeff Hoffman** (3–0)	Robert Suárez (4–1)	—	43,021	49–24
74	June 19	Padres	2–5	Matt Waldron (5–6)	**Orion Kerkering** (2–1)	Robert Suárez (18)	44,445	49–25
75	June 21	Diamondbacks	4–5	Jordan Montgomery (6–4)	**Taijuan Walker** (3–3)	Paul Sewald (9)	44,436	49–26
76	June 22	Diamondbacks	12–1	**Zack Wheeler** (9–4)	Tommy Henry (2–3)	—	44,288	50–26
77	June 23	Diamondbacks	4–1	**Cristopher Sánchez** (5–3)	Slade Cecconi (2–6)	—	44,079	51–26
78	June 24	@ Tigers	8–1	**Aaron Nola** (9–3)	Casey Mize (1–6)	—	20,108	52–26
79	June 25	@ Tigers	1–4	Tarik Skubal (9–3)	**Ranger Suárez** (10–2)	—	24,345	52–27
80	June 26	@ Tigers	6–2	**José Ruiz** (2–1)	Keider Montero (0–2)	—	22,530	53–27
81	June 27	Marlins	4–7	Anthony Bender (3–2)	**Jeff Hoffman** (3–1)	Tanner Scott (11)	43,507	53–28
82	June 28	Marlins	2–0	**Cristopher Sánchez** (6–3)	Kyle Tyler (0–1)	—	44,252	54–28
83	June 29	Marlins	2–3	Andrew Nardi (1–0)	**Aaron Nola** (9–4)	Tanner Scott (12)	44,117	54–29
84	June 30	Marlins	7–6	**Seranthony Domínguez** (3–2)	Andrew Nardi (1–1)	**Jeff Hoffman** (6)	43,222	55–29
*June 8 and 9 games played at London Stadium in London, England

July: 10–14 (Home: 5–7; Away: 5–7)

#	Date	Opponent	Score	Win	Loss	Save	Attendance	Record
85	July 2	@ Cubs	6–4	**Michael Mercado** (1–0)	Hayden Wesneski (2–5)	**Jeff Hoffman** (7)	38,670	56–29
86	July 3	@ Cubs	5–3	**Matt Strahm** (4–1)	Tyson Miller (2–1)	**José Alvarado** (13)	36,653	57–29
87	July 4	@ Cubs	2–10	Jameson Taillon (5–4)	**Cristopher Sánchez** (6–4)	—	40,143	57–30
88	July 5	@ Braves	8–6	**Aaron Nola** (10–4)	Max Fried (7–4)	**Jeff Hoffman** (8)	40,942	58–30
89	July 6	@ Braves	1–5	Spencer Schwellenbach (2–4)	**Ranger Suárez** (10–3)	—	41,006	58–31
90	July 7	@ Braves	0–6	Reynaldo López (7–2)	**Michael Mercado** (1–1)	—	36,808	58–32
91	July 9	Dodgers	10–1	**Zack Wheeler** (10–4)	Bobby Miller (1–2)	—	43,065	59–32
92	July 10	Dodgers	4–3	**Cristopher Sánchez** (7–4)	Gavin Stone (9–3)	**Jeff Hoffman** (9)	42,912	60–32
93	July 11	Dodgers	5–1	**Aaron Nola** (11–4)	Anthony Banda (1–2)	—	44,020	61–32
94	July 12	Athletics	2–6	Osvaldo Bido (1–1)	**Ranger Suárez** (10–4)	—	42,570	61–33
95	July 13	Athletics	11–5	**Tyler Phillips** (1–0)	Mitch Spence (5–6)	—	44,231	62–33
96	July 14	Athletics	3–18	Joey Estes (4–4)	**Michael Mercado** (1–2)	—	43,025	62–34
–	July 16	**2024 Major League Baseball All-Star Game at Globe Life Field in Arlington, Texas**						
97	July 19	@ Pirates	7–8	Carmen Mlodzinski (2–3)	**José Alvarado** (1–4)	—	39,530	62–35
98	July 20	@ Pirates	1–4	Luis Ortiz (5–2)	**Cristopher Sánchez** (7–5)	—	39,114	62–36
99	July 21	@ Pirates	6–0	**Tyler Phillips** (2–0)	Marco Gonzales (1–1)	—	38,291	63–36
100	July 22	@ Twins	2–7	Bailey Ober (9–5)	**Ranger Suárez** (10–5)	Cole Sands (3)	29,904	63–37
101	July 23	@ Twins	3–0	**Gregory Soto** (2–3)	Jhoan Durán (5–5)	**Matt Strahm** (1)	31,272	64–37
102	July 24	@ Twins	4–5	Jhoan Durán (6–5)	**Gregory Soto** (2–4)	—	33,813	64–38
103	July 26	Guardians	1–3	Ben Lively (9–6)	**Cristopher Sánchez** (7–6)	Emmanuel Clase (32)	44,448	64–39
104	July 27	Guardians	8–0	**Tyler Phillips** (3–0)	Carlos Carrasco (3–9)	—	44,356	65–39
105	July 28	Guardians	3–4	Tim Herrin (4–0)	**José Alvarado** (1–5)	Emmanuel Clase (33)	43,845	65–40
106	July 29	Yankees	4–14	Luis Gil (11–5)	**Zack Wheeler** (10–5)	—	44,289	65–41
107	July 30	Yankees	6–7 (12)	Michael Tonkin (4–4)	**Orion Kerkering** (2–2)	—	44,502	65–42
108	July 31	Yankees	5–6	Nestor Cortés Jr. (5–9)	**Cristopher Sánchez** (7–7)	Clay Holmes (22)	44,543	65–43

August: 15–13 (Home: 8–4; Away: 7–9)

#	Date	Opponent	Score	Win	Loss	Save	Attendance	Record
109	August 2	@ Mariners	2–10	Bryan Woo (5–1)	**Tyler Phillips** (3–1)	—	40,739	65–44
110	August 3	@ Mariners	5–6 (10)	Collin Snider (2–1)	**Carlos Estévez** (1–4)	—	36,629	65–45
111	August 4	@ Mariners	6–0	**Zack Wheeler** (11–5)	Logan Gilbert (6–8)	—	39,588	66–45
112	August 5	@ Dodgers	3–5	Tyler Glasnow (9–6)	**Aaron Nola** (11–5)	Daniel Hudson (8)	48,178	66–46
113	August 6	@ Dodgers	6–2	**Cristopher Sánchez** (8–7)	Clayton Kershaw (0–2)	—	47,150	67–46
114	August 7	@ Dodgers	9–4	**Tyler Phillips** (4–1)	Alex Vesia (2–4)	—	45,003	68–46
115	August 8	@ Diamondbacks	6–4	**Kolby Allard** (1–0)	Jordan Montgomery (7–6)	**Carlos Estévez** (21)	25,239	69–46
116	August 9	@ Diamondbacks	2–3	Justin Martínez (5–2)	**Jeff Hoffman** (3–2)	—	37,952	69–47
117	August 10	@ Diamondbacks	1–11	Kevin Ginkel (7–2)	**Aaron Nola** (11–6)	—	46,183	69–48
118	August 11	@ Diamondbacks	5–12	Merrill Kelly (3–0)	**Cristopher Sánchez** (8–8)	—	29,071	69–49
119	August 13	Marlins	0–5	Valente Bellozo (2–1)	**Taijuan Walker** (3–4)	—	42,846	69–50
120	August 14	Marlins	9–5	**José Ruiz** (3–1)	Edward Cabrera (2–4)	—	42,577	70–50
121	August 15	Nationals	13–3	**Zack Wheeler** (12–5)	Mitchell Parker (6–7)	—	43,722	71–50
122	August 16	Nationals	3–2	**Carlos Estévez** (2–4)	Kyle Finnegan (3–6)	—	41,067	72–50
123	August 17	Nationals	5–1	**Cristopher Sánchez** (9–8)	MacKenzie Gore (7–11)	—	43,356	73–50
124	August 18	Nationals	4–6	Jacob Barnes (7–2)	**Matt Strahm** (4–2)	Kyle Finnegan (31)	40,677	73–51
125	August 20	@ Braves	1–3	Grant Holmes (2–0)	**Zack Wheeler** (12–6)	Raisel Iglesias (27)	34,245	73–52
126	August 21	@ Braves	3–2	**Matt Strahm** (5–2)	Joe Jiménez (1–5)	**Carlos Estévez** (22)	33,231	74–52
127	August 22	@ Braves	2–3	Spencer Schwellenbach (5–6)	**Cristopher Sánchez** (9–9)	Raisel Iglesias (28)	34,704	74–53
128	August 23	@ Royals	4–7	Michael Wacha (11–6)	**Taijuan Walker** (3–5)	Lucas Erceg (7)	25,491	74–54
129	August 24	@ Royals	11–2	**Ranger Suárez** (11–5)	Brady Singer (9–9)	—	27,002	75–54
130	August 25	@ Royals	11–3	**Kolby Allard** (2–0)	Seth Lugo (14–8)	—	18,193	76–54
131	August 26	Astros	3–2 (10)	**Matt Strahm** (6–2)	Josh Hader (6–7)	—	39,627	77–54
132	August 27	Astros	5–0	**Aaron Nola** (12–6)	Justin Verlander (3–4)	—	39,373	78–54
133	August 28	Astros	0–10	Spencer Arrighetti (7–11)	**Taijuan Walker** (3–6)	—	37,778	78–55
134	August 29	Braves	5–4	**Orion Kerkering** (3–2)	Grant Holmes (2–1)	**Jeff Hoffman** (10)	40,451	79–55
135	August 30	Braves	2–7	Reynaldo López (8–4)	**Ranger Suárez** (11–6)	—	40,193	79–56
136	August 31	Braves	3–0	**Zack Wheeler** (13–6)	Max Fried (8–8)	**Carlos Estévez** (23)	42,730	80–56

September: 15–11 (Home: 8–2; Away: 7–9)

#	Date	Opponent	Score	Win	Loss	Save	Attendance	Record
137	September 1	Braves	3–2 (11)	**Carlos Estévez** (3–4)	Aaron Bummer (4–3)	—	43,249	81–56
138	September 3	@ Blue Jays	10–9	**Orion Kerkering** (4–2)	Chad Green (4–5)	**Matt Strahm** (2)	23,796	82–56
139	September 4	@ Blue Jays	4–2	**Cristopher Sánchez** (10–9)	Bowden Francis (8–4)	**Carlos Estévez** (24)	23,768	83–56
140	September 5	@ Marlins	5–2	**Ranger Suárez** (12–6)	Adam Oller (1–2)	**Matt Strahm** (3)	9,355	84–56
141	September 6	@ Marlins	16–2	**Zack Wheeler** (14–6)	Austin Kitchen (0–1)	—	15,963	85–56
142	September 7	@ Marlins	5–9	John McMillon (2–1)	**Aaron Nola** (12–7)	—	23,189	85–57
143	September 8	@ Marlins	1–10	Edward Cabrera (4–6)	**Seth Johnson** (0–1)	—	15,202	85–58
144	September 9	Rays	2–1	**Carlos Estévez** (4–4)	Garrett Cleavinger (7–4)	—	39,511	86–58
145	September 10	Rays	9–4	**José Alvarado** (2–5)	Richard Lovelady (3–6)	—	40,088	87–58
146	September 11	Rays	3–2	**Zack Wheeler** (15–6)	Drew Rasmussen (0–1)	**Carlos Estévez** (25)	40,715	88–58
147	September 13	Mets	3–11	José Quintana (9–9)	**Aaron Nola** (12–8)	—	44,607	88–59
148	September 14	Mets	6–4	**Orion Kerkering** (5–2)	Danny Young (4–1)	**Carlos Estévez** (26)	44,563	89–59
149	September 15	Mets	2–1	**José Ruiz** (4–1)	Edwin Díaz (5–4)	—	44,786	90–59
150	September 16	@ Brewers	2–6	Aaron Civale (7–8)	**Ranger Suárez** (12–7)	Colin Rea (1)	28,713	90–60
151	September 17	@ Brewers	5–1	**Zack Wheeler** (16–6)	Frankie Montas (7–11)	—	30,059	91–60
152	September 18	@ Brewers	1–2	Devin Williams (1–0)	**Carlos Estévez** (4–5)	—	30,048	91–61
153	September 19	@ Mets	6–10	Luis Severino (11–6)	**Taijuan Walker** (3–7)	—	35,982	91–62
154	September 20	@ Mets	12–2	**Cristopher Sánchez** (11–9)	David Peterson (9–3)	—	41,474	92–62
155	September 21	@ Mets	3–6	Sean Manaea (12–5)	**Orion Kerkering** (5–3)	Edwin Díaz (19)	44,152	92–63
156	September 22	@ Mets	1–2	Phil Maton (3–3)	**Zack Wheeler** (16–7)	Edwin Díaz (20)	43,139	92–64
157	September 23	Cubs	6–2	**Aaron Nola** (13–8)	Caleb Kilian (0–1)	—	42,386	93–64
158	September 24	Cubs	4–10	Drew Smyly (4–8)	**Tanner Banks** (2–3)	—	42,033	93–65
159	September 25	Cubs	9–6	**José Ruiz** (5–1)	Javier Assad (7–6)	—	42,438	94–65
160	September 27	@ Nationals	1–9	Trevor Williams (6–1)	**Ranger Suárez** (12–8)	—	31,796	94–66
161	September 28	@ Nationals	3–6	José A. Ferrer (1–0)	**Jeff Hoffman** (3–3)	—	38,135	94–67
162	September 29	@ Nationals	6–3	**Aaron Nola** (14–8)	Jake Irvin (10–14)	**José Ruiz** (1)	26,729	95–67

== Postseason ==
=== Game log ===
2024 Postseason Game Log: 1–3 (Home: 1–1; Away: 0–2)
NL Division Series: 1–3 (Home: 1–1; Away: 0–2)

#	Date	Opponent	Score	Win	Loss	Save	Attendance	Record
1	October 5	Mets	2–6	Reed Garrett (1–0)	Jeff Hoffman (0–1)	—	45,751	0–1
2	October 6	Mets	7–6	Jeff Hoffman (1–1)	Tylor Megill (0–1)	—	45,679	1–1
3	October 8	@ Mets	2–7	Sean Manaea (1–0)	Aaron Nola (0–1)	—	44,093	1–2
4	October 9	@ Mets	1–4	David Peterson (1–0)	Jeff Hoffman (1–2)	Edwin Díaz (1)	44,103	1–3

=== Postseason rosters ===
Playoff rosters
National League Division Series

- Pitchers: 23 Jeff Hoffman 25 Matt Strahm 27 Aaron Nola 45 Zack Wheeler 46 José Alvarado 49 Kolby Allard 50 Orion Kerkering 53 Carlos Estévez 55 Ranger Suárez 58 Tanner Banks 61 Cristopher Sánchez 66 José Ruiz
- Catchers: 10 J. T. Realmuto 21 Garrett Stubbs
- Infielders: 2 Kody Clemens 3 Bryce Harper 5 Bryson Stott 7 Trea Turner 28 Alec Bohm 33 Edmundo Sosa 37 Weston Wilson
- Outfielders: 8 Nick Castellanos 9 Austin Hays 16 Brandon Marsh 18 Johan Rojas
- Designated hitters: 12 Kyle Schwarber

== Farm system ==
Level	Team	League	Manager
AAA	Lehigh Valley IronPigs	International League	Anthony Contreras
AA	Reading Fightin Phils	Eastern League	Al Pedrique
High A	Jersey Shore BlueClaws	South Atlantic League	Greg Brodzinski
Low-A	Clearwater Threshers	Florida State League	Marty Malloy
Rookie	FCL Phillies	Florida Complex League	Shawn Williams
Rookie	DSL Phillies Red	Dominican Summer League	Nerluis Martinez
Rookie	DSL Phillies White	Dominican Summer League	Luis Avila
