= Mick Abel =

American baseball player (born 2001)

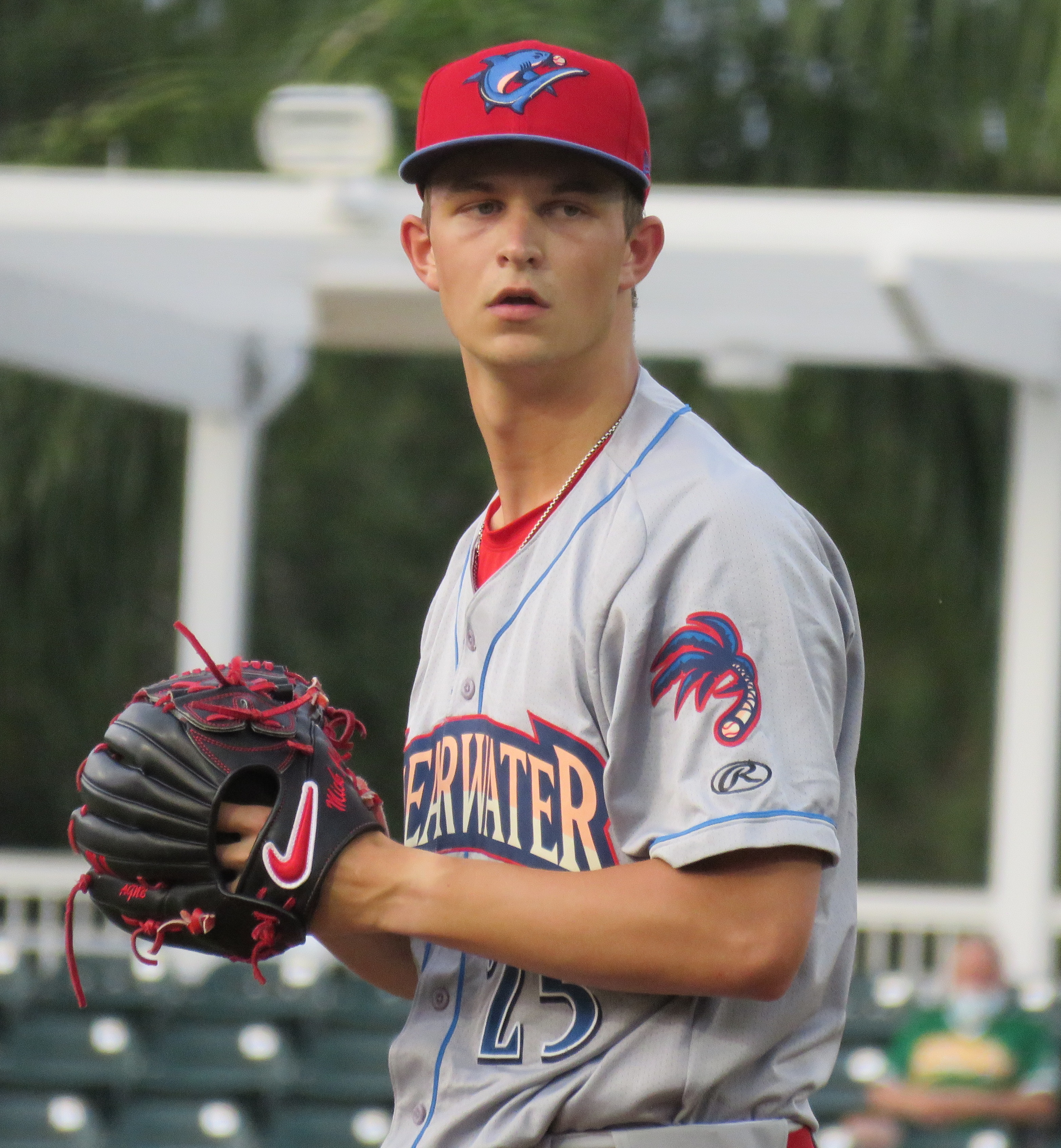
- Abel with the Clearwater Threshers in 2021

Minnesota Twins – No. 20
- Pitcher
- Born: August 18, 2001 (age 25); Portland, Oregon, U.S.
- Bats: Right Throws: Right

MLB debut
- May 18, 2025, for the Philadelphia Phillies

MLB statistics (through 2026 season)
- Win–loss record: 4–6
- Earned run average: 5.46
- Strikeouts: 62
- Stats at Baseball Reference

Teams
- Philadelphia Phillies (2025); Minnesota Twins (2025–present)
Medals
Men's baseball
Representing United States
U-18 Baseball World Cup
Silver medal – second place	2019 Gijang	Team

McLean Stine "Mick" Abel (born August 18, 2001) is an American professional baseball pitcher for the Minnesota Twins of Major League Baseball (MLB). He has previously played in MLB for the Philadelphia Phillies. Abel was selected by the Phillies in the first round with the 15th overall pick of the 2020 MLB draft and made his MLB debut in 2025.

== Amateur career ==
Abel grew up in Cedar Mill, Oregon, and helped lead the Cedar Mill Little League team win a state title as a youth. He graduated from Jesuit High School, where he was both a first baseman and a starting pitcher on the baseball team. Abel's sophomore season was cut short by an injury to his non-throwing shoulder that required surgery. As a junior Abel posted a 10–0 record with a 1.26 ERA and 111 strikeouts in 72 1/3 innings pitched while also batting .294 with 12 runs scored and 14 RBIs as he helped lead the Crusaders to a state championship and was named the Oregon Gatorade Player of the Year and a Junior All-American by MaxPreps. In 2019, he was selected for U-18 United States national baseball team. Entering his 2020 senior season Abel was named a preseason All-American by MaxPreps and Baseball America and was considered to be a top prospect for the upcoming draft. He was also ranked the fourth best collegiate prospect in the nation and committed to play at Oregon State University after his freshman year of high school. Despite the 2020 season being cancelled due to COVID-19, Abel was once again named Oregon Gatorade Player of the Year.

== Professional career ==
=== Philadelphia Phillies ===
Abel was selected by the Philadelphia Phillies with the 15th overall selection in the 2020 Major League Baseball draft. Abel signed with the Phillies for a $4.075 million bonus. He became the highest-selected high school pitcher for the Phillies since 2001, when they selected Gavin Floyd fourth overall. He did not play in a game in 2020 due to the cancellation of the minor league season because of the COVID-19 pandemic.

Abel made his professional debut in 2021 with the Low-A Clearwater Threshers. Over 14 starts, he went 1–3 with a 4.43 ERA and 27 walks and 66 strikeouts over 44 2/3 innings. He missed time during the season due to a shoulder injury. Abel was assigned to the Jersey Shore BlueClaws of the High-A South Atlantic League at the beginning of the 2022 season. He went 7–8 with a 4.01 ERA and 103 strikeouts over 18 starts with Jersey Shore before being promoted to the Reading Fightin Phils of the Double-A Eastern League. In his Double-A debut on August 20, Abel allowed two runs and struck out eight batters in six innings to earn the win over the Portland Sea Dogs.

Abel spent the 2024 campaign with the Triple–A Lehigh Valley IronPigs, making 24 starts and struggling to a 3–12 record (leading the league in losses) and 6.46 ERA with 78 walks (2nd in the league; 6.5 per 9 innings) and 117 strikeouts (9.7 per 9 innings) across 108 2/3 innings pitched. On November 19, 2024, the Phillies added Abel to their 40-man roster to protect him from the Rule 5 draft.

Abel was optioned to Triple-A Lehigh Valley to begin the 2025 season. He won the International League Pitcher of the Year Award after the season.

Abel made his major league debut as the starting pitcher for the Phillies against the Pittsburgh Pirates at Citizens Bank Park on May 18, 2025. He threw six scoreless innings, striking out nine batters with no walks, and tied Curt Simmons for the most strikeouts in an MLB debut by a Phillies pitcher since at least 1901. In six starts for Philadelphia, Abel posted a 2–2 record and 5.04 ERA with 21 strikeouts over 25 innings of work.

=== Minnesota Twins ===
On July 30, 2025, the Phillies traded Abel and Eduardo Tait to the Minnesota Twins in exchange for pitcher Jhoan Durán. He appeared in four games for the Twins over the remainder of the year, posting a 1–2 record and 8.36 ERA with 18 strikeouts over 14 innings of work.

Abel made four appearances (including three starts) for Minnesota in 2026, compiling a 1–2 record and 3.98 ERA with 23 strikeouts across 20 1/3 innings pitched. On June 24, 2026, it was announced that Abel would require arthroscopic elbow surgery.
