= Orion Kerkering =

American baseball player (born 2001)

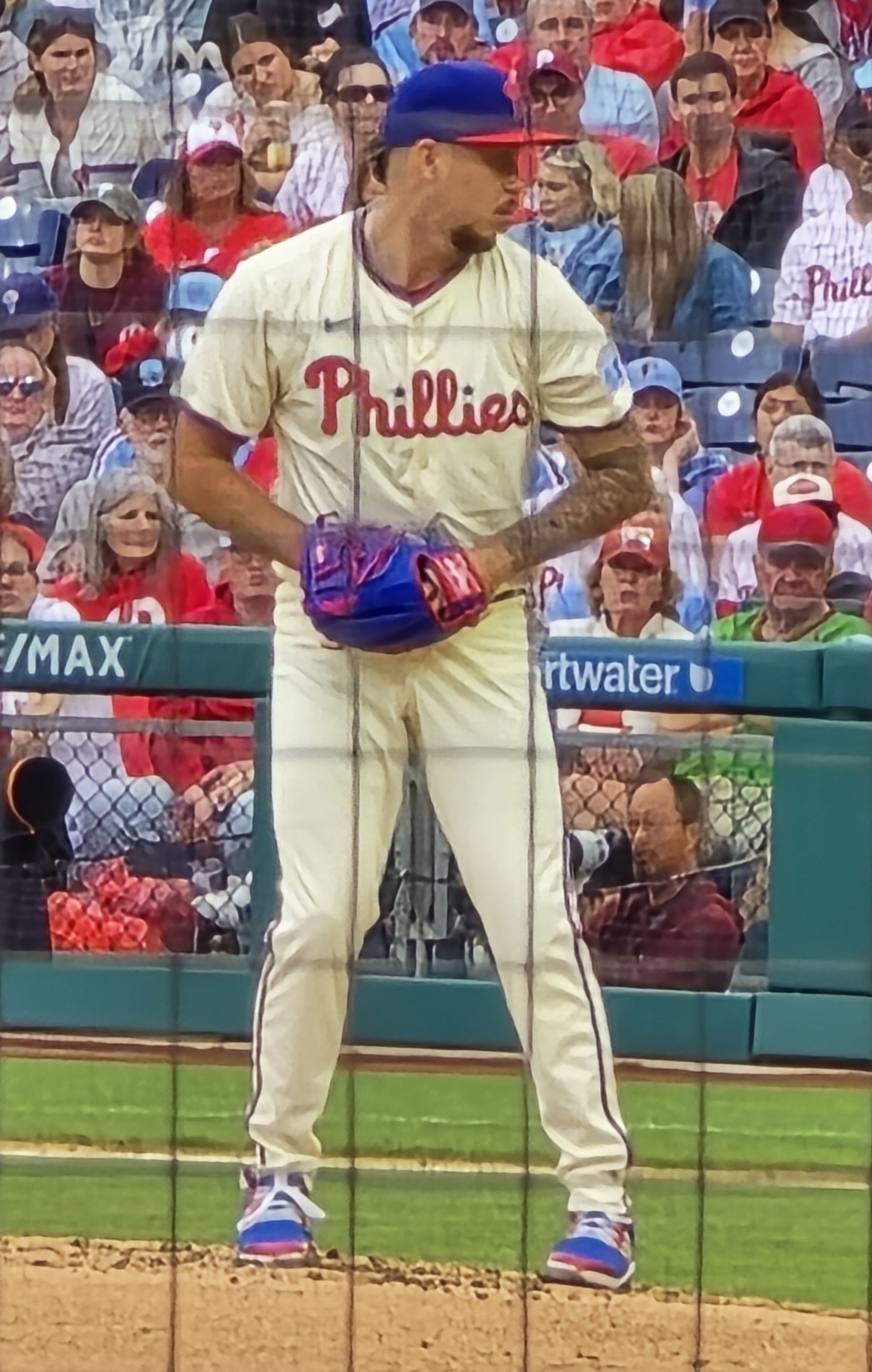
- Kerkering with Phillies in May 2025

Philadelphia Phillies – No. 50
- Pitcher
- Born: April 4, 2001 (age 25); Huntington Beach, California, U.S.
- Bats: Right Throws: Right

MLB debut
- September 24, 2023, for the Philadelphia Phillies

MLB statistics (through 2026 season)
- Win–loss record: 21–8
- Earned run average: 3.47
- Strikeouts: 208
- Stats at Baseball Reference

Teams
- Philadelphia Phillies (2023–present)

Richard Orion Kerkering (/oʊˈraɪɒn/ oh-RY-on; born April 4, 2001) is an American professional baseball pitcher for the Philadelphia Phillies of Major League Baseball (MLB). The Phillies selected Kerkering in the fifth round of the 2022 MLB draft. He made his MLB debut in 2023.

== Career ==
Kerkering attended Venice High School in Venice, Florida, and the University of South Florida, where he played college baseball for the South Florida Bulls for three seasons. He began his junior season as a starting pitcher before becoming the Bulls' closer. Kerkering made 19 appearances with 10 starts and went 5–7 with three saves and a 5.72 ERA while striking out 91 batters over 67 2/3 innings pitched. In 2021, he played collegiate summer baseball with the Orleans Firebirds of the Cape Cod Baseball League.

The Philadelphia Phillies selected Kerkering in the fifth round of the 2022 Major League Baseball draft. After signing with the team, he was assigned to the Rookie-level Florida Complex League Phillies and was later promoted to the Single-A Clearwater Threshers.

Kerkering was returned to Clearwater at the beginning of the 2023 season and was promoted to the High-A Jersey Shore BlueClaws after pitching 10 1/3 scoreless innings with 18 strikeouts over nine relief appearances to begin the season. Kerkering was later promoted to the Double-A Reading Fightin Phils, and then to the Triple-A Lehigh Valley IronPigs. In 49 combined appearances with Clearwater, Jersey Shore, Reading, and Lehigh Valley, Kerkering accumulated a 4–1 record and 1.51 ERA with 79 strikeouts and 14 saves in 53 2/3 innings pitched. Kerkering was named the winner of the organization's Paul Owens Award for pitcher for the 2023 season.

On September 22, 2023, Kerkering was selected to the 40-man roster and promoted to the major leagues for the first time. He made his MLB debut two days later pitching a 1-2-3 8th inning, including two strikeouts, against the New York Mets. On September 27, he picked up his first Major League win, after pitching a scoreless inning in a 7–6 victory over the Pittsburgh Pirates. Kerkering would be named to the team's Wild Card Series roster, and in Game 2 facing the Miami Marlins he pitched another 1-2-3 inning, again occurring in the 8th inning.

On June 16, 2025, Kerkering recorded his first career save.

On October 9, 2025, during the eleventh inning of Game 4 of the Phillies' National League Division Series against the Los Angeles Dodgers (an elimination game for Philadelphia), Kerkering committed a crucial throwing error that allowed the series-clinching run to score with two outs. On that play, Andy Pages hit a ground ball to Kerkering as J. T. Realmuto pointed at him to throw the ball at first base. Had he thrown the ball to first, the game would head into the twelfth inning. However, after dropping the ball, in a hesitant moment without thinking, Kerkering threw the ball wide to Realmuto at home plate, not realizing Hyeseong Kim was already approaching home. After making the play, he put his head down with his hands on his knees realizing the outcome of what could have been. He received massive backlash from Phillies fans during the 2025 season before limiting his comments on Instagram posts, although he did that before the NLDS. In an interview with Matt Gelb of The Athletic about that play, Kerkering said, "It's going to affect me for the rest of my life. No matter where I go. If someone's going to bring it up, it doesn't matter if it's now or in 20 years, they're going to say some shit."

In his first game back in Citizens Bank Park since the error, he was received a warm ovation from fans. In the 2026 season, after a strong first half with a 2.43 ERA entering the All-Star break, he had a disastrous second half, which included an 8.10 ERA in 22 games. This resulted in him being demoted to the minor leagues. He finished the 2026 season with a 7–1 record, an earned run average of 4.97, 17 holds, two saves in 58 innings pitched across 62 appearances.

== Personal life ==
Kerkering shares his given first name, Richard, with his father and paternal grandfather, but they all go by their middle names, all of which are different. Kerkering is one-quarter Japanese.
