= Tanner Banks =

American baseball player (born 1991)

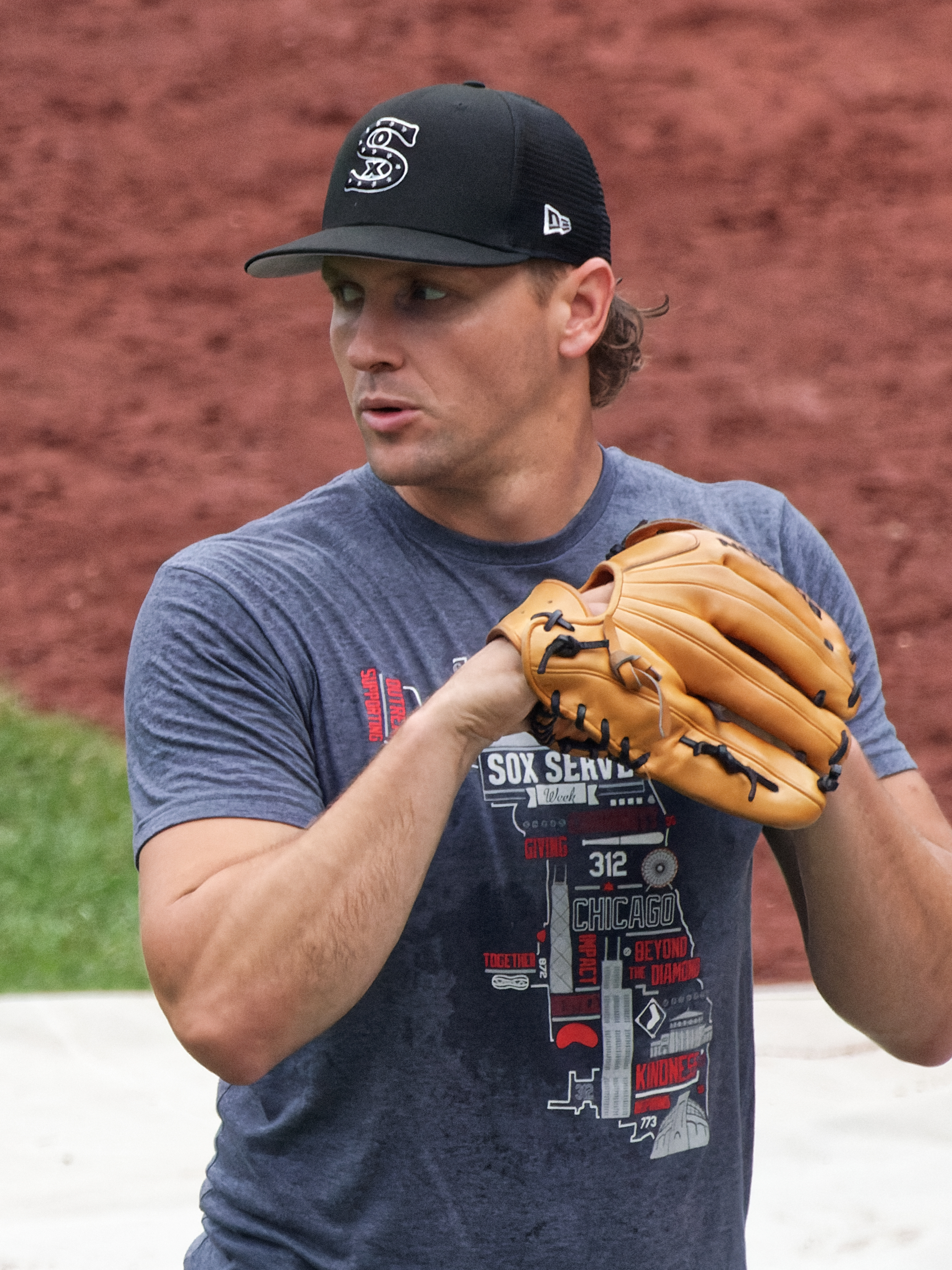
- Banks with the White Sox in 2023

Philadelphia Phillies – No. 58
- Pitcher
- Born: October 24, 1991 (age 35); Riverton, Utah, U.S.
- Bats: Right Throws: Left

MLB debut
- April 10, 2022, for the Chicago White Sox

MLB statistics (through 2026 season)
- Win–loss record: 11–13
- Earned run average: 3.97
- Strikeouts: 277
- Stats at Baseball Reference

Teams
- Chicago White Sox (2022–2024); Philadelphia Phillies (2024–present)

Tanner Pierce Banks (born October 24, 1991) is an American professional baseball pitcher for the Philadelphia Phillies of Major League Baseball (MLB). He has previously played in MLB for the Chicago White Sox. He was drafted by the White Sox in the 18th round of the 2014 MLB draft, and made his MLB debut in 2022.

== Career ==
=== College ===
Banks began his college career at Salt Lake Community College and played collegiate summer baseball with the Willmar Stingers of the Northwoods League after his freshman and sophomore years. He transferred to the University of Utah for his final two years, graduating in 2014.

=== Chicago White Sox ===
Banks was drafted by the Chicago White Sox in the 18th round, with the 528th overall selection, of the 2014 Major League Baseball draft. Banks made his professional debut with the rookie-level Arizona League White Sox and also appeared in 1 game for the Single-A Kannapolis Intimidators. In 2015, Banks split the year between Kannapolis and the rookie-level Great Falls Voyagers, logging a 5–5 record and 2.71 ERA in 22 total contests. The following year, Banks split time between Kannapolis and the High-A Winston-Salem Dash, pitching to a 12–7 record and 3.50 ERA with 116 strikeouts in 159 1/3 innings pitched across 27 starts. Banks played the 2017 season with Winston-Salem and the Double-A Birmingham Barons, posting a 10–11 record and 4.28 ERA with 113 strikeouts in 26 games (25 of them starts). In 2018, Banks returned to the two affiliates and recorded a 12–7 record and 2.59 ERA with 100 strikeouts in 146 innings of work across 23 starts.

Banks split the 2019 season between Double-A Birmingham and the Triple-A Charlotte Knights, accumulating a 6–7 record and 4.19 ERA with 88 strikeouts in 30 appearances (21 of them starts). Banks did not play in a game in 2020 due to the cancellation of the minor league season because of the COVID-19 pandemic. He spent the 2021 season with Triple-A Charlotte, logging a 4.53 ERA with 70 strikeouts in 59 2/3 innings pitched across 25 total appearances. Banks was invited to Spring Training for the 2022 season, and was initially reassigned to minor league camp prior to the season. However, on April 5, 2022, it was announced that Banks had made Chicago's Opening Day roster. He was formally selected to the 40-man roster on April 7.

On April 10, Banks made his MLB debut, pitching the final two innings of a 10–1 victory of the Detroit Tigers. Banks did not allow a run and collected four strikeouts in the game. In 35 games during his rookie campaign, Banks compiled a 2–0 record and 3.06 ERA with 49 strikeouts across 53 innings pitched.

Banks made 32 appearances for the White Sox in 2023, recording a 4.43 ERA with 51 strikeouts across 61 innings of work. Banks began the 2024 campaign in Chicago's bullpen, working to a 4.13 ERA with 55 strikeouts and two saves over 48 innings.

=== Philadelphia Phillies ===
On July 30, 2024, Banks was traded to the Philadelphia Phillies in exchange for minor league infielder William Bergolla Jr.. He made 22 appearances down the stretch for Philadelphia, logging an 0–1 record and 3.70 ERA with 23 strikeouts across 24 1/3 innings pitched.

Banks made 69 appearances (one start) for the Phillies during the 2025 season, compiling a 6–2 record and 3.07 ERA with 61 strikeouts and one save across 67 1/3 innings pitched.

On July 9, 2026, Banks was placed on the injured list due to a left forearm strain. He was transferred to the 60–day injured list on July 25. Banks was activated from the injured list on September 13.
