= Max Lazar =

American baseball player (born 1999)

Philadelphia Phillies – No. 60
- Pitcher
- Born: June 3, 1999 (age 27); Coral Springs, Florida, U.S.
- Bats: Right Throws: Right

MLB debut
- August 10, 2024, for the Philadelphia Phillies

MLB statistics (through 2026 season)
- Win–loss record: 1–1
- Earned run average: 4.98
- Strikeouts: 43
- Stats at Baseball Reference

Teams
- Philadelphia Phillies (2024–present)

Max Brandon Lazar (born June 3, 1999) is an American professional baseball pitcher for the Philadelphia Phillies of Major League Baseball (MLB). He was selected by the Milwaukee Brewers in the 11th round of the 2017 MLB draft and made his MLB debut in 2024 with the Phillies.

== Early life ==
Lazar played two years of baseball at Coral Springs High School in Coral Springs, Florida, graduating in 2017. As a pitcher he was 15–4 with an 0.81 earned run average (ERA), 186 strikeouts, and 15 walks while allowing 78 hits, in 121 2/3 innings pitched.

== Professional career ==
=== Milwaukee Brewers ===
The Milwaukee Brewers selected Lazar in the 11th round, with the 324th pick, in the 2017 Major League Baseball draft. He signed for a signing bonus of $425,000, turning down a college baseball scholarship from Florida Atlantic University. He made his professional debut that year for the Rookie-level Arizona League Brewers. Over 13 2/3 innings he gave up 9 earned runs, 16 hits, and one walk, while striking out 14 batters.

Lazar spent the 2018 season with the Helena Brewers of the Pioneer League. Lazar was 3–3 with a 4.37 ERA. In 14 starts (third most in the league), he pitched 68 innings (fourth), giving up 74 hits and 15 walks, while striking out 55 batters (10th).

Lazar was promoted to the Single-A Wisconsin Timber Rattlers to start off the 2019 season. He spent most of the season with the team, largely pitching in tandem with Reese Olson in the early part of the season, with a brief stint with the rookie level Arizona League Brewers Gold in June (in which in six innings he gave up one earned run, four hits, no walks, and had 10 strikeouts). With Wisconsin, he was 7–3 with one save and a 2.39 ERA over 19 appearances (10 starts); in 79 innings he gave up 67 hits and 15 walks (1.7 walks per 9 innings; 7th in the league), while striking out 109 batters (12.4 strikeouts per 9 innings (leading the league) and 7.27 strikeouts per walk (3rd), with a 1.038 WHIP. Lazar was named a Low–A All-Star by Baseball America following the season.

Lazar did not play in a game in 2020 due to the cancellation of the Minor League Baseball season because of the COVID-19 pandemic. He then had Tommy John surgery early in 2021 and missed the 2021 season while recovering from the surgery. Fangraphs wrote:

Ironically, he sits just 86-89 but his deceptive, funky, over-the-top delivery combined with the extreme length of his stride down the mound (nearly seven-and-a-half feet of extension) makes him an uncomfortable at-bat for opposing hitters.... Lazar can somehow turn over a changeup from this arm slot. We’ve seen plenty of fastballs thrive despite mediocre velocity before. Often it’s from someone who has an extremely vertical arm slot ... or huge extension and a flat approach angle... Lazar has both of these attributes, and has a bat-missing changeup, too.... Even if they don’t develop further, Lazar has two legit weapons that should work fine in relief, and he throws strikes at such a high rate that he could be a multi-inning bullpen piece.

Returning to action in 2022, pitching for the first time in 951 days, he started the season with the Timber Rattlers, now at the High-A level, for whom he pitched 32 innings. Lazar was placed on the injured list on June 13. He spent the rest of the season on a rehab assignment with the ACL Brewers (one inning) and the Carolina Mudcats of the Single-A Carolina League (seven innings). He split the season starting and relieving, finishing with an aggregate record among the three teams of 1–1 with one save and a 3.83 ERA in 15 appearances (9 starts). After the season, Lazar played for the Brisbane Bandits of the Australian Baseball League and was 4–3 in 10 starts with a 3.72 ERA, pitching 46 innings and giving up 38 hits and 8 walks while striking out 52 batters.

Lazar returned to Wisconsin for the start of the 2023 season, now exclusively a relief pitcher. He was promoted to the Double-A Biloxi Shuckers of the Southern League on June 30. Over the entire season between both levels, he finished with a 3.26 ERA across 33 outings, with three holds and three saves while striking out 73 batters (9.5 strikeouts per 9 innings) and walking 19 in 69 innings. Lazar elected free agency following the season on November 6.

=== Philadelphia Phillies ===
On December 8, 2023, Lazar signed a minor league contract with the Philadelphia Phillies. He started the season with the Double-A Reading Fightin Phils, where he allowed no earned runs or walks while striking out 18 batters in 10 1/3 innings over 8 appearances. He was then promoted to the Triple-A Lehigh Valley IronPigs in the International League. He was named Phillies Minor League Pitcher of the Month for June, after not allowing any earned runs in 11 appearances (12 1/3 innings), while posting an 0.49 WHIP. Lazar's fastball was 94–95 mph, and his curveball was his best pitch. Before he was promoted to the major leagues, he had a 1.79 ERA in 34 relief appearances, with 13 saves in 15 opportunities between Reading and Lehigh Valley. He had 53 strikeouts (11.8 strikeouts per 9 innings), 25 hits (5.6 hits per 9 innings), and 9 walks in 40 1/3 innings, and an 0.84 WHIP. He had a 33.8% strikeout rate and 5.8% walk rate.

On August 9, 2024, Lazar was selected to the Phillies' 40-man roster and promoted to the major leagues for the first time. He made his MLB debut the next day against the Arizona Diamondbacks. He retired all four batters he faced with a mix of curveballs, cutters, and a four-seam fastball that reached 95.5 mph, including a strikeout of Joc Pederson. In 11 appearances during his rookie campaign, Lazar recorded a 4.61 ERA with 9 strikeouts across 13 2/3 innings pitched.

Lazar was optioned to Triple-A Lehigh Valley to begin the 2025 season. He was recalled to the major leagues on May 19. Lazar earned his first MLB save on May 24, pitching in an extra-innings win over the Athletics. On July 21, Lazar recorded his first career win after tossing a scoreless inning of relief in an extra-innings victory over the Boston Red Sox. Lazar made 36 appearances for Philadelphia during the 2025 campaign, compiling a 1–1 record and 4.79 ERA with 26 strikeouts and one save across 41 1/3 innings pitched.

Lazar began the 2026 season on the injured list due to a left oblique strain. He was transferred to the 60-day injured list on April 22, 2026. Lazar was activated on June 6, and was subsequently optioned to Triple-A Lehigh Valley.

== Personal life ==
Lazar is Jewish and played for the Israeli national baseball team in the 2026 World Baseball Classic.

== See also ==
- List of Jewish Major League Baseball players
- List of Jews in Sports
- List of baseball players who underwent Tommy John surgery
