= Jhoan Durán =

Dominican baseball player (born 1998)

Philadelphia Phillies – No. 59
- Pitcher
- Born: January 8, 1998 (age 28); Esperanza, Dominican Republic
- Bats: Right Throws: Right

MLB debut
- April 8, 2022, for the Minnesota Twins

MLB statistics (through 2026 season)
- Win–loss record: 20–31
- Earned run average: 2.32
- Strikeouts: 403
- Saves: 123
- Stats at Baseball Reference

Teams
- Minnesota Twins (2022–2025); Philadelphia Phillies (2025–present)

Career highlights and awards
- All-Star (2026); All-MLB First Team (2025)

Jhoan Manuel Durán (born January 8, 1998) is a Dominican professional baseball pitcher for the Philadelphia Phillies of Major League Baseball (MLB). He has previously played in MLB for the Minnesota Twins. He made his MLB debut in 2022 with the Twins. Usually deployed as a closer, Durán was named to his first All-Star game in 2026.

== Career ==
=== Arizona Diamondbacks ===
Durán signed with the Arizona Diamondbacks as an international free agent in December 2014. He made his professional debut in 2015 with the Dominican Summer League Diamondbacks. In 2016, he played for the Arizona League Diamondbacks and the Missoula Osprey, and in 2017, he played for the Arizona League Diamondbacks and the Hillsboro Hops. He began the 2018 season with the Kane County Cougars.

=== Minnesota Twins ===
On July 27, 2018, the Diamondbacks traded Durán, Gabriel Maciel and Ernie De La Trinidad to the Minnesota Twins in exchange for Eduardo Escobar. Durán began his Twins career with the Single-A Cedar Rapids Kernels. He started the 2019 season with the High-A Fort Myers Miracle. Durán made 23 appearances (22 starts) split between Fort Myers and the Double-A Pensacola Blue Wahoos, logging a cumulative 5–12 record and 3.76 ERA with 136 strikeouts over 115 innings of work.

On November 20, 2019, the Twins added Durán to their 40-man roster to protect him from the Rule 5 draft. He did not play in a game in 2020 due to the cancellation of the minor league season because of the COVID-19 pandemic. On June 21, 2021, Durán was sidelined by Minnesota due to an elbow strain; in five games (four starts) for the Triple-A St. Paul Saints, he had posted an 0–3 record and 5.06 ERA with 22 strikeouts.

Durán secured a spot on the Twins' 2022 Opening Day roster. He made 57 appearances out of the bullpen for Minnesota during his rookie campaign, compiling a 2–4 record and 1.86 ERA with eight saves and 89 strikeouts across 67 2/3 innings pitched. In the 2023 season, Durán posted a 3–6 record with a 2.45 ERA, 27 saves in 32 opportunities, and 84 strikeouts in 62 1/3 innings over 59 appearances.

On March 28, 2024, Durán was placed by Minnesota on the 15-day injured list due to a right oblique strain. Durán was activated from the IL on April 30 as the Twins designated Matt Bowman for assignment. In 58 appearances for Minnesota, he registered a 6–9 record and 3.64 ERA with 23 saves and 66 strikeouts over 54 1/3 innings of work.

Throughout May 2025, Durán helped key Minnesota's resurgence with a lights-out month, posting a 0.60 ERA in 15 innings with a 12.00 K/9 ratio. In that span, he allowed just three runs off 12 hits while striking out 20 batters. He also locked down seven saves, tied for the most in the American League in that month. Due to that performance, Durán was named American League Reliever of the Month for the first time in his career. In 49 games for the Twins, Durán pitched 49 1/3 innings, allowing 40 hits, 13 runs, and 11 earned runs while striking out 53 batters and recording 16 saves in 18 opportunities.

=== Philadelphia Phillies ===
On July 30, 2025, the Twins traded Durán to the Philadelphia Phillies in exchange for Mick Abel and Eduardo Tait. As a member of the Phillies throughout the 2025 season in 23 games, he pitched 20 2/3 innings, allowing 18 hits, 6 runs, and 5 earned runs while striking out 27 batters and recording 16 saves in 19 opportunities. He finished the season overall with a 7–6 record, 2.06 ERA and 32 saves in 37 opportunities while striking out 80 batters.

On May 25, 2026, Duran recorded his 100th save in his major league career against the San Diego Padres.

== Personal life ==
Durán is married to Aida.

Awards and achievements
Preceded by Andrés Muñoz	American League Reliever of the Month; May 2025	Succeeded by Josh Hader
Preceded by Mason Miller	National League Reliever of the Month; June 2026	Succeeded by Mason Miller
