= Mike Calitri =

American baseball coach (born 1978)

Philadelphia Phillies – No. 95
- Coach
- Born: March 14, 1978 (age 48); Brockton, Massachusetts, U.S.

Teams
- Philadelphia Phillies (2021–present)

Michael Hennessey Calitri (born March 14, 1978) is an American professional baseball coach who currently serves as the major league field coordinator for the Philadelphia Phillies of Major League Baseball (MLB).

== Career ==
Calitri is from Canton, Massachusetts. He graduated from Xaverian Brothers High School, then attended Clemson University, where he played college baseball for the Clemson Tigers. He signed with the Cincinnati Reds as a free agent, and played for the Reds organization until 2003, when he was released by the Reds. Calitri signed with the Boston Red Sox, and was released by Boston in 2004. He returned to Clemson to complete his degree and went into sales.

Vanderbilt University hired Calitri as their director of baseball operations in 2005. In 2009, the Tampa Bay Rays hired Calitri to run their advance scouting program. In 2013, he was hired to be a professional scout for the Cleveland Indians.

In 2018, the Philadelphia Phillies hired Calitri as an advance scout. Before the 2021 season, the Phillies promoted Calitri to the major league coaching staff as a quality assurance coach. When the Phillies fired manager Joe Girardi in June 2022, they promoted bench coach Rob Thomson to interim manager and promoted Calitri to bench coach. On October 17, 2025, it was announced that Calitri would shift to the role of major league field coordinator.

== Personal life ==
Calitri lives in Tampa, Florida, with his wife and three children.
