= Johan Rojas =

Dominican baseball player (born 2000)

Philadelphia Phillies – No. 23
- Outfielder
- Born: August 14, 2000 (age 26); San Francisco de Macoris, Dominican Republic
- Bats: Right Throws: Right

MLB debut
- July 15, 2023, for the Philadelphia Phillies

MLB statistics (through 2025 season)
- Batting average: .252
- Home runs: 6
- Runs batted in: 73
- Stolen Bases: 51
- Stats at Baseball Reference

Teams
- Philadelphia Phillies (2023–2025)

Johan Stiven Rojas (born August 14, 2000) is a Dominican professional baseball outfielder for the Philadelphia Phillies of Major League Baseball (MLB). Rojas signed with the Phillies as an international free agent in 2018.

== Early life ==
Johan Stiven Rojas was born August 14, 2000, in San Francisco de Macorís, to Juan and Yaniris Rojas. Originally a shortstop, Rojas received his first baseball glove as a gift when he was 16 years old. As an adolescent, Rojas received little attention from scouts who rarely visited the Dominican Republic's rural northeast. A scout for the Philadelphia Phillies of Major League Baseball (MLB) noticed Rojas's athleticism and sprint speed while canvassing the area and invited Rojas to the team's academy in Boca Chica.

== Career ==
=== Minor leagues (2018–2023) ===
While attending their Boca Chica academy, Rojas impressed the Phillies with his energy and exit velocity on batted balls, and signed with the organization as an international free agent on January 18, 2018, for $10,000. He made his professional debut with the Dominican Summer League Phillies, posting a .321 batting average across 68 games. In 2019, Rojas played for the rookie–level Gulf Coast Phillies and Low–A Williamsport Crosscutters, batting .265/.313/.429 with 2 home runs, 15 RBI, and 14 stolen bases.

Rojas did not play in a game in 2020 due to the cancellation of the minor league season because of the COVID-19 pandemic. He returned to action in 2021 to play for the rookie–level Florida Complex League Phillies, Single–A Clearwater Threshers and High–A Jersey Shore Blue Claws. In 96 games between the three affiliates, Rojas slashed .263/.329/.417 with career–highs in home runs (11), RBI (52), and stolen bases (34).

In 2022, Rojas played for Jersey Shore and the Double–A Reading Fightin Phils, hitting .244/.309/.354 with 7 home runs, 38 RBI, and 62 stolen bases across 130 games. He played in the 2022 Arizona Fall League, where he batted .310/.423/.452, and was second in the league with 13 stolen bases, without being caught. On November 15, 2022, the Phillies added Rojas to their 40-man roster to protect him from the Rule 5 draft.

Rojas was optioned to Double-A Reading to begin the 2023 season. In 76 games for Reading, he batted .306/.361/.484 with 9 home runs, 45 RBI, and 30 stolen bases.

=== Major leagues (2023–present) ===
On July 14, 2023, Rojas was promoted to the major leagues for the first time following an injury to Cristian Pache. On August 9, Rojas caught the final out of a no-hitter thrown by Michael Lorenzen, a 7–0 shutout of the Washington Nationals. On August 11, Rojas hit his first career home run against Jordan Luplow of the Minnesota Twins. On September 26, during extra innings, Rojas recorded his first career walk-off hit. The walk-off also secured the Phillies a spot in the MLB playoffs for the second straight season. He ended the 2023 season with a regular season record of .302/.342/.430 over 59 games, with 2 home runs, 23 RBI, and 14 stolen bases, and a postseason record of .093/.114/.163 over 13 games. Following the season, Rojas was named the winner of the organization's Paul Owens Award for position player for the 2023 season.

Rojas was the Phillies' starting center fielder on Opening Day 2024 despite poor batting performance in the 2023 postseason and during 2024 spring training. When shortstop Trea Turner returned to the team from the injured list in mid-June, Rojas was optioned to Triple-A Lehigh Valley IronPigs both to make room for Turner on the roster and to allow Rojas time to improve on his offensive capabilities. He was recalled from Lehigh Valley on June 28 following injuries to Bryce Harper and Kyle Schwarber.

In 2024 Rojas batted .243/.279/.322 in MLB. He was one of the fastest players in MLB, with a sprint speed of 30.1 fps, second only to Bobby Witt Jr. He stole 25 bases and was caught stealing 4 times, in 338 at-bats.

Following the 2024 MLB season, Rojas played winter league baseball for the Gigantes del Cibao of the Dominican Professional Baseball League. During the playoffs, he played for Tigres del Licey.

On March 16, 2026, Rojas was suspended for 80 regular season games and the 2026 postseason after testing positive for boldenone. On June 10, it was announced that Rojas had suffered a torn ulnar collateral ligament and would require season-ending elbow surgery.

== Personal life ==
In August 2024, Rojas filed a grievance against his former sports agent Yasser Mendez, alleging that Mendez had engaged in financial misconduct. The grievance alleged that, while Rojas was still in the minor leagues, Mendez had convinced him to take out $875,000 in loans and invest that money into Mendez's baseball academy, advice which was "intentionally, recklessly, or negligently wrong".
