= Michael Mercado =

American baseball player (born 1999)

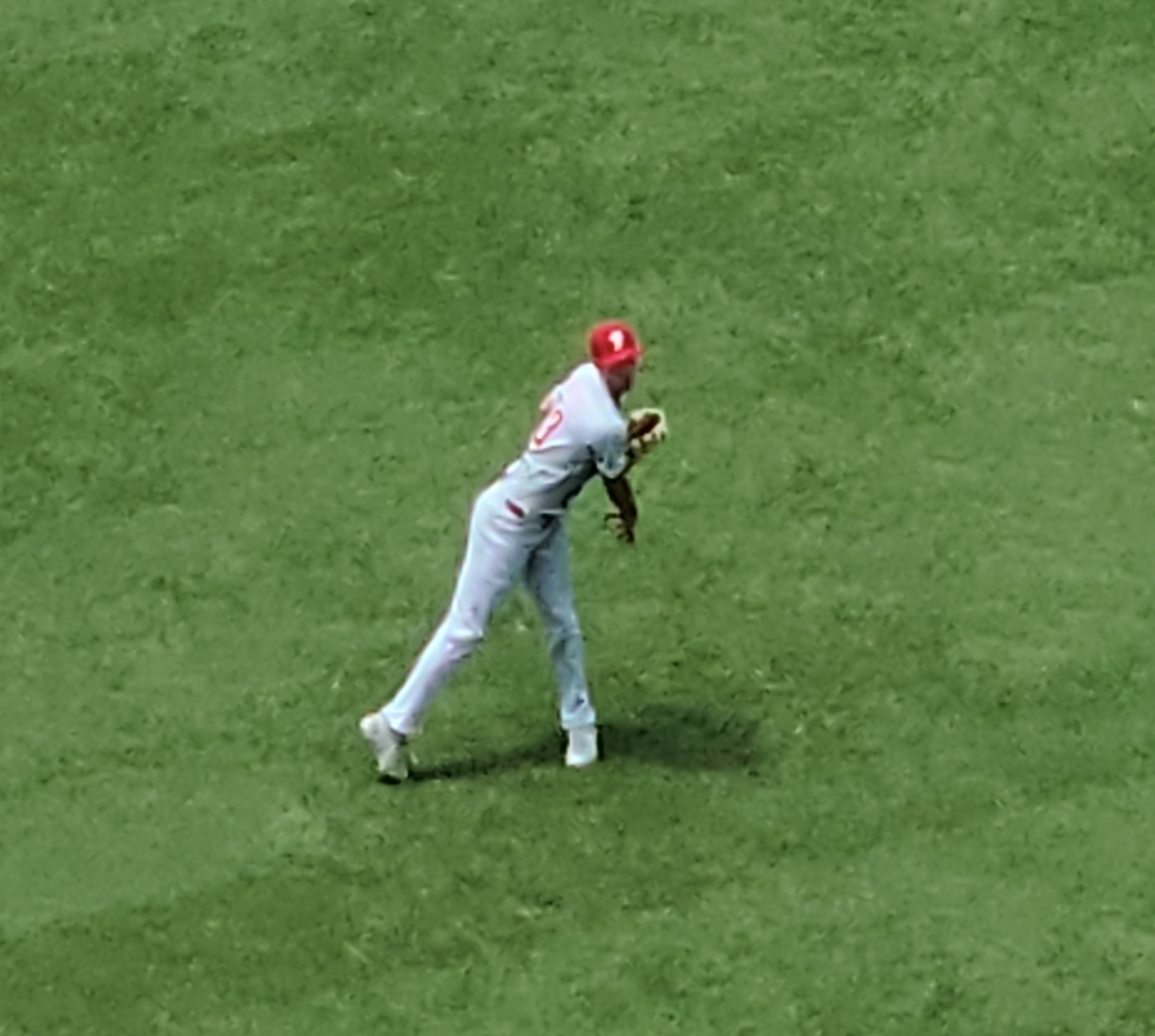
- Mercado in July 2024

Free agent
- Pitcher
- Born: April 15, 1999 (age 27); Greenville, South Carolina, U.S.
- Bats: Right Throws: Right

MLB debut
- June 24, 2024, for the Philadelphia Phillies

MLB statistics (through 2025 season)
- Win–loss record: 1–2
- Earned run average: 11.81
- Strikeouts: 14
- Stats at Baseball Reference

Teams
- Philadelphia Phillies (2024–2025)

David Michael Mercado (born April 15, 1999) is an American professional baseball pitcher who is a free agent. He made his Major League Baseball (MLB) debut in 2024.

== Career ==
=== Tampa Bay Rays ===
Mercado attended Westview High School in San Diego, California. The Tampa Bay Rays drafted Mercado in the second round, with the 40th overall selection, of the 2017 Major League Baseball draft. Though he committed to attend Stanford University, Mercado signed with the Rays rather than attend college. He made his professional debut with the rookie–level Gulf Coast League Rays, logging a 1.69 ERA across 8 starts. Mercado made 11 starts for the Low–A Hudson Valley Renegades in 2018, registering a 5.22 ERA with 38 strikeouts across 50 innings pitched.

Late in 2018, Mercado suffered a torn ulnar collateral ligament and underwent Tommy John surgery, causing him to miss the entirety of the 2019 season. As he rehabilitated and endured the COVID-19 pandemic shutdown in 2020, he did not pitch professionally again until the 2021 season.

Mercado made 22 appearances (18 starts) for the High–A Bowling Green Hot Rods in 2021, recording a 5.35 ERA with 81 strikeouts over 70 2/3 innings. He spent 2022 with the Double–A Montgomery Biscuits, compiling a 4–8 record and 4.91 ERA with 115 strikeouts across 24 games (20 starts).

Mercado split the 2023 campaign between Montgomery and the Triple–A Durham Bulls, accumulating a 4.79 ERA with 95 strikeouts and 6 saves over 52 appearances.

=== Philadelphia Phillies ===
On November 6, 2023, the Rays traded Mercado to the Philadelphia Phillies, who added him to their 40-man roster. He was optioned to the Triple–A Lehigh Valley IronPigs to begin the 2024 season. Mercado was promoted to the majors for the first time on June 23, replacing the injured Taijuan Walker. He made his major league debut the following day, pitching one scoreless inning. On June 28, the Phillies announced that Mercado would be assuming Walker's vacant slot in the rotation. On July 2, Mercado made his first start, pitching five innings and earning the win. In 5 appearances (2 starts) for Philadelphia during his rookie campaign, Mercado struggled to a 1–2 record and 11.08 ERA with 10 strikeouts across 13 innings pitched.

Mercado was optioned to Triple-A Lehigh Valley to begin the 2025 season. He made three appearances for the Phillies, but struggled to a 15.00 ERA with four strikeouts over three innings of work. On November 21, 2025, Mercado was non-tendered by Philadelphia and became a free agent.

On November 24, 2025, Mercado re-signed with the Phillies on a minor league contract. In 41 games (2 starts) between Triple-A, High-A and Single-A he threw 59.2 innings going 5-6 with a 4.22 ERA with 59 strikeouts and 3 saves. He elected free agency on November 2.

== Personal life ==
Mercado's sister, Maddie Mercado, is a professional soccer player. Their father played college tennis at UCF and their mother played at Florida.
