= 2026 Philadelphia Phillies season =

Major League Baseball season

2026 Philadelphia Phillies
- National League Wild Card
- League: National League
- Division: East
- Ballpark: Citizens Bank Park
- City: Philadelphia
- Record: 88–74 (.543)
- Divisional place: 2nd
- Owner: John Middleton
- President of baseball operations: Dave Dombrowski
- Managers: Rob Thomson (fired April 28, 2026); Don Mattingly (interim)
- Television: NBC Sports Philadelphia; NBC Sports Philadelphia + NBC Philadelphia (Tom McCarthy, Scott Franzke, John Kruk, Ben Davis, Rubén Amaro Jr., Cole Hamels, Michael Barkann, Ricky Bottalico)
- Radio: Phillies Radio Network; WIP SportsRadio 94.1 FM (English) (Scott Franzke, Larry Andersen, Kevin Stocker, Gregg Murphy); WTTM (Spanish) (Danny Martinez, Bill Kulik, Rickie Ricardo)
- Stats: ESPN.com; Baseball Reference

The 2026 Philadelphia Phillies season was the 144th season in the history of the franchise, and its 23rd season at Citizens Bank Park. Philadelphia hosted the 2026 Major League Baseball All-Star Game.

On April 28, after a 9–19 start to the season, the Phillies fired manager Rob Thomson and bench coach Don Mattingly was named the interim manager. The Phillies turned their season around under Mattingly, going 78–55 over the remainder of the regular season. However, they won just 5 for their last 15 games going into the last day of the season, with a playoff spot still not clinched.

On September 27, the last day of the season, they won their final game against the Tampa Bay Rays 7–3, knocking out the Arizona Diamondbacks to clinch the third wild card spot and a postseason appearance for the fifth consecutive season. They were defeated by their division rival Atlanta Braves in the National League Wild Card Series in three games.

== Regular season ==
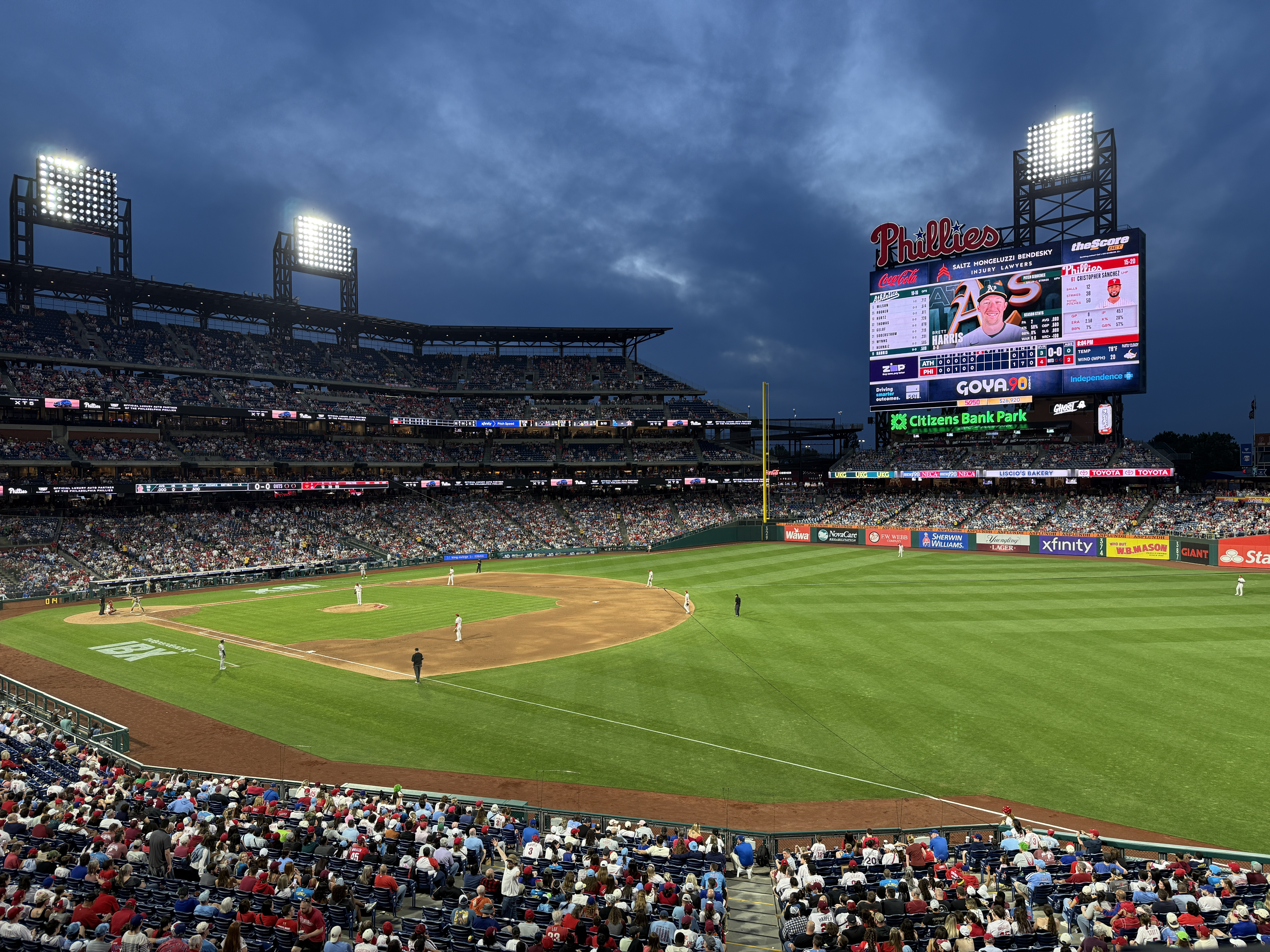
The Phillies take on the Athletics at Citizens Bank Park on May 5. The Phillies won, 9–1.

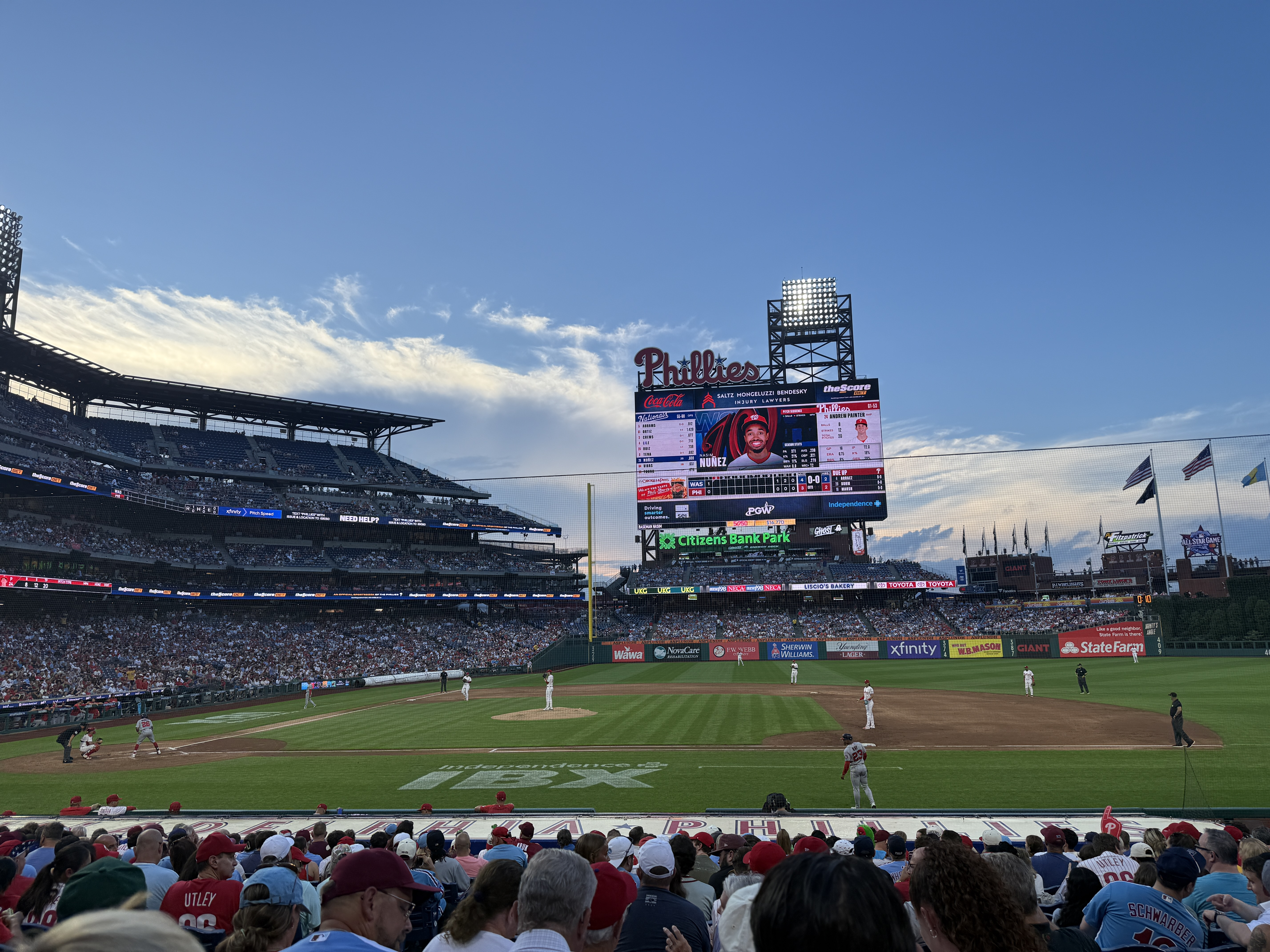
The Phillies take on the Washington Nationals at Citizens Bank Park on August 5. The Nationals won, 10–4, in 11 innings.

=== National League East ===
NL East
Team	W	L	Pct.	GB	Home	Road
Atlanta Braves	94	68	.580	—	52‍–‍29	42‍–‍39
Philadelphia Phillies	88	74	.543	6	43‍–‍38	45‍–‍36
Miami Marlins	80	82	.494	14	47‍–‍34	33‍–‍48
Washington Nationals	77	85	.475	17	39‍–‍42	38‍–‍43
New York Mets	74	88	.457	20	36‍–‍45	38‍–‍43

=== National League Playoff Leaders ===
Division leaders
Team	W	L	Pct.
Milwaukee Brewers	103	59	.636
Los Angeles Dodgers	100	62	.617
Atlanta Braves	94	68	.580

Wild Card teams (Top 3 teams qualify for postseason)
Team	W	L	Pct.	GB
San Diego Padres	91	71	.562	+3
Chicago Cubs	89	73	.549	+1
Philadelphia Phillies	88	74	.543	—
Arizona Diamondbacks	86	76	.531	2
Pittsburgh Pirates	82	80	.506	6
Miami Marlins	80	82	.494	8
St. Louis Cardinals	77	85	.475	11
Washington Nationals	77	85	.475	11
Cincinnati Reds	75	87	.463	13
New York Mets	74	88	.457	14
San Francisco Giants	65	97	.401	23
Colorado Rockies	58	104	.358	30

=== Record vs. opponents ===
2026 National League record Source: MLB Standings Grid – 2026
Team	AZ	ATL	CHC	CIN	COL	LAD	MIA	MIL	NYM	PHI	PIT	SD	SF	STL	WSH	AL
Arizona	—	4–3	2–4	4–2	9–4	7–6	1–5	2–4	4–2	3–3	3–3	6–7	10–3	5–2	2–4	24–24
Atlanta	3–4	—	3–3	3–3	6–0	5–1	9–4	3–3	6–7	9–4	5–1	3–4	1–5	2–4	9–4	27–21
Chicago	4–2	3–3	—	9–4	3–3	4–2	3–3	4–9	7–0	6–1	7–6	5–1	3–3	6–7	3–3	22–26
Cincinnati	2–4	3–3	4–9	—	4–2	1–6	3–4	4–9	4–2	3–3	6–7	3–3	3–3	5–8	1–5	29–19
Colorado	4–9	0–6	3–3	2–4	—	3–10	2–5	1–5	4–2	2–4	3–3	2–11	7–6	2–4	3–4	20–28
Los Angeles	6–7	1–5	2–4	6–1	10–3	—	2–4	3–4	5–1	4–2	5–1	8–5	9–4	2–4	6–0	31–17
Miami	5–1	4–9	3–3	4–3	5–2	4–2	—	1–5	6–7	5–8	4–2	0–6	4–2	4–2	9–4	22–26
Milwaukee	4–2	3–3	9–4	9–4	5–1	4–3	5–1	—	4–2	4–2	6–7	2–4	3–4	11–2	2–4	32–16
New York	2–4	7–6	0–7	2–4	2–4	1–5	7–6	2–4	—	6–7	4–2	4–2	5–2	2–4	7–6	23–25
Philadelphia	3–3	4–9	1–6	3–3	4–2	2–4	8–5	2–4	7–6	—	5–2	6–0	4–2	4–2	9–4	26–22
Pittsburgh	3–3	1–5	6–7	7–6	3–3	1–5	2–4	7–6	2–4	2–5	—	3–3	3–3	6–7	4–3	32–16
San Diego	7–6	4–3	1–5	3–3	11–2	5–8	6–0	4–2	2–4	0–6	3–3	—	9–4	3–4	4–2	29–19
San Francisco	3–10	5–1	3–3	3–3	6–7	4–9	2–4	4–3	2–5	2–4	3–3	4–9	—	5–1	3–3	16–32
St. Louis	2–5	4–2	7–6	8–5	4–2	4–2	2–4	2–11	4–2	2–4	7–6	4–3	1–5	—	3–3	23–25
Washington	4–2	4–9	3–3	5–1	4–3	0–6	4–9	4–2	6–7	4–9	3–4	2–4	3–3	3–3	—	28–20

Updated with the results of all games through September 27, 2026.

== Game log ==
=== Opening Day starters ===
No.	Player	Pos.
Batters
7	Trea Turner	SS
12	Kyle Schwarber	DH
3	Bryce Harper	1B
28	Alec Bohm	3B
5	Bryson Stott	2B
53	Adolis García	RF
16	Brandon Marsh	LF
10	J. T. Realmuto	C
2	Justin Crawford	CF
Starting pitcher
61	Cristopher Sánchez	

=== Regular season ===
Legend
	Phillies win
	Phillies loss
	Postponement
	Clinched playoff spot
**Bold**	Phillies team member

2026 Game Log: 88–74 (Home: 43–38; Road: 45–36)
March/April: 12–19 (Home: 8–10; Road: 4–9)

#	Date	Opponent	Score	Win	Loss	Save	Attendance	Record
1	March 26	Rangers	5–3	**Sánchez** (1–0)	Eovaldi (0–1)	**Durán** (1)	44,610	1–0
2	March 28	Rangers	4–5 (10)	Martin (1–0)	**Durán** (0–1)	Alexander (1)	40,051	1–1
3	March 29	Rangers	3–8	Gore (1–0)	**Luzardo** (0–1)	—	38,018	1–2
4	March 30	Nationals	2–13	Griffin (1–0)	**Walker** (0–1)	—	35,609	1–3
5	March 31	Nationals	3–2	**Painter** (1–0)	Littell (0–1)	**Durán** (2)	40,709	2–3
6	April 1	Nationals	6–5 (10)	**Durán** (1–1)	Henry (0–1)	—	37,469	3–3
7	April 3	@ Rockies	10–1	**Nola** (1–0)	Lorenzen (0–1)	—	48,366	4–3
8	April 4	@ Rockies	2–1	**Luzardo** (1–1)	Dollander (1–1)	**Durán** (3)	39,718	5–3
9	April 5	@ Rockies	1–4	Sugano (1–0)	**Walker** (0–2)	Vodnik (1)	29,757	5–4
10	April 6	@ Giants	6–4	**Bowlan** (1–0)	Borucki (0–1)	**Durán** (4)	32,898	6–4
11	April 7	@ Giants	0–6	Ray (2–1)	**Sánchez** (1–1)	—	32,403	6–5
12	April 8	@ Giants	0–5	Gage (1–0)	**Nola** (1–1)	—	36,106	6–6
13	April 10	Diamondbacks	4–5	Soroka (3–0)	**Luzardo** (1–2)	Sewald (4)	41,683	6–7
14	April 11	Diamondbacks	4–3	**Walker** (1–2)	Pfaadt (0–1)	**Durán** (5)	41,201	7–7
15	April 12	Diamondbacks	3–4	Clarke (1–0)	**Alvarado** (0–1)	Sewald (5)	43,060	7–8
16	April 13	Cubs	13–7	**Sánchez** (2–1)	Assad (1–1)	—	36,045	8–8
17	April 14	Cubs	4–10	Rea (2–0)	**Mayza** (0–1)	—	37,426	8–9
18	April 15	Cubs	2–11	Imanaga (1–1)	**Luzardo** (1–3)	—	38,254	8–10
19	April 17	Braves	0–9	Pérez (1–1)	**Walker** (1–3)	Suárez (1)	43,048	8–11
20	April 18	Braves	1–3	Sale (4–1)	**Sánchez** (2–2)	Suárez (1)	43,423	8–12
21	April 19	Braves	2–4	Kinley (3–0)	**Painter** (1–1)	Iglesias (5)	36,806	8–13
22	April 20	@ Cubs	1–5	Rea (3–0)	**Nola** (1–2)	—	27,798	8–14
23	April 21	@ Cubs	4–7	Imanaga (2–1)	**Banks** (0–1)	Thielbar (2)	30,651	8–15
24	April 22	@ Cubs	2–7	Brown (1–0)	**Walker** (1–4)	—	29,591	8–16
25	April 23	@ Cubs	7–8 (10)	Assad (2–1)	**Banks** (0–2)	—	31,057	8–17
26	April 24	@ Braves	3–5	Holmes (2–1)	**Painter** (1–2)	Suárez (3)	39,627	8–18
27	April 25	@ Braves	8–5 (10)	**Keller** (1–0)	Kinley (3–1)	—	39,324	9–18
28	April 26	@ Braves	2–6	Sale (5–1)	**Nola** (1–3)	—	39,213	9–19
29	April 28	Giants	7–0	**Luzardo** (2–3)	Mahle (1–4)	—	36,731	10–19
30	April 29	Giants	Postponed (rain); Makeup: April 30					
30	April 30 (1)	Giants	3–2	**Shugart** (1–0)	Walker (0–1)	—	36,861	11–19
31	April 30 (2)	Giants	6–5 (10)	**Shugart** (2–0)	Gage (2–1)	—	34,109	12–19

May: 18–10 (Home: 6–6; Road: 12–4)

#	Date	Opponent	Score	Win	Loss	Save	Attendance	Record
32	May 1	@ Marlins	6–5	**Wheeler** (1–0)	Pérez (2–3)	**Keller** (1)	15,713	13–19
33	May 2	@ Marlins	0–4	Meyer (2–0)	**Painter** (1–3)	—	15,126	13–20
34	May 3	@ Marlins	7–2	**Luzardo** (3–3)	Paddack (0–5)	—	21,662	14–20
35	May 4	@ Marlins	1–0	**Nola** (2–3)	Junk (2–3)	**Keller** (2)	7,626	15–20
36	May 5	Athletics	9–1	**Sánchez** (3–2)	Severino (2–3)	—	36,069	16–20
37	May 6	Athletics	6–3	**Kerkering** (1–0)	Perkins (2–1)	**Keller** (3)	36,474	17–20
38	May 7	Athletics	1–12	Ginn (1–1)	**Painter** (1–4)	—	37,543	17–21
39	May 8	Rockies	7–9 (11)	Vodnik (1–2)	**Keller** (1–1)	Mejía (2)	39,478	17–22
40	May 9	Rockies	9–3	**Mayza** (1–1)	Freeland (1–4)	—	38,043	18–22
41	May 10	Rockies	6–0	**Sánchez** (4–2)	Sugano (3–3)	—	44,620	19–22
42	May 12	@ Red Sox	2–1	**Wheeler** (2–0)	Morán (0–1)	**Durán** (6)	36,795	20–22
43	May 13	@ Red Sox	1–3	Gray (4–1)	**Banks** (0–3)	Chapman (9)	35,451	20–23
44	May 14	@ Red Sox	3–1	**Keller** (2–1)	Samaniego (0–1)	**Durán** (7)	31,046	21–23
45	May 15	@ Pirates	11–9 (10)	**Alvarado** (1–1)	Santana (2–3)	**Kerkering** (1)	29,998	22–23
46	May 16	@ Pirates	6–0	**Sánchez** (5–2)	Chandler (1–5)	—	31,296	23–23
47	May 17	@ Pirates	6–0	**Wheeler** (3–0)	Skenes (6–3)	—	37,820	24–23
48	May 18	Reds	5–4	**Kerkering** (2–0)	Ashcraft (1–1)	**Durán** (8)	40,065	25–23
49	May 19	Reds	1–4	Burns (6–1)	**Luzardo** (3–4)	Santillan (2)	37,527	25–24
50	May 20	Reds	4–9	Abbott (4–2)	**Nola** (2–4)	—	38,222	25–25
51	May 22	Guardians	0–1	Williams (7–3)	**Durán** (1–2)	Smith (17)	38,092	25–26
52	May 23	Guardians	3–0	**Wheeler** (4–0)	Cecconi (3–5)	**Durán** (9)	36,125	26–26
53	May 24	Guardians	1–3	Messick (6–1)	**Painter** (1–5)	Smith (18)	37,808	26–27
54	May 25	@ Padres	3–0	**Luzardo** (4–4)	Canning (0–3)	**Durán** (10)	41,293	27–27
55	May 26	@ Padres	4–3	**Nola** (3–4)	Vásquez (5–3)	**Durán** (11)	40,399	28–27
56	May 27	@ Padres	3–0	**Sánchez** (6–2)	Buehler (3–3)	**Alvarado** (1)	37,426	29–27
57	May 29	@ Dodgers	2–4	Wrobleski (7–2)	**Wheeler** (4–1)	Scott (5)	50,834	29–28
58	May 30	@ Dodgers	4–3	**Kerkering** (3–0)	Scott (1–2)	**Durán** (12)	51,794	30–28
59	May 31	@ Dodgers	1–9	Yamamoto (5–4)	**Painter** (1–6)	—	50,677	30–29

June: 18–9 (Home: 10–4; Road: 8–5)

#	Date	Opponent	Score	Win	Loss	Save	Attendance	Record
60	June 2	Padres	3–2	**Alvarado** (2–1)	Estrada (2–2)	**Durán** (13)	38,763	31–29
61	June 3	Padres	3–2	**Sánchez** (7–2)	Adam (2–1)	**Durán** (14)	40,453	32–29
62	June 4	Padres	6–4	**Wheeler** (5–1)	Giolito (2–1)	—	37,812	33–29
63	June 5	White Sox	8–6	**Bowlan** (2–0)	Hudson (3–2)	**Durán** (15)	43,232	34–29
64	June 6	White Sox	3–6	Burke (3–3)	**Painter** (1–7)	Taylor (2)	42,949	34–30
65	June 7	White Sox	9–5	**Alvarado** (3–1)	Davis (2–3)	—	41,978	35–30
66	June 8	@ Blue Jays	5–2	**Sánchez** (8–2)	Corbin (2–3)	**Durán** (16)	37,178	36–30
67	June 9	@ Blue Jays	2–3	Varland (3–1)	**Durán** (1–3)	—	41,079	36–31
68	June 10	@ Blue Jays	7–4	**Luzardo** (5–4)	Scherzer (1–4)	**Durán** (17)	35,733	37–31
69	June 12	@ Brewers	0–6	Misiorowski (8–2)	**Banks** (0–4)	—	40,205	37–32
70	June 13	@ Brewers	9–8	**Mayza** (2–1)	Drohan (3–2)	**Durán** (18)	40,157	38–32
71	June 14	@ Brewers	0–4	Harrison (8–1)	**Sánchez** (8–3)	—	40,131	38–33
72	June 15	Marlins	7–0	**Wheeler** (6–1)	Gusto (0–2)	—	39,241	39–33
73	June 16	Marlins	8–2	**Luzardo** (6–4)	Phillips (1–2)	—	38,238	40–33
74	June 17	Marlins	4–12	Alcántara (7–4)	**Painter** (1–8)	—	37,591	40–34
75	June 18	Mets	4–6	Brazobán (4–1)	**Alvarado** (3–2)	Williams (11)	39,767	40–35
76	June 20	Mets	15–3	**Sánchez** (9–3)	Peralta (5–6)	—	43,402	41–35
77	June 21	Mets	6–2	**Wheeler** (7–1)	Peterson (3–6)	—	41,552	42–35
78	June 22	@ Nationals	1–4	Griffin (8–2)	**Mayza** (2–2)	Beeter (6)	18,237	42–36
79	June 23	@ Nationals	14–9	**Kerkering** (4–0)	Lord (5–1)	—	29,611	43–36
80	June 24	@ Nationals	5–4	**Johnson** (1–0)	Lovelady (2–4)	**Durán** (19)	27,200	44–36
81	June 25	@ Nationals	10–5	**Kerkering** (5–0)	Varland (1–2)	—	28,919	45–36
82	June 26	@ Mets	2–1	**Wheeler** (8–1)	Brazobán (4–2)	**Durán** (20)	39,077	46–36
83	June 27	@ Mets	2–6	Minter (1–1)	**Rangel** (0–1)	—	37,338	46–37
84	June 28	@ Mets	5–4	**Backhus** (1–0)	Senga (0–7)	**Durán** (21)	38,770	47–37
85	June 29	Pirates	7–11	Ashcraft (8–3)	**Nola** (3–5)	—	39,791	47–38
86	June 30	Pirates	8–0	**Sánchez** (10–3)	Chandler (3–8)	—	41,710	48–38

July: 9–15 (Home: 4–7; Road: 5–8)

#	Date	Opponent	Score	Win	Loss	Save	Attendance	Record
87	July 1	Pirates	10–6	**Kerkering** (6–0)	Skenes (6–8)	—	41,766	49–38
88	July 2	Pirates	1–6	Mlodzinski (5–3)	**Alvarado** (3–3)	—	37,851	49–39
89	July 4	@ Royals	6–1	**Luzardo** (7–4)	Wacha (5–6)	—	30,419	50–39
90	July 5	@ Royals	2–5	Avila (4–3)	**Nola** (3–6)	Lange (8)	14,891	50–40
91	July 6	@ Royals	1–15	Cameron (5–6)	**Sánchez** (10–4)	—	13,496	50–41
92	July 7	@ Reds	4–1	**Wheeler** (9–1)	Abbott (5–5)	**Durán** (22)	31,204	51–41
93	July 8	@ Reds	5–11	Burns (11–1)	**Rangel** (0–2)	—	33,089	51–42
94	July 9	@ Reds	1–0	**Luzardo** (8–4)	Singer (3–9)	**Durán** (23)	19,777	52–42
95	July 10	@ Tigers	2–10	Flaherty (3–8)	**Mayza** (2–3)	—	34,084	52–43
96	July 11	@ Tigers	4–2	**Sánchez** (11–4)	Mize (4–6)	**Durán** (24)	33,705	53–43
97	July 12	@ Tigers	5–0	**Wheeler** (10–1)	Skubal (5–5)	—	35,065	54–43
–	July 14	**2026 Major League Baseball All-Star Game at Citizens Bank Park in Philadelphia, Pennsylvania**						
98	July 16	Mets	1–4	Scott (3–1)	**Nola** (3–7)	Williams (14)	40,109	54–44
99	July 18	Mets	6–1	**Luzardo** (9–4)	Manaea (2–5)	—	41,133	55–44
100	July 19	Mets	1–6	McLean (7–6)	**Rangel** (0–3)	—	40,132	55–45
101	July 20	Dodgers	10–7	**Sánchez** (12–4)	Sheehan (4–7)	—	40,265	56–45
102	July 21	Dodgers	1–2	Wrobleski (11–2)	**Wheeler** (10–2)	Scott (15)	40,077	56–46
103	July 22	Dodgers	5–9	Lauer (5–5)	**Nola** (3–8)	—	40,675	56–47
104	July 24	Yankees	0–1	Schlittler (10–6)	**Luzardo** (9–5)	Bednar (19)	43,165	56–48
105	July 25	Yankees	1–3	Weathers (4–7)	**Backhus** (1–1)	Bednar (20)	44,562	56–49
106	July 26	Yankees	11–4	**Sánchez** (13–4)	Warren (7–5)	—	42,799	57–49
107	July 27	@ Marlins	7–8	Faucher (5–5)	**Durán** (1–4)	—	11,041	57–50
108	July 28	@ Marlins	0–1	Alcántara (11–6)	**Nola** (3–9)	Fairbanks (14)	12,010	57–51
109	July 29	@ Marlins	6–8	Zuber (1–1)	**Bowlan** (2–1)	Fairbanks (15)	14,350	57–52
110	July 31	@ Orioles	4–6	Nunez (3–2)	**Kerkering** (6–1)	Wells (4)	31,857	57–53

August: 21–7 (Home: 10–3; Road: 11–4)

#	Date	Opponent	Score	Win	Loss	Save	Attendance	Record
111	August 1	@ Orioles	5–0	**Sánchez** (14–4)	Baz (4–10)	—	37,751	58–53
112	August 2	@ Orioles	8–0 (6)	**Mayza** (3–3)	Bradish (7–10)	—	31,403	59–53
113	August 3	Nationals	6–3	**Backhus** (2–1)	Cosgrove (0–1)	**Durán** (25)	41,115	60–53
114	August 4	Nationals	5–0	**Luzardo** (10–5)	Palmquist (0–2)	—	38,731	61–53
115	August 5	Nationals	4–10 (11)	Beeter (4–3)	**Kilian** (3–7)	—	37,025	61–54
116	August 6	Nationals	7–3	**Sánchez** (15–4)	Mikolas (3–9)	—	40,301	62–54
117	August 7	Blue Jays	4–5	Estrada (1–0)	**Wheeler** (10–3)	Rogers (4)	43,641	62–55
118	August 8	Blue Jays	5–7 (11)	Varland (5–4)	**Shugart** (2–1)	Estrada (1)	40,010	62–56
119	August 9	Blue Jays	7–6 (12)	**Kilian** (4–7)	Estrada (1–1)	—	40,398	63–56
120	August 10	@ Cardinals	6–5	**Painter** (2–8)	Dobbins (2–3)	**Bowlan** (1)	26,903	64–56
121	August 11	@ Cardinals	0–2	Soriano (6–3)	**McFarlane** (0–1)	O'Brien (30)	27,222	64–57
122	August 12	@ Cardinals	1–7	Leahy (9–4)	**Wheeler** (10–4)	—	22,565	64–58
123	August 13	@ Twins*	7–1	**Nola** (4–9)	Bradley (9–5)	—	7,163	65–58
124	August 15	@ Twins	9–1	**Luzardo** (11–5)	Prielipp (3–6)	—	29,218	66–58
125	August 16	@ Twins	7–5	**Kerkering** (7–1)	Morris (4–4)	**Durán** (26)	29,614	67–58
126	August 17	Marlins	6–5	**Sánchez** (16–4)	Junk (6–8)	**Durán** (27)	37,544	68–58
127	August 18	Marlins	6–4	**McFarlane** (1–1)	Petersen (2–3)	**Raley** (1)	39,237	69–58
128	August 19	Marlins	4–1	**Nola** (5–9)	Alcántara (13–8)	**Durán** (28)	37,031	70–58
129	August 21	Cardinals	7–6 (10)	**McFarlane** (2–1)	Gastélum (3–3)	—	44,802	71–58
130	August 22	Cardinals	12–3	**Painter** (3–8)	Mathews (0–2)	—	42,218	72–58
131	August 23	Cardinals	6–4	**McFarlane** (3–1)	O'Brien (3–5)	—	42,610	73–58
132	August 24	@ Mariners	2–9	Gilbert (11–7)	**Wheeler** (10–5)	—	35,293	73–59
133	August 25	@ Mariners	1–4	Kirby (9–10)	**Nola** (5–10)	Muñoz (24)	37,600	73–60
134	August 26	@ Mariners	6–0	**Luzardo** (12–5)	Woo (9–9)	—	33,642	74–60
135	August 28	@ Angels	5–3	**McFarlane** (4–1)	Joyce (0–2)	**Bowlan** (2)	34,951	75–60
136	August 29	@ Angels	4–2 (10)	**Durán** (2–4)	Martin (0–1)	—	38,677	76–60
137	August 30	@ Angels	5–2	**Wheeler** (11–5)	Kikuchi (0–5)	**Kerkering** (2)	31,035	77–60
138	August 31	@ Diamondbacks	2–1	**Nola** (6–10)	Pfaadt (7–2)	**Durán** (29)	21,314	78–60
*August 13 game played at Field of Dreams in Dyersville, Iowa

September: 10–14 (Home: 5–8; Road: 5–6)

#	Date	Opponent	Score	Win	Loss	Save	Attendance	Record
139	September 1	@ Diamondbacks	7–1	**Luzardo** (13–5)	Rodríguez (14–5)	—	27,395	79–60
140	September 2	@ Diamondbacks	0–1	Loáisiga (6–3)	**Bowlan** (2–2)	Morillo (3)	19,039	79–61
141	September 4	Braves	2–5	Sale (14–9)	**Sánchez** (16–5)	Iglesias (30)	41,883	79–62
142	September 5	Braves	4–2	**Wheeler** (12–5)	Pérez (8–9)	**Durán** (30)	43,241	80–62
143	September 6	Braves	4–5	Lee (6–0)	**Durán** (2–5)	Iglesias (31)	42,793	80–63
144	September 7	Braves	1–0	**Luzardo** (14–5)	Fuentes (5–2)	—	41,820	81–63
145	September 8	Astros	5–6	Wesneski (5–1)	**Painter** (3–9)	Hader (24)	39,262	81–64
146	September 9	Astros	11–7	**Sánchez** (17–5)	King (2–5)	—	38,642	82–64
147	September 10	Astros	1–2	Abreu (6–3)	**Durán** (2–6)	Hader (25)	37,100	82–65
148	September 11	@ Braves	5–6 (11)	Fuentes (7–2)	**Raley** (5–6)	—	40,161	82–66
149	September 12	@ Braves	2–12	Mahle (6–10)	**Raley** (5–7)	—	40,863	82–67
150	September 13	@ Braves	9–4	**Alvarado** (4–3)	Lee (6–1)	—	39,830	83–67
151	September 15	@ Nationals	3–6	Lovelady (3–4)	**Sánchez** (17–6)	Tolman (3)	23,952	83–68
152	September 16	@ Nationals	3–0	**Wheeler** (13–5)	Simpson (1–1)	**Durán** (31)	23,007	84–68
153	September 17	@ Mets	3–0	**Nola** (7–10)	McLean (11–10)	**Durán** (32)	32,044	85–68
154	September 18	@ Mets	3–6	Thornton (5–5)	**Mayza** (3–4)	Núñez (1)	29,764	85–69
155	September 19	@ Mets	3–10	Yan (2–1)	**Painter** (3–10)	—	37,468	85–70
156	September 20	@ Mets	7–2	**Sánchez** (18–6)	Tong (2–2)	—	33,611	86–70
157	September 22	Brewers	6–4	**Alvarado** (5–3)	Gordon (0–1)	**Durán** (33)	37,132	87–70
158	September 23	Brewers	1–4	Henderson (11–3)	**Nola** (7–11)	Megill (30)	37,271	87–71
159	September 24	Brewers	1–5	Romero (3–3)	**Alvarado** (5–4)	Senzatela (4)	37,177	87–72
160	September 25	Rays	0–2	Peralta (10–11)	**Sánchez** (18–7)	Baker (41)	40,133	87–73
161	September 26	Rays	1–12	Matz (6–6)	**Nola** (7–12)	—	43,076	87–74
162	September 27	Rays	7–3	**Wheeler** (14–5)	Martinez (15–6)	—	42,146	88–74

== Postseason ==
=== Game log ===
2026 Postseason Game Log: 1–2 (Home: 0–0; Away: 1–2)
NL Wild Card Series: 1–2 (Home: 0–0; Away: 1–2)

#	Date	Opponent	Score	Win	Loss	Save	Attendance	Record
1	September 29	@ Braves	3–5	Lee (1–0)	Durán (0–1)	Iglesias (1)	30,127	0–1
2	September 30	@ Braves	4–3 (10)	Painter (1–0)	Fuentes (0–1)	—	37,150	1–1
3	October 1	@ Braves	2–6	Holmes (1–0)	Nola (0–1)	—	41,731	1–2

=== Postseason rosters ===
Playoff rosters
National League Wild Card Series

- Pitchers: 46 José Alvarado 19 Kyle Backhus 58 Tanner Banks 52 Jonathan Bowlan 59 Jhoan Durán 50 Orion Kerkering 44 Jesús Luzardo 37 Tim Mayza 71 Alex McFarlane 27 Aaron Nola 24 Andrew Painter 61 Cristopher Sánchez 55 Chase Shugart 45 Zack Wheeler
- Catchers: 13 Rafael Marchán 10 J. T. Realmuto 21 Garrett Stubbs
- Infielders: 28 Alec Bohm 31 Otto Kemp 33 Edmundo Sosa 5 Bryson Stott 7 Trea Turner
- Outfielders: 2 Justin Crawford 41 Bryan De La Cruz 3 Bryce Harper 49 Derek Hill 16 Brandon Marsh
- Designated hitters: 12 Kyle Schwarber

== Roster ==
All players who made an appearance for the Phillies during 2026 are included.

2026 Philadelphia Phillies
Roster
Pitchers: 46 José Alvarado; 19 Kyle Backhus; 58 Tanner Banks; 52 Jonathan Bowlan; 59 Jhoan Durán; 47 Nolan Hoffman; 51 Grant Holman; 51 Seth Johnson; 40,48 Brad Keller; 50 Orion Kerkering; 56 Caleb Kilian; 60 Max Lazar; 44 Jesús Luzardo; 37 Tim Mayza; 71 Alex McFarlane; 27 Aaron Nola; 24 Andrew Painter; 56 Zach Pop; 30 Brooks Raley; 57 Alan Rangel; 43 Trevor Richards; 61 Cristopher Sánchez; 55 Chase Shugart; 22 Lou Trivino; 70 José Urquidy; 99 Taijuan Walker; 45 Zack Wheeler; 48 Bryse Wilson	Catchers: 13 Rafael Marchán; 10 J. T. Realmuto; 21 Garrett Stubbs; Infielders: 4 Luis Arráez; 28 Alec Bohm; 3 Bryce Harper; 4 Otto Kemp; 12 Kyle Schwarber; 33 Edmundo Sosa; 5 Bryson Stott; 7 Trea Turner	Outfielders: 39 Steward Berroa; 2 Justin Crawford; 41 Bryan De La Cruz; 53 Adolis García; 49 Derek Hill; 4 Otto Kemp; 16 Brandon Marsh; 25 Dylan Moore; 29 Félix Reyes; 17 Gabriel Rincones Jr.	Manager: 8 Don Mattingly; 49 Rob Thomson; Coaches: 95 Mike Calitri (major league field coordinator); 88 Anthony Contreras (third base); 65 Caleb Cotham (pitching); 9 Bobby Dickerson (infield); 38 Paco Figueroa (first base); 97 Brad Flanders (bullpen catcher); 54 Kevin Long (hitting); 96 Edwar Gonzalez (assistant hitting); 93 Mark Lowy (assistant pitching); 8 Don Mattingly (bench); 94 Rafael Pena (assistant hitting); 98 Hector Rabago (bullpen catcher); 91 Cesar Ramos (bullpen); 62 Dusty Wathan (third base) (bench)

== Player stats ==
= Indicates team leader

= Indicates league leader

=== Batting ===
Note: G = Games played; AB = At bats; R = Runs scored; H = Hits; 2B = Doubles; 3B = Triples; HR = Home runs; RBI = Runs batted in; SB = Stolen bases; BB = Walks; AVG = Batting average; SLG = Slugging average

Player	G	AB	R	H	2B	3B	HR	RBI	SB	BB	AVG	SLG
Trea Turner	157	645	101	156	29	1	19	58	21	48	.242	.378
Kyle Schwarber	156	581	95	135	20	1	45	97	3	105	.232	.503
Bryce Harper	162	577	93	155	32	3	29	87	7	107	.269	.485
Alec Bohm	155	567	58	141	29	1	15	88	2	48	.249	.383
Bryson Stott	155	536	71	137	36	6	10	67	27	62	.256	.401
Brandon Marsh	155	524	71	136	20	2	18	62	11	34	.260	.408
Justin Crawford	149	425	48	112	19	5	3	41	17	27	.264	.353
J.T. Realmuto	123	414	52	85	19	0	11	51	3	37	.205	.331
Edmundo Sosa	84	231	31	57	11	2	9	44	4	7	.247	.429
Adolis García	67	231	21	45	8	1	7	21	3	21	.195	.329
Luis Arráez	46	176	15	49	10	0	2	21	0	9	.278	.369
Derek Hill	67	119	19	31	4	1	7	23	6	6	.261	.487
Rafael Marchán	34	91	5	9	0	0	2	6	0	2	.099	.165
Gabriel Rincones Jr.	29	84	7	14	4	0	2	7	0	2	.167	.286
Bryan De La Cruz	34	75	10	21	4	0	2	12	0	7	.280	.413
Garrett Stubbs	35	59	11	9	0	0	0	3	0	3	.153	.153
Félix Reyes	12	38	2	6	1	0	1	2	0	0	.158	.263
Otto Kemp	13	25	0	2	0	0	0	0	0	1	.080	.080
Dylan Moore	13	12	3	0	0	0	0	0	1	3	.000	.000
Steward Berroa	6	7	0	1	0	0	0	1	0	0	.143	.143
Totals	162	5417	713	1301	246	23	182	691	105	529	.240	.395

=== Pitching ===
Note: W = Wins; L = Losses; ERA = Earned run average; G = Games pitched; GS = Games started; SV = Saves; IP = Innings pitched; H = Hits allowed; R = Runs allowed; ER = Earned runs; BB = Walks allowed; SO = Strikeouts

Player	W	L	ERA	G	GS	SV	IP	H	R	ER	BB	SO
Cristopher Sánchez	18	7	2.91	33	33	0	207.0	204	73	67	45	231
Jesús Luzardo	14	5	2.86	30	29	0	179.2	141	65	57	52	221
Aaron Nola	7	12	4.67	33	33	0	175.1	177	93	91	59	177
Zach Wheeler	14	5	3.00	28	28	0	162.0	123	55	54	47	193
Andrew Painter	3	10	5.40	25	23	0	126.2	132	76	76	47	115
Tim Mayza	3	4	3.48	60	6	0	67.1	58	28	26	18	64
Jhoan Durán	2	6	1.82	61	0	33	59.1	49	14	12	10	84
José Alvarado	5	4	5.86	68	0	1	58.1	65	40	38	31	70
Orion Kerkering	7	1	4.97	62	0	2	58.0	50	36	32	34	63
Jonathan Bowlan	2	2	3.36	59	0	2	56.1	43	23	21	15	73
Chase Shugart	2	1	4.02	46	0	0	53.2	43	28	24	20	59
Tanner Banks	0	4	6.19	32	1	0	36.1	52	29	25	15	38
Brad Keller	2	1	4.02	32	0	3	31.1	29	15	14	13	32
Alan Rangel	0	3	5.88	7	3	0	26.0	31	17	17	13	29
Taijuan Walker	1	4	9.13	5	4	0	22.2	36	25	23	11	17
Kyle Backhus	2	1	4.95	21	1	0	20.0	25	12	11	6	20
Alex McFarlane	4	1	2.84	19	0	0	19.0	15	8	6	7	20
Seth Johnson	1	0	5.51	16	0	0	16.1	15	12	10	14	20
Brooks Raley	0	2	7.94	16	0	1	11.1	17	10	10	5	11
Max Lazar	0	0	6.30	8	0	0	10.0	12	7	7	3	8
Zach Pop	0	0	3.68	7	1	0	7.1	5	3	3	3	6
José Urquidy	0	0	3.68	2	0	0	7.1	10	3	3	0	9
Garrett Stubbs	0	0	9.64	5	0	0	4.2	8	5	5	1	0
Nolan Hoffman	0	0	3.86	3	0	0	4.2	6	2	2	3	2
Trevor Richards	0	0	2.08	2	0	0	4.1	4	1	1	3	5
Caleb Kilian	1	1	13.50	4	0	0	3.1	4	7	5	2	3
Lou Trivino	0	0	12.00	3	0	0	3.0	4	4	4	4	4
Brian Keller	0	0	3.00	1	0	0	3.0	2	1	1	0	3
Bryse Wilson	0	0	0.00	1	0	0	2.0	1	0	0	1	0
Dylan Moore	0	0	5.40	2	0	0	1.2	1	1	1	1	0
Grant Holman	0	0	0.00	1	0	0	0.1	4	5	0	1	0
Totals	88	74	4.04	162	162	42	1438.1	1366	698	646	484	1577

== Farm system ==
Level	Team	League	Manager
AAA	Lehigh Valley IronPigs	International League	Chris Adamson
AA	Reading Fightin Phils	Eastern League	Al Pedrique
High A	Jersey Shore BlueClaws	South Atlantic League	Mycal Jones
Low-A	Clearwater Threshers	Florida State League	Aaron Barrett
Rookie	FCL Phillies	Florida Complex League	Wilson Ramos
Rookie	DSL Phillies	Dominican Summer League	Felix Castillo
