= 2026 National League Wild Card Series =

Teams
Team (Wins)		Manager	Season
Atlanta Braves (2)		Walt Weiss	94–68 (.580), GA: 6
Philadelphia Phillies (1)		Don Mattingly	88–74 (.543), GB: 6
- Dates: September 29–October 1
- Television: NBC
- TV announcers: Matt Vasgersian, C. J. Nitkowski, John Kruk, Joey Votto, and Ashley ShahAhmadi
- Radio: ESPN
- Radio announcers: Dave O'Brien and Jessica Mendoza
- Umpires: Jordan Baker (crew chief), Adam Beck, Nestor Ceja, Dan Merzel, Charlie Ramos, Mark Ripperger

Teams
Team (Wins)		Manager	Season
San Diego Padres (2)		Craig Stammen	91–71 (.562), GB: 9
Chicago Cubs (0)		Craig Counsell	89–73 (.549), GB: 14
- Dates: September 29–30
- Television: NBCSN
- TV announcers: Dave Flemming, Jim Deshaies, Mark Grant, Clayton Kershaw, and John Fanta
- Radio: ESPN
- Radio announcers: Jon Sciambi and Doug Glanville
- Umpires: Erich Bacchus, Ramon De Jesus, Rob Drake, Chad Fairchild, Bill Miller (crew chief), Clint Vondrak

The 2026 National League Wild Card Series were the two best-of-three playoff series in Major League Baseball’s (MLB) 2026 postseason to determine the participating teams of the 2026 National League Division Series (NLDS). Both Wild Card Series began on September 29, with Game 2s scheduled for September 30. NBC broadcast both Wild Card Series in the United States together with ESPN Radio.

These matchups were:

- (3) Atlanta Braves (NL East champions) vs. (6) Philadelphia Phillies (third wild card): Braves won the series, 2–1.
- (4) San Diego Padres (first wild card) vs. (5) Chicago Cubs (second wild card): Padres won the series, 2–0.

== Background ==
The lowest-seeded division winner and three wild card teams in each league play in a best-of-three series after the end of the regular season. The winners of each league's wild card rounds advance to face the two best division winners in that league's Division Series.

The Atlanta Braves (94–68) returned to the postseason on September 18 after missing out entirely in 2025 and won the National League East for the first time since 2023 on September 20 after a road victory against the Houston Astros. Overall, this was their eighth postseason appearance in the last nine seasons (2018–2024; 2026). With the worst record among the three National League division winners, they were seeded third, and they played host to the sixth seed Philadelphia Phillies (88–74), who clinched their fifth consecutive postseason appearance on September 27, the last day of the season. The Phillies have defeated the Braves in all three prior postseason meetings between the clubs (1993 NLCS, 2022 NLDS, and 2023 NLDS), though the Braves claimed the season series, 9–4.

The San Diego Padres (91–71) clinched a postseason berth on September 24 by defeating the Los Angeles Dodgers on the road, 4–2. This was their fifth postseason appearance in the last six years (2020, 2022, 2024–2026), with all coming as Wild Card entrants. The Chicago Cubs (89–73) clinched their second consecutive postseason spot on September 24 in a home win against the Miami Marlins on September 26. The Padres-Cubs meeting was a rematch of last year's Wild Card Series, in which the Cubs won in three games at Wrigley Field was officially locked in after the Phillies lost to the Tampa Bay Rays and San Diego clinched home-field advantage by beating Arizona Diamondbacks. Each team has defeated one another in the postseason; the Cubs won the aforementioned Wild Card Series last season and the Padres defeated the Cubs in the 1984 National League Championship Series to earn their first World Series appearance. The Cubs won the season series, 5–1.

The Milwaukee Brewers (103–59) and the Los Angeles Dodgers (100–62) both earned first-round byes into the National League Division Series as the top two division winners record-wise in the National League. They were both the first 100-win game winners in MLB since 2023.

== Matchups ==
=== Atlanta Braves vs. Philadelphia Phillies ===
Atlanta won the series, 2–1.

Game	Date	Score	Location	Time	Attendance
1	September 29	Philadelphia Phillies – 3, Atlanta Braves – 5	Truist Park	2:26	30,127
2	September 30	Philadelphia Phillies – 4, Atlanta Braves – 3 (10)	Truist Park	3:03	37,150
3	October 1	Philadelphia Phillies – 2, Atlanta Braves – 6	Truist Park	2:46	41,731

=== San Diego Padres vs. Chicago Cubs ===
San Diego won the series, 2–0.

Game	Date	Score	Location	Time	Attendance
1	September 29	Chicago Cubs – 0, San Diego Padres – 8	Petco Park	2:40	47,048
2	September 30	Chicago Cubs – 1, San Diego Padres – 4	Petco Park	2:50	47,513

== Atlanta vs. Philadelphia ==
This was the fourth postseason matchup between the Atlanta Braves and the Philadelphia Phillies. The Phillies defeated the Braves in all three previous matchups (1993 NLCS, 2022 NLDS, and 2023 NLDS).

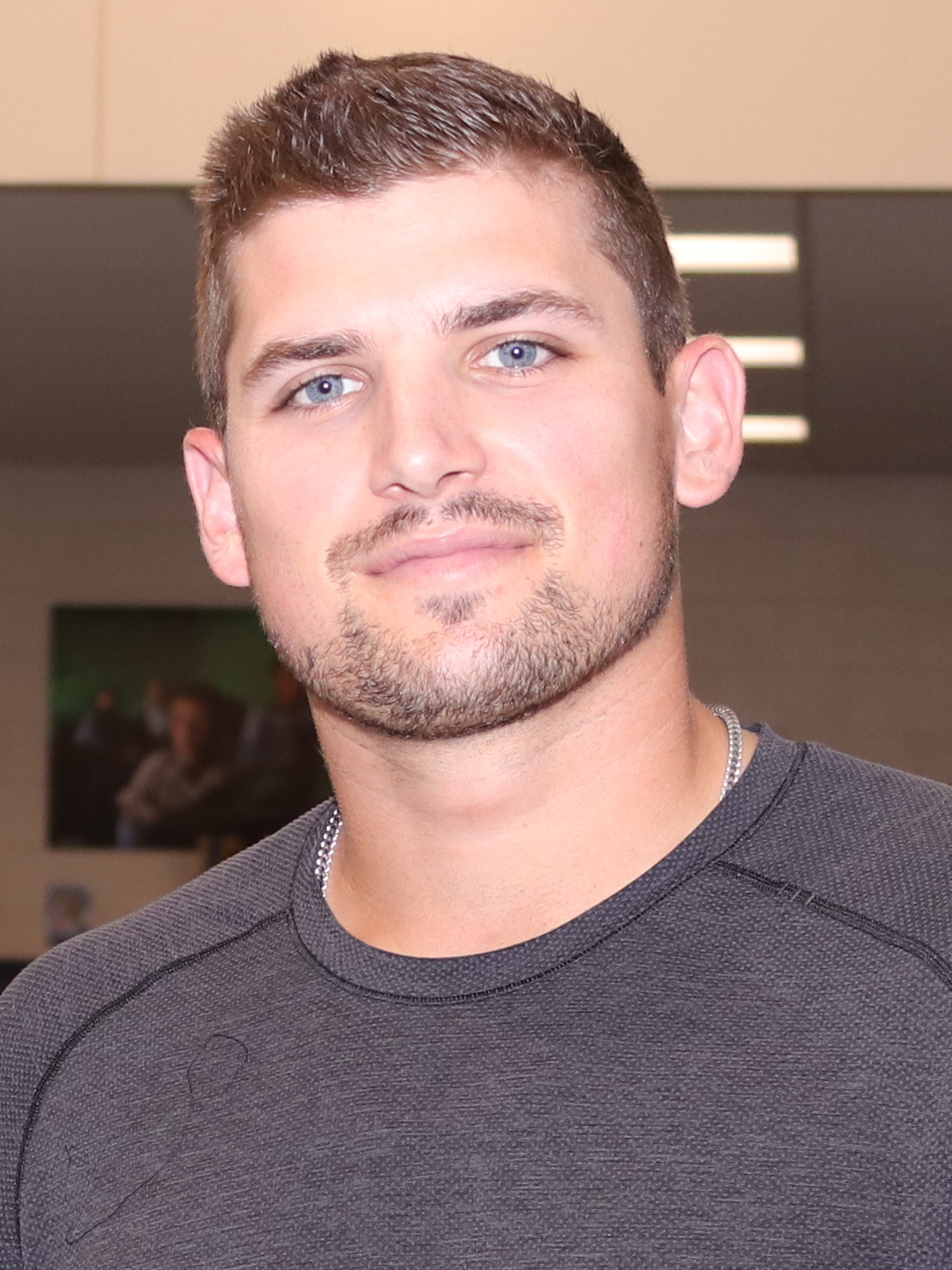
Austin Riley's three-run home run in the 8th turned a Braves' one run deficit into a two run lead and eventual win.

=== Game 1 ===
September 29, 2026 2:15 pm (EDT) at Truist Park in Cumberland, Georgia 80 °F (27 °C), Sunny
Team	1	2	3	4	5	6	7	8	9	R	H	E
Philadelphia	1	0	0	0	0	0	2	0	0	3	6	0
Atlanta	0	1	0	0	0	1	0	3	X	5	7	0
WP: Dylan Lee (1–0) LP: Jhoan Durán (0–1) Sv: Raisel Iglesias (1); Home runs: PHI: None; ATL: Austin Riley (1); Attendance: 30,127; Boxscore

In the top of the first inning, Alec Bohm doubled home Kyle Schwarber to give the Phillies an early lead. The Braves tied the game in the bottom of the second when Mike Yastrzemski singled in Ozzie Albies. Phillies starting pitcher Jesús Luzardo pitched five innings, allowing three hits and one run while striking out six batters.

In the bottom of the sixth, Albies hit an RBI triple to drive in Michael Harris II, putting Atlanta ahead 2–1. Braves starter Chris Sale pitched 6 1/3 innings, giving up four hits and three runs while striking out nine batters; it marked both the longest postseason start and the most strikeouts in a postseason game of Sale's career. The Phillies reclaimed the lead in the top of the seventh when J. T. Realmuto tripled home Bryan De La Cruz and Bryson Stott to make it 3–2.

Atlanta rallied in the bottom of the eighth when Austin Riley hit a three-run home run off a 99 mph fastball from Jhoan Durán, putting the Braves ahead 5–3. The blast was Riley's third career go-ahead home run in the eighth inning or later during the postseason, breaking a franchise tie with Chipper Jones and Javy López. Closer Raisel Iglesias pitched a scoreless ninth inning to secure the save, giving the Braves Game 1 of the series. Relief pitcher Dylan Lee earned the victory after throwing a scoreless top of the eighth with one strikeout.

This was the Braves' first Game 1 win against the Phillies in four tries.

=== Game 2 ===
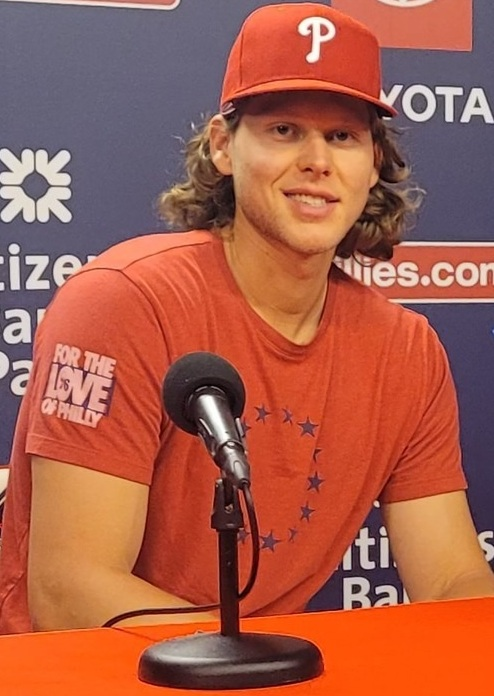
Alec Bohm's solo home run in the 10th sent the series to a third and final game for the Phillies.

September 30, 2026 2:16 pm (EDT) at Truist Park in Cumberland, Georgia 84 °F (29 °C), Partly Cloudy
Team	1	2	3	4	5	6	7	8	9	10	R	H	E
Philadelphia	1	0	0	0	0	0	0	2	0	1	4	12	0
Atlanta	1	0	0	0	0	0	2	0	0	0	3	9	0
WP: Andrew Painter (1–0) LP: Didier Fuentes (0–1); Home runs: PHI: Kyle Schwarber (1), Bryce Harper (1), Alec Bohm (1); ATL: None; Attendance: 37,150; Boxscore

In the top of the first, Bryce Harper drove in Trea Turner with an RBI single, staking the Phillies to an early 1–0 advantage. In the bottom of the first, Ronald Acuña Jr. walked, proceeded to steal second and third base, and scored on an RBI single by Matt Olson, tying the game at 1–1.

In the bottom of the sixth inning, the Phillies escaped a bases-loaded jam with a 3–2–3 double play to keep the game tied at 1–1. Sean Murphy scored in the bottom of the seventh inning on an RBI double by Drake Baldwin to give the Braves a 2–1 lead. Ha-Seong Kim later scored on a sacrifice fly by Olson to extend the Braves' lead to 3–1.

Cristopher Sánchez pitched 6 2/3 innings, giving up six hits and three runs while walking five and striking out six batters. Tyler Mahle pitched seven innings for Atlanta, giving up six hits and one run while striking out six batters. Kyle Schwarber and Bryce Harper hit back-to-back home runs off Dylan Lee in the top of the eighth inning to tie the game at three apiece.

Alec Bohm hit a two-out solo home run off Didier Fuentes to give the Phillies a 4–3 lead in the top of the tenth inning. Andrew Painter came in to pitch three innings of relief, giving up three hits and no runs while striking out three batters. It was Painter's first postseason appearance and win of his career and sent the series to a winner-take-all Game 3. The game ended on an ABS challenge when a ball for Dominic Smith was overturned to a game-ending strikeout, which was the first postseason game to end on an ABS challenge call.

=== Game 3 ===
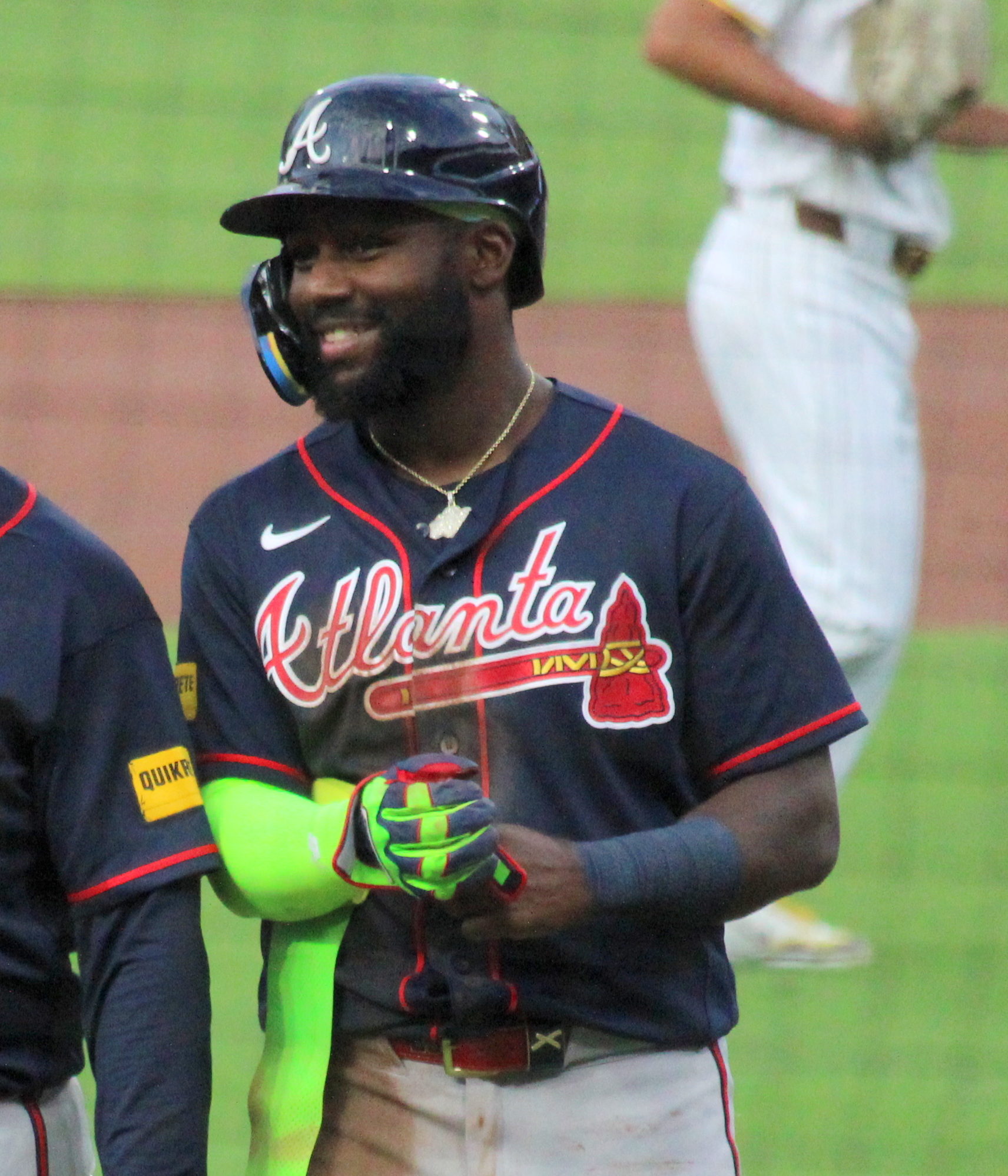
Michael Harris II's three-run home run in the 1st inning helped Atlanta win the series and send the Braves the NLDS.

October 1, 2026 8:15 pm (EDT) at Truist Park in Cumberland, Georgia 81 °F (27 °C), Mostly Clear
Team	1	2	3	4	5	6	7	8	9	R	H	E
Philadelphia	0	0	0	0	0	1	0	1	0	2	6	0
Atlanta	3	0	0	2	0	0	1	0	X	6	6	0
WP: Grant Holmes (1–0) LP: Aaron Nola (0–1); Home runs: PHI: None; ATL: Michael Harris II (1), Ozzie Albies (1), Matt Olson (1); Attendance: 41,731; Boxscore

Michael Harris II opened the scoring in the bottom of the first inning with a three-run home run off Aaron Nola, giving the Braves an early 3–0 lead. Nola's outing was cut short as he pitched just 1 2/3 innings, surrendering two hits and three runs while walking two and striking out one.

Braves starter Ray Kerr, who tossed 3 1/3 scoreless innings, allowed only one hit, one walk, and struck out two. In the bottom of the fourth, Ozzie Albies extended the Braves' lead to 5–0 by launching a two-run home run off new reliever Zach Wheeler.

The Phillies broke through in the top of the sixth when Alec Bohm's groundout scored Kyle Schwarber cutting the deficit to 5–1. Wheeler ultimately pitched four innings, giving up three hits, two runs, and three walks while striking out three batters.

The Braves answered in the bottom of the seventh when Matt Olson hit a solo home run off Jonathan Bowlan, pushing the lead back out to 6–1. The Phillies responded in the top of the eighth when Derek Hill led off with a triple and subsequently scored on a Trea Turner sacrifice fly, narrowing the score to 6–2.

Braves ace Chris Sale then took the mound in the top of the eighth, pitching 1 1/3 dominant innings to close out the game and send Atlanta into the NLDS. There, they will face the two-time defending World Champion Los Angeles Dodgers in a postseason matchup—marking the first time in four attempts that the Braves have defeated the Phillies in a postseason series.

=== Composite line score ===
2026 NLWC (2–1): Atlanta Braves beat Philadelphia Phillies

Team	1	2	3	4	5	6	7	8	9	10	R	H	E
Philadelphia Phillies	1	0	0	0	0	1	2	3	0	1	9	24	0
Atlanta Braves	3	1	0	2	0	1	3	3	0	0	14	22	0
Total attendance: 109,008 Average attendance: 36,336

== San Diego vs. Chicago ==
This is the third postseason matchup between the Chicago Cubs and San Diego Padres. The Cubs defeated the Padres in the previous year's Wild Card Series, while the Padres won the National League Championship Series in five games in 1984 after being down 2–0.

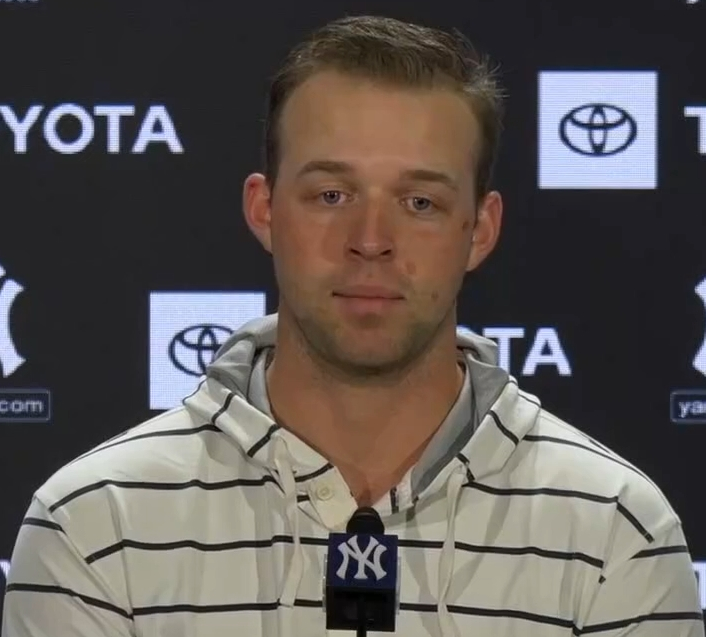
Michael King allowed one hit over seven innings.

=== Game 1 ===
September 29, 2026 7:00 pm (PDT) at Petco Park in San Diego, California 72 °F (22 °C), Clear
Team	1	2	3	4	5	6	7	8	9	R	H	E
Chicago	0	0	0	0	0	0	0	0	0	0	3	1
San Diego	2	0	1	1	3	0	1	0	X	8	13	1
WP: Michael King (1–0) LP: Matthew Boyd (0–1); Home runs: CHC: None; SD: Fernando Tatis Jr. (1), Manny Machado (1), Xander Bogaerts (1); Attendance: 47,048; Boxscore

In the bottom of the first inning, the Padres jumped out to an early lead with home runs by Fernando Tatis Jr. and Manny Machado. Machado added an RBI double in the third inning, scoring Tatis to make it 3–0, and Xander Bogaerts hit a solo home run in the fourth to extend the advantage to 4–0. Cubs starting pitcher Matthew Boyd pitched four innings, allowing five hits and four runs while striking out four batters.

The Padres further padded their lead in the bottom of the fifth. Jackson Merrill drove in two runs with a single, scoring Luis Campusano and Machado, before another run crossed the plate on a passed ball by catcher Carson Kelly that allowed Ty France to score.

Meanwhile, Padres starter Michael King put on a stellar performance, tossing seven scoreless innings while allowing just one hit and striking out eight batters. King carried a no-hitter into the seventh inning until Nico Hoerner broke it up with a base hit with two outs in the frame, marking the first time a starting pitcher took a no-hitter into the seventh inning of a postseason game since Merrill Kelly in the 2023 Wild Card Series against the Milwaukee Brewers. San Diego tacked on a final run in the seventh when another throwing error by Kelly allowed Tatis to score, making it 8–0.

Joe Musgrove pitched a scoreless ninth inning, allowing two hits and a walk with two strikeouts. It marked his first appearance since Game 2 of the 2024 Wild Card Series against the Braves on October 2, 2024, having missed time due to elbow surgery. The 8–0 shutout stood as the largest postseason shutout victory in Padres history, giving San Diego a 1–0 lead in the series.

=== Game 2 ===
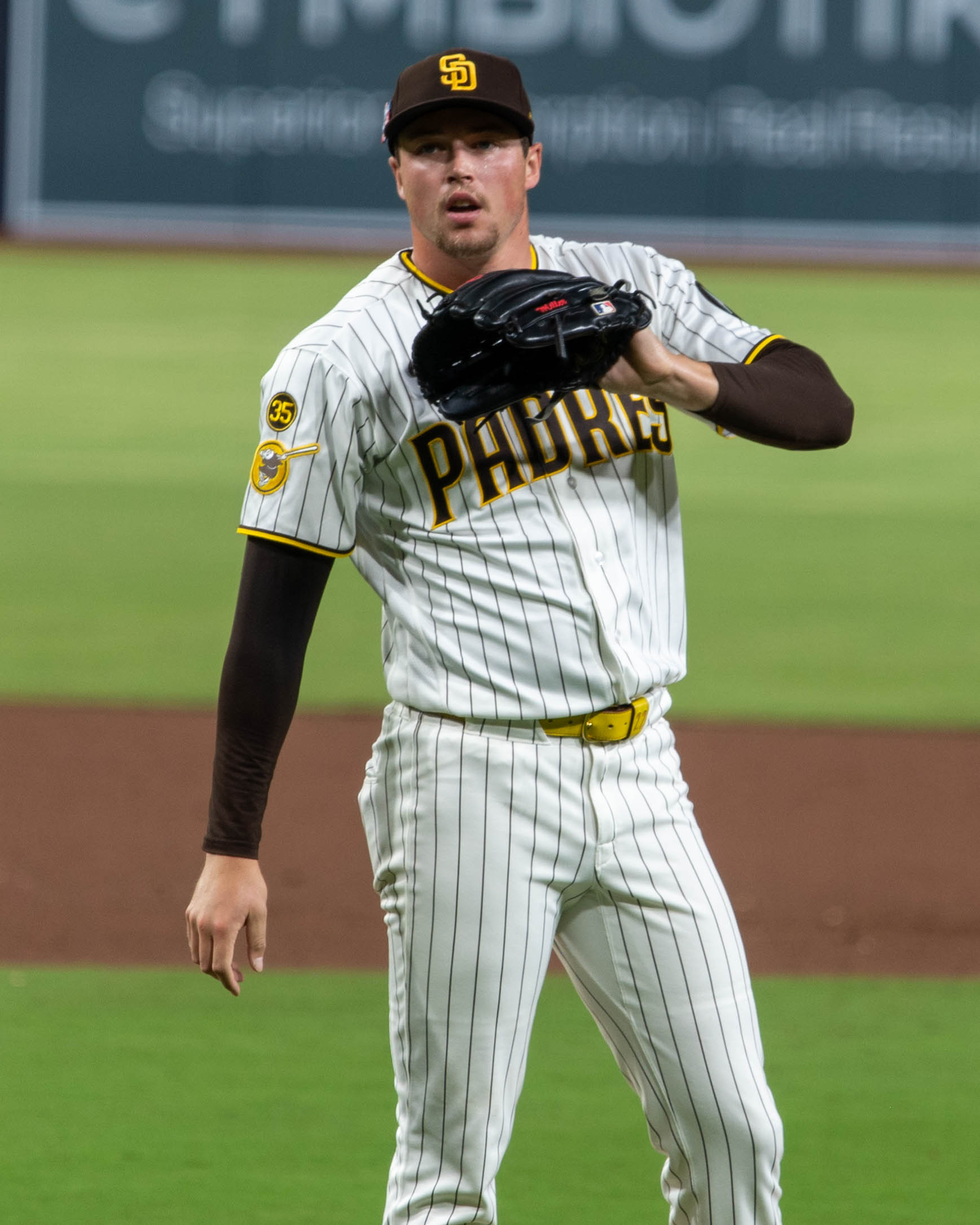
Mason Miller pitched a scoreless ninth inning to complete the Padres two-game sweep of the Cubs.

September 30, 2026 7:00 pm (PDT) at Petco Park in San Diego, California 71 °F (22 °C), Partly Cloudy
Team	1	2	3	4	5	6	7	8	9	R	H	E
Chicago	0	0	0	1	0	0	0	0	0	1	4	0
San Diego	0	2	0	2	0	0	0	0	X	4	8	0
WP: Bradgley Rodriguez (1–0) LP: Kevin Gausman (0–1) Sv: Mason Miller (1); Home runs: CHC: None; SD: Gavin Sheets (1); Attendance: 47,513; Boxscore

In the bottom of the second inning, the Padres drew first blood when a single by Xander Bogaerts plated Ty France, followed by a sacrifice fly off the bat of Ethan Salas that brought home Jackson Merrill. The Cubs answered in the top of the fourth when Nico Hoerner drove in Seiya Suzuki with an RBI single, narrowing the deficit to 2–1; however they left the bases loaded after Dansby Swanson flew out on the first pitch. Hoerner’s RBI would turn out to be the lone run for the Cubs in the series.

However, San Diego quickly pushed back in the bottom of the frame, courtesy of a two-run home run by Gavin Sheets that extended the lead to 4–1. Padres starter Nick Pivetta pitched 3 1/3 innings, yielding just one run on three hits while striking out four. On the other side, Cubs starter Kevin Gausman also went 3 1/3 innings, surrendering three runs on five hits while recording a lone strikeout. Padres closer Mason Miller pitched the ninth to close out the victory and propel the Padres to the next round with the sweep.

=== Composite line score ===
2026 NLWC (2–0): San Diego Padres beat Chicago Cubs

Team	1	2	3	4	5	6	7	8	9	R	H	E
Chicago Cubs	0	0	0	1	0	0	0	0	0	1	8	1
San Diego Padres	2	2	1	3	3	0	1	0	0	12	21	1
Total attendance: 94,597 Average attendance: 47,299

== See also ==
- 2026 American League Wild Card Series
