= Adam Beck (umpire) =

American baseball umpire (born 1988)

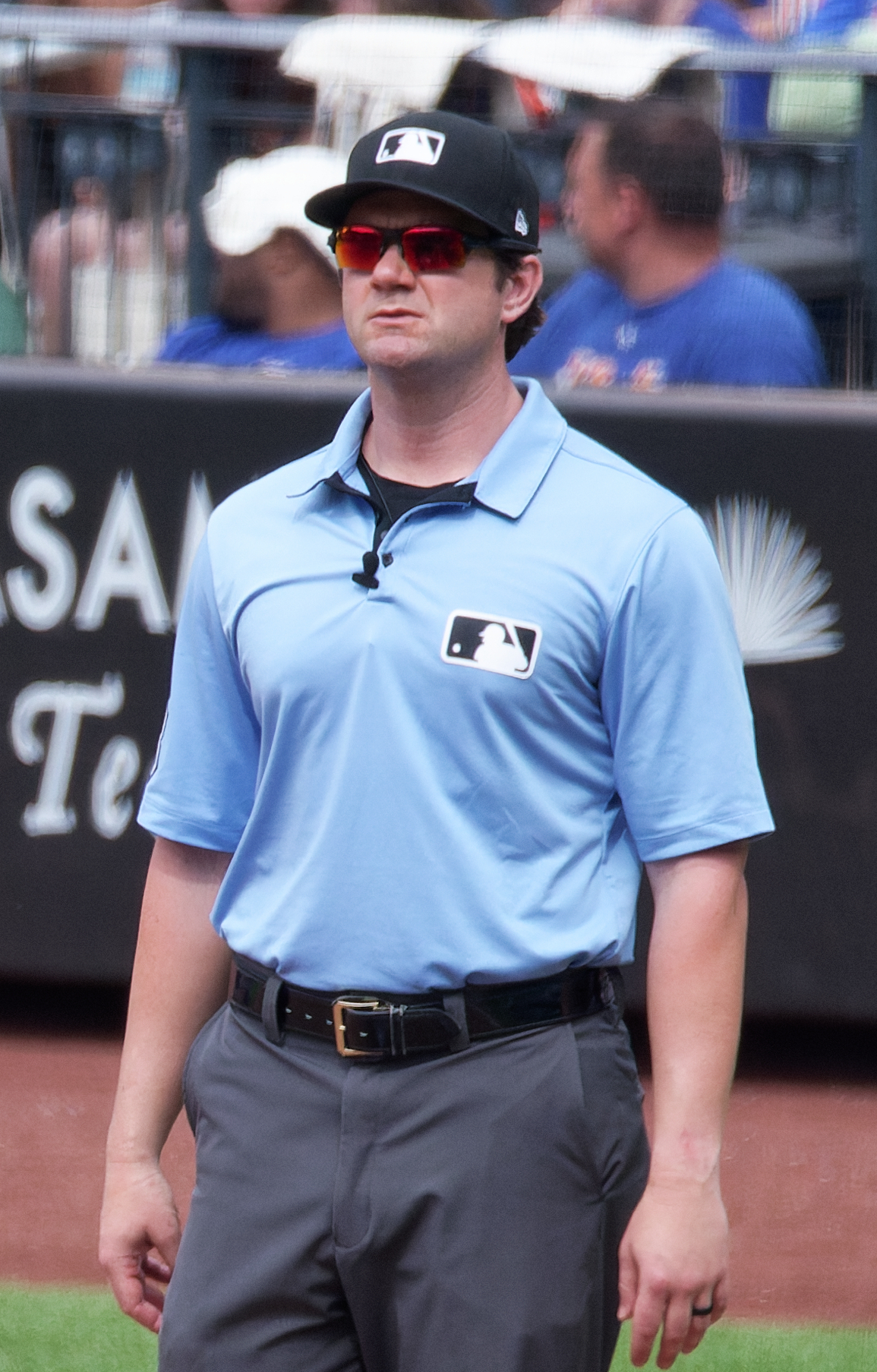
- Beck in 2024

MLB – No. 38
- Umpire
- Born: September 4, 1988 (age 38); Altamonte Springs, Florida, US

MLB debut
- August 5, 2020

Crew information
- Umpiring crew: M
- Crew members: #58 Dan Iassogna (crew chief); #54 C. B. Bucknor; #35 Jeremie Rehak; #38 Adam Beck

Career highlights and awards
- Special assignments: League Championship Series (2025); Division Series (2024); Wild Card Series (2023, 2025, 2026); All-Star Games (2026)

Adam Beck (born September 4, 1988) is an American Major League Baseball umpire. He made his first appearance at the Major League level in 2020 and was promoted to the full time umpiring staff for the 2023 season.

He wears uniform number 38.

== Career ==
Beck was introduced to professional baseball umpiring when he attended the 2012 MLB Umpire Camp in Compton, California. In 2013, he graduated from the Minor League Baseball Umpire Training Academy and was subsequently assigned to the Appalachian League. He spent time in the South Atlantic League, the Carolina League, and the Southern League before his advancement to the Triple-A International League in 2017. In the minors, Beck was assigned to the 2016 All-Star Futures Game and 2019 International League championship series. He was also an instructor at the MiLB Umpire Training Academy from 2014 to 2020 and worked the Arizona Fall League in 2018 and 2019.

On August 5, 2020, Beck made his MLB debut for the first game of a doubleheader at Citizens Bank Park between the New York Yankees and the Philadelphia Phillies. He was at third base, joining Nic Lentz at second, Will Little at first, and Angel Hernandez at home plate. Beck umpired 253 major league games before being hired full time in 2023.

On April 30, 2023, he received attention for ejecting Willy Adames and manager Craig Counsell of the Milwaukee Brewers after not granting Adames' request for a time out during a plate appearance. That fall, he worked the American League Wild Card Series between the Texas Rangers and the Tampa Bay Rays.

Beck was assigned to the 2024 American League Division Series between the Cleveland Guardians and the Detroit Tigers. He worked home plate for Game 1 of the series.

== Personal life ==
Beck currently resides in Florida and studied business management at the University of Central Florida.

== See also ==
- List of Major League Baseball umpires (disambiguation)
