= Félix Reyes =

Dominican baseball player (born 2001)

Philadelphia Phillies – No. 29
- Infielder / Outfielder
- Born: March 26, 2001 (age 25); Baní, Dominican Republic
- Bats: Right Throws: Right

MLB debut
- April 18, 2026, for the Philadelphia Phillies

MLB statistics (through 2026 season)
- Batting average: .158
- Home runs: 1
- Runs batted in: 2
- Stats at Baseball Reference

Teams
- Philadelphia Phillies (2026–present)

Félix Yomael Reyes (born March 26, 2001) is a Dominican professional baseball infielder and outfielder for the Philadelphia Phillies of Major League Baseball (MLB). He made his MLB debut in 2026.

== Career ==
Reyes signed with the Philadelphia Phillies as an international free agent on February 22, 2020. He did not play in a game in 2020 due to the cancellation of the minor league season because of the COVID-19 pandemic.

Reyes won the Eastern League batting title in 2025 while playing for the Reading Fightin Phils.

To begin the 2026 season, Reyes was assigned to the Triple-A Lehigh Valley IronPigs, slashing .333/.345/.654 in with six home runs and 15 runs batted in (RBI) in 18 games. On April 18, 2026, he was selected to the 40-man roster and promoted to the major leagues for the first time. He made his MLB debut later that day, hitting a home run in his first major league at-bat against Chris Sale of the Atlanta Braves. It would be the only home run of his rookie season, during which Reyes made 12 appearances for Philadelphia, slashing .158/.158/.263 with two RBIs in addition to his lone home run. On August 20, Reyes was placed on the 60–day injured list due to a right wrist fracture.

== See also ==
- List of Major League Baseball players with a home run in their first major league at bat
