= Alex McFarlane (baseball) =

Virgin Islander baseball player (born 2001)

Philadelphia Phillies – No. 71
- Pitcher
- Born: June 9, 2001 (age 25); Saint Thomas, U.S. Virgin Islands
- Bats: Right Throws: Right

MLB debut
- July 22, 2026, for the Philadelphia Phillies

MLB statistics (through 2026 season)
- Win–loss record: 4–1
- Earned run average: 2.84
- Strikeouts: 19
- Stats at Baseball Reference

Teams
- Philadelphia Phillies (2026–present)

Alexander Jeffrey McFarlane (born June 9, 2001) is an American professional baseball pitcher for the Philadelphia Phillies of Major League Baseball (MLB). He played college baseball for the Miami Hurricanes and was selected by the Phillies in the fourth round of the 2022 MLB draft. He made his MLB debut in 2026.

== Amateur career ==
McFarlane was born and raised in Saint Thomas, U.S. Virgin Islands, attending Virgin Islands Montessori School & Peter Gruber International Academy (VIMSIA) up through 11th grade, before moving to Cornelia, Georgia to attend Habersham Central High School. Following his senior year, he was selected in the 25th round of the 2019 Major League Baseball draft by the St. Louis Cardinals, but chose to attend the University of Miami instead. In 2021 and 2022, he played collegiate summer baseball with the Chatham Anglers of the Cape Cod Baseball League.

== Professional career ==
McFarlane was selected by the Philadelphia Phillies in the fourth round (122nd overall) of the 2022 MLB draft.

McFarlane missed the 2024 season after undergoing Tommy John surgery. He returned to action in 2025 with the High-A Jersey Shore BlueClaws and Double-A Reading Fightin Phils, pitching to a cumulative 4-9 record and 4.84 ERA with 82 strikeouts across 28 appearances (18 starts). On November 18, 2025, the Phillies added McFarlane to their 40-man roster to protect him from the Rule 5 draft.

McFarlane was optioned to Double-A Reading to begin the 2026 season. In seven appearances to start the year, he recorded a 1.42 ERA with 10 strikeouts. On April 24, 2026, the Phillies promoted McFarlane to the major leagues for the first time. He went unused out of the bullpen and was optioned back to Lehigh Valley the following day, becoming a phantom ballplayer. McFarlane was promoted again on July 20 and made his MLB debut on July 22, pitching an inning of relief for the Phillies against the Los Angeles Dodgers.

== See also ==
- List of Major League Baseball players from the United States Virgin Islands
