= Gabriel Rincones Jr. =

American baseball player (born 2001)

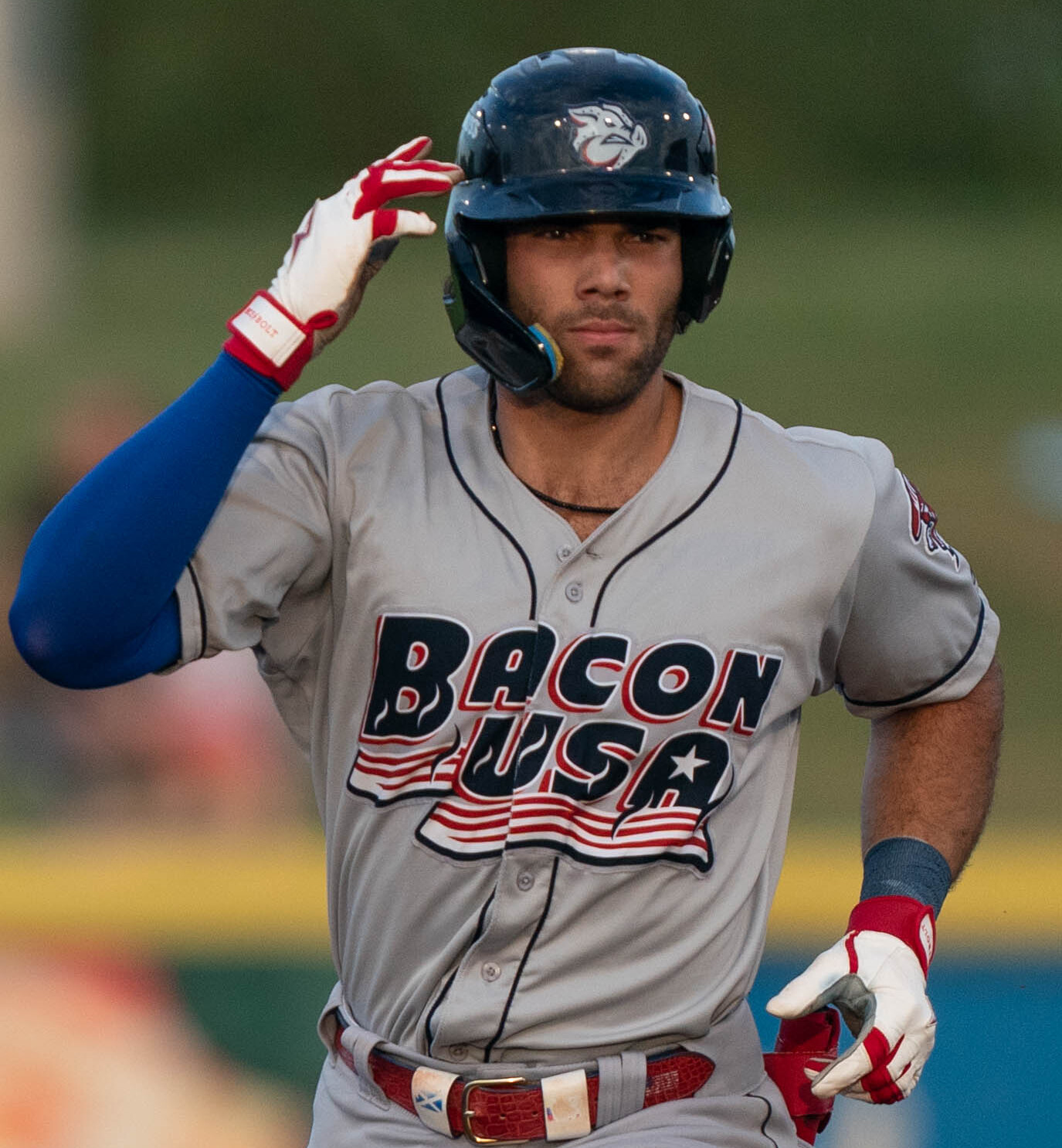
- Rincones with the Lehigh Valley IronPigs in 2026

Philadelphia Phillies – No. 17
- Outfielder
- Born: March 3, 2001 (age 25); Boynton Beach, Florida, U.S.
- Bats: Left Throws: Right

MLB debut
- June 12, 2026, for the Philadelphia Phillies

MLB statistics (through 2026 season)
- Batting average: .167
- Home runs: 2
- Runs batted in: 7
- Stats at Baseball Reference

Teams
- Philadelphia Phillies (2026)

Gabriel Alejandro Rincones Jr. (born March 3, 2001) is an American professional baseball outfielder for the Philadelphia Phillies of Major League Baseball (MLB). He made his Major League Baseball (MLB) debut in 2026.

== Early life and amateur career ==
Rincones was born March 3, 2001, in Boynton Beach, Florida, and he grew up playing baseball in Venezuela. When Rincones was six years old, his family moved to Glenrothes for his father's job. Although he picked up swimming and judo in Scotland, Rincones had no opportunity to play baseball there, and he returned to North America when he was 12 years old. After staying with family in Venezuela, Rincones moved in with his aunt in Florida. Because he had not played baseball in Scotland, Rincones struggled to keep up with his teammates at Henry B. Plant High School, and was cut from the team in his first two seasons.

He played junior college baseball at St. Petersburg College. As a freshman, he batted .432 with 11 doubles, four home runs and 28 RBI. Rincones was named the Florida State College Activities Association (FCSAA) Player of the Year after hitting for a .415 average with 19 doubles, six home runs, and 43 RBI during his sophomore season. He also committed to transfer to Florida Atlantic University (FAU) for his remaining eligibility. Rincones drafted by the San Diego Padres in the 19th round of the 2021 Major League Baseball draft, but opted not to sign with the team. In his only season playing for the FAU Owls, Rincones batted .346 with 19 home runs and 69 RBI and was named the Conference USA Newcomer of the Year.

== Professional career ==
=== Draft and minor leagues (2022–2026) ===
Rincones was selected in the third round of the 2022 Major League Baseball draft by the Philadelphia Phillies. He made his professional debut in 2023 for the Single-A Clearwater Threshers, before being promoted to the High-A Jersey Shore BlueClaws on June 12. Rincones opened the 2024 season with the Double-A Reading Fightin Phils. He posted a .300/.417/.600 slash line across 60 plate appearances with the team before landing on the injured list due a right thumb ligament tear on April 24. After a late season return, Rincones finished the season with a .263/.357/.487 slash line at the Double-A level. He was then sent to the Glendale Desert Dogs of the Arizona Fall League following the season.

Rincones made 119 appearances for the Triple-A Lehigh Valley IronPigs in 2025, batting .240/.370/.430 with 18 home runs, 73 RBI, and 21 stolen bases. On November 18, 2025, the Phillies added Rincones to their 40-man roster to protect him from the Rule 5 draft.

Rincones was optioned to Triple-A Lehigh Valley to begin the 2026 season. In his first 12 appearances for the club, he batted .239/.345/.283 with five RBI and two stolen bases.

=== Major leagues (2026–present) ===
On June 12, 2026, Rincones was promoted to the major leagues for the first time following an injury to Adolis García. On June 15, Rincones recorded his first career hit (which was a home run) off of Ryan Gusto of the Miami Marlins.

== International career ==
Rincones has represented the Great Britain national baseball team in international competition. Competing with the team during the 2021 European Baseball Championship, Rincones played in six games, hitting .259 with three doubles and four RBI.
