= Alan Rangel =

Mexican baseball player (born 1997)

Philadelphia Phillies – No. 57
- Pitcher
- Born: August 21, 1997 (age 29); Hermosillo, Mexico
- Bats: Right Throws: Right

MLB debut
- June 6, 2025, for the Philadelphia Phillies

MLB statistics (through 2026 season)
- Win–loss record: 0–3
- Earned run average: 4.86
- Strikeouts: 37
- Stats at Baseball Reference

Teams
- Philadelphia Phillies (2025–present)
Medals
Men's baseball
Representing Mexico
World Baseball Classic
Bronze medal – third place	2023 Miami	Team

Alan Eduardo Rangel (born August 21, 1997) is a Mexican professional baseball pitcher for the Philadelphia Phillies of Major League Baseball (MLB). He signed with Atlanta Braves as an international free agent in 2014 and made his MLB debut in 2025 with the Phillies.

== Career ==
=== Atlanta Braves ===
On July 2, 2014, Rangel signed with the Atlanta Braves as an international free agent. He made his professional debut with the rookie-level Gulf Coast Braves in 2015, and spent the next two seasons with them. In 26 combined games, he recorded a 4.35 ERA with 51 strikeouts in 42 2/3 innings of work.

Rangel spent the 2017 season with the Single-A Rome Braves, making 15 appearances (13 starts) and logging a 4.71 ERA with 48 strikeouts in 70 2/3 innings pitched. Rangel returned to Rome in 2018, making 25 appearances (22 starts) and registering a 5–7 record and 4.09 ERA with 105 strikeouts in 125 1/33 innings of work. He spent a third straight season in Rome in 2019, pitching in 28 games (24 starts) and posting a 10–7 record and 4.51 ERA with 121 strikeouts in 131 2/3 innings of work.

Rangel did not play in a game in 2020 due to the cancellation of the minor league season because of the COVID-19 pandemic. Rangel split the 2021 season between the Double-A Mississippi Braves and Rome, posting a cumulative 7–7 record and 3.87 ERA with 136 strikeouts in 104 2/3 innings pitched across 22 games (21 starts).

On November 6, 2021, the Braves added Rangel to their 40-man roster to protect him from the Rule 5 draft. He was optioned to the Triple-A Gwinnett Stripers to begin the 2022 season. He pitched in only one game for Gwinnett before being demoted to the Double-A Mississippi Braves. In 26 starts for Mississippi, Rangel registered a 5–8 record and 5.26 ERA with 139 strikeouts in 114 2/3 innings pitched. On September 24, 2022, Rangel was promoted to the major leagues for the first time after Spencer Strider was placed on the injured list. He went unused out of the bullpen and was optioned to Triple-A Gwinnett on September 27, becoming a phantom ballplayer. On November 18, Rangel was non-tendered by the Braves and became a free agent.

Rangel re-signed with the Braves on a minor league contract on November 29, 2022. He was assigned to Double-A Mississippi to begin the 2023 season. In 26 games split between Mississippi and Gwinnett, Rangel accumulated 4–16 record and 4.61 ERA with 140 strikeouts across 127.0 innings of work. He elected free agency following the season on November 6.

=== Los Angeles Angels ===
On November 21, 2023, Rangel signed a minor league contract with the Los Angeles Angels. He made 7 starts split between the rookie–level Arizona Complex League Angels and Double–A Rocket City Trash Pandas, accumulating a 2–0 record and 3.46 ERA with 33 strikeouts. Rangel was released by the Angels organization on July 1, 2024.

=== Philadelphia Phillies ===
On July 16, 2024, Rangel signed a minor league contract with the Philadelphia Phillies organization. In 10 appearances for the Triple–A Lehigh Valley IronPigs, he compiled a 1–2 record and 4.30 ERA with 25 strikeouts across 29 1/3 innings pitched. On November 4, the Phillies selected Rangel's contract, adding him to their 40–man roster.

Rangel was optioned to Triple-A Lehigh Valley to begin the 2025 season. In 12 starts, he logged a 4–0 record and 5.02 ERA with 64 strikeouts across 57 1/3 innings pitched. On June 6, 2025, the Phillies promoted Rangel to the major leagues for a second time. He made his MLB debut the same day against the Pittsburgh Pirates. On June 27, Rangel recorded his first career save after tossing five scoreless innings against the Atlanta Braves. He made five appearances during his rookie campaign, recording a 2.45 ERA with eight strikeouts across 11 innings pitched.

Rangel was optioned to Triple-A Lehigh Valley to begin the 2026 season.

== International career ==
Rangel played for Team México at the 2023 World Baseball Classic.
