= Otto Kemp =

American baseball player (born 1999)

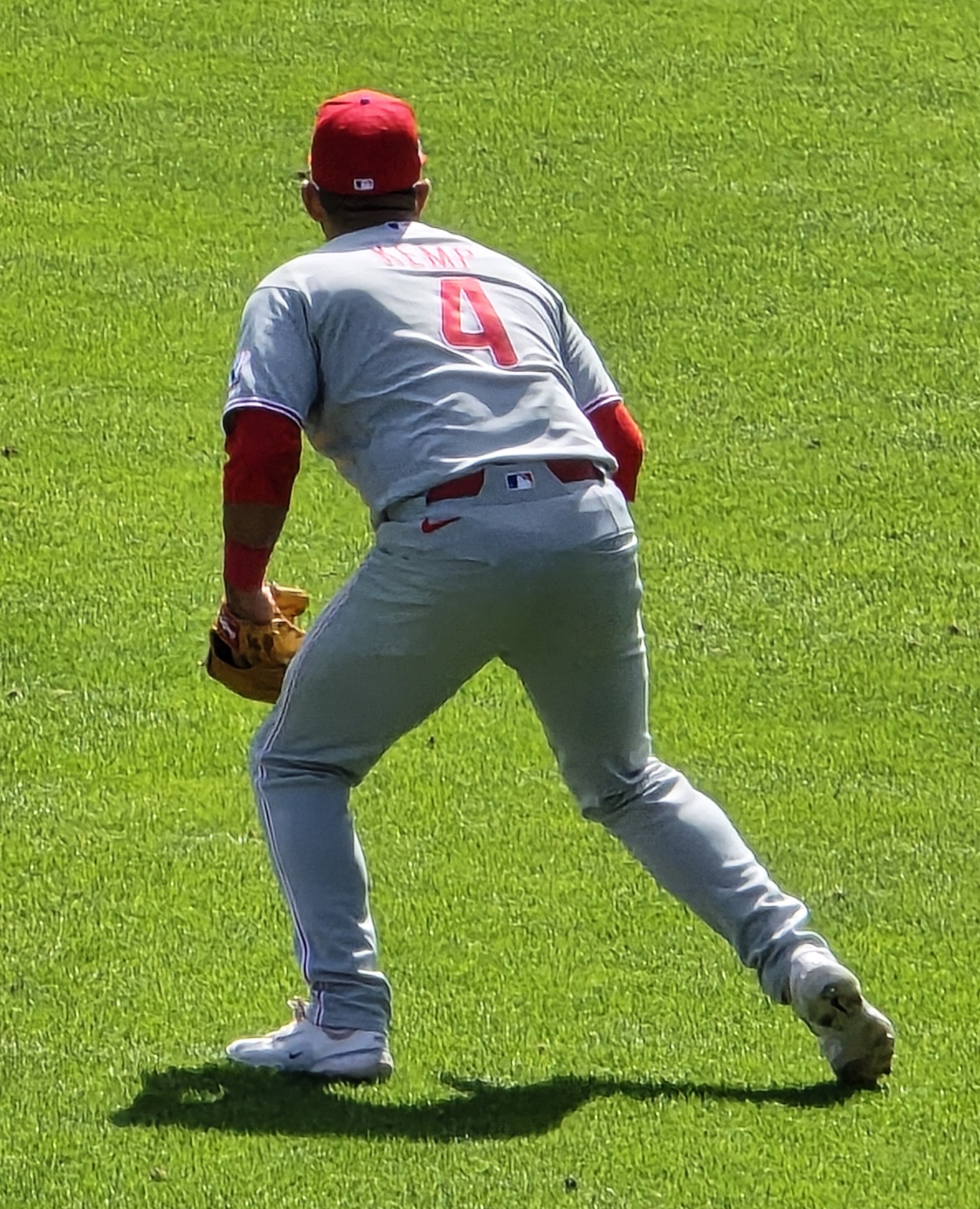
- Kemp with the Philadelphia Phillies in 2026

Philadelphia Phillies – No. 31
- Infielder / Outfielder
- Born: September 9, 1999 (age 27); Fullerton, California, U.S.
- Bats: Right Throws: Right

MLB debut
- June 7, 2025, for the Philadelphia Phillies

MLB statistics (through 2026 season)
- Batting average: .216
- Home runs: 8
- Runs batted in: 28
- Stats at Baseball Reference

Teams
- Philadelphia Phillies (2025–present)

Otto Severson Kemp (born September 9, 1999) is an American professional baseball utility player for the Philadelphia Phillies of Major League Baseball (MLB). He made his MLB debut in 2025.

== Career ==
Kemp attended Troy High School in Fullerton, California and played college baseball at Point Loma Nazarene University. During the summer of 2021, he played for the St. Cloud Rox of the Northwoods League, setting a then-record of 58 runs scored in a season, making the 2021 All-Star Game, and contributing to the Rox making the championship game. Kemp signed with the Philadelphia Phillies as an undrafted free agent in 2022.

Kemp spent his first professional season with the rookie-level Florida Complex League Phillies and Single-A Clearwater Threshers. He played 2023 with Clearwater and the High-A Jersey Shore BlueClaws and 2024 with Clearwater, Jersey Shore, the Double-A Reading Fightin Phils and Triple-A Lehigh Valley IronPigs. After the 2024 season he played in the Arizona Fall League for the Glendale Desert Dogs. Returning to Triple-A to start the 2025 season, Kemp was named the International League Player of the Month for April, slashing .330/.421/.711 during the month.

On June 7, 2025, Kemp was selected to the 40-man roster and promoted to the major leagues for the first time, replacing an injured Bryce Harper, and debuted at third base. He was the first undrafted position player to debut with the Phillies since Jeff Grotewold in 1992. On June 9, Kemp recorded his first career hit when hit a single into left field off of pitcher Matthew Boyd in the bottom of the fifth inning. In the same game, Kemp recorded his first multi-hit game with three hits by going 3-for-5 in a Phillies 4-3 victory in extra innings over the Chicago Cubs. On June 27, Kemp recorded his first career home run, a three-run shot off Atlanta Braves starter Bryce Elder in the top of the third inning. He made 62 appearances for Philadelphia during his rookie campaign, batting .234/.298/.411 with eight home runs, 28 RBI, and two stolen bases. On October 17, it was announced that Kemp would require surgeries to repair a fractured kneecap and some damage in his left shoulder.

In 2026, Kemp batted .080/.148/.228 for the Phillies in 25 at bats, without any runs, home runs, or RBIs, playing primarily left field, with one inning at second base.

== Personal life ==
Kemp's parents are Rob and Diane. He has three siblings, including an older sister who is a life coach. His elder brother Sam also attended and played baseball at Troy. Kemp's wife is Lily Kemp.
