= Andrew Painter (baseball) =

American baseball player (born 2003)

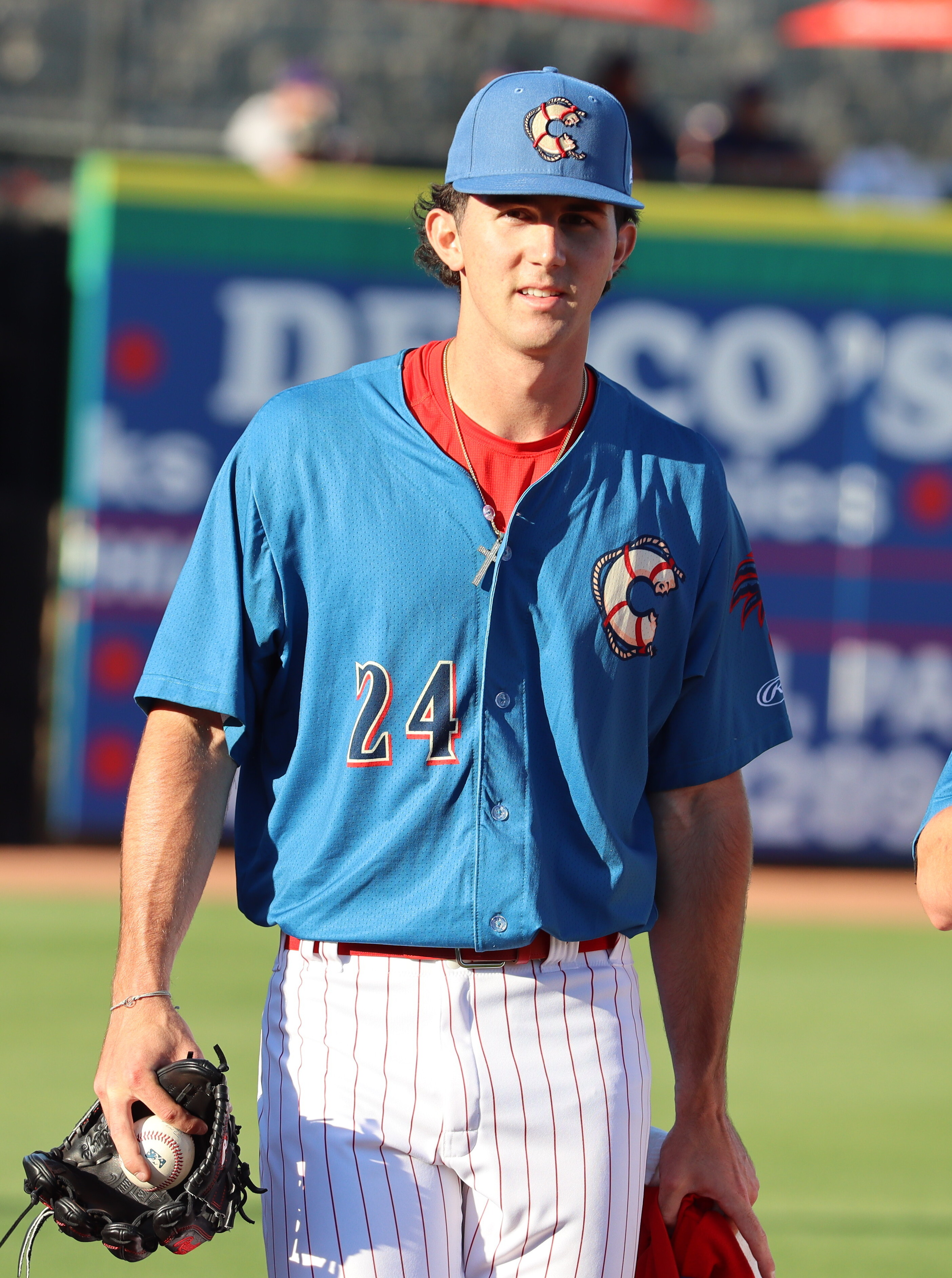
- Painter in 2022 with the Clearwater Threshers

Philadelphia Phillies – No. 24
- Pitcher
- Born: April 10, 2003 (age 23); Pompano Beach, Florida, U.S.
- Bats: Right Throws: Right

MLB debut
- March 31, 2026, for the Philadelphia Phillies

MLB statistics (through 2026 season)
- Win–loss record: 3–10
- Earned run average: 5.40
- Strikeouts: 115
- Stats at Baseball Reference

Teams
- Philadelphia Phillies (2026–present)
Medals
Men's baseball
Representing United States
U-15 Baseball World Cup
Gold medal – first place	2018 Panama	Team

Andrew Patrick Painter (born April 10, 2003) is an American professional baseball pitcher for the Philadelphia Phillies of Major League Baseball (MLB). He made his MLB debut in 2026.

== Amateur career ==
Painter attended Calvary Christian Academy in Fort Lauderdale, Florida. He committed to the University of Florida during his freshman year in 2018. The summer after his freshman year, he played for the USA Baseball 15U National Team in Panama where he earned a Gold Medal and was named to the All-World team. As a sophomore in 2019, he went 7–2 with a 1.43 ERA over 53 2/3 innings, leading Calvary Christian to the 4A state championship game. That summer, he was named to the Under Armour All-America Baseball Game at Wrigley Field, being one of two juniors selected. In 2020, his junior year, he gave up one run and struck out 33 batters over 15 innings before the season was canceled due to the COVID-19 pandemic. Painter finished his senior season in 2021 with a 6–1 record and a 0.38 ERA while striking out 93 batters over 47 innings. He was named the 2021 Florida Gatorade Player of the Year.

== Professional career ==
The Philadelphia Phillies selected Painter in the first round, with the 13th overall selection, of the 2021 Major League Baseball draft. He signed with the Phillies for a bonus of $3.9 million. He made his professional debut with the Rookie-level Florida Complex League Phillies with whom he threw six scoreless innings with 12 strikeouts for the season.

Painter opened the 2022 season with the Clearwater Threshers of the Single-A Florida State League. After nine starts in which he went 1–1 with a 1.40 ERA, 69 strikeouts, and 16 walks over 38 2/3 innings, he was promoted to the Jersey Shore BlueClaws of the High-A South Atlantic League in early June. On August 14, he was promoted to the Reading Fightin Phils of the Double-A Eastern League after starting eight games and posting a 0.98 ERA with 49 strikeouts over 36 2/3 innings with the BlueClaws. Over five starts with Reading, he went 2–1 with a 2.54 ERA and 37 strikeouts over 28 1/3 innings. He finished the 2022 season with a combined 6–2 record, 1.56 ERA, 0.887 WHIP, and 155 strikeouts over 103 2/3 innings between the three teams. The Phillies named him their Minor League Player of the Year.

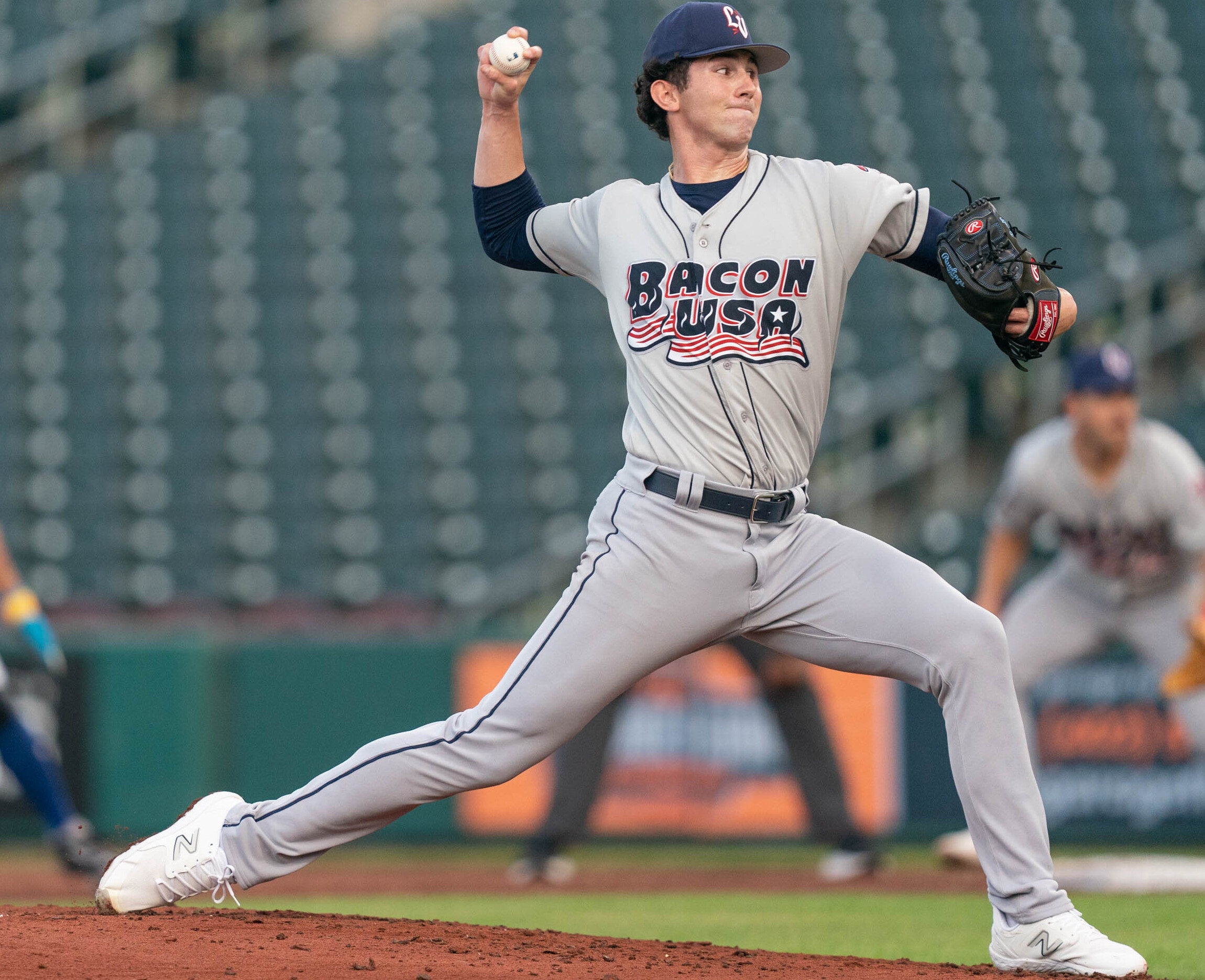
Painter with the Lehigh Valley IronPigs in 2025

Entering the 2023 season, Painter was a consensus top 15 prospect in baseball. However, on March 10, he was shut down after being diagnosed with a proximal ulnar collateral ligament sprain in his right elbow. On July 25, Painter underwent Tommy John surgery in Los Angeles, never having pitched in a competitive game in 2023.

Painter did not play a minor league game in 2024 while recovering from surgery, but did play with the Glendale Desert Dogs of the Arizona Fall League, being named the league's pitcher of the year award.

Painter returned to Clearwater for the first month of the 2025 season, and was then promoted to the Lehigh Valley IronPigs of the Triple-A International League. He was selected to represent the Phillies at the 2025 All-Star Futures Game at Truist Park. Over 26 starts for the season, Painter went 5-8 with a 5.26 ERA and 123 strikeouts over 118 innings. On November 18, 2025, the Phillies added Painter to their 40-man roster to protect him from the Rule 5 draft.

On March 20, 2026, the Phillies announced that Painter had made their Opening Day roster. He made his debut on March 31 against the Washington Nationals, striking out eight batters in 5 1/3 innings en route to his first career victory. However, following his debut, Painter would struggle, posting a record of 0–8 with an ERA of 7.54. On June 17, 2026, Painter was optioned back down to Triple-A. He was recalled from Triple-A by the Phillies on July 31, 2026.

In his postseason debut on Sept. 30, 2026, Painter pitched three scoreless innings in a win-or-go-home game 2 of the NL Wild Card Series against the Atlanta Braves, closing out an extra-inning 4-3 win to keep the Phillies' 2026 season alive. Commentator and former Philly John Kruk called Painter the game's MVP.
