= Jesús Luzardo =

American baseball player (born 1997)

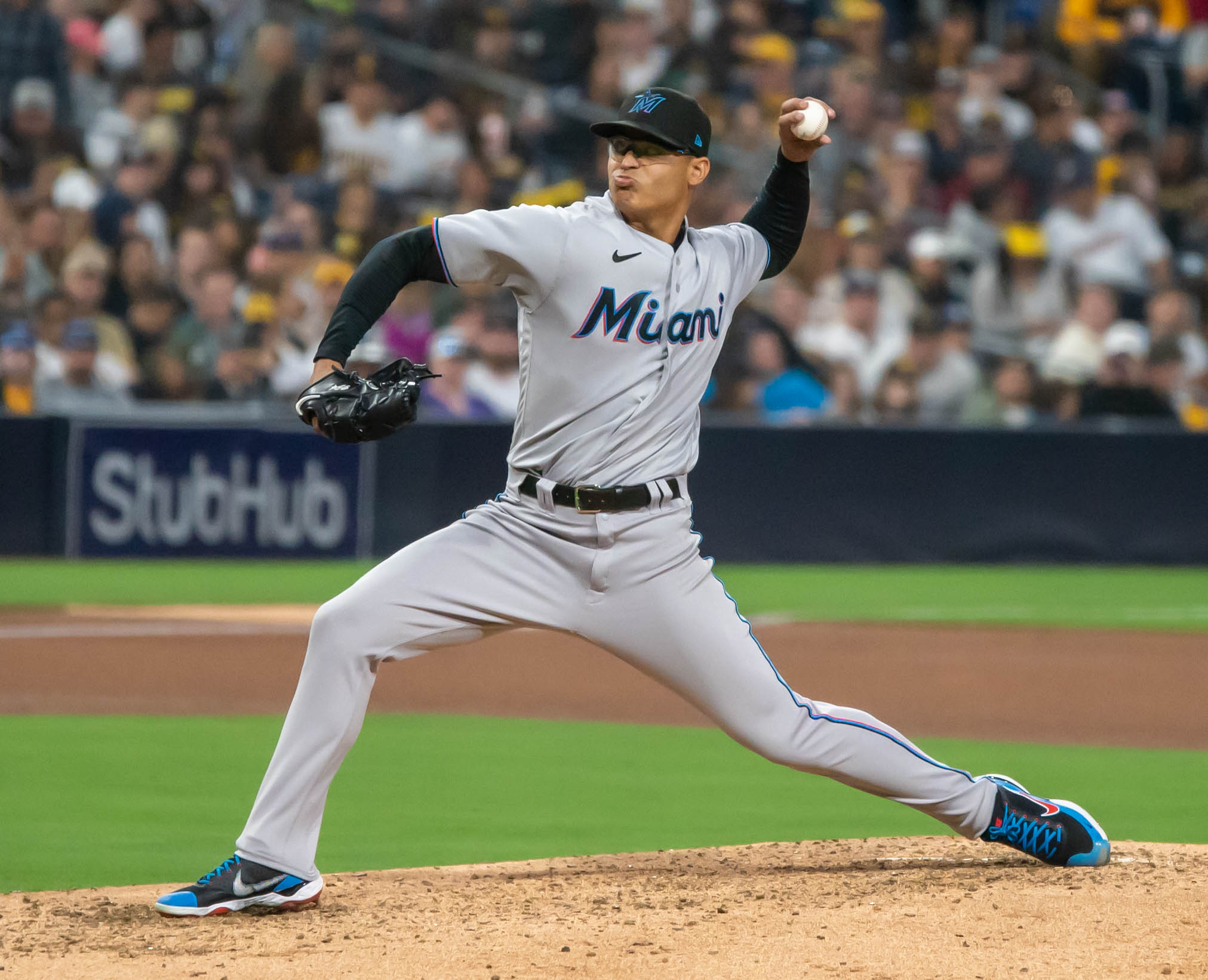
- Luzardo with the Marlins in 2022

Philadelphia Phillies – No. 44
- Pitcher
- Born: September 30, 1997 (age 29); Lima, Peru
- Bats: Left Throws: Left

MLB debut
- September 11, 2019, for the Oakland Athletics

MLB statistics (through 2026 season)
- Win–loss record: 55–45
- Earned run average: 3.93
- Strikeouts: 996
- Stats at Baseball Reference

Teams
- Oakland Athletics (2019–2021); Miami Marlins (2021–2024); Philadelphia Phillies (2025–present)

Career highlights and awards
- All-Star (2026)

Jesús Guillermo Luzardo (born September 30, 1997) is a Peruvian-born Venezuelan-American professional baseball pitcher for the Philadelphia Phillies of Major League Baseball (MLB). He has previously played in MLB for the Oakland Athletics and Miami Marlins. He made his MLB debut in 2019. Luzardo represented the Venezuelan national baseball team in the 2023 World Baseball Classic. Luzardo was named to his first All-Star game in 2026.

== Early life ==
Luzardo was born on September 30, 1997, to Venezuelan parents in Lima, Perú. The family relocated to South Florida when Luzardo was one or two years old (sources differ). He attended Marjory Stoneman Douglas High School in Parkland, Florida, graduating in 2016.

== Professional career ==
=== Washington Nationals ===
The Washington Nationals selected Luzardo in the third round of the 2016 Major League Baseball draft, making him the first Peru-born player drafted by an MLB team since at least 1990.

Luzardo had torn his ulnar collateral ligament in his pitching arm and had undergone Tommy John surgery, performed by Dr. James Andrews, in March 2016. Prior to the injury, Luzardo had been projected as a first round pick. The Nationals, who drafted him in the third round, were known for taking chances on players who had already undergone or needed to have Tommy John surgery, and committed to completing his rehabilitation. Luzardo forwent a commitment to the University of Miami to sign with the organization. Luzardo made his professional debut on June 28, 2017, with the GCL Nationals against the GCL Marlins, reportedly hitting 98 miles per hour (158 km/h) with his fastball.

=== Oakland Athletics ===
The Nationals traded Luzardo, Sheldon Neuse, and Blake Treinen to the Oakland Athletics on July 16, 2017, for Sean Doolittle and Ryan Madson. After joining Oakland, he played for the Arizona League Athletics and the Vermont Lake Monsters. In 12 total games between the Nationals, Athletics, and Lake Monsters, he posted a 2–1 record with a 1.66 ERA with 48 strikeouts in 43 1/3 innings.

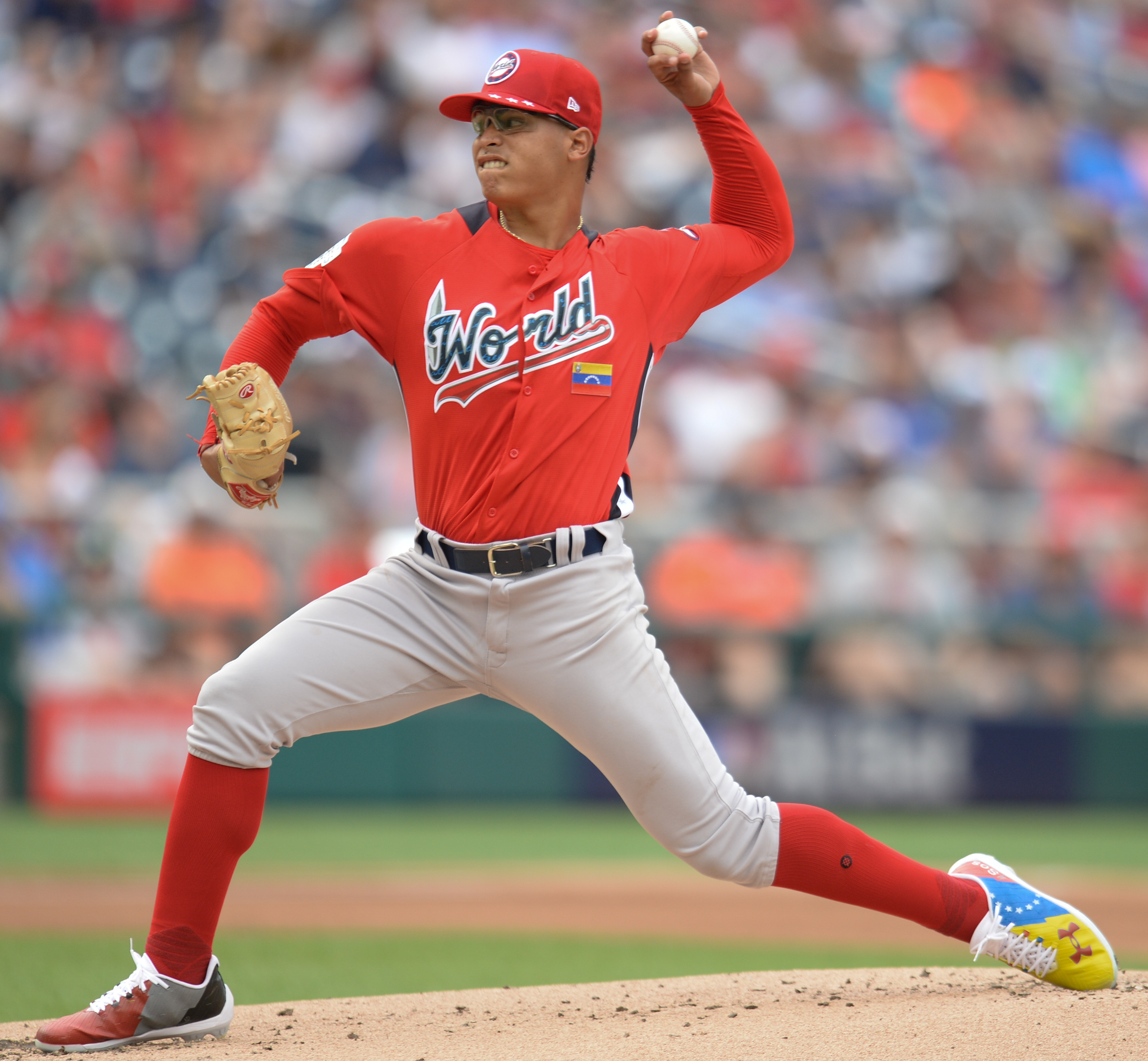
Luzardo at the 2018 All-Star Futures Game

Luzardo was ranked among the top prospects in the minor leagues prior to 2018. He started the season with the Stockton Ports and was promoted to the Double-A Midland RockHounds early on in the season. He made his Triple-A debut with the Nashville Sounds on August 6. Across three levels in 2018, Luzardo combined for a 10–5 record with a 2.88 ERA and 129 strikeouts. His performance was recognized by being named to the Texas League's mid and post-season All-Star teams and being selected to participate in the All-Star Futures Game.

Entering 2019, Luzardo was in competition for a spot on the A's Opening Day roster. In 9 2/3 innings over 4 spring starts, he held batters to 2 hits and 4 walks while striking out 15. A strained left rotator cuff late in spring training resulted in him being shut down and missing the start of the season. On June 11, 2019, Luzardo returned to the mound with Class A-Advanced Stockton, and allowed one run over seven innings spanning two outings with 11 strikeouts before being promoted to the Triple-A Las Vegas Aviators. Unfortunately, he exited his third outing in Las Vegas with a lat strain, putting his plans to join the A's rotation on hold.

On September 9, 2019, the Athletics selected Luzardo's contract and promoted him to the major leagues for the first time. He made his debut on September 11 versus the Houston Astros, pitching three innings in relief. Luzardo thus became the first Peruvian-born player in major league history. He appeared in 6 games in September for Oakland.

On July 7, 2020, it was announced that Luzardo had tested positive for COVID-19. The diagnosis forced the A's to put Luzardo in the bullpen to begin the season, but he only needed two relief appearances before making his first big league start on August 4 against the Texas Rangers. Luzardo got his first big league win in his next start on August 9 against the Houston Astros. He finished the season with a record of 3–2 and an ERA of 4.12 in 12 games (9 starts).

Luzardo began the 2021 season in the A's rotation, but struggled to a 5.79 ERA over six starts before requiring time on the injured list, after accidentally slamming his throwing hand on a table while playing a video game, resulting in a fractured pinky. By the time he returned to the team on May 30, James Kaprielian had claimed his place in the rotation, and Luzardo was used out of the bullpen. He began his tenure with four scoreless innings, but allowed six home runs in his next five outings before being optioned to Triple-A Las Vegas on June 21.

=== Miami Marlins ===
On July 28, 2021, the Athletics traded Luzardo to the Miami Marlins in exchange for Starling Marte and cash considerations. He made 12 starts for the Marlins down the stretch, working to a 4–5 record and 6.44 ERA with 58 strikeouts in 57 1/3 innings pitched.

On May 15, 2022, Luzardo was placed on the injured list with a left forearm strain, and was transferred to the 60-day IL on June 15. He was activated on August 1. Luzardo made 18 total starts for the Marlins in 2022, compiling a 4–7 record and 3.32 ERA with 120 strikeouts over 100 1/3 innings of work.

Luzardo's 2023 salary was set by the arbitration process at $2.45 million. He made 32 starts for Miami in 2023, registering a 10–10 record and 3.58 ERA with 208 strikeouts across 178 2/3 innings pitched.

Luzardo began the 2024 season in Miami's rotation, posting a 3–6 record and 5.00 ERA across 12 starts. He was placed on the injured list with a lumbar stress reaction on June 22, 2024, and was transferred to the 60–day injured list the next day. On August 8, Luzardo announced that he would miss the remainder of the season as a result of the injury.

=== Philadelphia Phillies ===
On December 22, 2024, the Marlins traded Luzardo and Paul McIntosh to the Philadelphia Phillies in exchange for prospects Starlyn Caba and Emaarion Boyd. Luzardo made 32 starts for Philadelphia during the 2025 campaign, compiling a 15–7 record and 3.92 ERA with 216 strikeouts across 183 2/3 innings pitched.

On March 10, 2026, Luzardo and the Phillies agreed to a five-year, $135 million contract extension. In the 2026 season, Luzardo was named an All-Star for the first time in his career, replacing Miami Marlins starter Max Meyer. In August, he was named National League Pitcher of the Month after pitching to a 1.31 ERA for the month. On September 7, Luzardo pitched a two-hit, 1–0 shutout of the Atlanta Braves, which was also the first complete game of his career.

== Personal life ==
During the offseason of 2018, Luzardo helped coach at his former high school, Marjory Stoneman Douglas High School in Parkland, Florida. On February 14 of that year, he had planned to be at the school at 2:40 P.M. for a practice, but was running late. At approximately 2:20 P.M., a former student opened fire at the school—before Luzardo had arrived, he received a text from his former coach advising him not to come to the school. Following the shooting, Luzardo set up a fundraiser, which raised over $10,000 for the family of his late Athletic Director, Chris Hixon, who was killed in the shooting.

For the 2025 season, Luzardo, through his family foundation, donates $100 for each strikeout he records to support youth programs in Philadelphia, as part of his 'Striking Out Barriers' initiative. The funds benefit the Boys & Girls Clubs of Philadelphia, helping develop educational opportunities for local children.

Awards and achievements
Preceded by Chris Sale	National League Pitcher of the Month; August 2026	Succeeded by Jared Jones
