= Cristopher Sánchez =

Dominican baseball player (born 1996)

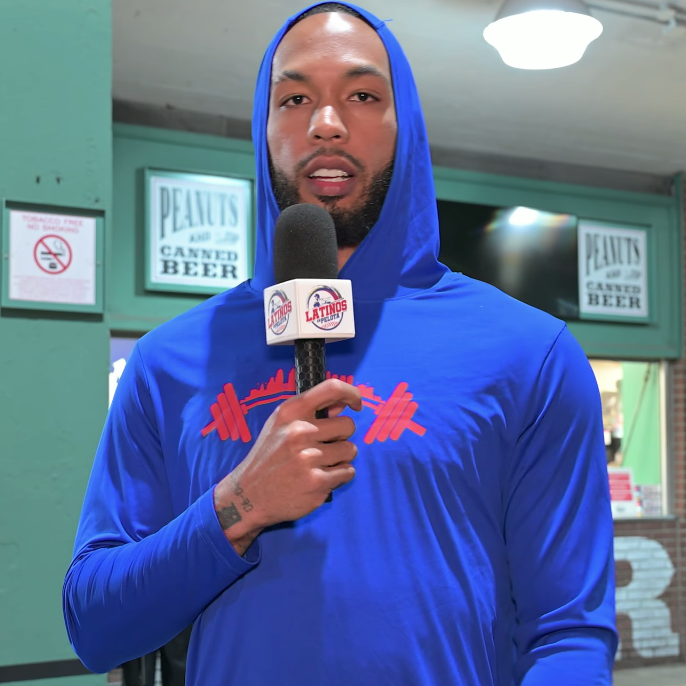
- Sánchez in 2026

Philadelphia Phillies – No. 61
- Pitcher
- Born: December 12, 1996 (age 29); La Romana, Dominican Republic
- Bats: Left Throws: Left

MLB debut
- June 6, 2021, for the Philadelphia Phillies

MLB statistics (through 2026 season)
- Win–loss record: 48–28
- Earned run average: 3.15
- Strikeouts: 740
- Stats at Baseball Reference

Teams
- Philadelphia Phillies (2021–present)

Career highlights and awards
- 2× All-Star (2024, 2026); All-MLB First Team (2026); NL wins leader (2026)
Medals
Men's baseball
Representing Dominican Republic
World Baseball Classic
Bronze medal – third place	2026 Miami	Team

Cristopher Alexis Sánchez (born December 12, 1996) is a Dominican professional baseball pitcher for the Philadelphia Phillies of Major League Baseball (MLB). He made his MLB debut in 2021 and was named an All-Star in 2024 and 2026. In 2026, Sánchez pitched for 50 2/3 consecutive scoreless innings, setting the 5th-longest streak all time in MLB history and the longest for a left-handed pitcher.

== Career ==
=== Tampa Bay Rays ===
Sánchez signed with the Tampa Bay Rays as an international free agent at the age of 16 on July 15, 2013, for a $65,000 signing bonus. He spent the 2014, 2015, and 2016 seasons with the DSL Rays. Sánchez went 1–3 with a 7.77 ERA over 22 innings in 2014, 2–1 with a 3.54 ERA over 20 1/3 innings in 2015, and 5–3 with a 3.06 ERA over 61 2/3 innings in 2016. He spent the 2017 season with the Princeton Rays, going 1–6 with a 10.01 ERA over 38 2/3 innings. Sánchez split the 2018 season between Princeton and the Hudson Valley Renegades, going a combined 4–2 with a 4.50 ERA over 52 innings. He split the 2019 season between the Bowling Green Hot Rods, Charlotte Stone Crabs, and Durham Bulls, going 4–1 with a 2.26 ERA over 75 2/3 innings.

=== Philadelphia Phillies ===
Sánchez was traded to the Philadelphia Phillies in exchange for Curtis Mead on November 20, 2019. Sánchez was added to the Phillies’ 40-man roster after being acquired. He did not play in a game in 2020 due to the cancellation of the Minor League Baseball season because of the COVID-19 pandemic.

On April 19, 2021, Sánchez was promoted to the major leagues for the first time. However, he was optioned down to the minors the next day without pitching in the majors. On May 3, Sánchez was recalled to the active roster but was again optioned down the next day without playing. After long relievers Chase Anderson and David Hale were placed on the COVID-19 injured list, leaving the Phillies' bullpen lacking pitchers, Sánchez was recalled to the major leagues on June 6. He made his major league debut that afternoon, allowing one hit and striking out two batters in the final 1 1/3 innings of a 12–6 win against the Washington Nationals. He returned to the minors after that game, pitching six more times in the majors in 2021. Sánchez also split 2022 between Philadelphia and Triple-A.

In June 2023, Sánchez became a regular part of the Phillies' rotation after being called up from the Lehigh Valley Iron Pigs. In 19 games (18 starts), Sánchez compiled a 3–5 record and 3.44 ERA with 96 strikeouts across 99 1/3 innings pitched for Philadelphia. He made his postseason debut later in the season on October 20 against the Arizona Diamondbacks. He only lasted 2 1/3 innings in Game 4 of the National League Championship Series.

On June 22, 2024, Sánchez and the Phillies agreed to a four-year, $22.5 million contract extension. On June 28, he threw his first career complete game shutout, allowing only three hits in a 2–0 win over the Miami Marlins. Sánchez was named National League (NL) Pitcher of the Month for June, after posting 3 wins and 0 losses, with a 1.64 ERA and 23 strikeouts across 33 innings. He was named to the MLB All-Star Game. In 31 games (31 starts) during the 2024 season, Sánchez compiled a 11–9 record and 3.32 ERA with 153 strikeouts across 181 2/3 innings pitched.

Despite pitching well to start the 2025 season, Sánchez was controversially passed over for selection to the All-Star Game in favor of New York Mets pitcher David Peterson. Despite this, the Phillies still rewarded him his $50,000 All-Star bonus. On July 22, he pitched a complete game against the Boston Red Sox, recording the win after allowing only one run and striking out 12. In 32 games (32 starts) during the 2025 season, Sánchez compiled a 13–5 record and 2.50 ERA with 212 strikeouts across 202 innings pitched. Sánchez placed second in NL Cy Young Award voting behind Paul Skenes. In Game 1 of the NL Division Series, Sánchez struck out 8 in 5 2/3 innings, but Philadelphia lost to the Los Angeles Dodgers.

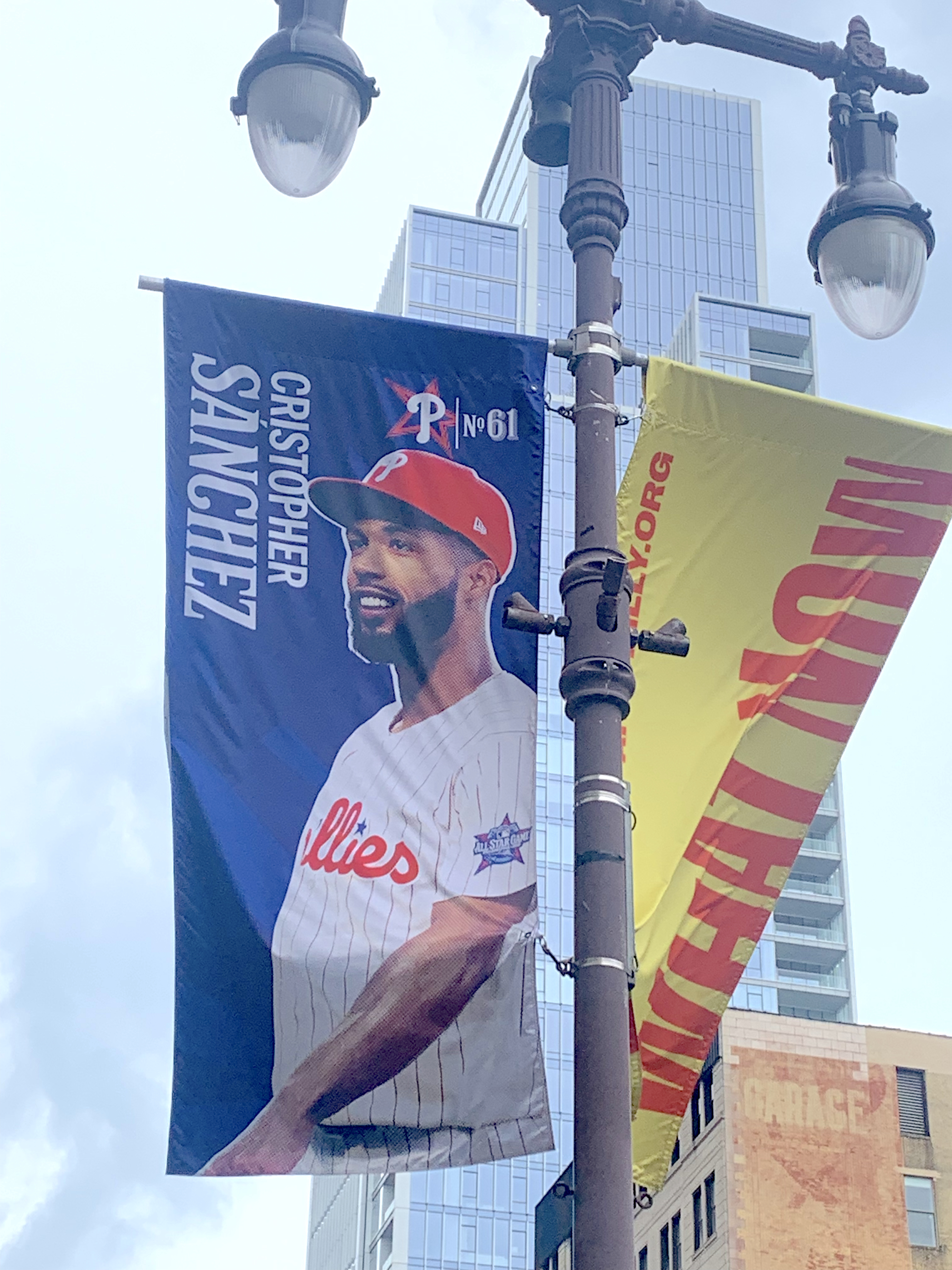
Cristopher Sánchez, 2026 MLB All-Star Game banner (July 2026)

On March 22, 2026, Sánchez and the Phillies agreed to a six-year, $107 million contract extension. On May 16, Sánchez recorded a career-high 13 strikeouts in a 6–0 victory over the Pittsburgh Pirates. It was the second complete-game shutout of his career. He gave up five hits and no walks on 108 pitches, extending his scoreless streak to 29 2/3 innings. On May 27, 2026, against the San Diego Padres, Sánchez surpassed Hall of Famer Grover Cleveland Alexander for the longest scoreless-innings streak by any Phillies pitcher since 1893 (when the mound moved to its current distance). Sánchez's seven scoreless innings raised his total to 44 2/3 innings, eclipsing Alexander's 41-inning streak as a rookie in 1911. In his next start on June 3 (again facing the Padres), after pitching a scoreless first inning, he set the MLB record for the longest scoreless-innings streak by a left-handed pitcher. However, he allowed a run in the seventh inning of that game, bringing his streak to an end at 50 2/3 innings, fifth-longest in MLB history.

On July 12, 2026, Sánchez was announced as the starting pitcher for the National League in the 2026 All-Star Game. His stats in 2026 included 33 starts with a 18–7 record, a 2.91 ERA, and 231 strikeouts in 207 innings pitched. He allowed 204 hits, which led MLB, also tying with Sandy Alcántara, and posted a strikeout-to-walk ratio of 5.13.

On November 2, 2026, Sánchez was named a finalist for the National League Cy Young Award alongside Jacob Misiorowski and Chris Sale.

== International career ==
Sánchez pitched for the Dominican Republic national baseball team in the 2019 WBSC Premier12. He allowed four runs, including a home run to future teammate Alec Bohm, in a loss to the United States. Sánchez returned to the Dominican Republic team for the 2026 World Baseball Classic. He had a four-strikeout inning against Nicaragua, with the leadoff batter reaching on a wild pitch. He allowed 3 runs in 1 1/3 innings. He then earned a win in the quarterfinals against South Korea, striking out 8 in five innings in a 10–0 win.

Awards
Preceded by Shohei Ohtani	National League Pitcher of the Month; May 2026	Succeeded by Logan Webb
