= Jonathan Bowlan =

American baseball player (born 1996)

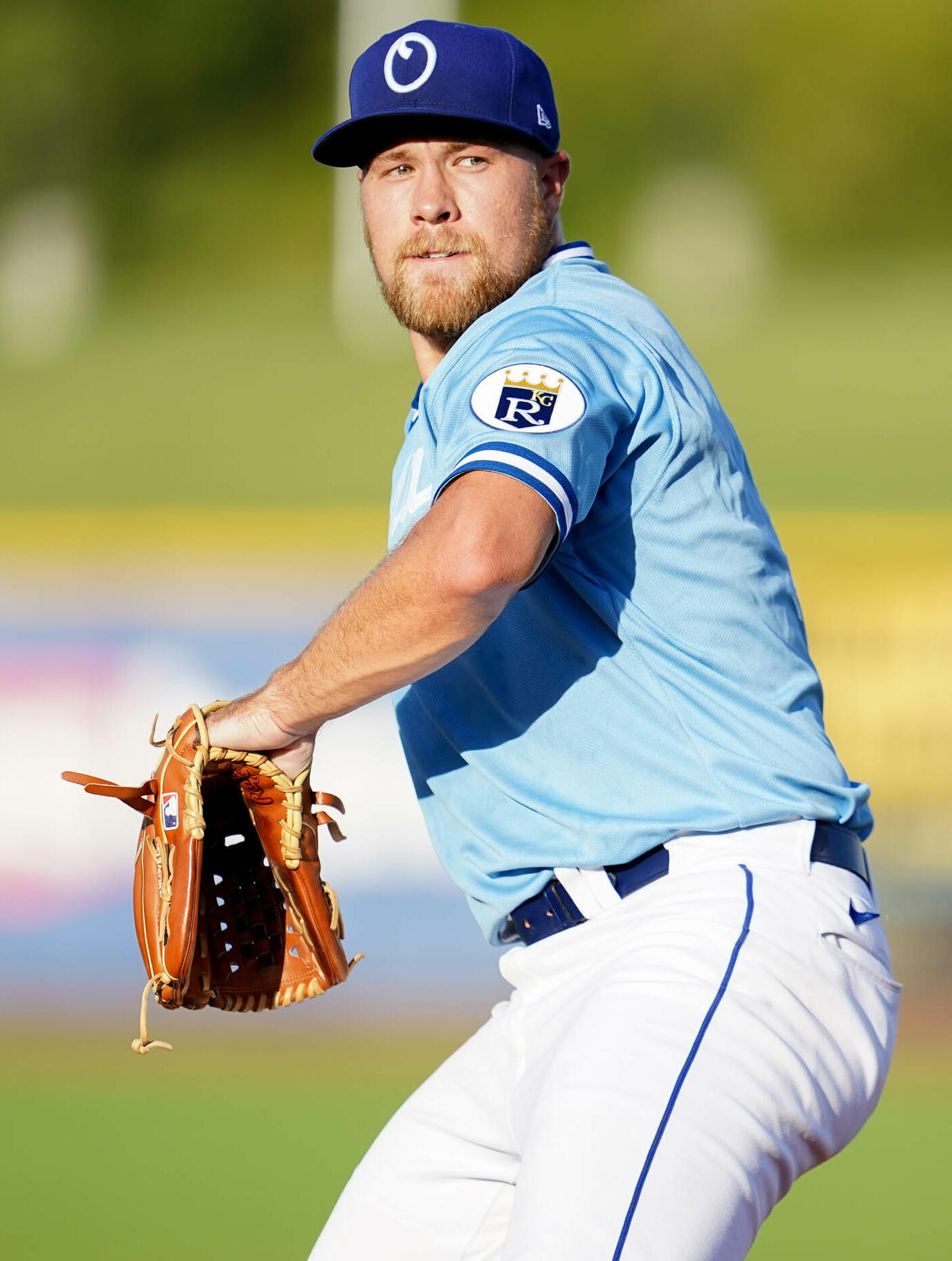
- Bowlan with the Omaha Storm Chasers in 2023

Philadelphia Phillies – No. 52
- Pitcher
- Born: December 1, 1996 (age 29); Arlington, Tennessee, U.S.
- Bats: Right Throws: Right

MLB debut
- September 27, 2023, for the Kansas City Royals

MLB statistics (through 2026 season)
- Win–loss record: 3–6
- Earned run average: 3.81
- Strikeouts: 125
- Stats at Baseball Reference

Teams
- Kansas City Royals (2023–2025); Philadelphia Phillies (2026–present)

Jonathan Bowlan (born December 1, 1996) is an American professional baseball pitcher for the Philadelphia Phillies of Major League Baseball (MLB). He has previously played in MLB for the Kansas City Royals.

== Early life ==
Bowlan attended Bartlett High School in Bartlett, Tennessee. He enrolled at the University of Memphis and played college baseball for the Memphis Tigers. In 2018, Bowlan set a Tigers and American Athletic Conference record with 18 strikeouts in one game.

Bowlan's father Mark also played baseball and was a 19th round draft pick by the St. Louis Cardinals in 1989.

== Professional career ==
=== Draft and minor leagues (2018–2023) ===
The Kansas City Royals selected Bowlan in the second round of the 2018 Major League Baseball draft. Bowlan made his professional debut with the rookie–level Idaho Falls Chukars, going 1–4 with a 6.94 ERA over 35 innings.

Bowlan started 2019 with the Single–A Lexington Legends and was promoted to the High–A Wilmington Blue Rocks during the season. Pitching for Wilmington in July, he threw a no-hitter against the Carolina Mudcats. Over 26 games (23 starts) between the two teams, Bowlan went 11–5 with a 3.14 ERA and 150 strikeouts over 146 innings. He did not play a game in 2020 due to the cancellation of the minor league season because of the COVID-19 pandemic. In 2021, Bowlan appeared in only four games in prior to undergoing Tommy John surgery in May.

On November 19, 2021, the Royals added Bowlan to their 40-man roster to protect him from the Rule 5 draft. He split the 2022 season between the Double–A Northwest Arkansas Naturals, High–A Quad Cities River Bandits, and rookie–level Arizona Complex League Royals. In 17 total starts, he posted a combined 1–4 record and 5.92 ERA with 62 strikeouts in 62 1/3 innings pitched.

Bowlan was optioned to Double-A Northwest Arkansas to begin the 2023 season. In 24 games (21 starts) split between Northwest Arkansas and the Triple–A Omaha Storm Chasers, he registered a cumulative 7–11 record and 5.91 ERA with 105 strikeouts in 102 innings of work.

=== Kansas City Royals (2023–2025) ===
On September 19, 2023, Bowlan was promoted to the major leagues for the first time. He appeared in two games for the Royals, pitching three innings and registering a 3.00 ERA.

Bowlan was optioned to Triple–A Omaha to begin the 2024 season. He made one start for Kansas City on the year, allowing 4 runs on 6 hits with 3 strikeouts in 2 2/3 innings pitched against the Toronto Blue Jays.

Bowlan was again optioned to Triple-A Omaha to begin the 2025 season. On May 21, 2025, Bowlan recorded his first career win against the San Francisco Giants. He made 34 appearances (one start) for Kansas City, compiling a 1-2 record and 3.86 ERA with 46 strikeouts across 44 1/3 innings pitched.

=== Philadelphia Phillies (2026–present) ===
On December 19, 2025, Bowlan was traded to the Philadelphia Phillies in exchange for Matt Strahm.
